= S. M. Ruhul Amin =

- Born: Gopalganj District, East Pakistan, Pakistan
- Occupation: Police officer
- Years active: 1991–2024
- Employer: Bangladesh Police
- Title: Chief, Anti-Terrorism Unit

S. M. Ruhul Amin is an Additional Inspector General of Police in the Bangladesh Police and the former Chief of the Anti-Terrorism Unit of Bangladesh Police. He is a director of Community Bank Bangladesh. He was the Commissioner of the Barisal Metropolitan Police.

== Early life and education ==
Amin was born in Gopalganj District, East Pakistan, Pakistan. He completed his bachelor's and master's degrees in International Relations at the University of Dhaka.

== Career ==
Amin joined the 12th batch of the Bangladesh Civil Service as an Assistant Superintendent of Police in 1991. Early in his career, he served as Assistant Superintendent of Police and Additional Superintendent of Police in several districts. He had served in the Dhaka Metropolitan Police, Armed Police Battalion, Police Staff College, Bangladesh and Police Headquarters. In 2006, he was the Deputy Commissioner (north) of the Chittagong Metropolitan Police.

Amin served as the Superintendent of Police of Rajbari, Jhalokati, and Sylhet Districts. He was the Deputy Commissioner in Chattogram Metropolitan Police. He later served as the Additional Deputy Inspector General of Chattogram Range and Police Headquarters. At Police Headquarters, he served as Deputy Inspector General of Media and Planning and Deputy Inspector General of Human Resource. In 2015, he was appointed the Deputy Inspector General of Dhaka Range of Railway Police replacing Mollik Fakrul Islam. He was the Police Commissioner of Barisal Metropolitan Police. He inaugurated the Aroj Ali Matubbar Memorial Museum.

Amin served in the Civilian Police Peacekeeping Operations in Angola under MONUA, as Rotation Officer and Deputy Chief of Rotation in United Nations Interim Administration Mission in Kosovo, and as Team Leader and Chief of the FPU Liaison Office in the United Nations Mission in South Sudan. He was the Contingent Commander of the Bangladesh police contingent in United Nations Operation in Côte d'Ivoire. In recognition of his service, he was awarded the UN Peacekeeping Medal twice. In 2018, Amin was the deputy inspector general in charge of the media wing at the Bangladesh Police Headquarters. He made nocomments after The Daily Star sought his statement over Bangladesh Police removing the interpol notice for Haris Ahmed, gangster and younger brother of the Bangladesh Army chief General Aziz Ahmed.

In 2019, as Deputy Inspector General, Amin led an investigation into allegations of police negligence in the Murder of Nusrat Jahan Rafi. He found that four police officers were negligent. He was part of an initiative of the Bangladesh Police to organise a feast for officers involved in the 2018 general election. He served as Additional Inspector General, overseeing Logistics and Asset Acquisition at police headquarters. He served as the Additional Inspector General of Human Resource Management at the Bangladesh Police Headquarters. In September 2022, Amin was appointed Chief of the Anti-Terrorism Unit of Bangladesh Police. He was considered for the top post of Inspector General of Police replacing Chowdhury Abdullah Al Mamun. He sought to grant the Anti-Terrorism Unit more powers to investigate terrorist finances. He detained a convict in the Humayun Azad murder case and a member of the Jamaat-ul-Mujahideen Bangladesh. He was a director of Community Bank Bangladesh.

== Personal life ==
Amin is married and has two children.
