= Md. Atiqul Islam (police officer) =

Md. Atiqul Islam is an additional inspector general of crime and operation of the Bangladesh Police. He is a former chief of the Bangladesh Highway Police.

== Early life ==
Islam was born on 10 June 1966 in Rangpur District, East Pakistan, Pakistan. He did his undergrad in pharmacology at the Bangabandhu Sheikh Mujib Medical University. He completed his master's in philosophy at Jahangirnagar University.

== Career ==
Islam joined the Bangladesh Civil Service police cadre in 1991. Islam was the assistant superintendent of police of Armed Police Battalion-6 in Barisal and Armed Police Battalion-8.

In September 2014, Islam was appointed deputy inspector general of Bangladesh Police headquarters.

Deputy Inspector General Md. Atiqul Islam was transferred from police headquarters to Highway Police replacing Mallick Faqrul Islam who was transferred to Special Branch in October 2016. Islam was the chief of the Highway Police from 6 November 2016 to 2 July 2019. He was replaced by Barrister Mahbubur Rahman. He was the president of President of Bangladesh Police Handball Club.

In May 2021, Islam was promoted to additional inspector general from deputy inspector general. He was serving as the chief of River Police/Naval Police. He is a director of Community Bank Bangladesh Limited. He called for increased invigilation over police case investigations. In December 2023, he ordered the police to increase raids to find stolen cellphones.

Following the fall of the Sheikh Hasina led Awami League government, Islam was sent into forced retirement along with additional IGP Anwar Hossain and additional commissioner Md. Asaduzzaman.

== Personal life ==
Islam is married to Zakia Sultana, senior secretary of the Ministry of Industries.
