= Delwar Hossain Mia =

Chief of the Bangladeshi Highway Police

Md. Delwar Hossain Mia
- মোঃ দেলোয়ার হোসেন মিঞা

Additional Inspector General of Highway Police
- In office October 17, 2024 – June 2026
- President: Mohammed Shahabuddin
- Prime Minister: Muhammad Yunus (acting)
- Preceded by: Shahabuddin Khan

Personal details
- Born: Bangladesh
- Education: Military Training Bangladesh Military Academy Police Training Bangladesh Police Academy
- Police career
- Allegiance: Bangladesh
- Branch: Bangladesh Police
- Service years: 1991-2026
- Status: Retired
- Rank: Additional IGP

Delwar Hossain Mia is a Bangladeshi police officer who was chief of the Highway Police. The Awami League government sent him into forced retirement; he was reinstated after the Muhammad Yunus–led interim government took power.

== Birth and education ==
He was born in Tangail District. He completed an MBA degree.

== Career ==
Mia joined the 12th batch of the Bangladesh Civil Service as a police cadre. He started his career as an assistant superintendent of police on 20 January 1991. He was trained at the Bangladesh Military Academy.

During his career, he received professional training at home and abroad, including basic police training at the Bangladesh Police Academy in Sardah, Rajshahi, and the Foundation Training Course at the Bangladesh Public Administration Training Centre in Savar, Dhaka. He also participated in Crisis Response Team Training at the Louisiana State Police Academy in the United States and a Senior Leadership Management Course with the Australian Federal Police in Sydney, Australia.

He was promoted to the rank of deputy inspector general of police on 3 September 2024. He was later promoted to the rank of additional inspector general of police on 2 October 2024.

During his service, he worked in different positions and units of the Bangladesh Police. As an assistant superintendent of police, he served in Armed Police Battalion-2 in Rangamati and the Special Security Force. As an additional superintendent of police, he served in Dhaka Metropolitan Police and in Naogaon, Gopalganj, and Khulna districts. He later served as superintendent of police in several units, including Dinajpur District, Police Headquarters, Special Branch, Dhaka Metropolitan Police, Armed Police Battalion, and the Criminal Investigation Department (CID).

He assumed the post of additional inspector general of police of the Highway Police on 17 October 2024 and has been serving as the chief of the unit since then. His career included a period of interruption, including retirement in October 2022, before later returning to senior leadership roles.

In addition to his police career, he has been involved in sports administration. He is the president of the Bangladesh Police Badminton Club and has an interest in sports such as tennis, football, and volleyball.

Mia was the superintendent of Dinajpur District. In August 2006, seven people were killed and 300 injured after police under his command and Bangladesh Rifles personnel opened fire on protestors, part of the nonviolent movement opposing open pit mining in Bangladesh, marching to Asia Energy Corporation (Bangladesh) Pvt Limited to protest the activities at Phulbari coal mine. Mia said, "The police were forced to open fire after being attacked by the demonstrators equipped with lethal weapons."

In October 2022, Mia was forced into retirement by the Awami League government, along with Mirza Abdullahel Baqui and Shahidullah Chowdhury. Mia had been deprived of promotions during the Awami League government, citing public interest. The officers were let go because of their alleged ties with the Bangladesh Nationalist Party and the Bangladesh Jamaat-e-Islami. Days before them, Md Mokbul Hossain, Ministry of Information and Broadcasting secretary, was forced into retirement.

After the fall of the Sheikh Hasina-led Awami League government, Mia was brought out of retirement and appointed chief of the highway police. At the same time, Abdullah Al Mahmud, Sarder Tamiz Uddin Ahmed, and Kusum Dewan were appointed heads of the Armed Police Battalion, the Railway Police, and the River Police, respectively. He was promoted to additional inspectors general of police rank.

== Personal life ==
He is married to Sadia Afroze. The couple has two children, a daughter and a son.
