= Mohammed Nazibur Rahman =

Mohammed Nazibur Rahman is an additional inspector general of the Bangladesh Police and former rector of Police Staff College, Bangladesh. He is the former principal of Bangladesh Police Academy. He is a former commissioner of Khulna Metropolitan Police and director of the National Security Intelligence. He had previously served in the Bangladesh High Commission to India and was the first chief of the Bangladesh Police's Anti-Terrorism Unit.

== Early life ==
Rahman was born in Gopalganj District.

== Career ==
Rahman came second in his batch of police officers.

Rahman Superintendent of Police of Sirajganj District in 2001. He was later posted to the Bangladesh Police Academy and then made superintendent of police of Bandarban District.

Rahman was suspended during the Bangladesh Nationalist Party government rule for refusing to disperse a peaceful rally of then opposition Awami League when he was a deputy commissioner of Dhaka Metropolitan Police. The Bangladesh Nationalist Party had halted promotions and posting in important positions for police officers from Gopalganj District, Faridpur District, and Hindu officers who were perceived to being loyal to the opposition Awami League. He was posted to the Police Special Training School in Rangamati District. He was promoted and posted to the Police Training Centre, Tangail. He was transferred to the Special Branch Training School and then returned to Bangladesh Police Academy.

In January 2007 Rahman was appointed deputy inspector general of the Highway Police from Bangladesh Police Academy. In December 2007, Rahman was transferred from the post of commissioner of Khulna Metropolitan Police to National Security Intelligence as its director.

Rahman had served in the Bangladesh High Commission to India based in New Delhi. He met sculptor Rashid Ahmed in Indian jail, the first time anyone from the embassy met him since his detention in 2004, and helped expedite his trial process in July 2012. Rashid Ahmed, and his wife, had been jailed on allegations of bring fake Indian currency from Bangladesh in 2004. The embassy requested the foreign ministry of India to expedite the trial. Ahmed was sentenced to eight years, time he had served and fined 150 thousand Indian rupees. Three Indians, Ashish Wig, Chetan Seth, and Yogesh Kochhar, paid the fine, which Ahmed could not afford, and paid for his fare home.

Rahman, then deputy inspector general, was transferred to Counter Terrorism Unit of Bangladesh Police in April 2013. He was appointed chief of the newly created Anti Terrorism Unit.

In September 2015, Rahman was appointed to the Criminal Investigation Department. Rahman was promoted to additional inspector general from deputy inspector general in December 2015.

In 2018, Rahman, then principal of Bangladesh Police Academy, received Prime Minister Sheikh Hasina when she came to address the graduation ceremony of the 35th Bangladesh Civil Service batch of police officers. He oversaw the signing of an agreement with the Sardar Vallabhbhai Patel National Police Academy. He attended a program at the police academy addressed by High Court Division Justice Syed Refaat Ahmed. He was promoted to supernumerary grade one officer along with Asaduzzaman Mia, Benajir Ahmed, and Sheikh Hemayet Hossain Mia.

From 1 December 2020 to 9 October 2021, Rahman was the rector of the Police Staff College.
