= Md. Kamrul Ahsan =

Bangladeshi police officer (born 1966)

Md Kamrul Ahsan BPM (Bar)
- Born: January 20, 1966 (age 60); Chandpur, East Pakistan
- Occupation: Police officer
- Years active: 1991–2025
- Employer: Bangladesh Police
- Title: Additional Inspector General (Administration)

Md Kamrul Ahsan (born 20 January 1966) is a Bangladeshi police officer and former additional inspector general (administration) at the Bangladesh Police Headquarters. He is a former chief of the Anti-Terrorism Unit. He is a director of Community Bank Bangladesh Ltd. He is a former commissioner of the Sylhet Metropolitan Police.

== Early life and education ==
Md Kamrul Ahsan was born on 20 January 1966 in Chandpur District, East Pakistan, Pakistan. He completed his bachelor's degree in agriculture from the Bangladesh Agricultural University and later earned an MBA from Southeast University.

== Career ==
Ahsan joined the Bangladesh Police through the 12th Bangladesh Civil Service examination in 1991 as an assistant superintendent of police. Throughout his career, he served in several important positions, including superintendent of police in Shariatpur, Chattogram, and Jashore. He was the deputy inspector general of Railway Range, Dhaka. In September 2014, he was appointed commissioner of Sylhet Metropolitan Police. He was the Range Deputy Inspector General of Sylhet. Ahsan is known for introducing and institutionalising the concept of "Beat Policing at Union level" across the Sylhet Division.

Internationally, Ahsan served in United Nations peacekeeping operations. He was UNPOL deputy team leader in Kenema Province under the United Nations Mission in Sierra Leone and later led the Bangladesh Police contingent in the United Nations Mission in Sudan, serving as Civpol advisor. He received two UN peacekeeping medals in recognition of his contributions. In August 2019, he was promoted to additional deputy inspector general while serving as an assistant inspector general of police in the Bangladesh Police Headquarters. In 2020, he was the additional deputy inspector general of the CID Cyber Police.

Ahsan commanded the Anti-Terrorism Unit as its chief for more than two years. He planned and oversaw the publication of Extremism and Terrorism in the Eye of Islam, a counter-narrative book published by ATU in July 2022. He was appointed the additional inspector general (administration) on 4 September 2022. He has also published scholarly works, including Green Marketing in Bangladesh and Critical Analysis of the Causes and Effects of Women and Child Trafficking: Bangladesh Perspective in the Journal of Police Staff College, Bangladesh. In 2023, he was considered a possible successor to Inspector General of Police Chowdhury Abdullah Al Mamun. He was the additional inspector general (crime and operations) at Police Headquarters. He is a director of Community Bank Bangladesh. After the fall of the Sheikh Hasina-led Awami League government, he was sent to the Police Department in August 2024. He was then appointed additional deputy inspector general (confidential) at the police headquarters.

== Personal life ==
Ahsan is married to advocate Munmun Ahsan. They have three sons.
