= Police Training Centre =

Bangladesh Police Training Centres (PTC) in Bangladesh were initially established in 1972 as Zonal Police Training Schools (ZPTS) to impart training mainly to Trainee Recruit Constables (TRC) of Bangladesh Police. With the course of time for meeting up the need of recruiting and training huge constables and different level officers as well as staffs, those schools were not found sufficiently equipped. So it became the demand of the time to upgrade those training institutes. On this backdrop, the facilities and capacities of those schools were further developed in 1992. They were upgraded as Police Training Centers. Those training centers are training a lot more like- Armed Police Battalion, Staffs, the Security Personnel of Forest Division, Boatmen, Gardeners, Laskars, Head Constables etc. in addition to impart training to only fresh recruit constables.

However, from the inception up to 1992 Police Training Schools were commanded by the respective Superintendent of Police of the district where they were located. Now a Commandant (Additional DIG of Police) commands each of them as the Commandant. There are four Police Training Centers at this time and those are as follows:

- Police Training Centre, Tangail
- Police Training Centre, Rangpur
- Police Training Centre, Khulna
- Police Training Centre, Noakhali
- Police Special Training School
- Detective Training School
- Special Branch Training School
- Traffic and Driving School
