= Rowshan Ara Begum =

Raushan Ara Begum

Bangladesh Police
- Incumbent
- Assumed office 15 February 1988
- Preceded by: Fatema Begum

Personal details
- Born: Raushan Ara Begum; 1 January 1962 Raishree, Shahrasti Upazila, Chandpur District, Bangladesh
- Died: May 5, 2019 (aged 57) Kinshasa, Democratic Republic of the Congo
- Spouse: Md. Shafiqul Alam Chowdhury
- Children: Ara Munaha Chowdhury (daughter)
- Parent(s): Ismail Hossain (father); Amena Begum (mother)
- Education: BSS (Honors) in Sociology; MSS in Sociology
- Alma mater: T&T Mohila (University) College; Viqarunnisa Noon School and College; University of Dhaka
- Occupation: Additional Inspector General, Bangladesh Police
- Known for: First female Superintendent of Police (SP) of Munshiganj, Bangladesh
- Awards: President Police Medal (PPM)
- Second highest-ranking female police officer in Bangladesh

Raushan Ara Begum (1 January 1962 – 5 May 2019) was an Additional Inspector General of Bangladesh Police, the first woman to hold the second highest position of Bangladesh Police. She was awarded the President Police Medal (PPM) and was the first woman Superintendent of Police (SP) of Munshiganj District.

== Early life ==
Begum was born on 1 January 1962, in Shahrasti Upazila, Chandpur District, Bangladesh. Although born in Chandpur, she lived in Dhaka. Her father was Ismail Hossain, and her mother was Amena Begum. She was married to Md. Shafiqul Alam Chowdhury, a businessman. Her father-in-law, Nurullah Chowdhury, was a former chief microbiologist at Mohakhali Cholera Hospital. She completed her master's at the University of Dhaka.

== Career ==
Begum joined the 7th BCS Bangladesh Civil Service as a police cadre on 15 February 1988. She received her basic training at the Bangladesh Police Academy in Sarda, Rajshahi, and started her career as a probationary Assistant Superintendent of Police in Dhaka. She worked in various capacities in the Dhaka Metropolitan Police, Narayanganj District, and Rajshahi.

Begum was promoted to Additional Superintendent of Police and served in Cox's Bazar District, Tangail District, Comilla District, and Chattogram District from 1994 to 1998. On 3 December 1998, she became the first female Superintendent of Police (SP) in Bangladesh and served as the SP of Munshiganj District. On her appointment, Prime Minister Sheikh Hasina stated, "There was resistance when I wanted to appoint Rowshan Ara as the first female SP. She dispelled all doubts as soon as she joined duty there. She arrested a dacoit in-person and it was her who put the criminal at gunpoint before making the arrest.". She was awarded the Anannya Top Ten Awards in 1999.

Begum participated in several United Nations peacekeeping missions. She served as a Crime Analysis Officer in the United Nations Interim Administration Mission in Kosovo (UNMIK) from July 16, 2002, to July 15, 2003. She served as commander of Armed Police Battalion-8 and Armed Police Battalion-9. She later as Chief of the UN Police Force in the United Nations Mission in Sudan from 30 April 2008 to 29 November 2009. She was transferred to Railway Police as an additional deputy inspector general in 2013.

Later, Begum worked in various roles at the National Board of Revenue, the Special Branch, and the Criminal Investigation Department. In 2018, she was promoted to Additional Inspector General of Police following the recommendation of the Superior Selection Board, and was serving as rector of the Police Staff College until her death. She was the president of the Bangladesh Police Women's Network.

== Death ==
On 3 May 2019, Begum traveled to the Democratic Republic of the Congo to inspect a UN peacekeeping mission. On 5 May 2019, she was involved in a fatal road accident in Kinshasa when a truck collided with her vehicle, killing her on the spot. Her death was a shock as she was expected to be appointed the first female chief of Bangladesh Police. Prime Minister Sheikh Hasina expressed shock over her death.
