= Women in the Bangladesh Police =

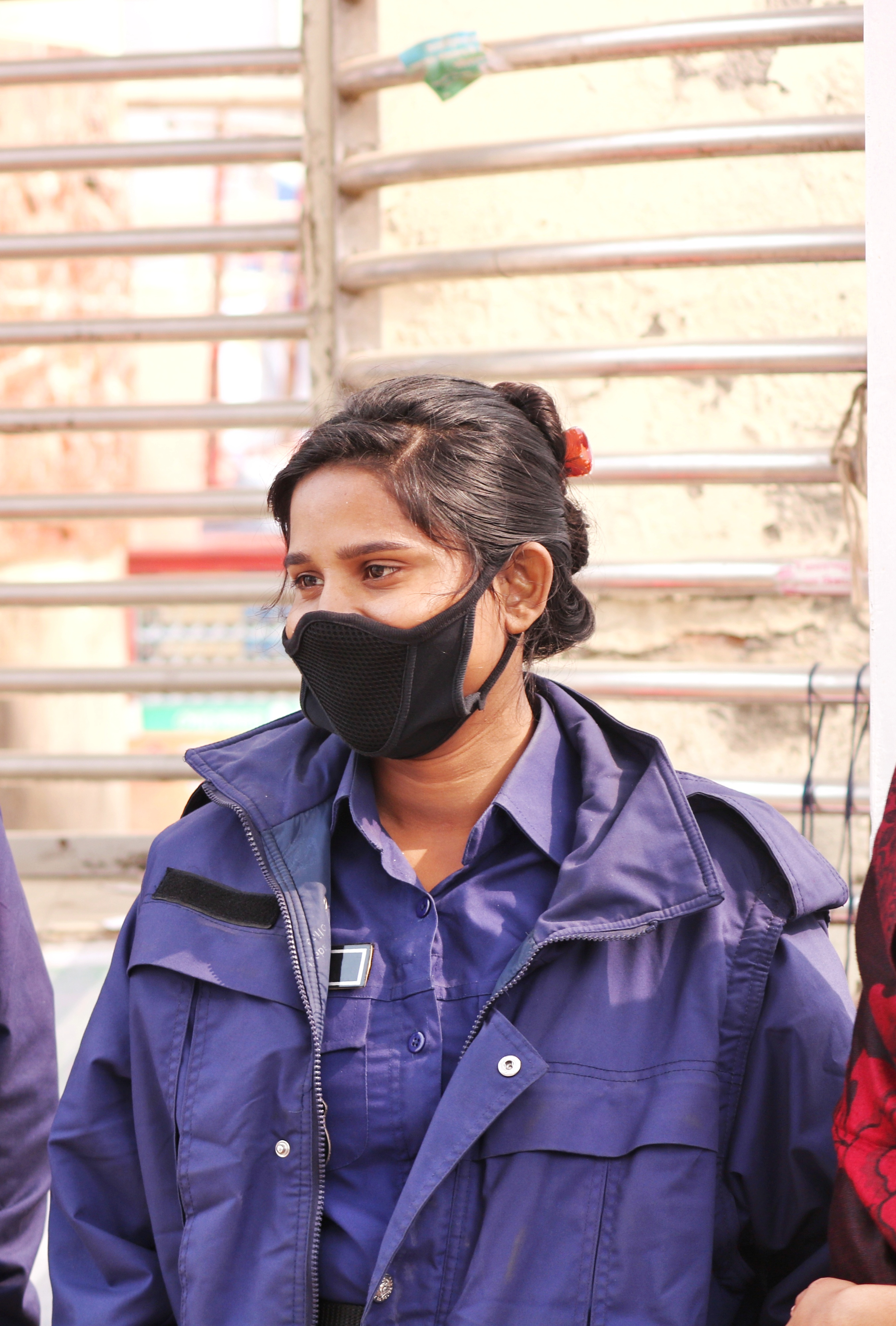
A female police in official duty at Unnayan Mela 2018

Women joined the Bangladesh Police for the first time in 1974, when 14 women were appointed in the Special Branch: seven were at the rank of Sub-Inspector, and seven were at the rank of Constable. The first female uniformed police members were recruited two years later, in 1976, when 15 women were appointed in the Dhaka Metropolitan Police. They were also at the ranks of Constable and Sub-Inspector.

In 1986, there was only one serving woman police officer: Fatema Begum was appointed as Assistant Superintendent of Police through 5th Bangladesh Civil Service (BCS) examination. After two years, in 1988, four women joined Bangladesh Police through the 7th Bangladesh Civil Service examination. After an interval from 1989 to 1998, in 1999, eight women officers were appointed through the 18th Bangladesh Civil Service examination. On 21 June 2011 an all-women Armed Police Battalion (APBn-11) was created as the 11th battalion of this force. Women were appointed as traffic sergeants in cities for the first time in 2015.

As of 2010, there were 2,240 women in the Bangladesh Police, from the rank of constable to additional police superintendent. As of January 2021, there were 15,163 policewomen in the Bangladesh Police, which was 7.92% of the total personnel.

Bangladesh Police Women's Network ('BPWN') was created in 2008.

There is an award for the female police members of the Bangladesh Police which is known as 'Police Women Award'.
