= Syed Shahzaman Raj =

Bangladeshi police officer

Chief of Criminal Investigation Department
- In office 16 March 2009 – 14 October 2010
- Preceded by: Mohammad Javed Patwary
- Succeeded by: Md. Mokhlesur Rahman

Chief of Highway Police
- In office 11 June 2005 – 20 October 2005
- Succeeded by: Sheikh Mohammad Sazzad Ali

Commissioner of Sylhet Metropolitan Police
- Police career
- Allegiance: Bangladesh
- Branch: Bangladesh Police
- Status: Retired
- Rank: Additional Inspector General

Syed Shahzaman Raj is a retired additional inspector general of Bangladesh Police and former chief of the Criminal Investigation Department. He was the first chief of the Highway Police.

== Career ==
In 2001, Raj was the superintendent of police of Rangpur District.

Raj was the additional deputy inspector general of police of the Dhaka Range in 2005. He was appointed the first chief of the newly created Highway Police.

In June 2008, Raj was appointed the acting additional inspector general of the Bangladesh Police Headquarters. He was the vice-president of the Bangladesh Police Service Association.

Raj was appointed chief of the Criminal Investigation Department on 16 March 2009, replacing Mohammad Javed Patwary. He was serving at the Bangladesh Police headquarters. He oversaw the Criminal Investigation Department's investigation in the 2009 Criminal Investigation Department's investigation into the 2009 Bangladesh Rifles mutiny. In January, he was promoted to additional inspector general of Bangladesh Police along with Mohammad Javed Patwary and A. K. M. Shahidul Haque. He served till 14 October 2010 and was replaced by Md. Mokhlesur Rahman.

Raj is a permanent member of the Capital Recreation Club.
