= Mohammad Javed Patwary =

Bangladeshi police officer

- মোহাম্মদ জাবেদ পাটোয়ারী
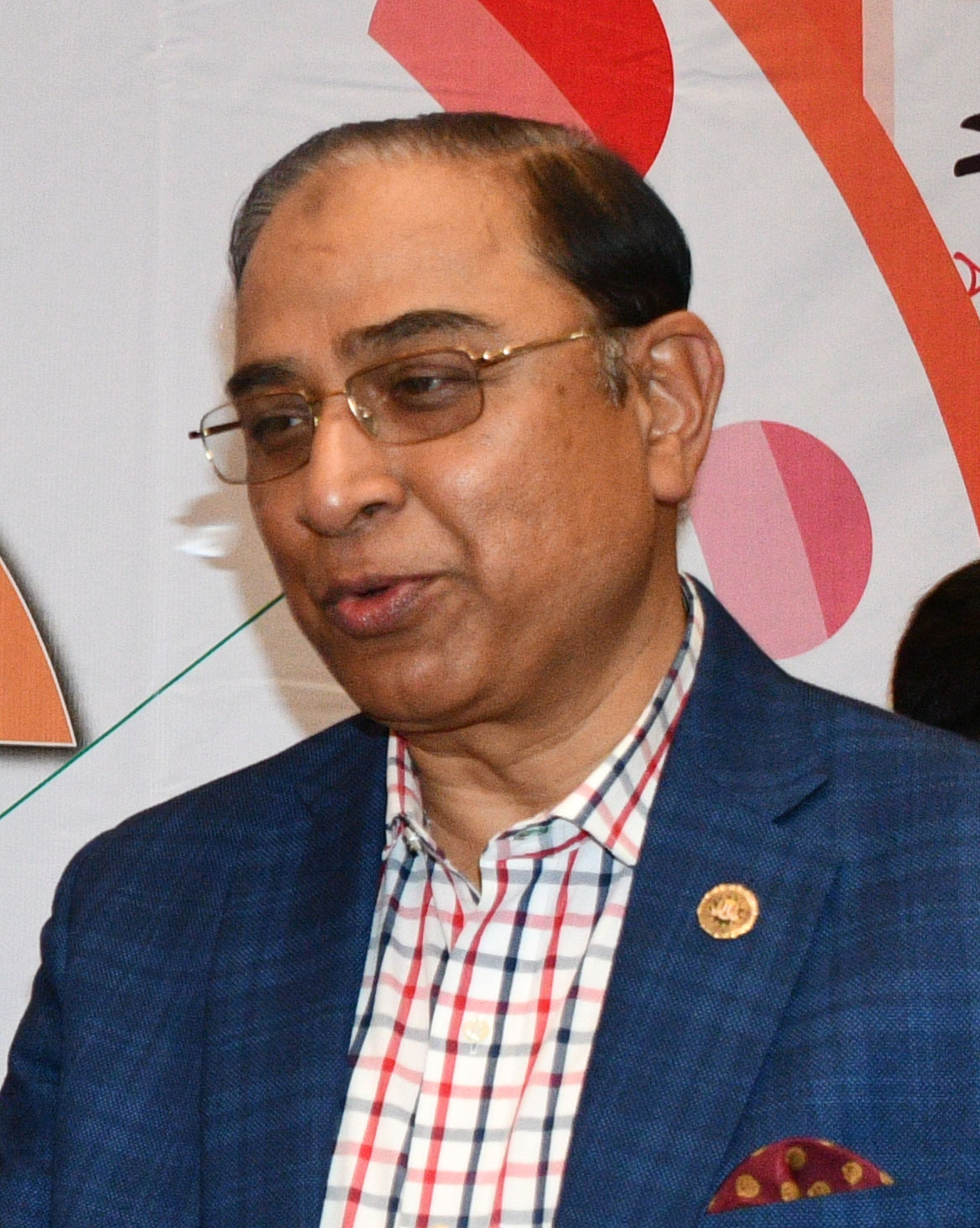

Ambassador of Bangladesh to Saudi Arabia
- In office 22 August 2020 – 15 August 2024
- President: Abdul Hamid; Mohammed Shahabuddin
- Prime Minister: Sheikh Hasina; Muhammad Yunus (acting)
- Preceded by: Golam Moshi
- Succeeded by: Md. Delwar Hossain

Inspector General of Bangladesh Police
- In office 31 January 2018 – 15 April 2020
- President: Abdul Hamid
- Prime Minister: Sheikh Hasina
- Preceded by: A. K. M. Shahidul Haque
- Succeeded by: Benazir Ahmed

8th Chief Executive of Criminal Investigation Department
- In office 19 February 2008 – 16 March 2009
- Appointed by: Minister of Home Affairs
- Preceded by: Phani Bhoushon Choudhury
- Succeeded by: Syed Shahzaman Raj

Personal details
- Born: 15 April 1961 (age 65) Chandpur District, East Pakistan
- Education: University of Dhaka; Jahangirnagar University
- Awards: Bangladesh Police Medal (BPM; 2010, 2011)
- Police career
- Allegiance: Bangladesh
- Branch: Bangladesh Police
- Service years: 1986–2020
- Status: Retired
- Rank: IGP

Mohammad Javed Patwary (born 1961) is a retired Bangladeshi police officer and diplomat. From January 2018 to April 2020, he was inspector general of police (IGP), the highest position in the Bangladesh Police. Earlier, he served as additional inspector general of the Special Branch (SB). After his retirement in 2020, he was appointed ambassador to Saudi Arabia by the government of Bangladesh.

== Early life and education ==
Patwary was born on 15 April 1961 and grew up in Mandari Village, Sadar upazila, Chandpur district. He earned his bachelor's and master's in social welfare from the University of Dhaka. He earned his PhD in public administration at Jahangirnagar University. His research topic was "Combating Terrorism in Bangladesh: Challenges and Prospects".

== Career ==
Patwary was awarded the first merit position in the police cadre of the 6th Bangladesh Civil Service (BCS) exams. He joined Bangladesh Police as an assistant superintendent of police in 1986.

During his career, he served in various units. He was assistant superintendent of police in Netrakona District, additional superintendent of police in Sylhet District, and additional deputy commissioner of Dhaka Metropolitan Police. He also held posts in various training institutions. From 1996 to 1999, he was special superintendent of police in the Criminal Investigation Department (CID). He later returned to CID as deputy inspector general and additional inspector general.

Patwary served in four United Nations peacekeeping missions: UNCRO in Croatia, UNMIK in Kosovo, UNAMSIL in Sierra Leone, and UNMISS in South Sudan.

In December 2004, he was promoted to deputy inspector general. He was briefly commissioner of the Rajshahi Metropolitan Police. From January 2005 to March 2005, he was commissioner of the Khulna Metropolitan Police. Patwary was awarded the Bangladesh Police Medal in 2010 and 2011. He also received the IGP's Exemplary Good Service Badge twice.

As additional inspector general, he headed Special Branch for nine years, until January 2018. During his time there, he collected documents for The Prison Diaries of Sheikh Mujibur Rahman, which pleased Rahman's family members, including Prime Minister Sheikh Hasina. He preserved documents of Sheikh Mujibur Rahman in the archives of the Special Branch.

Patwary was made inspector general of police effective 31 January 2018.

Patwary was a guest lecturer at the Social Welfare and Research Institute and the Department of Criminology at the University of Dhaka. He described the 2018 Bangladesh general election as "peaceful". He was the president of the Bangladesh Kabaddi Federation.

Patwary retired from the police with effect from 15 April 2020. He was replaced by Benazir Ahmed, director general of the Rapid Action Battalion. On 29 June 2020, he was appointed the ambassador of Bangladesh to Saudi Arabia on a three-year contract. He replaced Golam Moshi, a leader of the Jatiya Party, as ambassador.

== Criticism ==
In August 2025, some documents were found in the Special Branch, where it is mentioned that Patwary was the actual writer of the book The Unfinished Memoirs on behalf of Sheikh Hasina.
