= Police Training Centre, Noakhali =

- পুলিশ ট্রেনিং সেন্টার, নোয়াখালী
- Part of Bangladesh Police
- Noakhali District, Bangladesh

Site information
- Type: Police training centre
- Owner: Government of Bangladesh
- Controlled by: Bangladesh Police
- Website: https://ptc.noakhali.gov.bd/en

Location
- Coordinates: 22.8725°N 91.0991°E
- Area: 49.24 acres

Site history
- In use: 1972–present

Garrison information
- Garrison: Noakhali

Police Training Centre, Noakhali (Bengali: পুলিশ ট্রেনিং সেন্টার, নোয়াখালী) is a training facility operated by the Bangladesh Police in Noakhali District.

== History ==
The Police Training Centre, Noakhali, was established in 1972 as the Zonal Police Training School on 28 acres of land in the old Noakhali Police Lines. In 1990, the institution was upgraded and renamed as Police Training Centre, Noakhali, with an expansion that included 21.24 acres of land from the old Noakhali District Jail premises.

In February 2017, Shahidul Islam, Joint Commissioner of the Detective Branch, was appointed commandant of the Police Training Centre, Noakhali, replacing Asaduzzaman Miah.

In July 2011, a group of 24 trainee police constables, including one female, were arrested in Noakhali for using fake freedom fighter certificates to secure their jobs. These constables had been undergoing training at the Police Training Centre, Noakhali, where they had completed five months of a six-month course. Following an investigation, it was found that they had fraudulently obtained their positions through fake documents, specifically by using the freedom fighter quota.

In June 2013, Hasib Aziz was appointed commandant of the Police Training Centre, Noakhali. He was succeeded by Habibur Rahman in March 2015.

After the fall of the Sheikh Hasina-led Awami League government, several senior police officers, including Additional Deputy Inspector General Chowdhury Manjurul Kabir, were sent into forced retirement.

Mir Abu Tawhid, superintendent of police of Rangamati District, was appointed superintendent of Police Training Centre, Noakhali, as its superintendent in September 2024. He replaced Sheikh Md Mizanur Rahman, who was promoted to Additional Deputy Inspector General. Additional Commissioner of the Dhaka Metropolitan Police Mohammad Nurul Amin was appointed additional superintendent of the centre in October.

In January 2025, 14 constables were expelled on the grounds of "disciplinary violations". The dismissed constables believe they were dismissed for being recruited during the Sheikh Hasina-led Awami League rule. Around the same time 14 constables were similarly dismissed from the Police Training Centre, Tangail.

== Training and Courses ==
Initially, the Police Training Centre, Noakhali, was dedicated to training Trainee Recruit Constables (TRC). Over time, it expanded its training scope to include other personnel. A few batches of Forest Guards have also been trained at this centre.

Since 2007, the Police Training Centre, Noakhali, has regularly conducted several important in-service training programs for field officers, including:

- Inspectors’ Preliminary Staff Course
- Sergeant/TSI Refresher Course
- Pre-deployment Course for Formed Police Units
- Pre-SAT training for officers from the Assistant Superintendent of Police (ASP) rank and below
- Training of Trainers Courses
- Firearms training courses for police gunmen
- Human Rights workshops and short courses

In addition to these, basic training for TRCs continues as a core function of the centre.

== See also ==
- Bangladesh Police
- Police Training Centre, Tangail
- Police Training Centre, Rangpur
- Police Staff College, Bangladesh
