= Mohammad Abul Kashem =

- মোহাম্মদ আবুল কাশেম

Commissioner of Chattogram Metropolitan Police
- In office 10 July 2010 – 2 May 2012
- Preceded by: Md. Moniruzzaman
- Succeeded by: Md. Shafiqul Islam

Chief of Bangladesh Railway Police
- In office 12 May 2016 – 18 November 2018
- Preceded by: SM Ruhul Amin
- Succeeded by: Md. Mohsin Hossain

Chief of Anti Terrorism Unit
- In office 20 November 2018 – 31 March 2020
- Preceded by: Md. Shafiqul Islam
- Succeeded by: Md. Kamrul Ahsan

Personal details
- Born: Bangladesh
- Occupation: Police officer

Mohammad Abul Kashem is a retired police officer and former commissioner of Chattogram Metropolitan Police. He is the former chief of Bangladesh Railway Police. He is a former Chief of the Anti Terrorism Unit.

== Career ==
In 2009, Kashem was appointed the additional commissioner of the Dhaka Metropolitan Police. He was the Sylhet Range deputy inspector general before being replaced by Mohammad Mosharraf Hossain Bhuiyan.

On 10 July 2010, Kashem was appointed commissioner of Chattogram Metropolitan Police, replacing Md. Moniruzzaman. Under him, 11 Assistant Commissioners were transferred, marking a significant shuffle of top officers. Md. Shafiqul Islam replaced him as the commissioner of Chattogram Metropolitan Police on 2 May 2012. He was promoted to Additional Inspector General of police in December 2015.

Kashem was appointed the Chief of the Bangladesh Railway Police on 12 May 2016. He tried unsuccessfully to increase the force size from 2400 personnel to 14,000 personnel. He served as the chief till 19 November 2018 before being replaced by Md. Mohsin Hossain.

Kashem was appointed Chief of the Anti Terrorism Unit on 19 November 2018, replacing Md. Shafiqul Islam. He justified crossfire death as long as it was in self-defense and the force was legally used. He served as the chief of the Anti-Terrorism unit till 31 March 2020 before being replaced by Md. Kamrul Ahsan.
