= Police Staff College =

Police Staff College may refer to:

- Police Staff College, Bramshill, England
- Police Staff College, Bangladesh
