= Bangladesh Police Swimming Complex =

Swimming venue in Dhaka, Bangladesh

- Interactive map of Bangladesh Police Swimming Complex
- Location: Dhaka - 1230
- Coordinates: 23.856978°N 90.405129°E
- Owner: Bangladesh Police
- Operator: Armed Police Battalion
- Type: Olympic pool
- Facilities: gymnasium, steam bath and sauna
- Dimensions: Length: 50 Meters; Width: 25 Meters; Depth: 8.5 feet

Construction
- Opened: 24 November 2019
- Construction cost: ৳ 20 Crore

Bangladesh Police Swimming Complex is a swimming sports competition hosting and training swimming pool operated by Bangladesh Police which open in 2019. It is located inside the headquarters of the Armed Police Battalion in Uttara, Dhaka. The sports facility built at a cost of 20 crore Bangladeshi taka. It was inaugurated and opened for use by members of the Bangladesh Police on 24 November 2019. It is also a venue for various swimming sports and water polo.

== Structure ==
It is an open-air 10-lane swimming pool. Apart from organizing various swimming events regularly, it is suitable for organizing water polo games. The size of the swimming pool is 50x25 square meters with a depth of six and a half feet to a maximum of eight and a half feet. Both sides of the pool have galleries with seating for a total of 336 spectators.

== Facilities ==
Apart from the regular swimming pool, the complex has separate gymnasium, steam bath and sauna facilities for swimmers.
