= Golam Moshi =

Bangladeshi politician

Golam Moshi is a Jatiya Party politician, and the former ambassador of Bangladesh to Saudi Arabia. He is the political secretary of Rowshan Ershad, the Leader of the Opposition in Bangladesh Parliament.

== Early life ==
Moshi's father was Abdul Awwal, one of the founders of Awami League and Member of National Assembly of Pakistan. graduated from Dhaka Residential Model College. He completed his bachelor of law from the University of Dhaka.

== Career ==
Moshi worked for a number of multinational companies such as AsiaSat, BP, General Atomics, Hong Kong Telecom and Total Gas.

In September 2013, Moshi was expelled from Jatiya Party and joined the Kazi Zafar Ahmed fraction of the party. In February 2014, Rowshan Ershad appointed him her political secretary.

Moshi was appointed the ambassador of Bangladesh to Saudi Arabia in February 2015. He replaced Md. Shahidul Islam who was appointed the High Commissioner of Bangladesh to Malaysia. He was also the Permanent Representative of Bangladesh to the Organisation of Islamic Cooperation.

Moshi's term ended as the ambassador of Bangladesh to Saudi Arabia in April 2020. Mohammad Javed Patwary succeeded him as the ambassador of Bangladesh to Saudi Arabia. He was reappointed the political secretary of Rowshan Ershad in April 2022. Ershad was the Leader of the Opposition in Bangladesh parliament.
