= Anti Terrorism Unit (Bangladesh) =

Counter terrorism unit

Anti Terrorism Unit সন্ত্রাসবিরোধী ইউনিট
- Emblem of Anti Terrorism Unit
- Abbreviation: ATU

Agency overview
- Formed: 19 November 2019
- Employees: 581

Jurisdictional structure
- Operations jurisdiction: Bangladesh
- General nature: Civilian police

Operational structure
- Headquarters: House: 35, Block K, Sohrawardy Avenue, Baridhara, Dhaka
- Parent agency: Bangladesh Police

Website
- atu.police.gov.bd

The Anti Terrorism Unit (ATU) (Bengali: সন্ত্রাসবিরোধী ইউনিট, এটিইউ) is a specialized unit of the Bangladesh Police dedicated to counterterrorism efforts. It was officially approved in September 2017 under the Ministry of Home Affairs. The unit focuses on preventing and combating terrorism and violent extremism throughout Bangladesh.

== History and Organizational Structure ==
The Anti Terrorism Unit (ATU) of Bangladesh Police was established as a direct response to the increasing threat of terrorism and violent extremism in the country. The need for a specialized counterterrorism force became evident during the 1990's and early 2000's, as radical local organizations carried out numerous targeted killings, bomb attacks, and acts of sabotage. The 2016 Holey Artisan Bakery attack in Dhaka marked a turning point, prompting the government to intensify its counterterrorism efforts and adopt a Zero Tolerance Policy against terrorism and extremism.

In September 2017, the Government of Bangladesh officially approved the formation of the ATU as an intelligence-led, technologically advanced, and proactive unit within Bangladesh Police. Later in November 2019, the government approved the Anti Terrorism Unit Rules, further formalizing the operational framework of the unit.

Operating under the Ministry of Home Affairs and the general supervision of the Inspector General of Police (IGP), the ATU is led by an officer holding the rank of Additional Inspector General of Police (Addl. IGP). The unit is structured into several wings, each focusing on specific aspects of counterterrorism operations. These include Intelligence, Operations,Legal Affairs, Training, and Public Awareness.

The ATU works nationwide, conducting intelligence-based raids with support from specialized police teams such as SWAT, CERT, and bomb disposal squads. Alongside its operational responsibilities, the unit also emphasizes community engagement, holding seminars and workshops to educate students and the public about the dangers of terrorism. In addition, it produces motivational content, counter-narratives, and uses social and electronic media to promote awareness.

ATU also engages in coordination and cooperation with both domestic and international stakeholders in the field of counterterrorism and violent extremism. The unit views the broader community as a key partner in this effort, collaborating with governmental bodies, NGOs, development agencies, and civil society organizations to build resilience and prevent radicalization.

== Training and International Cooperation ==
ATU officers participate in various national and international training programs. Collaborations with organizations like ICITAP and UNODC help enhance their operational capacity in covert operations, intelligence gathering, and counter-extremism strategies.

== Chiefs ==
Former Chiefs of the Anti-Terrorism Unit (ATU)
Name	Term start	Term end	Reference
Md. Shafiqul Islam	7 December 2017	19 November 2018	
Mohammad Abul Kashem	19 November 2018	31 March 2020	
Md. Kamrul Ahsan	20 May 2020	4 September 2022	
S. M. Ruhul Amin			

== Recent Activities ==
Since its establishment, the Anti Terrorism Unit (ATU) has been actively involved in preventing and responding to terrorism and violent extremism across Bangladesh. Below are some of its recent notable operations and initiatives:

=== Counterterrorism Operations and Arrests ===
- In September 2023, three members of a newly emerged militant group called Tawhidiul Uluhiya were arrested by the ATU from multiple districts including Dhaka, Bagerhat, and Joypurhat. The group, also referred to as "Al-Jihadi," was planning coordinated attacks in 2024.
- In December 2023, two operatives of Ansar al-Islam were arrested in Gazipur and Jashore. They were actively engaged in disseminating extremist propaganda through social media platforms.
- In November 2024, the ATU arrested two members of the banned extremist group Ansarullah Bangla Team (ABT) from Dhaka and Noakhali. Seized materials included jihadist literature, leaflets, laptops, and smartphones used for online radicalization.
- In March 2025, the ATU, in a joint operation, arrested Ataullah abu Ammar Jununi, the top commander of the Arakan Rohingya Salvation Army (ARSA), from Narayanganj. He was suspected of militant activities and planning cross-border operations.

== Ranks ==
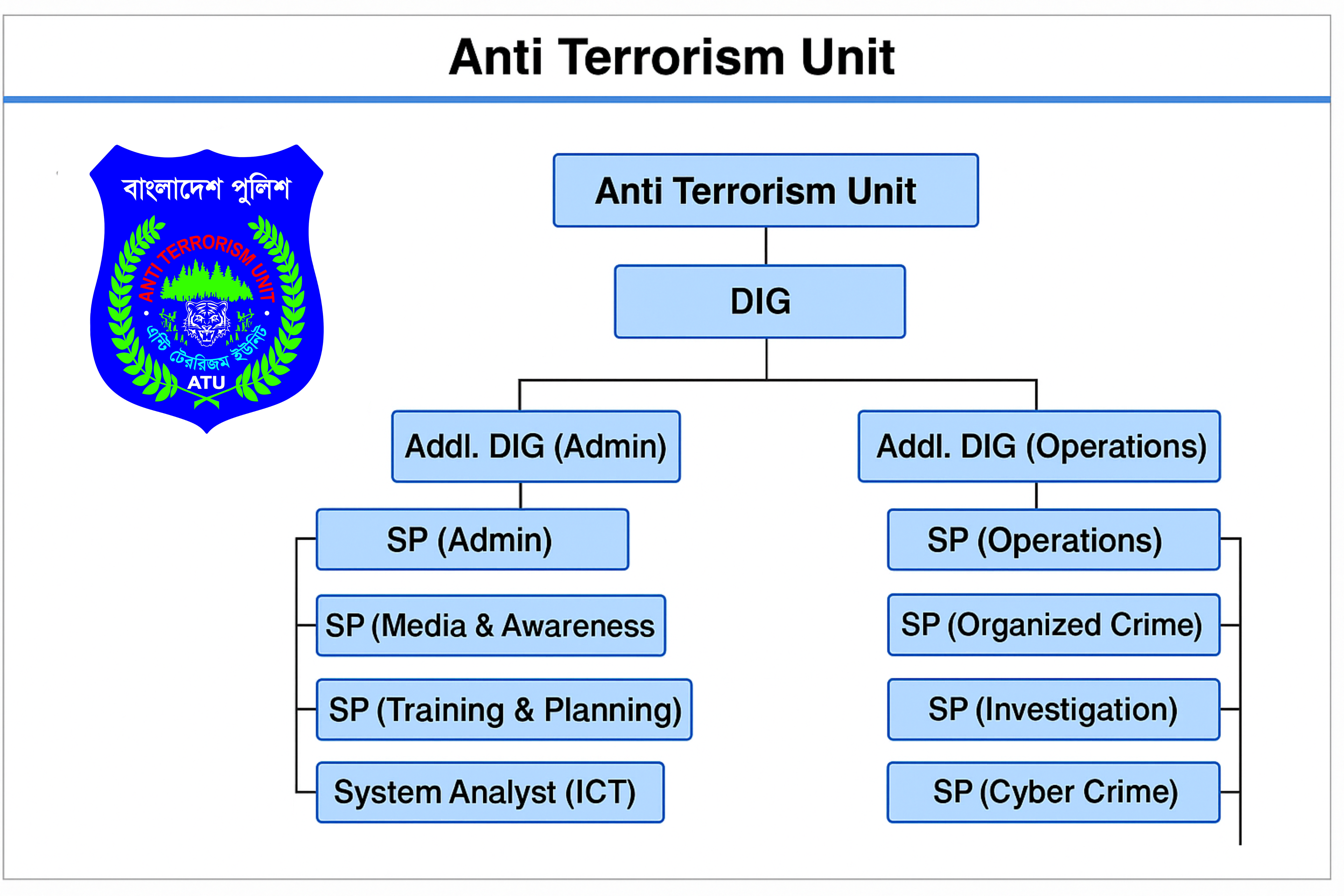

== Units ==
- SWAT Team
- Crime Scene Investigation Team
- Bomb Explosion Investigation Team
- Crisis Emergency Response Team (CERT)
- Explosive Disposal Team
- k-9 Squad (Dog Squad)

== See also ==
- Bangladesh Police
- Dhaka Metropolitan Police
- Rapid Action Battalion
- Bangladesh Ansar
- Bangladesh Armed Forces
- Rapid Action Battalion
