= Police Training Centre, Khulna =

Bangladesh police training school

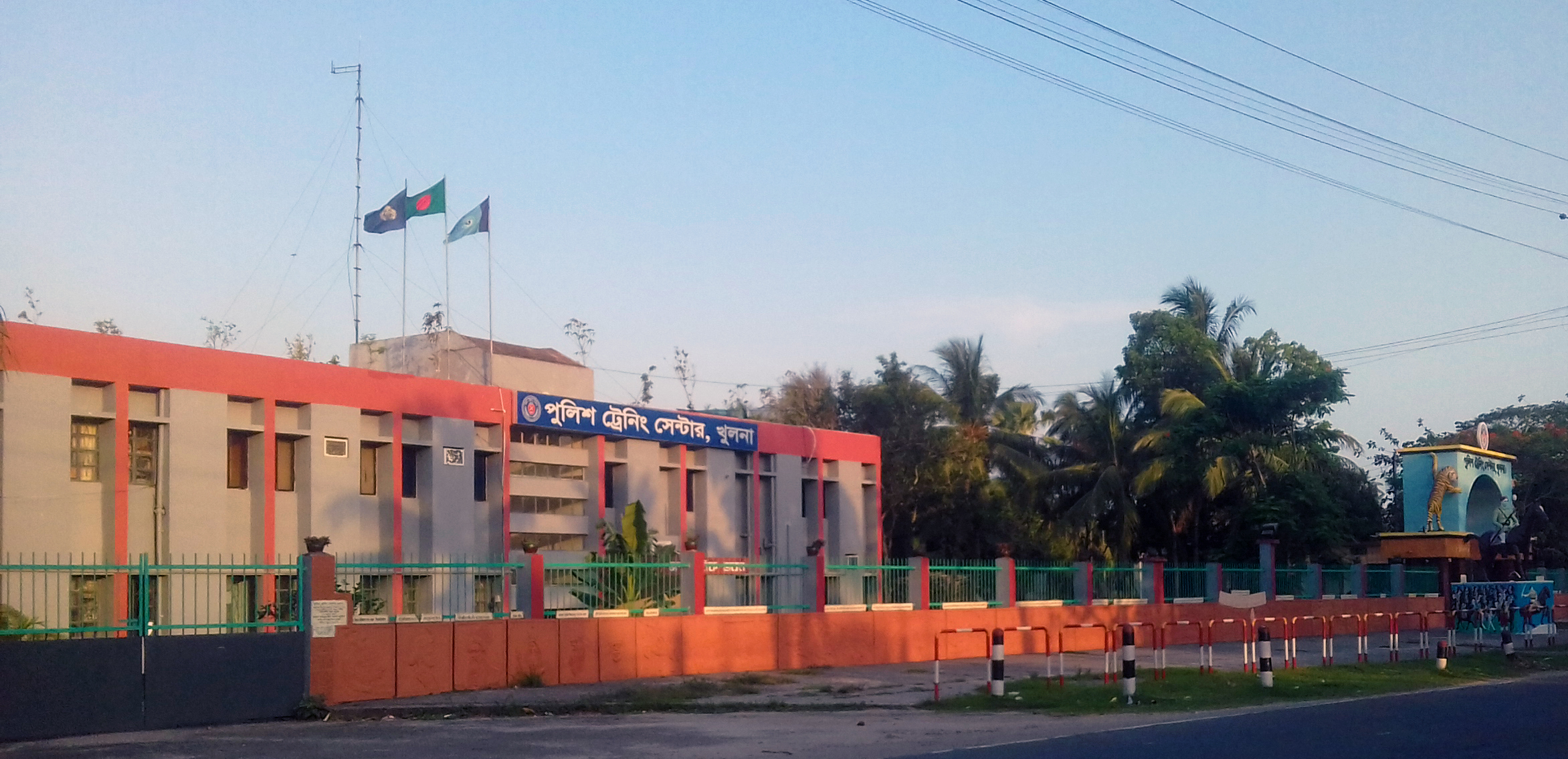

Location
- Jessore Road, Mirerdanga, Khanjahan Ali, Khulna, Khulna Division, Khulna-9206; Bangladesh
- Coordinates: 22.9061°N 89.5081°E

Information
- School type: Police Training Police Training Centre
- Established: 1972
- Commandant: Md. Mahbubur Rahman Bhuiyan
- Area: 17.5 acre

Police Training Centre, Khulna is a police training school of the Bangladesh Police. It is situated on the east side of the Dhaka-Jessore-Khulna Highway.

== History ==
This institution was formed in 1972 as a Zonal Police Training School (ZPTS) at Khalishpur Municipal Market. In 1980, it was shifted to the Jessore Police Lines. On 18 September 1989 this institution was upgraded as Police Training Centre and finally shifted to the present location in Khulna city.

== Facilities ==
Police Training Centre Khulna has two-storeyed administrative building, a five storeyed TRC barrack, a multipurpose hall, a mosque, two-storeyed Commandants quarter, Deputy Commamdants quarter, a six-storeyed SI/ASI quarters, a six-storeyed Constables quarter and three tin-shade barracks. There is also a firing range in Shiromoni of its own.

== Courses ==
This centre mainly provides training to –

Sl. No	Rank of the Trainees	Duration
1	Refreshers Course to Sub Inspector (SI)	8 weeks
2	Recruit Constables (Male)	6 months
