= Md Humayun Kabir Khandaker =

Bangladeshi civil servant

- মোঃ হুমায়ুন কবির খন্দকার
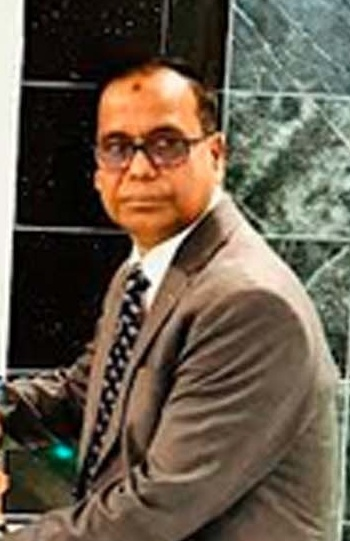

Senior Secretary of the Ministry of Information and Broadcasting
- In office 1 November 2022 – August 2024
- Preceded by: Md Mokbul Hossain
- Succeeded by: Vacant

Personal details
- Citizenship: Bangladesh
- Education: Bachelor's degree and Master's degree in Philosophy
- Alma mater: University of Dhaka
- Occupation: Civil servant

Md Humayun Kabir Khandaker is a Bangladeshi civil servant and the former senior secretary of the Ministry of Information and Broadcasting. He is the former Election Commission Secretary.

== Early life ==
Khandaker did his undergrad and master's in philosophy at the University of Dhaka.

== Career ==
Khandaker joined the Bangladesh Civil Service in 1991 in the admin cadre. In 2014, he received the Information and Communication Technology Award.

In November 2015, Khandaker was the deputy commissioner of Feni District. He served as the personal secretary of Hossain Toufique Imam, political advisor to Prime Minister Sheikh Hasina. He was the additional secretary at the Ministry of Road Transport and Bridges. In 2016, he was awarded the Public Administration Award.

Khandaker was appointed the secretary of the Bangladesh Election Commission in January 2021. He was the former Rajshahi Divisional Commissioner. He was replaced by Md Humayun Kabir as divisional commissioner. In January 2022, Justice Mamnoon Rahman and Justice Khandaker Diliruzzaman issued a ruling asking why contempt of court should not be taken against him and three others for not publishing the results of a ward election in Chittagong. The government asked him and the election commission to investigate Bangladesh Nationalist Party using lobbying firms in the United States.

Khandaker was appointed secretary of the Ministry of Industries in October 2022. He was appointed secretary of the Ministry of Information and Broadcasting following the forced retirement of the former secretary, Md Mokbul Hossain in November 2022. Zakia Sultana appointed to the secretary of the Ministry of Information and Broadcasting was cancelled at the same time. He oversaw the launch of the digitalization of National Institute of Mass Communication services as part of the mygov platform project.

Following the fall of the Sheikh Hasina led Awami League government, Khandaker was appointed an officer on special duty, a punishment posting in the Bangladesh Civil Service.
