= Bangladesh Police Welfare Trust =

Bangladesh Police Welfare Trust (Bangladesh Police Kallyan Trust)
- Government Seal of Bangladesh
- Type: Trust
- Legal status: Welfare Trust
- Headquarters: Dhaka, Bangladesh
- Region served: Bangladesh
- Official language: Bengali
- Website: https://bpkt.police.gov.bd/

Bangladesh Police Welfare Trust (Bangladesh Police Kallyan Trust) is a trust owned and operated by Bangladesh Police for the welfare of police personnel.

== History ==
Bangladesh Police Welfare Trust (Bangladesh Police Kallyan Trust) is a concern of Bangladesh Police. The Trust is responsible for the management of Community Bank Bangladesh Limited. In 2006, the Trust held rock concerts on police line fields to raise funds for itself. The trust provides academic scholarships to students who are family members of police officers.

The Trust built Police Plaza Concord, a high-rise shopping mall, in partnership with Concord Group. The Plaza was inaugurated by Prime Minister Sheikh Hasina on 11 June 2015. In 2015, the Trust financed the movie Dhaka Attack, which was centered on a SWAT team of Bangladesh Police.
