= Special Security and Protection Battalion =

Specialized unit of the Bangladesh Police

- স্পেশাল সিকিউরিটি অ্যান্ড প্রটেকশন ব্যাটালিয়ন
- Insignia of SPBn
- Active: March 2012 - present
- Country: Bangladesh
- Agency: Bangladesh Police
- Type: Protective security unit
- Headquarters: Uttara
- Abbreviation: SPBn; এসপিবিএন (Bengali)

Structure
- Battalions: 2 Battalions

Commanders
- Current commander: Abdullah Al Mahmood as Additional Inspector General (Addl IG)
- Notable commanders: Md. Haider Ali Khan, Superintendent of Police (Commanding Officer)

The Special Security and Protection Battalion (SPBN) (Bengali: স্পেশাল সিকিউরিটি অ্যান্ড প্রটেকশন ব্যাটালিয়ন) is a specialized unit of the Bangladesh Police. The battalion provides protection to the President of Bangladesh, Prime Minister of Bangladesh, and any person designated as VIP by the government, including visiting foreign dignitaries. It is also responsible for the security of VIPs’ offices and residences and venues of programs. It works alongside Special Security Force, Special Branch, Dhaka Metropolitan Police and President Guard Regiment.

Though it was formed on December 26, 2011, it formally started operation on 4 July 2013.

== Organization ==
This specialized unit of Bangladesh Police is headed by an Additional Inspector General of Police. Primarily, the SPBn has two specialized battalions each headed by a Superintendent of Police (Commanding Officer). Each battalion has 700 members including 12 additional superintendents, 15 assistant superintendents, 33 inspectors with sub-inspectors, assistant sub-inspectors, naik and constables. All the officers and personnel come from Bangladesh Police through an intensive selection procedure.

== Training ==
It has primary responsibility for the safety of VIPs and visiting dignitaries to Bangladesh. Therefore, the compulsory training techniques taught to all SPBn officers/members include VIP protection and unarmed combat.

They also undergo training in firearms, attack and ambush, motorcade protection, crowd control, self-defense, tactical driving, physical and tactical training, swimming, search and sweeping techniques, IED and EOD training, fire evacuation and crisis management and basic trauma life support. They practice simulation exercises in the firing range. Out of their internal training wing, the trainers from Special Security Force, President Guard Regiment, Fire Service and Civil Defense department and other training experts from Bangladesh Police conduct the training. The courses vary from two to six weeks. Mahiuddin Khan Alomgir, Minister of Home Affairs, inaugurated the first training course for the officers of SPBn.

== Vehicles ==
Nissan Patrol Y61 and Toyota Land Cruiser 200 Series are the SUVs often deployed in protective missions.

== Weapons ==
The standard issue sidearms for all SPBn is the Glock 17 and the Glock 19 while the short version of the Heckler & Koch MP5 is the standard SMG and could be deployed in multiple variants. SPBn started to use the SMT9 SMG from March 2015. Type 56 assault rifle also used by SPBn.

Apart from firearms, ASP expandable batons or tasers are carried for less-than-lethal options to the SPBn officers. Stun grenades and smoke grenades are also used to provide cover for escorting the VIP when under attack.

== See also ==
- List of protective service agencies
- Special Security Force
- President Guard Regiment
