= Zakia Sultana =

Bangladeshi civil servant

Zakia Sultana is a retired Bangladeshi civil servant and senior secretary of the Ministry of Industries. She was the secretary of the Ministry of Information and Broadcasting.

== Early life ==
Sultana was born in 1968 in Singra Upazila, Natore District, East Pakistan, Pakistan. She completed her undergraduate and graduate studies in anatomy from the Institute of Postgraduate Medicine and Research in 1989 and 1991 respectively. She has a masters from Victoria University, Melbourne in Environmental Management.

== Career ==
Sultana joined the Bangladesh Civil Service in 1991.

Sultana was the Additional Secretary of the Financial Institutions Division of the Ministry of Finance.

In January 2021, Sultana was appointed chairman of Bangladesh Energy and Power Research Council. On 16 May 2021, Sultana was appointed secretary of the Ministry of Industries. She is a director of the Bangladesh Industrial Technical Assistance Center. She is a director of Dhaka Shishu Hospital and BIRDEM. She is a director of Palli Sanchay Bank.

On 27 October 2022, Sultana was appointed the secretary of the Ministry of Information and Broadcasting. Her appointment was cancelled in November 2022 and instead Md Humayun Kabir Khandaker, former secretary of the Election Commission and incumbent secretary of the Ministry of Industries, was appointed secretary of the Ministry of Information and Broadcasting. She was returned to the Ministry of Industries. This happened after the incumbent, Md Mokbul Hossain, was sent into forced retirement.

Sultana signed an agreement with ICT Secretary Md Shamsul Arefin to improve supply chains. She was promoted to senior secretary on 27 October 2023. She is the vat policy member of the National Board of Revenue. Following the fall of the Sheikh Hasina led Awami League government, she was sent into forced retirement.

== Personal life ==
Sultana is married to Md. Atiqul Islam, Additional Inspector General of Bangladesh Police.
