= Shahjahanpur Thana =

Thana in Dhaka South City Corporation, Bangladesh

Shahjahanpur Thana শাহজাহানপুর থানা
- Thana
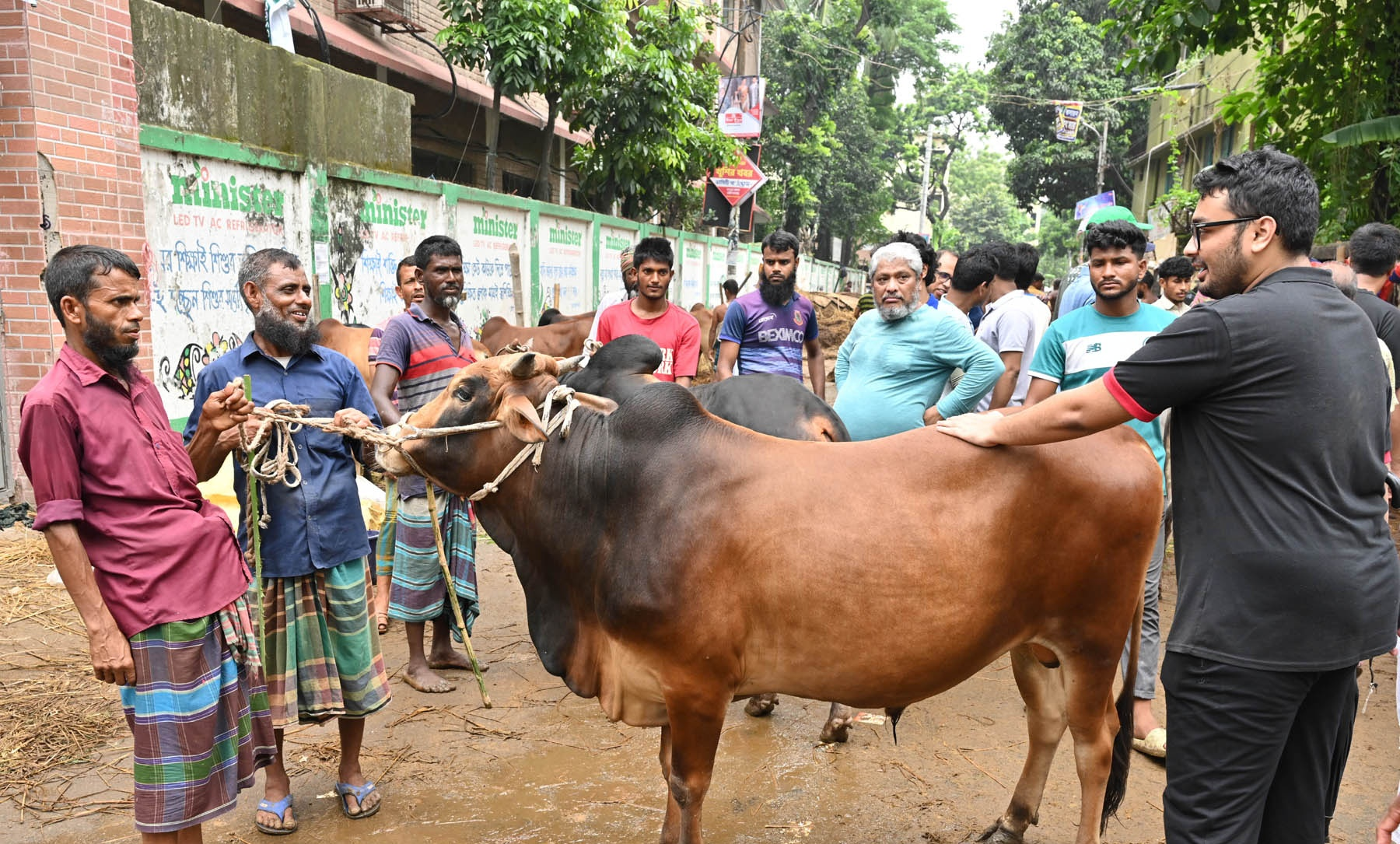
- Shahjahanpur Cattle Market before Eid-ul-Adha
- Interactive map of Shahjahanpur Thana
- Coordinates: 23.7389°N 90.4254°E
- Country: Bangladesh
- Division: Dhaka Division
- District: Dhaka District
- City corporation: Dhaka South City Corporation
- Formed: 2012

Area
  - Total: 1.77 km^{2} (0.68 sq mi)

Population (2022)
  - Total: 111,771
- Time zone: UTC+6
- Postal code: 1217
- Area code: 02

Shahjahanpur Thana (Bengali: শাহজাহানপুর থানা) is a thana (precinct) in Dhaka South City Corporation, Bangladesh. It is regarded as one of the most densely populated areas in Dhaka.

== Background ==
Shahjahanpur is considered an older settlement, once classified as a suburban area of Dhaka. According to local tradition, the area is named after Mughal emperor Shah Jahan who reportedly spent time here in the year 1624 prior to his ascension to the throne.

In 2012, Shahjahanpur Thana was formed after splitting from Motijheel Thana, becoming the 47th thana of Dhaka metropolitan area.

== Geography ==
Shahjahanpur Thana covers 1.77 square kilometres (0.68 sq mi). To the north of the area lies Khilgaon, while to the south are Rajarbagh, Shantinagar, and Motijheel. The eastern boundary is marked by the Khilgaon Flyover, while to the west are Shantibag and Malibagh.

The boundary description of the precinct is as follows:

- To the north, it traces the southern side of Atish Deepankar Road (Bishwa Road) along the railway station's boundary wall, extending to Khilgaon Railway Crossing and then to Malibagh Rail Crossing.
- To the south, it passes through Gopibag Bazaar, Box Culvert Road, and Rail Crossing alongside the canal, ending at Atish Deepankar Road.
- Towards the east, it aligns with the western side of Atish Deepankar Road along the railway station's boundary, continuing through Khilgaon Railway Crossing to Box Culvert Road Crossing.
- On the western side, it crosses Malibagh Railway Crossing, Mouchak Road, Malibagh Road, Rajarbagh, and Chanmari Railway Crossing, reaching the Inland Container Depot.

== Demographics ==
Religions in Shahjahanpur Thana (2022)
Religion	Percent
Islam	95.87%
Hinduism	3.97%
Other or not stated	0.16%

According to the 2022 Bangladeshi census, Shahjahanpur Thana had 28,628 households and a population of 111,777. 6.41% of the population were under 5 years of age. Shahjahanpur had a literacy rate (age 7 and over) of 89.38%: 91.24% for males and 87.30% for females, and a sex ratio of 111.23 males for every 100 females.

== See also ==
- Thanas of Bangladesh
