= Mallick Faqrul Islam =

Bangladeshi police officer

- Born: Bagerhat District, Bangladesh
- Education: Law degree, MBA, PhD
- Known for: Rector, Police Staff College, Bangladesh
- Police career
- Country: Bangladesh Police
- Allegiance: Bangladesh
- Rank: Additional Inspector General of Police (retd.)

Mallick Faqrul Islam is a retired Bangladeshi police officer and rector of Police Staff College, Bangladesh. He is the former additional inspector general of police of the Highway Police. He was the deputy inspector general of Special Branch.

== Early life ==
Islam was born in Bagerhat District. He has a law degree, an MBA, and a PhD.

== Career ==
Islam joined the police branch of Bangladeshi Civil Service in 1991. He was appointed an assistant superintendent of police.

In 2009, Islam was the superintendent of police of Feni District in 2009. He was the deputy commissioner of Dhaka Metropolitan Police. He was appointed chief of the Highway Police in January 2015.

Islam served as the commanding officer of Rapid Action Battalion-3 in 2014 when 18 of his men where withdrawn for embezzling from a suspect. He had served in the United Nations Transitional Administration in East Timor.

In February 2016, Islam was promoted to deputy inspector general. In October 2016, Islam was appointed deputy inspector general of Special Branch from the Highway Police. He was replaced by Deputy Inspector General Md. Atiqul Islam.

In August 2022, Islam's name was suggested as a potential replacement for Inspector General of Police Benazir Ahmed or future director general of Rapid Action Battalion.

In February 2023, Islam was appointed the rector of the Police Staff College in Dhaka. He was elected vice president of the International Association of Police Academies. He is the president of the Bangladesh Police Billiard and Snooker Club.

Islam was sent into forced retirement along with fellow officers Y. M. Belalur Rahman and Selim Md Jahangir in January 2025.

== Personal life ==
Islam's wife, Jesmin Ahmed Mallick, died after a fall from the rooftop of their residence in Bashundhara Residential Area on 8 May 2016. He has a daughter and a son.
