= Highway Police (Bangladesh) =

Highway Police হাইওয়ে পুলিশ
- Motto: Disciplined Secured Highway

Agency overview
- Formed: 11 June 2005

Jurisdictional structure
- Operations jurisdiction: Bangladesh
- Governing body: Ministry of Home Affairs
- General nature: Civilian police

Operational structure
- Headquarters: 34, Shahjalal Avenue, Sector # 4, Uttara, Dhaka-1230
- Elected officer responsible: Salahuddin Ahmed, Minister of Home Affairs
- Agency executive: Faruk Ahmed, Additional Inspector General
- Parent agency: Bangladesh Police

Website
- www.highwaypolice.gov.bd
- Service uniform: Yankees Blue, Light French Beige Combat uniform: Navy Blue, Yankees Blue

The Highway Police is a specialized unit of the Bangladesh Police that is responsible for law enforcement on Bangladesh roads. The unit is led by an Additional inspector general of Bangladesh Police. Faruk Ahmed has been serving as the chief of the Highway Police since 7 July 2026.

== History ==
The Highway Police was established on 11 June 2005 by the Bangladesh Nationalist Party government. It can only investigate crimes under a few sections of Penal Code 1860 and the Motor Vehicle Ordinance, 1983. The Highway Police has jurisdiction over 5,487 kilometre of national highways and 4,165 kilometre of local roads.

On 28 August 2018, the Highway Police suspended the Officer in Charge of Bonpara Highway Police Station GM Shamsun Nur. This was after a bus without proper registration papers was involved in a fatal road accident in which 15 people died.

== List of Chiefs of Highway Police ==
Name	Term start	Term end	Reference
Syed Shahjaman Raj	11 June 2005	20 October 2005	
Sheikh Mohammad Sazzad Ali	20 October 2005	22 March 2006	
Md. Amir Uddin	22 March 2006	27 November 2006	
Mohammad Najibur Rahman	3 December 2006	8 February 2007	
Md. Saiful Alam	4 March 2007	14 April 2007	
M. Sadikur Rahman	12 June 2007	31 August 2008	
Md. Sohorab Hossain	31 August 2008	24 February 2011	
Md. Humayun Kabir	24 February 2011	5 November 2012	
Md. Asaduzzaman Mia	5 November 2012	7 January 2015	
Mallik Faqrul Islam	18 January 2015	31 October 2016	
Md. Atiqul Islam	6 November 2016	2 July 2019	
Mahbubur Rahman	17 June 2019	5 May 2020	
Md. Delwar Hossain Mia	17 October 2024	—	

== Units ==
List of Highway Region and Police Stations:

Highway Region	Highway Police Stations	Administrative District
Cumilla	Mainamati Crossing	Comilla
Cumilla	Daudkandi	Comilla
Cumilla	Mahipal	Feni
Cumilla	Raozan	Chattogram
Cumilla	Baro Aulia	Chattogram
Cumilla	Ramu Crossing	Cox's Bazar
Cumilla	Dohazari	Charrogram
Cumilla	Chandraganj	Lakshmipur
Gazipur	Gorai	Tangail
Gazipur	Bhober Char	Munshiganj
Gazipur	Itakhola	Narsingdi
Gazipur	Barangail	Manikganj
Gazipur	Elenga	Tangail
Gazipur	Nawjore	Gazipur
Gazipur	Shyamganj	Mymensingh
Gazipur	Salna	Gazipur
Gazipur	Mawna	Gazipur
Gazipur	Savar	Dhaka
Gazipur	Golra	Manikganj
Gazipur	Nandail	Mymensingh
Gazipur	Kanchpur	Narayanganj
Gazipur	Hashara	Munshiganj
Gazipur	Bakshiganj	Jamalpur
Sylhet	Shaistaganj	Habiganj
Sylhet	Khatihata	Brahmanbaria
Sylhet	Bhairab	Kishoreganj
Sylhet	Sherpur	Moulvibazar
Bogra	Hatikumrul	Sirajganj
Bogra	Boda	Panchagarh
Bogra	Bara Dargar Hat	Rangpur
Bogra	Kundar Hat	Bogra
Bogra	Sherpur	Bogra
Bogra	Jhalmalia	Natore
Bogra	Madpur	Pabna
Bogra	Pakshi	Pabna
Bogra	Paba	Rajshahi
Bogra	Banpara	Natore
Bogra	Gobindaganj	Gaibandha
Bogra	Tentulia	Panchagarh
Bogra	Taraganj	Rangpur
Bogra	Dashmail	Dinajpur
Bogra	Hatibandha	Lalmonirhat
Madaripur	Bhanga	Faridpur
Madaripur	Shibchar	Madaripur
Madaripur	Bhatiapara	Gopalganj
Madaripur	Mostafapur	Madaripur
Madaripur	Chaurhas	Kushtia
Madaripur	Nabharan	Jessore
Madaripur	Arappur	Jhenaidah
Madaripur	Mollarhat	Bagerhat
Madaripur	Ramnagar	Magura
Madaripur	Karimpur	Faridpur
Madaripur	Tularampur	Narail
Madaripur	Pangsha	Rajbari
Madaripur	Ahladipur	Rajbari
Madaripur	Gaurnadi	Barishal
Madaripur	Barobazar	Jashore
Madaripur	Noapara	Jashore
Madaripur	Katakhali	Bagerhat
Madaripur	Kharnia	Khulna
