= Airport Armed Police =

Unit of Bangladesh police

- এয়ারপোর্ট আর্মড পুলিশ
- Insignia of Airport Armed Police
- Active: 1 June 2010 - present
- Country: Bangladesh
- Agency: Bangladesh Police
- Headquarters: Hazrat Shahjalal International Airport, Dhaka
- Motto: শৃঙ্খলা নিরাপত্তা প্রগতি Discipline Safety Progress
- Common name: Airport APBn
- Abbreviation: AAP

Structure
- Subunits: Uniformed Guard and Checking Team; Intelligence Team; Crisis Response Team; Observation & Assessment Team; K-9 Unit; Bomb Disposal Unit

Equipment
- Vehicles: Armored vehicles

Website
- Official website

The Airport Armed Police (AAP) is the specialized unit of Bangladesh Police responsible for security in the Hazrat Shahjalal International Airport of Dhaka, the largest and busiest airport of Bangladesh. The AAP is one of the battalions of the Armed Police Battalion (APBn) in Bangladesh.

== History ==
Armed Police Battalion (APBn) is empowered to ensure internal security, arrest armed terrorist, recover arms & explosives, and any other responsibility endowed upon by the Government as per Section 6 of the Armed Police Battalion Ordinance, 1979. The government of Bangladesh deployed the armed police battalion to take over the responsibility of overall security of the airport on 1 June 2010. In order to perform its duty more effectively and efficiently within its jurisdiction, Airport Armed Police works in coordination with other law enforcement agencies in the Airport including Civil Aviation Authority of Bangladesh, Bangladesh Customs, different intelligence units, and other similar organizations.

== Organization ==
A total of 1,100 personnel (including 100 female members) have been performing the security responsibility in the largest airport of Bangladesh. Airport Armed Police has four types of team for securing the airport namely:

1. Uniformed Guard and Checking Team
2. Intelligence Team
3. Crisis Response Team (CRT)
4. Observation & Assessment Team
5. K-9 Unit

=== Area of responsibility ===
Airport Armed Police performs the responsibility of securing the airport independently. According to the directions from Ministry of Civil Aviation and Tourism and Bangladesh Police Headquarters. Some of the services provided by the organization are as follows

1. Ensuring the overall security: Ensuring overall security of the airport by preventing any type of subversive acts, illegal trespass of unwanted and unauthorized persons, preventing luggage pilferage/theft and protecting passengers from any sort of harassment at the airport.
2. Freeing illegal parking area: Before deployment of AAP, the car parking area in front of arrival terminal 1 and 2 were being used as a source of illegal income where middlemen could park their cars illegally. AAP in a special drive freed the occupied car parking which enhanced the beauty of the airport as well as reduced the chance of the middlemen to harass passengers and visitors.
3. Reduction of luggage theft: AAP first started working on the aim at reducing pilferage and theft of valuable luggage of the valued passengers which was a common phenomenon at that time. Subsequently, AAP has succeeded in reducing the pilferage and theft to a minimum, thanks to the sincerest duty performed by AAP members around the belt areas. Almost all the Airlines operating in the airport are experiencing the pleasant result of it. Airport armed Police significantly managed to minimize passenger harassment by unscrupulous agents like middlemen, hawkers, beggars, street archins etc. Regular drives are being operated to find out these disturbing people and stern actions are being taken against them.
4. Coordination: Coordination with other agencies working at the airport regarding any subversive activities, prevention of militancy or any other security related threats.
