= Detective Training School =

Coordinates: 23.7381°N 90.4169°E

Detective Training School (DTS)

Location
- Rajarbag, Dhaka; Bangladesh

Information
- Type: Police Training
- Established: July 25, 1962

Detective Training School (DTS) is maintained by Criminal Investigation Department (CID) of Bangladesh Police. It is situated on 0.727 acres (2,940 m^{2}) of land at Rajarbag in Dhaka. It arranges various courses in the area of investigation and supervision. Since the inception this institute has produced a good number of highly professional investigating and detective officers. It is headed by a senior police officer in the rank of Additional DIG designated as the Commandant of this school. It was established on 25 July 1962.

== Courses ==
This school mainly provides training to –

Sl. No	Name of the Courses	Duration	Rank of the Trainees
04 weeks	ASI/ SI of Drugs & Narcotics		
8	PR System	03 weeks	Inspector/SI/ASI
