= TotalEnergies Gas & Power =

French-owned UK company

TotalEnergies Gas & Power Limited
- Company type: Limited company (subsidiary of TotalEnergies)
- Industry: Utilities
- Founded: 1987 (as AGAS Limited)
- Headquarters: Kingswood, United Kingdom
- Area served: United Kingdom
- Key people: Dave Cranfield, Sion Roberts
- Products: Gas; Electricity
- Parent: TotalEnergies
- Website: business.totalenergies.uk

TotalEnergies Gas & Power is a business energy provider in the UK. A wholly owned subsidiary of French Oil Supermajor TotalEnergies. It is the largest industrial and commercial natural gas supplier in the UK.

== History ==
Formed during the deregulation of the business gas market in 1987 as AGAS Limited, it is the first independent supplier of gas to the UK market. In 1996 the company became a wholly owned subsidiary of Elf Aquitaine and changed its name to Elf Business Energy in 1999. When the parent group Elf Aquitaine merged with Total Fina to become TotalFinaElf in 2000 the company name was changed to TotalFinaElf Gas and Power Limited. In 2003 the company name was changed to Total Gas & Power Limited as part of the global rebranding of the Total Group.
