= Railway Police (Bangladesh) =

Rail security unit of Bangladesh Police

Railway Police রেলওয়ে পুলিশ

Agency overview
- Formed: 1881; 145 years ago
- Employees: 2,432

Jurisdictional structure
- Operations jurisdiction: Bangladesh
- Governing body: Ministry of Home Affairs
- General nature: Civilian police

Operational structure
- Headquarters: House# 12/C, Road# 105, Gulshan- 2, Dhaka, Bangladesh
- Elected officer responsible: Salahuddin Ahmed, Minister of Home Affairs
- Agency executive: Zillur Rahman (police), Additional Inspector General
- Parent agency: Bangladesh Police

Facilities
- Stations: 24 Stations

Website
- railwaypolice.gov.bd
- Service uniform: Yankees Blue, Light French Beige Combat uniform: Navy Blue, Yankees Blue

The Railway Police (or Government Railway Police) (Bengali: রেলওয়ে পুলিশ) is a specialized unit of the Bangladesh Police responsible for the security of rail properties and investigation of crimes committed on Bangladesh Railway properties.

== Units ==
Railway Police has six districts, Chattogram Railway Police, Syedpur Railway Police, Pakshi Railway Police, Dhaka Railway Police, Khulna Railway Police and Sylhet Railway Police. The force is led by an additional inspector general of Bangladesh Police.

List of police stations of GRP
GRP District	GRP Police Station	Administrative Police Station	Administrative District
Dhaka	Dhaka	Motijheel	Dhaka
Dhaka	Mymensingh	Mymensingh Sadar	Mymensingh
Dhaka	Jamalpur	Jamalpur Sadar	Jamalpur
Dhaka	Bhairab	Bhairab	Kishoreganj
Dhaka	Kishoreganj	Kishoreganj Sadar	Kishoreganj
Chattogram	Chattogram	Kotwali	Chattogram
Chattogram	Chandpur	Chandpur	Chandpur
Chattogram	Laksam	Laksam	Cumilla
Saidpur	Saidpur	Saidpur	Nilphamari
Saidpur	Lalmonirhat	Lalmonirhat Sadar	Lalmonirhat
Saidpur	Parbatipur	Parbatipur	Dinajpur
Saidpur	Dinajpur	Dinajpur Sadar	Dinajpur
Pakshi	Ishwardi	Ishwardi	Pabna
Pakshi	Bonarpara	Saghata	Gaibandha
Pakshi	Rajshahi	Chandrima	Rajshahi
Pakshi	Santahar	Adamdighi	Bogura
Pakshi	Sirajganj Bazar	Sirajganj Sadar	Sirajganj
Khulna	Khulna	Kotwali	Khulna
Khulna	Rajbari	Rajbari Sadar	Rajbari
Khulna	Poradaha	Mirpur	Kushtia
Sylhet	Sylhet	South Surma	Sylhet
Sylhet	Akhaura	Akhaura	Brahmanbaria
Sylhet	Sreemangal	Sreemangal	Moulvibazar
Sylhet	Kulaura	Kulaura	Moulvibazar

== Former chiefs ==
Former Additional IGPs of Bangladesh Railway Police
Name	Term start	Term end	Reference
Mohammad Abul Kashem	12 May 2016	19 November 2018	
Md. Mohsin Hossain	19 November 2018	28 February 2021	
Md. Didar Ahmed	25 May 2021	14 January 2024	
Devdas Bhattacharya, BPM	13 March 2024	22 September 2024	
Sardar Tamizuddin Ahmed, BPM	16 October 2024	16 September 2025	
Zillur Rahman	September 2025	current	

== Controversy ==
The Railway Police, as of 2013, had 1600 personnel. In 2014, the government of Bangladesh announced plans to expand the railway force. On 11 July 2016, a 65 year old veteran of Bangladesh Liberation War was beaten to death by members of Railway Police in Jamalpur Railway Police Station.

In 2019, the officer in charge of Khulna Railway Police Station and other officers were accused of raping a woman and arresting her on false allegation. The court of the chief judicial magistrate sent an order to the superintendent of railway police in August 2019. Pakshey Railway Police and Railway Police headquarters opened two separate investigation on the allegation. The victim filed a case against five police officers including the officer-in-charge, Osman Goni, with the Women and Children Repression Prevention Tribunal-3 on 24 September 2019. The court directed the Police Bureau of Investigation to investigate the case.
