= Police Training Centre, Rangpur =

Location
- R.K Road, Rangpur; Rangpur, Bangladesh; 25.746°N 89.233°E

Information
- Motto: Discipline, Security, progress
- Established: 1972; 54 years ago
- Commandant: Bashu Deb, DIG
- Language: Bangla, English
- Area: 30 acres (120,000 m^{2})
- Website: ptcrangpur.police.gov.bd

Police Training Centre, Rangpur was incepted in 1972 at Rangpur police lines as the Zonal Police Training School (ZPTS) of Bangladesh Police. As the numbers of the trainees were increasing with the pace of time, the necessity of improving the standard of the training institute was felt. So, it became essential to settle this institute at a different location. Consequently, 20 acres (81,000 m^{2}) of land was acquired on 1 July 1990.

Later the Police Training School was upgraded into Police Training Centre (PTC) further developing its standard. Now a Commandant (DIG of Police) commands this Police Training Centre.

== Courses offered ==
This centre mainly provides training to –

Sl. No	Rank of the Trainees	Duration
1	Refreshers Course to Assistant Sub Inspector (ASI)	8 weeks
2	Recruit Constables (Male & Female)	6 months
