= Shamsuddoha Khandaker =

Shamsuddoha Khandaker is a retired additional inspector general of the Bangladesh Police and former chairman of the Bangladesh Inland Water Transport Authority.

== Career ==
Khandaker joined the Bangladesh Civil Service as a police cadre in 1986.

In April 2004, deputy inspector general of police, Khandaker, was removed from Khulna Range and made an officer on special duty.

Khandaker was put in charge of training at the headquarters of the Bangladesh Police on 30 January 2007. In 2011, he was promoted to additional inspector general of the Bangladesh Police. He was then appointed chairperson of the Bangladesh Inland Water Transport Authority. He faced allegations of corruption and irregularities during his tenure at the Bangladesh Inland Water Transport Authority.

In 2014, Khandaker led rescue operations following the sinking of MV Miraj-4. He was the chairman of the committee formed to remove illegal structures from Buriganga riverbank by the Ministry of Shipping.

Commodore Mohammad Mozammel Haque replaced Khandaker as chairman of the Bangladesh Inland Water Transport Authority in 2015. He retired from Bangladesh Police on 3 March 2016.

On 2 July 2024, the Anti-Corruption Commission sued Khandaker and his wife, Ferdausi Sultana, on corruption charges with the Dhaka Metropolitan Special Judge Court. The commission stated that while Khandaker and his wife estimated the value of their various land holdings at 700 million takas, the commission estimated it to be more than five billion BDT. He had also occupied a government building in Gulshan without paying rent for eight years and applied to Ministry of Housing and Public Works to allocate the property to him.

Khandaker owns Raha Engineering Workshop Beauty Studio which manufactures amusement park rides. The company also owns Wonderela Green Park in Nawabganj. He owns Organic Agro Farms.
