= Rajarbagh =

Area of Dhaka, Bangladesh

Coordinates: 23.7400°N 90.4181°E

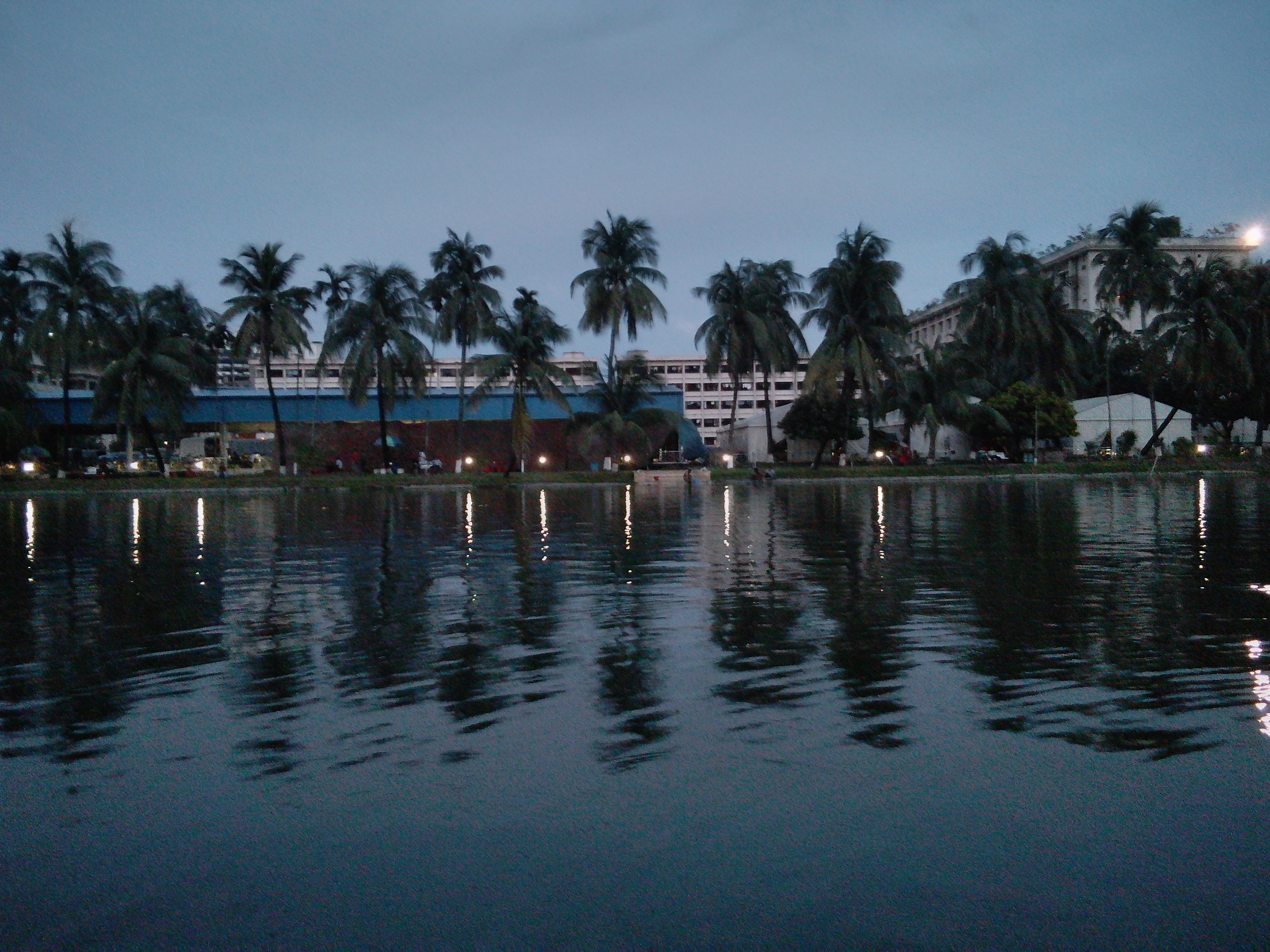
Police line on a lake in Rajarbagh.

Rajarbagh is a residential area of Dhaka, Bangladesh. It is under Shahjahanpur Thana and falls under the jurisdiction of Dhaka South City Corporation. There is a police line in Rajarbagh. The areas adjacent to it are Shantinagar, Motijheel, Malibagh, Shantibagh, Momenbagh, Shahidbagh, Siddheshwari and Shahjahanpur.

== History ==
On 25 March 1971, the Pakistan Army attacked the Rajarbagh police line with the start of Operation Searchlight.

== Installations ==
- Rajarbagh Police Line Hospital
- Rajarbag Police Lines School and College
- Bangladesh Police Museum
- Central Police Hospital
