= Md Mokbul Hossain (secretary) =

- মোঃ মকবুল হোসেন
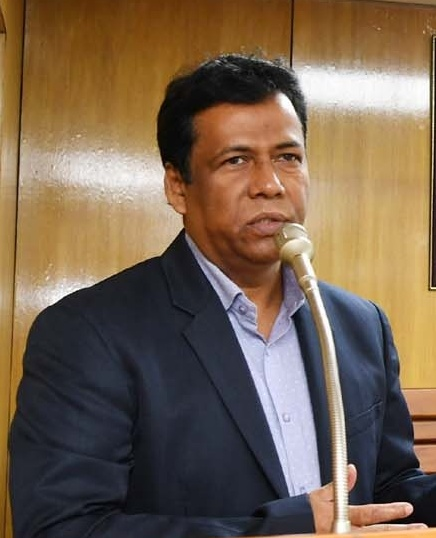
- Born: Ballavepur, Kumarkhali Upazila, Kushtia District, Bangladesh
- Citizenship: Bangladesh
- Education: Bangladesh Agricultural University
- Occupation: Civil servant
- Years active: 1991–2022
- Employer: Government of Bangladesh
- Known for: Secretary of the Ministry of Information and Broadcasting
- Office: Secretary of the Ministry of Information and Broadcasting
- Predecessor: Khaja Mia
- Successor: Zakia Sultana
- Spouse: Israt Jahan Nina
- Children: 2

Md Mokbul Hossain is a retired Ministry of Information and Broadcasting Secretary. He was sent into forced retirement before his tenure ended citing public interest.

== Early life ==
Hossain was born in Ballavepur, Kumarkhali Upazila, Kushtia District. He completed his undergraduate in agriculture economics at the Bangladesh Agricultural University.

== Career ==
Hossain joined the 10th batch of the Bangladesh Civil Service in 1991 as an admin cadre. He served as Assistant Commissioner of Land and Upazila Nirbahi Officer. He was the deputy commissioner of Dinajpur District.

Hossain was the Additional Secretary in the Ministry of Textiles and Jute.

On 31 May 2021, Hossain was appointed secretary of the Ministry of Information and Broadcasting. He was previously the Registrar of Joint Stock Companies And Firms. Under him, in 2020, a record number of companies were registered.

Hossain was sent into forced retirement by the Ministry of Public Administration of the government of Bangladesh in October 2022 citing "public interest". There was widespread speculation in the media about his termination. He denied being disloyal to the government and claimed he was a member of the Bangladesh Chhatra League, the student wing of the ruling Awami League, as a student at Bangladesh Agricultural University. He denied allegations of ties with the opposition Bangladesh Nationalist Party and its vice-chairman, Tarique Rahman, in London. Justice Md Nazrul Islam Talukder and Justice Khizir Hayat Lizu of the High Court Division asked the Anti-Corruption Commission if they had taken any action on the corruption allegations against Hossain. Zakia Sultana was appointed to replace him but she was replaced two months later by Humayun Kabir Khandakar.

== Personal life ==
Hossain is married to Israt Jahan Nina. They have two daughters.
