= River Police (Bangladesh) =

Police unit in Bangladesh

River Police নৌ পুলিশ

Agency overview
- Formed: 2013; 13 years ago

Jurisdictional structure
- National agency: Bangladesh
- Operations jurisdiction: Bangladesh
- Governing body: Ministry of Home Affairs
- General nature: Civilian police

Operational structure
- Headquarters: Dhaka, Bangladesh
- Minister responsible: Salahuddin Ahmed, Minister of Home Affairs
- Agency executive: Rezaul Karim, Addl. Inspector General
- Parent agency: Bangladesh Police

Facilities
- Battalions: 11
- Boats: Patrol Boats
- Helicopters: Bell 407

Website
- river.police.gov.bd
- Service uniform: Yankees Blue, Light French Beige Combat uniform: Navy Blue, Yankees Blue

River Police (Bengali: নৌ পুলিশ) is a specialized unit of Bangladesh Police responsible for policing internal river ways of Bangladesh. They are also responsible for policing fisherman and fishing in rivers. Additional Inspector General Kushum Dewan is the head of the River Police.

== History ==
River Police was established on 12 November 2013. It started out with 747 personnel under a Deputy Inspector General of Bangladesh Police. On 20 July 2010, the first camp of River Police was established in Dhaka at Mirpur. The government of Bangladesh had approved five River police camps within Dhaka city. In June 2019, River Police started operating in Rajshahi District.
