= Police Training Centre, Tangail =

Location
- Moherha, Tangail; Bangladesh

Information
- Type: Police Training
- Established: 1972

To impart the basic training of the fresh recruit constables of Bangladesh Police, the Police Training School (PTS), Tangail was established in 1972 on the trusted property of the then Zaminders at the village Moherha under the jurisdiction of Mirzapur Police Station in the district of Tangail. The institute was headed by an Assistant Superintendent of Police (ASP). This institute is situated on 28.07 acres (113,600 m^{2}) of land.

In 1990 the PTS was upgraded into Police Training Centre (PTC) further developing its standard. Now a Commandant (DIG Ranked Police Officer) commands this Police Training Centre.

== Courses offered ==
This centre mainly provides training to –

Sl. No	Rank of the Trainees	Duration
1	Sub-Inspector (Departmental)	6 months
2	Recruit Constable	6 months
