= Community Bank Bangladesh =

Community Bank Bangladesh PLC.
- Type: Public limited company
- Industry: Banking
- Founded: November 2019; 7 years ago in Dhaka, Bangladesh
- Headquarters: Dhaka, Bangladesh
- Key people: Md. Ali Hossain Fakir, IGP (Chairman); Mohammed Emtiaz Uddin, (Managing Director & CEO)
- Products: Banking services; Consumer banking; Corporate banking; Credit card
- Website: communitybankbd.com

Community Bank Bangladesh PLC. was established in November, 2019 as the 59th Scheduled Bank of Bangladesh. This bank is fully owned by Bangladesh Police Welfare Trust. Initially, the paidup capital was 400 crore taka with 2,00,000 police personnel as client.

== History ==
On 23 May 2018, Bangladesh Police Welfare Trust applied for a license from Bangladesh Bank to open a bank named Community Bank Bangladesh Limited. The trust is owned by Bangladesh Police. Bangladesh Bank approved the license application of the Bank in October 2018. The Bank was officially listed on 4 November 2018. Finance Minister of Bangladesh, Abul Maal Abdul Muhith, criticised Bangladesh Bank for approving Community Bank Bangladesh, Citizens Bank PLC, Bengal Commercial Bank Limited, and People's Bank Limited. He expressed unhappiness as he believed the banks were approved on political considerations.

Community Bank Bangladesh Limited started its operation on 11 September 2019, inaugurated by the Prime Minister of Bangladesh Sheikh Hasina.

In November 2021, Masihul Huq Chowdhury was reappointed the managing director of Community Bank Bangladesh Limited.

== See also ==
- Shimanto Bank Limited, managed by Border Guards Bangladesh
- Trust Bank Limited, managed by Bangladesh Army
- Ansar-VDP Unnayan Bank, managed by Bangladesh Ansar and the Village Defence Party
