= Malibagh =

Malibagh মালিবাগ
- Neighbourhood
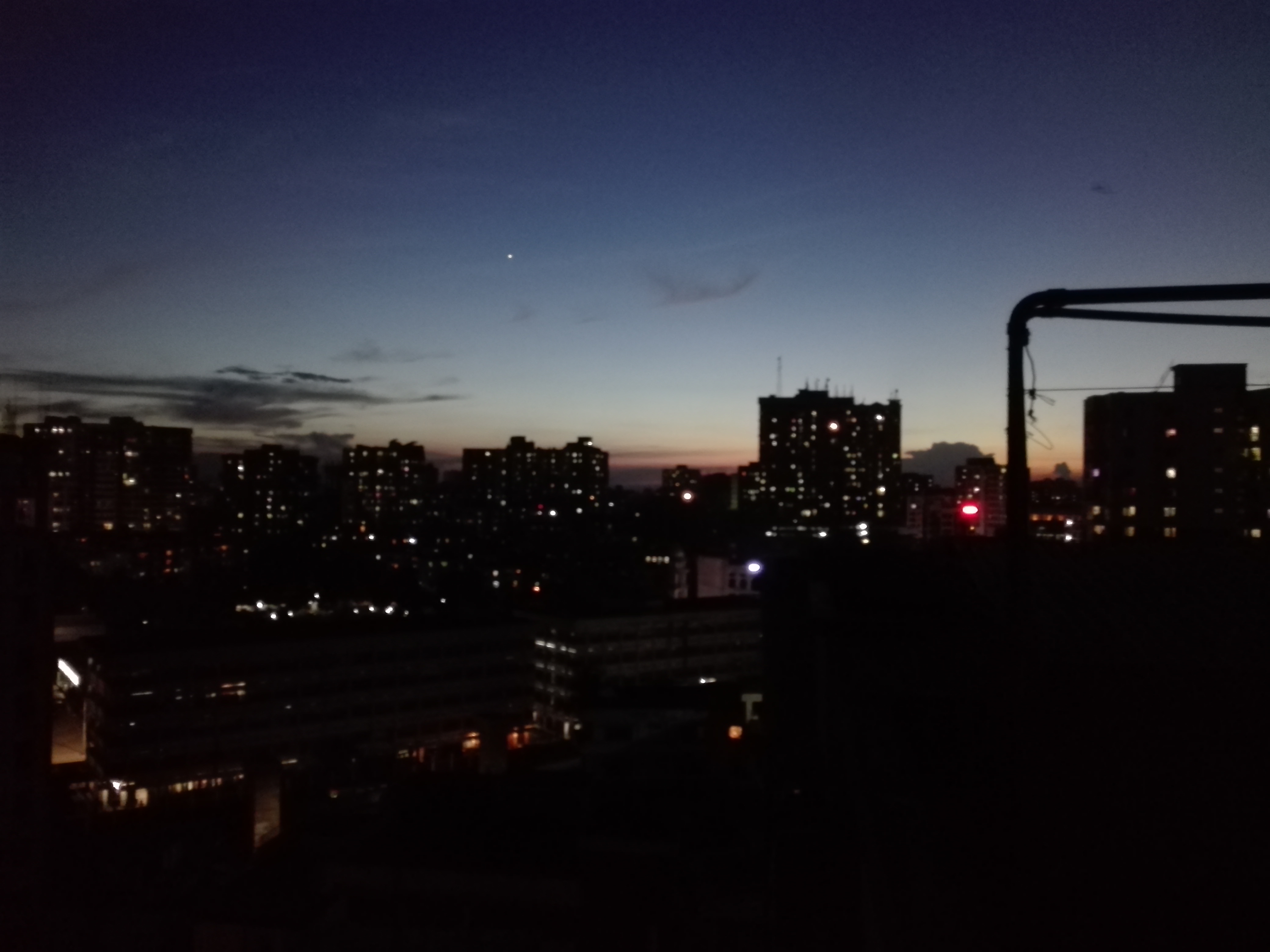
- Malibagh skyline at night
- Interactive map of Malibagh
- Coordinates: 23.7473°N 90.4143°E
- Country: Bangladesh
- City: Dhaka
- Municipality: Dhaka South City Corporation
- Ward: 12
- Time zone: UTC+6 (Bangladesh Standard Time)

Malibagh or Malibag (Bengali: মালিবাগ, romanized: Mālibāg, lit. 'gardeners' garden') is a neighbourhood in Dhaka, Bangladesh. One of the oldest and most populated neighbourhoods in Dhaka, the area falls under the precinct of Shahjahanpur Thana in Dhaka South City Corporation wards 12 and 19 and is encompassed by the Dhaka-8 constituency of Jatiya Sangsad.

== History ==
The name "Malibagh" is derived from the combination of two Bengali words: মালি, māli, meaning gardener, and বাগ, bāg, meaning garden. According to tradition, during the period of Muslim rule, Dhaka featured numerous gardens, with appointed gardeners responsible for their maintenance. These gardeners resided collectively, albeit not exclusively, in their own quarters. Over time, to distinguish their quarter from the other locality named Malitola in Old Dhaka, the gardeners of this area began referring to their neighborhood as Malibagh, a name that persists to this day. The current Abdul Aziz Lane in Malibagh is named after Abdul Aziz, who served as the municipal commissioner of Dhaka in 1921 and was a prominent social worker. The Malibagh area experienced rapid growth with settlements in the 1950s.
