= Police Staff College, Bangladesh =

Police Staff College
- Motto: Endeavour for Excellence
- Type: Police Training
- Established: 2000
- Rector: Kazi Fazlul Karim
- Location: Dhaka, Bangladesh
- Website: psc.gov.bd

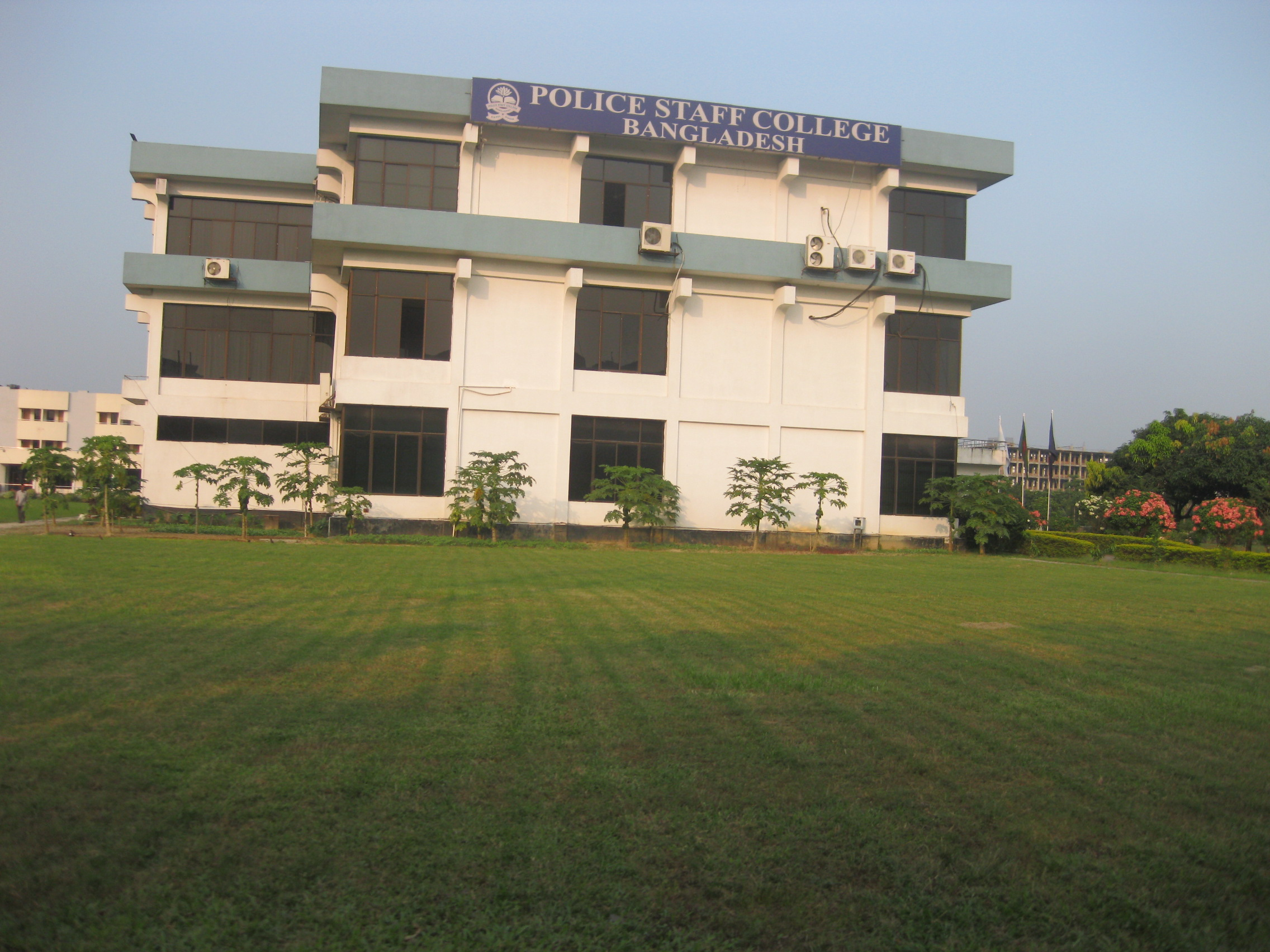
Main Building of Police Staff College

Police Staff College, the apex training institution for the senior Police officers of Bangladesh Police, was established in 2000 and becomes a statutory organization under Police Staff College Act, 2002. The college is a centre for research studies on police subjects and shares ideas and experiences with similar institutions in and outside the country.

== Location ==
The College stands on 19 acres (77,000 m^{2}) of land in the capital city Dhaka of Bangladesh at Mirpur Section-14 overlooking the residential areas of the Police Complex and the Public Order Management (POM) Division of the Dhaka Metropolitan Police.

== Background ==
The 1977 Police Commission 1977 recommended the establishment of a Staff College for professional training of senior police officers. The police Commission Report of 1988 to 1989, raised the issue of liberal education for senior Police officers and based on that a formal proposal was sent to the government in 1994. The government of Bangladesh approved the proposal on 14 December 1998. Police Staff College, Bangladesh was established on 30 November 2000.

== Activities ==
Civil servants, academics and professionals from various fields come to share their thoughts, experiences and ideas with the participants.

The college has a library with books, journals, periodicals and research reports for the benefit of participants, researchers and directing staffs of the college.

== Courses ==
Courses are offered to:

- ASP
- Sr. ASP
- Addl. SP
- SP
- Addl. DIG
- DIG
- Class-1 officers from Armed Forces, Special Security Force (SSF), National Security Intelligence (NSI) and from other sister organizations under Ministry of Home Affairs i.e. Correction officers, Border Guard Bangladesh (BGB) officers, Fire Service and Civil Defense officers, Department of Narcotics Control (DNC) officers etc.

== Management ==
A Rector of the rank of Additional Inspector General of Police heads the college. Two Directors equivalent to the rank of Superintendent of Police, three Additional Superintendent of Police, one Senior Assistant Superintendent of Police and one Assistant Superintendent of Police assist him. A Board of Governors headed by the Honorable Home Minister guides the College management.

=== Former rectors ===
Commandants and Rectors of PSC
No.	Name	Position	Joining Date	Departure Date	Reference
1	Md. Nurul Alam	Commandant	16 November 2000	26 November 2002	
Rector
2	Md. Nurul Alam	Rector	26 November 2002	5 February 2003	
3	Md. Masudul Huq	Rector	8 February 2003	30 March 2003	
4	Khondakar Mozammel Haque	Rector	31 March 2003	23 September 2003	
5	Nurul Alam Chowdhury	Rector	1 October 2003	4 February 2004	
6	Md. Abdus Salam	Rector	4 February 2004	31 August 2004	
7	Md. Ali Imam Chowdhury	Rector	21 September 2004	20 December 2004	
8	Md. Shahidullah Khan	Rector	9 February 2005	8 April 2005	
9	Md. Sadat Hosain	Rector	9 September 2005	27.09.2006	
10	N. B. K. Tripura	Rector	9 October 2006	1 November 2006	
11	Md. Samsuddoha Khondaker	Rector	7 November 2006	31 January 2007	
12	A.K.M. Mahfuzul Haque	Rector	4 February 2007	15 March 2009	
13	Naim Ahmed	Rector	15 March 2009	19 January 2012	
14	Md Nazmul Haque	Rector	19 January 2012	28 August 2014	
15	Fatema Begum	Rector	27 October 2014	13 May 2016	
16	M. Sadiqur Rahman	Rector	15 May 2016	27 August 2018	
17	Rowshan Ara Begum	Rector	7 November 2018	5 May 2019	
18	SK. Md. Maruf Hasan	Rector	21 May 2019	30 September 2020	
19	Md Nazibur Rahman	Rector	01 December 2020	9 October 2021	
20	Khandker Golam Faruq	Rector	20 February 2022	29 October 2022	
21	Mallick Faqrul Islam	Rector	19 February 2023	31 December 2024	
