= Sylhet Metropolitan Police =

Police unit in Bangladesh

Sylhet Metropolitan Police সিলেট মেট্রোপলিটন পুলিশ ꠡꠤꠟꠦꠐ ꠝꠦꠐ꠆ꠞꠧꠙꠟꠤꠐꠘ ꠙꠥꠟꠤꠡ
- Crest of Sylhet Metropolitan Police
- Common name: Metropolitan Police
- Abbreviation: SMP
- Motto: শান্তির লক্ষ্যে অবিচল

Agency overview
- Formed: 26 August 2009

Jurisdictional structure
- Operations jurisdiction: Sylhet, Bangladesh
- Area: 177.81 km^{2} (68.65 sq mi)
- Population: 532,426 (2022)
- Governing body: Ministry of Home Affairs
- Constituting instrument: The Sylhet Metropolitan Police Ordinance, 2009
- General nature: Local civilian police

Operational structure
- Headquarters: SMP Headquarter, Kumarpara Road, Sylhet
- Minister responsible: Salahuddin Ahmed, Minister of Home Affairs
- Agency executive: DIG Abdul Kuddus, Police Commissioner
- Parent agency: Bangladesh Police
- Special Units: Detective Branch; Crisis Response Team

Facilities
- Stations: 6
- Armored vehicles: Otokar Cobra, IAG Guardian, STREIT Typhoon
- Helicopters: Bell 407

Website
- smp.police.gov.bd
- Service uniform: Yankees Blue, Light French Beige Combat uniform: Oak Brown, Brown Derby

The Sylhet Metropolitan Police (Bengali: সিলেট মেট্রোপলিটন পুলিশ, romanized: Sileṭ mēṭrōpaliṭana puliśa; abbreviated as SMP) (Sylheti local word- Nagri Lipi - ꠡꠤꠟꠦꠐ ꠝꠦꠐ꠆ꠞꠧꠙꠟꠤꠐꠘ ꠙꠥꠟꠤꠡ) is the primary metropolitan unit of the Bangladesh Police, responsible for law enforcement, public safety, and crime prevention within the metropolis of Sylhet, a major city in northeastern Bangladesh. Established in 2009 under the Sylhet Metropolitan Police Ordinance, SMP oversees policing operations, administration, and coordination with other law enforcement and emergency agencies in the city. The force is headed by a Police Commissioner who manages all operational and administrative functions.

== History ==
Sylhet Metropolitan Police started operations on 26 October 2006 with only two police stations, Kotwali Police Station and Dakshin Surma Police Station.

Sylhet Metropolitan Police was regularized through the passage of the Sylhet Metropolitan Police Act, 2009. Plans were announced to expand the metropolitan police station through the addition of four police stations in April 2009. The commissioner, Syed Toufique Uddin Ahmed, was based in a small shed of Bangladesh Water Development Board and the police personnel were garrisoned in Sylhet Range Reserve Force due to lack of adequate accommodations.

A Sylhet court ordered the Sylhet Metropolitan Police to investigate five officers of the Detective Branch over the custodial death of Abdul Khalique in March 2013.

In September 2014, Quamrul Ahsan, the deputy inspector general of Railway Police Dhaka Range, was made the Sylhet Metropolitan Police Commissioner.

Sylhet Metropolitan Police suspended four police officers over the death of Rayhan Ahmed in custody at Bandarbazar Police Outpost following protests. His wife filed a case over the death on 11 October 2020 with Kotwali Police Station. Suspended sub-inspector Akbar Hossain Bhuiyan tried to flee to India but was detained by the Khasi people in Meghalaya and handed over to a Bangladeshi national at the border who returned him to Bangladesh Police custody. A video of his detention by Khasi people went viral on Bangladeshi social media. Five officers were charged in Sylhet Court on 18 April 2022 over the death of Rayhan Ahmed in custody. On 20 October 2020, Sylhet Metropolitan Police Commissioner Golam Kibria and 18 other police officers were transferred from Sylhet Metropolitan Police.

In November, jewelers attacked journalists and damaged an NTV camera during a raid by the Sylhet Metropolitan Police at a gold jewelry store in Haque Super Market after gold was stolen from journalist Ashraful Kabir's house in Sylhet. On 2 December 2022, three police constables of Sylhet Metropolitan Police were suspended after an investigation by the Sylhet Metropolitan Police found them involved in planting drugs on two students, including one whose father was a police Inspector, Abu Sayed.

== Stations ==
Sylhet Metropolitan Police has 6 police stations/thanas and they are:

1. Kotwali Model Thana, Sylhet
2. South Surma Thana
3. Moglabazar Thana
4. Jalalabad Thana
5. Bimanbandar Thana (Sylhet)
6. Shah Poran Thana

== See also ==
- Dhaka Metropolitan Police
- Chattogram Metropolitan Police
