= Armed Police Battalion =

Specialised unit of the Bangladesh Police

Armed Police Battalion আর্মড পুলিশ ব্যাটালিয়ন
- Insignia of Armed Police Battalion
- Abbreviation: APBn
- Motto: অপরাজেয় Unbeatable

Agency overview
- Formed: 1 October 1975; 51 years ago

Jurisdictional structure
- Operations jurisdiction: Bangladesh
- Area: 148,460 km^{2} (57,320 sq mi)
- Population: 162 million
- Governing body: Ministry of Home Affairs
- Constituting instruments: The Armed Police Battalion Ordinance, 1979; The Police Act, 1861
- General nature: Gendarmerie

Operational structure
- Headquarters: APBn Complex, Uttara, Dhaka
- Elected officer responsible: Salahuddin Ahmed, Minister of Home Affairs
- Agency executive: Hasib Aziz, Addl. Inspector General of Police
- Parent agency: Bangladesh Police

Facilities
- Battalions: 12 battalion
- Armored vehicles: Otokar Cobra, IAG Guardian, STREIT Typhoon
- Helicopters: Bell 407

Website
- apbn.police.gov.bd
- Service uniform: Yankees Blue, Light French Beige Combat uniform: Dolphin Gray, Pale Spring Bud, Indigo, Royal Brown

The Armed Police Battalion (APBn) is a specialised combat unit of the Bangladesh Police. It is headquartered in Dhaka. The unit has 11 battalions under its command and the Special Security and Protection Battalion has two battalions. Airport Armed Police Battalion is responsible for protecting the Hazrat Shahjalal International Airport.

== History ==
The Armed Police Battalion was formed on 1 October 1975 as a specialized force of the Bangladesh Police through The Armed Police Battalion Ordinance 1979. Rapid Action Battalion was created under the same ordinance in 2006 through the Armed Police Battalions (Amendment) Act, 2003. Armed Police Battalion-6 was established in 1976 in Barisal originally as a river battalion. Armed Police Battalion-4 was raised in 1979 in Bogura.

On 1 October 1981, the Armed Police Battalion-9 was established. It was moved to Khagrachar in 1987. It was moved to Barisal in 1989, Bilaichari in 1993, Khulna in 1996, Mohalchari in 2000, Uttara in 2003, and finally settled in Chittagong on 5 October 2009.

Armed Police Battalion-3 was established 17 July 2006 in Khulna.

In June 2010, Armed Police Battalion was deployed to Hazrat Shahjalal International Airport.

On 21 June 2011 Armed Police Battalion launched its first all women personal unit. On 26 December, Special Security and Protection Battalion was established to provide security to VIPs of the government and foreign diplomats.

Officers from the Armed Police Battalion have received training at the National Security Guard Centre in India as a part of a government plan in the aftermath of the July 2016 Dhaka attack to form a commando units in every police range and metropolitan area in Bangladesh.

In January 2019, sub-inspector of Armed Police Battalion-7 was arrested in Sylhet for operating a child prostitution ring with 12 year old girls.

The Bangladesh Police Swimming Complex was opened in November 2019. It was built at the Armed Police Battalion headquarters in Uttara, Dhaka, at a cost of 20 crore Bangladeshi taka (US$2.36 million in 2019).

=== Rohingya camps ===
In July 2020, Armed Police Battalion was tasked with providing security in Rohingya refugee camps in Cox's Bazar District and reduce crimes committed by the refugees. Two special battalions, Armed Police Battalion-14 and Armed Police Battalion-16, were created for the task with 1176 personnel. Armed Police Battalion-14 was established in 2016 and Armed Police Battalion-16 was established in 2019. The unit has faced accusations of violating human rights at the camp by the refugees and in a report by the Human Rights Watch. The accusations against the Armed Police Battalion included extortion and torture.

In January 2023, the government of Bangladesh announced plans to deploy Armed Police Battalion-18, Armed Police Battalion-19, and Armed Police Battalion-20 in Chittagong Hill Tracts in camps vacated by Bangladesh Army under the Chittagong Hill Tracts Peace Accord.

== Units ==
1. Armed Police Battalion-1 at Uttara.
2. Armed Police Battalion-2 at Muktagachha, Mymensingh
3. Armed Police Battalion-3 in Khulna
4. Armed Police Battalion-4 in Bogura
5. Armed Police Battalion-5 at Uttara
6. Armed Police Battalion-6 in Barisal
7. Armed Police Battalion-7 at Uttara
8. Armed Police Battalion-8 at Uttara
9. Armed Police Battalion-9 in Chittagong
10. Armed Police Battalion-10 at Mohalchhari in Khagrachhari
11. Armed Police Battalion-11 (women) at Uttara
12. Special Security and Protection Battalion-1 and 2, Uttara
