= Special Branch (Bangladesh) =

Prime intelligence agency of Bangladesh police

- স্পেশাল ব্রাঞ্চ
- Seal of Special Branch

Agency overview
- Formed: 16 December 1971; 54 years ago
- Type: Police intelligence
- Jurisdiction: Government of Bangladesh
- Headquarters: Malibagh, Dhaka; 23.7434°N 90.4146°E
- Employees: Classified
- Annual budget: Classified
- Agency executive: Addl. IGP Sardar Nurul Amin, Chief Executive
- Parent agency: Bangladesh Police
- Website: specialbranch.gov.bd

The Special Branch (Bengali: স্পেশাল ব্রাঞ্চ), commonly known by its acronym SB, is an intelligence agency of the Bangladesh Police and a key member of the Bangladesh Intelligence Community. The SB is responsible for collecting, analyzing, and disseminating intelligence related to internal security, political developments, extremist activities, and potential threats to public order. It monitors domestic and cross-border security issues, conducts surveillance operations, and provides intelligence support to the Government of Bangladesh, law enforcement agencies, and other members of the intelligence community to maintain national security.

== History ==
=== Formation of the intelligence wing during British rule ===
As the Congress movement was taking off, Dufferin became aware of the inadequacy of the system of collection of political intelligence and saw in the Indian National Congress, a threat to the stability of the empire, as there was no other political movement at that time raging in the country. In response to Dufferin's proposal, the Secretary of State for India issued an order on 22 December 1887 for setting up a Central Special Branch and also Special Branches of the Police Department at the headquarters of each provincial Government.

Following several review hearings and submission of reports, the competent authority approved the dismissal order. On 22 December 2023, the official termination notice was issued, bringing an end to his service in the Special Force.

In the beginning, the Central Special Branch did not have any unit solely under their control. They were merely collating and compiling their reports received from the provincial Special Branches. But in the far-flung areas of the Empire, there was need for collecting military intelligence.

In 1901, it was therefore, decided that the Central Special Branch which was responsible only for the collection of political intelligence should be expanded to include a small staff of selective detective agents, to be employed to monitor political movements as also to deal with those forms of organised crimes which extended beyond the limits of a single province.

=== Formation of district Intelligence Branch office ===
It gradually came to light that the ramification of the underground conspiratorial organisation were not confined to Calcutta alone but had spread to the districts, then the idea of forming Intelligence Branches at district headquarters was seriously considered. As early as in 1908, the Special Branch had set up some centres in places where the existence of underground organisations had come to light. Such centres were at Midnapore, Barishal, Deoghar, Kushtia, Khulna, Jessore. Each of the centres was in-charge of an Inspector who was detailed from Calcutta and remained stationed at the Centre till he was relieved by another. On the eve of the First World War, however, it was felt necessary that there should be a senior officer in-charge of the Intelligence Branch in the districts. In some of the affected districts, Additional Superintendents of Police were posted to head the district Intelligence Branches. Where there was no Additional Superintendent of Police, the Superintendent of Police was designated as Superintendent of Police in-charge of the District Intelligence Branch. The bigger districts like Midnapore, Dhaka, Chittagong etc. had one Additional Superintendent of Police in-charge of the District Intelligence Branch. The duty of the Intelligence Branch of the District Police was twofold:

- The collection of information regarding the ramification of the conspiracy organisation.
- Investigation of the specific offences committed in furtherance to the common object of the conspiracy.

The methodology of collection and dissemination of intelligence and the system of reporting from District Branch to higher-ups were gradually evolved and codified over the years. It, however, goes without saying that the Intelligence Branch in Bengal showed exceptional ability in dealing with the terrorist violence during the period before Independence. Its excellent source work and innumerable channels of information eventually resulted in unearthing of all the groups responsible for terrorist violence.

== Organisation of Special Branch ==
Golam Rasul, Additional Inspector General of Bangladesh Police, is the current head of Special Branch. The headquarters is a 14-storied building located at Malibagh, Rajarbagh, Dhaka, is known as KPI (Key Point Installation). The most important wing of the force charged with security planning as well as functions of intelligence-gathering and counterintelligence. There is City Special Branch (City SB) for the city areas and District Special Branch (DSB) for the districts. Major responsibilities of this branch are to meet up any intelligence required from government, registration and control of foreigners, perform verification role, give protection to the VVIPs & VIPs, intelligence gathering, immigration control etc.

== Training ==
Officer training is the responsibility of the Special Branch Training School. It was established in September 1992 in Uttara, Dhaka. It relocated in June 2002 to Malibagh, and again in December 2008 to Rajarbagh Police Lines of Dhaka Metropolitan Police. Finally, SB build a permanent training school in uttara with accommodation and advance training facilities. The school trains officers in courses on intelligence-gathering, surveillance, immigration control, and VVIP protection.
