= Bangladesh Police =

Law enforcement agency

Bangladesh Police বাংলাদেশ পুলিশ
- Patch of Bangladesh Police

- Emblem of Bangladesh Police

- Flag of Bangladesh Police
- Abbreviation: BP
- Motto: শান্তি শৃঙ্খলা নিরাপত্তা প্রগতি En: Discipline Security Progress

Agency overview
- Formed: December 16, 1971; 54 years ago
- Employees: 220,000 personnel
- Annual budget: ৳18793 crore (US$1.5 billion)

Jurisdictional structure
- National agency: Bangladesh
- Operations jurisdiction: Bangladesh
- Area: 148,460 km^{2} (57,320 sq mi)
- Population: 175 million
- Governing body: Government of Bangladesh
- Constituting instrument: The Police Act, 1861
- General nature: Civilian police

Operational structure
- Headquarters: 6, Phoenix Road, Fulbaria, Dhaka 1000
- Minister responsible: Salahuddin Ahmed, Minister for Home Affairs
- Agency executive: Md. Ali Hossain Fakir, Inspector General of Police
- Parent agency: Ministry of Home Affairs
- Specialized Formations: SRB; PBI; CID; APBn; AAP; TPB; RPB; IPB; GRP; HPB; SB; SPBn; DB; SWAT; CTTC
- Metropolitan Commissionerates: DMP; CMP; GMP; KMP; RMP; SMP; BMP; RPMP

Facilities
- Stations: 651
- Armored vehicles: Otokar Cobra, IAG Guardian, STREIT Typhoon, INKAS Sentry, IAG Rhino, CenTech Blue Shield, BATT-X
- Helicopters: Bell 407

Website
- www.police.gov.bd

The Bangladesh Police (Bengali: বাংলাদেশ পুলিশ, romanized: Baṅladeś Puliś) is the national law enforcement service of Bangladesh, operating under the Ministry of Home Affairs. It is responsible for maintaining peace, enforcing law and order, and ensuring the safety and security of citizens across the country. While primarily concerned with law enforcement and protection of individuals and property, the Bangladesh Police also play a significant role in the criminal justice system. Established before the 1971 Liberation War, the force contributed actively during the war and has since evolved into the country's principal policing institution. The Bangladesh Police also participate in United Nations peacekeeping missions, providing personnel for international law enforcement and security operations.

== History ==
=== Medieval period ===
Details of policing activities, during the middle age are challenging to find. However, during the periods of the Bengal Sultanate, an official holding the position of Muhtasib used to perform the duties of policing. This person was the chief of police, in charge of public works, and the inspector of public ethics simultaneously. In urban areas, Kotwals were responsible for performing police duties. The policing system introduced by Sher Shah Suri was further organised during the period of Emperor Akbar: the Emperor organised his administrative structure introducing Fouzdari (the principal representative of the Emperor), Mir Adal and Kazi (the head of judicial department), and Kotwal (the chief police official of larger cities). This system was effective in maintaining the law and order in cities, and was implemented in Dhaka. Many district sadar police stations are still called Kotwali police stations. In the Mughal period, Kotwal emerged as an institution.

A Fouzdar was appointed to every administrative unit of the government (district), under whom there were some artillery and cavalry forces. There was a disciplined police system during the Mughal period, though there was no professional police force like that in the British period.

=== British period (1857–1947) ===
In the early stage of the Industrial Revolution, when England was facing grave crisis due to socio-economic transformation, the necessity of an effective organised police service was keenly felt. Sir Robert Peel, then the Prime Minister, introduced a bill in the British Parliament in 1829 that created an organised civil police in London. The success of the London police in controlling social disorder and crime was admired by not only the people of England but also of European and American countries: New York city copied the London model with some modifications when it organised the first Municipal Police Force, in 1833.

In 1858, full control of the Indian Territory was taken over from the East India Company by the British government. The success of the London Police organised under Peel's Metropolitan Police Act 1829 prompted the British government to reform the police system in the sub-continent in a similar way to British constabularies. With this end in view, a police commissioner was set up in 1861, and on the recommendation of the commission of the Police Act, 1861 (Act V of 1861), was passed. Under this act, a police force was created in each province of British India, and placed under the control of the provincial government. The administration of the police force of a province was vested upon an officer styled as the Inspector-general of police. The administration of the police in a district was placed under the Superintendent of Police. The Act is still in force throughout the sub-continent, and regulates the function of police in Bangladesh, as well as the other countries of the sub-continent.

=== Pakistan period (1947–1970) ===
After the partition of the sub-continent in 1947, the police force in Bangladesh was first named as the East Bengal Police, and then as the East Pakistan Police; however, it continued to function on the same lines as during the British rule. The police could many times be used to suppress protest or movements like the Nachole uprising, Bengali language movement, 1962 East Pakistan Education movement and 1969 East Pakistan mass uprising.

==== Role in Liberation War ====
In the Bangladesh Liberation War, Bengali-speaking police officers participated with the citizens, leading to deaths from most ranks, fighting with .303 rifles against the Pakistani Army. The resistance by the Bengali members of police at Rajarbagh and in Kushtia is considered the first chapter of armed struggles during the Bangladesh Liberation War. Bangladesh Police founded a Liberation War Museum at the Rajarbagh police line in January 2017.

=== Bangladesh (1971–present) ===
After the emergence of Bangladesh as an independent country on 16 December 1971, the police force was recognised and assumed the role of a national police force. In January 2004, the Bangladesh Nationalist Party led government removed the boat from the police as it resembled the former ruling party, Awami League's election symbol. The boat symbol was brought back during the Premiership of Sheikh Hasina.

However, following the July Uprising, on 22 April 2025, the police logo and symbol was changed through a gazette published by the Interim government. The gazette of the new dress code was published on the same day. The new logo, resembles the National emblem of Bangladesh.

== Organization ==
Bangladesh Police is headed by the Inspector General of Police (IGP), under whose command, Bangladesh Police is divided into several formations.

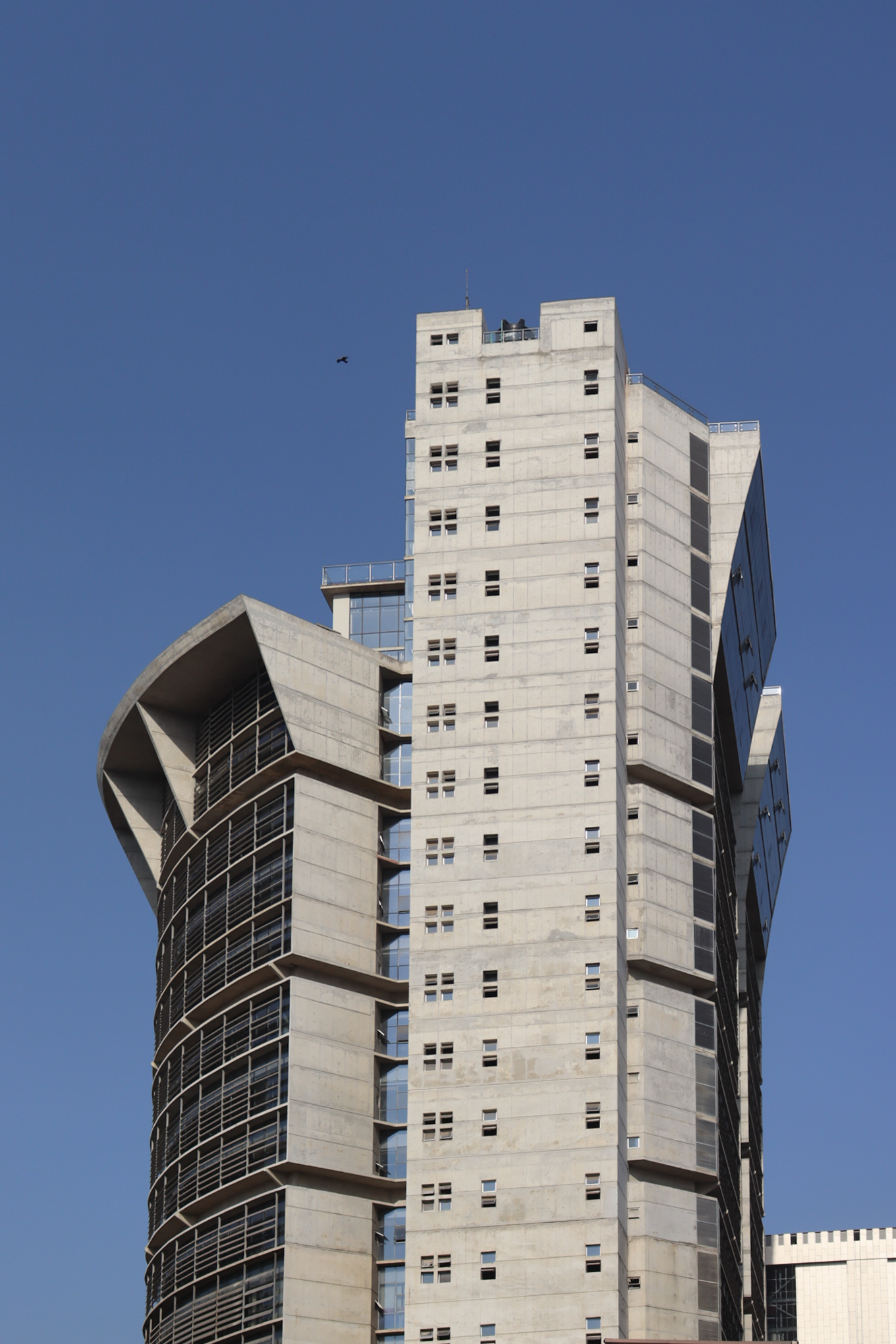
Bangladesh Police headquarters building

=== Formations ===
Subnational Formations

- Range Police
- Metropolitan Police Commissionerates

Specialized Divisions

- Traffic Police
- Airport Armed Police (AAP)
- Diplomatic Security Division
- Tourist Police
- Highway Police
- Industrial Police (IP)
- Public Order Management Division
- Immigration Police (Bangladesh)
- River Police
- Railway Police (RP)
- Police Air Wing
- Mountain Police
- Mass Rapid Transit (MRT) Police Force

Specialized Battalion Forces

- Special Security and Protection Battalion (SPBn)
- Special Armed Force (SAF)
- Range Reserve Force (RRF)
- Special Response Battalion (SRB)
- Armed Police Battalion (APBn)

Specialized Units

- Special Weapons And Tactics (SWAT)
- Special Women Police Contingent
- Cyber Police Unit
- Crisis Response Team (CRT)
- Anti-Terrorism Unit (ATU)
- Bomb Disposal Unit (BDU)
- Canine Unit (CU)

=== Institutes ===
- Police Headquarters (PHQ)
- Police Staff College, Bangladesh (PSC)
- Bangladesh Police Academy, Sarda (BPA)
- Police Training Centers (PTCs)
- Specialized Training Center like DTS/TDS/FTC/SBTS/IPTC/ITTS/Telecom TS/MDTS/PSTS etc.

=== Intelligence Agencies ===
- Special Branch (SB)
- Detective Branch (DB)
- Counter Terrorism and Transnational Crime (CTTC)
- Counter Terrorism and Transnational Intillegence (CTTI)
- Police Internal Oversight (PIO)
- Intillegence & Analysis Division
- CT-Cyber Crime Investigation
- Telecommunication and Information Management (T&IM)

=== Investigation Directorates General ===
- Criminal Investigation Department (CID)
- Police Bureau of Investigation (PBI)
- Crime Division
- Serious Crime Investigation
- Women Support & Investigation Division
- Professional Standard & Internal Investigation Division

== Ranks and insignia ==
=== Superior officers (First-Class General Cadre Officers) ===
Rank group	General / flag officers			Senior officers			Junior officers
Bangladesh Police
Bangladesh Police	Inspector general of police	Additional inspector general of police	Deputy inspector general of police	Additional deputy inspector general of police	Superintendent of police (Note: Assistant inspector general of police (AIGP) if in police HQ. Special superintendent of police (SSP) if in special branch or Criminal Investigation Department. Superintendent of railway police if in railway police.)	Additional superintendent of police	Senior assistant superintendent of police	Assistant superintendent of police
Metropolitan Branch		Commissioner of police (Note: In Dhaka Metropolitan Police)	Commissioner of police Additional police commissioner	Additional Police Commissioner; Joint commissioner of police (Note: Only in Dhaka Metropolitan Police)	Deputy commissioner of police	Additional deputy commissioner of police	Assistant commissioner of police
Industrial Police			Director general	Additional director general	Director	Deputy director	Senior assistant director	Assistant director
Grade	Supernumerary	1	2	3	4	5	6 & 7	9 (8)

Additional Inspector Generals of Police (Addl. IGs) serve directly under the Inspector General of Police (IGP). There were 11 Addl. IGs on the force as of 2009.

As of 2025, Addl. IGs command Special Branch, the CID, one unit of the Metropolitan Police, the Railway Police, the Highway Police, the Police Bureau of Investigation, the Anti Terrorism Unit, the Tourist Police, the Rapid Action Battalion, the Armed Police Battalion, the River Police, the Industrial Police, and two training units.

=== Subordinate officers ===
Rank group	First-Class Gazetted Officers	Subordinate Officers				Enlisted
Bangladesh Police
Bangladesh Police	Inspector of police	Sub-inspector of police	Police sergeant	Assistant sub-inspector of police	Police nayek	Constable
Armed Branch	Armed inspector of police	Armed sub-inspector		Armed assistant sub-inspector	Armed police nayek	Armed police constable
Industrial Police	Deputy assistant director	Circle commander		Assistant sub-inspector	Nayek	Constable
Traffic Division	Traffic inspector	Town sub-inspector	Police sergeant	Assistant town sub-inspector		Traffic constable
Grade	8 & 9	9 & 10		11	13 & 14	16

=== Medals ===
Police medals are awarded every year in the annual Police Week Parade. They are awarded both for bravery and service.

Bangladesh Police Medal (BPM)

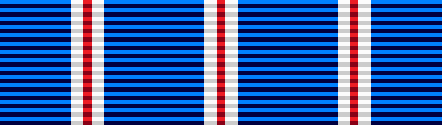
- Bangladesh Police Medal (Bravery)
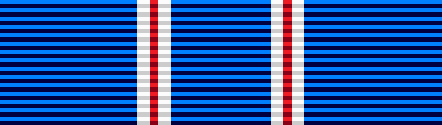
- Bangladesh Police Medal (Service)
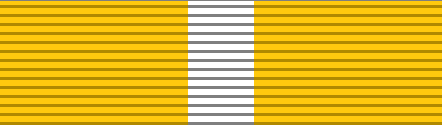
- President Police Medal (Bravery)
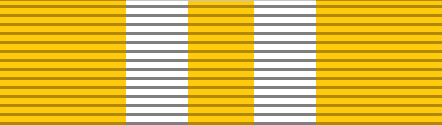
- President Police Medal (Service)

== Selection and training ==
The recruitment process differs according to the level of position being recruited to, and direct entry (where an applicant does not have to start at the lowest level) is possible. The educational requirements increase with rank. A minimum bachelor's degree is required for Assistant Superintendent of Police, Sub-Inspector, and Sergeant, and for Constable, a Secondary School Certificate is required. Recruitment is conducted in the following three tiers:

- In the rank of Assistant Superintendent of Police (ASP)
- In the rank of Sub-Inspector (SI) or Sergeant
- In the rank of Constable

=== Assistant Superintendent of Police (ASP) ===
The Assistant Superintendent of Police (ASP) are recruited by the Bangladesh Public Service Commission (BPSC) through the competitive Bangladesh Civil Service the Bangladesh Police Academy as Probationary ASPs. After passing from the academy, they undergo an orientation training for six months in the district level as a probationer. After that they are appointed as full-fledged Senior ASPs in different units as of 2026. Previously they were appointed as ASPs only.

=== Sub-Inspector (SI) ===
Sub-Inspectors are recruited by Police Headquarters centrally. They undergo a one-year-long training in the Bangladesh Police Academy as Outside Cadet Sub-Inspectors. After that they have partake in two years probationary period in different police units. After that they have been appointed as a full-fledged SIs in different units.

=== Sergeant ===
Sergeants are recruited by Police Headquarters centrally. After appointment they undergo a one-year-long training course in the Bangladesh Police Academy, at the rank of Probationary Sergeant. After passing from the academy, they also undergo an orientation training of one year in the rank of probationer.

=== Constable ===
Constables are recruited at the district level. They undergo a six-month-long training in the Police Training Centre as a Trainee Recruit Constable career (TRC).

=== Training institutions ===
The main training institution of the Bangladesh Police is the Bangladesh Police Academy, established in 1912 in Sardah. The Police Staff College, which trains officers from ASP to DIG in-service, was established in 2000 in Dhaka. Bangladesh Police also maintains Police Training Centre (PTC) in Tangail, Rangpur, Khulna and Noakhali. The Detective Training School was established in 1962 in Dhaka.

==== List of training institutions ====
- Police Staff College, Dhaka
- Bangladesh Police Academy, Sardah, Rajshahi
- Police Training Centre, Tangail
- Police Training Centre, Rangpur
- Police Training Centre, Khulna
- Police Training Centre, Noakhali
- Detective Training School (DTS), Rajarbagh, Dhaka
- Forensic Training Institute, Malibagh, Dhaka
- Special Branch Training School, Malibagh, Dhaka
- Police Peacekeepers' Training School, Rajarbagh, Dhaka
- Police Special Training School (PSTS), Betbunia, Rangamati
- Traffic and Driving School (TDS), Mill Barrack, Dhaka
- Motor Driver Training School (MDTS), Jamalpur
- Telecommunications Training School, T&IM, Rajarbagh, Dhaka
- Armed Police Battalion and specialised training centre, Khagrachari
- Rapid Action Battalion Forces Training School, Gazipur
- Armed Police Battalion School & College, Uttara, Dhaka

Moreover, there are in-service training centres in different districts.

- Rajarbag Police Lines School & College, Rajarbag, Dhaka

== Community policing ==
In Bangladesh police, community policing is an organisation with the aims of promoting community, government and police partnerships, proactive problem solving, and community engagement to address the causes of crime, fear of crime and community issues. Bangladesh Police have been trying to implement this philosophy nationwide. The Police Reform Program (PRP), a UNDP funded project, has been providing Bangladesh Police with technical assistance to implement community-policing nationwide.

=== Strategic partnership ===
Under the strategic partnership there are:

1. A National Community Policing Advisory Committee, chaired by the Secretary of the Ministry of Home Affairs.
2. A National Community Policing Co-ordination Committee headed by the IGP or an additional Inspector General of Police at the Police Headquarters.
3. A Crime Prevention Centre, set up in the police Headquarters having the Detective Inspector General (Crime) at the focal point.

=== Implementation partnership ===
The implementation partnership starts at the district level: There is a district community-policing cell in every district under the Superintendent of Police. The Additional SP or an ASP looks after the district community-policing cell. Secondly, in the police station level, there is a community policing cell with a full-time community policing officer (CPO), who coordinates the community policing activities in the police station jurisdiction.

=== Beat policing ===
In 2016 Dhaka Metropolitan Police under DMP Commissioner Asaduzzaman Mia implemented beat policing in Dhaka city. In this regard, each Police Station is divided into some police beats, and for each beat there is an assigned Beat Policing Officer for a tenure of 2 years.

== UN peace-keeping operations ==
Since its first mission in Namibia in 1989, the Bangladesh Police has contributed to numerous UN peace-keeping missions.

List of completed and present UNPOL and FPU Peacekeeping missions participated by Bangladesh Police:

Sl. No	Name of mission	Country	Period
1	UNTAG	Namibia	1989–1990
2	UNTAC	Cambodia	1992–1994
3	UNPROFOR	Yugoslavia	1992–1996
4	ONUMOZ	Mozambique	1993–1994
5	UNAMIR	Rwanda	1993–1995
6	UNMIH	Haiti	1994–1995
7	UNAVEM III	Angola	1995–1999
8	UNTAES	East Slovenia	1996–1998
9	UNMIBH	Bosnia	1996–2002
10	UNAMET & UNTAET	East Timor	1999–2002
11	UNMIK	Kosovo	1999–2009
12	UNAMSIL	Sierra Leone	2000
13	UNMIL	Liberia	2003–2018
14	UNOCI	Ivory Coast	2004–2017
15	UNMIS	Sudan	2005–2011
16	MONUSCO	DR Congo	2005–present
17	UNMIT	East Timor	2006–2012
18	UNAMID	Darfur	2007–2020
19	UNAMA	Afghanistan	2008–2010
20	UNMISS	South Sudan	2011–present
21	MINUSTAH	Haiti	2004–2017

== Corruption and controversies ==
Bangladesh Police has been criticized for having political influence at all levels, and the major decisions are taken under political conditions. Corruption is widespread among the law enforcement, with custody deaths and torture being prevalent.

In 2016 January, a Dhaka South City Corporation official was tortured by Dhaka Metropolitan Police members. In the same month a sub-inspector at DMP was accused of torturing and attempting to extort money from a Bangladesh Bank official. Bangladesh Police have been accused of being involved in crime including rape and murder. Bangladesh's opposition parties have accused the police of being used to suppress the opposition parities. The accountability of the police has been questioned by the media. 230 Police officers in Barisal Metropolitan Police created a collective bribe fund for promotions. Bangladesh Police faced criticism for advising secular bloggers to practice self-censorship following attacks on secularists in the country. Bonya Ahmed, wife of Avijit Roy had accused Bangladesh Police of Inactivity during the attack on her husband. Government of the United Kingdom has faced criticism for its aid to Bangladesh Police which could be used to suppress dissidents.

Mohammad Harun-Ur-Rashid, Superintendent of Police and head of the Dhaka Metropolitan Police (DMP) Tejgaon division, has been at the center of several controversies. On 3 November 2019, he kidnapped the wife and minor son of Showkat Aziz Russell, Chairperson of Amber group, for extortion from Gulshan and shifted them to Narayanganj. He was removed from his post in Narayanganj after the incident came to light. He continued working at the post four days after his transfer came through. The Business Standard, a Bangladeshi newspaper, described him as a "case of police impunity". He made the news first on 6 July 2011 for assaulting Zainul Abdin Farroque, Bangladesh Nationalist Party politician, opposition whip, and member of parliament. He was awarded and promoted for the assault on Zainul. In November 2019, a video of him went viral, where he and other police officers were seen attacking a referee in a friendly football match.

On 16 July 2024, between 2:30 and 3:00 pm, quota reform protesters and police clashed in front of Begum Rokeya University. Police fired tear gas and baton-charged to disperse students. Most of the students left while Abu Sayed remained. The police were firing rubber bullets from the opposite direction. Sayed was subsequently shot four times by a police officer. He died before being taken to hospital.

On 12 June 2026, Bangladesh national cricketer Nayeem Hasan was assaulted by police officers in Chattogram after being stopped while returning home from Shah Amanat International Airport. He was subsequently taken to Khulshi Police Station, where he was further harassed. The incident sparked widespread public attention, prompted the filing of a criminal case against the officers involved, including a sub-inspector, and led to the withdrawal of three personnel from duty pending an investigation.
