= Saiful Islam (police officer) =

Bangladeshi police officer

Md. Saiful Islam
- মোঃ সাইফুল ইসলাম

32nd Police Commissioner of Chattogram Metropolitan Police
- In office 3 July 2024 – 21 August 2024
- Appointed by: Minister of Home Affairs
- Preceded by: Krishna Pada Roy
- Succeeded by: Hasib Aziz

Personal details
- Born: Pabna
- Education: Bangladesh University of Engineering and Technology
- Police career
- Allegiance: Bangladesh
- Branch: Bangladesh Police
- Service years: 2001-2026
- Status: Retired
- Rank: DIG

Md. Saiful Islam is a retired Bangladeshi police officer who rose to deputy inspector general of police. He was the commissioner of the Chittagong Metropolitan Police for seven weeks, including the latter half of the 2024 July Uprising.

In his 33-year police career, he held various posts, including superintendent of police in Barisal District from 2017 to 2020. Later he was the commissioner of the Barisal Metropolitan Police. He was also deputy inspector general of the MRT Police.

In February 2025, Islam was arrested for the July 2024 murder of a student in protests against Prime Minister Sheikh Hasina. As of June 2025, he is in prison awaiting trial.

== Biography ==
Islam was born in Pabna. He earned a master's degree at Bangladesh University of Engineering and Technology in 1995.

Islam joined the Bangladesh Police in 2001 as part of the 20th batch of the Bangladesh Civil Service. From 30 April 2012 to 13 September 2014, he was the deputy commissioner (port division) in the Chittagong Metropolitan Police (CMP).

He was superintendent of police in Barguna District and, from August 2017 to December 2020, in Barisal District. In 2026, the daily newspaper Jugantor published allegations that while there, he suppressed opposition to the ruling Awami League. He allegedly manipulated the 2018 general election through "night voting", a euphemism for stuffing ballot boxes the night before the election.

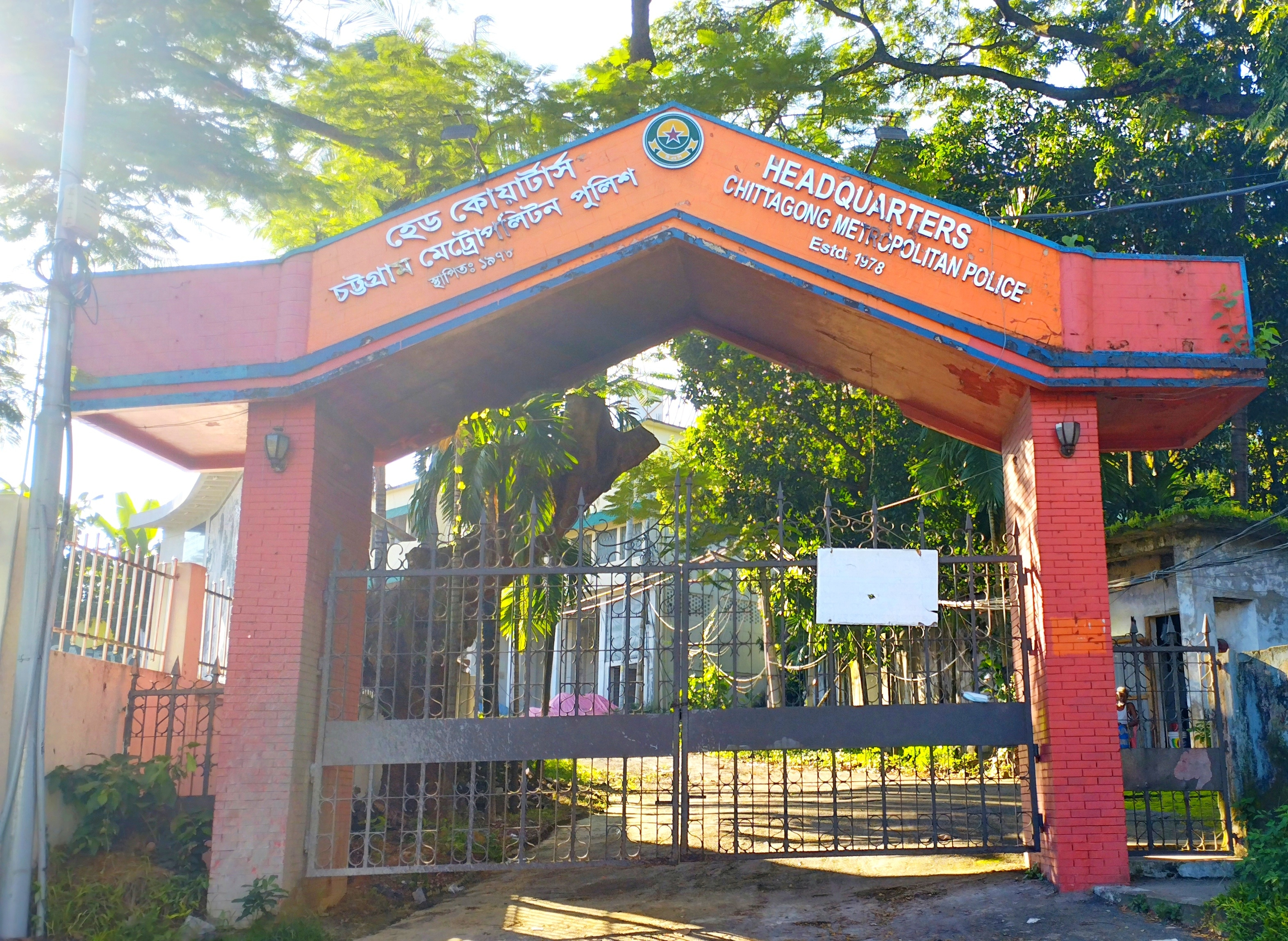
Chittagong Metropolitan Police HQ, Islam's address in July 2024

Islam was also an additional deputy inspector general of Chittagong Range. He was the commissioner of the Barisal Metropolitan Police until December 2023. Shortly before the 2024 general election, he was replaced by Jehadul Kabir. His replacement came on the orders of the Bangladesh Election Commission in the interest of ensuring "fairness and neutrality". Islam was transferred to Kabir's former post, deputy inspector general of the MRT Police (Mass Rapid Transit Police), formed to guard the Dhaka Metro Rail.

On 23 June 2024, he was appointed the commissioner of the CMP and joined the unit on 4 July. He replaced Krishna Pada Roy.

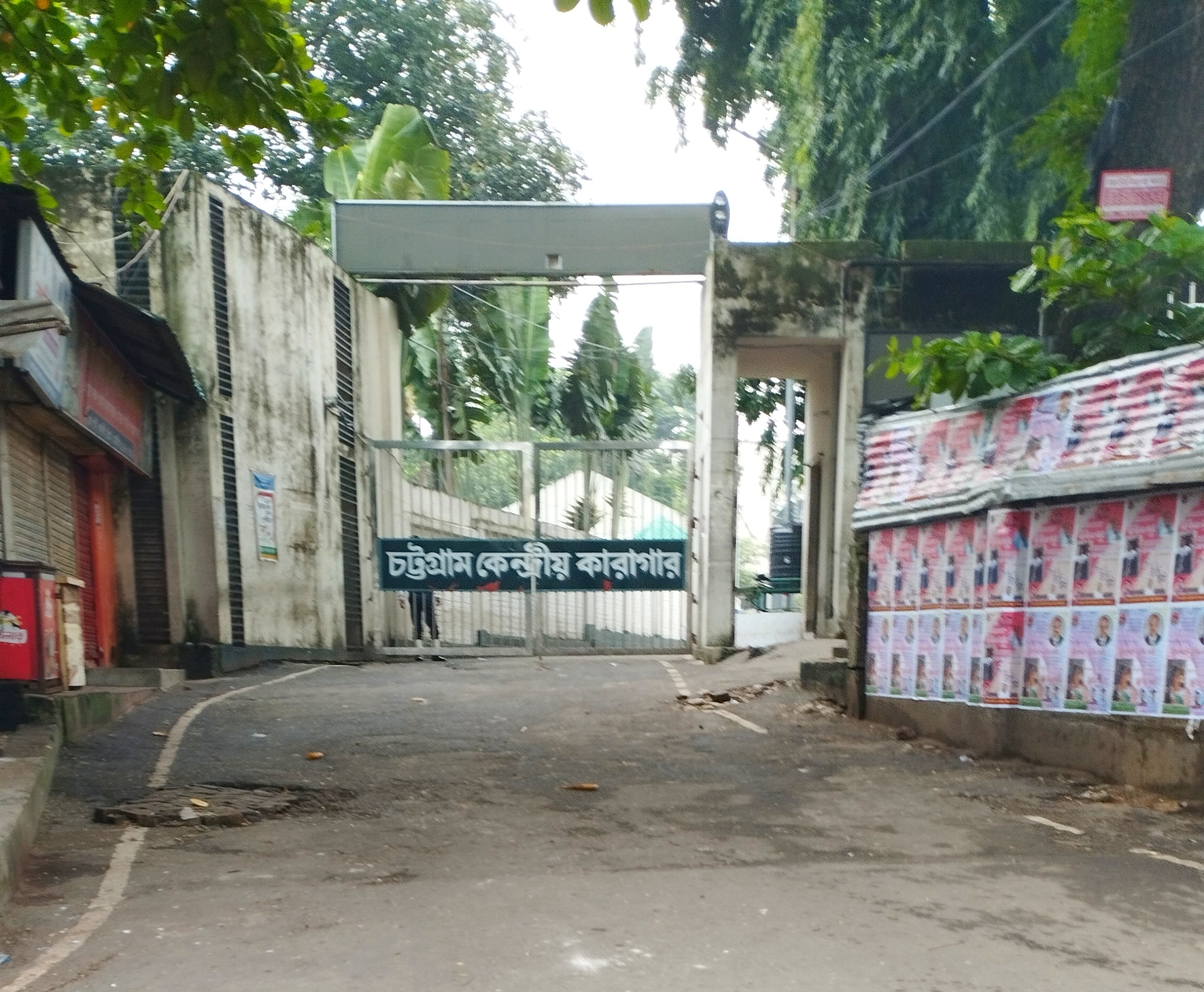
Chittagong Central Jail, Islam's address in June 2025

After the fall of the Sheikh Hasina-led Awami League government, Islam was transferred out of the CMP to the Bangladesh Police Academy in Sardah, Rajshahi District. This was part of a change in all senior-level positions in the Bangladesh Police following the fall of the Awami League government.

In February 2025, Islam was arrested for the July 2024 murder of Hridoy Chandra Tarua, a protestor against Hasina. Islam was also suspended from duty. As of June 2025, he was being held in Chittagong Central Jail with divisional status. In July 2026, he was compulsorily retired from the police.
