= Molla Nazrul Islam =

4th Police Commissioner of Gazipur Metropolitan Police
- In office 13 July 2022 – 1 June 2023
- Preceded by: Khandker Lutful Kabir
- Succeeded by: Md Mahbub Alam
- Police career
- Allegiance: Bangladesh
- Branch: Bangladesh Police
- Service years: 2001–2024
- Rank: DIG

Molla Nazrul Islam is a Bangladeshi police officer and deputy inspector general of Armed Police Battalion headquarters. He is the former commissioner of Gazipur Metropolitan Police, responsible for Gazipur. He is a former special superintendent of the Criminal Investigation Department.

== Career ==
Islam joined the Bangladesh police through the 20th batch of Bangladesh Civil Service in 2001.

In 2013, two police officers were closed for detaining and extorting 10 million BDT from a businessman from Narail District. They were closed after Narail-1 member of parliament Kabirul Haque Mukti wrote a complaint to the Ministry of Home Affairs that stated the policemen did so on the orders of Islam, then deputy police commissioner of Detective Branch North. Islam claimed he stopped the associates of the lawmaker from assaulting a "minority" person in 2010, and this was retaliation. Islam was transferred to the Protection and Protocol Division of the Dhaka Metropolitan Police.

Islam was the superintendent of police of Joypurhat District in 2015. He was the deputy commissioner of Barisal Metropolitan Police.

In 2017, Islam, then a special superintendent of organized crime of the Criminal Investigation Department, detained a terror financier. He detained non-profit staff members linked to Bangladesh Jamaat-e-Islami on charges of money laundering. He also launched an investigation into how Bangladeshi companies were paying social media companies. He detained individuals, some with links with Bangladesh Open University, who forged tests for admission to the University of Dhaka. He contributed to the investigation of the Bangladesh Bank robbery. He detained Asif Akbar on piracy charges filed by Shafiq Tuhin in 2018. He also investigated the murder of Nusrat Jahan Rafi.

Islam arrested a group of scammers operating under the Max Vision Group of Companies Ltd name. He detained Shamim Kabir, chairperson of Fareast Islami Multi Cooperative Society Limited, on a three billion BDT default case; money he had collected from 20 thousand small investors. He detained the managing director of S. A. Group, Shahabuddin Alam, on loan default charges of Bank Asia. He detained Aziz, the Co-operative Commerce and Finance Credit Society chairperson, for embezzling three billion BDT in funds from members of the society.

Islam was promoted to additional deputy inspector general of police in August 2019.

In July 2022, Islam was appointed commissioner of Gazipur Metropolitan Police after he was promoted to deputy inspector general of police. In February 2023, a trader died in the custody of Gazipur Metropolitan Police, which Islam initially denied but later admitted. He detained actress Mahiya Mahi under the Digital Security Act, 2018, after she criticized Gazipur Metropolitan Police and Commissioner Islam online. Sub-inspector Rokon Mia filed two cases against Mahiya Mahi and her husband. Asaduzzaman Khan Kamal, minister of home affairs, defended the police action against Mahiya Mahi. She secured bail on 19 March 2023. He deployed 13 thousand police personnel for the Gazipur City Corporation election in 2023.

On 1 June 2023, Md Mahbub Alam replaced Islam as commissioner of Gazipur Metropolitan Police. Following the fall of the Sheikh Hasina-led Awami League government, he was appointed to the Bangladesh Police Academy and detained in February 2025. In July 2026, he was sent into forced retirement along with other police officers who served as District Superintendent of Police during the 2018 Bangladesh general election.
