= Nazmul Karim Khan =

Bangladeshi police officer

- নাজমুল করিম খান

6th Police Commissioner of Gazipur Metropolitan Police
- In office 27 August 2024 – December 2025
- Appointed by: Ministry of Home Affairs
- Preceded by: Khandkar Rafiqul Islam
- Police career
- Allegiance: Bangladesh
- Branch: Bangladesh Police
- Service years: 1995-present
- Status: Active
- Rank: Deputy Inspector General

Nazmul Karim Khan is a Bangladeshi police officer and commissioner of the Gazipur Metropolitan Police. He was sent into forced retirement by the Awami League regime in 2023 and reinstated after the fall of the regime. He led the investigation into the Murder of Sohagi Jahan Tonu.

== Early life ==
Khan was the vice-president of the Bangladesh Jatiotabadi Chatradal, the student wing of the Bangladesh Nationalist Party, unit at the Bangladesh Agricultural University. He has a PhD from Japan.

== Career ==
Khan joined the Bangladesh Police in 1995 as part of the 15th batch of the Bangladesh Civil Service.

In February 2007, Khan was the superintendent of police of Khulna District. He was transferred out and made deputy commissioner of the Rajshahi Metropolitan Police. He had previously served as the deputy commissioner of the Chittagong Metropolitan Police. He had a good relationship with the Bangladesh Nationalist Party government and enjoyed good postings as a result.

Khan was appointed special superintendent of the Criminal Investigation Department in Dhaka in 2015. He had previously been stationed at the Khulna Range Reserve Force.

Khan led the 2016 investigation into the Murder of Sohagi Jahan Tonu. He ordered a second autopsy of Tonu and found four separate DNA samples from her clothes. He was serving as the special superintendent of the Criminal Investigation Department's Comilla-Noakhali Division.

Khan was in the Criminal Investigation Department's Rajshahi Division when he investigated the death of Raudha Athif, a Maldivian model studying at a private medical school in Bangladesh.

In February 2023, while serving as the special superintendent of police in the Forensic Division of the Criminal Investigation Department, Khan was forced into retirement by the Awami League government of Bangladesh. The government had forcibly retired Md Mahbub Hakim, Mohammad Shahidullah Chowdhury, Delwar Hossain Mia, and Md Alamgir Alam, from same 1991 batch as Khan, the previous October. They had been recruited under President Hussain Muhammad Ershad and trained at the Bangladesh Military Academy. Mirza Abdullahel Baki of the 15th was also retired with them.

Following the fall of the Sheikh Hasina-led Awami League regime, Khan was reinstated to the police force in August 2024 along with four other police officers, Md. Ali Hossain Fakir, Abdullah Al Mamun, Delwar Hossain Mia, and Zillur Rahman. After his reinstatement, he was posted to the Dhaka Metropolitan Police as a deputy inspector general of police. In November, he was appointed commissioner of Gazipur Metropolitan Police.

A group of students attacked the home of AKM Mozammel Haque, former Minister of Liberation War Affairs, in Gazipur. The locals resisted the attempt to loot the former minister's home, injuring 13 students on 8 February 2025. In response, Khan suspended the officer-in-charge of the Gazipur Sadar Police Station and apologized to the students. The government in response launched Operation Devil Hunt to detain those who attacked the students and Awami League supporters, criminals, militants around the country. Eighty-three people were detained from Gazipur on the first day of the operation. Khan said the government was taking action to "to suppress the Awami fascism".

In April 2025, Khan was elected president of the Bangladesh Police Service Association. He was suspended in November 2025 and attached to Bangladesh Police Headquarters.

== Personal life ==
Khan's brother, Rezaul Karim Khan Chunnu, was the Bangladesh Nationalist Party candidate for Kishoraganj Sadar.
