= Shoibal Kanti Chowdhury =

Shoibal Kanti Chowdhury is a Bangladesh police officer and former commissioner of Barisal Metropolitan Police. He was removed from the post of commissioner after he was found involved in the creation of a 7.7 million taka bribery fund for police officers. He later headed the Criminal Investigation Department and the Special Security and Protection Battalion.

== Career ==
During the 2001 to 2006 Bangladesh Nationalist Party rule, police officers from Gopalganj District and Faridpur District and police officers who were religious Hindus were deprived of promotions and postings as they were perceived as loyal to the opposition Awami League. Chowdhury, a Hindu officer, found himself posted in unimportant positions and denied promotions multiple times. In 2001, he was an additional superintendent of police at the Traffic Training School. He was then posted to Chittagong District Railway Police and later the Police Headquarters. He served in the Chittagong Range Reserve Force.

On 26 May 2011, Chowdhury was promoted to additional deputy inspector general of police. He would later be promoted to Additional Inspector General of Police and posted to the Criminal Investigation Department in 2013.

Chowdhury suspended two police officers from the Armed Police Battalion of Barisal Metropolitan Police after they were found involved in extortion while impersonating personnel of the Detective Branch. Chowdhury suspended Sub-inspector Md Abdul Warres in March 2015 for torturing his third wife, a 14-year-old girl. The inspector went on the run when facing arrest for domestic violence against his wife, who was rescued by Bangladesh National Women Lawyers' Association.

In 2015, Chowdhury was the commissioner of Barisal Metropolitan Police during which time a collective fund was created for bribes to secure promotion of officers of the commission. The fund had 7.7 million taka with contribution from 230 police officers. The money was to be used to bribe senior police officers to secure promotions for the fund contributors. Chowdhury formed an investigation committee led by Deputy Commissioner Shoyeb Ahmed but was forced to close it after it came out Shoyeb Ahmed was involved in the fund. Deputy Commissioner Abu Saleh Md Raihan was appointed head of the new investigation committee on 4 July 2015. Ten police officers were suspended for being involved. Chowdhury and Deputy Commissioner Shoyeb Ahmed were transferred from Barisal Metropolitan Police on 31 August 2015 after the investigation found their involvement. In July 2017, Chowdhury was transferred from the deputy inspector general of the Criminal Investigation Department to deputy inspector general of the Special Security and Protection Battalion.
