= Krishna Pada Roy =

Bangladeshi police officer

- কৃষ্ণপাদ রায়

31st Police Commissioner of Chattogram Metropolitan Police
- In office 18 July 2022 – 3 July 2024
- Appointed by: Minister of Home Affairs
- Preceded by: Saleh Mohammad Tanvir
- Succeeded by: Md. Saiful Islam

Personal details
- Born: Tamashpur, Nabiganj, Habiganj, Bangladesh
- Education: University of Dhaka Police Training Bangladesh Police Academy
- Awards: BPM (bar); PPM (bar)
- Police career
- Allegiance: Bangladesh
- Branch: Bangladesh Police
- Service years: 1995–2024
- Status: Retired
- Rank: Additional IGP

Krishna Pada Roy is a retired additional inspector general of the Bangladesh Police and former commissioner of the Chattogram Metropolitan Police. He is a former additional commissioner of the Dhaka Metropolitan Police.

== Career ==
Roy joined the Bangladesh Police through the 15th batch of the Bangladesh Civil Service.

From 2001 to 2006, during the Bangladesh Nationalist Party rule, Roy was placed in unimportant positions along with fellow Hindu officers and officers from Gopalganj District and Faridpur District who were perceived as being loyal to the opposition Awami League. He was stationed at the Bangladesh Police Academy. He served as an additional superintendent of police in Syedpur Railway Police after that in the Armed Police Battalion of Khulna District. He was later deputed to a diplomatic mission of Bangladesh.

In February 2008, Roy was transferred from superintendent of police of Sherpur District to the Criminal Investigation Department with the rank of special superintendent of police. He was transferred from special superintendent of police of the Criminal Investigation Department in Rajshahi District in August 2008 to superintendent of police in Chandpur District. In May 2009, Roy was the superintendent of police in Chandpur District when 30 homes were burned down in an arson attack over char land.

Roy provided security to a rally of the Bangladesh Nationalist Party in 2010 as they attempted to lay siege to the Bangladesh Election Commission office over the by-election in Bhola District. In 2011, Roy was elected assistant publicity and publication secretary of the Bangladesh Police Service Association.

In April 2012, police officers under Roy, who was then the deputy commissioner (Ramna Zone) of Dhaka Metropolitan Police, assaulted two journalists from Samakal and Kaler Kantho at the University of Dhaka. Roy assured the journalists that action would be taken against the involved police officers.

Roy led raids to arrest foreigners illegally staying in Bangladesh in November and detained 31 people from different African nations. On 3 December 2014, Roy, then deputy commissioner of the Detective Branch (South), arrested three Rohingya linked with Jama'atul Mujahideen Bangladesh and the 2014 Burdwan blast in India. They were arrested after a tip-off from the National Investigation Agency of India. The suspects were also linked with the Rohingya Solidarity Organisation. The arrest followed greater cooperation between law enforcement agencies in Bangladesh and India on counterterrorism.

In April 2015, Roy was promoted from deputy commissioner to additional deputy inspector general of police. He launched a new format for filing general diaries with the Dhaka Metropolitan Police. He investigated the murder of Niloy Chatterjee.

In 2017, Roy was the joint commissioner of crime in the Dhaka Metropolitan Police. His team investigated the son of the owner of Apan Jewellers for rape at the Raintree Hotel in Dhaka.

Roy spoke at the launch of JOY, a mobile application developed by the Ministry of Women and Children Affairs for women to report violence against them and seek aid from law enforcement, at the Bangladesh Shishu Academy. In November 2018, Roy was promoted to deputy inspector general of police.

In 2019, Roy led the police action to arrest those involved with the murder of Abrar Fahad.

On 29 July 2020, Roy was the additional police commissioner of the Dhaka Metropolitan Police of crime when a bomb exploded at Pallabi Police Station under his command. The bomb was hidden in a weight scale seized by the police as evidence. The Islamic State claimed responsibility for the explosion, which the government denied. He praised the Bangladesh Police and the government for increasing the posts for senior officers, which he said would help reduce crime in Dhaka. He told the media that criminals were using the face mask requirement during the COVID-19 pandemic in Bangladesh to hide their identity.

On 18 July 2022, Roy was appointed the commissioner of the Chattogram Metropolitan Police. He was serving as the additional police commissioner of Dhaka Metropolitan Police. He replaced Saleh Mohammad Tanvir, who was appointed director of Central Police Hospital. In October, he led raids before a Bangladesh Nationalist Party rally but denied allegations that he was targeting Bangladesh Nationalist Party activists.

Roy was sent to forced retirement after the fall of the Sheikh Hasina-led Awami League government in August 2024.
