= Md. Iqbal Bahar =

Md. Iqbal Bahar is a retired police officer and former commissioner of the Chittagong Metropolitan Police. He is the former Superintendent of Police of Dhaka District.

== Career ==
In 2005, Bahar was the superintendent of police of Bandarban District.

In March 2009, Bahar was appointed Superintendent of Police of Dhaka District. He was serving as the Superintendent of Police of Jessore District.

On 10 April 2016, Bahar was appointed commissioner of the Chittagong Metropolitan Police, replacing Md. Abdul Jalil Mandal. He oversaw the arrest of Aslam Chowdhury, joint secretary of the Bangladesh Nationalist Party, in May 2016. He supervised the high-profile murder case of the wife of Superintendent of Police Babul Akter. He served till 12 July 2018 before being replaced by Md. Mahabubur Rahman. He was then promoted to Additional Inspector General of Police.

Bahar retired in 2019 while serving as the Additional Inspector General of Police at the Rajarbagh Telecommunications and Information Management.

After the fall of the Sheikh Hasina-led Awami League government, Bahar was arrested from Bailey Road, Dhaka in June 2025 by the Detective Branch. He was sent to jail in a murder case filed over the death of a protester, Shahinur Begum, in July 2024.
