= Abdul Baten =

Abdul Baten may refer to:

- Khandaker Abdul Baten, Bangladesh Awami League politician
- Abdul Baten (Patuakhali politician), Bangladesh Nationalist Party politician
- Abdul Baten Mojumdar Komol, Bangladeshi footballer
- Md. Abdul Baten, Bangladeshi inspector general
