= Mirza Rakibul Huda =

Bangladeshi former police officer

Mirza Rakibul Huda was a police officer and commissioner of the Dhaka Metropolitan Police and Chittagong Metropolitan Police. He is best known for ordering the 1988 Chittagong massacre.

== Career ==
During the Bangladesh Liberation War, Huda served as a major in the artillery unit of the Pakistan Army in Jessore. He was taken prisoner of war and returned to Bangladesh after the end of the war. He was one of 17 former officers of the Pakistan Army inducted into the Bangladesh Police by President Ziaur Rahman.

Huda ordered the Chittagong Metropolitan Police to fire on a rally of the Awami League on 24 January 1988, killing 24 in the incident known as the 1988 Chittagong massacre. The rally was led by future prime minister Sheikh Hasina. Hasina was saved by members of the Chattogram District Bar Association and taken to Chittagong Court. The bodies were taken to a crematorium, and journalists were refused access. On 5 March 1992, after the fall of President Hussain Mohammad Ershad, a case was filed over the massacre, and Huda was one of the accused by advocate Shahidul Huda. The court initially rejected the case as the accused were police officers. The police pressed charges in 1998 after Sheikh Hasina led Awami League came to power. The Criminal Investigation Department pressed supplemental charge sheets including Huda and inspector Gobinda Chandra Mondal. The plaintiff in the case died in 2005 and his son, Ershad Hossain, took over the case.

== Death ==
Huda moved to the United States with his wife. The trial stalled in 2019 over confusion if Huda was alive or dead following reports he had died in the United States.

== Legacy ==
In 2020, five police officers were sentenced to death, except Huda, who had died during the trial. Anupam Sen testified at the trial. Awami League marks 24 January as the Chittagong massacre day.
