= Md. Delwar Hossain (judge) =

Md. Delwar Hossain is a retired judge of the High Court Division of the Bangladesh Supreme Court.

== Career ==
In 2009, Justice MA Wahhab Miah and Justice Hossain rejected a petition by the former State Minister of Home Affairs, Lutfozzaman Babar, seeking an extension of bail in an arms case, directing him to surrender before the trial court where he had been earlier sentenced to 17 years’ rigorous imprisonment for illegal possession of arms.

Justice AHM Shamsuddin Chowdhury Manik and Hossain directed Moulvibazar deputy commissioner Md Mafizul Islam to appear before the High Court on 26 April 2010, to explain why contempt proceedings should not be started against him for defying its orders to allow Hasin Afroz Chowdhury to function as mayor of Kamlaganj Pourasava. They directed the Dhaka City Corporation in 2010 to maintain the status quo for three months on constructing shops at a Karwan Bazar car park site. They issued a rule asking why the structures should not be declared illegal and demolished following a public interest petition by Human Rights and Peace for Bangladesh.

Justice AHM Shamsuddin Chowdhury Manik and Hossain directed the government to maintain the status quo for three months regarding the construction of a recreation centre in the Buriganga at Kamrangirchar. It issued a rule asking why the project should not be declared illegal and the structures removed, following a writ petition by Human Rights and Peace for Bangladesh. Justices Manik and Hossain issued a contempt of court rule in May 2010 against the Chittagong Metropolitan Police Commissioner M Muniruzzaman for failing to report on actions taken over the custodial death of a security guard, ordering him to appear before the bench on June 1 following a writ petition by Human Rights and Peace for Bangladesh. They ordered the government to stop all activities of Faisal Investment Foundation which was alleged to be running illegal banking in the name of Islami Shariah.

Justice AHM Shamsuddin Chowdhury Manik and Hossain issued a verdict in June 2010 directing the Government of Bangladesh to stop all extrajudicial deaths in the custody of law enforcement agencies. Justices Manik and Hossain observed in June 2010 that law enforcers should act as friends of the people and respect human and fundamental rights, directing that orientation courses be arranged to raise their awareness after two Rapid Action Battalion personnel appeared before the court over allegations of attempting to implicate a Satkhira businessman in a false arms-possession case. Their bench imposed a three-month restriction in 2010 on the Chittagong City Corporation from converting the historic Laldighi into a swimming pool. It issued a rule asking the authorities to explain why effective measures should not be taken to protect the public water body after the Bangladesh Environmental Lawyers Association filed a writ petition.
