= Hasib Aziz =

Bangladeshi police officer (born 1971)

- হাসিব আজিজ

33th Police Commissioner of Chittagong Metropolitan Police
- In office 3 September 2024 – 1 April 2026
- Appointed by: Minister of Home Affairs
- Preceded by: Saiful Islam
- Succeeded by: Hasan Md. Shawkat Ali

Personal details
- Born: 30 December 1971 (age 54) Shariatpur, Bangladesh
- Parent: M. Azizul Haq (father)
- Relatives: Abdur Rahman Bakaul (grandfather); Abdul Aziz Munshi (Great Grandfather)
- Education: Bangladesh Police Academy
- Police career
- Allegiance: Bangladesh
- Branch: Bangladesh Police
- Service years: 1995—present
- Status: Active
- Rank: Additional IGP

Hasib Aziz, also spelled Haseeb Aziz, was the commissioner of the Chittagong Metropolitan Police of Chittagong, the second largest city of Bangladesh. He is the former head of the Interpol desk in Bangladesh.

== Early life ==
Aziz was born on 30 December 1971 in Sakhipur Union, Debhata Upazila, Shariatpur District, Bangladesh. His father, M. Azizul Haq, was a former inspector general of Bangladesh Police and advisor in the Iajuddin Ahmed ministry.

== Career ==
Aziz joined Bangladesh Police from the 15th batch of Bangladesh Civil Service on 15 November 1995.

Aziz led a police team to Chittagong University in 2004 following a bomb threat.

In 2008, Aziz was the assistant inspector general of police in charge of Interpol in Dhaka. He sought information from Hong Kong police on the wealth of Morshed Khan, former foreign minister, in the city state.

Aziz was appointed commandant (additional deputy inspector general) of the Police Training Centre, Tangail, in March 2015. He was serving in Police Telecom. He was transferred to Armed Police Battalion headquarters in May. He led an investigation into a knife attack at Dhaka Airport in 2016. He served at the CID's Detective Training School as additional deputy inspector general.

In September 2024, Aziz was appointed commissioner of Chittagong Metropolitan Police following the fall of the Sheikh Hasina-led Awami League government. He replaced Commissioner Saiful Islam while Ahsan Habib Palash was appointed deputy inspector general of police of the Chattogram Range. He was appointed with six other metropolitan commissioners around Bangladesh. Aziz launched block raids to deal with increased crime in Chittagong. He oversaw the detention of Helal Uddin Ahmed, former secretary of the Bangladesh Election Commission.
