= M. Akbar Ali (police officer) =

Bangladeshi police officer

- Occupation: Police officer
- Known for: President of Bangladesh Retired Police Officers Welfare Association

M. Akbar Ali is a retired deputy inspector general of Bangladesh Police and president of the Bangladesh Retired Police Officers Welfare Association. He served in an Independent commission formed by the Muhammad Yunus-led Interim Government to investigate the 2009 Bangladesh Rifles Mutiny. He is a former commissioner of the Chittagong Metropolitan Police, the main law enforcement agency in Chittagong, the second largest city of Bangladesh.

== Career ==
On 1 December 2007, Ali was appointed commissioner of the Chittagong Metropolitan Police, replacing Md. Mainur Rahman Chowdhury. In 2008, he petitioned a court seeking instructions on the appointment of an investigating officer to conduct further inquiry into the 2004 arms and ammunition haul in Chittagong. He served till 28 August 2008 and was replaced by Md. Moniruzzaman. He had received both the Bangladesh Police Medal (BPM) and the President Police Medal (PPM).

Ali retired as a Deputy Inspector General from the Bangladesh Police. He was the general secretary of the Bangladesh Handball Federation.

Ali serves as the president of the Bangladesh Retired Police Officers Welfare Association. In December 2024, he led a march of retired police officers against "Indian aggression". In July 2025, he presided over a roundtable discussion in Dhaka on police reform, during which participants emphasized the need for structural and institutional changes to make the police more accountable and more people-oriented. He was critical of the newly approved Police Commission as not being independent enough.

In December 2024, Ali was appointed to a seven-member independent commission to re-investigate the Bangladesh Rifles Mutiny, formed by the Muhammad Yunus-led Interim Government. The interim government was formed after the fall of the Sheikh Hasina-led Awami League government in a mass uprising. The chairman of the commission was given the rank of an Appellate Division judge, while members of the commission, including Ali, were given the rank of High Court Division judges. The commission submitted its report in November 2025, which blamed the incident on the Awami League and Prime Minister Sheikh Hasina.
