= Kazi Golam Rahman =

Commissioner of Chittagong Metropolitan Police
- In office 25 April 1983 – 17 April 1985
- Preceded by: Golam Morshed
- Succeeded by: A. F. Kabir

Personal details
- Occupation: Police officer

Kazi Golam Rahman is a retired secretary and Bangladeshi police officer who served as the Commissioner of Chittagong Metropolitan Police from 25 April 1983 to 17 April 1985. He is the president of the Board of Trustees of Hamdard Laboratories (Waqf) Bangladesh. He is a former Director General of the National Security Intelligence.

== Early life ==
Rahman belongs to the distinguished Kazi family of Feni District. His elder brother, Kazi Fazlur Rahman, was a top-ranking civil servant. Another brother, Kazi Afzalur Rahman, was a career diplomat with the foreign services of Pakistan and Bangladesh and later became a Senior Economic Affairs Analyst at the United Nations Secretariat in New York. His nephew, Kazi Sabeel Rahman, is the first American of Bangladeshi heritage to win the prestigious Rhodes Scholarship.

Rahman did an M.Com. degree before joining the East Pakistan Police service as an Assistant Superintendent of Police.

== Career ==
On 25 April 1983, Rahman was appointed commissioner of the Chittagong Metropolitan Police, replacing Golam Morshed. He served as commissioner till 17 April 1985 before being replaced by A. F. Kabir. He then served as the Deputy Inspector General of Police of the Railway Range of the Bangladesh Police.

In 1988, Rahman was the Chairman of the Sub-Committee on Programme Budget of the World Health Organization. He served as the chairman of the Bangladesh Power Development Board. He served as the managing director of Jiban Bima Corporation. He served as the secretary of the Special Affairs Division of the Prime Minister's Office.
