= Anakhanda =

Anakhanda আনাখন্ড
- Village
- Location in Bangladesh
- Coordinates: 23°15′N 90°24′E
- Country: Bangladesh
- Division: Dhaka Division
- District: Shariatpur District
- Upazila: Naria Upazila
- Union Parishad: Bhojeshwar Union
- Time zone: UTC+6 (BST)

Anakhanda (Bengali: আনাখন্ড, romanized: Anakhônḍô) is a village of Naria Upazila, Shariatpur District in the Division of Dhaka, Bangladesh.

== Education ==
According to the 2011 Bangladesh census, the literacy rate (age 7 and over) in the village was 58.5%.

== See also ==
- Districts of Bangladesh
- Divisions of Bangladesh
- Upazilas of Bangladesh
- Villages of Bangladesh
