= Saleh Mohammad Tanvir =

Bangladeshi police officer

Saleh Mohammad Tanvir is a Bangladeshi police officer and former Commissioner of Chittagong Metropolitan Police. He was the superintendent of police in Rangpur District. He is a former director of Central Police Hospital. He was the additional police commissioner of the Dhaka Metropolitan Police. He was the additional commissioner (crime and operation) of the Chittagong Metropolitan Police.

== Career ==
Tanvir was the Deputy Commissioner of Dhaka Metropolitan Police Traffic (North) in 2008.

In September 2009, Tanvir was appointed superintendent of police of Rangpur District. In 2010, he detained an employee of Bangladesh Government Press for leaking question papers from the press. He oversaw the first ever mayoral election of Rangpur City Corporation in 2012. He served as the superintendent of police of Tangail District. He was the additional commissioner (crime and operation) of the Chittagong Metropolitan Police in 2017. He was the additional deputy inspector general of police of the Police Training Centre, Tangail.

Tanvir was appointed Commissioner of Chittagong Metropolitan Police in September 2020. He was the additional police commissioner of the Dhaka Metropolitan Police. He opened the first service center of the Chittagong Metropolitan Police. He oversaw the 2021 Chattogram City Corporation election.

Tanvir proposed extending the jurisdiction of Chittagong Metropolitan Police to Karnaphuli Tunnel, Shah Amanat International Airport, and industrial zones in Anwara Upazila in July 2022. Tanvir was replaced by Krishna Pada Roy and was appointed director of the Central Police Hospital. In June 2023, he was transferred to the Special Branch. In March 2024, he was appointed Director of the National Security Intelligence (NSI). Following the fall of the Sheikh Hasina led Awami League government, Barrister Mohammad Mosharraf Hossain replaced him at the NSI.
