= M. Azizul Haq =

Bangladeshi politician (1941/1942–2025)

- এম. আজিজুল হক

Adviser for Local Government, Rural Development and Co-operativesAdviser for Civil Aviation and Tourism
- In office 1 November 2006 – 11 January 2007
- Chief Adviser: Iajuddin Ahmed
- Preceded by: Abdul Mannan Bhuiyan; Akbar Hossain
- Succeeded by: Anwarul Iqbal; M. A. Matin

Inspector General of Bangladesh Police
- In office 22 April 1996 – 16 November 1997
- President: Abdur Rahman Biswas; Shahabuddin Ahmed
- Prime Minister: Muhammad Habibur Rahman; (acting); Sheikh Hasina
- Preceded by: A. S. M. Shahjahan
- Succeeded by: Md Ismail Hossain

Adviser for Shipping

Personal details
- Born: 13 December 1940 Faridpur Sadar Upazila, Faridpur
- Died: 15 January 2025 (aged 84) Dhaka, Bangladesh
- Children: Hasib Aziz
- Parent: Abdur Rahman Bakaul (father)
- Education: University of Dhaka; University of Canberra
- Awards: Bangladesh Police Medal (Bravery) – BPM
- Relatives: Abdul Aziz Munshi (grandfather)
- Police career
- Allegiance: Pakistan; (1964–1971); Bangladesh; (1971–1997)
- Branch: Bangladesh Police; East Pakistan Police
- Service years: 1964—1997
- Rank: IGP

M. Azizul Haq (13 December 1940 – 15 January 2025) was a Bangladeshi police officer who was inspector general of the Bangladesh Police and an adviser to the caretaker government of Bangladesh. He was in charge of the Ministry of Local Government and Rural Development, the Ministry of Shipping, and the Ministry of Civil Aviation and Tourism at the Iajuddin Ahmed ministry from November 2006 until January 2007, when the Fakhruddin Ahmed ministry took over.

== Background and education ==
Haq originates from the Jhiltuly village under Faridpur Sadar Upazila in Faridpur. He earned his bachelor's and master's degrees from the University of Dhaka in 1960 and 1961 in the Economics Department, respectively. He later got a postgraduate degree in public administration from the University of Canberra.

== Career ==
Haq started his career at the State Bank of Pakistan in 1964, later joining law enforcement in Pakistan (Pakistan police service) as an assistant superintendent of police in 1965. He served as the Inspector General of Bangladesh Police from 22 April 1996 until 16 November 1997.

In July 1997, in the wake of the film actor Salman Shah's death, Haq, as the then IGP, referred the case to the Criminal Investigation Department (CID) for further investigation.

Haq went on to retire from the police force on 11 December 1998. He then worked as a management and financial consultant for Rupali Insurance Company till mid-2020.

Haq was appointed an adviser in charge of the Ministry of Local Government, Rural Development and Co-operatives during the interim government of 2007.

== Personal life and death ==
Haq has three sons: Asif Aziz, the head of Cash Management Operations of the Standard Chartered Bank; Hasib Aziz, commissioner of Chattogram Metropolitan Police; and Tawfiq Aziz, a physician of medicine and gastroenterology. He has 8 grandchildren.

Haq died from a heart attack in the Uttara neighborhood of Dhaka on 15 January 2025, at the age of 84.
