= Kazi Fazlur Rahman =

Bangladeshi politician (1932–2025)

- কাজী ফজলুর রহমান

Adviser for Irrigation, Forest, Environment, Fisheries and Livestock
- In office 17 December 1990 – 15 March 1991
- President: Mohammed Shahabuddin

Personal details
- Born: 1 November 1932 Feni, Bengal Presidency, British India
- Died: 13 December 2025 (aged 93) Dhaka, Bangladesh
- Relatives: Kazi Golam Rahman (brother); Kazi Sabeel Rahman (nephew)
- Education: University of Dhaka; Harvard Kennedy School
- Awards: Independence Award (2026)

Kazi Fazlur Rahman (1 November 1932 – 13 December 2025) was a Bangladeshi career bureaucrat and adviser, with the rank of minister, of Shahabuddin Ahmed interim government. He was in charge of the Ministry of Irrigation, Forest, Environment, Fisheries and Livestock. He was a trustee of Gono University. In 2026, he was posthumously awarded Independence Award, the highest civilian honour of Bangladesh.

== Early life and career ==
Rahman was born in Feni District, Bengal Presidency on 1 November 1932. He earned his bachelor's and master's degrees in statistics from the University of Dhaka by 1953. He then got his master's in public administration from the Graduate School of Public Administration (now Kennedy School of Government), Harvard University in 1962.

Rahman joined the Central Superior Service of Pakistan.

== Personal life and death ==
Rahman's brother, Kazi Golam Rahman, was a senior police officer, and another brother, Kazi Afzalur Rahman, was a diplomat. His nephew, Kazi Sabeel Rahman is a professor of law at Cornell Law School.

Rahman died on 13 December 2025, at the age of 93.
