= Gazipur Metropolitan Police =

Law enforcement agency in Bangladesh

Gazipur Metropolitan Police গাজীপুর মেট্রোপলিটন পুলিশ
- Abbreviation: GMP

Agency overview
- Formed: 16 September 2018

Jurisdictional structure
- Operations jurisdiction: Gazipur, Bangladesh
- Area: 329.23 km^{2} (127.12 sq mi)
- Population: 2,677,715 (2022)
- Governing body: Ministry of Home Affairs
- Constituting instrument: Gazipur Metropolitan Police Act,2018
- General nature: Local civilian police

Operational structure
- Headquarters: Police line, Gazipur, Bangladesh
- Minister responsible: Salahuddin Ahmed, Minister of Home Affairs
- Agency executive: DIG Israil Hawladar, Police Commissioner
- Parent agency: Bangladesh Police
- Special Units: Detective Branch

Facilities
- Stations: 8
- Armored vehicles: Otokar Cobra, IAG Guardian, STREIT Typhoon
- Helicopters: Bell 407

Website
- gmp.gov.bd
- Service uniform: Yankees Blue, Light French Beige Combat uniform: Oak Brown, Brown Derby

Gazipur Metropolitan Police (Bengali: গাজীপুর মেট্রোপলিটন পুলিশ, romanized: Gājīpura mēṭrōpaliṭana puliśa; abbreviated as GMP) is the primary metropolitan unit of the Bangladesh Police, responsible for law enforcement, public safety, and crime prevention within the metropolis of Gazipur, a major city near Dhaka in Bangladesh. Established in 2018 under the Gazipur Metropolitan Police Ordinance, GMP oversees policing operations, administration, and coordination with other law enforcement and emergency agencies in the city. The force is headed by a Police Commissioner who manages all operational and administrative functions.

== History ==
The government of Bangladesh announced plans to establish Gazipur Metropolitan Police and Rangpur Metropolitan Police in December 2015 at a cabinet meeting chaired by Prime Minister Sheikh Hasina.

In November 2017, the Cabinet of Bangladesh approved Gazipur and Rangpur Metropolitan Police drafts.

A woman, Yasmin Begum, died in the custody of the Detective Branch of Gazipur Metropolitan Police a few hours after she had been detained. Her family had demanded that her death in custody be investigated by a judicial commission. Councilor of Gazipur City, Ruhun Nesa Runa, was arrested in March 2020 after she assaulted two traffic police constables who stopped her car, which was driving on the wrong side of the road.

A woman miscarried after a constable of Gazipur Metropolitan Police assaulted her in March 2022. The constable was later withdrawn from the Kashimpur Police Station. On 2 April 2022, seven members of Gazipur Metropolitan Police were injured in clashes with Hefazat-e-Islam Bangladesh. In April 2022, two police constables were transferred for assaulting the chauffeur of the Deputy Commissioner of Gazipur District.

== Former Commissioners ==
Sl. No.	Police Commissioner	From	To	Reference
1	Y. M. Belalur Rahman	24 July 2018	8 April 2019	
2	Md. Anwar Hossain	4 September 2019	3 September 2020	
3	Khandaker Lutful Kabir	29 September 2020	13 July 2022	
4	Mollah Nazrul Islam	13 July 2022	6 June 2023	
5	Md. Mahbub Alam	6 June 2023	21 August 2024	
6	Khandaker Rafiqul Islam	5 September 2024	24 October 2024	
7	Dr. Md. Nazmul Karim Khan	11 December 2024	11 November 2025	

== List of police stations under GMP ==
- Bason Thana (Bengali: বাসন থানা, lit. 'Bason Police Station') – The officer-in-charge (OC) of Bason Thana is Shahin Khan.
- Gacha Thana (Bengali: গাছা থানা, lit. 'Gacha Police Station')
- Joydebpur Thana (Bengali: জয়দেবপুর থানা, lit. 'Joydebpur Police Station') is located in the middle of Gazipur district. Sreepur Upazila is in the north, Gazipur City Corporation and Rupganj Upazila are in the south. Kaliganj and Sreepur upazilas are in the east and Kaliakair Upazila is in the west. The police outposts Hotapara Police Fari and Sadar Police Fari are under Joydebpur Thana.
- Kashimpur Thana (Bengali: কাশিমপুর থানা, lit. 'Kashimpur Police Station')
- Pubail Thana (Bengali: পূবাইল থানা, lit. 'Pubail Police Station')
- Tongi East Thana (Bengali: টঙ্গী পূর্ব থানা, lit. 'Tongi East Police Station')
- Tongi West Thana (Bengali: টঙ্গী পশ্চিম থানা, lit. 'Tongi West Police Station')
