= Barisal Metropolitan Police =

Metropolitan police unit in Bangladesh

Barishal Metropolitan Police বরিশাল মেট্রোপলিটন পুলিশ
- Crest of Barishal Metropolitan Police
- Common name: Metropolitan Police
- Abbreviation: BMP

Agency overview
- Formed: 26 October 2006

Jurisdictional structure
- Operations jurisdiction: Barisal, Bangladesh
- Area: 69.61 km^{2} (26.88 sq mi)
- Population: 448,152 (2022)
- Governing body: Ministry of Home Affairs
- Constituting instrument: The Barisal Metropolitan Police Ordinance, 2006
- General nature: Local civilian police

Operational structure
- Headquarters: BMP Police Line, Barisal
- Minister responsible: Salahuddin Ahmed, Minister of Home Affairs
- Agency executive: DIG Sofikul Islam, Police Commissioner
- Parent agency: Bangladesh Police
- Special Units: Detective Branch

Facilities
- Stations: 4
- Armored vehicles: Otokar Cobra, IAG Guardian, STREIT Typhoon
- Helicopters: Bell 407

Website
- bmp.police.gov.bd
- Service uniform: Yankees Blue, Light French Beige Combat uniform: Oak Brown, Brown Derby

The Barisal Metropolitan Police (Bengali: বরিশাল মেট্রোপলিটন পুলিশ, romanized: Bariśāl mēṭrōpaliṭana puliśa; abbreviated as BMP) is the primary metropolitan unit of the Bangladesh Police, responsible for law enforcement, public safety, and crime prevention within the metropolis of Barisal, a major city in southern Bangladesh. Established in 2006 under the Barisal Metropolitan Police Ordinance, BMP oversees policing operations, administration, and coordination with other law enforcement and emergency agencies in the city. The force is headed by a Police Commissioner who manages all operational and administrative functions.

== History ==
Bangladesh Parliament passed Barisal Metropolitan Police Act in 2009 which allowed Barisal Metropolitan Police, it was founded in 2006.

Police clashes with students of Shahid Abdur Rab Serniabat Textile Engineering College who were on strike in June 2011.

In August 2013, Md Shamsuddin, commissioner of Barisal Metropolitan Police, was appointed commissioner of Khulna Metropolitan Police.

In December 2014, the police baton charged a rally of students from Barisal Health Technology Institute injuring 18-23 students. The police action was condemned by civil society and The Daily Star in an editorial.

In July 2015, the deputy commissioner of Barisal Metropolitan Police, Zillur Rahman, was suspended for creating a 7.7 million taka bribe fund for the promotion of 230 police officers. Another deputy commissioner, Shoyeb Ahmed, knew about the fund and was subsequently removed from the investigation into the fund. Commissioner Shoibal Kanti Chowdhury was removed over his involvement in the fund.

In January 2016, a halt on promotions and increments were placed on ten officers of Barisal Metropolitan Police accused of creating a collective fund for bribes for promotions. Officer in charge of Agailjhara Police Station, Monirul Islam, had an altercation with a Swechchhasebak League activist. a Swechchhasebak League activist went to complain to the local MP, Abul Hasnat Abdullah, and while leaving the residence of Abul Hasnat Abdullah he was assaulted by a police constable who was later suspended. In February, a sub inspector of Barisal Airport Police Station was suspended for extortion. Barisal Metropolitan Police in August ordered the closure of Peace School and College.

Police clashed with traders in February 2017 when they tried to stop an eviction drive of the Barisal City Corporation. In March a constable was suspended for taking selfies with the Ministry of Industries, Amir Hossain Amu, at the Barisal Women's College while on duty.

Eight officers of the Detective Branch unit of Barisal Metropolitan Police were suspended for assaulting a journalist of DBC News and then further torturing him in custody in March 2018. The also assaulted senior journalists who visited the police station to see the detained journalist.

Three police officers of Barisal Metropolitan Police were suspended for assaulting two journalists who went to cover a COVID-19 program where the Upazila Nirbahi Officer Moshareaf Hossain addressed in 2020.

Barisal Metropolitan Police provided oxygen during the COVID-19 pandemic in Bangladesh. In August 2021, the Barisal Metropolitan police baton charged Awami League activists and employees of Barishal City Corporation outside the office of the Upazila Nirbahi officer. Munibur Rahman, Barisal Sadar Upazila Nirbahi Officer filed two cases against Mayor Serniabat Sadiq Abdullah and Awami League activists.

== List of commissioners ==
Name	Start date	End date	Reference
Muhammad Aminul Islam	26 October 2006	13 November 2006	
Md. Moniruzzaman	14 November 2006	31 January 2007	
Khan Saeed Hasan	5 February 2007	31 August 2008	
M. Akbar Ali	31 August 2008	16 March 2009	
Md. Abdur Rahim	20 March 2009	1 March 2011	
Syed Taufiq Uddin Ahmed	6 March 2011	1 May 2012	
Md. Shamsuddin	1 May 2012	16 October 2014	
Shaibal Kanti Chowdhury	19 October 2014	16 September 2015	
Md. Lutfar Rahman Mondal	16 September 2015	14 June 2016	
S. M. Ruhul Amin	21 June 2016	30 April 2018	
Mahfuzur Rahman	1 May 2018	1 August 2018	
Mosharraf Hossain	1 August 2018	9 April 2019	
Md. Shahabuddin Khan	12 April 2019	17 May 2022	

== Police stations ==
Barisal Metropolitan Police consists of 8 police stations (thanas):

1. Kotwali Model Thana, Barisal
2. Airport Thana
3. Kawnia Thana, Barisal
4. Bandar Thana, Barisal

There are some proposed police stations that is interested of being linked to BMP since 2018 that are still waiting for approval. They are:

1. Rupatali Thana
2. Barisal University Thana
3. Char Monai Thana
4. Kashipur Thana

There is also a Police camp, the most notable one is:

1. University of Barisal camp
