= Murder of Shamim Reza Rubel =

1998 crime in Bangladesh

The murder of Shamim Reza Rubel is the murder of a private university student that took place in police custody and created a landmark legal case in Bangladesh.

== History ==
=== Incident ===
Shamim Reza Rubel was a BBA student at the Independent University, Bangladesh, a private university. On 23 July 1998, he was taken from his home in Siddeswari by undercover members of the Detective Branch of the Bangladesh Police who started beating him immediately and accused him of having illegal weapons. He was taken to the Detective Branch office in Mintu Road. He was tortured in custody and forced to admit he had illegal weapons. They took him back to his house to recover the weapons, but could not find any. Rubel admitted that he confessed to stop the torture. They continued to beat him, and his screams could be heard in the neighbourhood. He was taken back to the Detective Branch, and there he died in custody. His autopsy report said he died from hemorrhage and shock caused by severe beating.

=== Case ===
In 1998, Human Rights organizations challenged the power of the Bangladesh Police to arrest people and torture them in custody arbitrarily. On 3 April 2003, the Bangladesh High Court issued a ruling that halted the government's ability to detain people under the Special Powers Act on mere suspicion. The Bangladesh Nationalist Party-led government filed an appeal with the Appellate Division of the Supreme Court. On 24 May 2016, the Supreme Court of Bangladesh upheld the High Court's verdict with some modifications, significantly reducing the government's power to detain individuals on suspicion.

Rubel's father, Abdur Rob Miah, had filed a case against 14 people, including a neighbour of Rubel, Mukuli Begum. Another accused was Detective Branch assistant commissioner Akram Hussain, who led the team that arrested Rubel. In June 2003, the court sentenced 13 of the accused to life in prison and Mukuli Begum to one year imprisonment. The Bangladesh High Court on 5 May 2011 acquitted 11 of the 12 convicted, excluding police officer Hayatul Islam Thakur. Serajul Huq defended Akram Hussain. After Serajul Huq died, Hussain was defended by the son of Serajul Huq, who was the incumbent Minister of Law Anisul Huq. On 31 August 2015, the Supreme Court of Bangladesh asked Akram to surrender and allowed the government to file an appeal against the Bangladesh High Court verdict. This came after the government filed a petition against the verdict.
