= M. M. Sharif Ali =

Commissioner of Chittagong Metropolitan Police
- In office 30 November 1978 – 27 July 1980
- Succeeded by: A. H. M. B. Zaman

Personal details
- Born: Bangladesh
- Occupation: Police officer
- Known for: First Commissioner of Chittagong Metropolitan Police

M. M. Sharif Ali is a retired Bangladeshi police officer who served as the first Commissioner of the Chittagong Metropolitan Police, responsible for law enforcement in the second largest city of Bangladesh, Chittagong, from its inception in 1978. He pioneered in establishing the early structure and operations of the Chittagong Metropolitan Police.

== Career ==
Colonel Ali was a director of West Pakistan Small Industries Corporation.

The Chittagong Metropolitan Police officially began operations on 30 November 1978 under the leadership of M. M. Sharif Ali, following the enactment of the Chittagong Metropolitan Police Ordinance, 1978. At the time, CMP’s jurisdiction covered 128 square miles, serving a population of approximately 1 million.

Under Sharif Ali’s command, CMP began with six police stations, thirty outposts, and six police boxes. The department was initially divided into two main crime divisions—North Division and Port Division—along with Headquarters Division, City Special Branch (City SB), and Traffic Division.

Sharif Ali road in Chittagong in named after Ali.
