= Md Mahbub Alam =

Md Mahbub Alam is a Brigadier General of the Bangladesh Army and a former Additional Director General (operations) of the Rapid Action Battalion.

== Career ==
Alam was appointed Additional Director General (operations) of Rapid Action Battalion in May 2023. He replaced Kamrul Hasan who returned to Bangladesh Army. He was previously working at the Directorate General of Forces Intelligence.

In 2024, Alam commanded Rapid Action Battalion-7 based in Chittagong. In May, he oversaw the surrender of 50 robbers in the Chittagong along with Home Minister Asaduzzaman Khan Kamal, Inspector General of Police Chowdhury Abdullah Al-Mamun, Rapid Action Battalion Director General M Khurshid Hossain, Chattogram Metropolitan Police Commissioner Krishna Pada Roy, Member of Parliament M. Abdul Latif, and Chittagong Divisional Commissioner Tofayel Islam.

After the fall of the Sheikh Hasina-led Awami League government, the Muhammad Yunus led Interim government established the Commission of Inquiry on Enforced Disappearances. The commission submitted its report in January 2026 and identified Alam as one of the people involved in Enforced Disappearance of Barrister Mir Ahmad Bin Quasem Arman.

In October 2025, Alam was detained by Bangladesh Army and Kept in a specialized jail in Dhaka Cantonment along with 14 other Army officers. They had been charged with crimes against humanity at the International Crimes Tribunal-1 over alleged Enforced Disappearance under Prime Minister Sheikh Hasina.
