= Law and Political Economy Project =

Collaborative project that examines the relationship between the law and capitalism

LPE Project
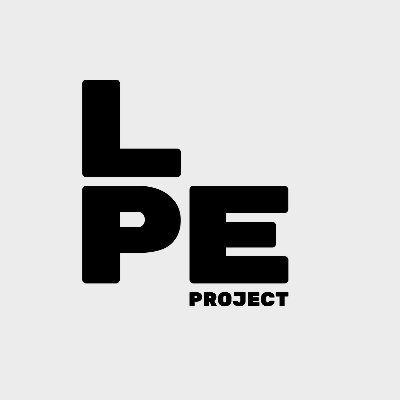
- Formation: 2019
- Legal status: 501(c)(3) nonprofit
- Founders: Amy Kapczynski, K. Sabeel Rahman, David Grewal Singh, Jedediah Britton-Purdy
- Website: https://lpeproject.org/

The Law and Political Economy Project (LPE) is a collaborative project that examines the relationship between the law and capitalism. In addition to a blog, the Project regularly hosts speaking events, debates, and lectures. It also circulates printed materials, hosts a summer academy and runs mentoring programs.

== History ==
In 2016, a group of Yale Law School students asked Amy Kapczynski, a faculty member at Yale, to teach a seminar that would allow them to better understand the social, political, and legal structures that gave rise to the election of President Donald Trump. Later that year, the LPE Blog was launched.

In 2019, the LPE Project was officially established, expanding the blog into a nationwide network of legal scholars, practitioners, and law students, with Corinne Blalock as its first executive director. While the Project is operated and administered by staff at Yale, the LPE project has ten official student chapters and many more clusters spread across the country.

In 2020, LPE Europe was established as a research network for LPE thinkers in Europe. In 2023, Gujarat National Law University became the first National Law University in India to have a chapter dedicated to the LPE Project.

== Background ==
The LPE Project follows other left legal traditions, including legal realism, critical legal studies (CLS), Critical Race Theory (CRT), Feminist Legal Theory, and other schools of critical legal thought, in challenging the role of law in creating and maintaining inequality and systems of oppression. According to Blalock, the network looks not only to challenge law and economics’ hegemony, but to reimagine the role of the courts in democratic society (beyond all forms of liberalism). In doing so, LPE challenges legal pedagogy and education, viewing all fields of law, including “private law” inseparable from concerns of social justice and democracy. Specifically, the LPE Project has called for an end to the separation of law students studying "social justice" and those studying "economics". The LPE Project can be also understood as a response to neoliberal and conservative intellectual infrastructure, in opposition to the groups like the Olin Foundation and the Federalist Society.

The Journal of Law and Political Economy defines itself as a journal in 'the Law and Political Economy ecosystem.'

== Methods ==
The LPE Project's methods are repeating and revising previous work in critical legal theory and confronting long term policy phenomena that defy traditional legal analysis, including social problems rooted in political economy, by constructing new legal structures. The Project also challenges popular understandings of what constitutes the economy, because these definitions imply valuations of work, people and geographies that legal theory operates on and within. The Project contests these boundaries by using critiques stemming from social justice scholarship and new boundaries are informed by feminist theory and pays particular attention to issues surrounding settler colonialism and racial capitalism.

In 2020–2021, the LPE Project hosted the widely attended “Law & Political Economy: Democracy Beyond Neoliberalism'' Conference as part of a deliberate effort to critically transform legal thought. The conference also hosted several “Emerging Scholars Workshops,” pairing young lawyers with mentors and faculty.
