= Khandaker Lutful Kabir =

Khandaker Lutful Kabir is a retired Additional Inspector General of Bangladeshi police, and former commissioner of the Gazipur Metropolitan Police and Khulna Metropolitan Police. He previously served as commander of Rapid Action Battalion-4.

== Career ==
In 2008, Kabir was the Superintendent of Police of Khagrachari District. In 2009, Kabir was the Superintendent of Police of Noakhali District.

Kabir worked as a deputy commissioner of Gulshan Division of the Dhaka Metropolitan Police in the early 2010s. He oversaw the detention of a former Nigerian Footballer, Emeka Ezeugo, with a licensed gun belonging to Kaiser Hamid. Emeka Ezeugo had arrived in the country to watch a football match of the Nigerian Football Team. In 2012, Kabir, told the Associated Press that detectives had arrested a former Saudi Embassy employee over an allegedly threatening text message sent to the embassy’s chargé d’affaires. He oversaw security arrangements regarding former Prime Minister Khaleda Zia. He told the Dhaka Tribune that additional police deployed around the residence and office of opposition leader Khaleda Zia had been withdrawn; she stopped being the opposition leader after boycotting the 2014 election.

Kabir served as the commanding officer of Rapid Action Battalion-4.

Kabir was a director of Rapid Action Battalion in 2018 when he was transferred to the Anti Terrorism Unit as it's DIG. He replaced Monirul Islam who had been posted to the Dhaka Metropolitan Police.

Kabir was the Commissioner of the Khulna Metropolitan Police. He oversaw the detention of two students of Khulna University who were affiliated with neo-Jama'atul Mujahideen Bangladesh and had attacked an outpost of Bangladesh Police and the office of the Krishak League. A bombing there at the local ward office of the Awami League had targeted it's Khan Jahan Ali Thana unit President Sheikh Abid Hossain.

On 29 September 2020, Kabir was appointed commissioner of the Gazipur Metropolitan Police replacing Md. Anwar Hossain. Md Masudur Rahman Bhuiyan replaced him as the Commissioner of Khulna Metropolitan Police. He served in that position till 13 July 2022 and was replaced by Mollah Nazrul Islam. He was then posted to the Bangladesh Police Headquarters.

After the fall of the Sheikh Hasina-led Awami League government on 5 August 2024, Kabir was among 626 people, including 515 police officers, who sought shelter in various cantonments around Bangladesh. He was sent into forced retirement in September 2024 as an Additional Inspector General of Police (IGP) along with Additional IGP Mir Rezaul Alam, DIG Imam Hossain, and Additional DIG Chowdhury Manjurul Kabir.

In December 2024, the Ministry of Home Affairs asked the Department of Immigration and Passports and the Special Branch of police to take steps to prevent 20 current and former officials from leaving the country, in connection with allegations of involvement in enforced disappearances. The request followed a letter from the Commission of Inquiry on Enforced Disappearance. Kabir was named among the officials. The Anti-Corruption Commission began an investigation against 50 police officers including Kabir.
