= Ram Thakur =

19th century Bengali guru

Sri Sri Ramthakur
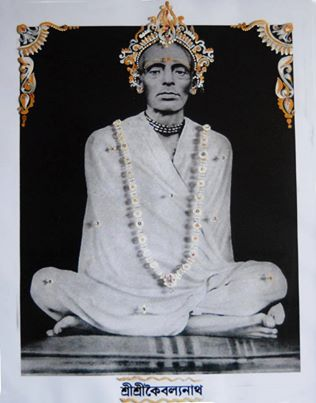
- Ramthakur

Personal life
- Born: 2 February 1860 Dingamanik, Faridpur, Bengal Presidency, British India
- Died: 1 May 1949 (aged 89) Noakhali, Dominion of Pakistan

Religious life
- Religion: Sanatan Dharma

Sri Kaibalyanath (Bengali: শ্রী কৈবল্যনাথ) (2 February 1860 – 1 May 1949), was a Bengali guru during 19th-century. He was born as Ram Chandra Chakraborty (Bengali: রাম চন্দ্র চক্রবর্তী) in Dingamanik, Faridpur (now in Bangladesh), then part of British India. It is believed that he is an avatar of Vishnu and is affectionately referred to as Bhagwan by his followers.
