= Abdul Aziz Munshi =

Bengali politician (1885–1949)

Khan Saheb Abdul Aziz Munshi
- আব্দুল আজিজ মুন্সী

Member of Bengal Legislative Assembly (Madaripur East)
- In office 1946 – 14 August 1947
- Monarch: George VI
- Governors General: Earl Wavell; Earl Mountbatten
- Prime Minister: Huseyn Shaheed Suhrawardy

Personal details
- Born: 3 May 1885 Charatra, Bengal Presidency, British India
- Died: 1 June 1949 (aged 64) Bengal, Pakistan (Now Bangladesh)
- Relatives: Abdur Rahman Bakaul (Son in law); M. Azizul Haq (Grandson); Hasib Aziz (Great Grandson)
- Occupation: Politician
- Known for: Member of the Bengal Legislative Assembly

Abdul Aziz Munshi (Urdu: عبدالعزیز منشی; Bengali: আব্দুল আজিজ মুন্সী; 3 May 1885 – 1 June 1949) was a Bengali politician and a member of the Bengal Legislative Assembly during the British era. He took part in provincial politics in Bengal before the partition of India in 1947.

== Early life ==
Munshi was born in Charatra, a locality near the Padma River. He received the honorary title Khan Saheb from the British Government for his public service.

== Political career ==
Munshi was a member of the All-India Muslim League. He had won the Madaripur-2 seat in 1946 Bengal Legislative Assembly election and served as a member of the Bengal Legislative Assembly from 1946 till August, 1947.

== Legacy and death ==
Munshi was awarded the title Khan Saheb by the British government in recognition of his contribution during the Bengal famine of 1943.

He died on 1 June 1949, shortly after the partition of India.
