= Abu Ishaque =

Bangladeshi novelist (1926–2003)

- আবু ইসহাক
- Born: Abu Bashar Mohammad Ishaque; 1 November 1926; Shirangol, Faridpur, Bengal Presidency, British India
- Died: 16 February 2003 (aged 76–77)
- Education: Karachi University
- Parents: Muhammad Ibadullah (father); Athar un-Nisa (mother)

Abu Bashar Mohammad Ishaque (Bengali: আবু ইসহাক; 1 November 1926 – 16 February 2003) was a Bangladeshi novelist. He graduated with a B.A. from Karachi University. He was the deputy director of NSI.

== Early life ==
Ishaque was born in the village of Shirangal in Naria, Faridpur District (now in Shariatpur District) on 1 November 1926. He studied at the Upsi Bijari Taraprasanna English High School, from which he passed his matriculation exam with a scholarship in 1942. In 1944, he completed his IA from Government Rajendra College in Faridpur.

== Career ==
His first story, "Abhishap", was published in 1940 in the Nabajug magazine, which was edited by the activist Kazi Nazrul Islam. This was when Abu Ishaque was still in high school. The story was later featured in the Saogat and The Azad magazines of Calcutta.

His first job was as an inspector for a private institution. Ishaque's first big literary effort, Sūrja-Dīghal Baṛī, was completed in August 1948, though he waited some seven years for a publisher. After the Partition of India in 1947, he became an assistant inspector for the Pakistan police department and was based in the cities of Karachi, Rawalpindi, and Islamabad up until 1956. Graduating from Karachi University in 1960, he served in many important posts in the country as well as in diplomatic positions in the high commission offices.

In 1973, Ishaque became a sub-director for the National Security Intelligence based in Dhaka. He served as vice-consul at the Bangladeshi embassy in Akyab, Myanmar, in 1974. Ishaque became the first secretary for the Bangladesh Deputy High Commission at Kolkata in 1976. In 1979, he started serving as the chief of the National Security Intelligence's Khulna Branch. He retired from the government service in 1984.

== Works ==
Three novels - one of which is a detective novel, two collections of short stories, and the voluminous Samokalin Bangla Bhashar Obhidhan (the first two parts of it have already been published from the Bangla Academy, and the rest [how many?] are being prepared).

=== Novels ===
- Surja-Dighal Bari (1955)
- Padmar Palidwip (1986)
- Jaal (1988)

=== Short stories ===
- "Jook"
- "MahaPatanga" (Large Insect)
- "Haarem"

== Awards ==
- Bangla Academy Literary Award (1963)
- Ekushey Padak (1997)
- Independence Day Award (2004) Posthumously
