= Psycho Samrat =

Bangladeshi serial killer

- সাইকো সম্রাট
- Born: Sabuj Sheikh c. 1986; Savar, Dhaka, Bangladesh
- Died: March 24, 2026 (aged 39–40); Shahbag, Dhaka, Bangladesh
- Other names: Mashiur Rahman Khan Samrat; Tiger Samrat; Sumon
- Children: 1
- Status: Deceased
- Motive: Resentment of "immorality"
- Criminal charges: Murder

Details
- Victims: 6
- Span of crimes: 2025–2026
- Country: Bangladesh
- Location: Savar
- Killed: 6
- Date apprehended: January 18, 2026
- Imprisoned at: Dhaka Central Jail

Sabuj Sheikh (Bengali: সবুজ শেখ; born c. 1985–86), known as Psycho Samrat (Bengali: সাইকো সম্রাট) or Tiger Samrat (Bengali: টাইগার সম্রাট), initially reported under the pseudonym Mashiur Rahman Khan Samrat (Bengali: মশিউর রহমান খান সম্রাট), was a Bangladeshi vagrant and serial killer whom confessed to the murders of six people from 2025 to 2026 after being detained.

== Background ==
Sabuj Sheikh was born approximately around 1986 and is from Savar, Dhaka Division, specifically Savar's Bank Colony Area. His father was a certain Salam from the same area and his mother is a certain Momtaz Begum. Sheikh was a vagrant whom, many locals, including his mother, claimed, is mentally unwell, however, after his arrest, police found no signs or symptoms to suggest that he has a mental illness.

Sheikh had a younger brother, Jibon Sheikh. According to him, Sheikh used to study at a madrasa before dropping out and starting to act unusual. Also according to Jibon Sheikh, when interviewed in January 2026, "Sabuj came home around one month ago after around a two-year-gap. Earlier, Sabuj was sent to a rehab for a few days. He was even in jail for a few days."

According to Momtaz Begum, Sheikh's mother, Sheikh was married once before his wife abandoned him. He has a son.

== Murders ==
On July 4, 2025, the corpse of Asma Begum, a 75-year-old elderly woman, was recovered from behind a tea shop near the Savar Model Mosque in the afternoon. A case was filed and she was the first victim of Sheikh's that has been identified.

On August 29, 2025, the half-melted corpse of an unidentified man, around 30 years old, was recovered from the second floor of the abandoned Savar Municipal Community Centre with his hands tied with a towel and a veil tied around his neck. A case was filed the same day at Savar Model Thana.

On October 11, 2025, the corpse of an unidentified woman, around 30 years old, was recovered from near a bathroom on the second floor of the abandoned Savar Municipal Community Centre with her throat slit, police initially suspected that she was killed and the body was dumped there later. A case was filed on October 13.

On December 19, 2025, the half-melted corpse of an unidentified man, around 35 years old, was recovered from a bathroom on the second floor of the abandoned Savar Municipal Community Centre, the state of the corpse made it unidentifiable.

On January 18, 2026, two corpses of an unidentified girl, around 13 years old, and Tania Akhter, a 25-year-old woman, were recovered from a bathroom on the second floor of the abandoned Savar Municipal Community Centre. Both bodies were burnt and, thus, unidentifiable. According to witnesses, a student of Savar College had entered the Savar Municipal Community Centre to "respond to the call of nature" before discovering the burnt corpses and dialing 999.

== Arrest ==
On January 18, 2026, after going through CCTV footage, the Detective Branch detained Sheikh from Savar's Muktir Mor Area for questioning due to him showing suspicious behavior in the footage. Sheikh confessed to the murders of all six victims and was sent to court so the police could receive a 10-day remand to question him further. He was later sent to prison after his confession in court. While his punishment was not mentioned, under Section 302 of Chapter XVI of the Penal Code of 1860, Sheikh could have faced life imprisonment or the death penalty.

According to The Business Standard, Sheikh gave his motivation for the murders, of the female victims at least, as having been out of resentment for women whom, he believed, were involved in "immoral activities" at night.

According to The Daily Star, Sheikh gave his motivation for the murders as being to keep people, specifically people he believed were mentally ill, from living in the area.

== Death ==
On March 23, 2026, while being imprisoned at Dhaka Central Jail in Keraniganj, Sheikh complained about sudden severe chest pain. He was rushed to the Dhaka Medical College Hospital in Shahbag and declared dead by the doctors the next morning.

== See also ==
- List of serial killers by country
