= Md. Moniruzzaman =

Deputy Inspector General Md. Moniruzzaman
- Occupation: Police officer
- Office: Commissioner of Rangpur Metropolitan Police
- Police career
- Rank: Deputy Inspector General of Police

Md. Moniruzzaman is a Bangladeshi police officer who served as the third Commissioner of the Rangpur Metropolitan Police from 25 June 2023 until 13 August 2024. He was the Commissioner of the Chittagong Metropolitan Police.

== Career ==
In August 2008, Moniruzzaman was appointed Commissioner of the Chittagong Metropolitan Police. He was previously the Deputy Inspector General of the Dhaka Range of Bangladesh Police.

Justices AHM Shamsuddin Chowdhury Manik and justice Md. Delwar Hossain issued a contempt of court rule in May 2010 against the Chittagong Metropolitan Police Commissioner Moniruzzaman for failing to report on actions taken over the custodial death of a security guard, ordering him to appear before the bench on June 1 following a writ petition by Human Rights and Peace for Bangladesh.

Additional Commissioner Abdul Jalil Mandal of the Chittagong Metropolitan Police was withdrawn on 5 July 2010 and asked to report to the Police Headquarters, with no reason cited for his transfer, according to then-Commissioner Moniruzzaman. He was promoted to additional deputy inspector general in 2017.

Moniruzzaman joined the Rangpur Metropolitan Police as Commissioner on 25 June 2023. He had previously served in the Anti Terrorism Unit. Upon assuming office, he paid tribute at the mural of Sheikh Mujibur Rahman, the founding father of Bangladesh, at DC Mour Intersection in Rangpur city. Moniruzzaman urged members of the police force to become "people's police" in line with the vision of Sheikh Mujibur Rahman. He also inaugurated a police sub-control room at Modern Mour Intersection to facilitate the safe travel.

=== Forced Retirement ===
On 13 August 2024, the Ministry of Home Affairs sent Moniruzzaman and Md. Abdul Baten, DIG of Rangpur range, was forced into retirement after the fall of the Sheikh Hasina-led Awami League government. At the time, he was serving as Commissioner of Rangpur Metropolitan Police when Begum Rokeya University student Abu Sayeed was killed in police firing during the quota reform movement on 16 July 2024.
