= Naria Upazila =

Naria নড়িয়া
- Upazila
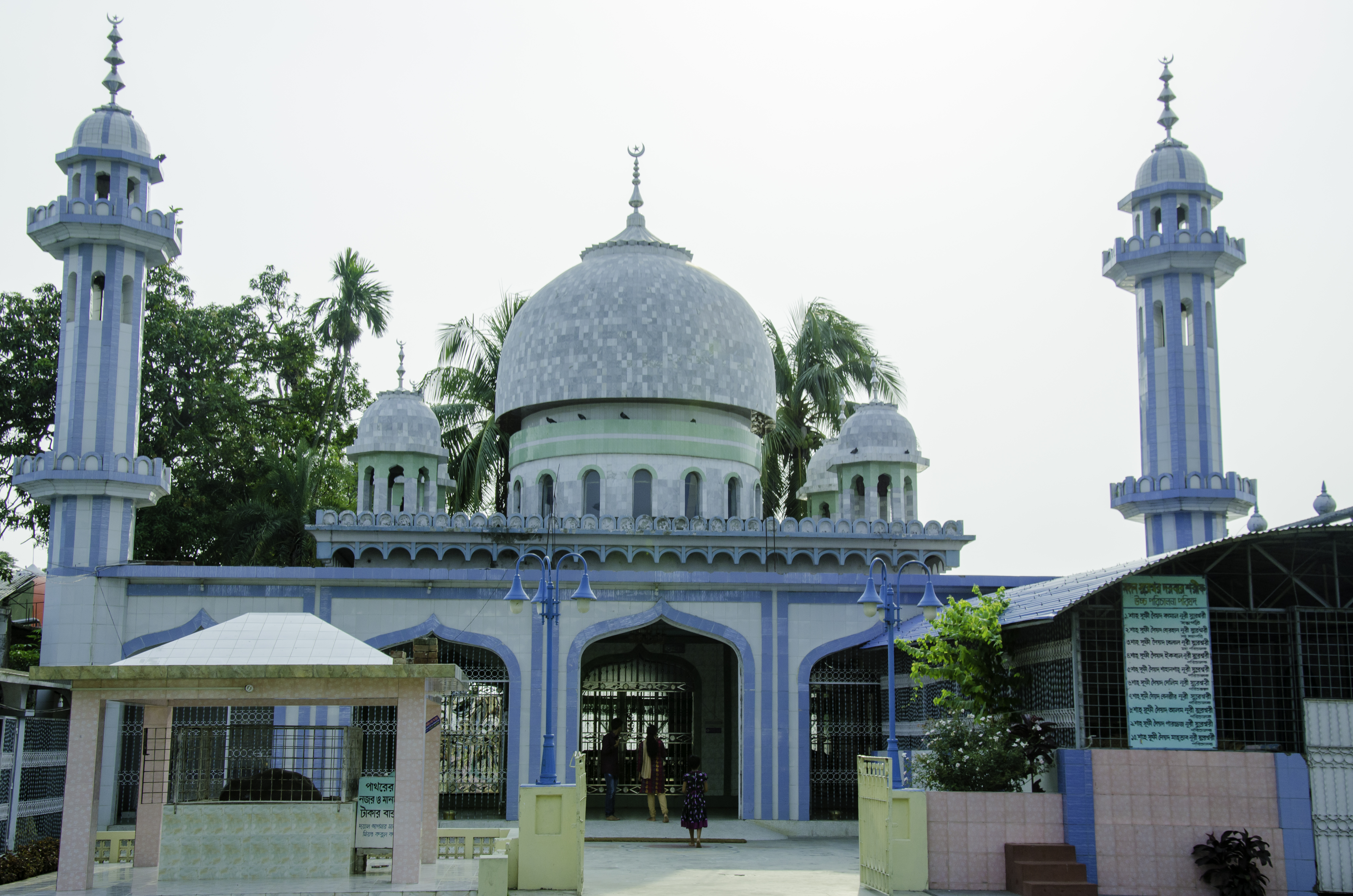
- Sureshwar Darbar Sharif

- Coordinates: 23°18′N 90°24′E
- Country: Bangladesh
- Division: Dhaka
- District: Shariatpur
- Thana: 1930
- Upazila: 1983

Government
  - Upazila Chairman: AKM Ismail Haq Narkalikati

Area
  - Total: 203.58 km^{2} (78.60 sq mi)

Population (2022)
  - Total: 260,240
  - Density: 1,278.3/km^{2} (3,310.8/sq mi)
- Time zone: UTC+6 (BST)
- Postal code: 8020
- Area code: 0601
- Website: naria.shariatpur.gov.bd(in Bengali)

Naria Upazila mauza geocode map

Naria (Bengali: নড়িয়া) is an upazila of Shariatpur District of the Dhaka Division of Bangladesh. It is named after its administrative centre, the town of Naria.

== History ==
Naria was historically a part of the Idilpur division of the Chandradwip kingdom based in nearby Barisal. By the 15th century, the area was under the rule of Baro-Bhuiyan chieftain Kedar Ray whose capital was in nearby Bikrampur. When the Mughal subahdar of Bengal Man Singh I went to attack Bikrampur, his allies had been defeated by Kedar Ray and took refuge in a place called Srinagar in present-day Naria. Mansingh sent an army to rescue the allies and a fierce battle took place leading to the wounding of Kedar Ray and his eventual death. Srinagar was then renamed to Fatehjangpur (city of war victory) as a sign of victory. Today, there is also a place called Kedarpur in Naria which was supposedly a new city which Kedar Ray was planning to develop but was unable to because of his death. The ruins of the trench he was digging around the house still exist is called the Fence (Ber) of Kedar Ray's residence.

Naria was established as a thana in 1930 and incorporated into the Madaripur Mahakuma (subdivision) of the District of Faridpur. Notable zamindars in the area included the family of Alhaj Ghiyasuddin Ahmad Chowdhury (former member of the National Assembly of Pakistan), Abdul Aziz Munshi(Khan Saheb) and Mezbah Uddin Chowdhury.

During the Bangladesh Liberation War of 1971, Yunus Ali Khan Mitali was the Mukti Bahini area commander for the Naria and Palang thanas and later Master Didarul Islam took this role. SM Kamal Uddin Mantu was also a notable commander based in Naria. The Mujib Bahini representatives for Naria were Lieutenant Colonel Alamgir Hawladar, Mizanur Rahman Rari Babul and Shafiqur Rahman Bacchu. On 22 May, a young girl named Nasimah Akhtar, who lived in Mumin Ali Bepari's house, was burned alive by the army. Many parts of Naria were set on fire by the Pakistan Army such as the house of Shahar Ali Faqir in Moktar Char and the shop of Sulayman Dhali in Naria Bazar. The shop of Khalilur Rahman Lakuria in Gharisar Bazar was burnt because his son, Abdur Rashid Lakuria, became a freedom fighter. A Hindu businessman's store was also burnt down because it contained a portrait of Sheikh Mujib. Abdul Hamid Sardar of Bhojeshwar was killed whilst fighting the army. On 22 June, Mitali alongside Mantu, Rawshan Ali and James Babul planned an attack. Naria was liberated on 23 June. On that day, the freedom fighters planned an attack in the house of Ali Ahammed Munshi, the president of the Shanti Committee's Naria branch and chairman of the Naria union, to recover the wireless set. Hafiz Abdur Rashid, Mitali and Abdul Jalil were posted in the Naria police station at night. Dr Kanchon was given the task of attacking Ali's house and James Babul with recovering the wireless set. The freedom fighters camped southeast and west of the police station. They attacked their respective targets and at the same time and asked them to surrender. Refusing to do so, a battle emerged. 7-8 Razakars were murdered and the freedom fighters looted 7 rifles and 350 round bullets. Abdul Jalil and Hafiz Abdur Rashid were killed in this battle. Dr Kanchon's group successfully attacked Munshi's house and killed him along with two others, thus the freedom fighters took control of the house too.

Naria Thana was converted into an upazila in 1983 and then incorporated into the newly founded Shariatpur District, which comprised the former parts of eastern Madaripur.

== Geography ==
Naria Upazila has a total area of 203.58 square kilometres (78.60 sq mi). It borders Zajira Upazila to the west and north, Munshiganj District to the north, Bhedarganj Upazila to the east and south, and Shariatpur Sadar Upazila to the west. The Padma River flows through the northern part of the upazila and the Kirtinasha River flows through the upazila too.

== Demographics ==
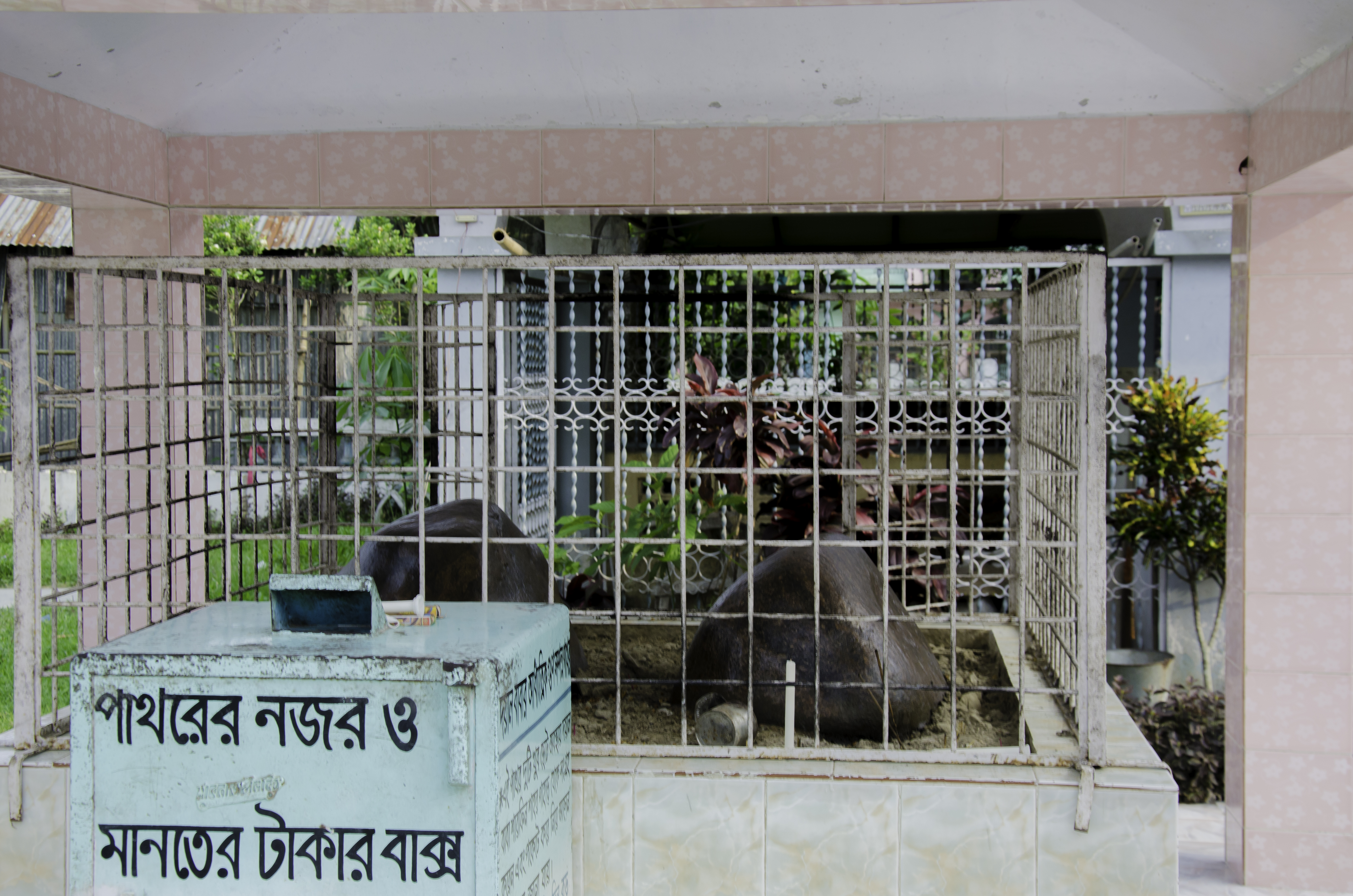
Large stones in display at the Sureswar Darbar.

Historical population
Year	Pop. (000)	±%
1981	189	—
1991	214	+13.2%
2001	225	+5.1%
2011	232	+3.1%
2022	260	+12.1%
Source: Bangladesh Bureau of Statistics

Religions in Naria Upazila (2022)
Religion	Percent
Islam	95.25%
Hinduism	4.74%
Other or not stated	0.01%

According to the 2022 Bangladeshi census, Naria Upazila had 63,134 households and a population of 260,240. 9.75% of the population were under 5 years of age. Naria had a literacy rate (age 7 and over) of 75.94%: 77.32% for males and 74.72% for females, and a sex ratio of 90.38 males for every 100 females. 52,925 (20.34%) lived in urban areas.

According to the 2011 Census of Bangladesh, Naria Upazila had 49,615 households and a population of 231,644. 54,654 (23.59%) were under 10 years of age. Naria had a literacy rate (age 7 and over) of 50.8%, compared to the national average of 51.8%, and a sex ratio of 1106 females per 1000 males. 22,773 (9.83%) lived in urban areas.

== Administration ==
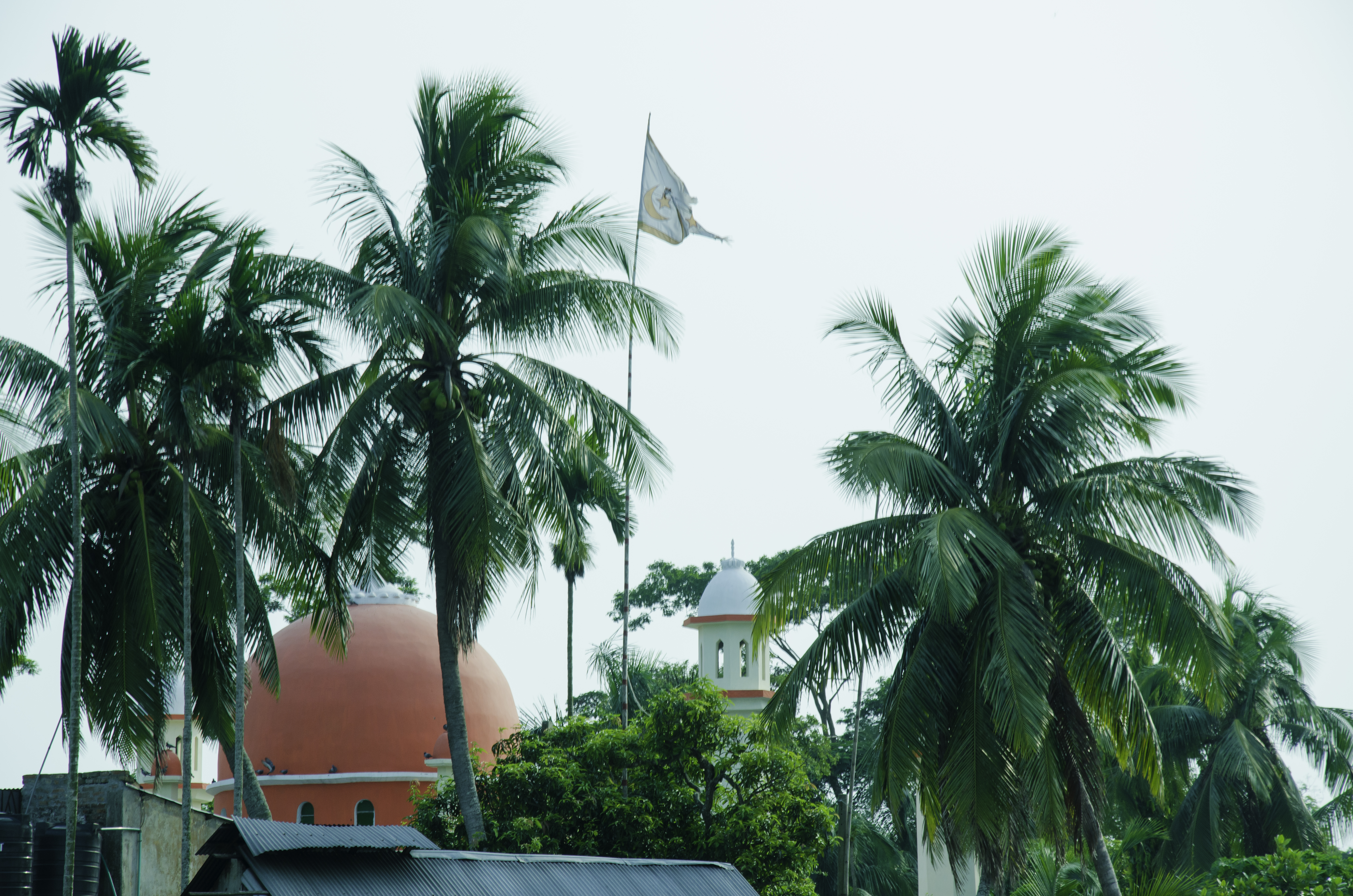

Naria, formed as Thana in 1930, was turned into an upazila in 1983.

Naria Upazila is divided into Naria Municipality and 14 union parishads: Bhojeshwar, Bhumkhara, Bijhari, Chamta, Char Atra, Dingamanik, Fateh Jangapur, Gharisar, Japsa, Kedarpur, Muktarer Char, Nasason, Noapara, and Rajnagar. The union parishads are subdivided into 146 mauzas and 189 villages.

Naria Municipality is subdivided into 9 wards and 27 mahallas.

=== Upazila chairmen ===
List of chairmen
Name	Term
Munshi Azizul Haque	1983-1990
Sultan Mahmud Shiman	1990-1993
Haji Abdul Wahhab Bepari	2009-2014
AKM Ismail Haq Narkalikati	Present

== Education ==
There are three degree colleges in the upazila. Naria Government College, Bhojeswar Upashi Govt College, Panditsar T.M Giasuddin College. The other popular and well known educational Institutions of the upazila are: Naria Govt. BL High School, Kartikpur High School & College. Dogree Ismail Hossain High School & College, Nasason RI Senior Madrasa, Upshi Tara Prashanna High School, Shaheed Smriti College, Charatra Azizia High School & College, Kedarpur High School, Lonsing High School, Uttar Japsha Dakhil Madrasa, Mohishkhola High School, Shaheed Abdus Samad High School, Panchapalli High School, 78 Kathugli Government Primary School. Swarnakhola Government Primary School, and Mazid Jarina Foundation School & College. ( Pioneer of the Modern Education of Shariatpur).

The madrasa education system includes one Fazil madrasa which is the Mulfatganj Azizia Jalalia Fazil Madrasa.

== Economy and tourism ==
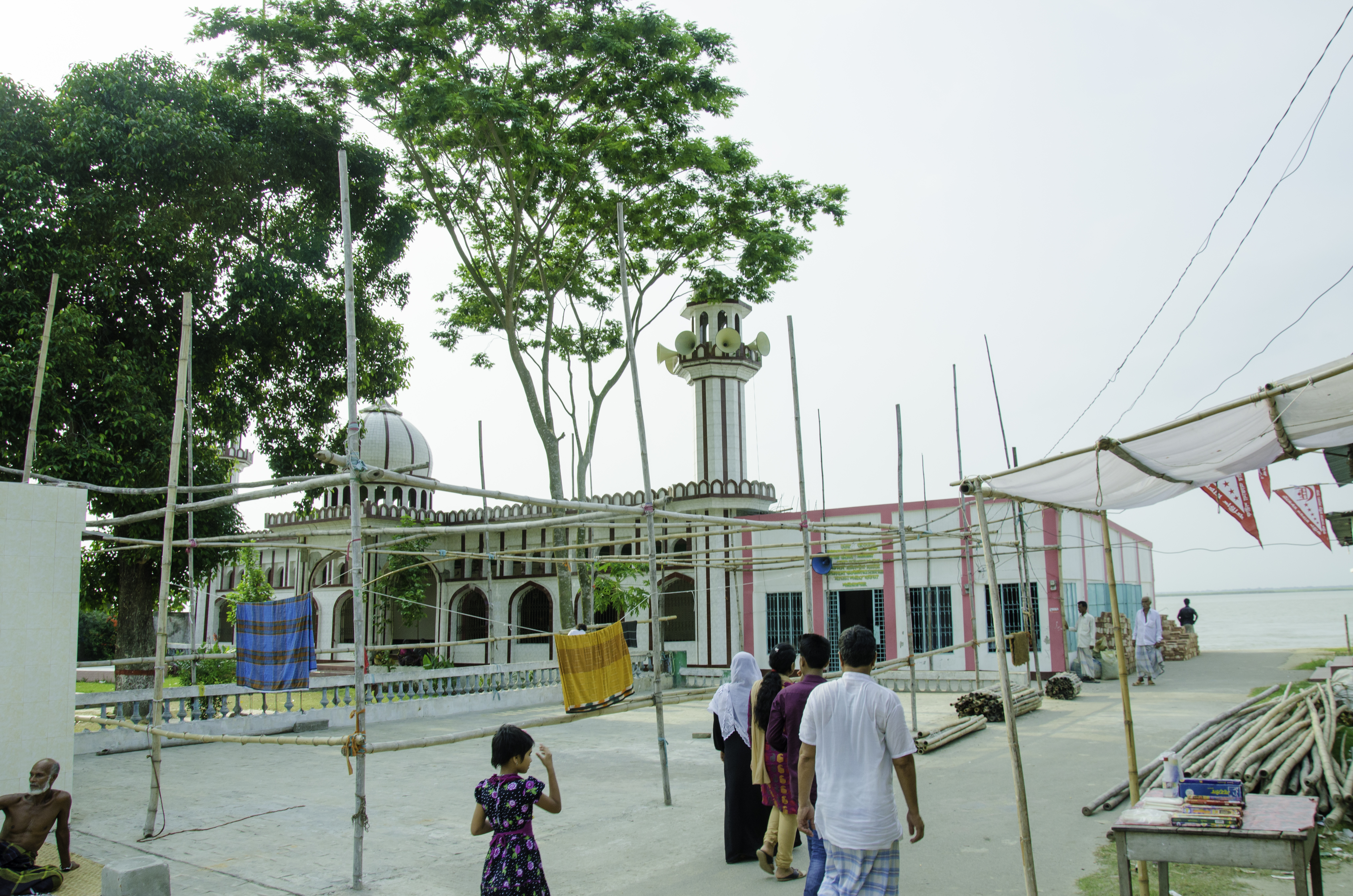
Sureswar Darbar courtyard with mosque at the back

Bhojeshwar and Gharishar are the commercial centres of Naria. From there, jute, wheat and rice are transported via river to other parts of Bangladesh as well as Kolkata. Steamers and launches used to travel from Kartikpur Launchghat and Sureswar Ghat too. Other than those mentioned, Nariya Bazar and Ganj Bazar are also major trading centres of Naria Upazila. River business is common in Wapda Ghat and Chandipur Ghat too.

The Naria upazila is home to 575 mosques. Notable sites include the Sureswar Darbar Sharif; which contains the mazar (mausoleum) of Jan Sharif, the Chishtinagar Mazar in Panditsar; which contains the mausoleum of Syed Ghulam Husayni Chishti Shyampuri Huzur and the Kedarpur Dargah which contains the dargah of Majid Shah. The fort at Fatehjangpur is also a popular tourist attraction. The Modern Fantasy Kingdom has the country's largest big fish aquarium and is located in Kalukathi, Kedarpur Union. It also has a zoo and Shariatpur District's only amusement park.

The Naria Barta is a local newspaper. It is based in the Haji Supermarket in Upazila Square.

== Facilities ==
Naria is home to a number of orphanages which take care of orphan children:

- Barashalghar Alamin Mafizia Orphanage
- Debidwar Darul Uloom Orphanage and Hifz Centre
- Debidwar Governmental Family
- Debidwar Islamia Orphanage
- Gunaighar Alhaj Shah Sufi Ibrahim Orphanage and Lillah Boarding
- Nabipur Hafizia Orphanage and Lillah Boarding
- Rampur Islamia Qasimul Uloom Madrasa and Orphanage
- Wahidpur Model Hafizia Madrasa and Orphanage

== Notable people ==
- Golam Mawla, language movement activist
- Abdul Haque Faridi, educator at Chittagong College, lecturer, writer, Winner of Bangla Academy Award
- Abu Ishaque, novelist
- A. K. M. Shahidul Haque, inspector general of Bangladesh Police (2015−2018)
- Shawkat Ali, former deputy speaker of the Jatiya Sangsad
- Gopal Chandra Bhattacharya, entomologist
- Gostha Pal, footballer and first captain of India national football team
- Kedar Ray, medieval Hindu chieftain
- Pulin Behari Das, Indian revolutionary

== See also ==
- Upazilas of Bangladesh
- Districts of Bangladesh
