= Dingamanik =

Dingamanik ডিঙ্গামানিক ডিঙ্গামানিক
- Village
- Location in Bangladesh
- Coordinates: 23°09′N 90°27′E
- Country: Bangladesh
- Division: Dhaka Division
- District: Shariatpur District
- Upazila: Naria Upazila
- Time zone: UTC+6 (Bangladesh Time)

Dingamanik is a village in Naria Upazila of Shariatpur District under Dhaka Division of southern-central Bangladesh.

== Geography ==
The village is situated in the bank of a small river branch of Padma River. It is the eastern border for Naria Upazila.

== Religious importance ==
The village is home to Sri Satyanarayan Seva Mandir, a hermitage established in 1943 to mark the birthplace of the Hindu sage Ram Thakur.

== Transportation ==
Local village roads and the side by river branch is the only route for the transportation. Using waterway pilgrims either travels 5.5 kilometres (3.4 mi) to north towards Padma River or travels 8.6 kilometres (5.3 mi) to south for Bhedarganj Upazila.
