= Aftab Uddin Ahmed =

Aftab Uddin Ahmed is a Bangladeshi police officer and former additional director general of the Rapid Action Battalion. The Rapid Action Battalion jas been accused of widespread human rights abuses and extrajudicial killings. He is the former the commissioner of Sylhet Metropolitan Police.

== Career ==
As an Additional deputy inspector general, Ahmed commanded Rapid Action Battalion-12, based in Sirajganj District. In November 2009, Ahmed was promoted to deputy inspector general.

Ahmed was made the commissioner of the Sylhet Metropolitan Police in February 2010. In Sylhet, he busted a currency counterfeiting ring. He was serving at the Bangladesh Police headquarters as a Deputy Inspector General. Ahmed was appointed the additional director general of Rapid Action Battalion in October 2010. He led an internal investigation of the Rapid Action Battalion into the Seven Murders of the Narayanganj. His report confirmed the murder was committed by Rapid Action Battalion officers led by Lieutenant Colonel Tarek Sayeed Mohammad.

In March 2016, Aftab was appointed deputy inspector general of the Special Branch. Md Abdul Jalil Mandal replaced him as the additional director general of the Rapid Action Battalion.
