= Md. Abdul Baten =

Bangladeshi Police Officer

Deputy Inspector General Md. Abdul Baten
- Occupation: Police officer
- Office: Deputy Inspector General of Rangpur Range
- Police career
- Rank: Deputy Inspector General of Police

Md. Abdul Baten is a retired Deputy Inspector General of Bangladesh Police. He served as an additional commissioner of the Detective Branch.

== Career ==
When Baten was serving as the Superintendent of Police of Rangamati, 132 homes were burned down in the area in an arson attack on 22 April 2008. He was the Deputy Commissioner of Dhaka Metropolitan Police, in charge of the Ramna Division, in 2015. He was then transferred to the Detective Branch. He was promoted to Deputy Inspector General of Police in 2018.

In 2019, Baten was an additional commissioner of the Detective Branch. He detained Regent Group Chairman Md Shahed for making fake vaccine certificates during the COVID-19 pandemic in Bangladesh. In November 2020, four Islamist extremists were detained by Detective Branch officers serving under his command in Sherpur Upazila, Bogura District.

Baten held the post of Deputy Inspector General of Rangpur Range when Begum Rokeya University student Abu Sayed was killed in police firing during the quota reform movement. After the fall of the Sheikh Hasina-led Awami League government, the Ministry of Home Affairs sent him into retirement, along with Md. Moniruzzaman, under Section 45 of the Public Service Act, 2018. In September 2024, the Anti-Corruption Commission began an investigation against him. He was made an accused in the case over the murder of Abu Sayeed.

In July 2025, a court in Dhaka issued a travel ban on Baten and his wife following a petition by the Anti-Corruption Commission, which was investigating him. Judge Md Zakir Hossain Galib ordered the government also to block his and his wife's National Identity Cards.

== Personal life ==
Baten is married to Nurjahan Akhtar Hira.
