= Md. Abdul Jalil Mandal =

Md. Abdul Jalil Mandal BPM
- Born: April 1957 (age 69); Pabna, Bangladesh
- Education: Jagannath University
- Occupation: Police officer
- Years active: 1988–2017
- Employer: Bangladesh Police
- Known for: Commissioner, Chittagong Metropolitan Police
- Spouse: Shahida Begum
- Awards: Bangladesh Police Medal (2013)

Md. Abdul Jalil Mondal (born April 1957) is a retired Bangladeshi police officer and veteran of the Bangladesh Liberation War. He was the Commissioner of the Chittagong Metropolitan Police. He is the former Additional Director General of the Rapid Action Battalion.

== Early life and education ==
Mandal was born in April 1957 in Pabna District, East Pakistan. He completed his bachelor's in philosophy from Jagannath University. He later earned a Master of Arts and Bachelor of Laws from the same institution.

== Career ==
During the Bangladesh Liberation War of 1971, Mondal was a Mukti Bahini member and fought in Dinajpur, Joypurhat, and Naogaon.

Mondal joined the Bangladesh Police through the 7th Bangladesh Civil Service exam in 1988. He served as Superintendent of Police in Nilphamari District, Bagerhat District, and Joypurhat District. Also, he held the role of Superintendent of Police (Administration) at the Bangladesh Police Academy. His international experience includes serving in the United Nations Protection Force in Yugoslavia and the United Nations Interim Administration Mission in Kosovo. In addition to field-level policing, he has worked with several specialized branches, including the Criminal Investigation Department, Special Branch, and at the Police Headquarters as Assistant Inspector General.

Mondal has also served as Deputy Police Commissioner in the Khulna Metropolitan Police and later took on the role of Additional Police Commissioner in both the Dhaka Metropolitan Police and the Chittagong Metropolitan Police. In July 2010, he was withdrawn from the Chittagong Metropolitan Police without an explanation.

In September 2014, Mandal was appointed Commissioner of Chittagong Metropolitan Police. Md Shamsuddin, commissioner of the Barisal Metropolitan Police, replaced Jail as Additional Police Commissioner of the Dhaka Metropolitan Police. He transferred the officer-in-charge of Khulshi Police Station Mainul Islam Bhuiyan following a request from the returning officer of the Bangladesh Election Commission for favouring the Awami League candidate. He recovered nearly 30 million taka stolen from Group Four Security in Chittagong. A probe body formed by the Inspector General of Police AKM Shahidul Huq found Mandal and six other police officers, including Prodip Kumar Das, guilty of harassing a notable businessman. In March 2016, he was appointed Additional Director General of the Rapid Action Battalion. He replaced Aftab Uddin Ahmed, who was appointed Deputy Inspector General of the Special Branch. Md Iqbal Bahar was appointed Commissioner of Chittagong Metropolitan Police replacing Mandal.

After retirement, Mandal expressed support for the Awami League ahead of the 2018 general election.

== Personal life ==
Mandal is married to Shahida Begum. They have two sons. He is an active member of the Quantum Foundation, a non-profit organization.
