= Airport Thana =

Thana in Barisal, Bangladesh

Coordinates: 22.783333°N 90.3°E

Airport Thana is an administrative area of Barisal City Corporation formed in 2010. It has a total population of 166,870 people. It takes its name from Barisal Airport located inside the area. The area has an average literacy rate of 73.27% and contains Barisal Cadet College.

== History ==
Airport Thana, Barisal was established in June 2010.

== Administration ==
Airport Thana is a administrative region and consists of 4 wards and 5 union councils, they are:

- Kashipur Union
- Chandpasha Union
- Madhabpasha Union
- Rahmatpur Union
- Roypasha Karapur Union
