= 1988 Chittagong massacre =

Coordinates: 22.333756°N 91.837396°E

Chittagong massacre refers to a massacre of opposition activists in Chittagong on January 24 of 1988. The activists of Awami League who were rallying in the streets of Chittagong that day were attacked by the police during the regime of autocratic ruler Hussain Muhammad Ershad. The then Chittagong Metropolitan Police Commissioner Mirza Rakibul Huda ordered the police to open fire on the rally that left at least 24 people dead.

The official statement from the government estimated that nine people were killed that day. On the other hand, Sheikh Hasina the chief of Bangladesh Awami League claimed that 33 of its activists were shot dead in that massacre.

== Background ==
Hussain Muhammad Ershad, the Chief of Staff of Bangladesh Army in 1982, forced Justice Abdus Sattar, the elected President of People's Republic of Bangladesh in 1982, to resign from his office on March 24 of 1982. Ershad took over the power as the Chief Martial Law Administrator of Bangladesh and suspended the constitution that day. He turned into the de facto ruler of Bangladesh.

Hussain Muhammad Ershad held an election on May 7 of 1986. Initially, Bangladesh Awami League declared the election an illegal one and Ershad was an autocratic ruler. In her March 17 rally of 1986 at Laldighi of Chittagong, Sheikh Hasina said:

We have no plan to participate in the upcoming poll. Those who will participate in this poll will be declared 'national betrayer'.

But eventually, Bangladesh Awami League participated in the election on May 7 and lost to Ershad's Bangladesh Jatiya Party. Sheikh Hasina managed to win in three constituencies. Later on October 15 of the same year, Ershad was elected as the President of Bangladesh through a manipulated election.

Enraged Bangladesh Awami League later on August 29, 1987, refused to hold any talk with Ershad and locked itself in several clashes with the government. On November 10 of 1987, the police in Dhaka opened fire on the opposition activists leaving Bangladesh Awami League activist Nur Hossain dead. The incident added fuel to the fire and compelled Ershad to suspend the parliament on December 6, 1987.

Ershad in 1988 declared to hold an election on March 4 to legitimize his rule. Bangladesh Nationalist Party led Seven Party Alliance, Awami League led the Eight Party Alliance and the leftist Five Party Alliance who were on the streets against the autocratic rule of Ershad decided to boycott the election and were holding frequent rallies to foil the election.

== Events ==
On January 24 of 1988, Sheikh Hasina with a couple of Awami League bigwigs arrived the second largest city of Bangladesh, Chittagong in morning.

Later she spoke in a public gathering organized by Chittagong metropolitan Awami League at Laldighi of the city in front of a large crowd. After the meeting Sheikh Hasina in a truck, was leading a procession in the streets of Chittagong.

Her rally was interrupted in front of Kotwali intersection of the city. Police barricaded the road in front of Kotwali Police Station. When the crowd tried to remove the barricade and move ahead, the Chittagong Metropolitan Police Commissioner Mirza Rakibul Huda ordered his force to open fire upon the crowd instantly.

The indiscriminate firing of police took the life of at least 24 people that day. Hundreds of people were injured. Sheikh Hasina escaped the attack as a number of activists surrounded her and formed a human wall around her. Amid repeated request from Sheikh Hasina to stop firing, police did not pay any heed.

The purview of the massacre were around Muslim Institute, KC Dey Road, Nandakanan, Amtola and Court Building area.

Inspector Govinda Chandra Mandal, Constable Pradeep Barua, Constable Momtazuddin, Constable Mostafizur Rahman, Constable Shah Abdullah, Constable Bashir Ahmed, Constable Abdus Salam are among others who took part and led the massacre.

== Aftermath ==
Almost five years of the massacre Shahidul Huda, a lawyer, filed a murder case against 46 perpetrators including the Chittagong Metropolitan Police Commissioner Mirza Rakibul Huda in 1992.

In 1996, CID of Police were given the charge to investigate the case. CID submitted a charge sheet on 12 December 1997. A complementary charge sheet was filed on December 3 of 1998. On May 9 of 2000, the court framed charge against eight of the 46 suspects. All of them were police. Among the convicts, Inspector Govinda Chandra Mandal remained absconding since the case was filed. Other convicts were released on bail in 2003. Constable Bashir Ahmed and Constable Abdus Salam died natural death.

The families who lost their beloved in this massacre were denied justice till date. Not a single witness of the massacre attend the court proceeding from 2010 to 2015.
