= Chattogram Metropolitan Police =

Chattogram Metropolitan Police চট্টগ্রাম মেট্রোপলিটন পুলিশ
- Crest of Chattogram Metropolitan Police
- Common name: Police
- Abbreviation: CMP
- Motto: নিরাপত্তায় আস্থার ঠিকানা

Agency overview
- Formed: 30 November 1978
- Employees: 6,458 (2025)

Jurisdictional structure
- Operations jurisdiction: Chattogram, Bangladesh
- Area: 655.74 km^{2} (253.18 sq mi)
- Population: 5,513,609 (2022)
- Governing body: Ministry of Home Affairs
- Constituting instrument: The Chattogram Metropolitan Police Ordinance, 1978
- General nature: Local civilian police

Operational structure
- Headquarters: Police Line, Dampara, Chattogram
- Police officers: 150
- Minister responsible: Salahuddin Ahmed, Minister of Home Affairs
- Agency executive: DIG Hasan Md. Shawkat Ali, Police Commissioner
- Parent agency: Bangladesh Police
- Special units: City Special Branch; Detective Branch; Crisis Response Team

Facilities
- Stations: 16
- Armored vehicles: Otokar Cobra, IAG Guardian
- Helicopters: Bell 407

Website
- cmp.gov.bd
- Service uniform: Yankees Blue, Light French Beige Combat uniform: Tiffany Blue, Khaki

The Chattogram Metropolitan Police (Bengali: চট্টগ্রাম মেট্রোপলিটন পুলিশ, romanized: Choṭṭogrām mēṭrōpaliṭana puliśa; abbreviated as CMP) is the primary metropolitan unit of the Bangladesh Police responsible for law enforcement, public safety, and crime prevention within the metropolis of Chattogram, the second-largest city in Bangladesh. Established in 1978 under the Chittagong Metropolitan Police Ordinance, CMP oversees policing operations, administration, and coordination with other law enforcement and emergency agencies in the city. The force is headed by a Police Commissioner who manages all operational and administrative functions.

== History ==
The Chittagong Metropolitan Police was established on 30 November 1978 with M. M. Sharif Ali as its first commissioner. It has six police stations at the beginning with 3238 personnel.

On 24 January 1988, Chittagong Metropolitan Police Commissioner Mirza Rakibul Huda ordered police to fire at a rally of Awami League killing 24 people. It is known as the 1988 Chittagong massacre.

Mobassher, a member of Bangladesh Ansar, stationed in Chandgaon Police Station, was arrested for the rape of a 7-year-old girl in May 2012.

In May 2016, the Chittagong Metropolitan Police banned people from putting stickers in their car mentioning their professions.

Commissioner Mahbubur Rahman of the Chattogram Metropolitan Police told the media on 5 September 2018 that extrajudicial killings of drug dealers are necessary for peace. From May—September 2018, 10 drug dealers were killed by the police under his command. In November, the Chattogram Metropolitan Police got their first counter-terrorist unit.

In June 2020, the Chattogram Metropolitan Police established a 100-bed CMP-Bidyanondo Field Hospital in collaboration with Bidyanondo Foundation. During the COVID-19 pandemic in Bangladesh, Kotwali police station under Chattogram Metropolitan Police started providing home delivery of medicine. In August 2020, eight members of Chattogram Metropolitan Police were sued for allegedly implicating four people in a narcotics case in an attempt to extort money. The complaint was filed with Additional Metropolitan Magistrate Mohiuddin Murad.

Two police constables of the Chattogram Metropolitan Police disappeared while training in the Netherlands in May 2022. They had decided to stay in the country and deserted. In August, three constables were withdrawn after video of them confining and torturing children went viral.

== Police stations ==
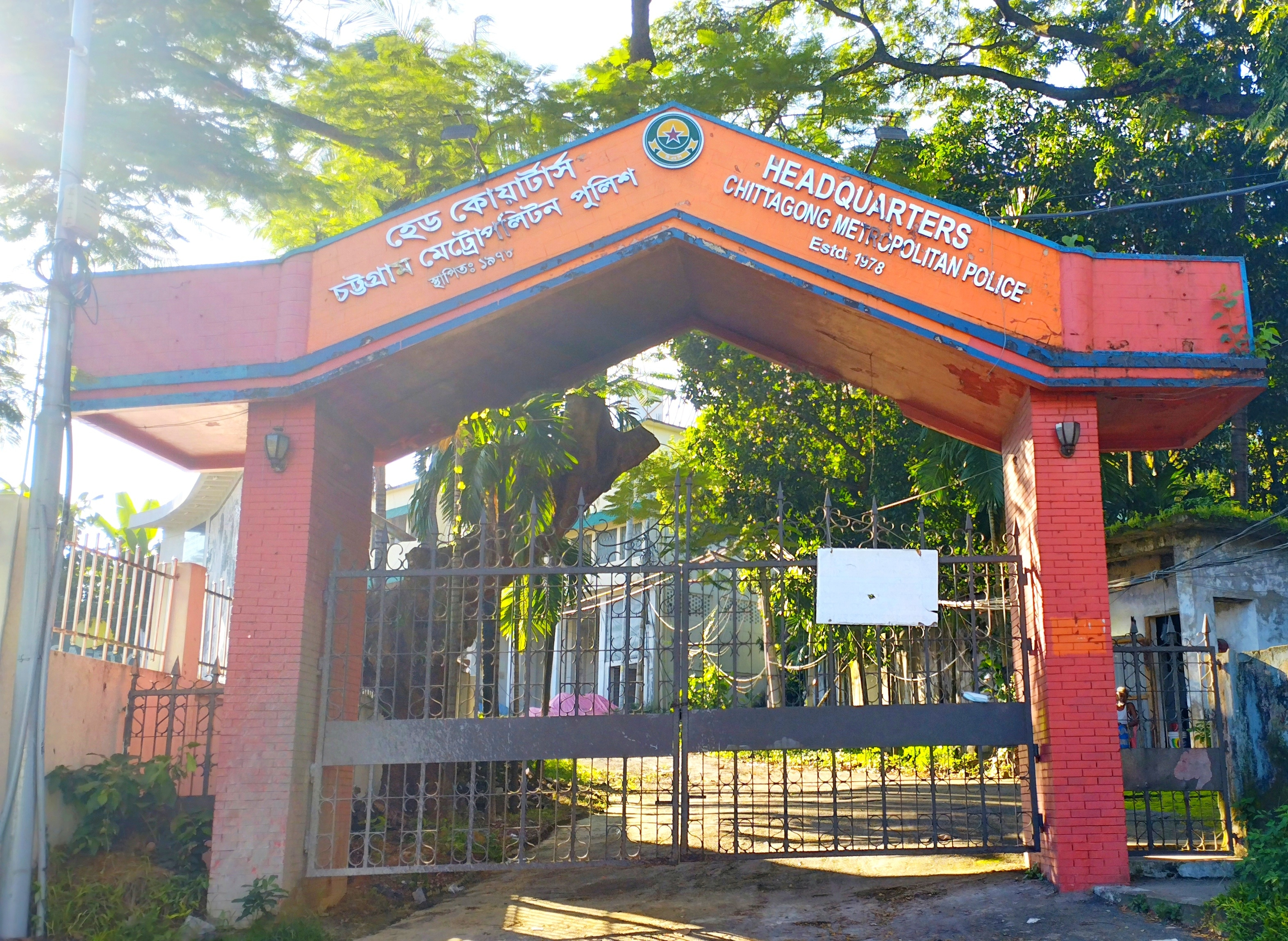
gate of headquarters

There are currently 16 police stations operating under CMP.

1. Akbarshah
2. Bakoliya
3. Bandar
4. Bayazid
5. Chandgaon
6. Double Mooring
7. Halishahar
8. Khulshi
9. Kotwali
10. Pahartali
11. Panchlaish
12. Patenga
13. Chawkbazar
14. Sadarghat
15. EPZ
16. Karnaphuli

== Police commissioners ==
No.	Name	Took office	Left office	Time in office	Ref.
1	M. M. Sharif Ali	30 November 1978	27 July 1980	1 year, 240 days	
2	A. H. M. B. Zaman	31 July 1980	2 April 1982	1 year, 245 days	
3	M. Azizul Haque	3 April 1982	4 July 1982	92 days	
4	Golam Morshed	5 July 1982	25 April 1983	294 days	
5	Kazi Golam Rahman	25 April 1983	17 April 1985	1 year, 357 days	
6	A. F. Kabir	17 April 1985	6 April 1987	1 year, 354 days	
7	Mirza Rakibul Huda	6 April 1987	27 April 1988	1 year, 21 days	
8	M Wahidul Haque	27 April 1988	26 June 1991	3 years, 60 days	
9	AFM Mahmoud-Al Farid	1 July 1991	20 December 1991	172 days	
10	Mohammad Abdus Salam	20 December 1991	21 March 1993	1 year, 91 days	
11	Osman Ali Khan, BPM	23 March 1993	20 November 1994	1 year, 242 days	
12	Shahudul Haque	20 November 1994	7 March 1996	1 year, 108 days	
13	Osman Ali Khan, BPM	7 March 1996	14 May 1996	68 days	
14	Modabbir Hossain Chowdhury	14 May 1996	25 May 1997	1 year, 11 days	
15	Md. Ashraful Huda	9 June 1997	25 September 1998	1 year, 108 days	
16	Qutbur Rahman, PPM	25 January 1998	10 January 1999	350 days	
17	Ahmadul Haque Chowdhury	10 January 1999	26 July 2001	2 years, 197 days	
18	Md. Shahidullah Khan	26 July 2001	26 August 2003	2 years, 31 days	
19	S. M. Sabbir Ali	26 August 2003	2 June 2004	281 days	
20	Md. Amjad Hossain	2 June 2004	17 May 2005	349 days	
21	Mohammad Majedul Haque	17 May 2005	3 November 2006	1 year, 170 days	
22	Md. Mainur Rahman Chowdhury	3 November 2006	17 December 2007	1 year, 44 days	
23	M Akbar Ali, BPM, PPM	14 December 2007	28 August 2008	258 days	
24	Md. Moniruzzaman	3 September 2008	10 July 2010	1 year, 310 days	
25	Mohammad Abul Kashem	10 July 2010	2 May 2012	1 year, 297 days	
26	Md. Shafiqul Islam	2 May 2012	27 August 2014	2 years, 117 days	
27	Md. Abdul Jalil Mandal	27 August 2014	10 April 2016	1 year, 227 days	
28	Md. Iqbal Bahar	10 April 2016	7 June 2018	2 years, 58 days	
29	Md. Mahabubur Rahman	12 June 2018	8 September 2020	2 years, 88 days	
30	Saleh Mohammad Tanveer	8 September 2020	18 July 2022	1 year, 313 days	
31	Krishna Pada Roy	18 July 2022	3 July 2024	1 year, 351 days	
32	Md. Saiful Islam	3 July 2024	3 August 2024	31 days	
33	Hasib Aziz	3 September 2024	1 March 2026	1 year, 210 days	
34	Hasan Md. Shawkat Ali	2 March 2026	Present	226 days	
