= MRT Police =

Bangladeshi law enforcement agency

Mass Rapid Transit Police ম্যাস র‍্যাপিড ট্রানজিট পুলিশ
- Abbreviation: MRT Police

Agency overview
- Formed: May, 2023

Jurisdictional structure
- Operations jurisdiction: Bangladesh
- General nature: Civilian police

Operational structure
- Headquarters: Diabari Depot, Uttara, Dhaka
- Parent agency: Bangladesh Police

The MRT Police (Mass Rapid Transit Police; Bengali: ম্যাস র‍্যাপিড ট্রানজিট পুলিশ) is a specialized police unit in Bangladesh responsible for providing security for the Dhaka Metro Rail system. It operates as a wing under Police Headquarters and is responsible for the security of passengers infrastructure and facilities of the Dhaka Metro Rail system.

== History ==
The Dhaka Metro Rail, Bangladeshi first metro rail service was inaugurated on 28 December 2022 with the opening of a section of MRT Line 6 between Uttara North and Agargaon. On 24 May 2023, the government approved the formation of a dedicated Mass Rapid Transit police unit to provide security for the metro rail system. MRT Police began taking over security duties at metro stations on 9 October 2023, with its initial responsibilities focused on the security of passengers and stations.

The transfer of security duties was carried out in stages, with MRT Police taking charge of Uttara North, Uttara Centre and Uttara South stations on 9 October 2023, followed by Agargaon, Shewrapara and Kazipara stations on 13 October.

End of October 2023, the unit was operating under the supervision of Police Headquarters, with a deputy inspector general serving as its head. At the time, its main duties were the security of passengers and metro stations.

Although the MRT Police had initially been proposed as a separate police unit, it was operating as a wing of Police Headquarters by November 2023.

The unit faced staffing and administrative difficulties during its early operations. In October 2023, MRT Police Superintendent Shafiqul Islam said that the unit did not have the authority to register criminal cases or conduct investigations, with such matters remaining under the jurisdiction of local police stations. In November 2023, the unit's deputy inspector general, Jehadul Kabir, said that a further application had been submitted to the Ministry of Home Affairs seeking its recognition as a separate operational unit.

During the July 2024 protests, the Mirpur 10 and Kazipara metro stations were vandalised on 19 July 2024. According to The Financial Express, four MRT Police personnel were present at the two stations during the attacks.

In March 2025, MRT Police personnel were deployed inside metro trains to provide passenger security, with two officers assigned to patrol each train.

On 17 March 2025, metro rail employees staged a work stoppage following allegations that MRT Police personnel had assaulted some of their colleagues the previous day. The protest was withdrawn after assurances from the authorities, while DMTCL managing director Faruque Ahmed said action had been taken against some police personnel and further steps would follow an investigation.

In August 2026, 50 Armed Police Battalion personnel were deployed at ten metro stations following a request for additional security personnel. MRT Police Inspector Sohel Chowdhury told The Daily Star that the existing force did not have sufficient personnel to provide adequate security at the stations.

In October 2026, Deputy Inspector General Mohammad Hasan Bari Noor was transferred from the Criminal Investigation Department to the MRT Police as part of a reshuffle of senior police officers.
