= K. Sabeel Rahman =

American legal scholar

K. Sabeel Rahman is an American professor and author who is a professor of law at Cornell Law School. He served an associate administrator of the Office of Information and Regulatory Affairs from 2021 to 2023. Prior to joining the Biden administration, he served as president of the liberal think tank Demos from 2018 to 2021.

== Education ==
Rahman studied at Harvard University, receiving his bachelor's degree (B.A.), Juris Doctor (J.D.), and Ph.D degree in political theory. Additionally, he attended the University of Oxford as a Rhodes Scholar, studying law and economic development.

== Career ==
During his career, he has held fellowships at both New America and the Roosevelt Institute and served as co-chair of the Law and Political Economy (LPE) Project. Rahman once served as an analyst within the Office of Information and Regulatory Affairs during the Obama administration, and he returned to the office as a senior counselor under President Joe Biden. He was a special advisor for economic development in New York City from 2014 to 2015 and served on the city's Rent Guidelines Board.

Rahman served as an associate professor of law at Brooklyn Law School from 2015 to 2019, and is currently on leave from the institution. The bulk of Rahman's work has focused on regulatory and administrative law, taking a neorepublican perspective on power and participatory democracy inspired by the work of John Dewey and Louis Brandeis.

Rahman is married to Noorain Khan, a director with the non-profit Ford Foundation.

== Bibliography ==
- Rahman, K. Sabeel. (2016). Democracy Against Domination. Oxford University Press. ISBN 9780190468538
- Rahman, K. Sabeel and Russon Gillman, Holly. (2019). Civic Power: Rebuilding American Democracy in an Era of Crisis. Cambridge University Press. ISBN 9781108431842
- Michael Hardt, Bonnie Honig, Elaine Kamarck, K. Sabeel Rahman, Tracey Meares, Marshall Steinbaum. (2019). The President's House Is Empty: Losing and Gaining Public Goods. MIT Press. ISBN 9781946511294
