= Central Police Hospital =

- Part of Bangladesh Police
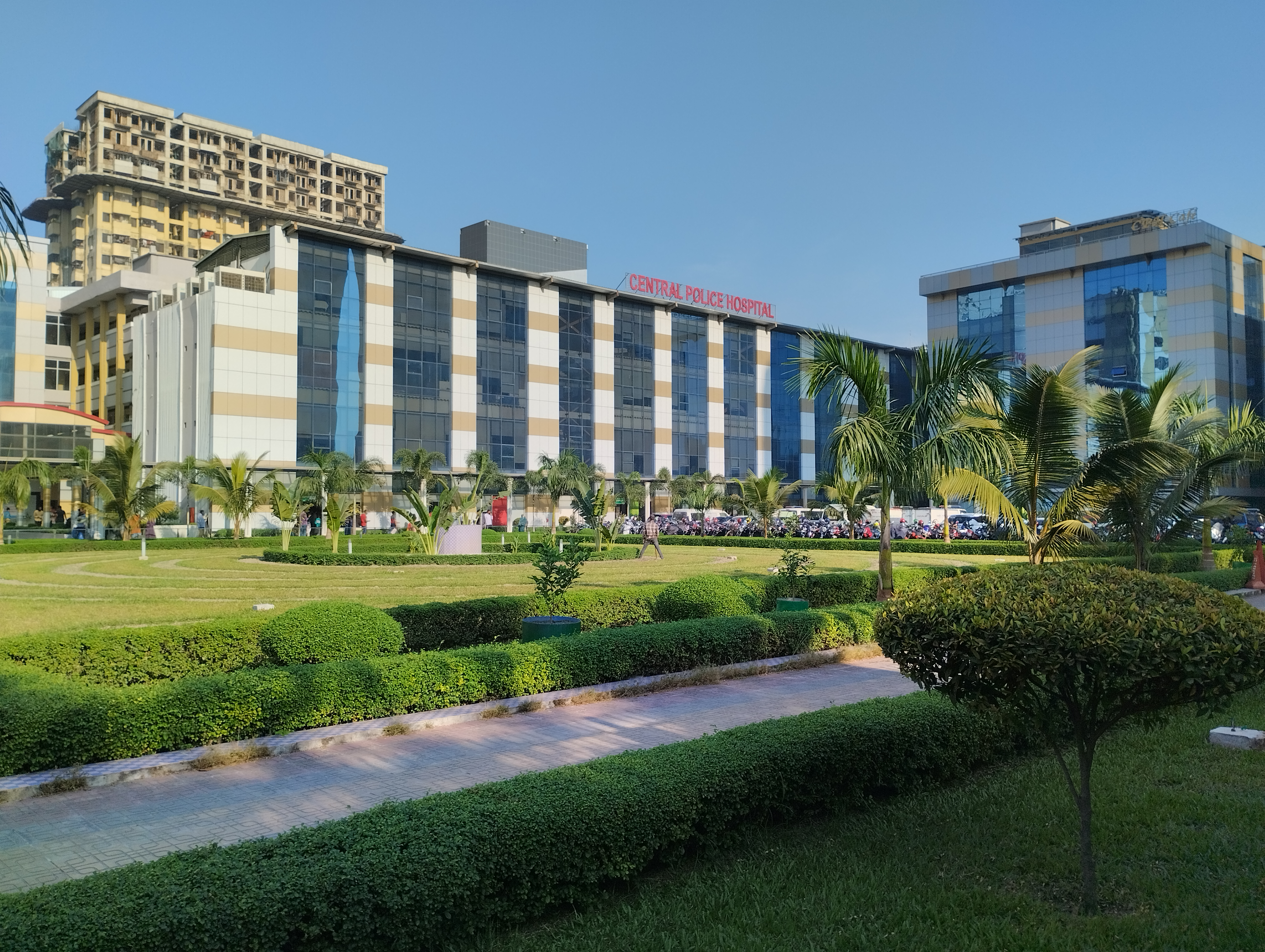

Geography
- Location: Rajarbagh Dhaka, Bangladesh
- Coordinates: 23.7357°N 90.4164°E

Services
- Beds: 500

History
- Former name: Rajarbagh Police Hospital
- Opened: 1954

Links
- Website: Official website

Central Police Hospital or CPH is a hospital located in Rajarbagh, Dhaka in Bangladesh. CPH is the largest hospital of Bangladesh Police. It was established in 1954. During IGP Benazir Ahmed's tenure this hospital has been upgraded to 500 beds and from 70 beds to 250 beds in 1997–2005. It is situated at Fakirapool More and beside the Rajarbag Police lines. DIG Sheikh Mohammad Rezaul Haider is the director of this hospital. During the COVID-19 pandemic, it played an important role by serving thousands of policemen.
