= Abdur Rahman Bakaul =

Pakistani politician (born 1919)

Abdur Rahman Bakaul (born 1919) was a Pakistani politician who was a member of the 4th National Assembly as a representative of East Pakistan.

== Life and career ==
Bakaul was born in 1919 at Faridpur. He earned his B.A. from the University of Dhaka in 1939. After several years in government service, he completed a law degree in 1950.

Bakaul joined the Pakistan Muslim League in 1963. He was elected to the 4th National Assembly of Pakistan representing Faridpur-III.
