= Detective Branch =

Unit of the Bangladesh Police

- গোয়েন্দা শাখা
- Insignia of Detective Branch

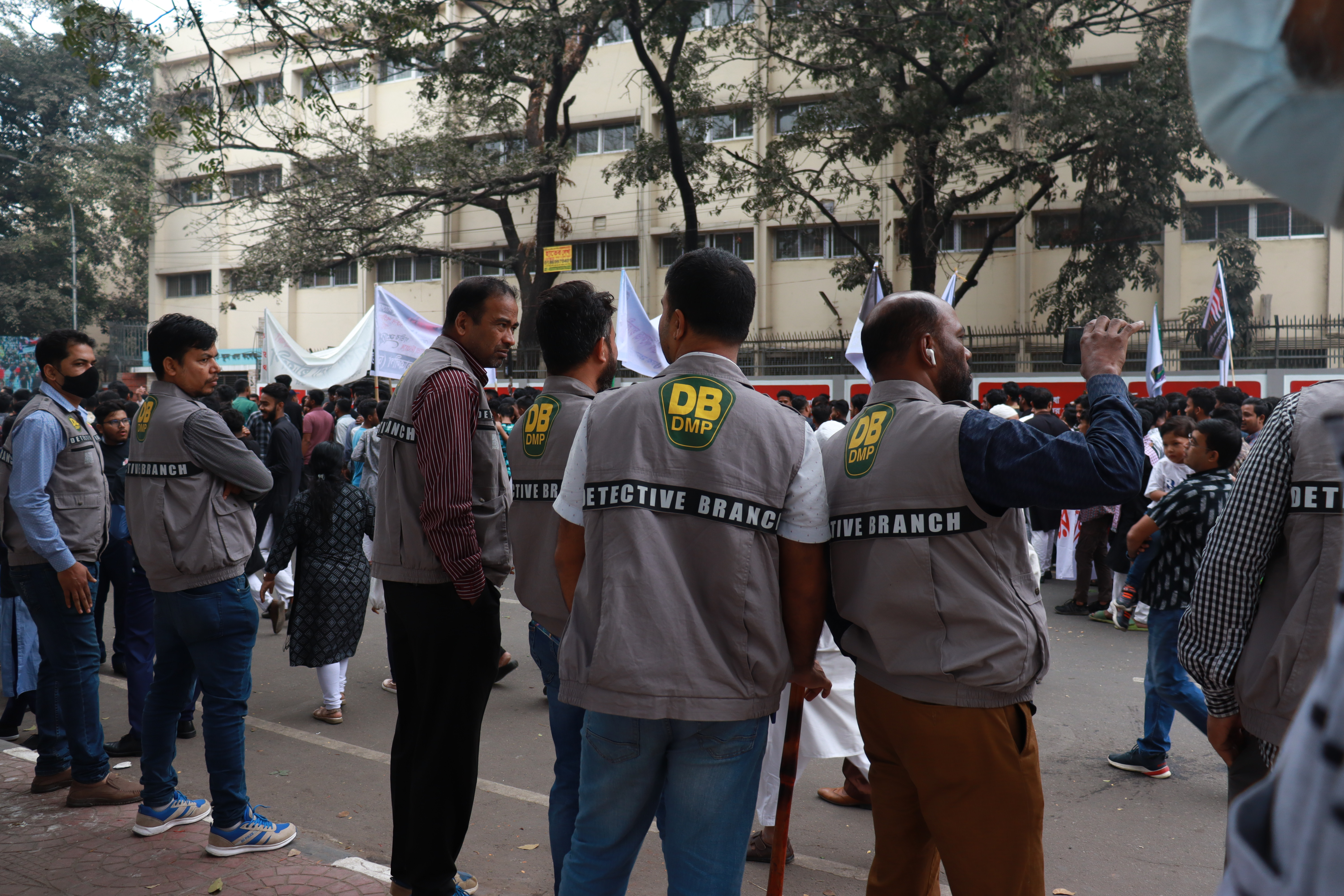
- DMP Detective Branch (DB) members on duty next to the Central Shaheed Minar in Dhaka in 2023.

Agency overview
- Formed: 1997; 29 years ago
- Type: Police intelligence
- Jurisdiction: Government of Bangladesh
- Headquarters: Minto Road, Dhaka, Bangladesh
- Employees: 34,000 personnel (about)
- Annual budget: Classified
- Parent department: District Police; DMP; CMP; KMP; RMP; SMP; BMP; GMP; RpMP
- Parent agency: Bangladesh Police

The Detective Branch (Bengali: গোয়েন্দা শাখা, romanized: Gōẏēndā Šākhā; abbreviated as DB) is a specialized unit of the Bangladesh Police. It mostly deals with investigative activities and special operations in sensitive cases and places. The main task of the detectives of this unit is to collect the information behind the news from the grass root level for the purpose of investigating the events of any serious hidden crime or unsolved historical crime. Also, if necessary, they arrest those who are suspicious individuals.

== History ==
On 1 July 2016, Intelligence Branch Assistant Commissioner Rabiul Karim was shot dead by terrorists in the July 2016 Dhaka attack.

According to Human Rights Watch, there is extensive documentation of human rights violations by the Detective Branch and the Rapid Action Battalion. According to Human Rights Watch, 70 percent of extrajudicial deaths involving the police involved the Detective Branch.

== Controversies ==
In 1998, Shamim Reza Rubel, a student of Independent University, Bangladesh, was arrested by Detective Branch members. He was then tortured and killed in custody.

On 25 March 1999, a body of an informant was recovered from the water tank of Detective Branch headquarters in Minto road in Dhaka. Munshi Atiqur Rahman was made investigation officer of the case and pressed charges against four officers of the Detective Branch. The case has been in limbo since then.

Assistant Commissioner of Detective Branch Motiur Rahman led a team that detained and tortured a businessman for the purposes of extortion in 2010.

The Detective Branch detained and tortured Rehana Yeasmin Dolly, a member of Jatiotabadi Mohila Dal, the women's wing of the Bangladesh Nationalist Party from Wari in 2012.

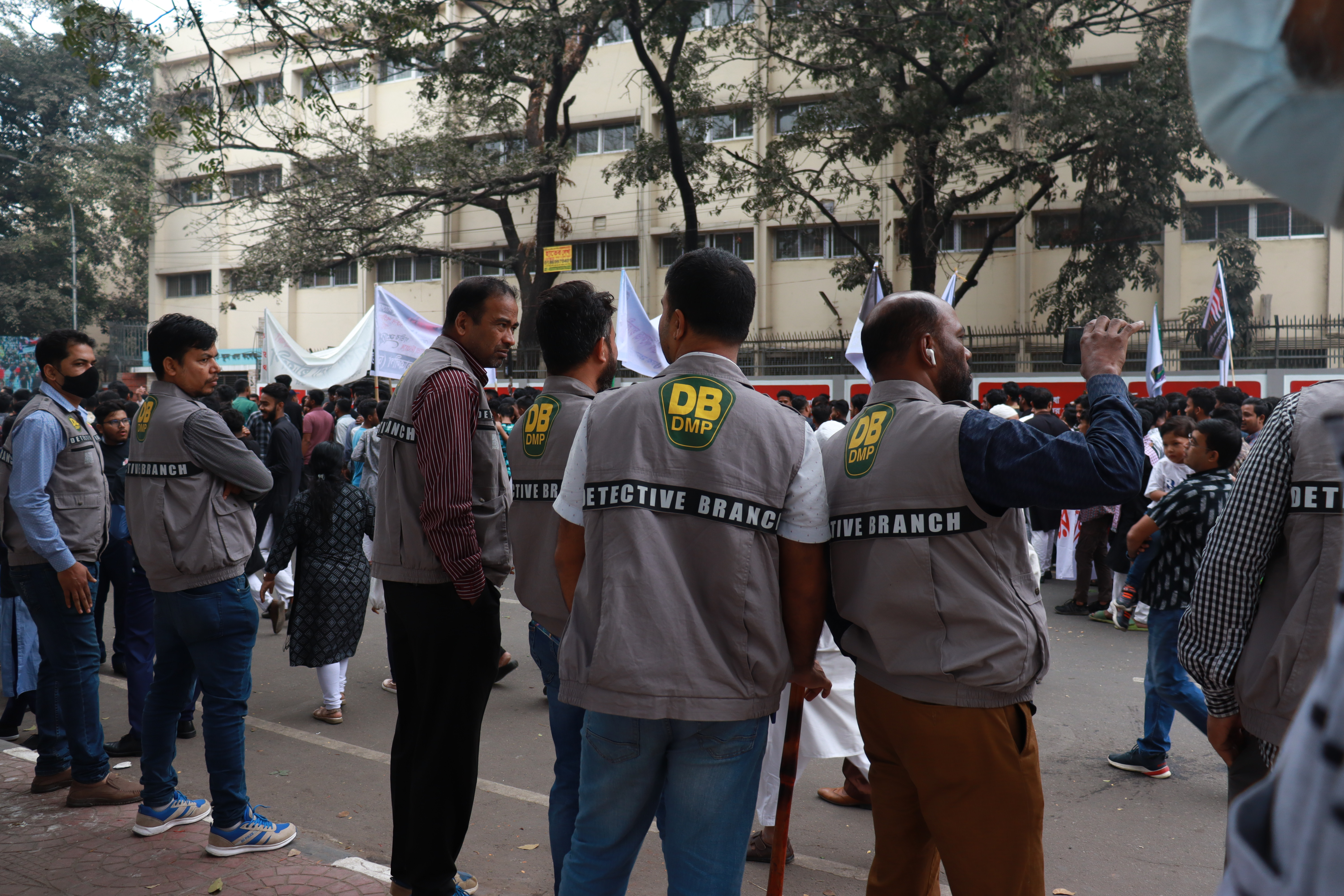
DMP DB Police members on duty

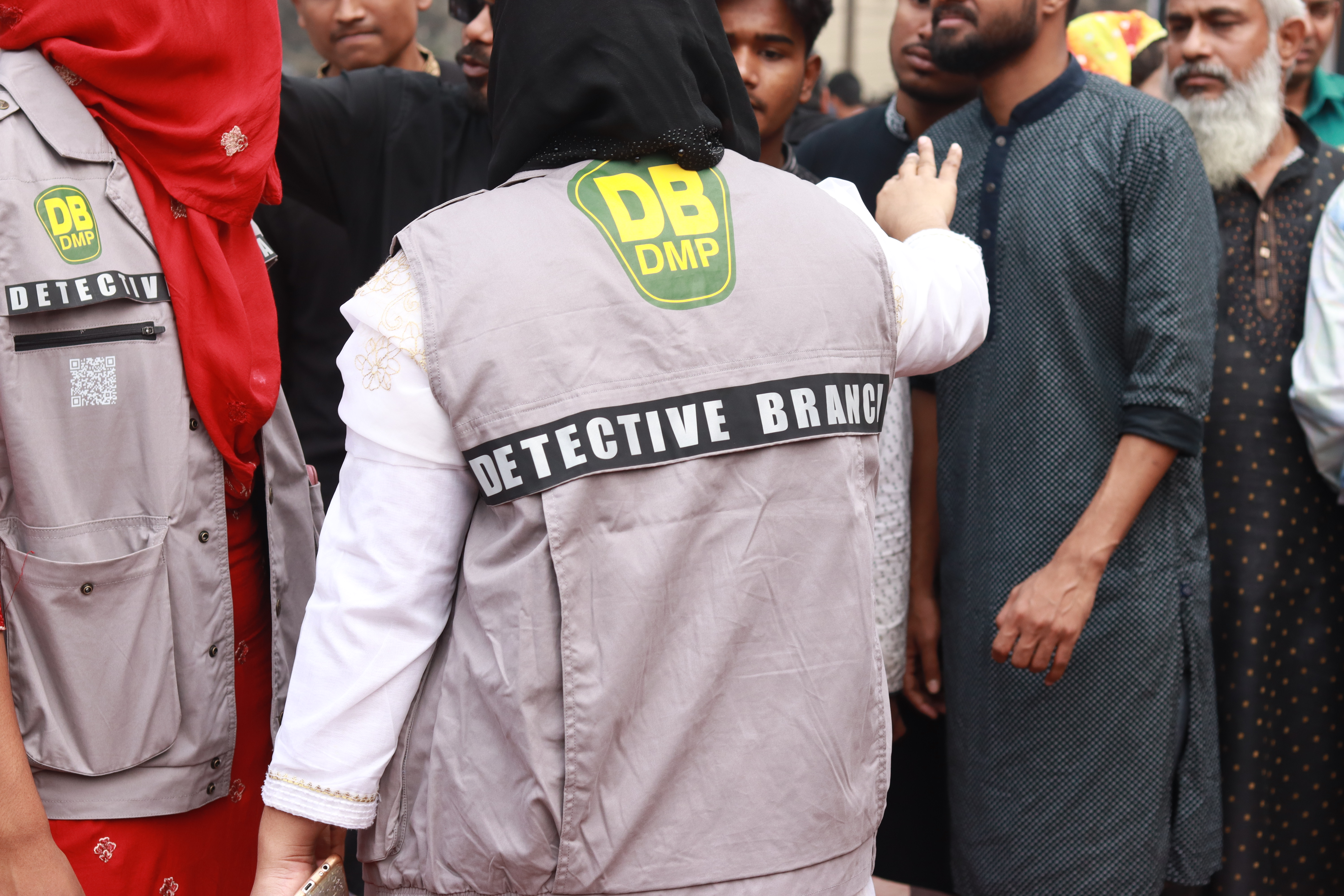
DMP women's DB Police members on duty

In March 2015, seven Detective Branch members entered a border village in Tripura, India while chasing a criminal in Comilla near the Bangladesh-India border. They were surrounded by the villagers, while three detective members escaped four were detained by Indian Border Security Force. They were handed over to Border Guards Bangladesh and BSF asked that the DB men be charged under Bangladeshi laws.

On 1 July 2016, Rabiul Karim, assistant commissioner of the Detective Branch Dhaka died in the July 2016 Dhaka attack trying to storm the restaurant taken over by terrorists. On 12 January 2017, 11 fake members of the branch were arrested in Sabujbagh, Dhaka by the Detective Branch.

Superintendent of Police Harun-ur-Rashid ordered the withdrawal of three officers of the Detective Branch after they had assaulted a nurse on duty at Shaheed Tajuddin Ahmed Medical College Hospital. An inspector of the Detective Branch, Bahauddin Faruqui, was injured after being attacked with machetes while leading a raid in Dhaka. Mahbub Sarkar, sub-inspector of Detective Branch, was shot in April 2016 during a police raid in Tatibazar, Dhaka. The Detective Branch arrested six in Khulna with tiger skins.

The Detective Branch detained four Nigerians on fraud and human trafficking charges. Seven members of the Detective Branch were detained in October 2017 with ransom money after they had kidnapped a businessman in Tekhnaf at a Bangladesh Army check post. In September 2022, those officers were sentenced to seven years of imprisonment.

Inspector Md Jalal Uddin of the Detective Branch was killed in a shootout with criminals in Mirpur while on a joint raid with Mirpur Police Station in March 2018. Sub-inspector Bashir Uddin of the Detective Branch alleged that his former commanding officer Inspector Monirul Islam, and Sub-inspector Kamal Hossain had stolen drugs from a raid and made 800 thousand taka selling them. He and Cox's Bazar's Officer-in-Charge alleged they were threatened by the duo.

A sub-inspector of the Detective Branch, Syed Md Rashedul Alam, was detained for a robbery in Dhaka in December 2019. Detective Branch officials detained and tortured Mohammad Abdul Kaium, a journalist in Mymensingh.

In August 2021, six members of the Detective Branch were detained for robbing a gold businessman of 20 gold bar worth 12.4 million taka.

Harun-ur-Rashid, a controversial policeman, was appointed head of the Detective Branch of DMP on 13 July 2022.

In September 2022, Detective Branch members of Dhaka District north tortured several members of a Hindu family, including a 14-year-old, in Dhamrai when to go to file a robbery case at the police station. They identified the torturers as Inspector Yasin Munshi, Inspector Kamal Hossain, Inspector Kamal Hossain and two unidentified officers. Inspector Yasin Munshi had been involved in a 2011 extrajudicial police killing of a college student, Kazi Imtiaz Hossain Abir.

== Notable cases ==
- The Detective Branch investigated the Murder of Shazneen Tasnim Rahman.
- The branch was given the investigation of the murder of Avijit Roy.
- The branch was given the task to investigate the Murder of Sagar Sarowar and Meherun Runi, after Bangladesh Police failed to solve. The case was transferred to Rapid Action Battalion after the Detective Branch expressed inability to solve the crime.
- The Detective Branch was responsible for investigating and, ultimately, detaining Psycho Samrat.
