= Deputy inspector general of police =

Official position in certain police forces

A Deputy Inspector General of Police (abbreviated as DIG) is a high-ranking official position in Police in Bangladesh, India, Kenya, Malaysia, Nepal, Nigeria, Pakistan and Sri Lanka.

== Bangladesh ==
Deputy inspector general of police is the third-highest rank in the Bangladesh Police. Historically, DIGs have been in charge of the handful of territorial "ranges" and of selected functional departments. The ranges correspond to the administrative divisions of the country. There were 26 DIGs on the force as of 2009. As of 2025, DIGs oversee the eight ranges, seven of the eight metropolitan police branches, the MRT Police, the police hospital, and three training units.

DIGs respond to the police chain of command, but are also responsible in many matters to the general direction of designated civil government officials. At the range level, the DIG answers to the civilian division commissioner. These multiple lines of command sometimes cause friction and confusion.

== India ==
Deputy Inspector General of Police (DIG) is a rank in the Indian police, just below Inspector General of Police. It is a rank held by Indian Police Service officers who had successfully served as Senior Superintendent of Police or Deputy Commissioner of Police (Selection Grade) and got promoted to this rank. DIG-ranked officers wear Gorget patches on their collar which have a dark blue background and a white line stitched on it, similar to SSPs There is no limit to the number of DIGs a state can have and most states have several DIGs. DIGs are in pay band 4 (₹37,400 (US$400) to ₹67,000 (US$710)) with grade pay ₹8,900 (US$94).

The DIGs oversee multiple police districts within their designated police ranges, ensuring efficient policing operations. Additionally, some DIGs head specialised units such as armed police, intelligence, crime branch, or administration, providing leadership and coordination in these critical areas.

== Kenya ==
In Kenya, a Deputy Inspector-General of Police is a three-star rank of the Kenya National Police Service. (S)he is immediately below the Inspector-General and immediately above the Senior Assistant Inspector-General. Two officers hold this position and they command the Kenya Police Service and the Administration Police Service respectively.

== Malaysia ==
Within the Royal Malaysia Police ("Polis DiRaja Malaysia" in Malay) hierarchy, the Deputy Inspector-General of Police occupies the second most senior position, positioned below the Inspector-General of Police and above the Commissioner of Police. Those holding this rank adorn the sultan's-crown insignia, accompanied by four five-pointed stars arranged in a diamond shape, all positioned above crossed baton and kris symbols.

== Pakistan ==
In Pakistan, a Deputy Inspector General of Police is a one-star rank.

== Sri Lanka ==
In Sri Lanka, according to the Police Ordinance, the rank of Deputy Inspector General is the second highest position in the Sri Lanka Police Force. An officer in this rank is responsible for the policing of a Range which constitute a geographical area of two or more Police Divisions commanded by a Superintendent administrating few police districts, in charge of Asst. Superintendents, composed of number of police stations. In terms of section 21(3) of the Police Ordinance 'Inspector General of Police shall be deemed to include a Deputy Inspector General of Police'.

== Gallery ==
DIG Rank Badge of Bangladesh Police

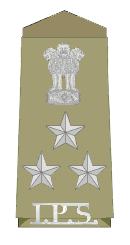
Indian Insignia for the Deputy Inspector General of Police

DIG insignia of Royal Malaysia Police (RMP)
