= Farrokh (name) =

Farrokh, Farokh, or Farrukh (Persian: فرّخ, meaning fortunate and happy), is a masculine given name and surname of Persian origin. Notable people with the name include:

== Given name ==
=== Farokh ===
- Farokh Engineer (born 1938), Indian cricketer
- Farokh Tarapore (born 1960), Indian sailor
- Farokh Udwadia, Indian physician

=== Farrokh ===
- Farrokh Ayazi, American-Iranian electrical engineer
- Farrokh Ghaffari (1922–2006), Iranian film director, actor, critic, and author
- Farrokh Khambata, Indian entrepreneur, restaurateur, chef, and caterer
- Farrokh Khan (1812–1871), Iranian official
- Farrokh Negahdar (born 1946), Iranian political activist
- Farrokh Saidi (1929–2026), Iranian surgeon and academic
- Farrokh Bulsara (1946-1991), British singer and songwriter

=== Farrukh ===
- Farrukh Ahmad (1918–1974), Bangladeshi poet
- Farrukh S. Alvi, American mechanical engineer
- Farrukh Amonatov (born 1978), Tajik chess player
- Farrukh Bari (born 1964), Pakistani cricketer
- Farrukh Beg (1547–??), Persian painter
- Farrukh Chela, Indian miniature painter
- Farrukh Choriyev (born 1984), Tajik footballer
- Farrukh Ahmad Chowdhury, Bangladeshi police officer
- Farrukh Dhondy (born 1944), British writer
- Farrukh Dustov (born 1986), Uzbek tennis player
- Farrukh Gayibov (1891–1916), Russian-Azerbaijani pilot
- Farrukh Habib (born 1980), Pakistani politician
- Farrukh Siyar Hashmi (1927–2010), British consultant psychiatrist
- Farrukh Hormizd (died 631), Iranian prince
- Farrukh Ismayilov (born 1978), Azerbaijani footballer
- Farrukh Jaffar (1933–2021), Indian actress and radio presenter
- Farrukh Javaid, Pakistani politician
- Farrukh Javed (born 1958), Pakistani politician
- Farrukh Fateh Ali Khan (1952–2003), Pakistani musician
- Farrukh Kilichev (born 1985), Uzbek boxer
- Farrukh Mukhamedov, Uzbek mathematician
- Farrukh Nurliboev (born 1991), Uzbek footballer
- Farrukh Quraishi (born 1951), Iranian-American footballer
- Farrukh Raza (born 1961), Pakistani cricketer
- Farrukh Ahmed Rehan, Bangladeshi model and actor
- Farrukh Saleem, Pakistani political scientist, economist, financial analyst, journalist, and television personality
- Farrukh Sayfiev (born 1991), Uzbek footballer
- Farrukh-Shah (died 1196), amir of Kerman
- Farrukh Shah (died 1182), Kurdish Ayyubid Emir of Baalbek
- Farrukh Shehzad (born 1984), Pakistani cricketer
- Farrukh Shahbaz Warraich (born 1993), Pakistani journalist, columnist, and political analyst
- Farrukh Yasar (1441–1500), shah of Shirvan
- Farrukh Yasar II, shah of Shirvan
- Farrukh-Zad of Ghazna (1025–1059), sultan of the Ghaznavid Empire
- Farrukh Zaman (born 1956), Pakistani cricketer
- Farrukh Zeynalov (1942–2022), Azerbaijani politician
- Farrukh Zokirov (born 1946), Uzbek composer, singer, and artistic director

== Surname ==
=== Farrokh ===
- Kaveh Farrokh (born 1962), Canadian-Iranian author

=== Farrukh ===
- Bushra Farrukh (born 1957), Pakistani poet

== See also ==
- Farrokh (disambiguation)
- Farrokhroo Parsa (1922–1980), Iranian politician
- Farooq, a given name and surname
