= Abitov =

Abitov (masculine) or Abitova (feminine) is a surname. Notable people with the surname include:

- Farukh Abitov (born 1988), Kyrgyzstani footballer
- Inga Abitova (born 1982), Russian long-distance runner
- Roza Abitova (born 2003), Kazakh rhythmic gymnast

== See also ==
- Abilov
- Abitovo
