= Rajshahi silk =

Textiles produced in Rajshahi, Bangladesh, from various silk fibres

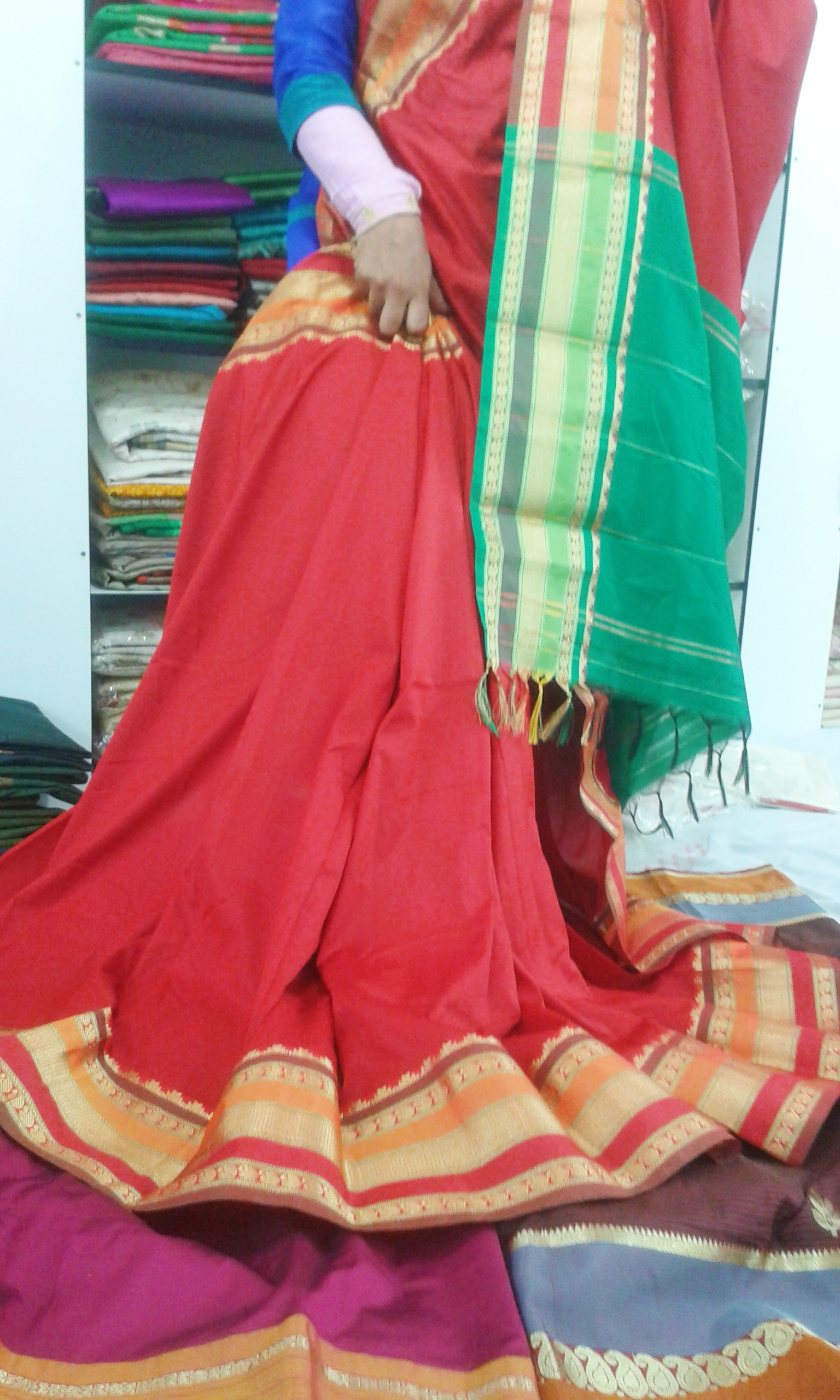
Rajshahi silk sari

Rajshahi silk is the name given to the silk products produced in Rajshahi, Bangladesh. It is famous because it is a high quality fabric used for clothing, especially for saris. In 2021, it was given geographical indication status as a product of Bangladesh.

== History ==
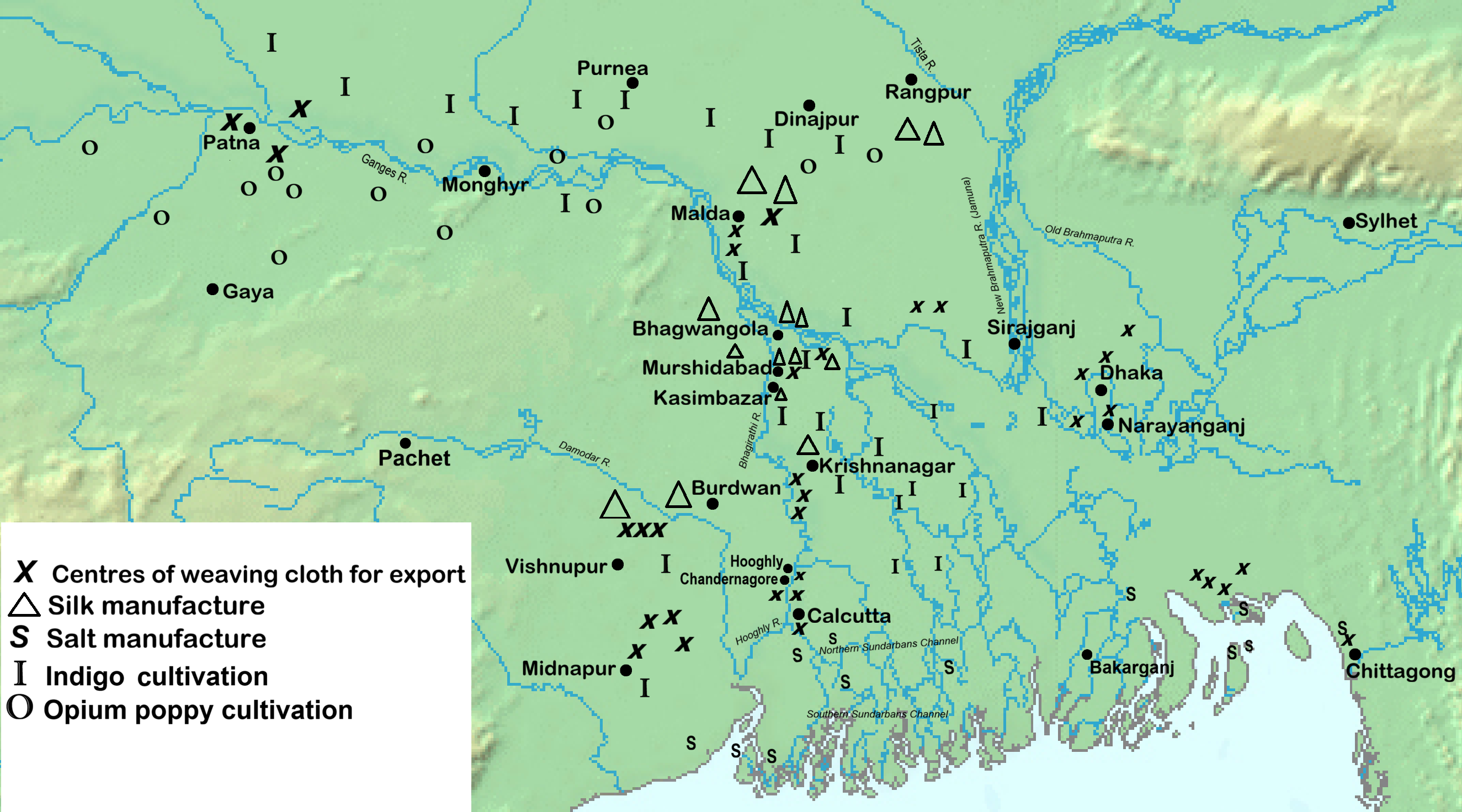
Centres of cloth weaving for export and of Bengal silk manufacture (1740–1828)

Records date the beginning of silk production in the region to the 13th century. It was then known as Bengal silk or Ganges silk. The government of Pakistan started silk production in Rajshahi in 1952. The Rajshahi Silk Factory was a state owned factory that was founded in 1961. In 1978, it was handed over to the Bangladesh Sericulture Development Board. Since then it has been making a loss. It was closed down on 30 November 2002. Before 2002, 300 tonnes of strings were produced by this factory. In 2011, it was only 50 tonnes. In 2011, the finance minister of Bangladesh, Abul Maal Abdul Muhith, expressed interest in reopening the Rajshahi silk factory, but the Privatisation Commission refused on the grounds that it was a loss making concern.

== Types ==
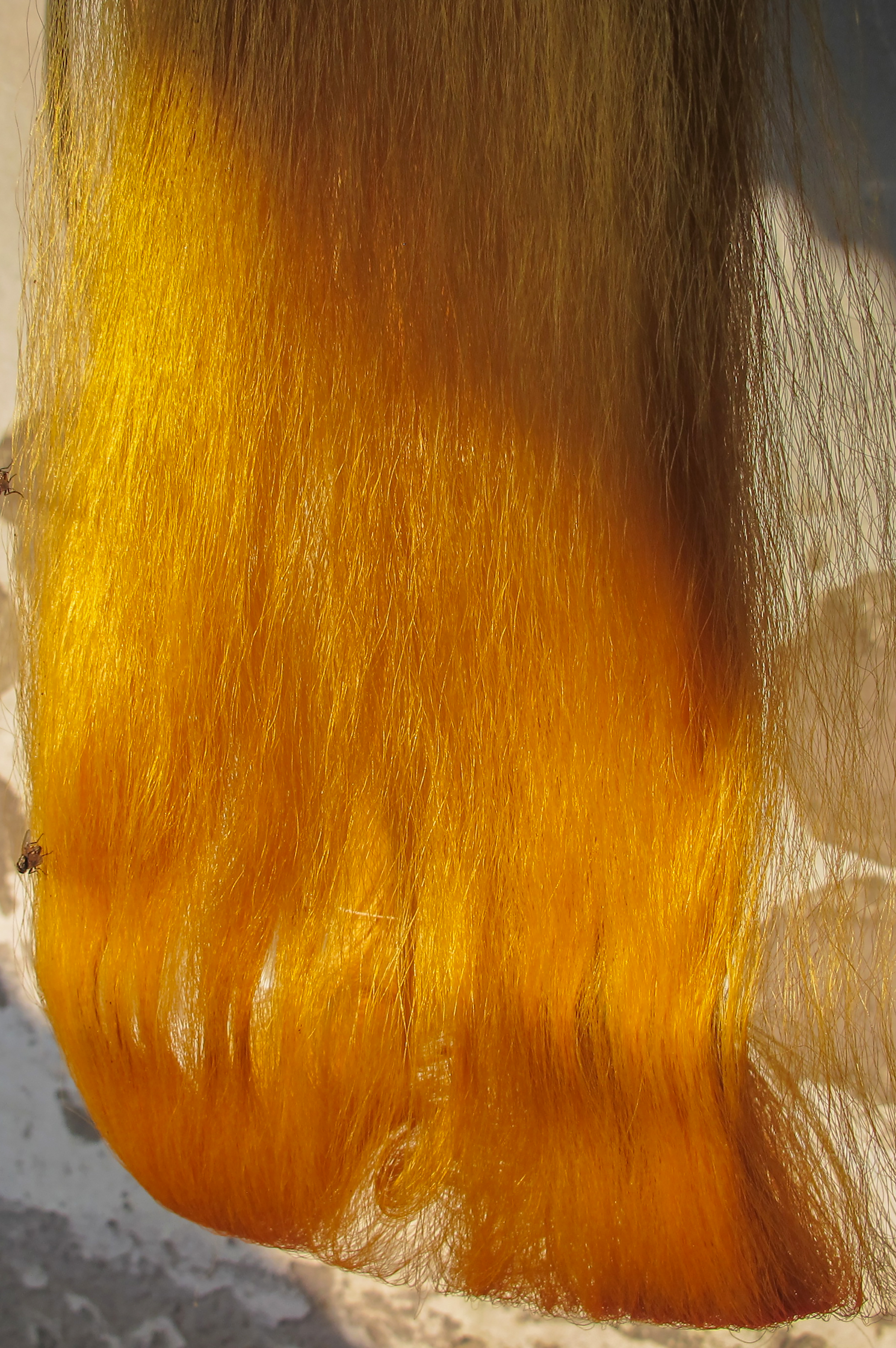
Rajshahi silk fibers.

Rajshahi silk is like all other kinds of silk made from the cocoons of silkworms. The very thin fibers resulting from this process are covered with sericin, a special protein. There are mainly three varieties of silk:

- Mulberry silk
- Eri silk (Endi silk) and
- Tassar silk.

Among these varieties, mulberry silk is the finest and is therefore the most valuable.

Clothes like saris made out of Rajshahi silk are highly popular all over Bangladesh. Rajshahi silk is also sold as fabric to designers and is available in different colours and designs.

== Significance ==
In 2011 there were seven silk factories and the Bangladesh Sericulture Research and Training Institute in Rajshahi. Most of the silk of Bangladesh is produced by the region's sericulture. Approximately 100,000 people are directly or indirectly employed in this sector. The Rajshahi Silk Industry and Factory Labourers' Union represent the workers in the silk industry.

== Gallery ==
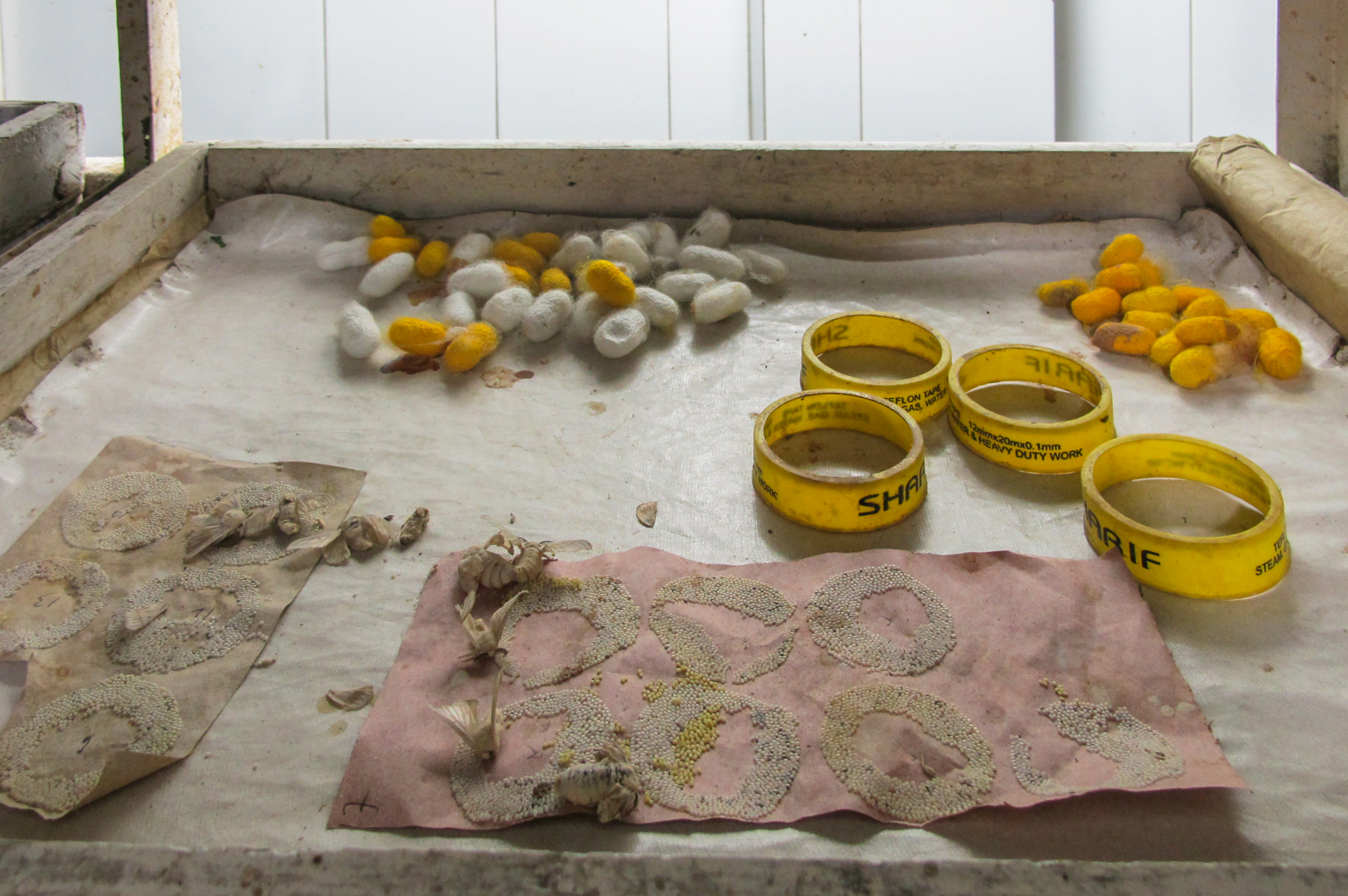
Silk cocoon

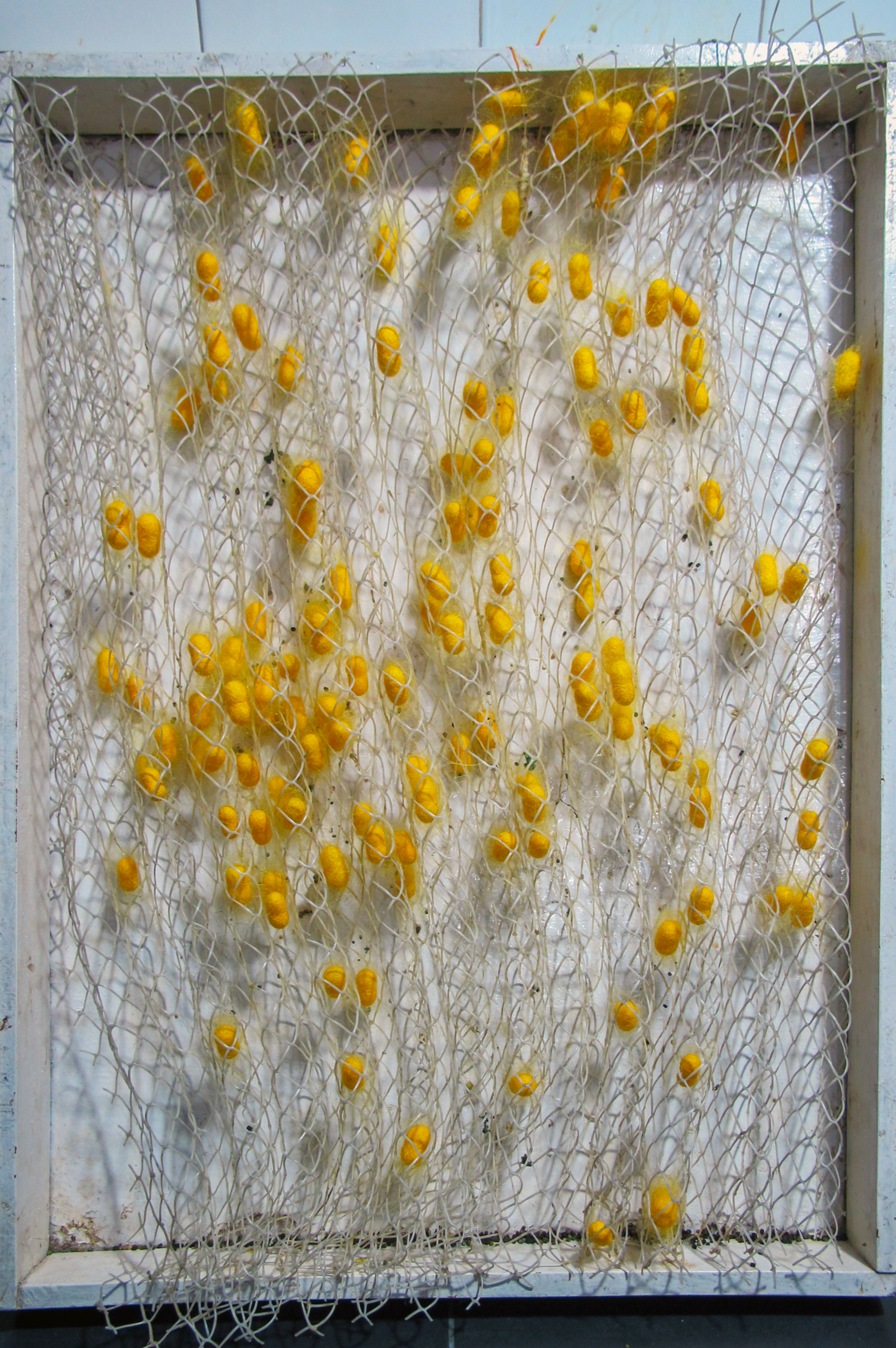
Silk cocoon

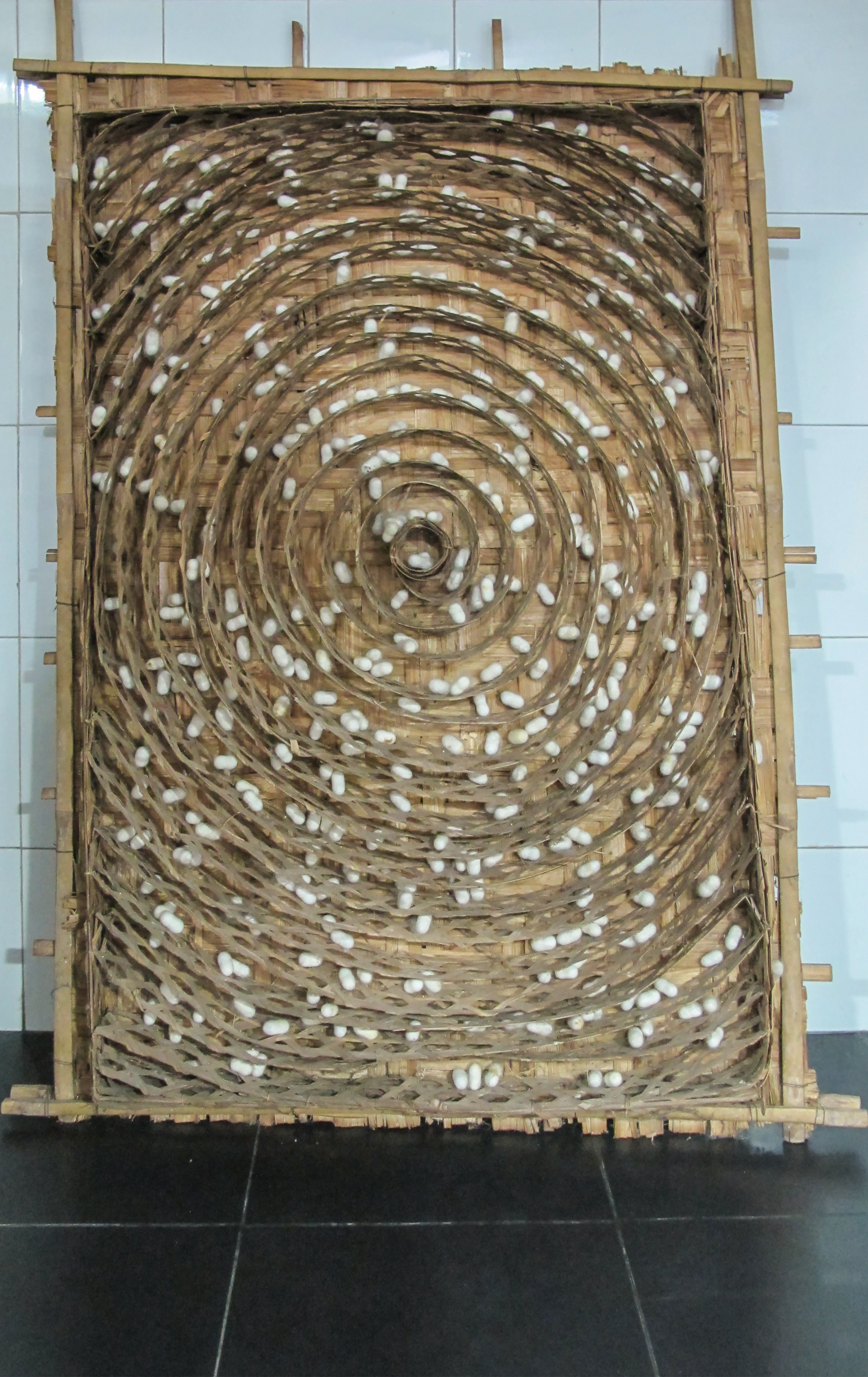
Silk cocoon

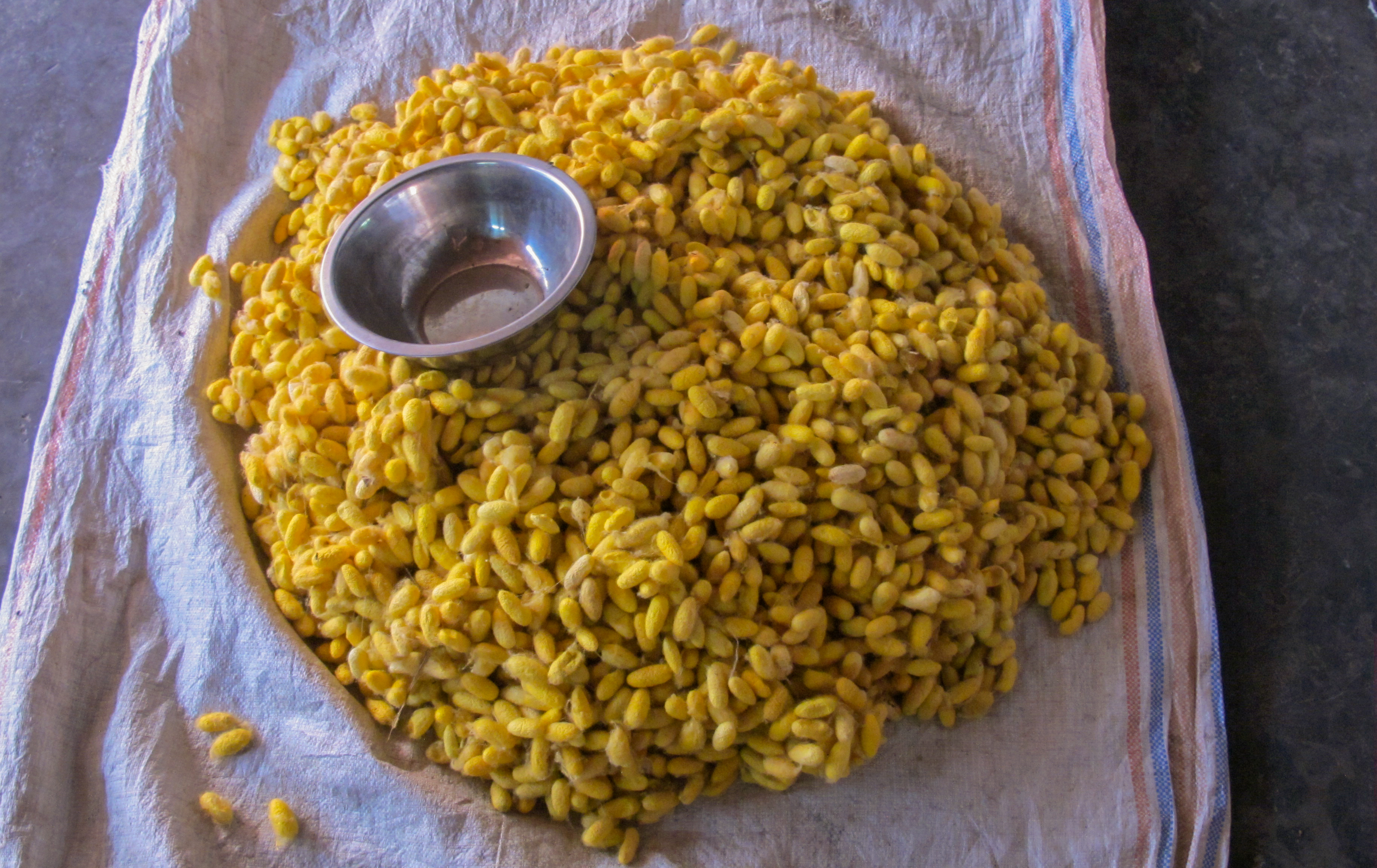
Silk cocoon

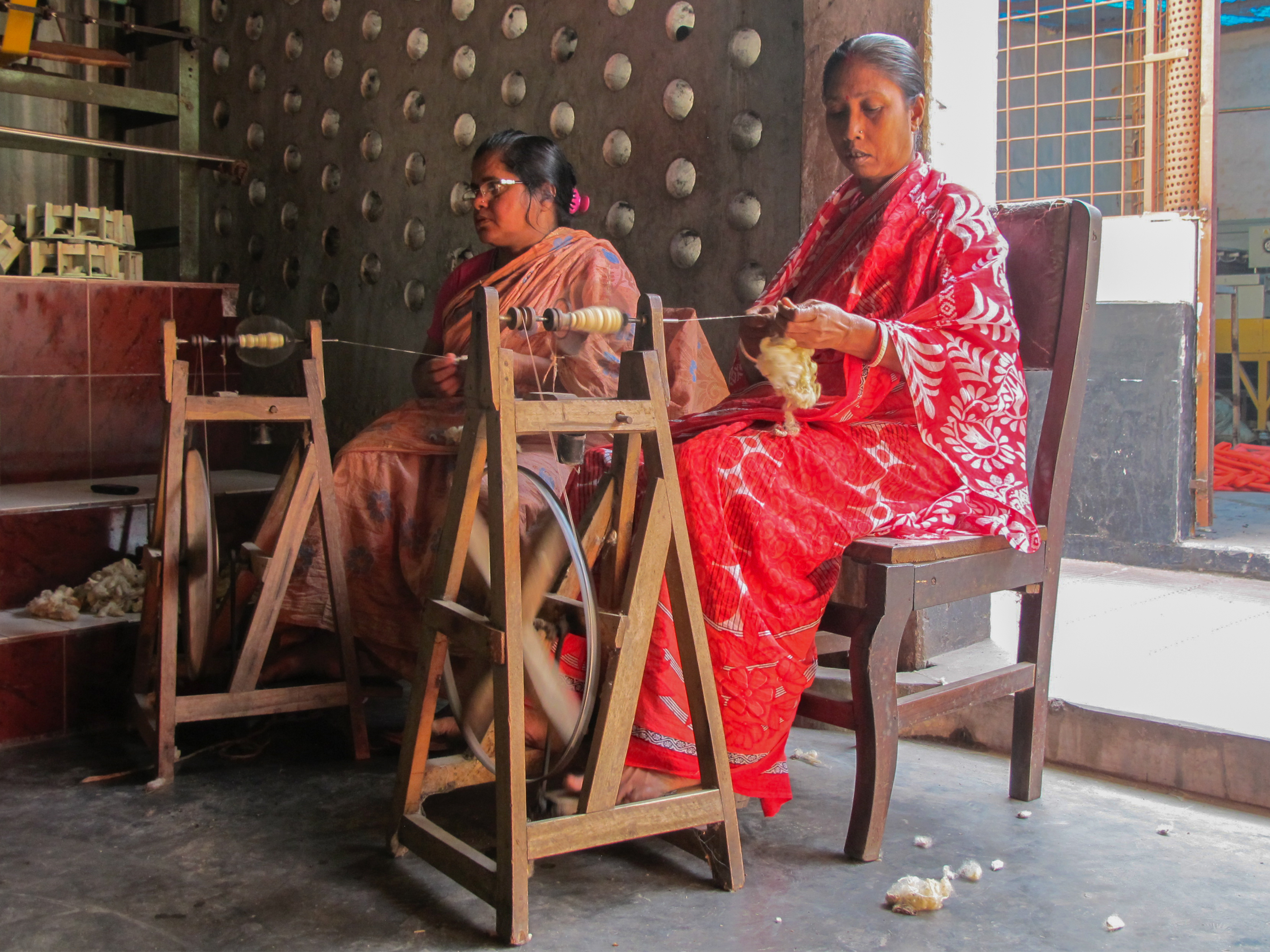
Silk weaving

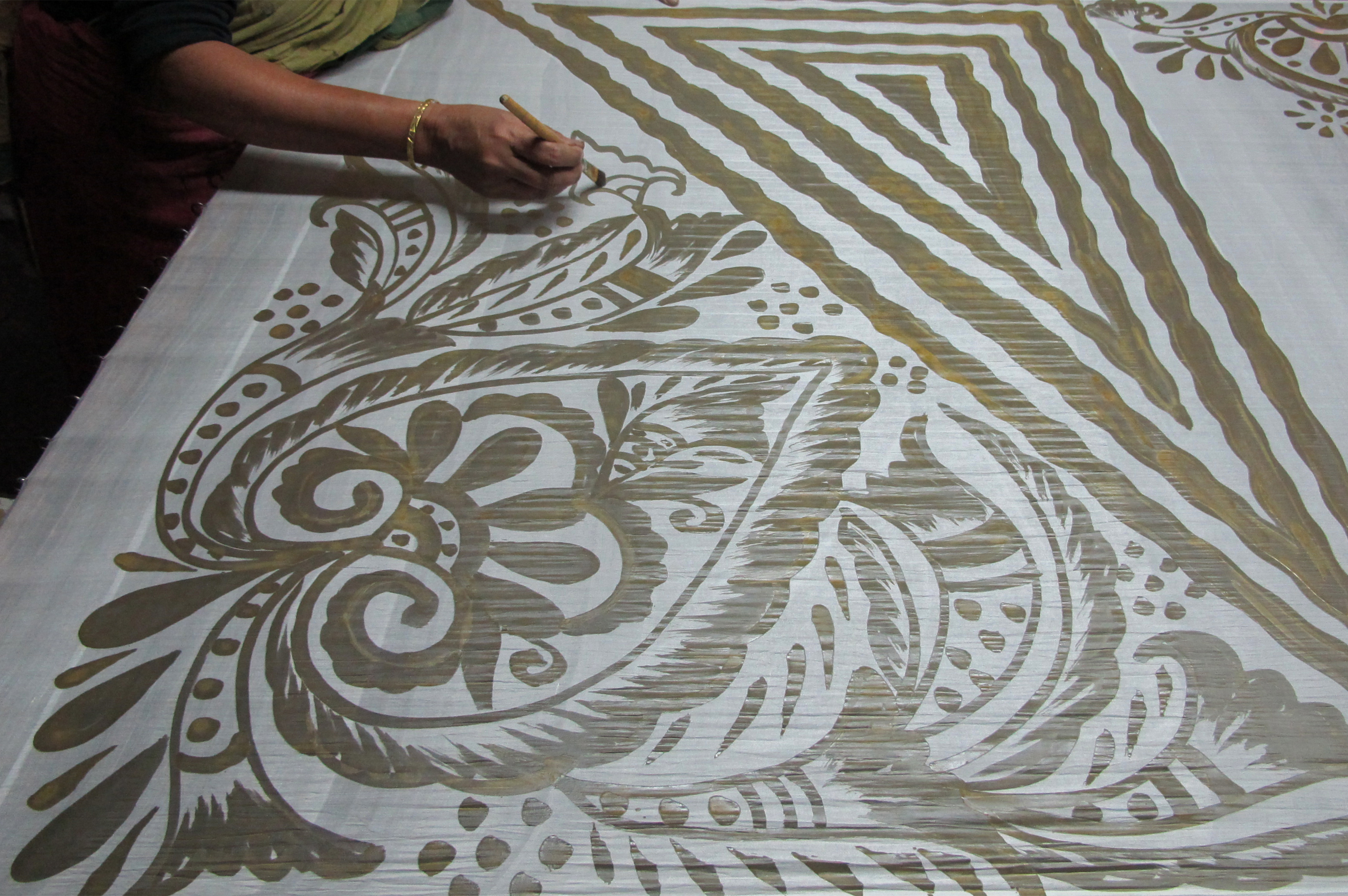
Waxing on Rajshahi silk

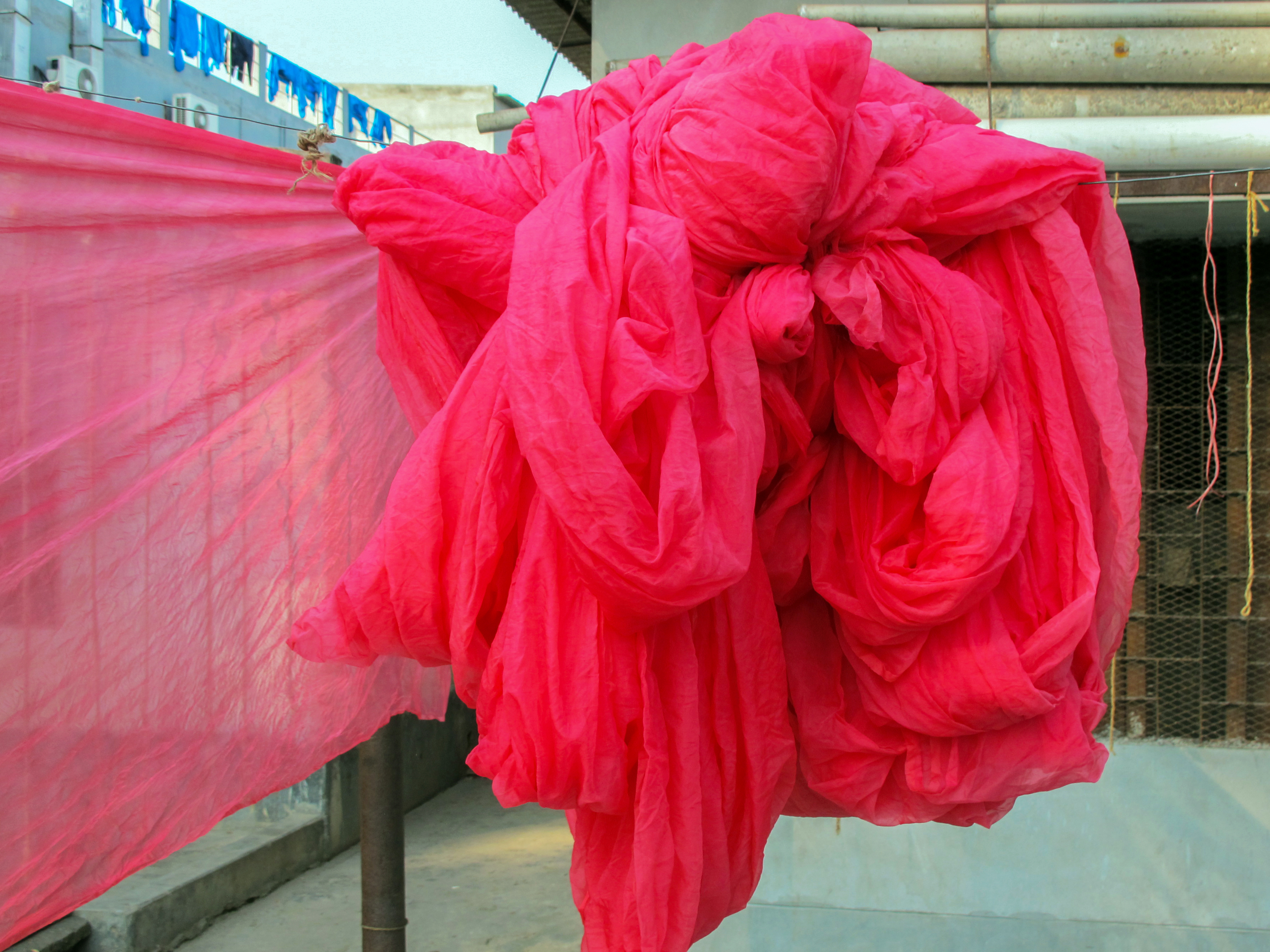
