= Mustafa Kamal =

Mustafa Kamal, Mostafa Kamal or variations may refer to:

- Abu Hena Mustafa Kamal (1936–1989), professor of Bengali literature
- AKM Mustafa Kamal Pasha (born 1963), Major General of Bangladesh Army
- Lotfi Mustafa Kamal (born 1952), Egyptian airman and politician
- Md. Mustafa Kamal (born 1970), Bangladeshi police and chief of Police Bureau of Investigation
- Mostafa Kamal (Bir Sreshtho) (1947–1971), Bangladeshi military hero
- Mostafa Kamal (footballer) (born 1973), Egyptian footballer
- Mostafa Kamal Pasha (born 1950), Bangladeshi politician
- Mostafa Kamal Tolba (1922–2016), Egyptian scientist
- Mustafa Kamal (ambassador), Bangladeshi ambassador
- Mustafa Kamal (judge) (1933–2015), Chief Justice of Bangladesh
- Mustafa Kamal Mahmoud (1921–2009), Egyptian doctor, philosopher, and author
- Mustafa Kamal (politician) (born 1947), Bangladeshi politician and businessman
- Mustafa Kamil Pasha (1874–1908), Egyptian lawyer, journalist, and nationalist activist
- Mustafa Kemal Atatürk (1881–1938), Turkish field marshal, revolutionary statesman, and founder of the Republic of Turkey as well as its first President
- Mustafa Kemal Kurdaş (1920–2011), Turkish economist and politician
- Mustapha Kamal N'Daw (born 1981), Gambian footballer
- Sheikh Mustafa Kamal (fl. 1980s–2000s), Indian politician
- Syed Mustafa Kamal (born 1971), Pakistani politician and former mayor of Karachi
