= Dhananjay Kumar Das =

Former Bureaucrat of Bangladesh

Dhananjoy Kumar Das
- ধনঞ্জয় কুমার দাস
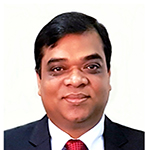
- Born: 1975 (age 50–51)
- Education: Notre Dame College, Dhaka
- Occupation: Bureaucrat
- Awards: Shaheed Dhirendranath Datta Memorial Award 2023

Dhananjoy Kumar Das is a former joint secretary of the Ministry of Home Affairs in charge of the police wing under the Public Security Division. After the fall of the Sheikh Hasina led Awami League government he was transferred to the Bangladesh Sericulture Development Board and the Anti-Corruption Commission began an investigation against the Minister of Home Affairs and Das. Prior to that, he worked as Joint Secretary of Health Service Division, Deputy Secretary of Public Security Division, First Secretary (diplomatic rank) at Bangladesh High Commission, Malaysia and other capacities in the field administration.

== Early life ==
Das was born in 1975 at Hatiya Upazila in Noakhali District, Bangladesh. He completed a master's degree from the Department of Biochemistry and Molecular Biology, University of Dhaka. He obtained his Master in Business Administration (MBA) from Maulana Abul Kalam Azad University of Technology of West Bengal under TCS of Colombo Plan Scholarship. He joined Bangladesh Civil Service on 31 June 2003 as Assistant Commissioner and Magistrate.

== Career ==
Das joined the 21st admin batch of the Bangladesh Civil Service. He was the President of the 21st BCS admin forum. He was also elected as Joint Secretary General of Bangladesh Administrative Service Association.

Das served as a joint secretary in the Ministry of Home Affairs and later held a position in the development wing of the Public Security Division. He signed the order appointing Mohammad Shafiqul Islam chief of the Criminal Investigation Department in May 2019. In June 2020, he signed the promotion order of 215 superintendents of police. He briefly served as the joint secretary of the Ministry of Health and Family Welfare. In September 2021, following the arrest of Pori Moni, he sent an additional deputy inspector general of police of the Criminal Investigation Department, Sheikh Omar Faruque, who was investigating the case into forced retirement. In May 2022, he promoted 32 additional deputy inspector generals of Police. In October 2022, he confirmed the retirement of Md Shafiqul Islam as commissioner of the Dhaka Metropolitan Police.

After the fall of the Sheikh Hasina-led Awami League government in August 2024, Das was transferred to the Ministry of Textiles and Jute for an appointment as director of the Bangladesh Sericulture Development Board. However, he joined the new post, but his joining had not been accepted. Later he was transferred to the Ministry of Public Administration, but due to continuous threats from the fundamentalists he didn't join the ministry'. In August, the Anti-Corruption Commission started a corruption investigation against the former Minister of Home Affairs, Asaduzzaman Khan, and senior civil servants Harun-ur-Rashid Biswas and Das very much intentionally.

Das had been absent from duty without official leave since 3 September 2024. In September 2024, he was named as one of 223 accused individuals in a murder case filed at Tejgaon Police Station related to the death of a student during the protests against Sheikh Hasina. But Das stated on his Facebook profile that at the time of the incident he was in Bhutan on a family vacation trip. His name was sent to the Anti-Corruption Commission along with 49 other administration cadre officers on 8 September. The government classified his absence as "absconding,". In February 2025, the Anti-Corruption Commission (Bangladesh) filed a case against him. A departmental inquiry initiated in February 2025 allegedly found the allegations of misconduct and flight from duty to be "undoubtedly proven," while a third allegation of incitement remained unsubstantiated. Despite being served with two show-cause notices, Das failed to respond to either.

On 28 July 2025, the Ministry of Public Administration issued a gazette notification formally dismissing him from public service for misconduct and unauthorized absence.

== Award ==
In 2023, Das, serving as Joint Secretary in the Ministry of Health and Family Welfare (Bangladesh), was honored with the Shaheed Dhirendranath Datta Memorial Award 2023 for his contributions to public administration. That year, the award was presented to nine distinguished individuals from across Bangladesh for their excellence in various fields.
