= Farrokh =

Farrokh may refer to:

- Farrokh (name), including a list of people with the given name and surname, also variant spellings
- Qanat-e Farrokh, village in Iran
- Farrokh Pey, village in Iran
- Farrokh Shahr, city in Iran
- Farrokh Bolagh, East Azerbaijan, village in Iran
- Farrokh Bolagh, Hamadan, village in Iran
- Zu ol Farrokh, village in Iran

== See also ==
- Farrokhzad (disambiguation)
- Farukh (disambiguation)
