= Md. Sibgat Ullah =

Bangladeshi police officer

- মোঃ সিবগাত উল্লাহ

18th Additional Inspector General of Criminal Investigation Department (Bangladesh)
- In office May 2025 – 16 March 2026
- President: Mohammed Shahabuddin
- Prime Minister: Muhammad Yunus (acting)
- Preceded by: Gazi Jashim Uddin
- Police career
- Allegiance: Bangladesh
- Branch: Bangladesh Police
- Service years: 1995-2026
- Status: Retired
- Rank: Additional IGP

Md. Sibgat Ullah is an additional inspector general of Bangladesh Police and chief of the Criminal Investigation Department. He has held several important positions, including director of administration and finance at the Police Staff College and chief of the Industrial Police.

== Early life and education ==
Sibgat Ullah joined the Bangladesh Police through the 15th Bangladesh Civil Service (BCS) Police Cadre in 1995. He holds a B.Sc. and M.Sc. from the University of Rajshahi.

== Career ==
Ullah has held numerous leadership positions within the Bangladesh Police over his three-decade career. In May 2008, he was appointed assistant inspector general to the police headquarters. He was the superintendent of police of Narayanganj District. He was part of the Police Reform Program supported by the United Nations Development Programme.

Ullah served as director (administration and finance) and a member of the directing staff at the Police Staff College Bangladesh, contributing to curriculum development and officer training.

Ullah served in two United Nations peacekeeping missions in Ivory Coast and Darfur, Sudan. He also participated in professional training programs in Singapore, Malaysia, and Austria. Ullah has been awarded the President Police Medal and the Bangladesh Police Medal.

In 2024, Ullah was the deputy inspector general of the Industrial Police. He had to tackle unrest in the industrial areas after the fall of the Sheikh Hasina-led Awami League government. He was then appointed additional IGP (current charge) of the Industrial Police. Bangladesh Garment Manufacturers and Exporters Association thanked him and other police officers for protecting factories during that time.

In May 2025, Ullah was promoted to the rank of additional inspector general of police (addl. IGP).

Shortly afterward, Ullah was transferred to the Criminal Investigation Department and appointed its chief. While Gazi Jasim Uddin of the Criminal Investigation Department was transferred to the Industrial Police.

== Notable work ==
=== Reduction of CID case backlog ===
During his 313-day tenure as Chief of the Criminal Investigation Department (CID), pending cases reportedly decreased from approximately 600 to around 50.

=== Financial crime investigations ===
Under his leadership, CID investigated 17 money-laundering cases involving BEXIMCO-affiliated companies, concerning approximately US$96.97 million in alleged money laundering. The investigations resulted in court-ordered seizures and freezing of assets estimated at ৳600–700 crore.

=== Bangladesh Bank reserve heist investigation ===
During his tenure as CID Chief, the department obtained a court order concerning US$81 million held by the Philippine bank RCBC in connection with the Bangladesh Bank reserve heist.

=== Forensic and digital investigation ===
During his tenure, CID highlighted the development of technology-based investigative capabilities, including digital forensics, DNA identification and scientific crime-scene investigation.
