= Criminal Investigation Department (Bangladesh) =

Bangladesh Police investigation unit

Criminal Investigation Department ক্রিমিনাল ইনভেস্টিগেশন ডিপার্টমেন্ট
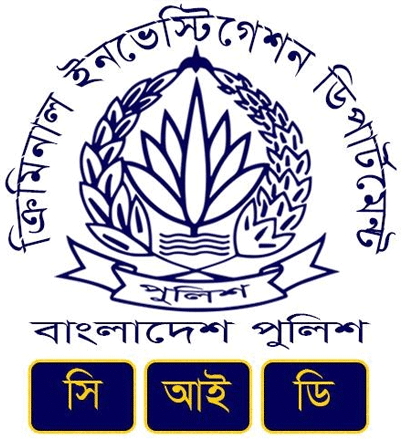
- Emblem of Criminal Investigation Department

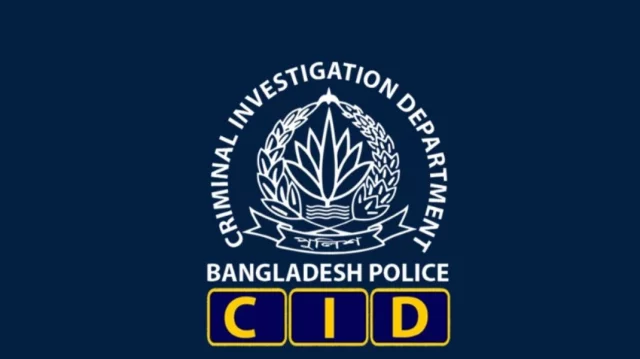
- Flag of Criminal Investigation Department
- Abbreviation: CID

Agency overview
- Formed: 1972; 54 years ago
- Employees: Classified
- Annual budget: Classified

Jurisdictional structure
- National agency: Bangladesh
- Operations jurisdiction: Bangladesh
- Area: 148,460 km^{2} (57,320 sq mi)
- Population: 162 million
- Governing body: Ministry of Home Affairs
- Constituting instrument: The Police Act, 1861

Operational structure
- Headquarters: Malibagh, Dhaka
- Minister responsible: Salahuddin Ahmed, Minister of Home Affairs
- Agency executive: DIG Barrister Mohammad Mosharraf Hossain, Chief Executive
- Parent agency: Bangladesh Police
- Type of Agency's: Investigation Directorate General

Website
- www.cid.gov.bd

The Criminal Investigation Department(Bengali: ক্রিমিনাল ইনভেস্টিগেশন ডিপার্টমেন্ট, romanized: Kriminal Inbēstīgēśan Ḍipārṭmēnṭ; abbreviated as CID) is a specialized intelligence and investigation wing of Bangladesh Police responsible for investigating serious and complex crimes across the country. Established to provide professional investigative support, CID handles cases involving homicides, organized crime, financial crimes, cybercrime, and high-profile criminal investigations. The department employs modern forensic, technical, and intelligence-gathering techniques and works closely with other national and international law enforcement agencies to solve crimes efficiently and uphold the rule of law in Bangladesh.

== History ==
In 2009, the Criminal Investigation Department in Chittagong received an advanced forensic lab facility.

The South Korean government provided training to 15 officers of the Criminal Investigation Department from 24 November to 10 December 2011 through the Korea International Cooperation Agency at Korea Police Investigation Academy.

Following attacks on the indigenous Santal community in Gaibandha District in 2019, the Criminal Investigation Department was appointed to investigate. The charge sheet submitted by the CID was rejected by the Santal Community who alleged names of local Members of Parliament, Abul Kalam Azad, and Managing Director of state-owned Rangpur Sugar Mill, Abdul Awal, was not included in the charge sheet but that of a dead Awami League leader was included. The Santal plaintiff filed a no-confidence petition against the charge sheet with Gobindaganj court in January 2020.

The Criminal Investigation Department arrested a man on the charge of making derogatory comments about the first doctor to die in the COVID-19 pandemic in Bangladesh. On 6 July 2020, the Criminal Investigation Department started investigations against Member of Parliament Mohammad Shahid Islam, who had been detained in Kuwait on human trafficking and corruption charges. On 22 November 2020, the CID arrested Tithy Sarkar, a student of Jagannath University, who was accused of making "derogatory" comments about Islam and Muhammad. She had been missing since October 2020 when the comments first emerged on social media.

The Criminal Investigation Department announced plans to establish a central database of licensed weapons in Bangladesh on 24 March 2021 using Automated Ballistic Identification Systems.

The Deputy Inspector General of the Cyber Wing of the Criminal Investigation Department, Jamil Ahmed, investigated the laundering of 1 billion taka through streaming apps like BIGO Live by a group of Chinese and Bangladeshi nationals on 13 June 2021. In July 2021, Additional Deputy Inspector General of CID Kamrul Ahsan stated that cryptocurrencies were illegal in Bangladesh, which was contradicted by Bangladesh Bank.

On 6 August 2021, the Criminal Investigation Department was handed the cases against Faria Mahbub Piasha, Helena Jahangir, Moriom Akter Mou and Pori Moni who were detained in separate raids by Rapid Action Battalion. Sheikh Omar Faruque, Additional Deputy Inspector General of the Criminal Investigation Department and the investigation officer four, was sent into forced retirement by the government of Bangladesh after he was criticised by Bangladesh High Court for violating its directive by placing Pori Moni on remand multiple times.

== Chief Executives ==
Sl No.	Name	Start date	End date	Reference
1.	Farrukh Ahmad Chowdhury	23 January 2004	1 February 2005	
2.	Mohammed Shamsul Islam	1 February 2005	18 August 2005	
3.	Md. Amjad Hossain	18 August 2005	29 December 2005	
4.	Khuda Baksh Chowdhury	9 January 2006	1 November 2006	
5.	SM Mizanur Rahman	2 November 2006	5 November 2006	
6.	Nur Mohammad	14 January 2007	28 January 2007	
7.	Phani Bhoushon Choudhury	1 February 2007	19 February 2008	
8.	Mohammad Javed Patwary	19 February 2008	16 March 2009	
9.	Syed Shahzaman Raj	16 March 2009	14 October 2010	
10.	Md. Mokhlesur Rahman	14 October 2010	1 January 2015	
11.	Sheikh Hemayet Hossain	19 January 2015	3 May 2019	
12.	Md. Shafiqul Islam	19 May 2019	12 September 2019	
13.	Chowdhury Abdullah Al-Mamun	10 October 2019	14 March 2020	
14.	Barrister Mahbubur Rahman	5 May 2020	30 July 2022	
15.	Mohammad Ali Mia	23 August 2022	13 August 2024	
16.	Md. Matiur Rahman Sheikh	16 October 2024	5 March 2024	
17.	Gazi Jashim Uddin	17 March 2025	May 2025	
18.	Md. Sibgat Ullah	May 2025	16 March 2026	
19.	Mosleh Uddin Ahmed	25 March 2026	17 May 17, 2026	

== Notable cases ==
- Bangladesh Rifles revolt- The Criminal Investigation Department pressed charges against 824 individuals, civilians and soldiers of Bangladesh Rifles soldiers, on 13 July 2010. The case was investigated by Special Superintendent Abdul Kahar Akand.
- 2013 Dhaka garment factory collapse
- Bangladesh Bank robbery, The Criminal Investigation Department found Bangladesh Bank did not use firewalls and had used cheap second-hand equipment.
- Murder of Sohagi Jahan Tonu, They interrogated three local Comilla artists in their investigation of Tonu's murder. They failed to solve the crime for four years and then handed over the case to Police Bureau of Investigation in 2020.

== Controversies ==
On 25 November 2017, 11 members of the Criminal Investigation Department were found to have taken 4.5 million taka from recruiting agents by an investigation of the police headquarters. The investigation was started following complaints by the Bangladesh Association of International Recruiting Agencies.

On 20 April 2019, Detective Branch arrested a constable of the Criminal Investigation Department Uttara zone, Taijuddin, and his informant, Abul Bashar, with 990 Yaba pills in Savar Upazila.

On 30 June 2020, Md Imam Hossain, the Joint Commissioner of Dhaka Metropolitan Police, was transferred to the Criminal Investigation Department following a request of the Commissioner of Dhaka Metropolitan Police Md Shafiqul Islam who had alleged that Imran offered him a bribe. He was appointed the additional deputy inspector general of the CID in an order signed by Dhananjay Kumar Das, Deputy Secretary at the Ministry of Home Affairs.

On 26 August 2021, three officers of the Criminal Investigation Department were arrested after they abducted a man and his mother for ransom. The arrestees are Assistant Superintendent of Police Hasinur Rahman, an assistant sub-inspector, and a constable. The officers were stationed in Rangpur District while the abductee was living in Dinajpur District. They CID officers were denied bail on 1 September 2021 by a Dinapur Court.

On 8 September 2021, Aksaduzzaman, a former Sub Inspector of the Criminal Investigation Department, was detained for his involvement in the robbery of a migrant working on his way to the airport to fly to Dubai on 19 October 2020. His wife alleged she gave 1.4 million taka to Kaysar Rizvi Korayshi, Deputy Commissioner of Detective Branch, which he denied. Aksaduzzam was placed on the remand of the Detective Branch by Debbrata Biswas, Metropolitan Magistrate, on 9 September 2021.
