= Babul Akter =

SP Babul Akhter
- Born: 1975 (age 50–51); Modonpur village, Shailkupa Upazila, Jhenaidah District, Bangladesh
- Education: Government Brajalal College; Islamic University, Bangladesh
- Occupation: Police officer
- Known for: Accused in the murder case of his wife, Mahmuda Khanam Mitu

Babul Akhter is a former Bangladeshi police officer who gained national prominence for his counter-terrorism efforts, particularly in Chittagong. He was incarcerated for the alleged murder of his wife, Mahmuda Khanam Mitu.

== Early life and education ==
Akhter was born in 1975 in Modonpur village of Shailkupa Upazila, Jhenaidah District, Bangladesh. His father, Abdul Wadud Mia, was a sub-inspector in the police, and his mother is Shahida Begum.

He completed his SSC in 1990 from Batiaghata High School, Khulna, and HSC in 1992 from Government Brajalal College. He then studied English at Islamic University, Bangladesh, graduating with Honours and a master's degree in 2001. During his university years, Akhter was affiliated with the Bangladesh Islami Chhatra Shibir.

== Career ==
After graduation, Akhter initially joined a World Bank project and was posted in Rajshahi. In 2004, he entered the Bangladesh Civil Service as part of the 24th BCS Police Cadre. Upon completing training at the Sardah Police Academy in 2005, he was posted to the Rapid Action Battalion-2. He later held several key positions including Assistant Commissioner of the Chittagong Metropolitan Police, Assistant SP of Hathazari Upazila in Chittagong District. He was the Additional Superintendent of Police of Cox’s Bazar District and the Deputy Commissioner of Chittagong Metropolitan Police.

In 2014, Akhter was deployed to the UN Peacekeeping Mission in South Sudan. He returned in 2015 and was promoted to Additional Deputy Commissioner (ADC). In 2016, he was promoted to Superintendent of Police and transferred to the Police Headquarters in Dhaka.

Akhter was credited with solving several high-profile cases, including the 2007 six-murder case in Narsingdi District, and successful counterterrorism raids in 2013 and 2015.

== Personal life ==
Akhter married Mahmuda Khanam Mitu in 2001 while studying at Islamic University. Her father, Mosharraf Hossain, was an officer-in-charge in the police force. Akhter and Mitu had two children: a son and a daughter.

On 5 June 2016, Akhter's wife, Mahmuda Khanam Mitu, was murdered in Chittagong. Initial investigations made little progress. In 2020, following a court directive, the case was transferred to the Police Bureau of Investigation. Akhter was arrested on 11 May 2021 based on allegations from Mitu’s family. According to the Police Bureau of Investigation, Akhter, who was having an extramarital affair, orchestrated the murder using hired killers. Investigators also linked him to the murder of SI Akram. In September 2022, he filed a complaint of torture against several police officers including Police Bureau of Investigation chief Banaj Kumar Majumdar.

Akter was charged along with six others in 2023 after a lengthy investigation. He challenged the indictment, but the High Court rejected his petition. After serving 3.5 years in prison, Babul was granted six-month bail by the High Court, which the Appellate Division upheld on 4 December 2024.
