= Bangladesh Small and Cottage Industries Corporation =

Bangladeshi Corporation

- BSCIC logo

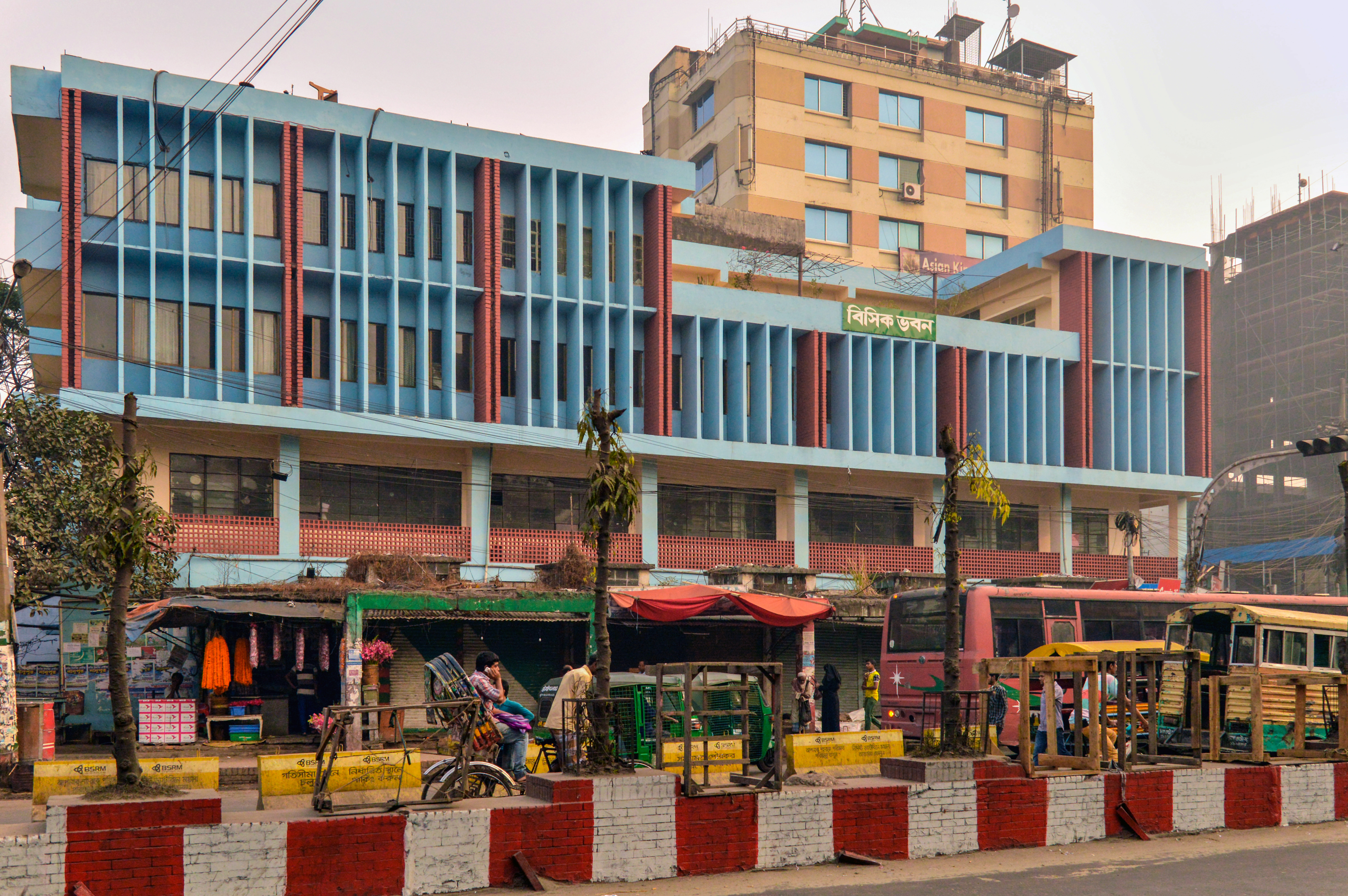
- Chittagong regional office
- Abbreviation: BSCIC
- Formation: 30 May 1957
- Headquarters: Dhaka, Bangladesh
- Region served: Bangladesh
- Official language: Bengali
- Chairman: Md. Mahbubor Rahman
- Website: Bangladesh Small and Cottage Industries Corporation

Bangladesh Small and Cottage Industries Corporation (BSCIC) (Bengali: বাংলাদেশ ক্ষুদ্র ও কুটির শিল্প করপোরেশন, বিসিক) provides comprehensive support services to small, rural, and cottage industry of Bangladesh, particularly in the small and cottage industries sector. It was created through an Act of Parliament in 1957, which was later amended in 1992. BSCIC has country-wide institution network to provide doorstep services for entrepreneurs. Head Office of BSCIC is located at 137–138, Motijheel, Dhaka, Bangladesh.

== History ==
Bangladesh Small and Cottage Industries Corporation traces its origins to East Pakistan Small and Cottage Industries Corporation, which was established through the East Pakistan Small and Cottage Industries Corporation Act. 1957. The act was created by the Minister for Labour, Commerce and Industry Sheikh Mujibur Rahman of the United Front government of East Pakistan. After the Independence of Bangladesh, it was made into BSCIC. In October 1973, BSCIC was split into Bangladesh Cottage Industries Corporation and Bangladesh Small Industries Corporation. In 1975, Bangladesh Handloom Board and Bangladesh Sericulture Board were separated from BSCIC.

== Definition ==
- Small Industry (Manufacturing): Small Industry means an industry in which the value/replacement cost of durable resources other than land and factory buildings is in between (.05 to 15 million) taka and employment generation is not more than 50 persons.
- Cottage Industry (Manufacturing): Cottage Industry means family an industry in which members are engaged part-time or full-time in production and service-oriented activities.
- Medium Industry (Manufacturing): Medium Industry means an industry in which the value/replacement cost of durable resources other than land and factory buildings is between 15 million and 200 million taka and employment generation is not more than 150 persons .

== Functions ==
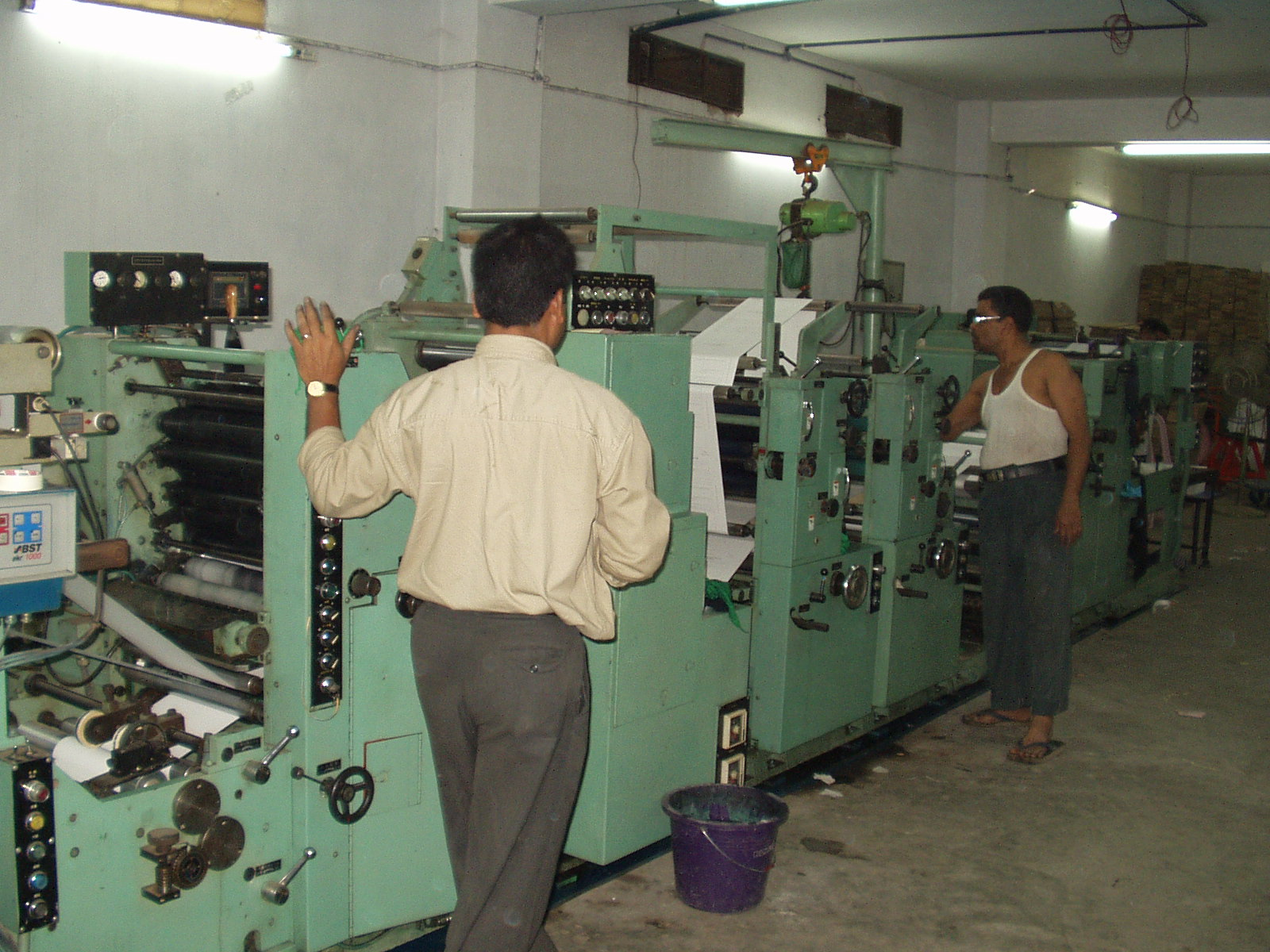
An industrial unit established by a private entrepreneur with the support services of BSCIC

BSCIC provides medium and long-term loans to small industries, either directly, or through a consortium of commercial banks. BSCIC also provides assistance in all other matters relating to the development and expansion of small and cottage industries (SCI). The Bangladesh Small and Cottage Industry Corporation (BSCIC) is the official body which monitors the development of self-employment, cottage industries and small enterprises. It produces statistics on the types of enterprises, their activities and the number of people employed.

Its major functions are:

- Promotion and registration of small and cottage industries
- Conducting advisory and industrial promotion services including training of entrepreneurs
- Skill development for artisans and craftsmen
- Creation of jobs for SCIs
- Construction and development of industrial estates with necessary infrastructural facilities for SCI
- Development of linkages between SCIs and large and medium-sized industries.
- Online Service for registration of Industry, Application for Industrial plots, Application for Training facilities will be provided very soon.

== Current status ==
BSCIC has developed a total of 82 industrial estates throughout the country to foster the growth of SCIs in a balanced manner including special types like Tannery industrial estate at Savar, API (Active Pharmaceutical Ingredients) and Construction works Chemical Industrial Park, Printing Induatrial Park & Plastic Estate are under execution.

== Footnotes ==
1 BSCIC_ACT http://bdlaws.minlaw.gov.bd/pdf_part.php?act_name=&vol=&id=274
