= Mihir Kanti Majumder =

- Born: 14 May 1953 (age 73); Pirojpur District, East Bengal, Pakistan
- Occupation: Former Secretary
- Years active: Retired
- Relatives: Banaj Kumar Majumder (Brother)

Mihir Kanti Majumder a retired secretary of the Ministry of Environment, Forest and Climate Change and chairman of Environment, Climate Change and Social Development Initiatives (ECSDI). He is a former chairman of the Palli Sanchay Bank.

== Early life ==
Majumder was born on 14 May 1953 in Pirojpur District, East Bengal, Pakistan. He did his masters in primary health care management and PhD in health care administration.

== Career ==
Majumder joined the Bangladesh Civil Service as an admin cadre in 1981. He has served as an Assistant Commissioner and Upazila Nirbahi Officer of Paikgachha Upazila.

Majumder was the deputy secretary of the Ministry of Health & Family Planning. He was promoted to joint secretary in 2003. He was a leader of the Bangladesh Scouts.

Majumder was a member of the Land Reform Board. He was appointed to the Implementation, Monitoring and Evaluation Division in 2009. As Secretary of the Rural Development and Co-operatives Division, he appointed Mohammad Munir Chowdhury chairman of Milk Vita, who developed a reputation as an anti-corruption crusader.

In 2014, Majumder was appointed the first chairperson of the newly created state-owned Palli Sanchay Bank. He was accused of violating rules and laws while carrying out recruitment at the bank. In 2016, he was sued for making allegedly defamatory comments against Prime Minister Sheikh Hasina. By 2018, the bank had nearly 73 percent bad loans and was on the verge of collapse. He received the Nature Conservation Award from Prokriti O Jibon Foundation.

In 2022, Majumder's name was proposed for the post of commissioner of the Bangladesh Election Commission. He is a director of Surjer Hashi Network. He sought the nomination of Awami League ahead of the 2024 general election. After the fall of the Sheikh Hasina-led Awami League government, the Muhammad Yunus-led interim government cancelled his passport. It also cancelled the passport of his brother, Banaj Kumar.

== Personal life ==
Majumder's brother is Banaj Kumar Majumder, former chief of the Police Bureau of Investigation.
