= Farrokhzad =

Farrokhzād (Persian: فرّخزاد, meaning descendant of Farrokh or born with luck, happiness, and bless). It is a name of Persian origin, and derived from ancient Persian literature protagonist(Rostam Farrokhzad). It is an elegant and authentic surname in Iran, may refer to the following:

== People ==
- Rostam Farrokhzād, the 7th-century commander of Sasanian forces who lost the battle of Qadisiyya to Arab Muslims
- Farrukhzad, a 7th-century powerful Iranian aristocrat from the House of Ispahbudhan, who established the Bavand dynasty in Tabaristan, ruling from 651 to 665.
- Farrokhzad i Gushnanoshan, an Iranian lord of the late 7th century who, under the authority of al-Muhallab ibn Abi Sufra, served as the sub-governor of several cities in the Fars province, including Istakhr.
- Forough Farrokhzad, a 20th-century Iranian poet
- Fereydoun Farrokhzad, brother of Forough Farrokhzad and an Iranian TV host and political opposition figure who was murdered in 1992
- Pooran Farrokhzad, sister of Forough and an Iranian novelist
- Athena Farrokhzad, a Swedish-Iranian poet, playwright, translator and literary critic

== Places ==
- Farrokhzad, Khuzestan, a village in Khuzestan Province, Iran
- Farrokhzad, West Azerbaijan, a village in West Azerbaijan Province, Iran

== See also ==
- Farrokh (disambiguation)
