= Banaj Kumar Majumder =

Bangladeshi police officer

- বনজ কুমার মজুমদার

3rd Chief of Police Bureau of Investigation
- In office 31 March 2016 – 19 July 2024
- Appointed by: Minister of Home Affairs
- Preceded by: Barrister Mahbubur Rahman
- Succeeded by: Md Tawfique Mahbub Chowdhury

Personal details
- Born: January 1, 1967 (age 59) Pirojpur, Bangladesh
- Relations: Mihir Kanti Majumder (brother)
- Education: Rajshahi University of Engineering & Technology Police Training Bangladesh Police Academy
- Profession: Police officer
- Awards: Bangladesh Police Medal (BPM); President Police Medal (PPM)
- Police career
- Allegiance: Bangladesh
- Branch: Bangladesh Police
- Service years: 1991–2024
- Status: Retired
- Rank: Addl. IGP

Banaj Kumar Majumder (Bengali: বনজ কুমার মজুমদার; born 1 January 1967) is a Bangladeshi retired police officer. He was an additional IGP of the Bangladesh Police and former chief of the Police Bureau of Investigation. Prior to joining PBI, he was additional commissioner of Chattogram Metropolitan Police in the rank of additional DIG. He came into the limelight when he was SP of Cox's Bazar District.

== Early life ==
Majumder completed his graduation from Rajshahi University of Engineering and Technology (RUET) in electrical and electronic engineering. He joined the Bangladesh Police through the 12th BCS (Police) Batch in 1991.

== Career ==
In 2002, Majumder was the additional superintendent of police in Jhenaidah District. He was then transferred to the Armed Police Battalion of Chittagong District.

In 2009 and 2010, Majumder was the deputy commissioner of the northern section of the Chittagong Metropolitan Police.

Majumder, then additional commissioner of Chattogram Metropolitan Police, provided financial assistance to the family of a constable killed in the line of duty in 2013.

In March 2016, Majumder was promoted to the rank of deputy inspector general of police while serving as the additional commissioner of Chattogram Metropolitan Police. On 22 January 2022, Majumder was promoted to the rank of additional inspector general of police.

Majumder sued former Superintendent of Police Babul Akter and others in September 2022 after Akter alleged Majumder tortured him in police custody.

Majumder retired on 19 July 2024. His elder brother, Mihir Kanti Majumder, was a secretary of the government of Bangladesh who sought nomination from Awami League for the 12th parliamentary election.
