= Khandker Golam Faruq =

Bangladeshi police officer

34th Police Commissioner of Dhaka Metropolitan Police
- In office 29 October 2022 – 30 September 2023
- Appointed by: Minister of Home Affairs
- Preceded by: Shafiqul Islam
- Succeeded by: Habibur Rahman

Personal details
- Born: 1 October 1964 (age 62) Bhuapur, East Pakistan, Pakistan
- Education: Sher-e-Bangla Agricultural University Police Training Bangladesh Police Academy
- Awards: Bangladesh Police Medal; President Police Medal
- Police career
- Allegiance: Bangladesh
- Branch: Bangladesh Police
- Service years: 1991–2023
- Status: Retired
- Rank: Addl. IGP

Khandker Golam Faruq is a retired Bangladeshi police officer and an additional inspector general of police of the Bangladesh Police. He served as the 35th commissioner of DMP. Prior to joining there, he was the 13th rector of Police Staff College Bangladesh. Before that he served as principal of Bangladesh Police Academy, Sardah, Rajshahi. He is a former deputy inspector general of the Chittagong Range of Bangladesh Police.

== Early life and education ==
Faruq hailed from Ghatandi village in Bhuapur Upazila, Tangail District. He completed his graduation from Sher-e-Bangla Agricultural University. He holds a master's degree in political science from a private university.

== Career ==
Faruq joined the Bangladesh Police on 20 January 1991 with the 12th Bangladesh Civil Service batch. He served in the 4th Armed Police Battalion based in Bogra District. He then went on to serve in the Chittagong Metropolitan Police and Khagrachari District police.

Faruq was the superintendent of police of Thakurgaon District in 2005.

In 2006, Faruq was awarded the Bangladesh Police Medal. He served as the assistant superintendent of police of Dhaka District.

In 2015, Faruq was awarded the President Police Medal. He was the additional deputy inspector general of police of the Dhaka Range when the Ashulia bank robbery was carried out in 2015 by Ansarullah Bangla Team. In 2016, Faruq was promoted to deputy inspector general of police from additional inspector general of police while serving as the joint commissioner of the Dhaka Metropolitan Police.

Al Jazeera showed a video of arsonists burning down homes of Santals, a tribal minority, in Gaibandha District in the presence of police officers of Rangpur Range in 2016; Faruq denied police were involved. In 2017, while Faruq was the deputy inspector general of police of the Rangpur Range, member of parliament Manzurul Islam Liton was murdered in Gaibandha, which falls under the Rangpur Range. In 2017, he arrested a Hindu man whose Facebook post, which allegedly "defamed prophet Mohammad", led to Hindu properties being attacked by Muslims.

Faruq was awarded the Bangladesh Police Medal again in 2018. In 2019, Awami League supporters gangraped a woman, who supported the opposition Bangladesh Nationalist Party, during election night. Faruq visited the victim, who was living in Noakhali District under the Chittagong Range commanded by Faruq.

Faruq also served as the SP in Mymensingh, Jamalpur, Kishoreganj, Jhalakathi and Thakurgaon.

Faruq, deputy inspector general of Chittagong Range, was moved to Cox's Bazar to oversee the police following the murder of Major Sinha Mohammed Rashed Khan. In September 2020, he was transferred to the Bangladesh Police Academy as its principal. He was promoted to additional inspector general of police in November 2020. He requested Cabinet Secretary Khandker Anwarul Islam to seek an opinion from police officers before appointing public prosecutors in lower courts.

On 23 October 2022, the government appointed him as the next commissioner of the Dhaka Metropolitan Police after Md. Shafiqul Islam retires. He attended the International Association of Police Academies conference in 2022 held at the Bangladesh Police Staff College. Prime Minister Sheikh Hasina spoke at the event and was received by Faruq in September. After the fall of the Sheikh Hasina-led Awami League government, a travel ban was imposed on him and his wife.
