= Mahbubur Rahman (police officer) =

- মাহবুবুর রহমান

14th Chief Executive of Criminal Investigation Department
- In office 5 May 2020 – 30 July 2022
- Appointed by: Minister of Home Affairs
- Preceded by: Chowdhury Abdullah Al-Mamun
- Succeeded by: Mohammad Ali Mia

2nd Chief Executive of Police Bureau of Investigation
- In office 4 June 2015 – 31 March 2016
- Appointed by: Minister of Home Affairs
- Preceded by: Md. Shahabuddin Qureshi
- Succeeded by: Banaj Kumar Majumder

24th Police Commissioner of Rajshahi Metropolitan Police
- In office 21 October 2013 – 20 November 2014
- Appointed by: Minister of Home Affairs
- Preceded by: SM Monir-uz-Zaman
- Succeeded by: Md. Shamsuddin

Personal details
- Born: Bangladesh
- Education: University of Dhaka Police Training Bangladesh Police Academy
- Awards: President Police Medal (PPM)
- Police career
- Allegiance: Bangladesh
- Branch: Bangladesh Police
- Service years: 1989-2022
- Status: retired
- Rank: Addl. IGP

Barrister Mahbubur Rahman is a retired Bangladeshi police officer and the former chief of the Criminal Investigation Department.

== Early life and education ==
Rahman completed his graduate studies at the University of Dhaka in 1985.

In 2009, Rahman completed his law degree from a university in the United Kingdom and joined Lincoln's Inn.

== Career ==
Rahman joined the Bangladesh Civil Service in December 1989 as an assistant superintendent of police. From 1991 to 1995, he served as the assistant police commissioner of the Khulna Metropolitan Police and later the Dhaka Metropolitan Police. In 1997, he served in the United Nations peacekeeping force in Angola and in Kosovo in 1999.

Rahman served as the superintendent of police of Chittagong District, Dhaka District, and Tangail District. In January 2008, he was serving as the superintendent of police of Dhaka District and was elected general secretary of the Bangladesh Police Service Association. He was promoted to assistant inspector general and later additional deputy inspector general of police on 26 May 2011 and stationed in the Dhaka Metropolitan Police in 2011. He was the joint commissioner of traffic of the Dhaka Metropolitan Police in 2011.

From October 2013 to 20 November 2014, Rahman was the commissioner of Rajshahi Metropolitan Police. From 26 November 2014 to 4 June 2015, Rahman served as the additional police commissioner of the Dhaka Metropolitan Police.

From 4 June 2015 to 31 March 2016, Rahman served as the head of the Police Bureau of Investigation. He was then transferred to Bangladesh Police headquarters, where he worked as the head of the Interpol National Central Bureau. From 17 June 2019 to 5 May 2020, he served as the head of Highway Police. On 3 May 2020, he was appointed the chief of the Criminal Investigation Department. On 31 July 2021, he was made the additional inspector general of police for a term of one year on a contractual basis after reaching retirement age. The Criminal Investigation Department started its investigation against Pori Moni. His tenure at the Criminal Investigation Department was extended by one year by a circular issued by the Ministry of Public Administration and signed by Deputy Secretary Oliur Rahman.

Rahman sent a proposal to the Ministry of Home Affairs to establish a Cyber Police Station for the Criminal Investigation Department. He was sent into forced retirement after the fall of the Sheikh Hasina-led Awami League government.
