= Mohammad Ali Mia =

- মোহাম্মদ আলী মিয়া

15th Chief of Criminal Investigation Department
- In office 29 October 2022 – 13 August 2024
- Appointed by: Minister of Home Affairs
- Preceded by: Mahbubur Rahman
- Succeeded by: Matiur Rahman Sheikh

Personal details
- Born: Gopalganj, Bangladesh
- Education: MSS (Criminology); MSS (Economics); MBA (Human Resource Management)
- Awards: Bangladesh Police Medal (BPM); President Police Medal (PPM)
- Police career
- Allegiance: Bangladesh
- Branch: Bangladesh Police
- Service years: 1995–2024
- Status: Retired
- Rank: Addl. IGP

Mohammad Ali Mia is a retired Bangladeshi police officer who was additional inspector general of police in the Bangladesh Police. He served as the chief of the Criminal Investigation Department (CID). Earlier, he was the chief of the Tourist Police. He was posted in different posts of Bangladesh Police. Among them, he served as police's special branch (SB) DIG, Additional DIG of Dhaka Range, as well as SP of Habiganj and Manikganj districts.

== Early life ==
Mia is from Gopalganj District.

== Career ==
Mia joined the Bangladesh Police as an assistant superintendent of police on 15 November 1995. During the 2001 to 2006 Bangladesh Nationalist Party government, he was sidelined for being from Gopalganj. He served in the Criminal Investigation Department as an additional superintendent of police. In 2007, he was stationed at a diplomatic mission of Bangladesh.

In 2007, Mia was the deputy commissioner of traffic of Chittagong Metropolitan Police. He took action against 1500 illegal tuktuks and praised the media for their reporting that brought attention to the issue. Mia served as the superintendent of police of Narsingdi District, Manikganj District, and Habiganj District.

In 2013, Mia was serving as the additional DIG of Special Branch when he was transferred to Rajshahi Range Police.

Mia was made the chief of the Criminal Investigation Department on 23 August 2022. He had been serving as the head of the Tourist Police after replacing Mahbubur Rahman. As CID chief, he talked about his intention to crack down on Hundi networks due to the volatile situation of the foreign currency exchange market in Bangladesh. He played a critical role in uncovering the illegal Hundi businesses carried out by the MFS agents and their distribution houses. Furthermore, he spearheaded CID in targeting different financial institutions, organized crime syndicates, real estate firms, trade-based sectors, and even non-profitable organizations on allegations of money laundering. He enhanced and expanded the services of the Cyber Monitoring Cell of CID to combat cybercrime rackets such as fraud apps, Ponzi scheme-based e-commerce websites, betting apps, etc. He led the initiative in the drive against medical examination question paper leakers who had been active in their criminal operation for the last 16 years.

Mia was sent into forced retirement after the fall of the Sheikh Hasina-led Awami League government.
