= Md. Matiur Rahman Sheikh =

Bangladeshi police chief

Md. Matiur Rahman Sheikh is a Bangladeshi police officer who was head of the Criminal Investigation Department.

== Career ==
Sheikh joined the 12th batch of the Bangladesh Civil Service as a police cadre in 1991. He has been SP of four different districts, namely Khagrachhori, Rajbari, Bogra and Cox's Bazar.

In April 2013, Sheikh was transferred to the Police Staff College, Bangladesh. He was the commandant of Police Training Centre, Noakhali.

After the fall of the Sheikh Hasina-led Awami League government, Sheikh was appointed head of the Criminal Investigation Department in October 2024. He was promoted to additional inspector general of police while serving at the Police Staff College. He had been promoted after the change in government. The former head of the department, Mohammad Ali Mia, was sent into forced retirement.

On 9 March 2025, Sheikh was transferred to the Bangladesh Police headquarters, and Deputy Inspector General Gazi Jasim Uddin was appointed the new head of the Criminal Investigation Department. He was the additional inspector general of police (administration) of the Bangladesh Police. That is when he received the Grade 1 title. He is a board member of the Community Bank Bangladesh PLC. He was the president of the Bangladesh Police Service Association. In May 2025, he retired.
