= Abilov =

Abilov is a surname. Notable people with the surname include:

- Igbal Abilov (born 1989), scientific researcher, Talysh scholar and educator
- Atakhan Abilov (born 1965), Azerbaijani lawyer and activist
- Bulat Abilov (born 1957), Kazakhstani politician
- Fetislyam (Anatoly) Abilov (1915–2005), World War II commander
- Ismail Abilov (born 1951), Bulgarian sport wrestler
