= Sheikh Hemayet Hossain Mia =

Chief of Criminal Investigation Department
- In office 15 January 2015 – May 2019
- Preceded by: Md. Mokhlesur Rahman
- Succeeded by: Shafiqul Islam

Additional Inspector General, Armed Police Battalion

Personal details
- Born: Faridpur District, Bangladesh
- Police career
- Allegiance: Bangladesh
- Branch: Bangladesh Police
- Service years: 1986 – 2019
- Status: Retired
- Rank: Additional Inspector General
- Awards: Bangladesh Police Medal (2017); President Police Medal (2018)

Sheikh Hemayet Hossain Mia is a retired Bangladeshi police officer and former head of the Criminal Investigation Department. Earlier, he served as an additional inspector general of police at the Armed Police Battalion.

== Early life ==
Mia is from Faridpur District.

== Career ==
From 28 September 1998 to 16 May 2001, Mia was the superintendent of police of Khagrachari District.

Mia was denied promotion during the 2001 to 2006 Bangladesh Nationalist Party government along with officers from Gopalganj District and Hindu officers as they were perceived to be loyal to the opposition party, Awami League. In 2001, he was the superintendent of police of Jhalakathi District. He was then transferred to Rajshahi Metropolitan Police in 2004 as deputy commissioner and denied promotion while everyone in his batch received promotion. He was promoted to additional deputy inspector general after his entire batch had been promoted to deputy inspector general, and he was then posted to the Barisal Police range. He was then stationed at Police Training Center, Rangpur.

On 15 January 2015, Mia was appointed head of the Criminal Investigation Department. He had been serving in the Armed Police Battalion as additional inspector general of police. He inaugurated a new office of the Criminal Investigation Department at Joypurhat District. In 2017, he was awarded the Bangladesh Police Medal. He received the President Police Medal in 2018.

Mia retired in May 2019 and was replaced by Shafiqul Islam as head of the Criminal Investigation Department.
