= Farukh (disambiguation) =

Farukh may refer to:

== Given name ==
- Farukh Abitov (born 1988), Kyrgyz footballer
- Farukh Choudhary (born 1996), Indian footballer
- Farukh Khan, Pakistani politician
- Farukh Qureshi (born 1986), Norwegian politician
- Farukh Ruzimatov (born 1963), Uzbek-Russian ballet dancer

== Places ==
- Farukh, a village in Askeran
