= Md Tawfique Mahbub Chowdhury =

Bangladeshi police officer

4th Chief of Police Bureau of Investigation
- In office 13 August 2024 – 24 October 2024
- Appointed by: Minister of Home Affairs
- Preceded by: Banaj Kumar Majumder
- Succeeded by: Md Mustafa Kamal

Md. Tawfique Mahbub Chowdhury is a Bangladeshi police officer and principal of the Bangladesh Police Academy. He is an additional IGP (Development) of the Bangladesh Police at Police Headquarters. Earlier, he was chief of the Police Bureau of Investigation. Before that, he was additional IGP (development) at Police Headquarters.

== Career ==
In 2007, Chowdhury was transferred from the Deputy Commissioner of Chittagong Metropolitan Police to Superintendent of Police of Barisal District. He was next appointed deputy commissioner of the Dhaka Metropolitan Police.

In February 2024, Chowdhury, while serving at the Bangladesh Police headquarters, was promoted to the rank of Additional Inspector General. After the fall of the Sheikh Hasina led Awami League government, he was appointed chief of the Police Bureau of Investigation. After which he served as the additional Inspector General (development) of Bangladesh Police and a director of the Community Bank. In May 2025, he was appointed principal of the Bangladesh Police Academy.
