= Shafiqul Islam (police officer) =

Bangladeshi police officer (born 1962)

33rd Police Commissioner of Dhaka Metropolitan Police
- In office 14 September 2019 – 29 October 2022
- Appointed by: Minister of Home Affairs
- Preceded by: Asaduzzaman Mia
- Succeeded by: Khandker Golam Faruq

Chief of Criminal Investigation Department
- In office 16 May 2019 – 13 September 2019
- Preceded by: Sheikh Hemayet Hossain Mia
- Succeeded by: Chowdhury Abdullah Al Mamun

26th Police Commissioner of Chattogram Metropolitan Police
- In office 2 May 2012 – 27 August 2014
- Appointed by: Minister of Home Affairs
- Preceded by: Mohammad Abul Kashem
- Succeeded by: Md. Abdul Jalil Mandal

Personal details
- Born: 30 October 1962 (age 63) Chuadanga, East Pakistan, Pakistan
- Education: Police Training Bangladesh Police Academy
- Police career
- Allegiance: Bangladesh
- Branch: Bangladesh Police
- Service years: 1989 - 2022
- Status: Retired
- Rank: Addl. IGP

Shafiqul Islam (born 30 October 1962) is a retired police officer who served as the 34th police commissioner of Dhaka Metropolitan Police. He was made the DMP commissioner on 14 September 2019. He previously served as the chief of the Criminal Investigation Department.

== Early life ==
Islam was born on 30 October 1962 at Alamdanga in Chuadanga District of the then East Pakistan (now Bangladesh). He graduated in agriculture from Sher-e-Bangla Agricultural University in 1984. He joined the Bangladesh Police force on 20 December 1987 through the 8th BCS Examination.

== Career ==
Islam joined the Bangladesh Police as the assistant superintendent of police through the 8th BCS. In his career he served as superintendent of railway police of Saidpur, Narayanganj District, 8th Armed Police Battalion of Sylhet District, Patuakhali District, Police Staff College, 2nd Armed Police Battalion of Chittagong District, Sunamganj District, and Comilla District.

Being additional deputy inspector general, Islam served as additional commissioner of police, Chittagong Metropolitan Police. Later, as DIG, he served as commissioner of Chittagong Metropolitan Police. He had previously been the deputy inspector general of Chittagong Range and Dhaka Range. In 2015, he was transferred from commissioner of Chittagong Metropolitan Police to the deputy inspector general of Telecommunication & Information Management.

After being promoted to the rank of additional inspector general, he served as additional IG of the Anti-Terrorism Unit, additional IG (HRM) at Police Headquarters, and additional IG of the Criminal Investigation Department. He had been appointed chief of the Criminal Investigation Department in May 2019. He took the charge of commissioner, Dhaka Metropolitan Police, on 7 September 2019. He was elected president of the Bangladesh Police Service Association in January 2020. In October 2021, his term at the Dhaka Metropolitan Police was extended by one year. He reported to the media that some citizens of Bangladesh had gone to Afghanistan to join the Taliban. He retired from active police service on 29 October 2022. He has been appointed as a member of the Bangladesh Public Service Commission (BPSC) on 12 May 2023.
