= Abitovo =

Abitovo Абитово Әбет Äbet
- Village
- Location within Bashkortostan Location within Russia
- Coordinates: 53°00′N 56°20′E
- Country: Russia
- Region: Bashkortostan
- District: Meleuzovsky District
- Time zone: [[UTC+5:00]]

Abitovo (Russian: Абитово; Bashkir: Әбет, Äbet) is a rural locality (a village) in Abitovsky Selsoviet of Meleuzovsky District, Bashkortostan, Russia. Its population was 222 as of 2010. There are three streets in the village.

== Geography ==
Abitovo is located 33 km east of Meleuz (the district's administrative centre) by road. Itkuchukovo is the nearest rural locality.

== Ethnicity ==
The village is inhabited by Bashkirs.
