= Bangladesh Sericulture Research and Training Institute =

Government organization in Rajshahi, Bangladesh

- Formation: 1898
- Headquarters: Rajshahi, Bangladesh
- Region served: Bangladesh
- Official language: Bengali
- Website: www.bsrti.gov.bd

The Bangladesh Sericulture Research and Training Institute is an autonomous national research institute that carries out research on sericulture (silk farming) and supports the sericulture industry in Bangladesh. The organization is located in the city of Rajshahi.

== History ==
The institute traces its origins to the Silk Institute that was established in Rajshahi in 1898, during the colonial British Raj period.

During the post-colonial East Pakistan period (1955–1971) there were two institutes, the Silk Research Institute and Silk Technology Institute.

Following national independence, the institutes were merged to form Silk Research and Training Institute in 1974. Now renamed the Sericulture Research and Training Institute, it is under the Bangladesh Sericulture Board. The institute is the only one in Bangladesh specializing in silk research. It has developed a number of high yielding Mulberry plant cultivars and silkworms.

== See also ==
- Silk production
- Textile industry in Bangladesh
