= Gazi Jasim Uddin =

Additional Inspector General of Industrial Police (Bangladesh)
- Incumbent
- Assumed office May 2025
- President: Mohammed Shahabuddin
- Prime Minister: Muhammad Yunus (acting)
- Preceded by: Sibgat Ullah

Personal details
- Born: Bangladesh
- Police career
- Allegiance: Bangladesh
- Branch: Bangladesh Police
- Service years: 1995-present
- Status: Active
- Rank: Additional IGP

Gazi Jasim Uddin is a Bangladeshi police officer and chief of the Industrial Police. He is the former chief of the Criminal Investigation Department.

== Early life ==
Uddin was the president of the Patuakhali District unit of the Bangladesh Islami Chhatra Shibir, the student wing of Bangladesh Jamaat-e-Islami.

== Career ==
In May 2004, Uddin, assistant police commissioner (detective branch) of the Chittagong Metropolitan Police, and Commissioner Amjad Hossain were summoned by the Election Commission for allegedly favouring the ruling party candidate Mir Mohammad Nasiruddin, a charge they denied.

Uddin was the deputy commissioner of the Khulna Metropolitan Police. In January 2007, he was appointed the superintendent of police of Sherpur District. He enjoyed favorable postings during the 2001 to 2006 rule of the Bangladesh Nationalist Party and Bangladesh Jamaat-e-Islami. He later served as the superintendent of police of Kushtia District.

After the fall of the Sheikh Hasina-led Awami League government, Uddin was promoted to deputy inspector general of police.

In March 2025, Uddin was appointed chief of the Criminal Investigation Department, replacing Md Matiur Rahman Sheikh. He was the director general of the Criminal Investigation Department. In May 2025, he was appointed head of the Industrial Police.
