= Farrukh Ahmad Chowdhury =

Farrukh Ahmad Chowdhury is a retired Bangladeshi police officer and former chief of the Criminal Investigation Department.

== Career ==
Chowdhury served as the chief of the Criminal Investigation Department from 23 January 2004 to 1 February 2005. He was succeeded by Mohammed Shamsul Islam. He was then appointed chief of the Special Branch, where he served until October 2006. His and Abdul Aziz Sarkar's, head of Rapid Action Battalion, appointments were cancelled by President Iajuddin Ahmed.

Chowdhury served as a prosecution witness in the 2004 arms and ammunition haul in Chittagong. He testified that former Minister of Home Affairs Lutfozzaman Babar asked Bangladesh Police not to investigate ties between the smuggled arms and the National Security Intelligence.
