= Farrukh Chela =

Indian painter

- Known for: Painting, miniatures
- Notable work: A Buffalo Fighting a Lioness (Leaf from the Muraqqa Gulshan); Shirin Receives a Ring from Khusraw, 1597 – 1598; The Punishment of Khwaja Mu'azzam, 1604

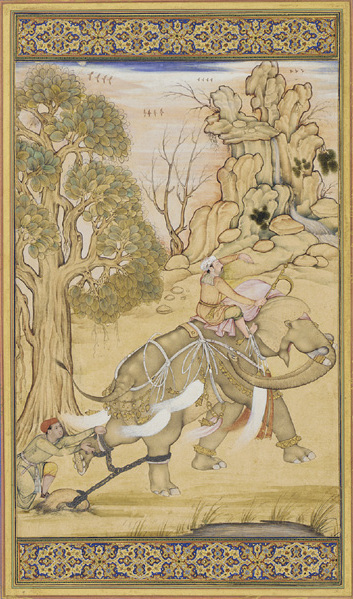
Farrukh Chela: Elephant and trainer, Gulshan Album (Rose Garden album) by Farrukh Beg. Freer Gallery, Washington, D.C., United States

Farrukh Chela (active from 1580 or 1585-1604) was an Indian miniature painter during the reign of Akbar, the third Mughal Emperor. As a prolific artist, he contributed to most of the major illustrated manuscripts at the Mughal court.

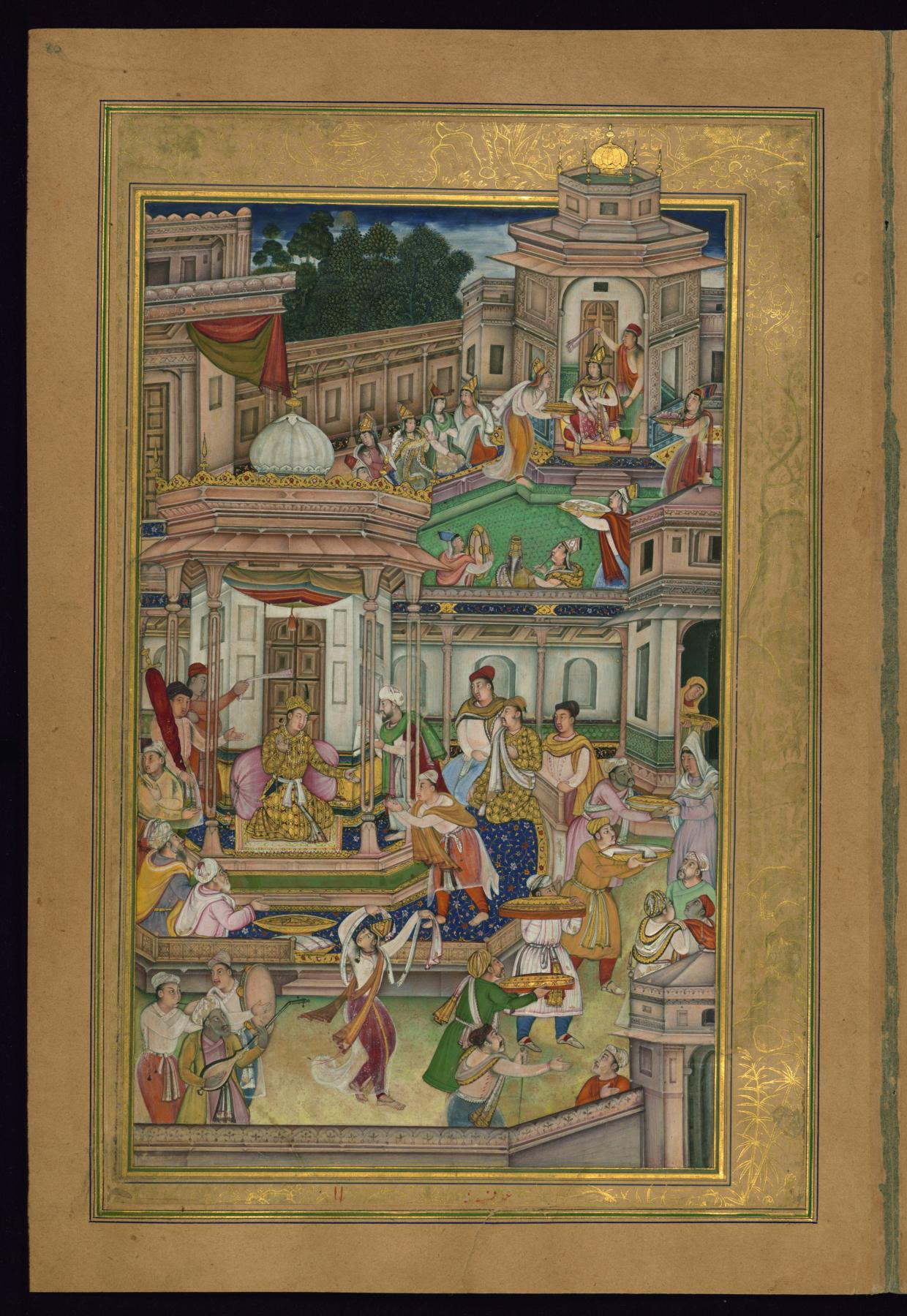
Farrukh Chela: Shirin Receives a Ring from Khusraw, 1597 – 1598. Walters Art Museum, Baltimore, United States.

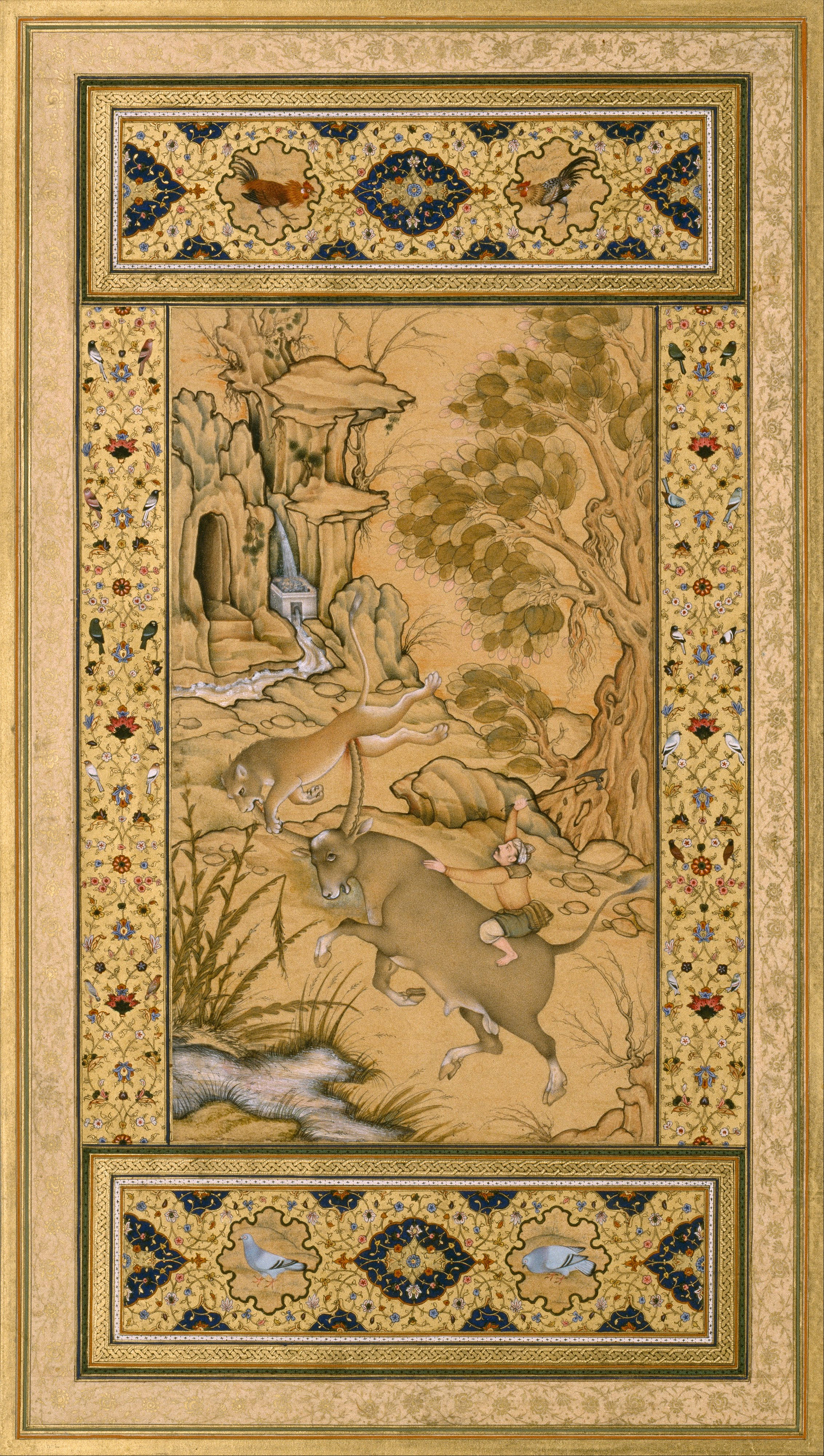
Farrukh Chela: A Buffalo Fighting a Lioness, 146 x 84 mm. Nelson-Atkins Museum of Art, Kansas City, United States.

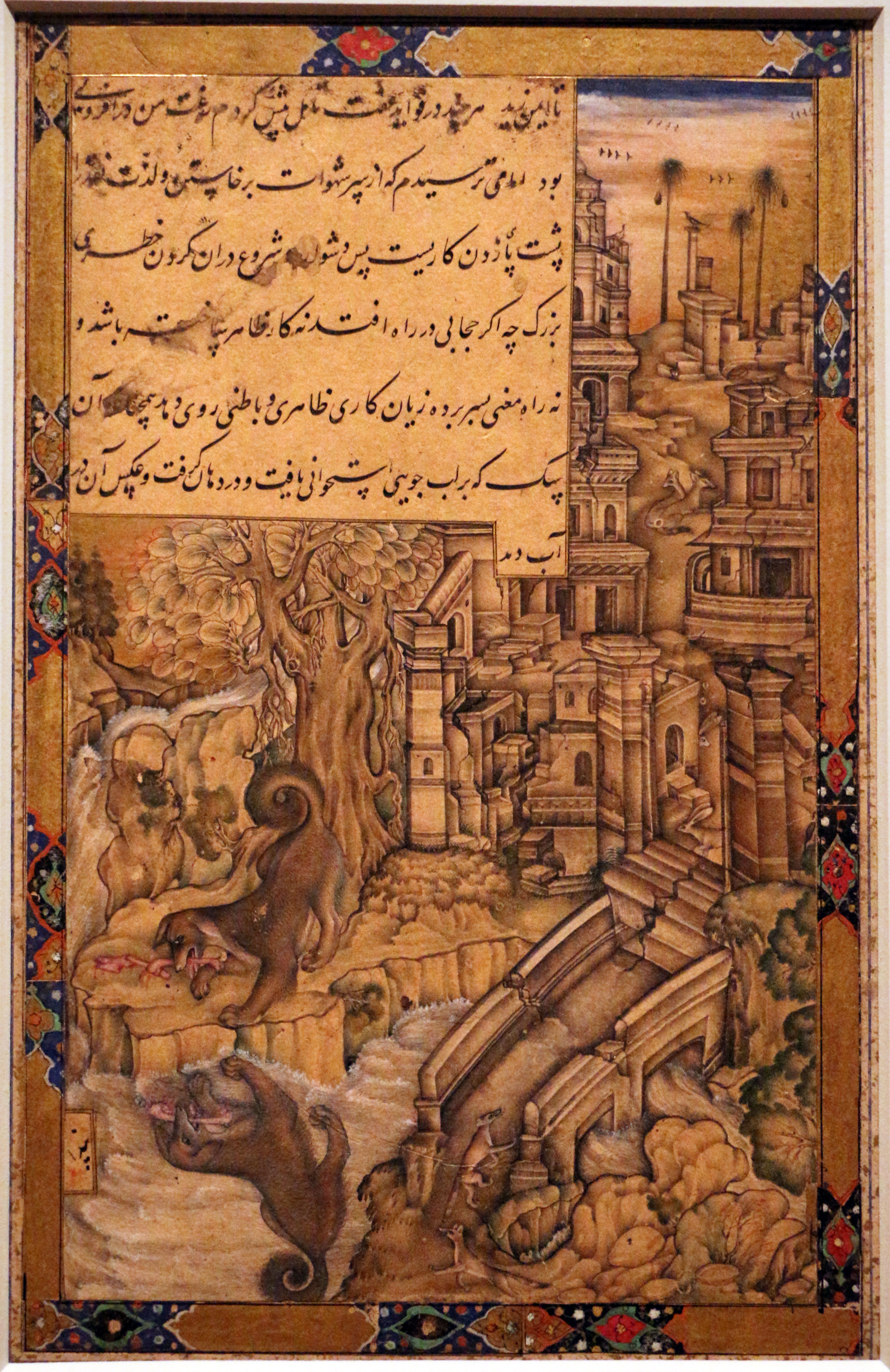
Farrukh Chela: The Greedy Dog, between 1575 and 1600. Art Institute of Chicago, United States.

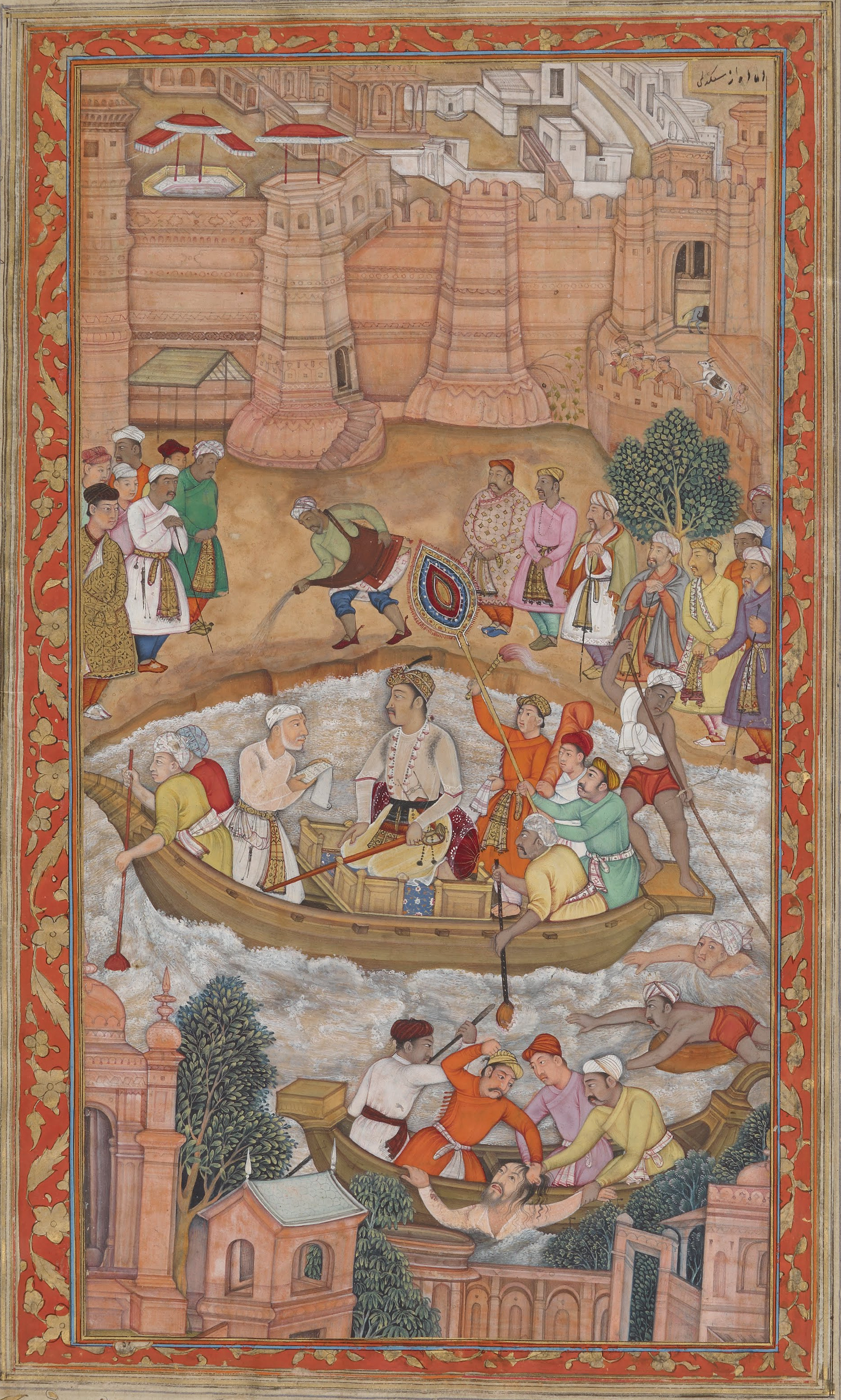
Farrukh Chela: The Punishment of Khwaja Mu'azzam, 231 x 125 mm, 1604. A page of the Chester Beatty illuminated Akbarnama manuscript. Chester Beatty (Library), Dublin.

== Museums ==
Chela's works are part of collections in the United States of the Art Institute of Chicago, Cincinnati Art Museum, Freer Gallery of Art in Washington, D.C., Nelson-Atkins Museum of Art in Kansas City, and Walters Art Museum in Baltimore, and in Ireland of Chester Beatty (Library) in Dublin.

== Literature ==
- Krishna, Anand (1971). A study of the akbari artist Farrukh Chela. Varanasi: Banaras Hindu University. OCLC 935163341.
- Krishna, Anand (2003). Farrukh Chela. Oxford Art Online. Oxford: Oxford University Press. doi:10.1093/gao/9781884446054.article.T027608. ISBN 9781884446054. OCLC 5104600895.
- Morris, Rekha (1982). "Some Additions to the Known Corpus of Paintings by the Mughal Artist Farrukh Chela". Ars Orientalis. 13: 135–151. ISSN 0571-1371. JSTOR 4629315. OCLC 9970092956. "Although Farrukh Chela was not considered a great artist either in his own time (the A'-in-i-Akbari does not include him among the seventeen foremost artists of the period) or in recent years, his style is so distinctive and idiosyncratic that it invites both interest and close examination."
- Verma, S. P. (1975). ""CHELA"—PAINTERS OF THE MUGHAL COURT". Proceedings of the Indian History Congress. 36. Indian History Congress: 345–352. JSTOR 44138860. "A good number of paintings produced in the court of Akbar bear names of artists who call themselves as chela."
- Verma, Som Prakash (2009). Interpreting Mughal painting : essays on art, society, and culture. Oxford collected essays. New Delhi: Oxford University Press. ISBN 9780195692570. OCLC 468237509.

== See also ==
- Mughal painting
