= Industrial Police (Bangladesh) =

Unit of Bangladesh Police

Industrial Police শিল্পাঞ্চল পুলিশ

Agency overview
- Formed: 2010

Jurisdictional structure
- Operations jurisdiction: Bangladesh
- Governing body: Ministry of Home Affairs
- General nature: Civilian police
- Specialist jurisdiction: Buildings and other fixed assets

Operational structure
- Headquarters: Sector - 4, House -3, Road-15 Uttara, Dhaka
- Elected officer responsible: Salahuddin Ahmed, Minister of Home Affairs
- Agency executive: Gazi Jashim Uddin, Addl. Inspector General
- Parent agency: Bangladesh Police
- Units: 9 units

Website
- industrialpolice.gov.bd
- Service uniform: Yankees Blue, Light French Beige Combat uniform: Navy Blue, Yankees Blue

The Industrial Police is a specialized unit of the Bangladesh Police responsible for providing security policing services to industrial zones of Bangladesh. Gazi Jasim Uddin has served as the chief of the Industrial Police since May 2024.

== History ==
In 2009, Prime Minister Sheikh Hasina announced plans for the formation of an Industrial Police in the Parliament. The initial proposal was turned down by the Ministry of Finance which recommended strengthening local police or using Bangladesh Ansar. Industrial Police was established on 4 October 2010 to protect industrial zones in Dhaka, Chittagong, Narayanganj, and Gazipur. The force started with 5000 personal deputed from Bangladesh Police and provided special training at the Police Staff College. The formation of the Industrial police resulted in mixed reactions with owners being optimistic while workers were more cautious.

The Industrial police is used to quell labor unrest in the garment industry of Bangladesh. The Unit is led by a director general from Bangladesh Police. In 2015, an Industrial police officer was assassinated at a police check-post in Ashulia by suspected Islamist terrorists.

=== Controversy ===
In November 2017, three police officers of the unit were arrested for abducting a pedestrian for ransom. The abductors were led by assistant sub-inspector Mokbul Hossen of the Dhaka unit.

The United has faced accusations of having too close ties with the Bangladesh Garment Manufacturers and Exporters Association. The association is reported to have donated vehicles to the unit. The workers having accused the unit of siding with garment factory owners in industrial disputes.

== List of Chiefs of Industrial Police ==
Name	Term start	Term end	Reference
Nawsher Ali, PPM	30 March 2017	20 January 2018	
Abdus Salam, PPM	19 January 2010, 29 January 2018	30 March 2017, 07 August 2020	
MD. Mahabubor Rahman, BPM, PPM	15 September 2020	24 May 2021	
MD. Shafiqul Islam, BPM (Bar), PPM	24 May 2021	10 February 2022	
MD. Mahabubor Rahman, BPM (Bar), PPM	10 February 2022	22 August 2024	
Gazi Jasim Uddin	May 2024	Current	

== Units ==
Units of Industrial Police:

Unit	Base	Jurisdiction
Industrial Police-1	Ashulia	Dhaka
Industrial Police-2	Gazipur	Gazipur
Industrial Police-3	Chattogram	Chattogram
Industrial Police-4	Narayanganj	Narayanganj
Industrial Police-5	Mymensingh	Mymensingh
Industrial Police-6	Khulna	Khulna
Industrial Police-7	Cumilla	Cumilla
Industrial Police-8	Sylhet	Sylhet
