= Farrukh Mukhamedov =

Uzbek mathematician and professor

- Born: Tashkent, Uzbekistan
- Education: National University of Uzbekistan; Institute of Mathematics, Tashkent
- Awards: Mathematics Prize of the Academy of Sciences of the Republic of Uzbekistan (1999); TWAS Prize for Young Scientists in Developing Countries (2005); Fellow of The World Academy of Sciences (elected 2022)
- Scientific career
- Fields: Mathematics, mathematical physics, operator theory, dynamical systems, quantum probability
- Workplaces: United Arab Emirates University; International Islamic University Malaysia; University of Aveiro; National University of Uzbekistan
- Thesis: Markov States and Quadratic Operators Defined on von Neumann Algebras

Farrukh Mukhamedov is an Uzbek mathematician and professor in the Department of Mathematical Sciences at United Arab Emirates University.

In 2005, he received The World Academy of Sciences (TWAS) prize for Young Scientists, and in 2022, he was elected a fellow member of TWAS in the mathematical sciences section and is a corresponding fellow of International Core Academy of Sciences and Humanities.

== Education ==
Mukhamedov obtained an MSc in pure mathematics with distinction from the National University of Uzbekistan and completed his PhD in 1998.

In 2005, he defended a DSc (Habilitation) degree, at the National University of Uzbekistan.

== Academic career ==
Mukhamedov worked as a graduate student at the Institute of Mathematics of the Academy of Sciences of Uzbekistan, a junior scientific fellow at the same institute, a postdoctoral researcher at the National University of Uzbekistan, an associate professor there, and a senior scientific fellow.

In 2005, Mukhamedov held a postdoctoral position at the University of Aveiro in Portugal. He subsequently joined the Faculty of Science at International Islamic University Malaysia, where he was promoted from associate professor to professor. From 2009 to 2015, Mukhamedov was a Junior Associate of the International Centre for Theoretical Physics (ICTP). In 2016, he joined the Department of Mathematical Sciences at the United Arab Emirates University as a professor.

== Research ==
Mukhamedov's research has contributed to several areas of pure mathematics, including quantum probability, ergodic theory, dynamical systems, and p-adic analysis. In quantum probability, he applied methods from statistical mechanics to establish the existence of phase transitions in quantum Markov chains and disproved a conjecture concerning the occurrence of type III₁ factors in systems with non-trivial Hamiltonian interactions. He developed the theory of quantum quadratic operators and related stochastic processes. In p-adic mathematics, Mukhamedov established results in p-adic statistical mechanics, including the study of phase transitions, and contributed to the development of p-adic dynamical systems by proving the existence of chaotic behavior in p-adic Potts models.

== Editorial activities ==
Mukhamedov has served on editorial boards of p-Adic Numbers, Ultrametric Analysis and Applications, Open Journal of Mathematical Analysis, Open Systems & Information Dynamics, and the Uzbek Mathematical Journal.

== Honours and fellowship ==
In 1999, Mukhamedov received the Mathematics Prize of the Academy of Sciences of the Republic of Uzbekistan. In 2005, he received the TWAS Prize for Young Scientists in Developing Countries.

Mukhamedov is a corresponding fellow of the International Core Academy of Sciences and Humanities (CORE Academy). In 2022, He was elected a fellow of The World Academy of Sciences in the mathematical sciences section. He is also a fellow of the Industry Academy of the International Artificial Intelligence Industry Alliance.

== Selected publications ==
- Mukhamedov, Farrukh; Rozikov, Utkir (2004). "On Gibbs measures of p-adic Potts model on the Cayley tree". Indagationes Mathematicae. 15 (1): 85–100. arXiv:math-ph/0510025. doi:10.1016/S0019-3577(04)90007-9.
- Mukhamedov, Farrukh; Rozikov, Utkir (2004). "On Gibbs Measures of Models with Competing Ternary and Binary Interactions and Corresponding von Neumann Algebras". Journal of Statistical Physics. 114 (3–4): 825–848. Bibcode:2004JSP...114..825M. doi:10.1023/B:JOSS.0000012509.10642.83.
- Mukhamedov, Farrukh; Akin, Hasan; Temir, Seyit (2005). "On infinite dimensional quadratic Volterra operators". Journal of Mathematical Analysis and Applications. 310 (2): 533–556. arXiv:math/0510338. Bibcode:2005JMAA..310..533M. doi:10.1016/j.jmaa.2005.02.022.
- Fidaleo, Francesco; Mukhamedov, Farrukh (2007). "Strict weak mixing of some C*-dynamical systems based on free shifts". Journal of Mathematical Analysis and Applications. 336 (1): 180–187. arXiv:math/0612025. Bibcode:2007JMAA..336..180F. doi:10.1016/j.jmaa.2007.02.066.
- Ganikhodzhaev, Rasul; Mukhamedov, Farrukh; Rozikov, Utkir (2011). "Quadratic stochastic operators and processes: Results and open problems". Infinite Dimensional Analysis, Quantum Probability and Related Topics. 14 (2): 279–335. arXiv:0902.4207. doi:10.1142/S0219025711004365.
- Mukhamedov, Farrukh; Ganikhodjaev, Nasir (2015). Quantum Quadratic Operators and Processes. Lecture Notes in Mathematics. Vol. 2133. Springer. doi:10.1007/978-3-319-22837-2. ISBN 978-3-319-22836-5.
- Dhahri, Ameur; Mukhamedov, Farrukh (2019). "Open quantum random walks, quantum Markov chains and recurrence". Reviews in Mathematical Physics. 31 (7) 1950020. arXiv:1608.01065. Bibcode:2019RvMaP..3150020D. doi:10.1142/S0129055X1950020X.
- Mukhamedov, Farrukh; Qaralleh, Izzat; Qaisar, Taimun; Alhaj Hasan, Mahmoud (2023). "Genetic Algebras Associated with ξ(a)-Quadratic Stochastic Operators". Entropy. 25 (6): 934. doi:10.3390/e25060934. PMC 10297585. PMID 37372278.
- Souissi, Abdessatar; Mukhamedov, Farrukh (2024). "Nonlinear Stochastic Operators and Associated Inhomogeneous Entangled Quantum Markov Chains". Journal of Nonlinear Mathematical Physics. 31 (1) 11. Bibcode:2024JNMP...31...11S. doi:10.1007/s44198-024-00172-6.
