= Farrokh Ayazi =

Iranian academic

Farrokh Ayazi is a professor, the director of the Georgia Tech Analog Consortium and the Ken Byers Professor at the Georgia Institute of Technology in Atlanta. He was named Fellow of the Institute of Electrical and Electronics Engineers (IEEE) in 2013 for contributions to micro-electro-mechanical resonators and resonant gyroscopes.

Ayazi is the co-founder and Chief Technology Officer (CTO) of Qualtré Inc.

== Education ==
- B.S. degree in electrical engineering from the University of Tehran, Iran, in 1994
- M.S. and the Ph.D. degrees in electrical engineering from the University of Michigan, Ann Arbor, in 1997 and 2000, respectively.
