= Farrokh Khambata =

Indian chef and restaurateur

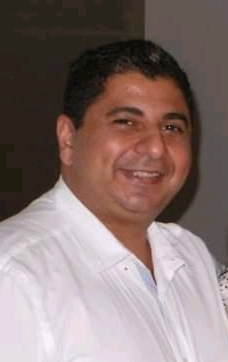
- Chef Farrokh Khambata
- Born: Mumbai, Maharashtra, India
- Education: Institute of Hotel Management, Catering Technology and Applied Nutrition (IHMCTAN), Mumbai
- Spouse: Dilshad Khambata
- Culinary career
- Cooking style: Indian Cuisine; Oriental Cuisine; Lebanese Cuisine; Japanese Cuisine
- Previous restaurants: Catering & Allied - (2002 - 2020); Amadeus - NCPA (July 2011 - 2020); Cafe at the NCPA - NCPA (Jan 2012 - 2020); Umame - Cambata Bldg Churchgate (Sept 2012 - 2020); Joss - Santacruz (Aug 2014 - 2020); Izaya - NCPA (Nov 2018 - 2020); Rampart Row Banquets; Joss - KalaGhoda (2004-2011); Jaan at the Penthouse - Sofitel, Dubai (Nov 2016 - 2017)
- Award won: Times Food Award Mumbai - (2008, 2010, 2012, 2013, 2014, 2015, 2016)
- Website: josshospitality.com

Farrokh Khambata is an Indian entrepreneur, restaurateur, chef and caterer. He is the founder and CEO of Catering & Allied, a company which owned and operated restaurants in Mumbai. He also ran a catering business, Joss Catering Services, which specialized in celebrity catering. In September 2024 he was reported missing by his wife and then in January 2025 accused of forging her signature to take out loans. Police believe he has fled India.

== Early life ==
Farrokh Khambata was born and raised in a Parsi family in Mumbai. His parents were accountants in the financial sector. He was educated at St. Mary's School, ICSE, Mumbai.

Khambata finished school at the age of 16 and pursued a career in science at K.C. College. After graduating from junior college he began studying architecture, but soon dropped out and joined the Institute of Hotel Management, Catering Technology and Applied Nutrition, Mumbai to pursue cooking.

== Career ==
In September 2012, Farrokh opened a Far Eastern cuisine restaurant, Umame.

In July 2014, Farrokh launched his restaurant JOSS in Santacruz, Mumbai

In 2016, Farrokh launched Jaan at the Penthouse at the Sofitel in Dubai, which has since closed.

In November 2018, he launched a Thai robata fine dining restaurant named IZAYA, at the National Centre for the Performing Arts (NCPA) in Nariman Point, Mumbai. This same complex housed two other ventures - a lounge named Amadeus and a café aptly named Cafe At the NCPA.

As of December 2020, all of the restaurants have closed due to the extensive lockdown in Mumbai caused by the COVID-19 pandemic.

== Disappearance and fraud ==
Farrokh's wife Dilshad reported her husband missing to the Gamdevi police on September 20, 2024. According to the first information report (FIR), Farrokh had failed to return home since April 5, 2024.

On 27 January 2025, Dilshad filed a case of forgery against Farrokh at the Gamdevi police station in Mumbai claiming he had taken loans, amounting to ₹60 lakh (US$71,000), from various financial institutions forging her signatures, making her a co-borrower in the loans without her consent.

A woman pretending to be Farrokh's wife Dilshad helped the celebrity chef secure a business loan of around INR 40 lakh from a private bank in Andheri-Mumbai, according to the police’s charge sheet filed with the Metropolitan Magistrate Court.

The Mumbai Police have stated that they have issued a look-out circular (LOC) notice against Farrokh, who is believed to have fled India to the Philippines.
