= Fetislyam Abilov =

Soviet Crimean Tatar military commander (1915–2005)

Fetislyam "Fetay" Abilovich Abilov Anatoly Abilovich Abilov
- Crimean Tatar: Fetislâm Abil oğlu Abilov; Russian: Анатолий Абилович Абилов
- Born: 15 March 1915; Dzhadra-Sheikh-Eli village, Taurida Governorate, Crimea
- Died: 15 August 2005 (aged 90); Zhukovsky, Russia
- Military career
- Allegiance: Soviet Union
- Branch: Red Army
- Service years: 1937 – 1947
- Rank: Colonel
- Unit: 44th Guards Rifle Division
- Conflicts: World War II
- Awards: Hero of the Soviet Union

Fetislyam "Petay" Abilovich Abilov (15 March 1915 – 15 August 2005), who lived under the name Anatoly for most of his life, was a Soviet Army officer who served as the commander of the 130th Guards Rifle Regiment during the Second World War. He was awarded the title Hero of the Soviet Union in 1990 after being nominated twice during the war years but rejected because of his Crimean Tatar nationality.

== Early life ==
Abilov was born in 1915 to a Crimean Tatar peasant family in the village of Dzhadra-Sheikh-Eli on the Crimean peninsula, then part of the Russian Empire. After completing seven grades of school he worked in metallurgy and as a tractor driver on a state-owned farm until entering the Red Army in 1937. In 1939 he completed infantry school in Tbilisi, and in 1942 he became a member of the Communist party.

== World War II ==
Abilov was sent to the front lines of World War II in July 1941 while holding the rank of captain as the deputy commander of a rifle battalion, immediately after the German invasion of the Soviet Union. In September 1942 he was appointed as commander of the 1292nd Rifle Regiment, and remained its commander until 8 June 1943. That year he completed accelerated courses at the M. V. Frunze Military Academy, after which he was assigned as commander of the 130th Guards Rifle Regiment of the 44th Guards Rifle Division. Under his command the regiment broke through enemy defenses on the Narew River and went on to hold a bridgehead from which they inflicted a high degree of damage against enemy forces; killed an estimated 600 enemy soldiers and captured 150 enemy horses in Baranavichy on 8 July 1944; pursued retreating German troops across Eastern and Central Europe, taking enemy equipment in the process; expelled Axis forces from more than 70 settlements in offensive with two other regiments from the division; and broke through heavily fortified areas covered by minefields and trenches. He was wounded in battle three times but survived the war, and he was nominated for the title Hero of the Soviet Union twice during the war (in 1944 and in 1945) but was not awarded it at the time.

== Later life ==
In 1947 he was demobilized from active duty and discharged into the reserve. Unlike most Crimean Tatar veterans of the war, Abilov was not deported to Central Asia, as he was living under the Russian name of Anatoly. In 1964 he became the chief of staff and deputy director at the experiment engineering and civil defense plant of Zhukovsky. He was a member of the presidium of the council of veterans, and on 5 May 1990 he was belatedly declared a Hero of the Soviet Union. He died on 15 August 2005 and was buried in the Bykovsky cemetery.

== Awards ==
- Hero of the Soviet Union
- Order of Lenin
- Four Orders of the Red Banner
- Order of Suvorov 3rd Class
- Order of Kutuzov 3rd Class
- Order of the Patriotic War 1st Class
- Honorary Citizen of Zhukovsky
