= Md. Mustafa Kamal =

- মো. মোস্তফা কামাল

5th Chief of Police Bureau of Investigation
- Incumbent
- Assumed office May 2025
- President: Mohammed Shahabuddin
- Prime Minister: Muhammad Yunus (acting)

Personal details
- Born: Bangladesh
- Police career
- Allegiance: Bangladesh
- Branch: Bangladesh Police
- Service years: 1995-present
- Status: Active
- Rank: Additional IGP

Md. Mustafa Kamal (born 10 October 1970) is a Bangladeshi police officer and the additional inspector general of police (Addl. IGP) serving as the director general (chief) of the Police Bureau of Investigation (PBI), a specialized unit of the Bangladesh Police. He assumed leadership of the PBI in October 2024 and was subsequently promoted to the rank of additional inspector general in May 2025.

== Early life and education ==
Kamal was born on 10 October 1970 in Mymensingh, Bangladesh. He completed his higher education with a master's degree in mass communication and journalism from the University of Dhaka.

== Police career ==
He joined the Bangladesh Civil Service (BCS) Police Cadre in 1995 as part of the 15th batch. After completing foundational training at the Bangladesh Police Academy, Sarada, and field training in Brahmanbaria District, he began his career in the Dhaka Metropolitan Police as an assistant police commissioner in July 1997. He served in various capacities within Bangladesh Police, gaining experience across multiple operational and leadership roles.

His career assignments have included:

- Assistant commissioner and later additional deputy commissioner in Dhaka Metropolitan Police
- Additional superintendent of police in Dinajpur District
- Superintendent of police in Habiganj and Chandpur Districts
- Deputy commissioner (DC) with responsibilities in Chittagong Metropolitan Police
- Commanding officer (CO) of the 3rd, 5th, and 9th Battalions of the Armed Police Battalion (APBn)
- Special superintendent of police (SP) and deputy inspector general (DIG) roles within PBI prior to chief appointment

Internationally, Kamal has represented Bangladesh in six United Nations peacekeeping missions as a contingent commander, including stints in East Timor (UNTAET, UNMISET), Kosovo (UNMIK), the Democratic Republic of Congo (MONUC, MONUSCO), and Darfur, Sudan (UNAMID). His performance in these missions earned him recognition and led to multiple IGP's Exemplary Good Service Badges.

=== Director general of PBI ===
On 24 October 2024, the government of Bangladesh appointed Md. Mustafa Kamal as the head of the Police Bureau of Investigation (PBI) with the acting rank of additional inspector general. This unit conducts specialized criminal investigations on behalf of courts, police headquarters, and other law enforcement agencies. Later, on 19 May 2025, he received a formal promotion to additional inspector general (grade-2), an advancement recognized by the Bangladesh Police leadership during an official ceremony.

== Personal life ==
Md. Mustafa Kamal is married and has two daughters and one son.
