= Farukh Abitov =

Kyrgyzstani footballer

Personal information
- Date of birth: 4 December 1988 (age 37)
- Place of birth: Kyrgyzstan, Soviet Union
- Position: Defender

Senior career*
Years	Team	Apps	(Gls)
2003	Alay Osh	2	(0)
2004–2005	Kyrgyzstan U21	?	(1)
2006	Muras-Sport Bishkek	?	(1)
2007–2014	Dordoi Bishkek	?	(1)
2017	Alga Bishkek	?	(0)

International career^{‡}
2009 –2014	Kyrgyzstan	19	(0)
- * Club domestic league appearances and goals ‡ National team caps and goals as of 27 January 2019

Farukh Abitov (born 4 December 1988) is a retired Kyrgyzstani footballer, who is well known as a defence player of Dordoi Bishkek.

== International career ==
He was a member of the Kyrgyzstan national football team.
