= Bangladesh Sericulture Development Board =

- logo
- Formation: 1978
- Headquarters: Rajshahi, Bangladesh
- Region served: Bangladesh
- Official language: Bengali
- Director General: Tawfiq Al Mahmud
- Website: www.bsb.gov.bd

The Bangladesh Sericulture Development Board is a regulatory board in Bangladesh that is in charge of sericulture and is based in Rajshahi, Bangladesh.

== History ==
The Bangladesh Sericulture Development Board was formed in 1978 through the Presidential Ordinance 1977. It is responsible for the welfare sericulture workers and the promotion of the silk industry. It was formed with a factory office of the Sericulture factory inside the sericulture board premises. The journey began with the Director planning and Finance Late Md. Humayun Kabir. Who designed the entire architecture of forming the complete sericulture system covering all major district of Bangladesh. Specially northern part of Bangladesh. The board owns Mulberry plantations for silk agriculture in Bangladesh. The board is responsible for Bangladesh Sericulture Research and Training Institute and also manages state owned silk factories in Bangladesh.
