= Police Bureau of Investigation =

Police Bureau of Investigation পুলিশ ব্যুরো অব ইনভেস্টিগেশন
- Insignia of Police Bureau of Investigation
- Abbreviation: PBI

Agency overview
- Formed: September 18, 2012; 14 years ago

Jurisdictional structure
- National agency: Bangladesh
- Operations jurisdiction: Bangladesh
- Area: 148,460 km^{2} (57,320 sq mi)
- Population: 162 million
- Governing body: Ministry of Home Affairs
- Constituting instrument: The Police Act, 1861

Operational structure
- Headquarters: Road No. 4, Dhanmondee R/A, 1205 Dhaka.
- Minister responsible: Salahuddin Ahmed, Minister of Home Affairs
- Agency executive: Addl. IGP Md. Mustafa Kamal, Director General
- Parent agency: Bangladesh Police
- Type of Agency's: Investigation Directorate General

Website
- pbi.gov.bd
- Service uniform: Yankees Blue, Light French Beige Combat uniform: Navy Blue, Yankees Blue

The Police Bureau of Investigation (Bengali: পুলিশ ব্যুরো অব ইনভেস্টিগেশন, romanized: Puliśa byurō aba inabhēsṭigēśana; abbreviated as PBI) is a specialized investigative agency under the Bangladesh Police responsible for conducting complex and high-profile criminal investigations. Established in 2012, PBI handles cases that require advanced forensic, technical, and analytical expertise, including homicides, organized crime, cybercrime, and corruption-related offenses. The bureau works closely with other units of the Bangladesh Police and, when necessary, coordinates with national and international law enforcement agencies to ensure thorough and professional investigations.

== History ==
The Police Bureau of Investigation was formed on 18 September 2012 to investigate "sensational" and difficult cases. In November 2016 Bangladesh Police burned down shanties of Santals in Gaibandha and the PBI was tasked to identify the responsible police officers. They were charged with the investigation of the 2017 South Surma Upazila bombings. PBI has been tasked to collect evidence from terrorist attacks such as the 2017 RAB base suicide attack and the raid on the militant base in Sitakunda. The agency is responsible for the investigation of human trafficking.

=== Chiefs of PBI (2012-present) ===
Name	Rank	From	To
	Deputy Inspector General (DIG)	2012-12-22	2015-06-04
Barrister Mahbubur Rahman, ppm	Deputy Inspector General (DIG)	2015-06-04	2016-03-31
Banaj Kumar Majumder, BPM(Bar), PPM	Additional Inspector General (Addl. IGP)	2016-03-31	2024-07-31
Md Tawfique Mahbub Chowdhury	Additional Inspector General (Addl. IGP)	2024-08-13	March 2024
Md. Mustafa Kamal	Additional Inspector General (Addl. IGP)	May 2025	Current

== Notable cases ==
- Nusrat Murder Case
- Sagira Morshed Murder Case
- Nice Hotel Murder Case
- Murder, not suicide
- Salman Shah
