= Sadik Hasan Rumi =

Bangladeshi military personnel

- Military career
- Allegiance: Bangladesh
- Branch: Bangladesh Army; Bangladesh Ansar
- Service years: 1975–2008
- Rank: Major General
- Unit: East Bengal Regiment
- Commands: Director General of Bangladesh Ansar and Village Defence Party; Director General of Directorate General of Forces Intelligence; GOC of 11th Infantry Division; Commander of 101st Infantry Brigade
- Conflicts: 1977 Bangladesh Air Force mutiny
- Other work: President of Bangladesh Archery Association

19th Director General of Directorate General of Forces Intelligence
- In office 2006–2007
- President: Iajuddin Ahmed
- Prime Minister: Khaleda Zia
- Preceded by: Rezzakul Haider Chowdhury
- Succeeded by: ATM Amin

Sadik Hasan Rumi is a former major general of Bangladesh Army who served as director general of Directorate General of Forces Intelligence (DGFI) from May 2006 to May 2007.

== Career ==
Rumi was in charge of Directorate General of Forces Intelligence during the 21 August 2004 bombing in Dhaka that tried to assassinate then opposition leader Sheikh Hasina. His help was sought by Abdul Aziz Sarkar, the director general of Rapid Action Battalion, to capture Tajuddin, a terrorist and brother of Bangladesh Nationalist Party Minister Abdus Salam Pintu, who was the prime suspect in the 21 August bombing. He directed Directorate General of Forces Intelligence officer Lieutenant Colonel Saiful Islam Joarder to find Tajuddin. Saiful instead provided shelter to Tajuddin and Maulana Abdus Salam, the founder of Harkat-ul-Jihad-al-Islami in a DGFI safehouse in Gulshan. After confirming the involvement of Tajuddin and Harkat-ul-Jihad-al-Islami in the attacks, Directorate General of Forces Intelligence officers including Rumi and Saiful helped Tajuddin and Abdus Salam go to Pakistan on the orders of Home Minister Lutfozzaman Babar. Prime Minister Khaleda Zia tried to bury the case.

Rumi was appointed president of Bangladesh Archery Association on 17 November 2005.

Rumi left Bangladesh for London before the 2007 military takeover by General Moeen U Ahmed and formation of his caretaker government. He was against Major General Rezzakul Haidar Chowdhury, director general of National Security Intelligence.

Rumi was known as Kala Rumi among his colleagues to differentiate him from his fellow officer, Major General Syed Fatemi Ahmed Rumi, who was known as Shada Rumi. In 2008, Rumi was appointed director general of Bangladesh Ansar and Village Defence Party. He left military service soon after.

In 2011, Rumi, in a statement to a court in Chittagong implicated Rezzakul Haider Chowdhury, former director general of National Security Intelligence, in the 2004 arms and ammunition haul in Chittagong. He had reached the site with Minister of Home Affairs Lutfozzaman Babar and Director General of Rapid Action Battalion Anwarul Ikbal by helicopter. He reported the weapons were bought from China for the United Liberation Front of Asom. He had denied that he met the leader of United Liberation Front of Asom, Paresh Barua, denying the report of Assistant Superintendent of Police Moniruzzaman of the Criminal Investigation Department.

In 2012, Rumi told the Speedy Trial Tribunal-1 in the hearing of the 21 August 2004 bombing in Dhaka case that he was refused permission by Prime Minister Khaleda Zia to investigate the case.
