= Chowdhury Kamrul Ahsan =

Chowdhury Kamrul Ahsan is a retired additional inspector general of Bangladesh Police and head of the Human Resources and Training Department of Delta Life Insurance Company Limited.

== Early life ==
Ahsan completed his bachelor's and master's in Law. He completed an MBA afterwards.

== Career ==
Ahsan joined the Bangladesh Civil Service as a police officer cadre in 1974.

In January 2007, Ahsan was made an Officer on Special Duty and Additional Inspector General of Police Md. Sadat Hossain was sent into forced retirement by Iajuddin Ahmed led Caretaker government. This was done to allow their junior in service Khoda Bux Chowdhury to be appointed the inspector general of Bangladesh Police. His predecessor Anwarul Iqbal was also made an Officer on Special Duty.

In 2008, Ahsan retired as the additional inspector general of Bangladesh Police.

Ahsan started as head of the Human Resources and Training Department at Delta Life Insurance Company Limited. He is the Senior Executive Director of the Asian Duplex Town. In February 2021, he accused the Chairman of the Insurance Development and Regulatory Authority Dr. M Mosharraf Hossain of asking for a bribe.
