= Ali Akbar Khan (police) =

- আলী আকবর খান

Chief of Criminal Investigation Department
- Acting; 1 June 2026 – 28 July 2026
- President: Mohammed Shahabuddin
- Prime Minister: Tarique Rahaman
- Preceded by: Mosleh Uddin Ahmed

Personal details
- Born: 21 September 1967 (age 59) Faridganj, Chandpur, Bangladesh
- Police career
- Allegiance: Bangladesh
- Branch: Bangladesh Police
- Service years: 1995-present
- Status: Active
- Rank: Deputy Inspector General of Police (DIG)

Ali Akbar Khan (born 21 September 1967) is a Bangladeshi police officer who is serving as the acting chief of the Criminal Investigation Department of Bangladesh Police. He was appointed to the position in June 2026.

== Early life and education ==
Khan was born on 21 September 1967 in Faridganj, Chandpur. He completed his MBA at Daffodil International University.

== Career ==
He joined the Bangladesh Police in 1995 through the 15th Bangladesh Civil Service (BCS) Police cadre. During his career, he worked in several important units of the Bangladesh Police, including Range Police, Police Headquarters, and the Public Security Division of the Ministry of Home Affairs. He became known for his professionalism and administrative work.

In June 2026, he was appointed acting chief of the Criminal Investigation Department (CID) after the previous CID chief, Mosleh Uddin Ahmed, became commissioner of Dhaka Metropolitan Police (DMP).

Khan also took part in many local and international training programs, seminars and workshops. He attended workshops in Italy and the Maldives on human trafficking, migration and smuggling-related investigations.
