= Abdullah Hel Baki (police officer) =

Abdullah Hel Baki is a retired Bangladesh Police officer and former deputy commissioner of the Chittagong Metropolitan Police. He later served in the Criminal Investigation Department.

== Career ==
Baki joined the 15th batch of the Bangladesh Civil Service police cadre.

Baki served in the Bangladesh Police and held the position of deputy commissioner of the Chittagong Metropolitan Police in the early 2000s, serving under S. M. Sabbir Ali. He was involved in the response to the 2004 arms and ammunition haul in Chittagong, one of the largest arms seizures in Bangladesh's history. According to court testimony in subsequent proceedings, Baki was present at the Chittagong Urea Fertiliser Limited jetty during the incident and communicated with senior officials regarding the seizure of arms and the detention of suspects.

In March 2009, Baki was serving as a special superintendent of police in the Criminal Investigation Department and was overseeing the investigation into the 2009 Bangladesh Rifles Mutiny case before being replaced by Misarul Arif at the CID chief Javed Patwari's directive.

In May 2012, Baki was mentioned in court testimony by former Chittagong Metropolitan Police Commissioner S. M. Sabbir Ali in connection with the 2004 arms and ammunition haul in Chittagong. Ali stated that he and Baki attended a meeting with then State Minister for Home Affairs, Lutfozzaman Babar, Inspector General of Police Shahudul Haque, Directorate General of Forces Intelligence chief Sadique Hasan Rumi, and Rapid Action Battalion chief Anwarul Iqbal, where they reported the alleged involvement of National Security Intelligence officials. According to the testimony, Babar instructed them not to disclose the matter publicly and informed them that an investigation committee had been formed. The case also involved accused individuals, including United Liberation Front of Asom leader Paresh Barua and former additional secretary Nurul Amin. Testimony also indicated that, following instructions from the State Minister for Home Affairs, Lutfozzaman Babar, and Commissioner S. M. Sabbir Ali, five detained individuals linked to the United Liberation Front of Asom were released.

In August 2013, while serving as deputy commissioner of the Chittagong Metropolitan Police, Baki led a raid on dormitories of Chittagong Government College, where police detained 60 members of the Bangladesh Islami Chhatra Shibir and recovered materials described as "jihadi" books. He served as the head of the Trafficking Department of the Criminal Investigation Department. He was involved in the investigation of the Bangladesh Bank robbery case and murder of Ananta Bijoy Das.

In October 2022, Baki, then serving as a police superintendent in the Criminal Investigation Department, was forced into retirement by the government, citing public interest, along with fellow officers Muhammad Shahidullah Chowdhury, Sheikh Omar Faruque, and Delwar Hossain Mia. Soon after, Md Mahbub Hakim of the Tourist Police and Md Alamgir Alam of the Criminal Investigation Department were also sent into forced retirement.
