= Akhtaruzzaman Ranjan =

Bangladeshi politician

- আখতারুজ্জামান রঞ্জন

Member of the Bangladesh Parliament for Kishoreganj-2
- In office 14 July 1996 – 13 July 2001
- Preceded by: Habibur Rahman Dayal
- Succeeded by: M. A. Mannan
- In office 5 March 1991 – 24 November 1995
- Preceded by: Mohammad Nuruzzaman
- Succeeded by: Habibur Rahman Dayal

Personal details
- Born: 2 September 1947 (age 79) Kishoreganj, East Bengal, Dominion of Pakistan
- Party: Bangladesh Jamaat-e-Islami (since 2025)
- Other political affiliations: Bangladesh Nationalist Party (until 2022)
- Spouse: Salma Zaman
- Relatives: Anisuzzaman Khokon (brother)
- Awards: Shongbidhan Padak; Independence Day Award

Military service
- Allegiance: Pakistan (before 1971); Bangladesh
- Branch/service: Pakistan Army (before 1971); Bangladesh Army
- Years of service: 1969 – 1989
- Rank: Major
- Unit: Regiment of Artillery
- Commands: Battery Officer of Z Force; BM of 9th Artillery Brigade; 2IC of 17th Medium Artillery Regiment
- Battles/wars: Bangladesh Liberation War

Akhtaruzzaman Ranjan is a retired Bangladesh Army Major and a politician. He is a freedom fighter of the Liberation War of Bangladesh in 1971. He is a former Jatiya Sangsad member representing the Kishoreganj-2 constituency.

== Career ==
Akhtaruzzaman Ranjan served in the Bangladesh Army for 16 years and joined in business after his retirement. He is the founding chairman and managing director of Gachihata Aquaculture Farms Ltd since 1996.

Ranjan was elected to parliament from Kishoreganj-2 as a Bangladesh Nationalist Party (BNP) candidate in 1991 and 1996. In January 1998, his party activity for the BNP was suspsended after planning to return to the parliament of Bangladesh against the wishes of his party; BNP was then the opposition party of Jatiya Sangsad and had been boycotting the parliamentary sessions. In February 2022, Ranjan was dismissed from the BNP for doing activities against the party. In December 2025, he joined Bangladesh Jamaat-e-Islami party.

On 2 October 2026, Ranjan was detained from his residence in Banani DOHS by the Detective Branch after a case was filed against him for obstructing official duties at the Hazrat Shahjalal International Airport by an airport security officer Md Shahriar Alam Sajib. On 1 November, he was granted bail by the High Court.

== Personal life ==
Ranjan is married to Salma Zaman. Together they have two sons.

Ranjan's younger brother is Anisuzzaman Khokon, a former member of the Jatiya Sangsad and Bangladesh Nationalist Party politician.
