= Jalal Uddin Jalal =

Bangladeshi politician

- জালাল উদ্দীন জালাল

Member of the Bangladesh Parliament for Kishoreganj-2
- Incumbent
- Assumed office 17 February 2026
- Preceded by: Md. Suhrab Uddin

Personal details
- Born: Pakundia Upazila, Kishoreganj District
- Party: Bangladesh Nationalist Party

Jalal Uddin Jalal is a Bangladeshi politician. As of March 2026, he is serving as a member of parliament from Kishoreganj-2.

== Early life ==
Jalal was born at Pakundia Upazila under Kishoreganj District.
