= ABM Bazlur Rahman =

Commissioner of Dhaka Metropolitan Police

ABM Bazlur Rahman is a retired police officer and former commissioner of the Dhaka Metropolitan Police.

== Early life ==
Rahman did his master's in economics at the University of Dhaka. He is a member of the Bangladesh Economics Association.

== Career ==
Rahman has served in the United Nations Mission in Bosnia and Herzegovina.

From 7 November 1999 to 30 November 2000, Rahman was the director of Training of the Police Staff College, Bangladesh. From 2001 to 2002, Rahman served in the United Nations Transitional Administration in East Timor. In September 2003, he was promoted to deputy inspectors general.

In November 2006, Rahman was appointed commissioner of the Dhaka Metropolitan Police. He replaced Naeem Ahmed as commissioner. Naeem had served less than 48 hours as commissioner before being replaced by Rahman. He met President Iajuddin Ahmed in November 2006 along with director generals of Rapid Action Battalion and Bangladesh Rifles, and Inspector General of Police. In January 2007, he led raid of the Dhaka Metropolitan Police in detaining more than a thousand supporters of the Awami League ahead of a program of the party. Three thousand people were detained in mass arrests after Rahman provided each police station under the Dhaka Metropolitan Police with a target number of detainees.

Rahman was made officer on special duty in July 2007 along with Director General of Rapid Action Battalion SM Mizanur Rahman.

Rahman is a director of Administration of the Independent University, Bangladesh.
