= Mohammad Shahidullah Chowdhury =

- Occupation: Police officer
- Known for: Superintendent of Police, Bangladesh Police

Mohammad Shahidullah Chowdhury is a former Bangladeshi police officer and coordinator of Investigation Agency-ICTBD.

== Early life ==
Chowdhury was born in Noakhali District.

== Career ==
Chowdhury joined the 12th batch of the Bangladesh Civil Service police cadre in 1991. He trained at the Bangladesh Military Academy. He served as a superintendent of Police (TR) at police headquarters.

In October 2022, the Awami League Government sent Chowdhury on compulsory retirement along with Mirza Abdullahel Baki and Delwar Hossain Mia. Md Mahbub Hakim of the Tourist Police and Md Alamgir Alam of the Criminal Investigation Department were also sent into forced retirement soon after. He was set to retire in January 2024.

After the fall of the Sheikh Hasina led Awami League government, Chowdhury was appointed as a member of the Investigation Agency of the International Crimes Tribunal following its reconstitution by the Ministry of Home Affairs. As a retired superintendent of police, he was included on a contractual basis under DIG Md Mazharul Haque.
