= Md. Sadat Hossain =

Md. Sadat Hossain is a retired Additional Inspector General of Police of the Bangladesh Police and former principal of the Bangladesh Police Academy.

== Career ==
From 9 October 2002 to 27 May 2003, Hossain served as the principal of the Bangladesh Police Academy.

Hossain was an Additional Inspector General of Police in 2006. Hossain was sent into forced retirement shortly before the end of the Bangladesh Nationalist Party-led four-party alliance government's tenure. Reports at the time indicated that he was senior to several officers who were subsequently promoted to key positions, including Khoda Bux Chowdhury and Chowdhury Kamrul Ahsan. Chowdhury was then appointed the Inspector General of Bangladesh Police. Observers viewed his retirement as part of a broader trend of politicisation within the police administration. This reshuffling favoured officers perceived as aligned with the previous ruling party, while sidelining others, including Hossain, who were not seen as politically aligned.
