= Shahed Nuruddin =

Bangladeshi judge

Justice of the High Court Division of Bangladesh

Personal details
- Profession: Judge

Shahed Nuruddin is a former Justice of the High Court Division of the Bangladesh Supreme Court. He was the trial judge in the 2004 Dhaka grenade attack case.

== Early life ==
Nuruddin on 1 February 1960. He did his Bachelor of Law and Master of Laws from the University of Dhaka.

== Career ==
Nuruddin joined the judicial branch of the Bangladesh Civil Service on 20 April 1983 as a Munsif.

On 27 February 2000, Nuruddin was promoted to District and Sessions Judge.

On 10 October 2018, Nuruddin, as Judge of the Speedy Trial Tribunal-1, issued the 2004 Dhaka grenade attack case. The case had accused 49 persons in total. It ruled the grenade attack "was a well-orchestrated plan, executed through abuse of state power". Nuruddin said, "The specialised deadly Arges grenades that are used in wars were blasted at the Awami League's central office on 23 Bangabandhu Avenue in broad daylight with the help of the then state machinery". On charges of killing through common intention, planning and criminal conspiracy, 38 persons were found guilty. 19 of them were sentenced to death, including former Minister of Home Affairs Lutfozzaman Babar, Member of Parliament Abdus Salam Pintu, General Rezzakul Haider Chowdhury, and General Abdur Rahim. The verdict also sentenced 19 to life imprisonment including Tarique Rahman, son of former Prime Minister Khaleda Zia and acting chairperson of the Bangladesh Nationalist Party, former secretary to Prime Minister Khaleda Zia, Harris Chowdhury, and member of parliament, Kazi Shah Mofazzal Hossain Kaikobad.

Nuruddin was appointed an additional judge of the High Court Division on 21 October 2019.

In December 2020, Nuruddin and Justice FRM Nazmul Ahasan ordered the government to protect monuments of President Sheikh Mujibur Rahman.

In June 2022, Nuruddin and Justice Jahangir Hossain Selim suspended a verdict of the Nilphamari District Women and Children Repression Prevention Tribunal that acquitted a member of Border Guards Bangladesh after the 15 year old victim made a surprise appearance before the bench without lawyers and sought justice from the bench. Nuruddin and Justice Jahangir Hossain granted permanent bail to former Prime Minister Khaleda Zia in a 2014 case on hurting religious sentiments and 2017 case for making derogatory comments on former President Sheikh Mujibur Rahman. On 3 October 2022, Nuruddin and Justice M Akram Hossain Chowdhury granted bail to a leader of Rajbari District unit of Bangladesh Jatiotabadi Mohila Dal in a defamation case for making derogatory comments about Prime Minister Sheikh Hasina.

In May 2023, Nuruddin and Justice S. M. Kuddus Zaman denied bail to former Deputy Inspector General of Bangladesh Police, Md Mizanur Rahman, in a corruption case.

Following the fall of the Sheikh Hasina led Awami League government, all the convicts in the 2004 grenade attack case were declared innocent and the Supreme Judicial Council initiaited an investigation against Nuruddin. He resigned in January 2025.
