= Nur Mohammad (police officer) =

Bangladeshi police officer and politician

- নূর মোহাম্মদ

Member of the Bangladesh Parliament for Kishoreganj-2
- In office 30 January 2019 – 2 November 2023
- Preceded by: Md. Suhrab Uddin
- Succeeded by: Md. Suhrab Uddin

Inspector General of Bangladesh Police
- In office 29 January 2007 – 31 August 2010
- President: Iajuddin Ahmed; Zillur Rahman
- Prime Minister: Fakhruddin Ahmed; Sheikh Hasina
- Preceded by: Khoda Baksh Chowdhury
- Succeeded by: Hassan Mahmood Khandker

6th Chief Executive of Criminal Investigation Department
- In office 14 January 2007 – 28 January 2007
- Appointed by: Minister of Home Affairs
- Preceded by: SM Mizanur Rahman
- Succeeded by: Phani Bhoushon Choudhury

Personal details
- Party: Bangladesh Awami League
- Spouse: Ismat Nur
- Education: University of Dhaka Police Training Bangladesh Police Academy
- Awards: Bangladesh Police Medal (BPM); President Police Medal (PPM)
- Police career
- Allegiance: Bangladesh
- Branch: Bangladesh Police
- Service years: 1982 - 2010
- Status: Retired
- Rank: IGP

Nur Mohammad is a member of parliament in Bangladesh from Kishorganj 2. He was earlier a Bangladeshi ambassador and also the inspector general of the Bangladesh Police during 2007–2010. In October 2012, he was appointed the youth and sports secretary by the government of Bangladesh.

== Education and career ==
Nur obtained his bachelor's and master's degrees in history from the University of Dhaka. He belonged to the 1982 batch of the BCS (police) cadre. He served as police superintendent of Tangail and Narayanganj, and deputy commissioner (DC) of Chittagong Metropolitan Police (CMP). He also served as deputy inspector general (DIG) of Rajshahi and Khulna ranges. He served in the UN mission in Kosovo (UNMIK). He served as the additional inspector general (IGP-administration) of police headquarters (PHQ). In August 2011, he was appointed the ambassador of Bangladesh to Morocco.

In 2012, a parliamentary body submitted a special report on the 2007 University of Dhaka campus violence. It held several officials, including Nur, responsible for "inhuman torture" of teachers and students during the campus unrest and recommended bringing them to book under existing laws.

Since 2015, Nur has been serving as the managing partner of the Centre for Policy Research, Bangladesh.

In 2018, Nur received the nomination from the Bangladesh Awami League to run in the national elections for his hometown, Kishoreganj. On 30 December 2018, he was declared the new member of parliament from Kishoreganj-2, with significantly higher votes; against that of his opponent Akhtaruzzaman Ranjan from BNP.

== Personal life ==
Nur is married to Ismat Nur. They have 3 children: Nusrat Nur (40) working for IOM, Barrister Omar Mohammad Nur (35) involved in several businesses, and Fariha Nur (30) studying at North South University. His oldest daughter Nusrat Nur Badhon's husband army Captain Mazharul Haider died in the 2009 BDR Mutiny incident.
