= Md. Kohinoor Mia =

Bangladeshi police officer

Md Kohinoor Mia
- মোঃ কোহিনূর মিয়া
- Occupation: Police officer

Md Kohinoor Mia is a Bangladesh Police officer who was reinstated and promoted to the rank of Additional Deputy Inspector General after his earlier dismissal was annulled.

== Early life ==
Mia was born in Sadarpur Upazila, Faridpur District.

== Career ==
Mia joined the 12th batch of the Bangladesh Civil Service as a police service cadet.

Mia served in several positions in the Bangladesh Police, including deputy commissioner of the West Zone of the Dhaka Metropolitan Police and superintendent of police in Mymensingh.

During the 2001–2006 Bangladesh Nationalist Party–Bangladesh Jamaat-e-Islami-led four-party alliance government, he was regarded as a close police official of the administration of the time. He led the 2002 Police raid on Shamsunnahar Hall, a female dormitory at the University of Dhaka.

In 2006, a pregnant woman, Shahin Sultana Shanta, filed a complaint of assault against Mia at the Dhaka Chief Metropolitan Magistrate's Court. The woman was assaulted by Mia and a constable during a protest by the Awami League. She had hidden in a clinic from where she was dragged out along with her son and assaulted in a police van. The woman suffered a miscarriage because of the beating. Shahin Sultana Santa is daughter of High Court Justice Shamsul Huda Manik. On 11 October 2006, he was accused of torturing Noor-e-Alam, general secretary of Awami Jubo Ainjibi League, in custody. He had also allegedly assaulted Awami League politicians Motia Chowdhury, Mohammad Nasim, Saber Hossain Chowdhury, and Tofail Ahmed.

Reports later stated that Mia went into hiding after the Awami League came to power in 2009. He was the Deputy Commissioner of the Dhaka Metropolitan Police. He was removed from his position on 4 October 2009. At the same time, Additional Deputy Inspector General of police Md Mazharul Haque was also removed from the police force on similar grounds. Mia filed a petition with the High Court Division seeking anticipatory bail.

=== Dismissal and legal cases ===
On 22 February 2011, the Ministry of Home Affairs dismissed Mia by a gazette from service following two departmental proceedings arising from criminal allegations stemming from separate incidents in 2004 and 2006. One case stemmed from allegations that a woman and her child were assaulted during political unrest in Dhaka in March 2006. After prolonged court proceedings, the accused were acquitted when the witnesses failed to support the allegations. Another case related to violence during the 2004 municipal elections in Nandail, Mymensingh, in which two people were shot dead by the police. The case was filed by Rafiq Uddin Bhuiyan, an Awami League politician, in 2007. He was later acquitted on 24 November 2025, along with the Mayor of Nandail Municipality, Abdus Chattar Bhuiyan Ujjal, after the Mymensingh Additional Sessions Judge's Second Court, presided over by Judge Sabrina Ali, found the charges unproven. He was serving as the Superintendent of Police of Mymensingh District.

=== Reinstatement and promotion ===
In March 2026, the newly elected Bangladesh Nationalist Party government revoked the dismissal order after courts had cleared him in the related criminal cases. His suspension period was counted as service time, making him eligible for arrears, allowances, and other benefits. Senior Secretary Monjur Morshed Chowdhury, secretary of the Public Security Division of the Ministry of Home Affairs, revoked the dismissal through a gazette notification, effectively restoring him to service. In April 2026, he was promoted to the rank of Additional Deputy Inspector General.

== Personal life ==
Mia's daughter, Elona Taqwa, died from a fall from the rooftop of her apartment building in Banani on 7 June 2019. According to Rafiqul Islam, Assistant Commissioner of the Gulshan Circle of the Dhaka Metropolitan Police, the police suspected it to be a suicide. She was 18 years old at the time.
