= Md Mazharul Haque =

Bangladeshi police officer

- মোঃ মজহারুল হক

Chief Executive Officer of the National Security Cell^{[3]}

Personal details
- Occupation: Police officer

Md Mazharul Haque is a retired additional deputy inspector general of Bangladesh Police and a former vice-principal of the Bangladesh Police Academy. He had served as the coordinator of the Investigation Agency-ICTBD, the investigative arm of the International Crimes Tribunal of Bangladesh, since 2024. Currently, he is the chief executive officer of the National Security Cell.

== Career ==
Haque served in the Bangladesh Police and held several senior administrative positions. In 2009, he was serving as the vice-principal of the Bangladesh Police Academy with the rank of additional deputy inspector general of police.

In 2006, Haque was named in a torture case filed by Shahin Sultana Santa, who alleged that police officers assaulted her during a political demonstration in Dhaka. She was pregnant at the time and had a miscarriage. Shahin Sultana Santa is the daughter of High Court Justice Shamsul Huda Manik. The complaint identified Haque, then a deputy commissioner of the Dhaka Metropolitan Police, alongside Kohinoor Miah and other officers. After prolonged legal proceedings, the case was formally recorded as a First Information Report in 2009. All officers were cleared by Md Hasibul Haque, Dhaka Chief Metropolitan Magistrate, in September 2024.

In January 2007, Haque was the Deputy Inspector General of Dhaka Range. He was appointed commandant of the Police Training Centre, Tangail.

In October 2009, the Ministry of Home Affairs suspended Haque on charges of professional misconduct under the Government Service Rule (Discipline and Appeal), 1985. A departmental case was also initiated against him. According to contemporary media reports, the allegations related to misconduct and the mistreatment of women during the 2001–2006 Bangladesh Nationalist Party–Bangladesh Jamaat-e-Islami coalition government period.

After the fall of the Sheikh Hasina-led Awami League government in August 2024, Haque was appointed coordinator of the investigative agency of the International Crimes Tribunal following the reconstitution of the agency by the Mohammad Yunus government for a two-year term.

In February 2025, Haque was reassigned from his position as coordinator of the investigative agency of the International Crimes Tribunal to the Public Security Division of the Ministry of Home Affairs, ending his tenure after approximately five months. He was succeeded by former police officer Ansar Uddin Khan Pathan.

In some time in 2026, He was reassigned as the chief executive officer of the National Security Cell which is still ongoing.
