= A. T. M. Amin =

Bangladeshi military personnel

ATM Amin
- Military career
- Allegiance: Bangladesh
- Branch: Bangladesh Army; Bangladesh Ansar
- Service years: 1979–2009
- Rank: Major General
- Unit: East Bengal Regiment
- Commands: Director General of Ansar and VDP; Director General of DGFI; Director of CTIB; Commander of 69th Infantry Brigade
- Conflicts: Chittagong Hill Tracts Conflict; 2006-2008 Bangladeshi political crisis

ATM Amin is a retired general of the Bangladesh Army. He is a former director general of Forces Intelligence, and a former director general of the Ansar and VDP. He voluntarily retired in 2009.

== Career ==
Amin, a graduate of the Turkish War College, has served in various missions across Eastern Europe, China, and the United States. He holds a doctorate in counter terrorism and security studies. As brigadier general, he was director of the Counter Terrorism and Intelligence Bureau of the DGFI. Later he was promoted to major general and appointed DG of Ansar and VDP. After the 2004 Dhaka grenade attack, he was falsely accused and framed as helping one of the suspects escape from Bangladesh with support from DGFI officer Lieutenant Colonel Saiful Islam Joarder and Saiful Islam Duke, a nephew of Prime Minister Khaleda Zia.

Amin left Bangladesh soon after the Awami League government came to power. As of 2024, Amin, along with others, has been acquitted of any criminal charges, including any involvement in the 2004 Dhaka grenade attack.
