= Investigation Agency-ICTBD =

- Formation: 2013
- Headquarters: Dhaka, Bangladesh
- Region served: Bangladesh
- Official language: Bengali
- Website: Investigation Agency-ICTBD

Investigation Agency, International Crimes Tribunal of Bangladesh is a specialized law enforcement agency of the International Crimes Tribunal of Bangladesh under the Ministry of Home Affairs responsible for investigating cases and suspects for the International Crimes Tribunal. The agency is led by Md. Abdur Rahim and M Sanaul Haque, both former Bangladesh Police officers with the rank of Inspector General of Police.

== History ==
Investigation Agency-ICTBD was established in 2013 according to the International Crimes (Tribunals) Act of 1973. It purpose is to investigate war crimes committed during the Bangladesh Liberation war and part of the Bangladesh Genocide. In 2011, retired police officer and veteran of the Bangladesh Liberation War, Mohammad Abdul Hannan Khan, was appointed chief coordinator of the agency with the rank of an inspector general of police. He was succeeded by his deputy, M Sanaul Haque.

After the fall of the Sheikh Hasina led Awami League government, the agency began investigation against the former regime including Prime Minister Sheikh Hasina over the death of protestors. The International Crimes Tribunal was reconstituted under the interim government led by Muhammad Yunus with new judges to try those charged with being involved in the death of protestors against Sheikh Hasina in July and other crimes during her rule. It appointed Muhammad Tajul Islam, former defence lawyer of the leaders of Bangladesh Jamaat-e-Islami accused in the tribunal, as chief prosecutor. New investigators were appointed to the agency, including additional DIG Md Mazharul Haque as coordinator and Superintendent of Police Mohammad Shahidullah Chowdhury as co-ordinator. In April 2025, retired police officer Ansar Uddin Khan Pathan was appointed coordinator of the Investigation Agency.
