= National Committee on Security Affairs =

Highest policy-making authority on national security of Bangladesh

- নিরাপত্তা সংক্রান্ত জাতীয় কমিটি
- · National Emblem · Government Seal

Agency overview
- Formed: March 2019; 7 years ago
- Jurisdiction: Bangladesh
- Headquarters: Bangladesh Secretariat, Dhaka
- Prime Minister responsible: Tarique Rahman, Chairman
- Parent department: Prime Minister's Office
- Parent agency: Government of Bangladesh
- Child agency: National Security Affairs Cell

National Committee on Security Affairs (NCSA) is the highest policy-making authority on national security of the Government of Bangladesh. Headed by the Prime Minister, the committee was formed in March 2019 after 'the National Defence Policy-2018' was approved by the Cabinet of Bangladesh. The committee consists of 27 members.

The NCSA comprises the Prime Minister, ministers of Home Affairs, Information, Law, Justice and Parliamentary Affairs, Finance, Foreign Affairs, Planning, Industries, Commerce, Defence Adviser to the Prime Minister, Cabinet Secretary, Principal Secretary to the Prime Minister, Chief of Army Staff, Chief of Air Staff, Chief of Naval Staff, Inspector General of Police, Foreign Secretary, Defence Secretary, Secretaries of Public Security Division and Security Services Division at the Home Ministry, Finance Secretary, Law Secretary, Principal Staff Officer of Armed Forces Division, Director General of National Security Intelligence, Director General of the Directorate General of Forces Intelligence and Director General of Border Guards Bangladesh and Director General of Bangladesh Coast Guard.

== Functions ==
- Evaluation and review of national and international security situations and other issues related to state security and defense affairs.
- Prepare recommendations for the cabinet.
- Direct the authorities concerned to take steps

== See also ==
- National Committee for Intelligence Coordination
