= M Akram Hossain Chowdhury =

Bangladeshi Judge

Justice of the High Court Division of Bangladesh

Personal details
- Profession: Judge

M Akram Hossain Chowdhury is a judge on the High Court Division of the Bangladesh Supreme Court.

== Early life ==
Chowdhury was born on 25 April 1959. He has a bachelor's of art and another in law from the University of Dhaka.

== Career ==
Chowdhury started his legal practice on 26 October 1987 in the district courts and in the High Court on 30 October 1989.

Chowdhury was appointed the deputy attorney general of Bangladesh in February 2009.

Chowdhury was appointed to an additional judge of the High Court Division on 12 December 2010 and was made a permanent judge on 10 December 2012 by President Zillur Rahman.

In February 2014, Chowdhury and Justice M Enayetur Rahim sentenced three people to life imprisonment over the murder of Commodore Ghulam Rabbani, former managing director of Korean Export Processing Zone, in 2004. Chowdhury and Justice Sayed AB Mahmudul Huq granted one year bail to Helena Pasha of Adflame Pharmaceuticals in an adulteration case in which she was sentenced to ten years imprisonment. In the 1990s a number of children died after consuming contaminated children's paracetamol syrup.

In June 2016, Chowdhury and Justice Md Habibul Gani granted bail to an activist of Bangladesh Chhatra League who had been convicted on election rigging during union elections in Hathazari Upazila. Chowdhury and Justice Md Habibul Gani granted bail to Bangladesh Nationalist Party politician Rizvi Ahmed in five different criminal cases.

Justice Md Emdadul Huq and Chowdhury denied bail to folk singer Shariat Boyati in a case over "hurting the religious sentiments" of Muslims.

On 3 October 2022, Chowdhury and Justice Shahed Nuruddin granted bail to a leader of Rajbari District unit of Bangladesh Jatiotabadi Mohila Dal in a defamation case for making derogatory comments about Prime Minister Sheikh Hasina. He was a member of the Chief Justice Medal selection committee.

In 2023, Chowdhury and Justice Mohammad Ali granted bail to the owner of Rana Plaza, Sohel Rana, in the case over the collapse plaza. The bail was canceled in April by Justice Md Abu Jafor Siddique.
