= 2002 Police raid Shamsunnahar Hall =

Bangladeshi university incident

2002 Police raid Shamsunnahar Hall refers to a raid by the Bangladesh police on Shamsunnahar Hall of the University of Dhaka on 23 July 2002. The raid injured 200 students and is remembered as the Shamsunnahar Hall Tragedy day in Bangladesh.

== Background ==
In 2002 Bangladesh Nationalist Party (BNP) was in power. The students of Shamsunnahar Hall of the University of Dhaka were protesting against the unauthorised stay of leaders of Jatiyatabadi Chhatra Dal, the student wing of the BNP, at the dormitory.

== Event ==
The police raided the dorm in the middle of the night on 23 July 2002. Residents of the dorms were dragged out by police officers and assaulted. The police were joined in the raid by leaders of Jatiyatabadi Chhatra Dal.

== Reaction ==
The attack was protested throughout the university the following day. Professor Anwarullah Chowdhury, the Vice Chancellor of the University of Dhaka, was forced to resign following the raid. The university's proctor also resigned. Prime Minister Khaleda Zia ordered the formation of a commission to investigate the incident. The one man commission was made up of Justice M Tafazzul Islam. The probe report blamed the incident on Additional Deputy Commissioner Abdur Rahim of Bangladesh Police and the officials of the University of Dhaka. The raid was led by Police Officer Md. Kohinoor Mia.

== Legacy ==
In 2003, the first anniversary of the raid, the Bangladesh Chhatra League carried out a candlelight procession at the Central Shahid Minar. Students Against Repression submitted a memorandum to Vice Chancellor Syed Muhammed Abul Faiz calling for action against those responsible. The day of the raid is remembered as the Shamsunnahar Hall Tragedy day.
