= S. M. Sabbir Ali =

Bangladeshi police officer

S M Sabbir Ali is a retired Bangladeshi police officer and a former commissioner of the Chittagong Metropolitan Police. He was a witness in the 2004 arms and ammunition haul in Chittagong case.

== Career ==
Ali served in the Bangladesh Police and held the position of commissioner of Chittagong Metropolitan Police. The Murder of Jamaluddin Ahmed Chowdhury and the 2004 arms and ammunition haul in Chittagong took place during his tenure. Following his tenure, he retired from active service.

In May 2012, Ali testified as a witness in the 2004 arms and ammunition haul in Chittagong case before a Chittagong court. In his deposition, he stated that the then State Minister for Home Affairs, Lutfozzaman Babar, had instructed him not to disclose the alleged involvement of officials from the National Security Intelligence in the incident. He had also testified against Ministry for Home Affairs secretary Muhammad Omar Farooq. He further testified in court that former state minister for home Lutfuzzaman Babar had instructed him not to arrest National Security Intelligence official Major Liakat Hossain during the arms seizure, despite obstruction at the scene. He stated that then deputy commissioner Abdullah Hel Baki had informed him about the unloading of illegal arms and the resistance from NSI personnel, and his deposition also implicated several NSI officials in the case. Barbar had also ordered the release of five suspected United Liberation Front of Asom members. The separatists allegedly paid 7 billion BDT to the Bangladesh Nationalist Party government to ensure the weapons reached Assam.
