= Mohammad Abdul Hannan Khan =

- মোহাম্মদ আব্দুল হান্নান খান

Personal details
- Died: June 28, 2020 (aged 77–78) Dhaka, Bangladesh
- Resting place: Khalishaur, Purbadhala, Netrokona
- Children: 1 son, 1 daughter
- Education: Dhaka University (MA in English, LLB)
- Occupation: Police officer, investigator, veteran of the Bangladesh Liberation War
- Known for: Chief Coordinator, International Crimes Tribunal Investigation Agency

Mohammad Abdul Hannan Khan (died 28 June 2020) was a Bangladeshi police officer, veteran of the Bangladesh Liberation War, and chief coordinator of the International Crimes Tribunal’s Investigation Agency. He was known for his role in investigating the assassination of Sheikh Mujibur Rahman, the jail killings of 1975, and the intellectual killings during the liberation war.

== Early life ==
Khan was born in 1942. He was also a political activist in his youth. He was elected to the Dhaka University Central Students' Union in 1964 and was arrested during protests against the Pakistani regime. Khan completed his master's in English (1965) and a Bachelor of Laws (1973) from the University of Dhaka. He later edited a book titled Netrokona Zilar Itihas.

== Career ==
Khan taught in several colleges, including Brahmanbaria Government College and Government Ashek Mahmud College. He joined the Bangladesh Liberation War in 1971, fighting under Sector 11.

Following independence, Khan joined the Bangladesh Police in 1973 as an Assistant Superintendent as part of the first batch of the Bangladesh Civil Service. He was the chief coordinator of the investigation into the Assassination of Sheikh Mujibur Rahman and the Jail Killing cases. He retired as an Additional Deputy Inspector General in 2000.

In 2011, Khan was appointed Chief Coordinator of the ICT Investigation Agency at the rank of Inspector General of Police, to investigate war criminals from the Bangladesh Liberation War. He investigated war crimes allegations against Ghulam Azam, head of Bangladesh Jama'at-e-Islami, and its leaders AKM Yusuf, Chowdhury Mueen-Uddin and Ashrafuzzaman Khan. He investigated four former leaders of the Islami Chhatra Sangha in Noakhali District for war crimes during the Bangladesh Liberation War. He investigated war crimes allegations against four leaders of Bangladesh Jamaat-e-Islami in Satkhira District, including a former member of parliament, Mohammad Abdul Khalek Mondal. He investigated Osman Faruk, advisor to former Prime Minister Khaleda Zia, and MA Hannan, member of parliament of the Jatiya Party. He investigated five people in Jessore district on war crimes charges.

Khan expressed support for the Awami League government along with 87 retired police officers ahead of the 2018 general election.

== Death ==
Khan died from COVID-19 at the Combined Military Hospital, Dhaka , on 28 June 2020 at the age of 78. He was buried near his ancestral home in Khalishaur, Netrokona District. Prime Minister Sheikh Hasina, President Mohammad Abdul Hamid, and several cabinet members expressed condolences on his death.
