= Ansar Uddin Khan Pathan =

- Occupation: Police officer
- Known for: Coordinator of the Investigation Agency-ICTBD

Ansar Uddin Khan Pathan is a Bangladeshi police officer and Coordinator of the Investigation Agency of the International Crimes Tribunal.

== Early life ==
Pathan was born in Kajla, Bairati Union, Purbadhala, Netrokona District. His father was Surat Ali. He established Shaheda Memorial Library in Kajla.

== Career ==
Pathan was the deputy commissioner of Dhaka Metropolitan Police (Traffic, South) in 2004.

In February 2007, Pathan was serving as the Superintendent of Police of Noakhali when he was transferred to the Sardah Police Academy. He was involved with police reforms during the Fakruddin Ahmed-led caretaker government. In March 2009, he was serving as Superintendent of Police in Dhaka. Subsequently, he was appointed Commandant of the Police Staff Training School, Rangamati.

In March 2015, Pathan was serving as Commandant of the Sylhet Range Reserve Force. During a police administration reshuffle, he was transferred to the Bangladesh Police Academy, replacing Rezaul Karim Mallick as Superintendent of Police. On 21 November 2022, he retired from the Bangladesh Police.

Pathan attended a press conference of the Bangladesh Nationalist Party in which the party demanded the abolition of the Rapid Action Battalion.

On 30 April 2025, the Ministry of Public Administration appointed him as Coordinator of the Investigation Agency of the International Crimes Tribunal. He succeeded retired Additional DIG Md Mazharul Haque. The agency was reconstituted in 2024 after the fall of the Sheikh Hasina-led Awami League. In September, he was promoted to additional inspector general of police.
