= FRM Nazmul Ahasan =

Bangladeshi lawyer (1955–2022)

- নাজমুল আহসান

Justice of the High Court Division of Bangladesh

Personal details
- Born: February 15, 1955 (age 71)
- Died: 4 February 2022
- Party: Communist Party of Bangladesh (until 18 April 2010)
- Profession: Judge

FRM Nazmul Ahasan (15 February 1955 – 4 February 2022) was a Bangladeshi lawyer and Judge of the Appellate Division of Bangladesh Supreme Court.

== Early life ==
Nazmul Ahasan was born on 15 February 1955, in Pakistan. After finishing his masters, he completed his law degree.

== Career ==
On 18 March 1986, Nazmul Ahasan started working as a lawyer in the District Courts.

Nazmul Ahasan became a lawyer in the High Court Division on 22 January 1994 and on 13 December 2009 the Appellate Division. He was a member of the Central Committee of Communist Party of Bangladesh.

On 18 April 2010, Nazmul Ahasan was appointed an additional judge in the High Court Division and became a full judge on 15 April 2012.

On 29 August 2019, Nazmul Ahasan and Justice K. M. Kamrul Kader issued a ruling that mandated portraits of Sheikh Mujibur Rahman be placed in all courtrooms of Bangladesh.

Nazmul Ahasan and Justice K. M. Kamrul Kader issued a ruling on 15 February 2020 that asked the government to make 7 March the "historic national day" commemorating the historic 7 March Speech of Bangabandhu Sheikh Mujibur Rahman.

Nazmul Ahasan and Justice K. M. Kamrul Kader issued a ruling on 10 March 2020 that declared the national slogan of Bangladesh to be Joy Bangla.

On 8 December 2020, Nazmul Ahasan and Justice Shahed Nuruddin issued an order asking the government to provide protection to monuments of President Sheikh Mujibur Rahman.

Nazmul Ahasan was made a Judge of the Appellate Division of Bangladesh Supreme Court on 9 January 2022. He was one month away from retirement on 15 February 2022 when he was promoted.

== Death ==
Nazmul Ahasan died from complications of COVID-19 at Bangabandhu Sheikh Mujib Medical University Hospital on 4 February 2022, at the age of 66.

Bangladesh Supreme Court suspended all activities of the court on 6 February 2022, in remembrance of Nazmul Ahasan.
