= Habibur Rahman Dayal =

Bangladeshi politician

Member of Bangladesh Parliament
- In office February 1996 – June 1996
- Preceded by: Akhtaruzzaman Ranjan
- Succeeded by: Akhtaruzzaman Ranjan

Personal details
- Party: Bangladesh Nationalist Party

Habibur Rahman Dayal is a Bangladesh Nationalist Party politician and a former member of parliament for Kishoreganj-2.

== Career ==
Dayal was elected to parliament from Kishoreganj-2 as a Bangladesh Nationalist Party candidate in February 1996.
