= Kishoreganj-2 =

Constituency of Bangladesh's Jatiya Sangsad

- Constituency for the Jatiya Sangsad
- District: Kishoreganj District
- Division: Dhaka Division
- Electorate: 417,420 (2018)

Current constituency
- Created: 1984
- Member of Parliament: Jalal Uddin Jalal
- ← 162 Kishoreganj-1 164 Kishoreganj-3 →

Kishoreganj-2 is a constituency represented in the Jatiya Sangsad (National Parliament) of Bangladesh.

== Boundaries ==
The constituency encompasses Katiadi, and Pakundia upazilas.

== Members of Parliament ==
Election	Member	Party
1986	Mohammad Nuruzzaman	Jatiya Party (Ershad)
1991	Akhtaruzzaman	BNP
Feb 1996	Habibur Rahman Dayal	BNP
Jun 1996	Akhtaruzzaman	BNP
2001	M. A. Mannan	Bangladesh Awami League
2014	Md. Suhrab Uddin	Bangladesh Awami League
2018	Nur Mohammad	Bangladesh Awami league
2024	Md. Suhrab Uddin	Independent
2026	Jalal Uddin Jalal	BNP

== Elections ==
=== Elections in the 2010s ===
General Election 2018: Kishoreganj-2
Party	Candidate	Votes	%	±%
AL	Nur Mohammad	295,860		
Gano Forum	Akhtaruzzaman	51,323		
IAB	Md. Salauddin	2,252		

=== Election in the 2000s ===
General Election 2008: Kishoreganj-2
Party	Candidate	Votes	%	±%
AL	M. A. Mannan	172,341	62.0	
BNP	Idris Ali Bhuiyan	99,522	35.8	
Independent	Md. Anisuzzaman Khokon	1,895	0.7	
BTF	Shorab Uddin Ahammed	1,064	0.4	
Independent	M Shafiur Rahman Khan Bachchu	718	0.3	
CPB	Sayed Nazrul islam	700	0.3	
BDB	Md. Yusuf	597	0.2	
KSJL	Md. Abu Taher	269	0.1	
Majority		72,819	26.2	
Turnout		278,055		
AL hold				
