= Asaduzzaman Mia =

Bangladeshi police officer (born 1960)

- আছাদুজ্জামান মিয়া
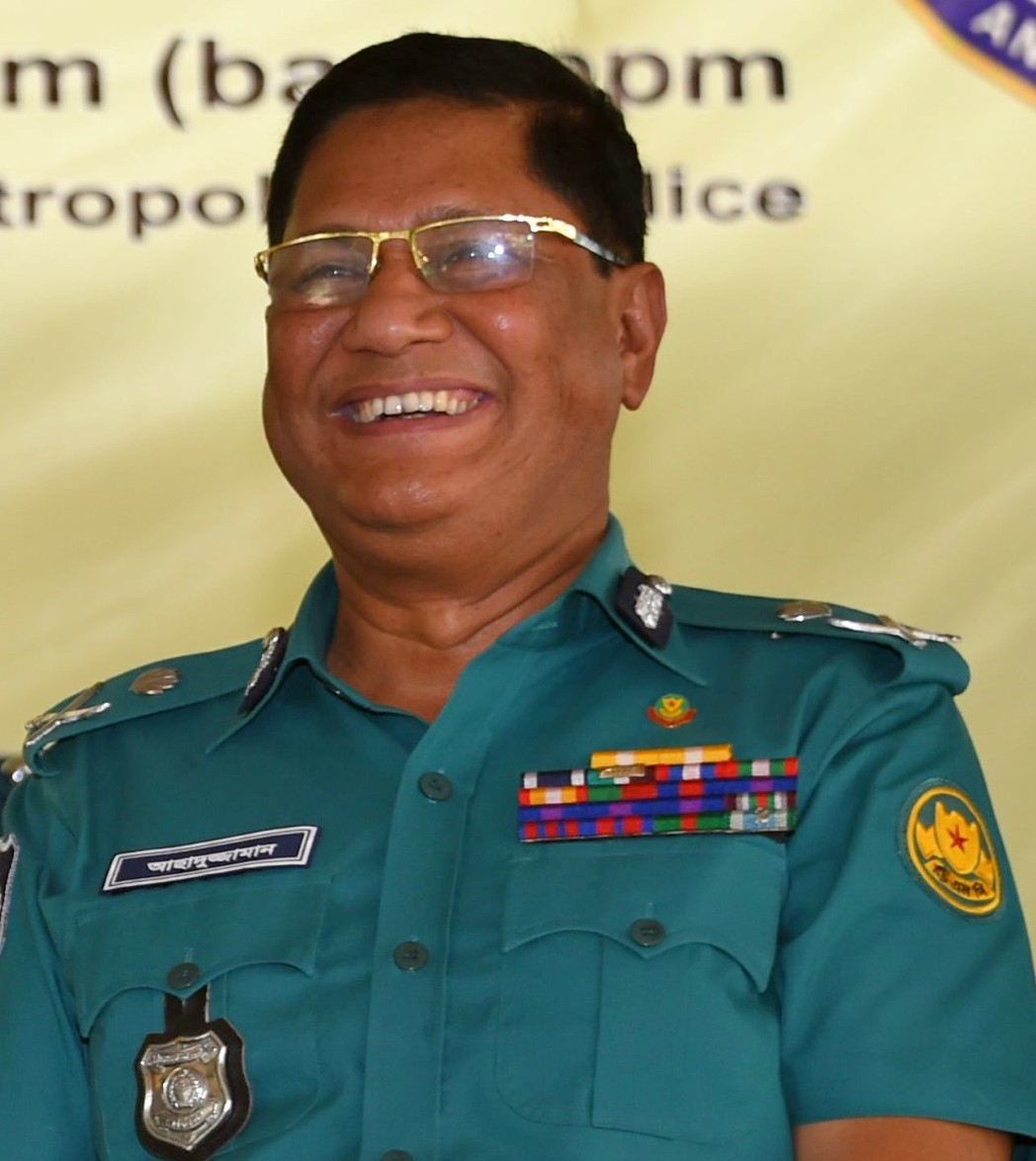
- Mia at the U.S. Embassy, Dhaka (2017)

CEO of National Security Affairs Cell
- In office 14 September 2019 – 14 September 2022

32nd Police Commissioner of Dhaka Metropolitan Police
- In office 7 January 2015 – 13 September 2019
- Preceded by: Benazir Ahmed
- Succeeded by: Shafiqul Islam

Personal details
- Born: 14 August 1960 (age 65) Faridpur, East Pakistan, Pakistan
- Education: Bangladesh Police Academy
- Police career
- Allegiance: Bangladesh
- Branch: Bangladesh Police
- Service years: 1988 - 2019
- Status: Retired
- Rank: Addl. IGP

Asaduzzaman Mia (born 14 August 1960) is a retired Bangladeshi police officer who served as the 33rd police commissioner of Dhaka Metropolitan Police, the longest serving commissioner, and a former chief executive officer of the National Security Affairs Cell under the Cabinet Division. During his tenure as DMP Commissioner, Dhaka Metropolitan Police was considered to be at its peak.

On 12 September 2024, Mia was arrested by the Rapid Action Battalion in Mohakhali, Dhaka. He was wanted in a case filed with the Khilgaon Police Station in connection with the death of Nuruzzaman Jony, a former general secretary of the Khilgaon Thana unit of Bangladesh Jatiotabadi Chatra Dal, in police custody in 2015.

== Early life ==
Mia was born on 14 August 1960 at Alfadanga in Faridpur District of the then East Pakistan (now Bangladesh). After completing his master's, he joined the Bangladesh Police as an assistant police superintendent on 15 February 1988.

== Career ==
Mia served in the Chittagong Railway Police in 2001. He was then transferred to the Syedpur Railway Police. He was then transferred to the Armed Police Battalion in Bogra District. He served at the Police Training Center in Noakhali District. During the 2001 to 2006 Bangladesh Nationalist Party government rule, Mia was discriminated against in promotion along with other police officers from Faridpur District, Gopalganj District, and Hindu officers, as they were perceived to be supporters of the Awami League.

Mia served as the superintendent of police in Sunamganj, Pabna, Tangail, Chittagong, and Saidpur. He was the CO of the first Armed Police Battalion in Bogra. He was the additional deputy inspector general and commandant of Noakhali Police Training Center. He also served in Khulna, Chittagong, Dhaka, and highway range as a DIG. He was promoted to additional inspector general of police in December 2015.

Mia was the 33rd commissioner of Dhaka Metropolitan Police, serving from 7 January 2015 to 13 September 2019. It was during his tenure that the July 2016 Dhaka attack took place.

During the Holey Artisan Attack, as the DMP Commissioner, Asaduzzaman Mia, and several officers struck inside and opened fire on the militants in an attempt to rescue civilians from the site. 9 people were brought back from the site in the attempt. Prime Minister Sheikh Hasina was briefed by the commissioner, and she instructed him to move away with his men and informed him that Army Chief Belal Shafiul Huq was on his way from Sylhet.

During his tenure as the DMP Commissioner, arrests without warrants were brought down by 99%, a general diary (GD) format was introduced in every police station, an e-traffic prosecution system was introduced, and information of Dhaka residents was stored on a digital database to reduce crimes.

Mia introduced the 'Citizen Information Management System' (CIMS), which collected the information of over 7.2 million citizens. This prevented individuals from renting out or renting a house without a lease information form. This soon became a driving force in eradicating major terrorist hideout dens in the capital and decreased theft, robbery, and extortion. In 2018, a list of the top 100 drug traders in the capital was made, leading to a massive crackdown.

Mia served as an instrumental figure in bringing discipline to the city's traffic system. He began a month-long special traffic programme following the 2018 road safety protests in Dhaka. Buses were prevented from stopping except at the designated stoppages and had fixed 121 spots as bus stoppages. During the programme He urged the city dwellers to use the zebra crossing, footbridges, and underpasses to cross roads and not to risk their lives crossing the road amid traffic. He prevented unregistered rickshaws on the city roads and made it mandatory for drivers of buses to put up their mobile phone number and photograph on the buses. He banned run down transport vehicles called Laguna in Dhaka.

Mia served as the president of the Bangladesh Police Service Association three times. In 2016, Mia was elected president of the committee, while Harun Ur Rashid, then SP of Gazipur, was made general secretary. In 2017, Mia was elected president for a second time, while Monirul Islam, chief of the Counter Terrorism and Transnational Crime unit of the DMP under Mia, was made general secretary. Mia served last as the president in 2018, being re-elected president for a third time before his retirement in 2019.

Mia was the recipient of the Bangladesh Police Medal (Bravery) (BPM) twice, in 2017 and 2019, respectively. He has also been awarded the President's Police Medal (Bravery) twice.

In August 2019, the government cancelled his retirement and extended his term in office. His tenure at the Dhaka Metropolitan Police was extended by one month. He was made the chief executive officer of the newly formed National Security Affairs Cell on 14 September 2019.

== Allegations of corruption ==
In June 2024, media reports Mia and his family own several plots, apartments, and lands in Dhaka. According to media reports, his wife owns a plot and two apartments, and his daughter owns a flat in Dhaka. His wife and children own 67 decimals of land in Dhaka, Gazipur and Narayanganj while his family and kin own 166 decimals of land in these three districts
