= SM Mizanur Rahman =

Bangladeshi police officer

Director General of Rapid Action Battalion
- In office 3 November 2006 – 13 February 2007
- Preceded by: Khoda Baks Chowdhury
- Succeeded by: Baharul Alam

Commissioner of Dhaka Metropolitan Police
- Preceded by: Ashraful Huda
- Succeeded by: Naim Ahmed
- Police career
- Allegiance: Bangladesh
- Branch: Bangladesh Police
- Service years: 1979-2010
- Status: Retired
- Rank: Additional IGP

SM Mizanur Rahman is a retired Bangladeshi police officer and former director general of the Rapid Action Battalion. He also served as commissioner of the Dhaka Metropolitan Police.

== Career ==
Rahman served in senior positions within the Bangladesh Police, including the Dhaka Metropolitan Police, CID, and Rapid Action Battalion.

He was appointed commissioner of the Dhaka Metropolitan Police in 2005, shortly before the 2004 Dhaka grenade attack, following the departure of commissioner Ashraful Huda.

During his tenure, he oversaw multiple administrative and operational actions, including the closure of the officer-in-charge of Motijheel Thana in a murder-related case and the opening of six new police stations under the Dhaka Metropolitan Police in June 2005. He also handled law-and-order issues involving religious and political tensions during his tenure.

He was later appointed director general of the Rapid Action Battalion on 3 November 2006, serving until 13 February 2007. He was preceded by Khoda Baks Chowdhury and succeeded by Baharul Alam.

During administrative reshuffles in late 2006, he also served briefly in senior roles connected to the police headquarters and CID.

Rahman went on leave preparatory to retirement in 2012.
