= Anisuzzaman Khokon =

Bangladeshi politician

Member of Bangladesh Parliament
- In office 18 February 1979 – 12 February 1982

Personal details
- Party: Bangladesh Nationalist Party

Anisuzzaman Khokon (Bengali: আনিসুজ্জামান খোকন) is a Bangladesh Nationalist Party politician and a former member of parliament for Mymensingh-19.

== Career ==
Khokon was elected to parliament from Mymensingh-19 as a Bangladesh Nationalist Party candidate in 1979.

Khokon contested the 2026 election as an independent candidate.

== Personal life ==
Khokon's elder brother is Akhtaruzzaman Ranjan, former member of parliament and Bangladesh Jamaat-e-Islami politician.
