= A. M. M. Aminur Rahman =

A. M. M. Aminur Rahman is a retired Bangladeshi police officer and commissioner of Dhaka Metropolitan Police. He is a former additional Inspector General of the Pakistan Special Police Establishment. He is a former director of the National Security Intelligence.

== Early life ==
Rahman was born on 1 January 1923. He has a masters of art.

== Career ==
Rahman joined the Indian Civil Service as a Deputy Magistrate and Sub-Deputy Collector on 18 October 1947. He joined the Police Service on 16 June 1948 as an deputy superintendent of police.

Rahman was the Superintendent of Police of the Special Police Establishment in East Pakistan in 1966. He graduated from the International Police Academy, Washington, D. C. in 1969. In 1970, he was transferred to Rawalpindi as the Deputy Inspector General of the Pakistan Special Police Establishment. Later promoted to Additional Inspector General of Police. He supported Pakistan during the Bangladesh Liberation War.

Following the assassination of Sheikh Mujibur Rahman, Rahman found himself in a good position with the government of Ziaur Rahman. This was part of a rehabilitation of collaborators of Pakistan in the security establishment of the new regime. He was appointed commissioner of the Dhaka Metropolitan Police. He later served director of the National Security Intelligence.

Rahman donated two million BDT to the President Kazi Rafiqul Alam of the Dhaka Ahsania Mission for the Ahsania Mission Cancer Hospital.

== Personal life ==
Rahman is married to Tahera Rahman.
