= National Security Affairs Cell =

Government agency of Bangladesh

- জাতীয় নিরাপত্তা সংক্রান্ত সেল
- Government Seal of Bangladesh

Agency overview
- Formed: 14 September 2019; 6 years ago
- Jurisdiction: Bangladesh
- Headquarters: Bangladesh Secretariat, Dhaka
- Agency executive: Md Mazharul Haque^{[4]}, Chief Executive Officer
- Parent department: Cabinet Division
- Parent agency: Government of Bangladesh

The National Security Cell(formally known as the National Security Affairs Cell) is a branch under the Cabinet Division of Bangladesh tasked with reviewing the activities and problems relating to internal state security. It operates under the support of the National Committee on Security Affairs (NCSA). Asaduzzaman Mia is the first chief executive officer (CEO) of the cell. He was made CEO on 14 September 2019. The National Security Cell is currently led by Chief Executive Officer Md Mazharul Haque.

== See also ==
- National Committee for Intelligence Coordination
