= Mosleh Uddin Ahmed (police) =

Bangladeshi police officer

- মোসলেহ্ উদ্দিন আহমদ

39th Police Commissioner of Dhaka Metropolitan Police
- Incumbent
- Assumed office 18 May 2026
- Appointed by: Minister of Home Affairs
- Preceded by: Md. Sarwar

Personal details
- Education: Bangladesh Police Academy
- Awards: Bangladesh Police Medal - Service
- Police career
- Allegiance: Bangladesh
- Branch: Bangladesh Police
- Service years: 1995-present
- Status: Active
- Rank: Additional IGP

Mosleh Uddin Ahmed is a Bangladeshi police officer. He is the 39th commissioner of the Dhaka Metropolitan Police (DMP). Before that, he was chief of the Criminal Investigation Department (CID).

== Early life and education ==
Ahmed was born into a Muslim family.

He earned an MBA in operation management and a MACPM degree in applied criminology and police management.

== Career ==
Ahmed began his career in the Bangladesh Police through the 15th Bangladesh Civil Service (BCS) examination. During his service, he held several important positions in different units of the Bangladesh Police, including deputy inspector general (DIG) at Police Headquarters and additional inspector general of police (logistics and asset acquisition).

He also served as a police liaison officer in a United Nations peacekeeping mission. Most recently, he served as the head of the Criminal Investigation Department of Bangladesh Police. Additionally, he has served in the Dhaka Metropolitan Police (DMP) and the Chattogram Metropolitan Police (CMP). Ahmed also held the position of superintendent of police in various districts, including Kushtia, Bhola and Sherpur.

He participated in training programs, seminars and conferences in several countries, including Australia, Singapore, Japan, China and Malaysia. Recently, he was elected president of the Bangladesh Police Service Association.

== Personal life ==
He is the father of two daughters and one son. His wife is a doctor.
