= Saiful Islam Duke =

Bangladeshi military personnel

- সাইফুল ইসলাম ডিউক
- Born: 30 November 1967 (age 58); Feni, East Pakistan, Pakistan
- Children: 1
- Relatives: Shahrin Islam Tuhin (brother); M. Rafiqul Islam (father)
- Military career
- Allegiance: Bangladesh
- Branch: Bangladesh Navy
- Service years: 1989–2004
- Rank: Lieutenant Commander

Saiful Islam Duke is a retired lieutenant commander of the Bangladesh Navy. He is the nephew of former prime minister Khaleda Zia.

== Career ==
Duke and his brother in law, Directorate General of Forces Intelligence officer Lieutenant Colonel Saiful Islam Joarder were charged with involvement in the 2004 Dhaka grenade attack on former prime minister Sheikh Hasina. He is accused of aiding Maulana Tajuddin, main supplier of the grenades used in the attack and member of terrorist groups based in Pakistan, in fleeing Bangladesh. he along with the other accused were indicted on 19 March 2012. Duke was arrested on 27 August 2010 by the Criminal Investigation Department. He is currently being tried for his role in the attacks. He had secured bail in the case in 2014.

== Personal life ==
Duke's father, Rafiqul Islam Chowdhury, was a professor of economics and dean at the University of Rajshahi and the former VC of Islamic University, Bangladesh. Duke's mother, Selima Islam, is the eldest sister of former prime minister Khaleda Zia and a descendant of Murad Khan, a 16th-century Middle Eastern immigrant.
