= Subrata Bain =

Bangladeshi criminal and gang leader

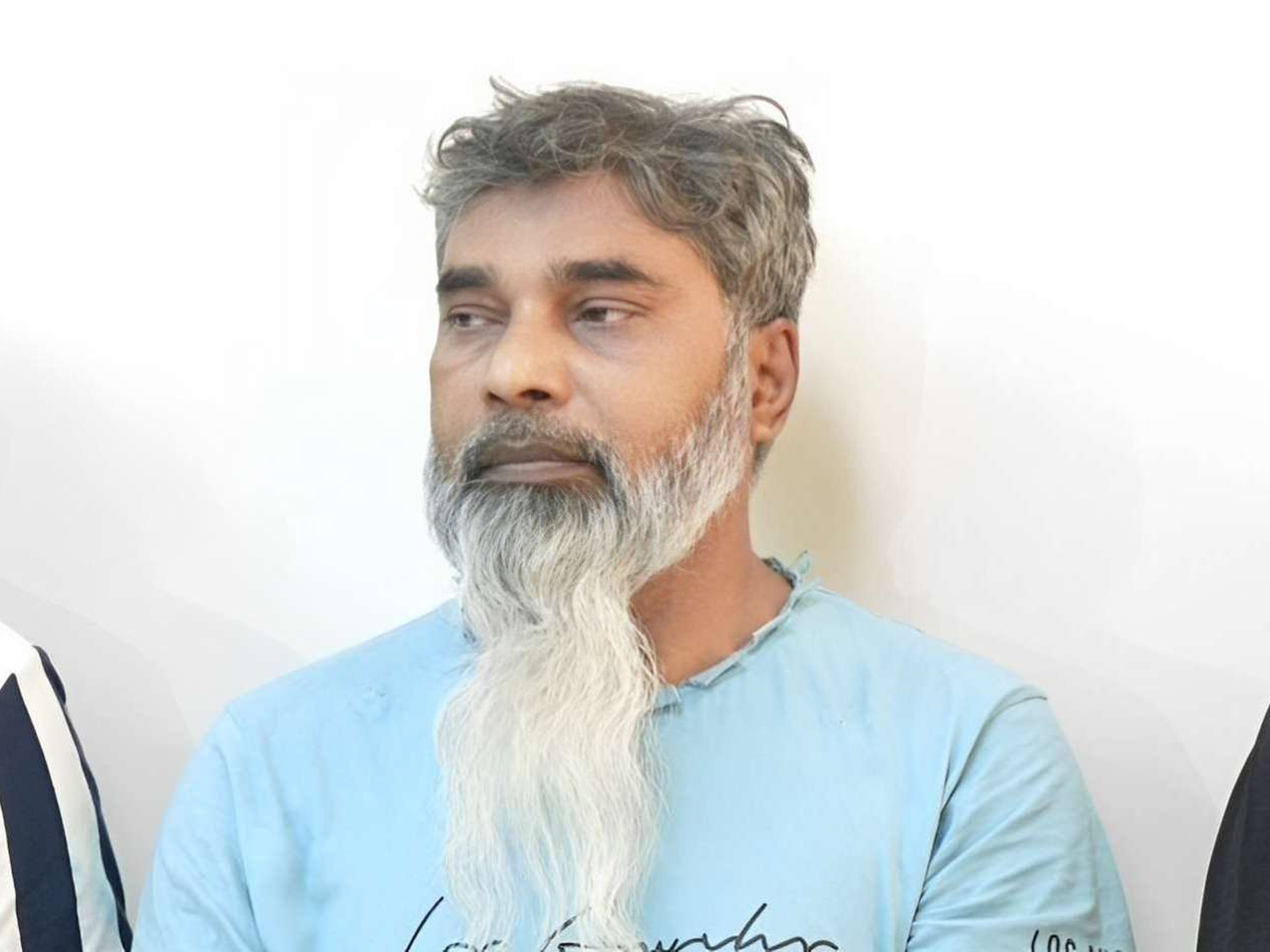
- Bain in 2025
- Born: Trimati Subrata Bain; 1967 (age 58–59); Dacca, East Pakistan, Pakistan (present-day Bangladesh)
- Other name: Fateh Ali
- Education: Secondary education
- Years active: 1990s – present
- Organization(s): Seven Star Group (leader, until 2003)
- Known for: crimes
- Criminal charge: Murder
- Criminal penalty: Life imprisonment (for the 1991 murder of JSD student leader Murad)
- Criminal status: Arrested (since 2025)

Subrata Bain (Bengali: সুব্রত বাইন, born as Trimati Subrata Bain in 1967, also known as Fateh Ali) is a Bangladeshi criminal and gang leader. In the 1990s, Subrata Bain became a prominent name in Dhaka's underworld. He faces numerous allegations including murder, land and flat grabbing, extortion, and arms smuggling. He is accused in at least 30 murder cases in Dhaka. Until 2003, he was the head of Dhaka's powerful underworld group, the Seven Star Group. He first gained notoriety after murdering JSD student leader Murad in Agargaon, Dhaka, in 1991, for which he was convicted of life imprisonment.

== Early life ==
Subrata Bain was born in 1967 at Holy Family Hospital in Dhaka. His father, Bipul Bain, worked as a driver for an NGO. He lived in a rented home in Moghbazar with his mother and three sisters. He started his schooling at Oxford Mission School in Barisal, then enrolled in class IX at Sher-e-Bangla School in Dhaka, from where he passed SSC examination. While trying to get into Siddheshwari College, he met a political leader, which led him into the world of crime. He eventually built his own gang in Moghbazar.

== Criminal activity ==
In the 1990s, Bain's name became synonymous with tender manipulation, land and flat grabbing, and extortion. Areas like Moghbazar, Ramna, Karwan Bazar, and Madhubagh were under his control. He also had close ties with politics, especially with senior leaders from the BNP, including then Minister of Home Affairs. He fought with Liaquat of the Jubo League for control of Moghbazar.

In 2001, Bangladesh's Ministry of Home Affairs listed Bain among 23 top criminals with bounties on their heads. That year, an Interpol red notice was issued against him, which remains active. To evade arrest, he fled to India in 2003. There he started businesses, bought land, and built a house.

Although Kolkata police arrested him on 11 October 2008, he was released on bail and went into hiding again. On 22 September 2009, while being pursued by Kolkata police's special task force, he escaped to Kakarbhitta, a town on the Nepal border, and was arrested by Nepali police. For public misconduct, he was sent to Bhadrapur Jail in eastern Nepal and later transferred to Jhumka prison. On 8 November 2012, he escaped by digging a 77-foot tunnel with 10 others. They used sharpened bamboo tools to dig the tunnel and escaped at night.

=== Involvement in 2004 grenade attack ===
Bain, as leader of the Seven Star Gang, was falsely implicated in the 2004 Dhaka grenade attack. A fabricated confession claimed his group's involvement, but later investigations revealed the actual attackers were linked to extremist networks.

== Arrests ==
Bain was arrested multiple times. The first was on 11 October 2008 in Kolkata. After escaping from a Nepal jail, he returned to Kolkata and was again arrested in a joint operation on 27 November 2012 in Burrabazar. A 9mm pistol was recovered from him during the arrest. In India, he was tried for illegal entry and possessing firearms.

Most recently, on 27 May 2025, he was captured along with an associate in an operation by the Bangladesh Army in the Kalishankarpur area of Kushtia town. His name has come up in connection with three murders in the Hatirjheel and Gulshan areas of Dhaka. On 21 April 2025, Arif Sardar, a member of the Ward Jubo Dal, was shot dead by Bain's followers in Hatirjheel. Police reported that he and his gang had been bringing weapons across the border from India and committing various crimes.
