= Mohammad Nuruzzaman (Kishoreganj politician) =

Bangladeshi politician

Member of Bangladesh Parliament
- In office 1986–1988
- In office 1988–1990

Personal details
- Party: Jatiya Party (Ershad)

Mohammad Nuruzzaman (Bengali: মোহাম্মদ নুরুজ্জামান) is a Jatiya Party (Ershad) politician and a former member of parliament for Kishoreganj-2.

== Career ==
Nuruzzaman was elected to parliament from Kishoreganj-2 as a Jatiya Party candidate in 1986 and 1988.
