= Naim Ahmed =

Naim Ahmed, also spelled Naeem Ahmed, is a retired additional inspector general and former commissioner of the Dhaka Metropolitan Police. He is a former principal of the Bangladesh Police Academy. He was the rector of Police Staff College. He is the former chief of the Special Branch.

== Career ==
Ahmed had served as the Deputy Inspector General of Rajshahi Range. He was appointed chief of the Special Branch replacing ABM Bazlur Rahman in January 2007. He served in that position for 48 hours.

Ahmed was appointed commissioner of the Dhaka Metropolitan Police in January 2007. He was awarded the President Police Medal in April 2007 by Chief Adviser of the Caretaker government Fakhruddin Ahmed. He allowed Harkatul Jihad Al Islami-Bangladesh to launch a political party called Islamic Democratic Party with support from the caretaker government.

Ahmed inaugurated the building housing the newly created the command, control and communications systems of the Dhaka Metropolitan Police in August 2007. He established a complaint mechanism to lodge complaints against police officers. He participated in the Police Reform Project organized by the Ministry of Home Affairs, Bangladesh Police, United Nations Development Programme, Department for International Development, and Bangladesh Election Commission. He launched the Special Women Police Contingent saying "In many cases, male detectives do not have access to the world of women criminals. To deal with those criminals, women police and detectives will be helpful". He established the Political Intelligence Office of the Dhaka Metropolitan Police which was scrapped following criticism by Awami League and the Bangladesh Nationalist Party. He called for reforms to turn the police into a service-oriented organization.

Ahmed was the commissioner of the Dhaka Metropolitan Police during the Bangladesh Rifles revolt. His unit captured 100 mutineers who were trying to escape in civilian clothing. In March 2009, Ahmed was made the rector of Police Staff College. AKM Shahidul Huq replaced him as commissioner of the Dhaka Metropolitan Police.

From 31 January 2012 to 17 December 2015, Ahmed was the principal of the Bangladesh Police Academy. He oversaw the centenary celebration of the Police Academy in 2012 where Prime Minister Sheikh Hasina was the chief guest.
