= Khoda Baksh Chowdhury =

Bangladeshi government advisor (born 1952)

- খোদা বকশ চৌধুরী
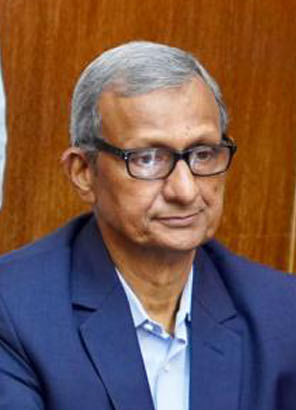
- Baksh in 2025

Special Assistant to the Chief Adviser for Ministry of Home Affairs
- In office 10 November 2024 – 24 December 2025
- Chief Adviser: Muhammad Yunus

Inspector General of Bangladesh Police
- In office 2 November 2006 – 29 January 2007
- President: Iajuddin Ahmed
- Prime Minister: Iajuddin Ahmed (acting); Fakhruddin Ahmed
- Preceded by: Anwarul Iqbal
- Succeeded by: Nur Mohammad

3rd Director General of Rapid Action Battalion
- In office 31 October 2006 – 2 November 2006
- President: Iajuddin Ahmed
- Prime Minister: Iajuddin Ahmed (acting)
- Preceded by: Abdul Aziz Sarkar
- Succeeded by: SM Mizanur Rahman

4th Chief Executive of Criminal Investigation Department
- In office 9 January 2006 – 1 November 2006
- Appointed by: Minister of Home Affairs
- Preceded by: Md. Amjad Hossain
- Succeeded by: SM Mizanur Rahman

Personal details
- Born: 15 August 1952 (age 73) Chittagong, East Bengal, Pakistan
- Education: Dhaka University (BA, MA)
- Awards: Bangladesh Police Medal (BPM); President Police Medal (PPM)
- Police career
- Allegiance: Bangladesh
- Branch: Bangladesh Police
- Service years: 1979 - 2009
- Status: Retired
- Rank: IGP

Khuda Baksh Chowdhury (born 15 August 1952) is a former inspector general of police of Bangladesh Police. He served as special assistant with the status equivalent to a Minister of State of the Interim government of Bangladesh.

He also served as the senior police advisor in UNAMA from June 2008 to April 2010.

== Education ==
Chowdhury obtained B.A. (Hons.) in political science (enrolled in 1969) and M.A. in public administration from the University of Dhaka.

== Career ==
Chowdhury joined the Bangladesh Police in 1979.

Chowdhury joined U.N. Administrative Mission UNTAES (United Nations Administration in Eastern Slavonia; part of Croatia now) in May 1996 and served the mission first as deputy sector chief and later sector chief of one of the two sectors of the mission. Few years later he joined UNMIBH (United Nations Mission in Bosnia Herzegovina), a monitoring mission, at Sarajevo in August 1999 and worked in the mission as deputy regional commander and regional commander, Sarajevo IPTF Region among a group of international civilian police officers. In 2001, he as a superintendent of police, would be promoted to inspector general in five years superseding many officers more senior than him.

Chowdhury was posted to CID as additional IGP on January 9, 2006. Chowdhury served as the president of Bangladesh Police Service Association (BPSA) in 2006. On 31 October 2006, he was appointed the DG of Rapid Action Battalion. 2 days later, he was promoted to inspector general of police of Bangladesh Police by replacing Anwarul Iqbal. He was posted as O.S.D. in January 2007 after successor neutral Fakhruddin Ahmed led caretaker government took office and retired voluntarily in July 2009.

Chowdhury worked as senior police advisor, UNAMA (United Nations Assistance Mission in Afghanistan), as a UN staff member from June 2008 to April 2010. He was elected as the 1st chair of Senior Police Advisory Group (SPAG) of International Police Coordination Board (IPCB). On completion of the tenure, UNDP Afghanistan contracted him as an international consultant. On 10 November 2024, Chowdhury was appointed the special assistant (status equivalent to a minister of state) to the chief adviser of the interim government of Bangladesh. He was given executive power over the Ministry of Home Affairs. Chowdhury resigned from the post on 24 December 2025.

== Controversies ==
=== 2004 Dhaka grenade attack case ===
In 2007, after the military-backed government assumed office, fresh investigation into the case was launched on the 2004 Dhaka grenade attack.

In July 2008, on completion of investigation CID prosecuted 22 accused and trial began. After Awami League formed government in 2009, prosecution filed a petition to launch further investigation into the incident in June 2009. In July 2011, 23 months after further investigation, CID submitted a supplementary chargesheet where many new names, mostly BNP leaders and some former officials of the government including the son of former prime minister Khaleda Zia, Tarique Rahman, former deputy minister Abdus Salam Pintu, former member of parliament Kazi Shah Mofazzal Hossain Kaikobad and some officials of the Home Ministry, Police, Directorate General of Forces Intelligence (DGFI), National Security Intelligence (NSI) and Prime Minister's Office (PMO) were added.

On 1 December 2024, high court acquitted Tarique Rahman, and 48 others in August 21 grenade attack cases. On 3rd September 2025, Appellate Division of the Supreme Court upheld the High Court verdict.
