= M. A. Mannan (neurologist) =

Bangladeshi politician

Member of Parliament for Kishoreganj-2
- In office 2001–2013
- Preceded by: Habibur Rahman Daulal
- Succeeded by: Md. Suhrab Uddin

Personal details
- Born: c. 1932
- Died: 16 July 2016 (aged 84) Dhaka, Bangladesh
- Resting place: Banani Graveyard, Dhaka
- Party: Bangladesh Awami League
- Occupation: Educator, politician
- Awards: Ekushey Padak (2015)

M. A. Mannan (c. 1932 – 16 July 2016) was a Bangladeshi educator. He was a Bangladesh Awami League Advisory Council member and former lawmaker. He was awarded Ekushey Padak in 2015 by the government of Bangladesh for his contribution to education. His home town is Kazirchar Uttorpara.

== Early life ==
M. A. Mannan was born on 2 December 1932 in Katiadi Upazila of Kishoreganj District, His father's name was Amber Ali and his mother's name was Sakhina Begum. He obtained his FCPS degree in internal medicine from the Bangladesh College of Physicians and Surgeons in 1987. His College is Sagardi College.

== Career ==
Mannan was an elected Awami League member of parliament (MP) from the Kishoreganj-2 (Katiadi-Pakundia) constituency in 2001 and 2008. He was the founding head of the Department of Neurology of Institute of Post Graduation and Medical Research (now named BSMMU). He was the founder-president of Neurology Foundation, Dhaka and Epilepsy Association of Bangladesh. He was also the founder of Bangladesh Tourism.

Mannan founded Dr Abdul Mannan Mohila College.
