= A. K. M. Shamsuddin =

Bangladeshi civil servant (1950–2022)

A. K. M. Shamsuddin was a secretary and High Commissioner of Bangladesh to Kenya.

== Early life ==
Shamsuddin was born in 1950 in Sirajganj District. He studied electrical engineering at the Bangladesh University of Engineering and Technology.

== Career ==
Shamsuddin worked at Bangladesh Railway from 1973 to 1992; he was an Assistant Electrical Engineer and later the Chief Electrical Engineer.

From 1992 to 1996, Shamsuddin was the deputy secretary of the Ministry of Power, Energy and Mineral Resources. He served as the chairman of the state-owned Padma Oil Company Limited and Bangladesh Gas Fields Company Limited. He was the Chief of Electrical Inspector from 1998 to 1999.

From 2000 to 2004, Shamsuddin was working at the Bangladesh Hydrocarbon Unit. He was the chair of the South Asian Association for Regional Cooperation Technical Committee of Energy. He was the secretary in-charge of the Ministry of Expatriates Welfare and Overseas Employment in 2005.

Shamsuddin was the secretary of the Ministry of Primary and Mass Education. He implemented the Primary Education Development Programme-2 and received an award from the Asian Development Bank. In November 2006, he was appointed President of the Bangladesh Bridge Federation. He retired in 2007.

Shamsuddin was appointed High Commission of Bangladesh to Kenya in February 2008. He had concurrent accreditation to Ghana, Mauritius, Tanzania, and Uganda.

== Death ==
Shamsuddin died on 26 July 2022 from COVID-19.
