= Law enforcement in Angola =

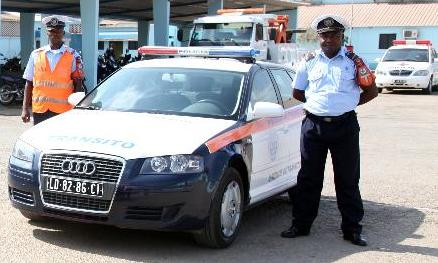
The national police in Angola.

Law enforcement in Angola is run by the Government of Angola. The National Police Force (PN) is a paramilitary body controlled by the Ministry of the Interior.

== History ==
Law enforcement has its origins in the Polícia de Segurança Pública of Portuguese Angola. On 28 February 1976, the National Police was founded via an oath taking ceremony for 383 policemen at the National Public Order Police School. It was founded as the People's Police Corps of Angola and the Police Corps of Angola.

During the COVID-19 pandemic in Angola, police killed teenagers during lockdown enforcement. In September 2020, protests erupted following the death of a doctor while in police custody, who had been arrested for failing to wear a mask. The protests utilised the hashtag #NaoABrutalidadePolicial (English: "no police brutality") while doctors led a march in Luanda. That same month, police chief Paulo de Almeida condemned the "bad actions" of "some officers" and asked for the public not to lose trust in the police.

== See also ==
- List of law enforcement agencies
