= Md. Suhrab Uddin =

Bangladeshi politician

- মোঃ সোহরাব উদ্দিন

Member of the Bangladesh Parliament for Kishoreganj-2
- In office 30 January 2024 – 06 August 2024
- Preceded by: Nur Mohammad
- In office 05 January 2014 – 30 December 2018
- Preceded by: M.A. Mannan
- Succeeded by: Nur Muhammad

Personal details
- Born: 1 June 1956 (age 70) Barisal, East Bengal, Dominion of Pakistan
- Party: Bangladesh Awami League
- Education: B.Com, L.LB.
- Profession: Advocate & Tax Advisor

Md. Suhrab Uddin (born 01 June 1956) is a Bangladeshi Lawyer, Tax Professional and Politician Bangladesh Awami League. He also served as a Member of Parliament representing the Kishoreganj-2 constituency.

== Early life ==
Md. Suhrab Uddin was born on 01 June 1956 in Kishoreganj District. He has a Bachelor of Law & Bachelor of law.

== Career ==
Suhrab Uddin was elected to Parliament on 5 January 2014 from Kishoreganj-2 as a Bangladesh Grand Alliance candidate. He is a member of the Treasury Bench in the Parliament. He was elected a member of parliament on the nomination of Bangladesh Awami League. Later again in 2024, he was elected as a member of Parliament in the twelfth national parliament election as an independent candidate in the eagle symbol.
