= Anwarul Iqbal =

Bangladeshi police officer and politician

Inspector General of Bangladesh Police
- In office 6 July 2006 – 2 November 2006
- Preceded by: Abdul Kaium
- Succeeded by: Khoda Baksh Chowdhury

Personal details
- Born: 1949 or 1950
- Died: 15 January 2015 (aged 65) Dubai, United Arab Emirates
- Education: Chittagong University (MA)
- Police career
- Allegiance: Bangladesh
- Branch: Bangladesh Police
- Service years: 1973–2006
- Rank: Inspector General of Police

Anwarul Iqbal (born 1949 or 1950; died 2015) was a Bangladeshi police officer and an adviser to the caretaker government from 2007 to 2009.

Iqbal was a freedom fighter in the Bangladesh Liberation War. He joined the Bangladesh Police in 1973 and worked in numerous branches of the service. He also served in senior positions in the police contingents of UN peacekeeping missions to Mozambique and Angola. When the Rapid Action Battalion (RAB) was formed in 2004, he was chosen as its first director general and led it until April 2005. From July to November 2006, he was inspector general of police (IGP), the highest position in the police force. He was awarded the President Police Medal and was awarded the Bangladesh Police Medal twice.

Months after retiring from the police, Iqbal was appointed an adviser to the caretaker government led by Fakhruddin Ahmed. At first he was given charge of two ministries: the Ministry of Local Government, Rural Development and Co-operatives, and the Ministry of Labour and Employment. Later, he was put in charge of the Ministry of Textiles and Jute as well. He served until elections were held two years later.

== Education ==
Iqbal earned a master's degree in Bengali literature at the University of Chittagong. He was a freedom fighter in the Bangladesh Liberation War.

== Career ==
=== Police ===
Iqbal joined the Bangladesh Police on 22 August 1973. During his career, he would serve in various units at the sub-district and district levels, as well as the Chittagong and Khulna Metropolitan Police, and the Armed Police Battalion. He would receive additional training at the Police Staff College, UK, and the UN Human Rights Centre, Geneva. Iqbal was awarded the President Police Medal in 1980 for his contributions to the police and the country. From July 1989 to July 1990, he was superintendent of police in Kushtia.

In the mid-1990s he participated in two UN peacekeeping missions. He was chief of staff of CIVPOL as part of ONUMOZ in Mozambique from December 1993 to December 1994. And he was police commissioner of UNAVEM III in Angola from March 1995 to June 1997. There CIVPOL monitored the neutrality of the Angolan National Police, the demobilization of UNITA forces, and the disarmament of civilians. Iqbal wrote that police too often arrived in Angola ill-prepared. Some were without necessary documents and uniforms, and morale was low. Too many lacked the language, driving, and technical skills needed. He urged better preparation and training. By this time he was a senior superintendent.

He was awarded the Bangladesh Police Medal (BPM) in 2000. After a stint as commissioner of the Dhaka Metropolitan Police from 26 July 2001 to 11 November 2001, he was moved to head the Criminal Investigation Department. A second BPM followed in 2002. He was additional inspector general of Special Branch in 2004.

In February 2004, he became the founding director general of the Rapid Action Battalion (RAB). The new unit soon developed a reputation for being aggressive. By the end of the year, there had been around 60 deaths in their custody, typically in what the RAB termed "crossfire". Iqbal pledged that all deaths in RAB custody would be investigated, and any extrajudicial killings would be prosecuted. Under his tenure, 133 RAB members were returned to the units they had come from as punishment for a range of offences, from breaches of discipline to robbery, corruption, and bribery. On 22 April 2005, he was transferred to police headquarters, and Abdul Aziz Sarkar replaced him as director general of the RAB.

On 6 July 2006, Iqbal became the inspector general of police (IGP), the top position in the force. At the beginning of November 2006, at the start of the 2006-2008 Bangladeshi political crisis, he was replaced by Khuda Baksh Chowdhury and made an officer on special duty. Days later, Iqbal took voluntary retirement, ending a 33-year police career.

=== Interim government 2007–2009 ===
On 11 January 2007, President Iajuddin Ahmed resigned as chief adviser of the caretaker government, as did most of his advisers. Fakhruddin Ahmed, a former Bangladesh Bank governor, was made chief adviser. Iqbal was sworn in as an adviser (equivalent to a cabinet minister) of the caretaker government on 16 January 2007. He was given charge of two ministries: the Ministry of Local Government, Rural Development and Co-operatives, and the Ministry of Labour and Employment. In September, he travelled to Singapore for medical treatment, accompanied by his wife, Dora Anwar.

Iqbal led the drafting of several ordinances meant to empower local government and reduce control by the central government. The president promulgated ordinances regarding a local government commission and upazila parishads. Their effects were short-lived, however, because the next elected government did not ratify them. They were annulled or repealed.

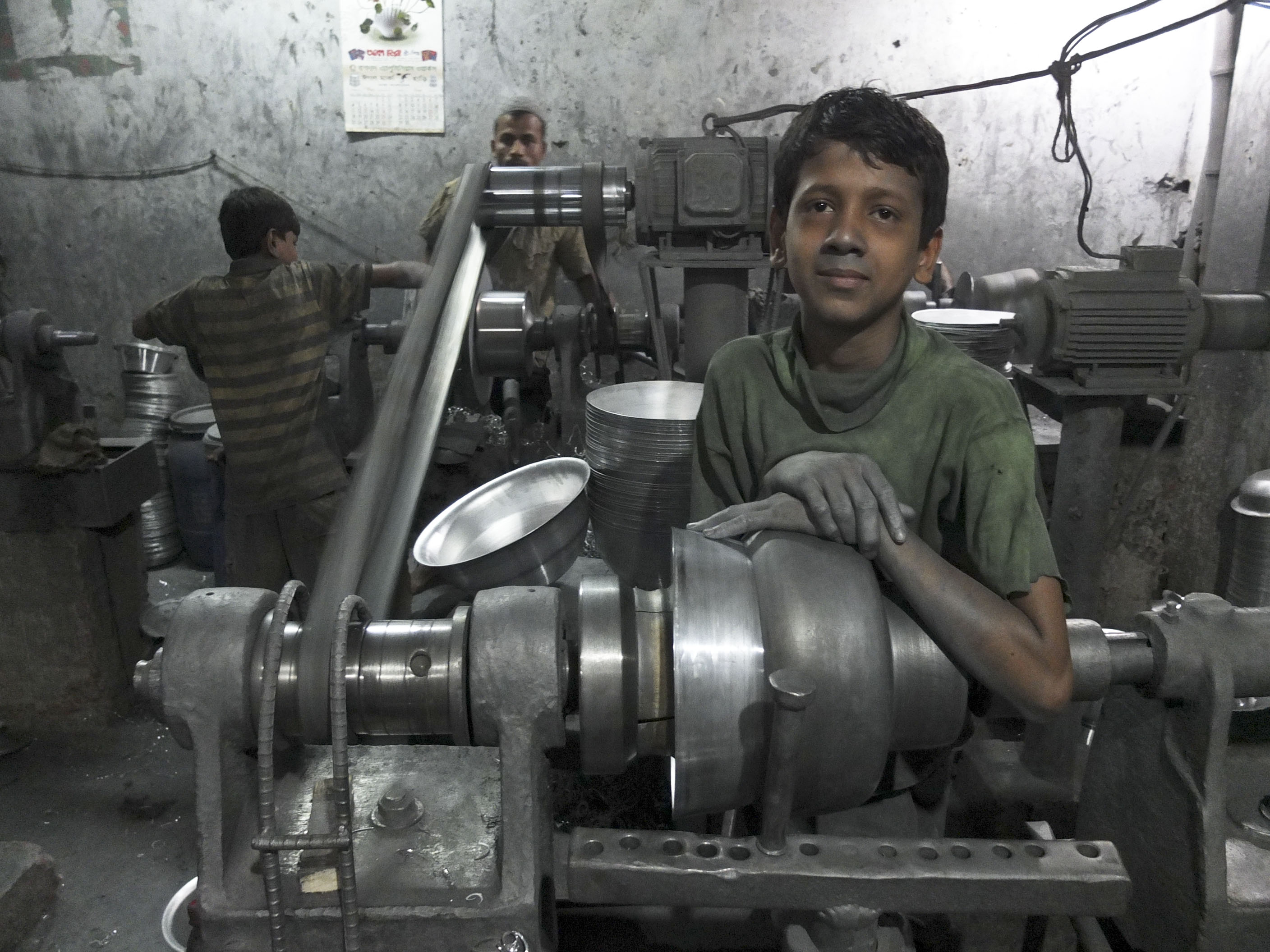
Child working in unsafe conditions in 2014

The newspaper New Age reported that in the first six months of the interim government, Iqbal failed to fully implement an agreement on minimum wages in the garment manufacturing sector. Also, the government's slum clearance activities made tens of thousands jobless. No provisions had been made to rehabilitate those evicted, even though legally required. A year later, Iqbal spoke at the International Labour Organization (ILO) conference. He told them that the government had strengthened vocational training for the unemployed. He also said they aimed to get 30,000 children out of hazardous jobs by providing non-formal education and other assistance.

The number of child labourers in Bangladesh at the time was estimated at 8.5 million, 1.4 million of whom were doing risky work. A bright spot in the government's attempt to phase out child labour was the percentage of the population who had birth certificates (issued under the ministry of local government). It rose from 12% in 2006 to 40% in 2008. The absence of proof of age had hitherto complicated enforcement of child labour laws.

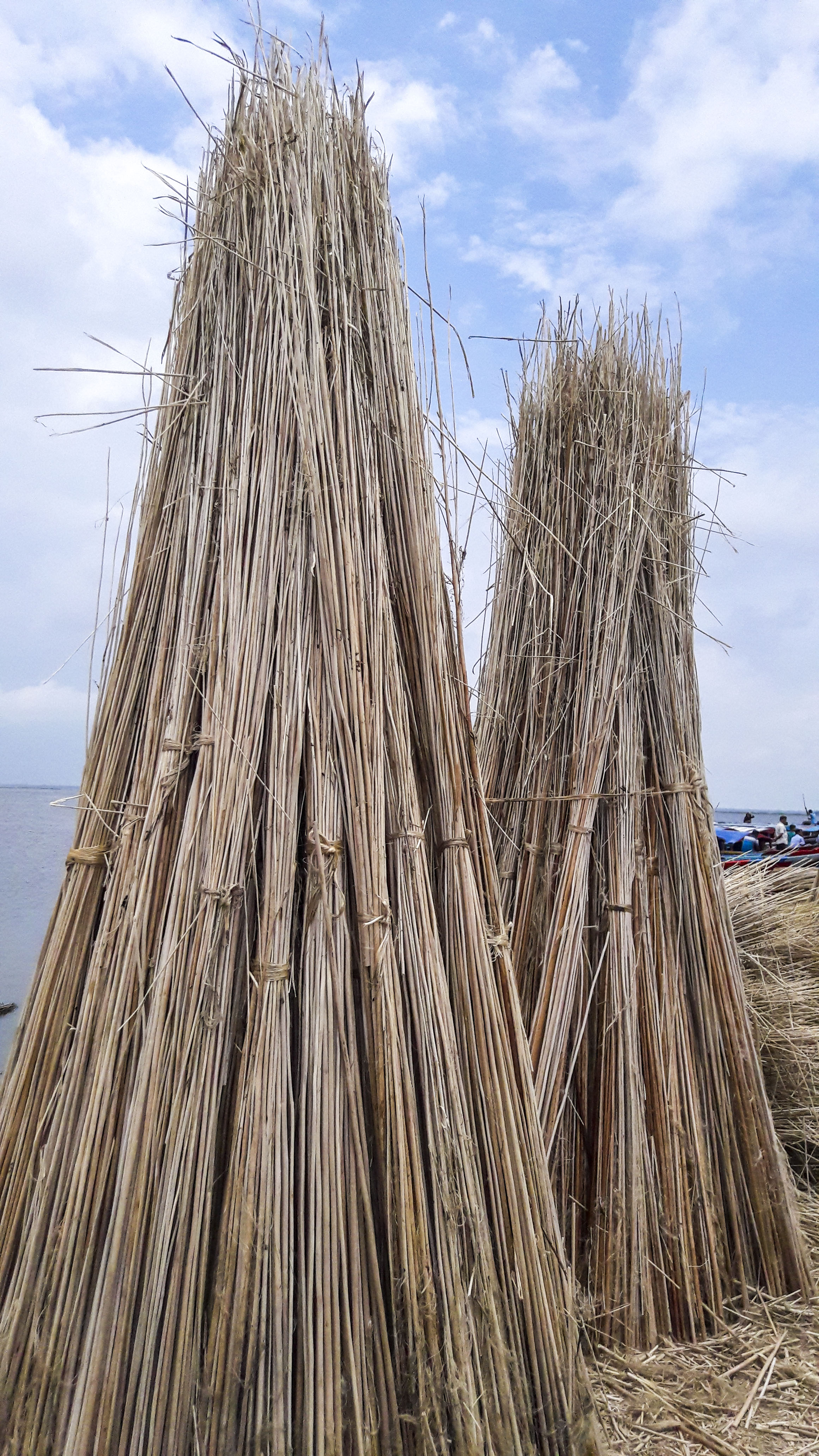
Jute stalks drying

On 15 January 2008, a third ministry was added to Iqbal's portfolio. The Ministry of Textiles and Jute was reallocated from Geetiara Safya Chowdhury to him. The government wanted to privatise money-losing jute mills. In pursuit of this goal, in July 2008 they leased five mostly inoperative state-run jute mills to private operators. The mills (Karnaphuli Jute Mills, MM Jute Mills, People's Jute Mills, Qaumi Jute Mills, and RR Jute Mills) continued to struggle with losses and closures under the next government.

A general election was held in December 2008 under the caretaker government. The Awami League-led Grand Alliance won a commanding victory, and shortly Sheikh Hasina formed a new government. Iqbal's time as an adviser ended on 6 January 2009.

== Death ==
At the end of his life Iqbal was living with his two daughters in Dubai, United Arab Emirates. He died there on 15 January 2015 at the age of 65 from a cardiac arrest, suffered while working out. He was buried at Banani graveyard.
