= Rezzakul Haider Chowdhury =

Bangladeshi military personnel

- Military career
- Allegiance: Bangladesh
- Branch: Bangladesh Army; Bangladesh Rifles
- Service years: 1977–2009
- Rank: Major General
- Unit: East Bengal Regiment
- Commands: Director General of National Security Intelligence; Director General of Directorate General of Forces Intelligence; Deputy Director General of Bangladesh Rifles; Commander of 72nd Infantry Brigade

19th Director General of Directorate General of Forces Intelligence
- In office 2005–2006
- President: Iajuddin Ahmed
- Prime Minister: Khaleda Zia
- Preceded by: Mohammad Abdul Halim
- Succeeded by: Sadik Hasan Rumi

Rezzakul Haider Chowdhury is a retired Bangladesh Army officer who is the former director of the Directorate General of Forces Intelligence and National Security Intelligence.

== Career ==
Chowdhury maintained regular contact with Tarique Rahman while at Directorate General of Forces Intelligence. He was the director general of Directorate General of Forces Intelligence from 2005 to 2006. He met with Paresh Baruah of the United Liberation Front of Asom to discuss smuggling arms for Indian separatist outfit. He also served as the directors general of the National Security Intelligence from 20 April 2008 to 17 March 2009.

Chowdhury was sentenced to death in 2014 for the 2004 arms and ammunition haul in Chittagong. The arms were destined for ULFA rebels in India. He held meetings with officials of ARY Group and the Pakistan intelligence agency ISI regarding the smuggling of arms. However, on 18 December 2024, he was acquitted by high court in this case. Chowdhury was sentenced to death in the 2004 Dhaka grenade attack which was an attempted assassination of Sheikh Hasina, former Prime Minister of Bangladesh and leader of Awami League. On 1 December 2024, he was acquitted by high court in August 21 grenade attack cases.

== See also ==
- Rezaqul Haider
