= Dhaka Metropolitan Police =

Unit of Bangladesh Police in Dhaka

Dhaka Metropolitan Police ঢাকা মেট্রোপলিটন পুলিশ
- Crest of Dhaka Metropolitan Police
- Common name: Police
- Abbreviation: DMP
- Motto: শান্তি শপথে বলিয়ান; En: Strength in the Pledge for Peace

Agency overview
- Formed: 1 February 1976
- Employees: 34,000

Jurisdictional structure
- Operations jurisdiction: Dhaka City, Dhaka, Bangladesh
- Map showing Dhaka, the DMP's primary jurisdiction
- Area: 1,600 km^{2} (620 sq mi)
- Population: 10,278,882 (2022)
- Governing body: Ministry of Home Affairs
- Constituting instrument: The Dhaka Metropolitan Police Ordinance, 1976
- General nature: Local civilian police

Operational structure
- Headquarters: 36 Shaheed Captain Mansur Ali Sarani, Ramna, Dhaka 1217
- Police officers: 3,317
- Minister responsible: Salahuddin Ahmed, Minister of Home Affairs
- Agency executive: Addl.IGP Mosleh Uddin Ahmed, Police Commissioner
- Parent agency: Bangladesh Police
- Special units: CTTC, SWAT, Detective Branch, City Special Branch

Facilities
- Stations: 50
- Armored vehicles: Otokar Cobra, IAG Guardian, STREIT Typhoon
- Helicopters: Bell 407

Website
- dmp.gov.bd

The Dhaka Metropolitan Police (Bengali: ঢাকা মেট্রোপলিটন পুলিশ, romanized: Ḍhākā mēṭrōpaliṭana puliśa; abbreviated as DMP) is the primary metropolitan unit of the Bangladesh Police, responsible for law enforcement, public safety, and crime prevention within the metropolis of Dhaka, the capital and most populous city of Bangladesh. Established in 1976 under the Dhaka Metropolitan Police Ordinance, DMP oversees policing operations, administration, and coordination with other law enforcement and emergency agencies in the city. The force is headed by a police commissioner who manages all operational and administrative functions. Mosleh Uddin Ahmed is the current DMP commissioner.

== History ==
During a major reorganization and expansion of Bangladesh's national police forces, the Dhaka Metropolitan Police (DMP) was established on 1 February 1976 to maintain law and order in the country's capital and largest city. It initially had 6,000 personnel in 12 police stations. With the rapid population growth of the city, the need for an expanded and better-equipped police force increased. The government planned a major expansion of police. Consequently, the establishment of 50 police stations has been completed. The number of personnel has been expanded, with newer ranks and officer corps. During the tenure of Asaduzzaman Mia as DMP Commissioner, general diary (GD) format was introduced in every police station, an e-traffic prosecution system was introduced, and information of Dhaka residents was stored on a digital database to reduce crimes.

Holey Artisan attack

The attack started at about 21:40 local time on 1 July 2016. Alerted by the gunfire, Dhaka Metropolitan Police detective Rabiul Karim and officer-in-charge Salauddin Khan started to investigate. Other police officers responded, arriving at the restaurant. The attackers then engaged in a shootout with the police. Police cordoned off the area around the restaurant and planned a rescue raid. The attackers however threw grenades and opened fire, killing officers Karim and Khan.

DMP Commissioner, Asaduzzaman Mia, and several officers struck inside and opened fire on the militants in an attempt to rescue civilians from the site. 9 people were brought back from the site in the attempt. Prime Minister Sheikh Hasina was briefed by the Commissioner and she instructed him to move away with his men and informed him the Army Chief Belal Shafiul Huq was on his way from Sylhet. He has been known as one of the figurehead who contributed in uprooting terrorism from the country.

== Organisation ==
The current strength stands at around more than 34,000 (including ministerial staff) personnel and 50 police stations. The DMP is divided into 42 divisions headed by five additional commissioners aided by joint commissioners, deputy commissioners, additional deputy commissioners and assistant commissioners. Here is the DMP organogram in brief:

1. Headquarters and administration: Additional commissioner administers the Dhaka Metropolitan Police headquarters. Joint commissioner assists with 10,500 officers by governing arms of the police, handling appointments, training, logistics, supplies and other administrative functions. Additional commissioner has 15 divisions under his supervision.
2. Crime and Operations commissioner administers and oversees the functions of all city police stations. Joint commissioners are responsible for providing security to VIPs, members of parliament, government officials, foreign dignitaries and others. Commissioner has 14 divisions under his supervision.
3. Detective and Criminal Intelligence: This division is responsible for fighting organised crime, homicide, theft, drug trafficking, crimes against women and human trafficking. He has 9 divisions under his supervision.
4. Traffic: Additional Commissioner (Traffic) is the traffic police of the city, regulating vehicular traffic, speed and parking laws, pedestrian and road security. Eight divisions are under his supervision.
5. Counter Terrorism and Transnational Crime is a specialized branch of Dhaka Metropolitan Police comprising 600 officers, formed in 2016, to tackle terrorism and transnational crime. There are seven divisions are under his supervision.

=== SWAT ===
The SWAT (Special Weapons And Tactics) is another elite tactical unit of the Dhaka Metropolitan Police which was established on 28 February 2009. SWAT is operated under the Special Action Group of Counter Terrorism and Transnational Crime of Dhaka Metropolitan Police.

=== Cyber Crime Investigation Division ===
The Cyber Security & Crime Division, more commonly known as the Cyber Crime Division, is a branch of Bangladesh Police which is operated under the Counter Terrorism and Transnational Crime of Dhaka Metropolitan Police.

=== SWPC ===
Female officers were first inducted into the DMP in 1978.

The Special Women Police Contingent (SWPC) of the Dhaka Metropolitan Police was created in 2008 to specifically track female criminals involved in activities such as prostitution, drug smuggling and human trafficking, theft, homicide and swindling. With increasing numbers of female criminals in Bangladesh, the SWPC, composed entirely of female officers, would be used to gather intelligence that men are seen as less capable of gathering.

The Special Women Police Contingent (SWPC) was established in 2008 with the objective of creating a specialized unit composed exclusively of women to investigate crimes involving female offenders. Bangladesh Narcotics Control Department reported that as many as 100,000 people were engaged in drug trafficking, of whom 40 percent were women. Bangladesh Police considered male officers to be less effective than women in gathering information and investigating crimes involving women and had already been using female police officers more in tackling crimes involving female criminals. As an all-women force, the SWPC is the first of its kind in Bangladesh's history.

Bangladesh Police plan to raise such units across the country. Currently, there are roughly 2,000 women officers in Bangladesh Police - less than two percent of the total force, and one-third of whom are deployed in Dhaka. Bangladesh Police plan to train and hire 3,000 women officers to bolster the SWPC. An assistant commissioner of police in charge of the Dhaka SWPC who leads a detective force of 24 women officers.

== Thana list of Dhaka Metropolitan Police ==
- Adabor
- Airport
- Badda
- Banani
- Bangshal
- Bhashantek
- Cantonment
- Chackbazar
- Dakshin Khan
- Darus-Salam
- Demra
- Dhanmondi
- Gandaria
- Gulshan
- Hatirjheel
- Hazaribagh
- Jattrabari
- Kadamtoli
- Kafrul
- Kalabagan
- Kamrangirchar
- Khilgaon
- Khilkhet
- Kotwali
- Lalbagh
- Mirpur Model
- Mohammadpur
- Motijheel
- Mugda
- New Market
- Pallabi
- Paltan Model
- Ramna Model
- Rampura
- Rupnagar
- Sabujbag
- Shah Ali
- Shahbag
- Shahjahanpur
- Sher e Bangla Nagar
- Shyampur
- Sutrapur
- Tejgaon
- Tejgaon Industrial
- Turag
- Uttar Khan
- Uttara East
- Uttara West
- Vatara
- Wari

The DMP also collaborates and maintains organizational links with the Bangladesh Ansar, Border Guard Bangladesh, Special Branch, Bangladeshi intelligence community, Rapid Action Battalion and other national security agencies.

== Controversies ==
- Mahbubur Rahman Sujon, a small trader, was arrested by sub-inspector Jahidur Rahman of Mirpur police station. He was killed in custody in July 2014. SI Jahidur, who was previously stationed in Pallabi area, was also involved in the custody death of Jony, arrested from a Mirpur Bihari camp. Jahidur was taken into custody as a murder case over the death of Sujon had been filed against him and six other accused in July 2014 after the incident. Sujon's wife had filed the case under Torture and Custodial Death (Protection) Act, 2013; the investigation was handed over to Detective Branch. Officer in Charge of Mirpur Station Salahuddin Khan was also accused of being involved by Sujon's wife. Salahuddin Khan was killed in the July 2016 Dhaka attack by terrorists.
- In March 2014, Jisan, a 17-year-old student, of Dhaka City College was arrested by police from Dhanmondi Police Station. He was allegedly tortured by sub-inspector Sahidul Biswas, who demanded 1 million taka to end the torture. Jisan's father gave 0.4 million taka to plainclothes individuals inside the police station. Jisan had to be admitted to Dhaka Medical College Hospital for his injuries. Dhaka Metropolitan Police denied the allegations of torture.
- In January 2015, three teenagers were killed in police custody in Mirpur police station. The teenagers were handed over to police on accusation of attempted arson during Bangladesh Nationalist Party protests. Police claimed they died from mob beating. This was contradicted by evidence that the teenagers had 56 bullet injuries.
- On 7 April 2015, Uttara West Police station claimed that they tortured a suspect in custody following directives of senior police officers.
- In November 2016 Dhaka Metropolitan Police asked the Directorate General of Health Services not to release the detailed autopsy report of people killed in Crossfire with police to the press.
- On 3 December 2019, sub-inspector Mostafizur Rahman and 5 other police officers of Uttara west police station were sued at for allegedly extorting a banker of Sonali Bank.
- On 16 January 2014, Tapan Chandra Saha, officer in charge of Uttara west police station was sued for the death of man in custody at the Dhaka Metropolitan Sessions Judge's Court. The deceased's wife alleged that her husband was tortured in custody and she paid 50 thousand taka in bribes. On 24 January 2020, the court ordered Detective Branch to investigate on the incident.
- In 2020, police commissioner Shafiqul Islam removed a loyalist officer of Inspector General of Bangladesh Police Benazir Ahmed after publicly accusing him of corruption.

== Police commissioners ==
| No. | Name | Took office | Left office | Time in office | Ref. | | | |
|---|---|---|---|---|---|---|---|---|
| 1 | E. A. Chowdhury | 1 February 1976 | 24 December 1976 | 327 days | | | | |
| 2 | A. M. M. Aminur Rahman | 28 December 1976 | 2 February 1979 | 2 years, 36 days | | | | |
| 3 | Abdur Rakib Khandaker | 2 February 1979 | 8 February 1982 | 3 years, 6 days | | | | |
| 4 | Muhammad Habibur Rahman | 2 July 1982 | 2 August 1982 | 31 days | | | | |
| 5 | M. Azizul Haq | 2 August 1982 | 10 March 1983 | 220 days | | | | |
| 6 | Abdur Rakib Khandaker | 10 March 1983 | 4 April 1984 | 1 year, 25 days | | | | |
| 7 | A. H. M. B. Zaman | 4 April 1984 | 22 April 1987 | 3 years, 18 days | | | | |
| 8 | A. M. M. Nasrullah Khan | 22 April 1987 | 8 April 1990 | 2 years, 351 days | | | | |
| 9 | Mohammad Salam | 8 April 1990 | 26 August 1990 | 140 days | | | | |
| 10 | M. Enamul Haque | 26 August 1990 | 19 September 1990 | 24 days | | | | |
| 11 | Golam Morshed | 19 November 1990 | 2 January 1991 | 44 days | | | | |
| 12 | A. S. M. Shahjahan | 2 January 1991 | 16 October 1991 | 287 days | | | | |
| 13 | Mohammad Salam | 17 October 1991 | 12 December 1991 | 56 days | | | | |
| 14 | Md. Ashraful Huda | 12 December 1991 | 3 April 1992 | 113 days | | | | |
| 15 | Mirza Rakibul Huda | 4 April 1992 | 21 March 1993 | 351 days | | | | |
| 16 | A. N. Hussain | 21 March 1993 | 24 April 1996 | 3 years, 34 days | | | | |
| 17 | Mohammad Salam | 24 April 1996 | 17 October 1996 | 176 days | | | | |
| 18 | A. K. Al Mamun | 17 October 1996 | 17 November 1997 | 1 year, 31 days | | | | |
| 19 | A. F. M. Mahmoud-Al Farid | 17 November 1997 | 15 November 1998 | 363 days | | | | |
| 20 | A. K. M. Shamsuddin | 15 November 1998 | 18 January 2000 | 1 year, 64 days | | | | |
| 21 | Md. Matiur Rahman | 18 January 2000 | 3 August 2001 | 1 year, 197 days | | | | |
| 22 | Qutbur Rahman | 3 August 2001 | 26 August 2001 | 23 days | | | | |
| 23 | Md. Anwarul Iqbal | 26 August 2001 | 11 November 2001 | 77 days | | | | |
| 24 | Md. Abdul Qayyum | 11 November 2001 | 20 May 2003 | 1 year, 190 days | | | | |
| 25 | Md. Ashraful Huda | 20 May 2003 | 15 December 2004 | 1 year, 209 days | | | | |
| 26 | SM Mizanur Rahman | 15 December 2004 | 2 November 2006 | 1 year, 322 days | | | | |
| 27 | Naeem Ahmed | 2 November 2006 | 3 November 2006 | 1 day | | | | |
| 28 | ABM Bazlur Rahman | 3 November 2006 | 30 January 2007 | 88 days | | | | |
| 29 | Naeem Ahmed | 30 January 2007 | 15 March 2009 | 2 years, 44 days | | | | |
| 30 | A. K. M. Shahidul Haque | 18 March 2009 | 14 October 2010 | 1 year, 210 days | | | | |
| 31 | Benazir Ahmed | 14 October 2010 | 8 January 2015 | 4 years, 86 days | | | | |
| 32 | Asaduzzaman Mia | 8 January 2015 | 13 September 2019 | 4 years, 248 days | | | | |
| 33 | Shafiqul Islam | 13 September 2019 | 29 October 2022 | 3 years, 46 days | | | | |
| 34 | Khandker Golam Faruq | 29 October 2022 | 30 September 2023 | 336 days | | | | |
| 35 | Habibur Rahman | 30 September 2023 | 6 August 2024 | 311 days | | | | |
| 36 | Md. Mainul Hasan | 8 August 2024 | 20 November 2024 | 104 days | | | | |
| 37 | S. M. Sazzat Ali | 20 November 2024 | 25 February 2026 | 1 year, 97 days | | | | |
| 38 | Md. Sarwar | 25 February 2026 | 15 May 2026 | 262 days | | 39 | Mosleh Uddin Ahmed | 18 May 2026 |
