= Timeline of the International Crimes Tribunal (Bangladesh) =

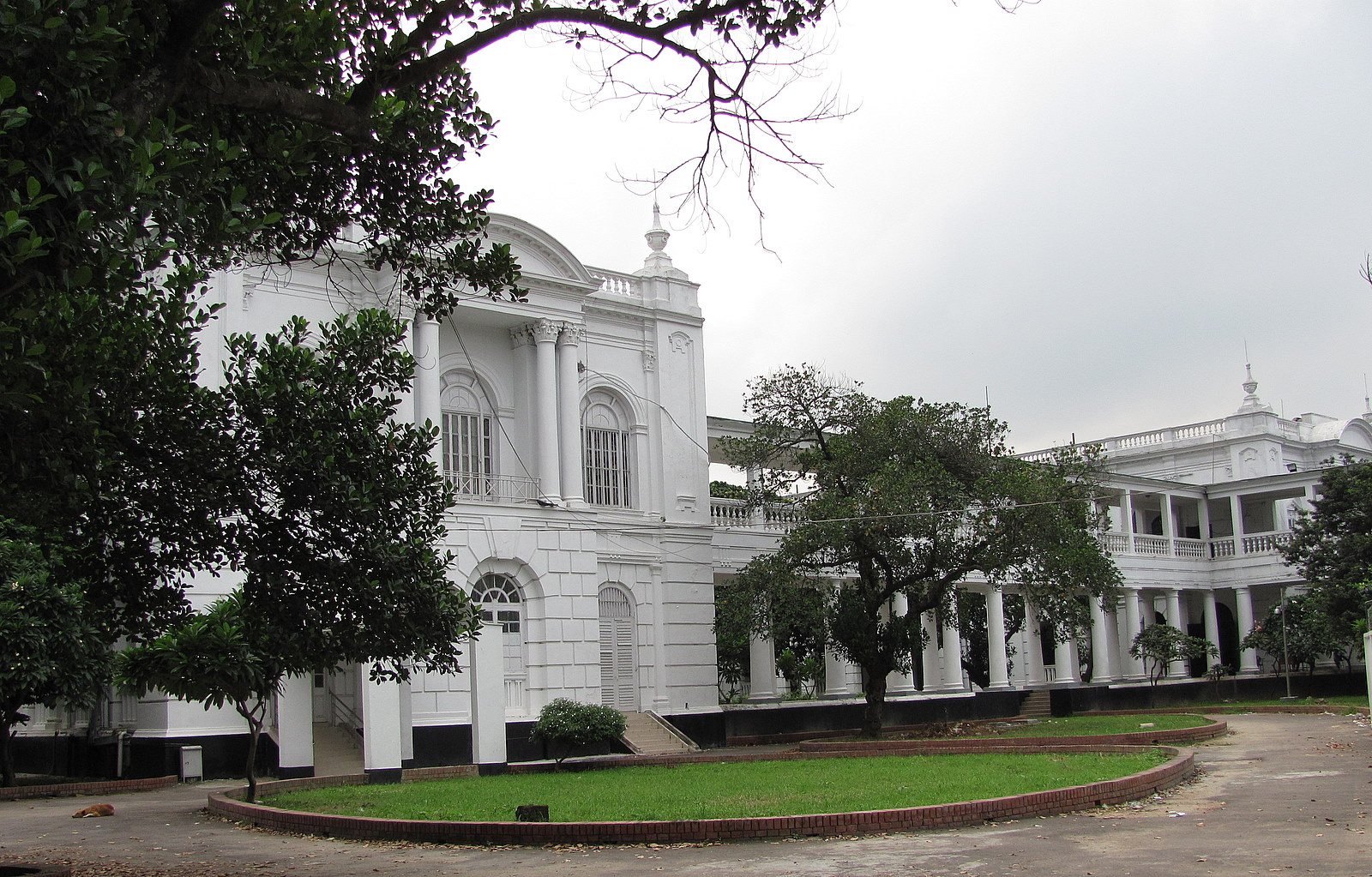
The trial of Bangladesh International Crimes Tribunal has been held in the old High Court building.

The International Crimes Tribunal (ICT) is an ongoing tribunal in Bangladesh that aims to investigate and administer justice regarding the war crimes, crimes against humanity, genocide and crimes against peace committed by Pakistan army and their local collaborators Razakar, Al-Badr, Al-Shams during the Bangladesh Liberation War of 1971. In 2008's public election, one of the principal electoral manifestos of the Awami League was to initiate the trial process of war criminals. As promised, a member of parliament from Awami League submitted the proposal of the trial of war criminals on 29 January 2009 in National Parliament and the proposal was accepted unanimously. Thirty-nine years after the start of the Bangladesh Liberation War, on 25 March 2010, the tribunal, attorney panel and investigation organization were formed for the trial of the ones accused of war crimes.

The timeline of this tribunal has been enumerated in this article.

== 2009 ==
=== January ===
29.	Mahmudus Samad Chowdhury, a member of parliament of Awami League from Sylhet-3 constituency raised the proposal of war criminals' trial in the National Parliament. The proposal was supported by the senior parliament members including the Prime Minister and thereafter the speaker asked for verbal votes asking whether to approve the proposal. The proposal was unanimously approved.

=== March ===
25.	The government of Bangladesh took the decision to investigate and put the accused on trial according to the International Crimes Law 1973.

=== May ===
21.	Government sent the Tribunal Act to the Commission of Law asking for expert opinions. Based on the opinions of Expert lawyers, judges, professors of various universities and some other experts on law of the country, later the Commission of Law recommended that the government amend certain points in the tribunal created in 1973.

=== July ===
9.	Considering the recommendations of the Commission of Law, some amendments were done by verbal votes.

== 2010 ==
=== March ===
25.	International Crimes Tribunal, Judge's panel and investigation agency is formed.

=== July ===
26.	The tribunal starts its official journey by the first hearing. Justice A T M Fazle Kabir and Justice A K M Zahir Ahmed, led by Justice Md. Nizamul Huq, the chairman of the tribunal directed the hearing of International Crimes Court in the old high court building at Dhaka. After the hearing, arrest warrants were issued for four leaders of Jamaat-e-Islami – Motiur Rahman Nizami, Ali Ahsan Mohammad Mojaheed, Muhammaad Kamaruzzaman and Abdul Quader Mollah for crimes against humanity in 1971.
29.	The three-membered bench led by tribunal chairman Nizamul Huq ordered Nizami, Mujahid, Kamaruzzaman and Qader Mollah to appear in front of the Tribunal on 2 August Monday.

=== August ===
2.
Accused Nizami, Mujahid, Kamaruzzaman and Mollah was brought to the tribunal from Dhaka Central Jail. Taking their attendance the court ordered to keep them in jail before further order.
4.
The public prosecutor requested the court to take actions to arrest the accused Delwar Hossain Sayeedi after the hearing. Court was informed that the accused person was in jail for another crime. Court ordered the jail authority to present the accused on 10 August.
10.
Sayeedi's prosecutors informed court that he could not appear at the court due to illness. The Tribunal announced amended order to present Sayeedi on 24 August.
16.
Abdul Quader Mollah and Muhammaad Kamaruzzaman, two imprisoned leaders of Jamaat filed a writ as complainant application at High Court challenging the legitimacy of the first amendment of constitution consisting of the war criminals' trial. In the writ, they claimed seven sections and sub-sections of International Crimes Tribunal Act enacted in 1973 to be against constitution and challenged the legitimacy of the arrest warrant for four Jammat leaders. Secretary of Law, Secretary of Home Ministry and Chairman of International Crimes Tribunal have been placed as defendants in the application. 17 August 2010 was fixed as the hearing date at the High Court Division Bench consisting of Justice Mohammad Abdul Wahab Miya and Justice Kazi Rezaul Huq.
17.
The hearing of the writ on the first amendment of constitution and legitimacy of few sections of International Crimes Tribunal of 1973 starts at High Court bench.
22.
Justice Abdul Wahab Miya stated his opinion after the hearing. He said that he had investigated all sections and sub-sections of International Tribunal Act and the only problem he found with the act was "The suspecced persons cannot go to apeal department, but they might go if they were convicted." He requested Attorney General Mahbub Alam to take actions on this matter on 23 August.
23.
Before any kind of hearing from the Government as the court's session begins in the morning, the prosecutor of defendants Barrister Abdur Razzak withdraws the writ request of 16 August. On that note, High Court dismisses the writ request for the first amendment of constitution and cancellation of few sections of International Crimes Tribunal, stating that the request has not been pressed. Point to be noted, the writ request was not rejected, but was withdrawn since it was not pressed. Therefore, requesting for the same writ in other courts remains possible. The request done by Abdul Wahab Mia on the previous day was not raised on the hearing.

In the morning, the investigation team of Tribunal starts the investigation on the charges against Ghulam Azam, former Amir of Jamaat for crimes against humanity in Bharmanbaria. They have done investigating the charges of killing the sub-inspector Shiru Mia and his son at Brahmanbaria in 1971. On the first day of investigation, the investigation team visited old and new jail of Brahmanbaria, the mass graveyard near Kurulia Bridge, Bodhdhobhumi of Portola. Later that afternoon, they collected evidences from some witnesses.

24.
The Tribunal files 21 September as the new date to present Delwar Hossain Sayeedi, Nayeb-e Amir of Jamaat-e-Islami for the case of crimes against humanity in 1971. According to court's decision, the hearing of the writ applications of Amir of Jamaat-e-Islami Motiur Rahman Nizami, Secretary General Ali Ahsan Mohammad Mojaheed, Deputy Secretary General Muhammaad Kamaruzzaman and Abdul Quader Mollah was decided to take place on the same day.

=== September ===
21.
22.
Sayeedi was brought to the tribunal from Dhaka Central Jail for the hearing। The hearing was led by Justice Md. Nizamul Huq, ATM Fazle Kabir and AKM Zahir Ahmed. Since the request to issue arrest warrant for Sayeedi was not properly presented on behalf of state, Sayeedi was sent back to jail instead of issuing arrest warrant. The tribunal fixed the next date for hearing as 22 September according to that request. On the same day, court rejected four petitions filed by lawyers of already arrested Jamaat leaders Mujahid, Kamaruzzaman, Qader Mollah along with Nizam, the Amir of Jamaat. The petitions were- withdrawing the arrest warrants issued for the imprisoned ones, their release, withholding the activities of tribunal and withholding next activities until the certified copies of the cases were provided. Two more petitions were withdrawn by the lawyers of Jamaat leaders. এই দিন আদালতে কঠোর নিরাপত্তার ব্যবস্থা করা হয়।
On the afternoon of 21 September, jail authority informed the court that Sayeedi could not be presented at Tribunal due to his sudden illness.

In spite of Sayeedi's absence, the three member tribunal led by Justice Nizamul Huq announced 12 October as the next date of hearing. The jail authority informed that Sayeedi could not be presented at court on 22 September due to falling ill on the 21st. Public prosecutor Syed Hyder Ali submitted a supplementary report for issuing arrest warrant for Sayeedi at the beginning of court session.

=== October ===
12.	Sayeedi was not presented at Tribunal on the previously fixed date of 12 October due to his illness. During the hearing, the tribunal fixed the next date of hearing to be on 2 November in Sayeedi's absence. This was the third time to delay Sayeedi's appearance at court due to illness. Sayeedi was ordered to appear on 2 November in ambulance if needed.

=== November ===
2.	The three member tribunal led by Justice Nizamul Huq ordered to keep Sayeedi in confinement till 29 December. Besides, the tribunal ordered the investigation agency to prepare a charge-sheet or submit the investigation report against Sayeedi. Syed Haider Ali, the public prosecutor requested the court to keep the arrest warrant in force stating that primary evidences of Sayeedi's involvement in crimes against humanity had been found, therefore he needed to be kept under arrest for the sake of investigation. Tajul Islam, Sayeedi's lawyer opposed the request. The court issued the above order at the end of hearing.

=== December ===
19.	The hearing of tribunal took place regarding the request to arrest Salahuddin Quader Chowdhury for war crimes. Tribunal lawyers had placed the request on 15 December. At the end of hearing, three lawyers of the tribunal led by Nizamul Huq issued the order to present Chowdhury at tribunal on 30 December showing him arrested as accused for war crimes.

== 2011 ==
=== January ===
17.	The court ordered to keep Salahuddin Quader Chowdhury detained until 19 April, charged for crimes against humanity. Three of the four requests placed in favor of Chowdhuty was rejected and one was executed. Tribunal ordered the investigation team to provide a thorough report about Choudhury's involvement in crimes against humanity as soon as possible.

=== February ===
20.	The investigation report on charges of Sayeedi's crimes against humanity was submitted by war crimes investigating agency as per tribunal's order. At the end of the hearing, the tribunal issued an order to keep Sayeedi in confinement till 15 March and to present him at court on the same date. Besides, tribunal ordered the investigation agency to present 'Case Diary' against Sayeedi on 15 March.

=== March ===
15.	Sayeedi's bail was rejected. Apart from Sayeedi, four jamaat-e-Islami leaders Nizami, Mujahid, Kamaruzzaman and Qader Mollah arrested for the same changes as Sayeedi's were ordered to appear at the tribunal on 20 April.

=== October ===
3.	Tribunal framed 20 charges against Delwar Hossain Sayeedi for crimes against humanity and genocide in 1971.

== 2012 ==
=== March ===
22.	Government formed a new International Crimes Tribunal (Tribunal-2 or ICT-2) to speed up the trial procedure.
25.	Tribunal-2 started working being led by the former Justice of Tribunal-1, A T M Fazle Kabir.

=== April ===
3.	Tribunal-2 ordered to arrest and present Abul Kalam Azad, the former Rukn of Jamaat to court within 24 hours. But he fled from home that morning and the Detective Policeforce could not find him.
4.	Tribunal-1 framed 23 charges of crimes against humanity against Salahuddin Quader Chowdhury
5.	Amending some rules of Tribunal-1, Tribunal-2 created their own activity rules. According to new rules, any orders by Tribunal cannot be reviewed more than once.
8.	Helaluddin, an officer at charge investigation agency, gave evidence against Sayeedi at court. Point to be noted, evidences have been collected from 27 people in this case so far.
