= Abdul Aziz Sarkar =

Bangladeshi police officer

Abdul Aziz Sarkar was a Bangladeshi police officer who served as the Director General of Rapid Action Battalion.

== Career ==
Sarkar served in the United Nation mission to the former Yugoslavia. He was appointed the Director General of Rapid Action battalion on 24 April 2005, he replaced Anwarul Iqbal the first Director General of RAB. He served as the Director General of Rapid Action Battalion till 30 October 2006. He served during the 15 August 2004 Grenade attack on Sheikh Hasina. He led RAB into arresting Mufti Hannan. Home Minister Lutfozzaman Babar expressed dissatisfaction over the arrest and asked him not investigate the issue further. He along with Colonel Gulzar Uddin Ahmed interrogated Mufti Hanan in the Taskforce for Interrogation Cell. Sarkar said due to his term being over he could not take any more action over the issue.

Sarkar oversaw the arrest of Shaykh Abdur Rahman head of the terrorist organisation Jamaat-ul-Mujahideen Bangladesh. On 7 June 2005 he was accused in a case filed by Amela Khatun the mother of Jubo League activist Sumon. Sumon was part of a Bangladesh Awami League protest after the Bangladesh Nationalist Party government reduced a loop from the Khilgaon flyover. He was arrested by RAB and killed in custody. After the caretaker government took over in 2006 the contracts of both Sarkar and Forrukh Ahmed, chief of Special Branch, were terminated.
