= Saiful Islam Joarder =

Bangladeshi military personnel

- Spouse: Lubna Ahmed
- Children: 2
- Military career
- Allegiance: Bangladesh
- Branch: Bangladesh Army
- Service years: 1986-2004
- Rank: Lieutenant Colonel
- Unit: East Bengal Regiment
- Commands: CO of 24th East Bengal Regiment; GSO-1 of CTIB
- Known for: 2004 Dhaka grenade attack

Saiful Islam Joarder is a former Bangladeshi Army officer who later became a fugitive due to his involvement for help to escape Tajuddin, the prime suspect of 2004 Dhaka grenade attack. He is believed to be in Bangladesh.

== Career ==
Joarder was a lieutenant colonel who worked in Directorate General of Forces Intelligence, military intelligence of Bangladesh. After the 2004 Dhaka grenade attack, he helped one of the key suspects flee to Pakistan from Bangladesh. His brother in law, Saiful Islam Duke, is one of the accused in 2004 Dhaka grenade attack. Duke is the nephew of former Prime Minister Khaleda Zia.

He was involved in the November 2009 grenade attack on Fazle Noor Taposh, member of parliament and relative of Prime Minister Sheikh Hasina. He went on the run after the grenade attack.
