= 2004 Dhaka grenade attack =

Terrorist attack in Dhaka, Bangladesh

Dhaka grenade attack
- Location: Shaheed Abrar Fahad Avenue (Formerly Bangabandhu Avenue), Paltan, Dhaka, Bangladesh
- Date: 21 August 2004; 17:21 (UTC+06:00)
- Target: Sheikh Hasina and Awami League rally in response to 2004 Shah Jalal bombing
- Attack type: Grenade
- Deaths: 24 (including Ivy Rahman)
- Injuries: Over 500
- Perpetrators: Harkat-ul-Jihad al-Islami (alleged); Bangladesh Nationalist Party (alleged)

The 2004 Dhaka grenade attack took place at an anti-terrorism rally organised by Awami League on Bangabandhu Avenue (now Shaheed Abrar Fahad Avenue) on 21 August 2004. The attack left 24 dead and more than 500 injured. The attack was carried out at 5:22 PM after Sheikh Hasina, the then leader of the opposition had finished addressing a crowd of 20,000 people from the back of a truck used as the stage. Hasina also sustained some injuries in the attack.

== Events and casualties ==
Awami League chief Sheikh Hasina had been speaking at a public meeting in Bangabandhu Avenue, protesting against blasts against terrorist grenade attack on the British High Commissioner to Bangladesh, Anwar Choudhury in Sylhet. The rally drew a crowd of 20,000 people. As Hasina finished her speech, a total of 13 grenades were thrown into the crowd from the rooftops of nearby buildings, killing at least 16 people on the spot. Later the death toll reached 24. The blast left more than 500 injured. Among the dead were Hasina's bodyguard, Mahbubur Rahman, and Awami League Women's Affairs Secretary Ivy Rahman, who died from her injuries three days later.

== Reaction ==
The Awami League called for a nationwide hartal on 23 and 24 August 2004 following the incident. Khaleda Zia, the Prime Minister of Bangladesh, condemned the attacks and also vowed a thorough probe to catch the culprits. An intercity train was burned down by Awami League activists on strike in Bhairab. Awami League activists also organized protests in Chittagong and furled black flags at the sight of the attack. A funeral service for the victims at Baitul Mukarram National Mosque was attended by 20 thousand people. Protestors in Dhaka were attacked by members of Bangladesh Police and Jatiyatabadi Sramik Dal, the workers wing of the Bangladesh Nationalist Party (BNP). The Jatiyatabadi Sramik Dal activists also attacked and injured six members of the press.

President of the United States, George W. Bush, expressed "shock" at the attack and conveyed his message to Prime Minister Khaleda Zia and opposition leader Sheikh Hasina through the Secretary of State of the United States, Colin Powell. The attack was also condemned by the United Kingdom, Netherlands, Denmark, France, Germany, Italy, and Sweden.

== Investigation ==
=== Initial investigation ===
Bangladesh Police refused to register any criminal case filed by Bangladesh Awami League over the attack and only registered a general diary. The BNP-led government initially refused to hand over the bodies of the victims, according to Hasina. Investigators from the Federal Bureau of Investigation (FBI) and Interpol made repeated visits to Bangladesh to provide technical support. The Government also tried to implicate Mokhlesur Rahman, an Awami League activist, and Shaibal Saha Partha. They were arrested by Bangladesh Police. Shaibal Saha Partha and Joj Miah were tortured in custody and forced to give a false confessional statement. An investigation by the Supreme Court Bar Association accused the government of destroying evidence. The government was also criticised for hurriedly burying two unidentified dead bodies from the terror attack in the middle of the night.

In 2004, the 4-Party Alliance's coalition government assigned the Crime Investigation Department of the police to oversee the investigation. They came up with a story that some Joj Miah, also known as Jamal Ahmed from Noakhali district, along with 14 other criminals of the Seven Star terrorist group of Subrata Bain, attacked the Awami League rally. They met at Moghbazar before the attack, and rehearsed at a remote island before the attack. The government of Bangladesh formed a one-man judicial probe led by Justice Joynul Abedin. The Awami League rejected the commission, which blamed the attack on a neighboring country. The Daily Star described Abedin as a "shame" for the judiciary in Bangladesh.

On 26 June 2005, Joj Mia, a petty criminal, confessed his involvement in the crime under section 164, to the magistrate. The story collapsed following investigative journalism that discovered holes in the official story.

=== 2007–2008 investigation ===
In 2007, after the military-backed government assumed office, many of the BNP and Awami League leaders were rounded up by the government agencies, and a fresh investigation into the case was launched.

After almost one year, in November 2007, Mufti Hannan, a militant leader from Gopalganj who was arrested by the BNP-led government in 2005, revealed that the attack was operated by the militant outfit Harkat-ul-Jihad-al-Islami, of which he was a leader. He also admitted that he got support from Maulana Tazuddin, brother of BNP leader and former deputy minister Abdus Salam Pintu, while coordinating the attack.

According to his statement, Abdus Salam Pintu had knowledge of the attack.

In 2008, after the detailed investigation, the then CID high official Mohammad Javed Patwary concluded that the attack was aimed at killing Sheikh Hasina and was guided by the common grievance of both Mufti Hannan and Abdus Salam Pintu against Sheikh Hasina for her role in "subduing" Islam. The investigation report mentioned that Abdus Salam Pintu was personally responsible for the attack.

=== Further investigation ===
In 2009, the Awami League came to office and decided to launch a further investigation into the incident and appointed a retired CID official, Abdul Kahar Akhand, as the person in charge.

In the same year, Abdul Majed Bhat, alias Yusuf Bhat, gave a confessional statement with the details regarding the source of grenades used in the attack. He claimed that Muzaffar Ahmad Shah of Tehrik-e-Jihad Islami (TEJI) gave the grenades to Maulana Tajuddin to send those to Indian militant groups. Tajuddin, instead of sending those to India, kept those with him. According to Yusuf Bhat, these grenades were later handed over to Mufti Hannan to carry out the attack.

After two years, in 2011, Mufti Hannan gave another confessional statement implicating many big names, mostly BNP leaders and some former officials of the government including the son of opposition leader and former prime minister Khaleda Zia, Tarique Rahman, former deputy minister Abdus Salam Pintu, former member of parliament Kazi Shah Mofazzal Hossain Kaikobad and some officials of the Home Ministry, police, Directorate General of Forces Intelligence (DGFI), National Security Intelligence (NSI) and Prime Minister's Office (PMO) with involvement in the planning of the bombing.

In the statement, Mufti Hannan claimed that the attack was aimed at destroying the top leadership of Awami League, including Sheikh Hasina, and BNP leader Tarique Rahman, along with Jamaat leader Ali Ahsan Mohammad Mujahid and the Home Minister Lutfozzaman Babar assured them of government support.

== Perpetrators ==
Harkat-ul-Jihad-al-Islami (HUJI) leader Mufti Abdul Hannan was arrested on 30 September 2005 for the grenade attacks, and was later charged in connection with it. He reportedly confessed to the attacks in November 2007. He was sentenced to death in December 2008 for attempting to kill Anwar Choudhury in 2004. In March 2012, the son of opposition leader and former prime minister Khaleda Zia, Tarique Rahman, and 28 others were tried in absentia for their alleged involvement in the attack. The supplementary charge sheets charges HuJI, influential leaders of the BNP and Jamaat-e-Islami Bangladesh, including former deputy minister Abdus Salam Pintu, former member of parliament Kazi Shah Mofazzal Hossain Kaikobad and some officials of the Home Ministry, police, DGFI, NSI and PMO with involvement in the planning of the bombing.

Jamal Ahmed, also known as Joj Mia, was coerced into giving a false confession. He was forced to implicate Seven-Star Group, led by Subrata Bain, through torture by security forces during BNP rule.

== Charges and punishments ==
On 10 October 2018, a special court, Speedy Trial Tribunal-1, delivered verdicts in relevant cases and accused 49 people. It ruled the grenade attack "was a well-orchestrated plan, executed through abuse of state power". Judge Shahed Nuruddin said, "The specialised deadly Arges grenades that are used in wars were blasted at the Awami League's central office on 23 Bangabandhu Avenue in broad daylight with the help of the then state machinery". On charges of killing through common intention, planning, and criminal conspiracy, 38 persons were found guilty. Nineteen were sentenced to death:

1. Lutfozzaman Babar
2. Abdus Salam Pintu
3. Rezzakul Haider Chowdhury
4. General Abdur Rahim
5. Maulana Md Tajuddin
6. Md Hanif
7. Maulana Sheikh Abdus Salam
8. Md Abdul Mazed Bhat (alias Md Yousuf Bhat)
9. Abdul Malek (alias Golam Mohammad and GM)
10. Maulana Shawkat Hossain (alias Sheikh Farid)
11. Mahibullah (alias Mafijur Rahman and Ovi)
12. Maulana Abu Sayeed (alias Jafar)
13. Abul Kalam Azad (alias Bulbul)
14. Md Jahangir Alam
15. Hafiz Maulana Abu Taher
16. Hossain Ahmed Tamim
17. Main Uddin Sheikh (alias Mufti Main, Khajwa, Abu Jandal, and Masum Billah)
18. Md Rafiqul Iqbal Islam (alias Sabuj, Khalid Saifullah, Shamim and Rashed)
19. Md Ujjal (alias Ratan)

On the same charges, 19 others were given life in prison sentences, including Tarique Rahman, Harris Chowdhury, and Kazi Shah Mofazzal Hossain Kaikobad.

All 38 were also found guilty of grievously injuring victims through common intention, planning, and criminal conspiracy and sentenced to jail for 20 years.

On the charge for harbouring the offenders, former Inspectors General of Police Ashraful Huda and Shahudul Haque were sentenced to two years in jail. For the charges of harbouring and protecting the offenders, Saiful Islam Duke, Saiful Islam Joarder, and ATM Amin were given four years in jail. For the charge of misleading the investigation and making the "Joj Mia" story, IGP Khoda Baksh Chowdhury, SP of CID Ruhul Amin, ASPs of CID Abdur Rashid and Munshi Atikur Rahman were sentenced to two years in prison.

A total of 18 convicts were at large at the time of the verdict.

On 1 December 2024, all accused were acquitted by the high court in this case.

== Appeal and verdict ==
On 22 November 2024, the High Court concluded a hearing on the appeals and death references of the grenade attack cases. On 1 December 2024, Tarique Rahman, Lutfozzaman Babar, Abdus Salam Pintu and all other accused was acquitted by court.

== Controversies and divergent views ==
=== Awami League's allegations of state sponsorship by the BNP-Jamaat alliance ===
The Awami League has consistently maintained that the grenade attack on their rally in 2004 was sponsored by the then-incumbent BNP-Jamaat coalition government. They have emphatically argued that the sheer scale and coordination of the operation point to the complicity of the state machinery, particularly intelligence agencies loyal to the BNP. The target of the attack, then-Opposition Leader Sheikh Hasina, has asserted in numerous public addresses that such an assault would have been impossible without direct governmental cooperation; she has cited the involvement of high-ranking political figures in both the planning and execution phases. Sheikh Hasina has specifically accused the BNP-Jamaat administration of providing logistical support and security cover for the perpetrators. Reasoning on 21 August 2020, she stated, "An attack like that of August 21, 2004, would not have been possible without the direct patronage of the then BNP-Jamaat government." Reiterating similar claims in 2023, she remarked that there was "no doubt" that BNP Chairperson Khaleda Zia and her son, Tarique Rahman, along with their associates, had orchestrated this conspiracy from Hawa Bhaban, the building known as the nerve center of the BNP's operations.

To substantiate their claims, the party points to issues such as the prolonged delay in apprehending suspects during the BNP's tenure and the initial official narratives, which appeared designed to deflect blame as evidence of complicity and obstruction of justice. In annual events commemorating the victims, the Awami League portrays the attack as a state-backed assassination attempt aimed at annihilating the opposition leadership. It was on the basis of these allegations that investigations and judicial proceedings were conducted under the post-2008 Awami League-led government, resulting in various sentences, including life imprisonment, for several BNP leaders in 2018 on charges of patronage. However, following the ouster of the Awami League, a verdict delivered by a reconstituted High Court in December 2024 acquitted 49 individuals, including prominent BNP leaders.

=== BNP's rebuttal and allegations of political fabrication ===
The BNP remains steadfast in its position that it played no role in the planning of the grenade attack on Sheikh Hasina's rally on 21 August 2004; they have dismissed allegations of patronage or involvement as baseless attempts by the Awami League to malign the opposition. BNP leaders, including the party's Acting Chairman Tarique Rahman, contend that these charges were born out of political vendetta rather than credible evidence. Simultaneously, the party alleges that the Awami League-led government manipulated the investigative and judicial processes to consolidate power prior to elections.

The 2018 lower court verdict had sentenced 19 individuals to death and handed a life term to Tarique Rahman. The BNP characterized this verdict as the product of coerced confessions secured under the Awami League's influence, as well as procedural flaws, including bias in witness selection and the disregarding of forensic discrepancies. On 4 September 2025, the Appellate Division of the Supreme Court dismissed a petition for a retrial, thereby upholding the High Court's judgment of acquittal.

=== Questions regarding the integrity of evidence and militant involvement ===
Critics have raised significant concerns regarding the chain of custody and preservation of physical evidence from the 21 August 2004 attack, including allegations of the deliberate destruction of evidence during the initial police investigation. In 2017, a prosecution witness testified that evidence was intentionally destroyed during the probe, casting doubt on the reliability of forensic materials such as grenade fragments and residue samples. Such negligence in preservation indicates a failure in the 'chain of custody,' as no independent verification of the evidence flow was documented publicly, which was subsequently identified as a weakness in the evidentiary record during judicial review. The acquittal of all 49 defendants by the High Court in 2024, and its subsequent affirmation by the Supreme Court in September 2025, underscored a profound deficit in forensic criminal identification. The bench noted a lack of evidence establishing a link between the recovered explosives and the specific accused. In the absence of a forensic re-examination, the verdict leaves unresolved questions regarding the provenance and testing of the munitions, including whether the Arges grenades matched known militant stockpiles without any contamination or mismanagement.

Alternative analyses suggest a distinct role for Islamist militant groups in the attack. Organizations such as Harkat-ul-Jihad al-Islami Bangladesh (HuJI-B), known for their anti-secular activities, are suspected of involvement, as the coordinated nature of the grenade tossing aligns with their established modus operandi in several respects.
