= List of Bangla Academy Literary Award recipients (2010–2019) =

This is a list of the recipients of the Bangla Academy Literary Award from 2010 to 2019.

== 2010 ==
6 persons were awarded.

1. Rubi Rahman (poetry)
2. Nasir Ahmed (poetry)
3. Bulbul Chowdhury (folk literature)
4. Khan Sarwar Murshid (essay and research)
5. Ajoy Roy (science and technology)
6. Shahjahan Kibria (juvenile literature)

== 2011 ==
10 persons were awarded.

1. Ashim Saha (poetry)
2. Kamal Chowdhury (poetry)
3. Anisul Hoque (folk literature)
4. Abdullah Abu Sayeed (essay)
5. Biswajit Ghosh (research)
6. Khaliquzzaman Elias (translation)
7. Belal Muhammad (literature on liberation war affairs)
8. Baren Chakrabarti (travel story)
9. Ali Ajgar (science, technology and environment)
10. Akhtar Hossain (juvenile literature)

== 2012 ==
9 persons were awarded.

1. Sanaul Haque Khan (poetry)
2. Abid Anwar (poetry)
3. Harishanker Jaldas (folk literature)
4. Sanat Kumar Saha (essay)
5. Khondokar Sirajul Haque (research)
6. Fakrul Alam (translation)
7. Mahbub Alam (Liberation War-related writings)
8. Tapan Chakrabarty (science, technology and environment)
9. Mahbub Talukdar (juvenile literature)

== 2013 ==
11 persons were awarded.

1. Helal Hafiz (poetry)
2. Purabi Basu (folk literature)
3. Mofidul Hoque (essay)
4. Jamil Chowdhury (research)
5. Provangshu Tripura (research)
6. Kaiser Haq (translation)
7. Haroon Habib (Liberation War-related writings)
8. Mahfuzur Rahman (autobiography and travel story)
9. Shahidul Islam (science, technology and environment)
10. Kaiser Chowdhury (juvenile literature)
11. Aslam Sunny (juvenile literature)

== 2014 ==
7 persons were awarded.

1. Shihab Sarkar (poetry)
2. Zakir Talukder (fiction)
3. Shantanu Kaiser (essay)
4. Bhuiyan Iqbal (research)
5. Abu Mohammad Delwar Hossain (literature on liberation war)
6. Mainus Sultan (travel story)
7. Khaleque bin Zainuddin (juvenile literature)

== 2015 ==
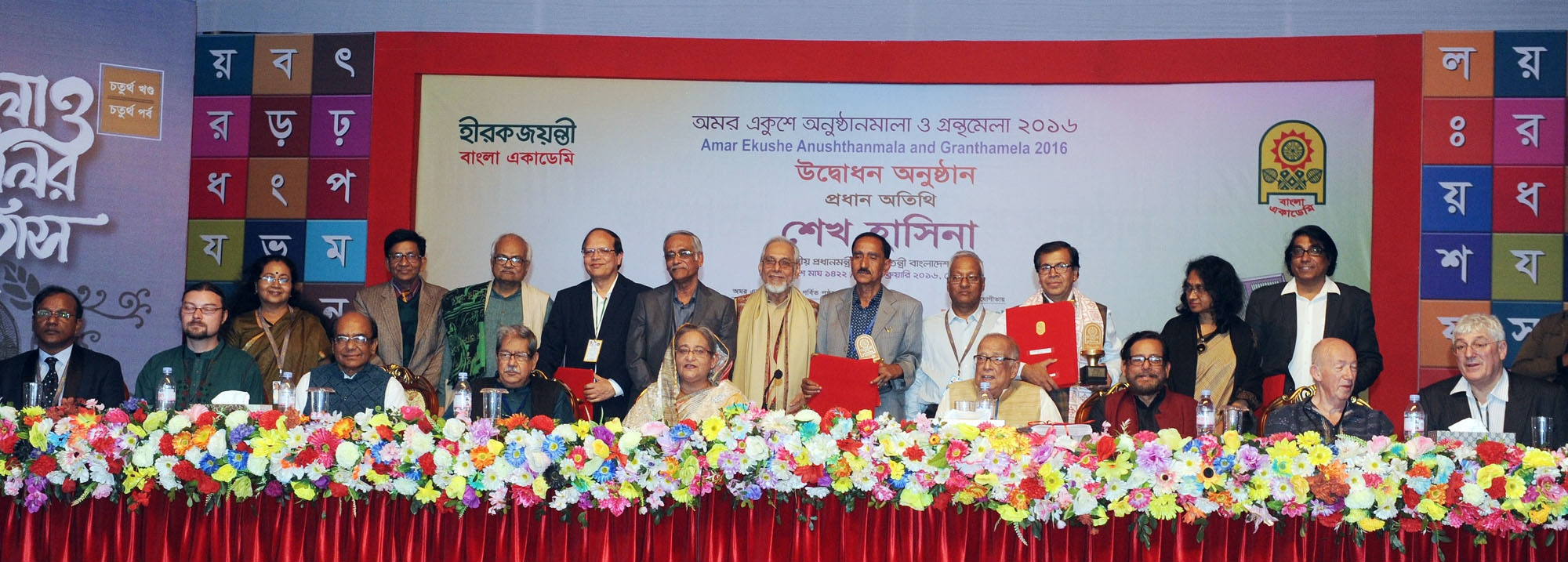
2015 winners

11 persons were awarded.

1. Altaf Hossain (poetry)
2. Shaheen Akhtar (fiction)
3. Abul Momen (essay)
4. Atiur Rahman (essay)
5. Maniruzzaman (research)
6. Abdus Selim (translation)
7. Tajul Mohammad (literature on liberation war)
8. Faruq Ahmed Choudhury (biography and travel story)
9. Masum Reza (drama)
10. Sharif Khan (science, technology and environment)
11. Sujan Barua (juvenile literature)

== 2016 ==
7 persons were awarded.

1. Abu Hasan Shahriar (poetry)
2. Shahaduz Zaman (fiction)
3. Morshed Shafiul Hasan (essay and research)
4. Niaz Zaman (translation)
5. MA Hasan (literature on the liberation war)
6. Noorjahan Bose (autobiography/memoir)
7. Rashed Rouf (juvenile literature)

== 2017 ==
12 persons were awarded.

1. Mohammad Sadik (poetry)
2. Maruful Islam (poetry)
3. Mamun Hossain (fiction)
4. Mahbubul Haque (essay)
5. Rafiqullah Khan (research)
6. Aminul Islam Bhuiyan (translation)
7. Kamrul Hasan Bhuiyan (literature on liberation war)
8. Surma Jahid (literature on liberation war)
9. Shakoor Majid (travelogue)
10. Malay Bhowmick (drama)
11. Moshtak Ahmed (science, technology and environment)
12. Jharna Dash Purokhayshto (juvenile literature)

== 2018 ==
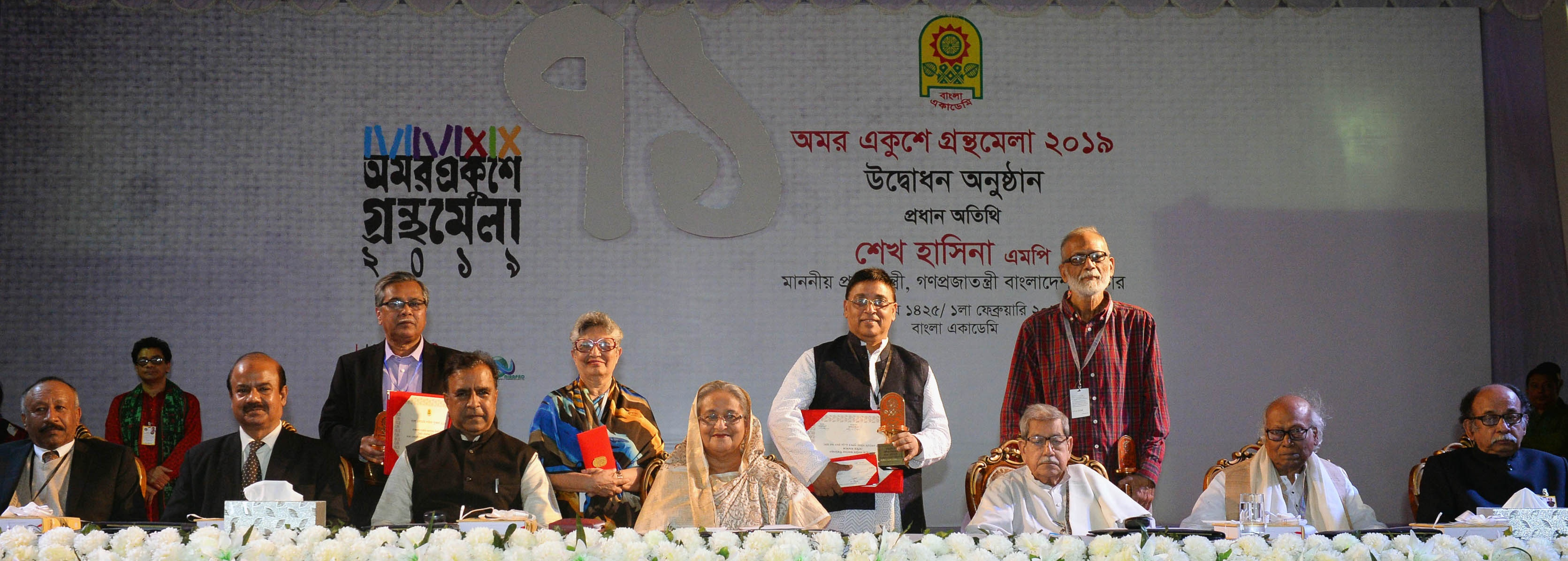
2018 winners

4 persons were awarded.

1. Afsan Chowdhury (literature on liberation war)
2. Quazi Rosy (poetry)
3. Mohit Kamal (fiction)
4. Syed Mohammad Shahed (essay and research)

== 2019 ==
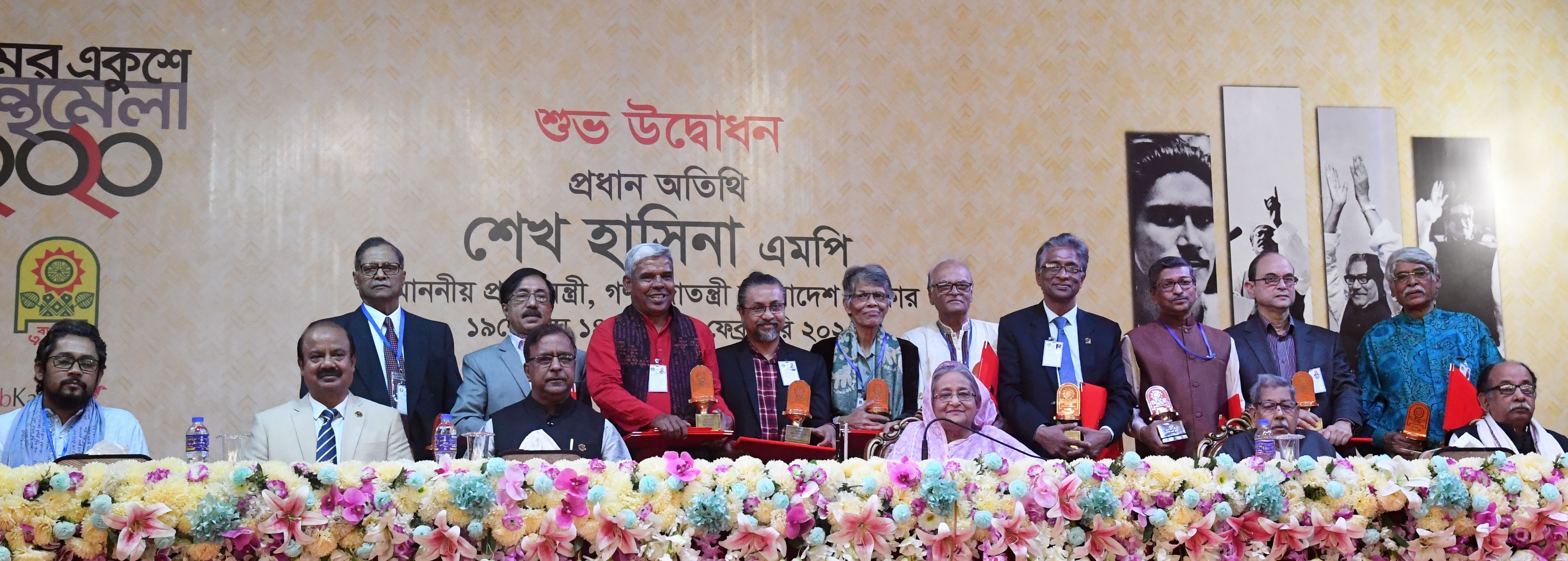
2019 winners

10 persons were awarded.

1. Rafiqul Islam (literature on liberation war)
2. Makid Haider (poetry)
3. Wasi Ahmed (literature)
4. Swarochish Sarkar (essay/research)
5. Khairul Alam Sabuj (translation)
6. Rahim Shah (children's literature)
7. Ratan Siddiqui (drama)
8. Nadira Majumder (science fiction)
9. Faruk Moinuddin (autobiography/travelogue)
10. Saymon Zakaria (folklore)
