= List of Ekushey Padak award recipients (2000–2009) =

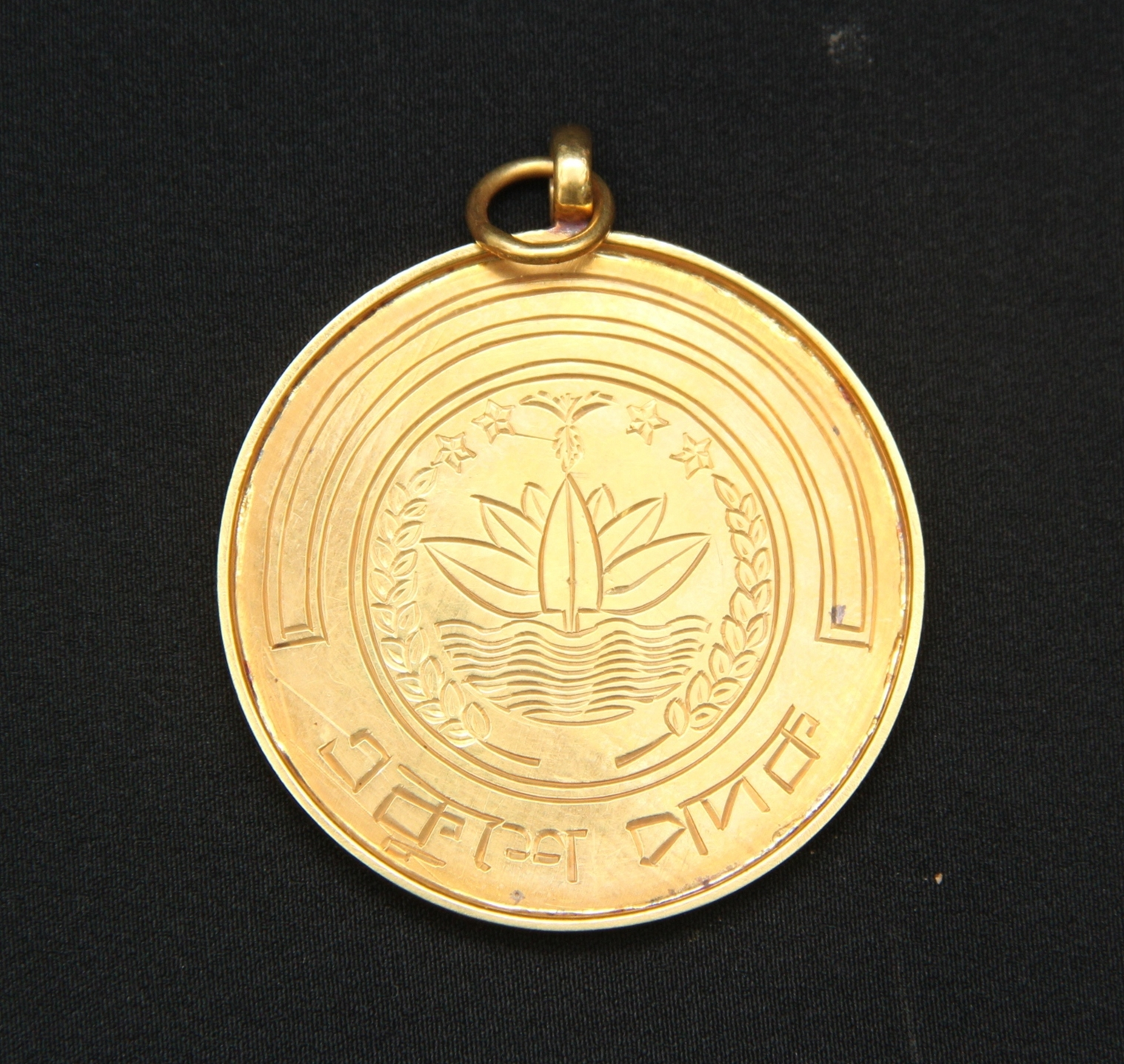
List of Ekushey Padak award recipients
- 1976–1979
- 1980–1989
- 1990–1999
- 2000–2009
- 2010–2019
- 2020–2029

== 2000 ==
In 2000, 15 people received the Ekushey Padak, two of them posthumously:

1. Ekhlas Uddin Ahmed, literature
2. Mohiuddin Ahmed, politics (posthumous)
3. Rafiq Uddin Ahmed, language martyr
4. Abul Barkat, language martyr
5. Syed Abdul Hadi, music
6. Gaziul Haque, Language Movement
7. Khalid Hossain, music
8. Nilima Ibrahim, education
9. Jamal Nazrul Islam, science and technology
10. Abdul Jabbar, language martyr
11. Abdullah Al Mamun, drama
12. Zahidur Rahim, music (posthumous)
13. Sofiur Rahman, language martyr
14. Abdus Salam, language martyr
15. Shamim Sikder, sculpture

== 2001 ==
In 2001, one organization and 11 people received the Ekushey Padak:

1. The Mother Language Lovers Of The World, for its contribution to the declaration of 21 February as International Mother Language Day
2. Foni Borua, music
3. Shyamoli Nasrin Chowdhury, education
4. Nirmalendu Goon, literature
5. Zia Haider, literature
6. Rafiqul Islam, education
7. Binoy Bashi Joldas, instrumental music
8. Shah Abdul Karim, folk song
9. Abdul Matin, Language Movement
10. Golam Mustafa, film
11. Ataur Rahman, drama
12. Mahadev Saha, literature

== 2002 ==
In 2002, 14 people received the Ekushey Padak, seven of them posthumously:

1. Sufia Ahmed, flourishing culture and Language Movement
2. Gazi Mazharul Anwar, music
3. Abul Kalam Azad, education (posthumously)
4. Abdul Hamid Khan Bhashani, Language Movement (posthumously)
5. Ahmed Sofa, literature (posthumously)
6. Monzur Hossain, Language Movement (posthumously)
7. Mohammad Sharif Hossain, education
8. Serajur Rahman, journalism
9. Abdur Jabbar Khan, film (posthumously)
10. Sadek Khan, Language Movement and film
11. Kazi Golam Mahbub, Language Movement
12. Pratibha Mutsuddi, education
13. Muhammad Shahidullah, literature and Language Movement (posthumously)
14. Ramesh Shil, Gano Sangeet (posthumously)

== 2003 ==
12 persons were awarded.

1. Muhammad Shamsul Huq
2. Muhammad Ekramul Huq
3. Zebunnessa Rahman
4. Zobeda Khanum
5. Abdul Mannan Syed
6. Al Mujahidi
7. Anjuman Ara Begum
8. Lokman Hossain Fakir
9. Khan Ataur Rahman
10. Abdul Hamid
11. Nazim Uddin Mostan
12. UNESCO

== 2004 ==
In 2004, 10 people received the Ekushey Padak, two of them posthumously.

1. Mohammad Moniruzzaman Miah (education)
2. Wakil Ahmed (research)
3. Farida Hossain (literature)
4. Nilufar Yasmin (music, posthumously)
5. Moniruzzaman Monir (music)
6. Mustafa Manwar (fine arts)
7. Nawab Faizunnesa (social service, posthumously)
8. Zobaida Hannan (social service)
9. A.Z.M. Enayetullah Khan (journalism)
10. Chashi Nazrul Islam (film)

== 2005 ==
14 persons received the award.

1. Saifur Rahman (language movement)
2. Khandaker Delwar Hossain (language movement)
3. Syed Mujtaba Ali (literature)
4. Abdullah Abu Sayeed (education)
5. Iqbal Mahmud (education)
6. Zubaida Gulshan Ara (literature)
7. Mohammad Abdul Gafur (language movement)
8. Abu Saleh (literature)
9. Ashab Uddin Ahmed (literature)
10. Chittaranjan Saha (education)
11. Mahasanghanayak Bishuddhananda Mahathero (social service)
12. Bashir Ahmed (music)
13. Apel Mahmood (music)
14. Md Mashir Hossain (journalism)

== 2006 ==
In 2006, 13 people received the Ekushey Padak, three of them posthumously:

1. Aftab Ahmed, photography
2. Jasimuddin Ahmed, education
3. M. Asaduzzaman, education
4. Sukomal Barua, education
5. Anwara Begum, education
6. Shahadat Chowdury, journalism (posthumous)
7. Nurul Islam, literature (posthumous)
8. Anwaruddin Khan, music (posthumous)
9. Gaziul Hasan Khan, journalism
10. Hamiduzzaman Khan, sculpture
11. Abul Kalam Monjur Morshed, literature
12. Rawshan Ara Mustafiz, music
13. Fatema Tuz Zohra, music

== 2007 ==
In 2007, five people received the Ekushey Padak, two of them posthumously.

1. M A Beg, photography (posthumous)
2. Selim Al Deen, drama
3. Mohammad Mahfuzullah, literature
4. Anwar Pervez, music (posthumous)
5. Muhammad Habibur Rahman, literature

== 2008 ==
In 2008, nine people received the Ekushey Padak, four of them posthumously.

1. Muzaffar Ahmed, education
2. Khandaker Nurul Alam, music
3. Shyam Sundar Baishnab, music (posthumous)
4. Najma Chowdhury, research
5. Shefali Ghosh, music (posthumous)
6. Waheedul Haq, music (posthumous)
7. Zohra Begum Kazi, social work (posthumous)
8. Dilwar Khan, literature
9. Khaleque Nawaz Khan, language

== 2009 ==
In 2009, 13 people received the Ekushey Padak, three of them posthumously.

1. Burhanuddin Khan Jahangir (education)
2. Syed Anwar Husain (research)
3. Mahbub Ul Alam Choudhury (language movement)
4. Ashraf Uz Zaman Khan (journalism)
5. Begum Bilkis Nasir Uddin (journalism)
6. Manik Chandra Saha (journalism)
7. Humayun Kabir Balu (journalism)
8. Selina Hossain (literature)
9. Shamsuzzaman Khan (research)
10. Qazi Kholiquzzaman Ahmad (poverty reduction)
11. Mohammad Rafi Khan (social service)
12. Monsur Ul Karim (fine arts)
13. Ramendu Majumdar (theatre)
