= 2003 in Bangladesh =

- Centuries: 20th; 21st
- Decades: 1980s; 1990s; 2000s; 2010s; 2020s
- See also: Other events of 2003; List of years in Bangladesh

2003 (MMIII) was a common year starting on Wednesday of the Gregorian calendar, the 2003rd year of the Common Era (CE) and Anno Domini (AD) designations, the 3rd year of the 3rd millennium and the 21st century, and the 4th year of the 2000s decade.

The year 2003 was the 32nd year after the independence of Bangladesh. It was also the third year of the third term of the government of Khaleda Zia.

== Incumbents ==
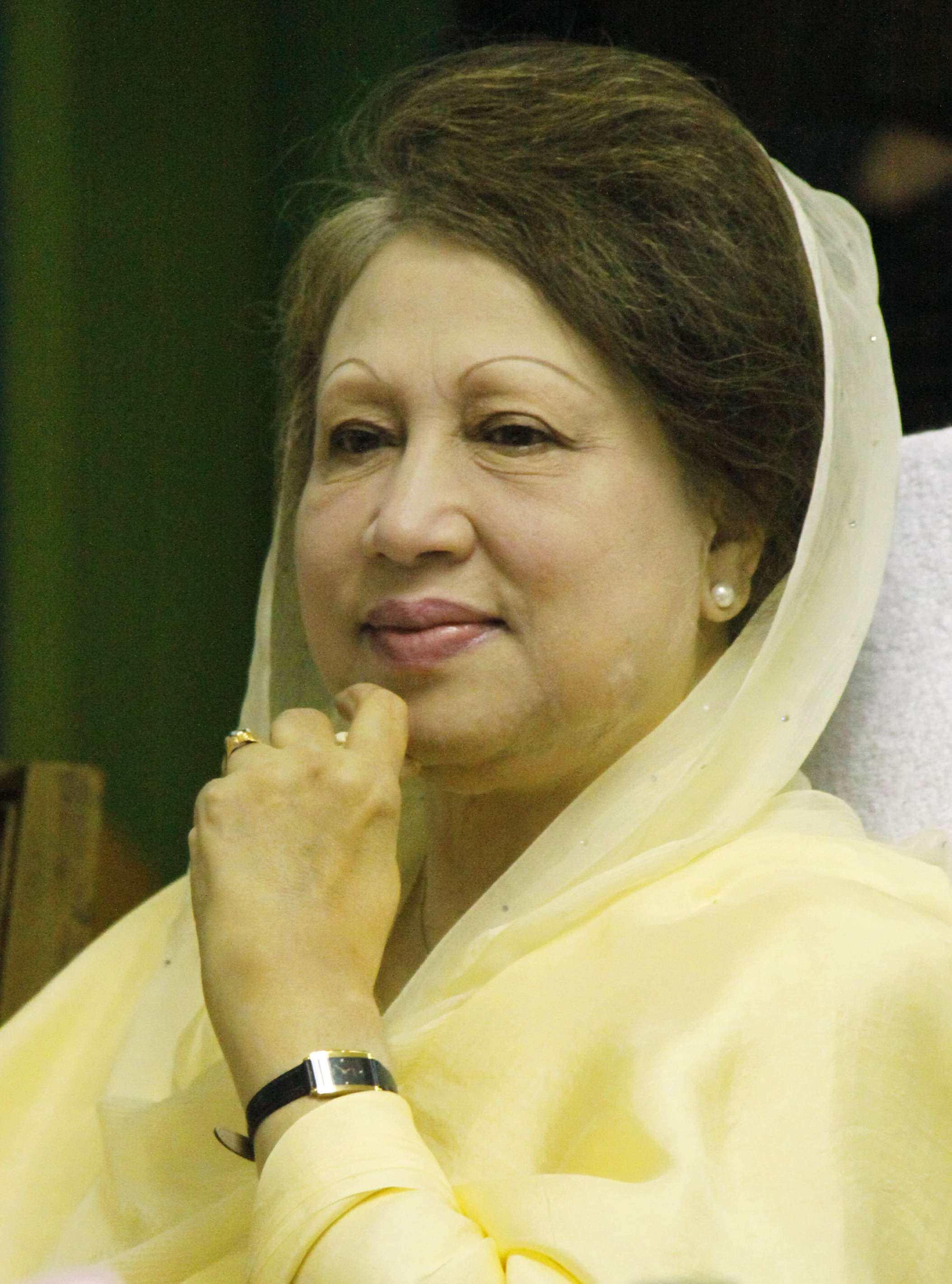
Khaleda
Zia

- President: Iajuddin Ahmed
- Prime Minister: Khaleda Zia
- Chief Justice: Mainur Reza Choudhury (until 22 June), Khondokar Mahmud Hasan (starting 22 June)

== Demography ==
Demographic Indicators for Bangladesh in 2003
Population, total	134,791,598
Population density (per km^{2})	1035.5
Population growth (annual %)	1.7%
Male to Female Ratio (every 100 Female)	105.4
Urban population (% of total)	25.4%
Birth rate, crude (per 1,000 people)	25.4
Death rate, crude (per 1,000 people)	6.4
Mortality rate, under 5 (per 1,000 live births)	73
Life expectancy at birth, total (years)	66.9
Fertility rate, total (births per woman)	2.9

== Climate ==
Climate data for Bangladesh in 2003
Month	Jan	Feb	Mar	Apr	May	Jun	Jul	Aug	Sep	Oct	Nov	Dec	Year
Daily mean °C (°F)	17.8 (64.0)	21.2 (70.2)	24.3 (75.7)	28.1 (82.6)	28.3 (82.9)	28.1 (82.6)	28.4 (83.1)	28.7 (83.7)	28.7 (83.7)	27.4 (81.3)	23.6 (74.5)	19.2 (66.6)	25.3 (77.5)
Average precipitation mm (inches)	5.0 (0.20)	10.9 (0.43)	24.2 (0.95)	70.6 (2.78)	226.9 (8.93)	348.0 (13.70)	651.0 (25.63)	151.2 (5.95)	150.3 (5.92)	299.1 (11.78)	36.3 (1.43)	20.1 (0.79)	1,993.6 (78.49)
Source: Climatic Research Unit (CRU) of University of East Anglia (UEA)

== Economy ==
Key Economic Indicators for Bangladesh in 2003
National Income
	Current US$	Current BDT	% of GDP
GDP	$60.2 billion	BDT3,483.2 billion	
GDP growth (annual %)	4.7%		
GDP per capita	$446.3	BDT25,841	
Agriculture, value added	$11.9 billion	BDT690.1 billion	19.8%
Industry, value added	$13.5 billion	BDT782.8 billion	22.5%
Services, etc., value added	$31.5 billion	BDT1,825.2 billion	52.4%
Balance of Payment
	Current US$	Current BDT	% of GDP
Current account balance	$0.1 billion		.2%
Imports of goods and services	$11.1 billion	BDT565.2 billion	16.2%
Exports of goods and services	$7,928.3 million	BDT398.2 billion	11.4%
Foreign direct investment, net inflows	$268.3 million		0.4%
Personal remittances, received	$3,191.7 million		5.3%
Total reserves (includes gold) at year end	$2,624.6 million		
Total reserves in months of imports	2.8		

Note: For the year 2003 average official exchange rate for BDT was 58.15 per US$.

== Events ==
- 9 January – The Operation Clean Heart came to an end. The Bangladesh Government passed an indemnity law, that provided legal protection to security personnel who participated in the operation. Later, in November 2015, Bangladesh High Court declared the indemnity ordinance illegal and scrapped it.
- 17 January – A bomb attack at the Failya Paglar Mela in Tangail, Bangladesh that resulted in the death of 7 people.
- 12 February - On Eid-ul Fitr, two activists of Awami League are killed inside a madrassah in Hathazari Upazila.
- 18 February- Murder of Sabbir Alam Khandaker takes place in Narayanganj District.
- 20 January – Bangladesh wins the 2003 South Asian Football Federation Gold Cup.
- 10 March- Banshkhali carnage takes place in which seven members of a Hindu family are burned alive in Chittagong.
- 8 July - A ferry named MV Nasrin-1 sunk in the Meghna River near Chandpur at midnight. Of the 750 people on board 220 were rescued.
- 24 July- Businessman Jamaluddin Ahmed Chowdhury was kidnapped. A suspect, Amar Das, in the kidnapping died in police custody on 10 December. His skeleton was recovered on 24 August 2005.
- 27 July – 175 fishermen go missing after storms strike the coast of Bangladesh and 300 homes are destroyed in an earthquake which strikes Chittagong.
- 11 August- Businessman Rezaur Rahman Zakir was murdered after being kidnapped.

=== Awards and recognitions ===
==== Independence Day Award ====
Recipients	Area	Note
Sheikh Mujibur Rahman	liberation War	posthumous
Ziaur Rahman	liberation war	posthumous

==== Ekushey Padak ====
1. Muhammad Shamsul Huq
2. Muhammad Ekramul Huq
3. Zebunnessa Rahman
4. Zobeda Khanum
5. Abdul Mannan Syed
6. Al Mujahidi
7. Anjuman Ara Begum
8. Lokman Hossain Fakir
9. Khan Ataur Rahman
10. Abdul Hamid
11. Nazim Uddin Mostan
12. UNESCO

=== Sports ===
- International football:
  - Bangladesh hosted the 2003 South Asian Football Federation Gold Cup in January and became the champions defeating the Maldives in the final, in front of 46,000 fans present at the Bangabandhu National Stadium.
  - In March, Bangladesh played 2 matches at the 2004 AFC Asian Cup qualifiers against Hong Kong and Laos, failing to win a single match as they crashed out of the qualifiers bottom of their group.
  - In November, Bangladesh played 2 matches against Tajikistan in home and away system as part of 2006 FIFA World Cup qualification – AFC first round and lost both matches.
- Domestic football:
  - Muktijoddha Sangsad KC won the 2003–04 Dhaka Premier Division League while Abahani Limited Dhaka became runner-up.
  - Muktijoddha Sangsad KC won National Football League while Mohammedan SC became runners-up.
- Cricket:
  - The South African national cricket team toured Bangladesh in April and May and played a two-match Test series against the Bangladeshi national cricket team. South Africa won the Test series 2–0.
  - The Bangladesh national cricket team played two Test matches and three One Day International (ODI) matches on a mid-year tour of Australia in 2003. Australia easily won the two-match Test series. Bangladesh's performances' did not get any better during the ODI series—failing to score more than 147 in any innings—as Australia completed a clean-sweep.
  - The Bangladeshi national cricket team visited Pakistan in August to September 2003 and played a three-match Test series against the Pakistani national cricket team. Pakistan won the Test series 3–0. In addition, the teams played a five-match Limited Overs International (LOI) series which Pakistan won 5–0.
  - The English cricket team toured Bangladesh from 12 October to 12 November 2003, playing a two-match Test series and a three-match One Day International series; England won all five matches to take whitewashes in both series.

== See also ==
- 2000s in Bangladesh
- List of Bangladeshi films of 2003
- Timeline of Bangladeshi history
