= Haimanti Rakshit Das =

Bangladeshi singer

Haimanti Rakshit Das হৈমন্তী রক্ষিত দাশ
- Born: Haimanti; 18 June; Chittagong, Bangladesh
- Origin: Dhaka, Bangladesh
- Genres: Classical, modern, pop
- Occupations: Playback singer, stage singer, Radio & Tv
- Instruments: Vocalist, harmonium, piano
- Years active: 1991–present
- Labels: Haimanti , Anupam Music , Cmv, Soundtek, Sangeeta, Eskey Movies , Svf
- Spouse: Milton Das Ashim
- Website: www.haimanti.org

Haimanti Rakshit Das (Bengali: হৈমন্তী রক্ষিত দাশ; born 18 June) better known as Haimanti is a Bangladeshi playback singer. She mostly sings for films and TV series.

She rose to fame after winning reality television competition series Notun Kuri as a child artist. Her discography includes, Dakpion, Mone Pore Tomake, Premer Choya, and Smritir Canvas. Fire Dekha , Prothom Prem , Deyal Kahini . She also attended an academy for children's welfare Jatiyo Shishu Purushkar.

== Early life and personal life ==
Haimanti was born on 18 June in Chittagong, Bangladesh. She comes from a musical family. She completed her post graduation in economics from National University in Bangladesh. Her father is an engineer named Manash Kumar Rakshit and her mother is a housewife named Sharmistha Rakshit Haimanti is married to Milton Das Ashim.

== Career ==
When she was studying in class five her first album Dakpion (1994) was released and then Mone Pore Tomake (1997) and Premer Choya (2000). One of her albums is a duet with singer Asif Akbar. She did playback over 20 films She started first movie music song the name of movie Moner Sathe Juddho, Shotru Shotru Khela, Amon Sudhu Tumar Ei, Pita Matar Amanot and Koti Takar Fokir. Hamanti is singing a movie name Phagun Haway on language movement. She is basically popular for a stage singer. She recently sang a song in a Matal movie called Thako Tumi Pinjare, whose music director Ahmed Imtiaz Bulbul.

== Discography ==
=== Albums ===
1. Dakpion
2. Mone Pore Tomake
3. Premer Choya
4. Smritir Canvas
5. Swapno Dekhi
6. Deyal Kahini
7. Prothom Prem

=== Tracks ===
- Hat Baralei Bondhu Habo
- Jakhoni Tomai Dekhi
- Durga Maa
- Aral Holei Tumi
- Ei Mon Shudhu Tomari
- Jibone Chai Na Kisu
- Brishty
- Ajosro Raat
- Prothom Prem
- Tui Bihone
- Baroshar Jool
- Thako Tumi Hridoy Pinjore
- Dekhini Tomai Kabu
- Bodle Jete Jete
- Jodi Jante Chao
- Amar Ei Hatey
- Bondhu Hobo
- Sob Lal Pathori
- Hridoyer Ainate
- Moner Bhitore

== Awards and nominations ==
Year	Award	Nominated work	Result	Ref.
1993	First Champion	BTV Notun Kuri	Won	
1993	National Child Award	—N/a	Won	
