= Ashique Mustafa =

Bangladeshi writer and journalist

- আশিক মুস্তাফা
- Education: University of Dhaka
- Occupations: Writer; journalist
- Writing career
- Years active: 2007–present
- Notable work: Eksho Foring Ekta Ami
- Notable awards: Agrani Bank Shishu Academy Children's Literature Award; Meena Media Award; Habibur Rahman Literary Award

Ashique Mustafa (Bengali: আশিক মুস্তাফা; born 1986) is a Bangladeshi writer and journalist known primarily for his work in children's literature. He began writing rhymes and short stories for newspapers in 2007, and his first book, Eksho Foring Ekta Ami, was published in 2009. He has received the Agrani Bank Shishu Academy Children's Literature Award, Meena Media Award and the Habibur Rahman Literary Award, and had published around 40 books by 2023.

== Early life and education ==
Ashique was born in 1986 in Majidpur village, Senbagh Upazila, Noakhali District. He moved to Dhaka in 2006 to pursue his studies and began writing rhymes and short stories for newspapers in 2007. He later studied at the University of Dhaka and, in 2015, presented a paper on children's literature at the 4th International Congress of Bengali Studies at the University of Tokyo.

== Writing career ==
Ashique's first book, Eksho Foring Ekta Ami, a collection of children's rhymes, was published in 2009 by Oitijjhya. His work includes children's stories, rhymes, translations, travel writing and comics.

He has worked as an editor of the children's page Ghashforing of the Bengali daily Samakal and contributed to the Shishu Bishyokosh (Children's Encyclopaedia) published by the Bangladesh Shishu Academy. By 2015, he had published 17 books for young readers. By 2023, the number had grown to around 40.

In 2020, eight of his books were published at the Amar Ekushey Book Fair, including Tupuner Bondhura, Tarar Buddhi, Pakhirder Ishkul Bus and 1971 Bichchhu Bahini.

== Awards and recognition ==
Ashique has received several awards for his work in children's literature and media. He received the Shishu Sahitya Award for his translation of Red American folklore.

In 2014, he received the Meena Media Award for his story Shopno Urano Lokta and the Habibur Rahman Literary Award for his short story Chotto Ekta Meye.

For Bengali year 1422 (2015–16), Ashique received the Agrani Bank Shishu Academy Children's Literature Award in the drama category.

In 2018, he received first prize in the Print/Online Media, Creative (Over 18) category of the Meena Media Award.

In 2025, he received the Chhotoder Shomoy Children's Literature Award for his book Bhat Khaowanor Golpo.
