= Mazharul Islam Poetry Award =

Bangladeshi Poetry award

- Type: Civilian
- Country: Bangladesh
- Presented by: Bangla Academy
- Established: 2010
- First award: 2010
- Final award: 2019

Highlights
- Total: 10

The Mazharul Islam Poetry Award (Bengali: মযহারুল ইসলাম কবিতা পুরস্কার; Mazharul Islam Kabita Puroshkar), is given by the Bangla Academy of Bangladesh in recognition of creative genius in advancement and overall contribution in the field of poetry. It was introduced in 2010 to honor the memory of Bangladeshi poet, folklorist, and academic Mazharul Islam.

== Winners ==
- 2010 – Abul Hussain
- 2011 – Syed Shamsul Haq
- 2012 – Shahid Qadri
- 2013 – Belal Chowdhury
- 2014 – Asad Chowdhury
- 2015 – Mohammad Rafiq
- 2016 – Abubakar Siddique
- 2017 – Rubi Rahman
- 2018 – Mohammad Nurul Huda
- 2019 – Mahadev Saha
- 2021 – Sukumar Barua
- 2023 – Nirmalendu Goon
- 2025 – Sanaul Haque Khan

== See also ==
- Bangla Academy Literary Award
