= Shafiul =

Shafiul is a given name. Notable people with the name include:

- Mohammad Shafiul Alam (born 1959), Bangladeshi civil servant
- Shafiul Alam, cricketer from Bangladesh
- M. Shafiul Azam, two-star officer of the Bangladesh Navy
- SM Shafiul Azam (1923–1991), Bangladeshi civil servant
- Shafiul Azim, CEO and managing director of Biman Bangladesh Airlines
- Abu Belal Muhammad Shafiul Haque (born 1958), four star general of the Bangladesh Army
- Morshed Shafiul Hasan (born 1953), Bangladeshi essayist, researcher, critic, and poet
- Shafiul Hayet (born 1997), Bangladeshi cricketer
- Shafiul Islam (born 1989), Bangladeshi cricketer
- Shafiul Islam Mohiuddin, Bangladeshi business leader
- Shafiul Alam Chowdhury Nadel (born 1969), Bangladeshi politician
- Dewan Shafiul Arefin Tutul (born 1960), Bangladeshi footballer

== See also ==
- Murder of A. K. M. Shafiul Islam in 2014
