= AFM Alim Chowdhury =

Bangladeshi eye specialist (1928–1971)

- এ এফ এম আবদুল আলীম চৌধুরী
- Born: 16 April 1928; Kishoreganj, Bengal, British India
- Died: 1971 (aged 42–43); Rayer Bazaar, Dhaka, Bangladesh
- Resting place: Azimpur, Dhaka, Bangladesh
- Education: Calcutta Islamia College; Dhaka Medical College
- Occupation: Eye specialist
- Known for: Martyred Intellectual
- Spouse: Shyamoli Nasrin Chowdhury
- Children: 2

Abul Fayez Mohammad Abdul Alim Chowdhury (1928–1971) was an eye specialist in Bangladesh. He was abducted by the Al-Badr militia as part of a plan to kill the renowned intellectuals of the country and was found dead on 18 December 1971 at Rayer Bazaar in Dhaka.

== Early life and career ==
Chowdhury was born in the village Khoyerpur in Kishoreganj in 1928. He passed metric examination from Kishoreganj Govt Boys High School in 1945. Then he went to Calcutta Islamia College, where he passed the Intermediate examination in 1947. He studied in Dhaka Medical College and received an MBBS degree from there in 1955. In 1961, he received a D.O. degree from London.

Chowdhury worked at St James's Hospital as a registrar from 1961 to 1963. He returned to Bangladesh in 1963 and joined Kumudini Hospital in Mirzapur as a chief ophthalmologist. In 1967, he became an associate professor at postgraduate medicine and research institute in Dhaka and joined Dhaka Medical College as an associate professor in 1968.

Chowdhury was active in leftist politics from his student life. He was an active participant in the 1952 Bengali language movement. In 1971, he was working as an associate professor at the Department of Ophthalmology in Sir Salimullah Medical College. He played an active role in forming the East Pakistan Medical Association (current Bangladesh Medical Association), and was elected the general secretary of the association.

== Creative activities ==
Chowdhury had a preference for photography and creative writing. He edited two monthly magazines named Bengali: খাপছাড়া, romanized: Khāpachāṛā and Bengali: যাত্রিক, romanized: Yātrika in his student life. He worked as sub-editor for two newspapers named Bengali: দৈনিক ইত্তেহাদ, romanized: Dainika ittēhāda and Bengali: দৈনিক মিল্লাত, romanized: Dainika millāta.

== Personal life ==
Chowdhury left behind his wife and two daughters. His wife, Shyamoli Nasrin Chowdhury is a national award-winning educationist and former principal of Udayan School. Both of his daughters are physicians, one an eye specialist.

== Abduction and death ==
As part of a planned assault on Bengali intellectuals, Chowdhury was abducted by Al-Badr militants on 15 December 1971. His dead body was found along with the bodies of many other intellectuals at Rayerbazar mass grave, Dhaka.

Moulana Abdul Mannan, one of the key collaborators of the Pakistan army during the Liberation war of Bangladesh, was directly involved in the abduction and killing of Chowdhury. Chowdhury had been living in Purana Paltan in 1971. In the mid of July, Moulana Mannan, an organizer of Al-Badr, came to Chowdhury for a shelter as he was shelterless and destitute at that time. Former speaker A.T.M.A. Matin was neighbor of Chowdhury. It was Matin whose request made him to rent his ground floor to Mannan. On 15 December, some members of Al-Badr came to his house and took him away. Chowdhury never returned. Moulana Mannan absconded on 16 December.

On 18 December, Chowdhury was found dead along with other intellectuals at Rayer Bazar mass grave. Later, he was buried in Azimpur graveyard.

On 3 November 2013, Chowdhury Mueen-Uddin, a Muslim leader based in London, and Ashrafuz Zaman Khan, based in the US, were sentenced in absentia after the court found that they were involved in the abduction and murders of 18 people – nine Dhaka University teachers, six journalists and three physicians including Chowdhury – in December 1971.
