= Zakir Talukder =

Bangladeshi writer

- জাকির তালুকদার
- Born: January 20, 1965 (age 61); Rajshahi District, East Pakistan, Pakistan
- Awards: Bangla Academy Literary Award

Portrait of Bangladeshi writer Zakir Talukder

Zakir Talukder is a Bangladeshi fiction writer. Some of his notable works include Kursinama, Musolmanmongol, Kobi O Kamini, Chhayabastob, Kalpana Chakma O Rajar Sepai, and Pitrigon. In 2014, he was awarded the Bangla Academy Award for his novel Musolmanmongol.

After 10 years, He returned the Bangla Academy Award that he received for his contribution to fiction, accusing the academy is currently grappling with a lack of "democracy".

== Background and career ==
Zakir was born on January 20, 1965 in present-day Natore District, Bangladesh.

== Works ==
Short Story Collections

- Shwapnojatra Kingba Udbastupuran (1997)
- Bishwasher Agun (2000)
- Konya o Jolkonna (2003)
- Kalpana Chakma o Rajar Sepai (2006; 2nd edition 2014)
- Rajnoitik Galpo: Ha-Bhatbhumi (2006)
- Matrihanta o Onnanno Galpo (2007)
- The Uprooted Image (2008)
- Galposhomogro – Volume 1 (2010)
- Jojongondha (2012)
- Bachai Galpo (2013)
- Gorosthane Jochhona (2014)
- Behular Dwitiyo Bashor (2018)

Novels

- Kursinama (2002; West Bengal edition 2012)
- Haatte Thaka Manusher Gaan (2006)
- Bohiragoto (2008)
- Musolmanmongol (2009)
- Pitrigon (2011)
- Kobi o Kamini (2012)
- Chhayabastob (2013)
- 1992 (2017)
- Uponyash Chotustoy (2018)

Essays

- Galpopath (2001)
- Bangla Sahityer Swadesh Protyaborton (2011)
- Muktogodyo: Karl Marx – ManushTi Kemon Chilen (2014)
- Jakir Talukderer Muktogodyo (2018)

Juvenile Literature

- Chalanbiler Rupkotha (2004)
- Mayer Jonno Bhalobasha (2012)
- Bondhu Amar (2016)
- Gayer Bari Nayer Bari (2018)

Poetry (Rhymes)

- Tintiri (1989)
- Naimama Kanamama (1995)
