= Kamal Chowdhury =

Bengali poet

- কামাল চৌধুরী
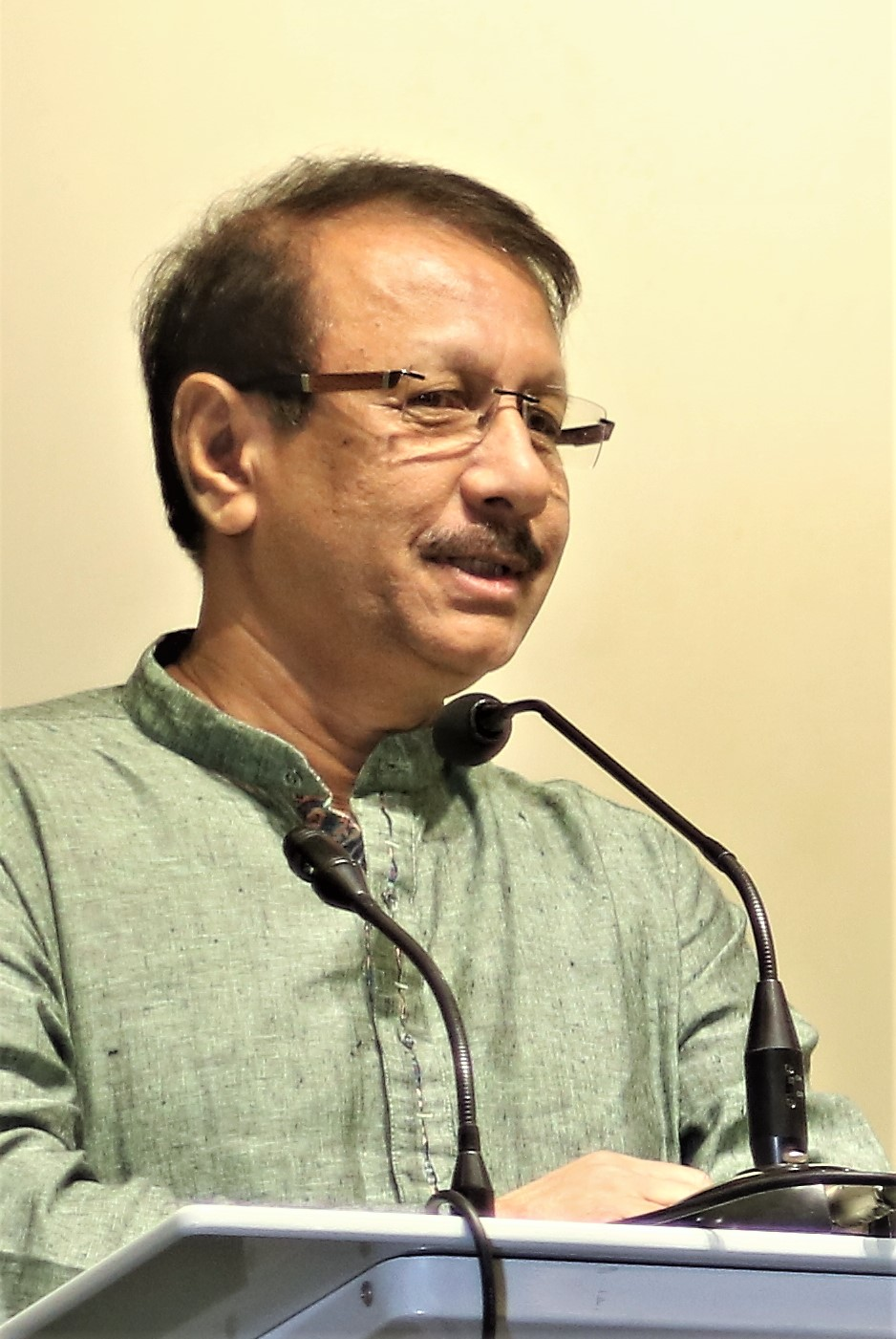
- Chowdhury in 2018

Education and Cultural Affairs Adviser to the Prime Minister of Bangladesh
- In office 11 January 2024 – 5 August 2024
- Prime Minister: Sheikh Hasina
- Succeeded by: TBD

Personal details
- Born: Kamal Abdul Naser Chowdhury; 28 January 1957 (age 69) Comilla district, East Pakistan, Pakistan
- Education: Ph.D
- Alma mater: University of Dhaka
- Awards: Bangla Academy Literary Award (2011), Ekushey Padak(2022)

Kamal Abdul Naser Chowdhury (known as Kamal Chowdhury; born 31 December 1957) is a Bengali poet and former member of the Bangladesh Civil Service. he is the former adviser to the prime minister of Bangladesh. He was the Chief Coordinator of the National Implementation Committee for the Celebration of Mujib Borsho, the Birth Centenary of Sheikh Mujibur Rahman, the founding father of Bangladesh. He is a former principal secretary of the Prime Minister of Bangladesh.

He is mostly known for his works on literature, especially poetry. He was awarded the Bangla Academy Literary Award in 2011 for his contributions to Bengali poetry and the Ekushe Podok 2022 for his contributions to Bengali language and literature.

== Early life and education ==
Chowdhury was born on 31 December 1957, in Vijaykara village of Chauddagram Upazila of Comilla District. He is the second among six children of Ahmad Hossain Chowdhury and Begum Tahira Hossain. In 1973, he passed Secondary School Certificate from Gaidyanil High School in Narayanganj District and Higher Secondary School Certificate from Dhaka College in 1975. Then he studied sociology at University of Dhaka and received Bachelor's and master's degree. In 2000, he completed PhD in anthropology at the retirement of government jobs. The subject of his PhD dissertation is 'Matrutulan Rasa tradition of Garo people'.

== Career ==
In 1982, Kamal Chowdhury took up the job as a member of the Bangladesh Civil Service.

After serving jobs in different positions in 2010, he was promoted as secretary of the government of Bangladesh. While being additional secretary of the Ministry of Information (Bangladesh), he was appointed as acting secretary of the same ministry. Afterwards, he served as secretary of information for some time.

From 2010 to 2014 he was the secretary of Ministry of Education. After that, he served as the secretary of the Ministry of Public Administration from March 2014. At this time, he was promoted as the senior secretary of the government. After retiring from work in late 2016, he was appointed as the principal secretary of Prime Minister of Bangladesh. He also represented Bangladesh at the UNESCO Executive Board for the term 2014–2017.

On 22 January 2022, Chowdhury was awarded the Ekushey Padak, the second most important award for civilians in Bangladesh.

On 11 January 2024, he was inducted as an advisor of Prime minister Sheikh Hasina, in the rank and status of a cabinet minister. He was detained on 2 October after the fall of the Awami League government led by Sheikh Hasina.

== Personal life ==
Chowdhury's younger brother, Abdullah Al Mohsin Chowdhury, was the secretary of the Ministry of Defence.

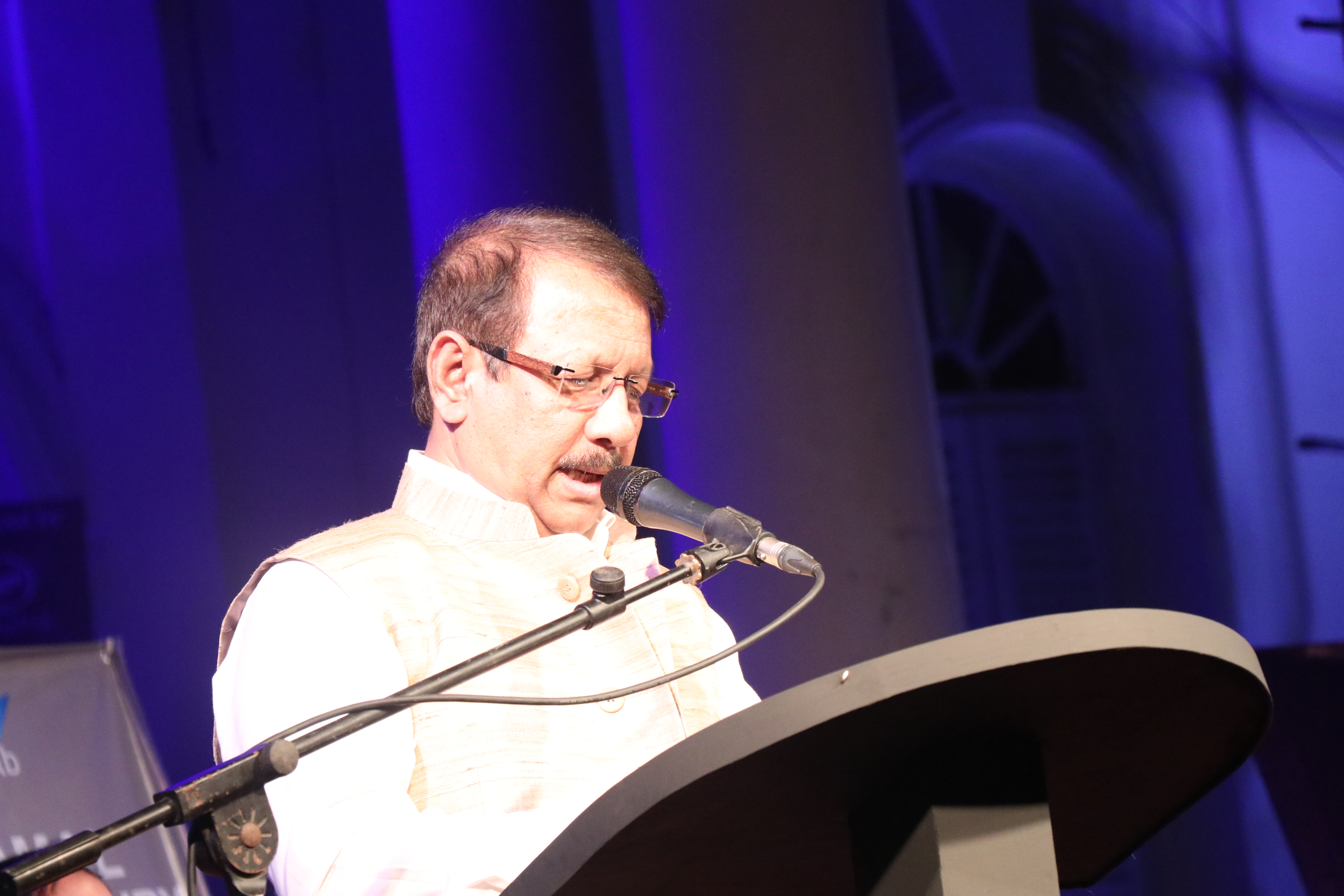
Chowdhury discussing poetry translation at Dhaka Lit Fest 2017

== Publications ==
Kamal Chowdhury's first poetry book was published in the year 1981. The list of his poetry books are:

- Michhiler Shoman Boyoshi (As Old as the Procession), 1981
- Ae Poth Ae Kolahol, 1993
- Asheci Nejer Vore, 1995
- Ae Meg Biduthe Vora, 1997
- Duli O Sagor Drisho, 2000
- Rod Brishti Antomil, 2003
- He Mati Prithibiputro, 2006
- Premer Kobita, 2008
- Panthoshalar Ghora, 2010

== Awards ==
- Bangla Academy Literary Award (2011)
- Ekushey Padak(2022)
