= Shyamoli Nasrin Chowdhury =

Bangladeshi educationist

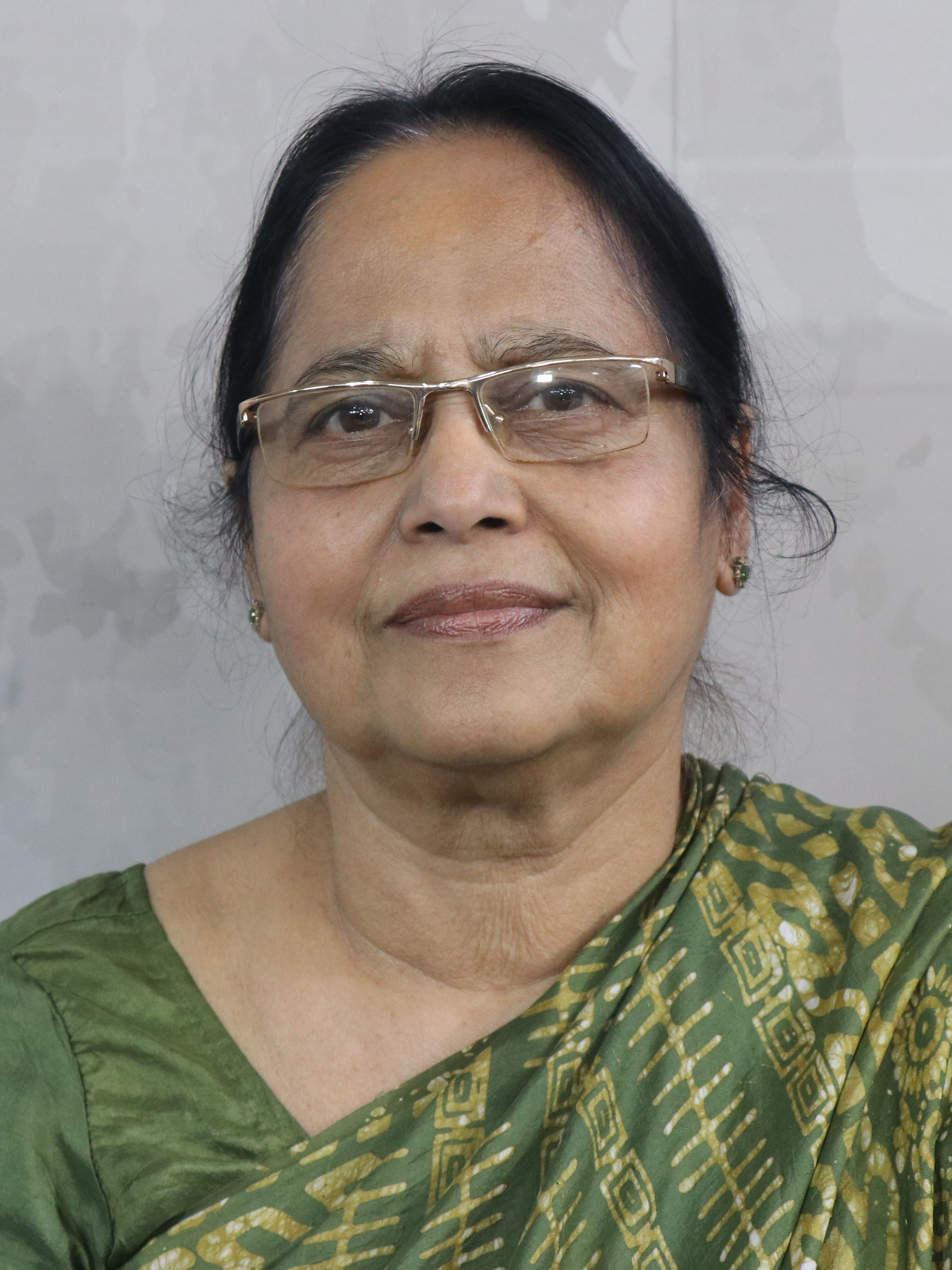
- Chowdhury in 2018
- Born: 22 April 1942 (age 84); Sherpur, Bengal, British India
- Occupation: school academic
- Spouse: AFM Alim Chowdhury (m. 1965–1971)
- Awards: Ekushey Padak

Shyamoli Nasrin Chowdhury (born 22 April 1942) is a Bangladeshi educationist. She was awarded Ekushey Padak in 2001 by the Government of Bangladesh.

== Career ==
Chowdhury joined the Udayan School on February 15, 1966. She later became the principal of the school. She also served as the Headmistress of Uddipan School.

She is the president of the executive committee of Bangladesh Nari Progati Sangha.

== Personal life ==
On December 22, 1965, Shyamoli Chowdhury married AFM Alim Chowdhury, an ophthalmologist. He was abducted and later killed by Jamaat's militia wing Al-Badr militants on December 15, 1971. In 2013, she testified as the 13th witness against Motiur Rahman Nizami standing trial for charges of crimes against humanity at International Crimes Tribunal. She alleged Moulana Abdul Mannan, an organizer of Al-Badr, was in conspiration of killing her husband.

Chowdhury had two daughters including Farzana Choudhury Nipa. She later married Hafiz, the younger brother of Alim Chowdhury.

== Awards ==
- Ekushey Padak, 2001
- Agrani Bank Shishu Academy Child literature Award, 2017
