= Abdul Mannan (Chandpur politician) =

Bangladeshi politician (1935–2006)

- আবদুল মান্নান

Minister of Religious Affairs
- In office 1986 – 14 June 1988

Member of the Bangladesh Parliament for Comilla-24
- In office 2 April 1979 – 24 March 1982
- Preceded by: Mizanur Rahman Chowdhury
- Succeeded by: Position abolished

Member of the Bangladesh Parliament for Chandpur-6
- In office 10 July 1986 – 6 December 1990
- Preceded by: Position created
- Succeeded by: Alamgir Hyder Khan

Personal details
- Born: March 9, 1935
- Died: 6 February 2006 (aged 71) Dhaka, Bangladesh

Abdul Mannan (9 March 1935 – 6 February 2006) was a Bangladeshi religious leader and journalist who served as the minister for religious affairs in the cabinet of Hussain Muhammad Ershad. He was the founder of Daily Inqilab. He was accused of being a collaborator of the Pakistan Army and was accused of war crimes during the Bangladesh Liberation War.

== Early life and education ==
Mannan was born on 9 March 1935 in Faridganj Upazila of Chandpur District. After completing his education at a madrasa, he began his career as a teacher.

== Career ==
Mannan was a general secretary of the Islamic Advisory Council and Regional Council during the administration of Ayub Khan.

=== Controversies ===
On 29 September, under the leadership of Mannan, a group of the teachers of Madrasah met Amir Abdullah Khan Niazi. At that meeting, Mannan gave a copy of the Quran to General Niazi and stated that they are ready to support the Pakistan army to preserve the security of Pakistan and the glory of Islam.

Mannan was allegedly involved in the abduction and murder of physician AFM Alim Chowdhury.

=== After 1971 ===
After independence, he became the president of the Jamiat-e-Mudarressin Bangladesh, an organisation of madrasah teachers, and the founder of the Daily Inqilab, one of the country's highly circulated newspapers. In Saptahik Bichitra (a weekly magazine), Mannan denied that he had been a member of the Peace Committee and claimed that he had not issued any statement in favor of the Pakistan Army and the genocide committed by them.

In 1979, he was elected a lawmaker from Chandpur and was appointed minister by President Hussain Muhammad Ershad's cabinet.

== Trial and release ==
Hotel Intercontinental and Holy Family Hospital was declared neutral zones by the government on 11 December 1971. Mannan took shelter in one of these zones.

In a report released in March 1994, a People's Inquiry Commission identified, in addition to Ghulam Azam, eight others as the collaborators of the Al-Badr in the atrocities. Mannan was one of those identified collaborators.

Shyamoli Nasrin Chowdhury, wife of AFM Alim Chowdhury, alleges that Mannan was responsible for the death of her husband.

== Death ==
Mannan died on 6 February 2006 at his Banani residence in Dhaka. His funeral was held at the Gausul Azam Mosque Complex in Mohakhali the next day, where he was buried.
