= National Child Award =

- (জাতীয় শিশু পুরস্কার)
- Awarded for: Showing excellent talent in 62 topics
- Sponsored by: Bangladesh Shishu Academy
- Country: Bangladesh
- First award: 1978
- Final award: 2017

The National Child Award is the most notable among the activities of Bangladesh Shishu Academy. This contest has been held since 1978. Competition was held in two groups of 62 topics in literature, culture and sports. In the upazila level, the first place in the district has participated in the national level after crossing the district level and the zonal level. In this competition, about 3 lakh children participate in the opportunity to develop their talents every year. The goal of this competition is to explore the latent talents and talents of children from the grassroots level.

== See also ==
- Agrani Bank Shishu Academy Children's Literature Award
