= Agrani Bank Shishu Academy Children's Literature Award =

- Type: National
- Description: Prize for writers working on children's literature
- Country: Bangladesh
- Presented by: Bangladesh Shishu Academy
- Established: 1981
- First award: 1981
- Final award: 2017
- Website: https://www.shishuacademy.gov.bd

Agrani Bank Shishu Academy Children's Literature Award is a prize for writers working on children's literature, which is provided by the Bangladesh Shishu Academy. In 1981, Agrani Bank and Children's Literature Award was instituted. It was named 'Agrani Bank-Shishu Sahitya Puraskar' since 2007.

== History ==
Agrani Bank-Shishu Academy Child literature award was instituted in 1981. From 2007 it was named 'Agrani Bank-Shishu Sahitya Puraskar'. Since 2008 it has been named 'Agrani Bank-Shishu Academy Child Literature Award'. This award was organized based on the book published in the Bengali year. Each year seven awards were given in the category of poetry, rhymes, novels-fairytale, translation-travelogue, Bangabandhu, Liberation War and other biographies, health-science-technology, drama and book ornamentation etc. 15 thousand Bangladeshi taka, crest and awards are given as awards.

== Awards ==
=== 1418 (2011) ===
- Rashed Rauf, Category: Poetry, Rhymes, and song
- Khaled Hossain, Category: Poetry, Rhymes, and song
- Mohit Kamal, Category: Story, Novel, and fairy-tale
- Kazi Keya, Category: Bangabandhu, Liberation war
- Tapan Chakrabarty, Category: Health, Science, Technology
- Nashim Ahmed, Category: Book Artist

=== 1419 (2012) ===
- Hasnath Amzad, Category: Poetry, Rhymes and song
- Dontossow Rowshan, Category: Story, Novel, and fairy-tale
- Hanif Khan, Category: Drama
- Moniruzzaman Palash, Category: Book Artist
- Sheikh Anowar, Category: Health, Science, Technology

=== 1420 (2013) ===
- Sukumar Barua, Category: Poetry, Rhymes and song
- Akhtar Hossain, Category: Poetry, Rhymes and song
- Dipu Mahmud, Category: Story, Novel, and fairytale
- Faruk Hossain, Category: Translation and travel story
- Sohel Amin Babu, Category: Bangabandhu and Liberation war
- A S M Babor Ali, Category: Drama
- Biplob Chakrabarty, Category: Book artist

=== 1421 (2014) ===
- Romen Raihan
- Imtiar Shamim
- Tapan Bagchi
- Munsur Aziz
- Momin Uddin Khaled

=== 1422 (2015) ===
- Imdadul Haq Milan
- Mahfuzur Rahman
- Palash Mahbub
- Rita Bhowmic
- Ali Ashgar
- Hasan Khurshid Rumi
- Ashique Mustafa
- Sabbyasaci Mishtri

=== 1423 (2016) ===
- Abul Momen
- Moshiur Rahman
- Moshtak Ahmed
- Maruful Islam
- Ahmad Ullah
- Shyamoli Nasrin Chowdhury
- Mizanur Rahman Kollol
- Jamil Bin Siddique
- Uttam Sen
