= Zubaida Gulshan Ara =

Bangladeshi writer

- Born: c. 1943/44
- Died: 19 March 2017 (aged 74); Dhaka, Bangladesh
- Occupation: writer
- Spouse: Mahmudul Amin
- Awards: Ekushey Padak

Zubaida Gulshan Ara (c. 1943/44 is a Bangladeshi writer. She was the chairperson of Bangladesh Shishu Academy. She was awarded Ekushey Padak in 2005 by the Government of Bangladesh.

== Career ==
Ara wrote 50 books. She served as the general secretary of "Sahitto Bangladesh", a literary organization.
