= Saymon Zakaria =

Bangladeshi folk researcher

- সাইমন জাকারিয়া
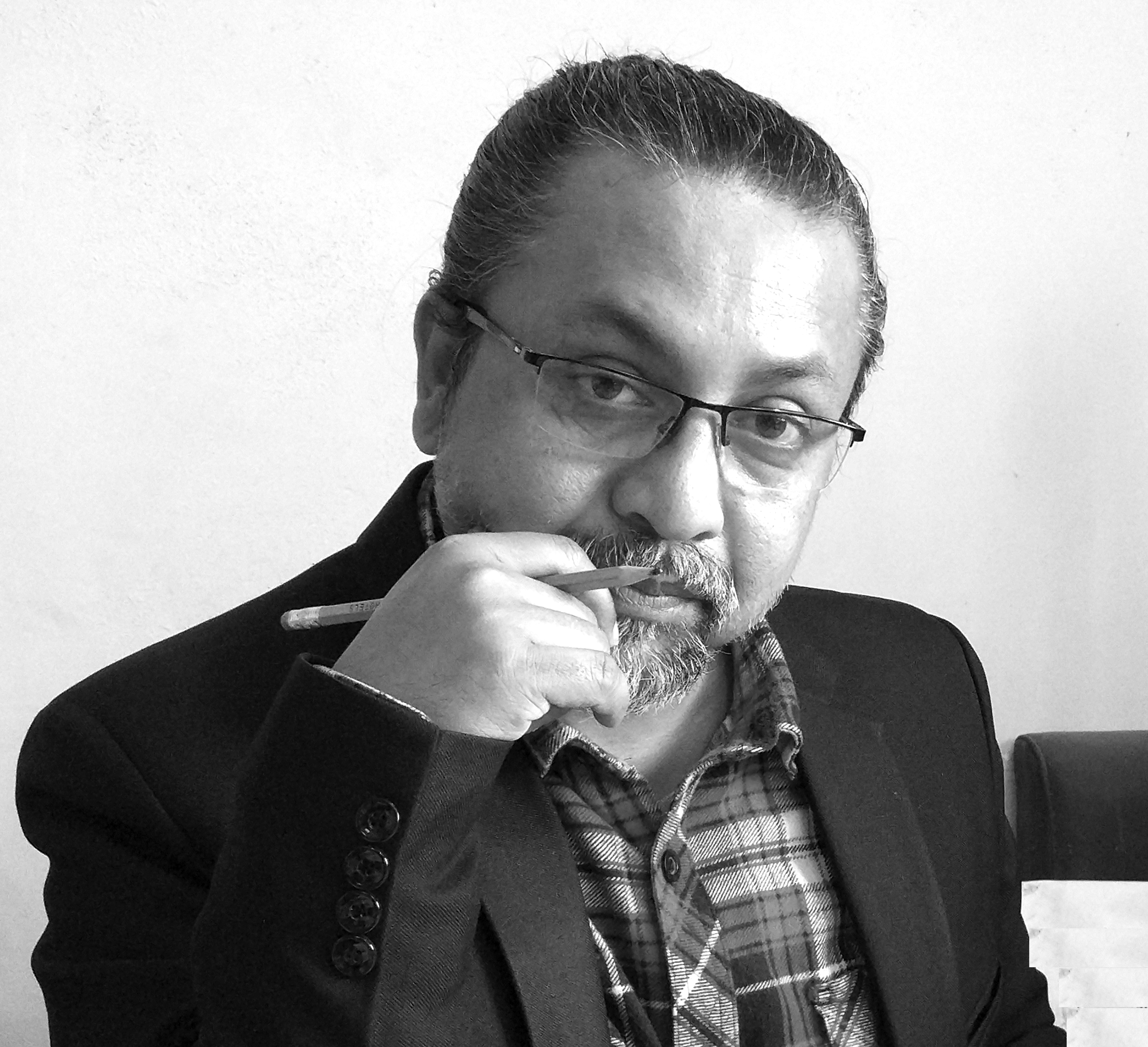
- Zakaria in 2020
- Born: 3 December 1972 (age 53); Kushtia, Bangladesh
- Education: Jahangirnagar University; University of Dhaka
- Occupation: Folk researcher
- Awards: Bangla Academy Literary Award (2019)

Saymon Zakaria (born 3 December 1972) is a Bangladeshi folk researcher and deputy director of the Department of Research in the Bangla Academy. He was awarded the Bangla Academy Literary Award in 2020 for his contribution to Bangladeshi folklore.

== Early life ==
Zakaria was born on 3 December 1972 at Jungli village under Kumarkhali Upazila of Kushtia District in Bangladesh. He received a Master of Philosophy on The Characters of Rama and Sita in the Popular Versions of the Ramayana in Bangladesh from Jahangirnagar University and obtained a Doctor of Philosophy on the Traditional Theater in Bangladesh: Content and Mode of Language from the University of Dhaka.

== Career ==
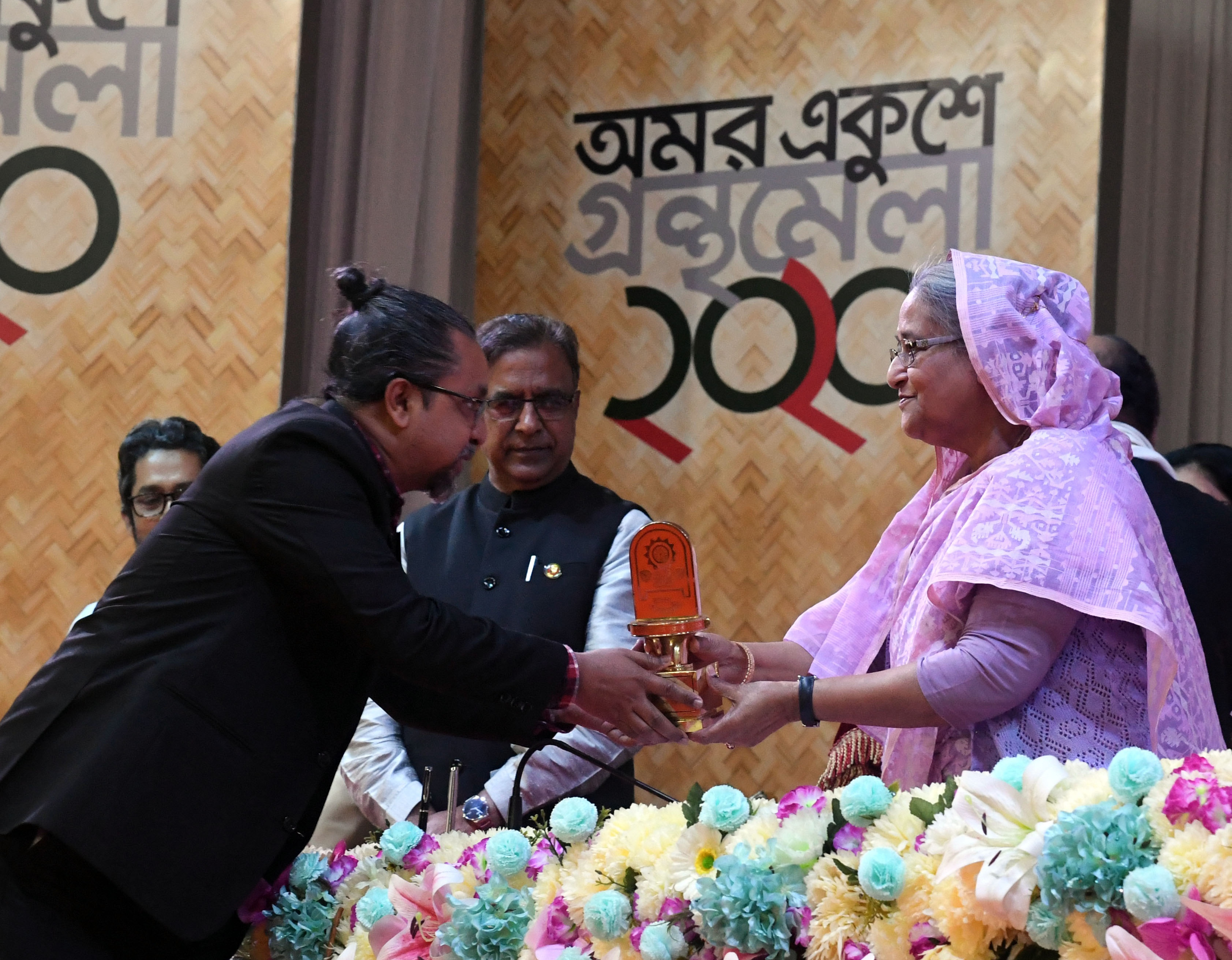
Zakaria receiving 2019 Bangla Academy Literary Award

He has delivered academic lectures on language, literature, and culture to the University of Chicago, the University of Pennsylvania, the University of California (Santa Barbara), the University of Washington, the Tokyo University of Foreign Studies, and the Sapientia-Hungarian University of Transylvania, IRCI (Japan). Additionally, he has attended and conducted various workshops in France, Hungary, Austria, the Czech Republic, Germany, Sri Lanka, Turkey, the Kyrgyz Republic, Nepal, the Philippines, Morocco, and different regions of India. He is an editor of Bhābanagara: International Journal of Bengal Studies. He received his PhD on The Traditional Theater in Bangladesh: Content and Mode of Language. His MPhil was on The Characters of Rama and Sita in the Popular Versions of the Ramayana in Bangladesh.

Zakaria joined the Bangla Academy's folklore department as a manuscript editor in 2005. He was the research assistant of the cultural survey project at the Asiatic Society of Bangladesh in 2004, research lead of the UNESCO's Action Plan for the Safeguarding of Baul Songs project run by the Bangladesh Shilpakala Academy in 2010, and the sub-editor of the daily Samakal.

== Major publications ==
Some of his notable publications includes:

=== Bibliography ===
- Prachin Banglar Buddho Natok (The Buddhist Theatre in Ancient Bengal), 2007
- Bangladesher Lokonatok: Bisoy o Angik-Boychittra (Folk-Theatre in Bangladesh : Variation of Content and Phenomenon), 2008
- Abaṇāgabaṇa: samakālīna Bāṃlā bhāṣāya prācīna caryāpadera rūpāntarita gītabāṇī, 2010
- Banga sahityer alikhita Itihas (co-editor), 2010
- Pronomohi Bongomata: Indigenous Cultural Forms of Bangladesh, 2011
- Folklore o Likhito Sahitya : Jaarigaaner Asore 'Bishad-Sindhu' Attikoron o Poribeshon Poddhoti (co-editor), 2012
- Bangladesher Oitijjobahi Badyajantro (co-editor), 2013
- Bangladesher Lokosogeet, 2014
- Selim Al Din Racanasamagra (complete literary works of Selim Al-Din), 8 vols, 2005–2013
- Baulsangeet (co-editor), 2013
- Traditional Music Instruments of Bangladesh, 2018
- City of Mirrors: Songs of Lālan Sā̃i, 2017

=== Others ===
- Suru kari bhumir name (drama), 1996
- Ke Tahare Cinte Pare (novel), 2009
- Sadanonder sansare (a collection of poems), 2009
- Natoksangroho vol. 1 & 2 (a collection of play), 2010
- Anandamoyer Agomone (a collection of poems), 2011
- Uttarlaloncarita, 2014
- Bodhidrum : Ekti Buddha Natak, 2014
- Rabindranath: Janamanusher Kachhe
- Pronomohi Bongomata, 2004–2017
- Doyaal Tomar Asol Namta ki, 2017
- Kulhara Kalongkini, 2017

== Awards ==
- Madhusudan Academy awards (2018)
- Kāli o Kalama-HSBC young writers award (2008)
- Protham Alo Best Book of the Year 1415 (2009)
- Bangla Academy Literary Award (2019)
