= Mohit Kamal =

Bangladeshi psychiatrist (born 1960)

Litterateur Mohit Kamal
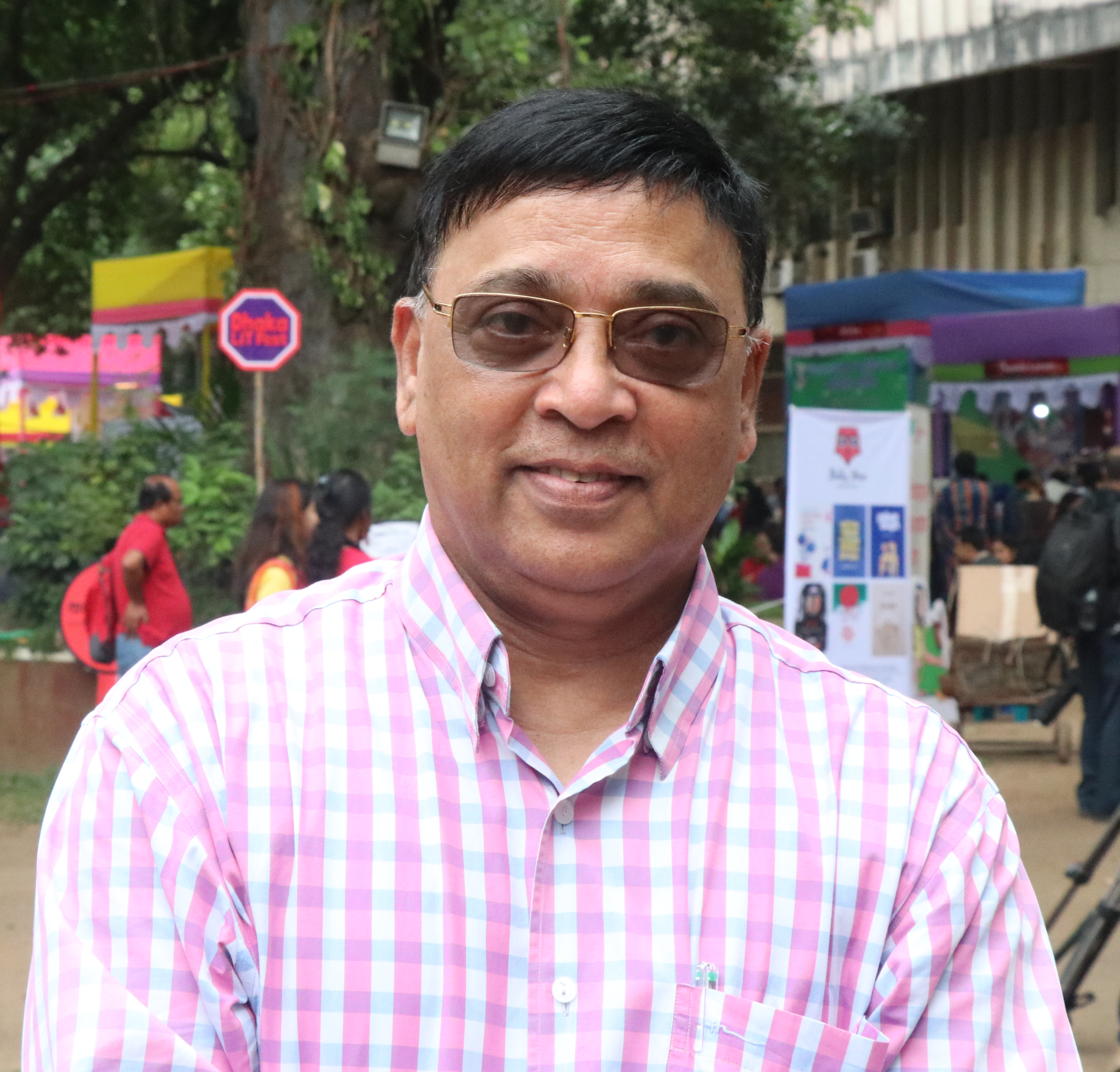
- Bangla Academy Fellow, Editor, Shabdaghar Shabdaghar: A Literary and Cultural Monthly Magazine.
- Born: January 2, 1960 (age 66); Chittagong
- Occupations: Psychiatrist, writer
- Awards: Agrani Bank Shishu Academy Child literature Award (2011); Bangla Academy Literary Award (2018)

Mohit Kamal (born 2 January 1960) is a Bangladeshi psychiatrist specialized in narcotics/drug addiction related issues. He is a professor of psychotherapy and a former director of National Institute of Mental Health and Hospital, Dhaka. He is also a fiction writer. In recognition of his contributions to child literature, he received Agrani Bank Shishu Academy Child literature Award in 2011 and won Bangla Academy Literary Award-2018 in fiction category.

== Early life ==
Kamal was born on 2 January 1960 at Sandwip Upazila of Chittagong to Asadul Haq and Masuda Khatun. He completed his secondary education from Chittagong Collegiate School and College and higher secondary from Chittagong College. He obtained his MBBS degree from Sylhet MAG Osmani Medical College.

== Awards ==
- Agrani Bank Shishu Academy Child literature Award, 2011
- Bangla Academy Literary Award (2018)
