= MV Nasrin-1 =

Ferry

MV Nasrin-1 was a ferry that sank in the Meghna River near Chandpur, Bangladesh, on the night of July 8, 2003. Of the 750 people on board, 220 were rescued.

== Background ==
MV Nasrin-1 was a passenger ferry operating in Bangladesh, primarily used for river transport across the country's extensive network of rivers. Ferries are a common mode of transport in Bangladesh, which has numerous rivers and waterways. However, the ferry services have often been criticized for poor safety standards and overloading.

== Incident ==
On the night of July 8, 2003, MV Nasrin-1 was traveling on the Meghna River near Chandpur. The ferry was reportedly carrying around 750 passengers, far exceeding its capacity. Around midnight, the vessel encountered severe weather conditions, which contributed to its capsizing and eventual sinking. Eyewitnesses reported that the ferry was hit by strong winds and waves, leading to a sudden and catastrophic loss of stability.

== Rescue and Recovery Operations ==
Rescue operations were launched immediately after the incident was reported. The Bangladeshi Navy, Coast Guard, and local fishermen participated in the search and rescue efforts. Despite their efforts, only 220 passengers were rescued. The strong currents and poor visibility hampered the rescue operations. Over the following days, rescuers recovered bloated bodies floating downstream, and many more were feared to be trapped inside the sunken ferry.

== Aftermath ==
The MV Nasrin-1 disaster was one of the deadliest ferry accidents in Bangladesh's history. The exact number of casualties remains uncertain, but estimates suggest that several hundred people lost their lives. The disaster highlighted the chronic issues of overloading and inadequate safety measures in Bangladesh's ferry services.

In the aftermath, the Bangladeshi government and various maritime authorities vowed to implement stricter safety regulations and improve enforcement. However, subsequent incidents have indicated that ferry safety remains a significant concern in the country.

== Legal Proceedings and Compensation ==
In 2017, the High Court of Bangladesh ordered compensation amounting to Tk 171 million (approximately US$2 million) for the victims of the MV Nasrin-1 disaster. The court upheld a lower court's verdict, emphasizing the need for accountability and compensation for the victims' families.

== Ferry Safety in Bangladesh ==
Bangladesh has a long history of ferry accidents, often attributed to overcrowding, poor maintenance, and lax enforcement of safety regulations. The country's rivers are vital transportation routes, but the ferry services are frequently marred by such tragic incidents. Efforts to improve safety standards have been ongoing, but challenges persist.
