= 2003 Tangail shrine bombing =

Terrorist incident in Bangladesh

Coordinates: 24.2787°N 90.1017°E

- Location: Tangail, Bangladesh
- Date: 17 January 2003 (UTC+06:00)
- Target: Bangladesh Awami League
- Attack type: Mass murder; bomb attack; terrorism
- Deaths: 7
- Injuries: 20
- Perpetrator: Jamaat-ul-Mujahideen Bangladesh

2003 Tangail shrine bombing was a bomb attack on 17 January 2003 at the Failya Paglar Mela in Tangail, Bangladesh that resulted in the death of 7 people.

== Attacks ==
The Failya Paglar Mela is the largest fair of Greater Mymensingh area. The fair is held in the remote Dariapur village every year. On 17 January 2003, two bombs exploded within minutes of each other. The three day fair attracts 10 thousand attendees. Hundreds were present in the fair including a Bangladesh Police security team. The explosion killed 7 people.

== Reactions ==
Haris Chowdhury, the political secretary to Khaleda Zia, the Prime Minister of Bangladesh, blamed the opposition parties for the blast. Some locals blamed it on land disputes over the shrine. Further investigation found the involvement of Jamaat-ul-Mujahideen Bangladesh in the blast.
