= Swarochish Sarkar =

Bengali lexicographer and grammarian

Sworochish Sarker
- স্বরোচিষ সরকার
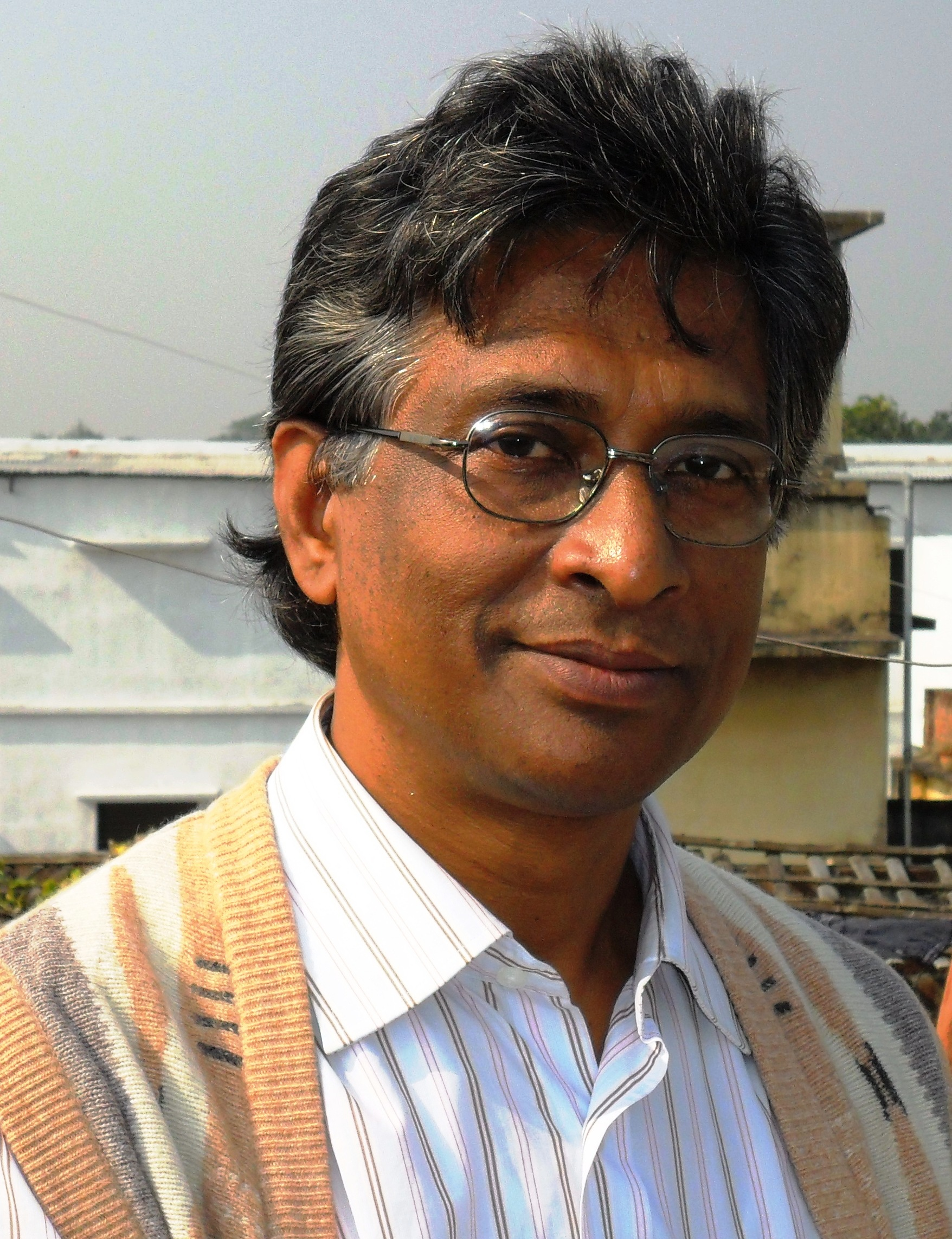
- Occupations: Professor, Writer, Essayist, Lexicographer
- Writing career
- Language: Bengali, English
- Notable works: Evolutionary Bengali Dictionary, Bangla Academy Practical Bengali Dictionary, Kabigan: Itihas O Rupantor, In '71 at Bagerhat
- Notable awards: Bangla Academy Literary Award (2019); University Grants Commission Award; Mahakabi Madhusudan Medal

Swarochish Sarkar (born 1959) is a Bangladeshi lexicographer and grammarian. He is one of the authors and editors of the Bangla Academy Standard Bengali Grammar. Among the dictionaries he has edited, the Bangla Academy Practical Bengali Dictionary and the Bangla Academy Evolutionary Bengali Dictionary are notable. He is currently serving as a professor at the Institute of Bangladesh Studies, a research institute of Rajshahi University. From July 2015 to July 2018, he served as the director of this institute.

== Biography ==
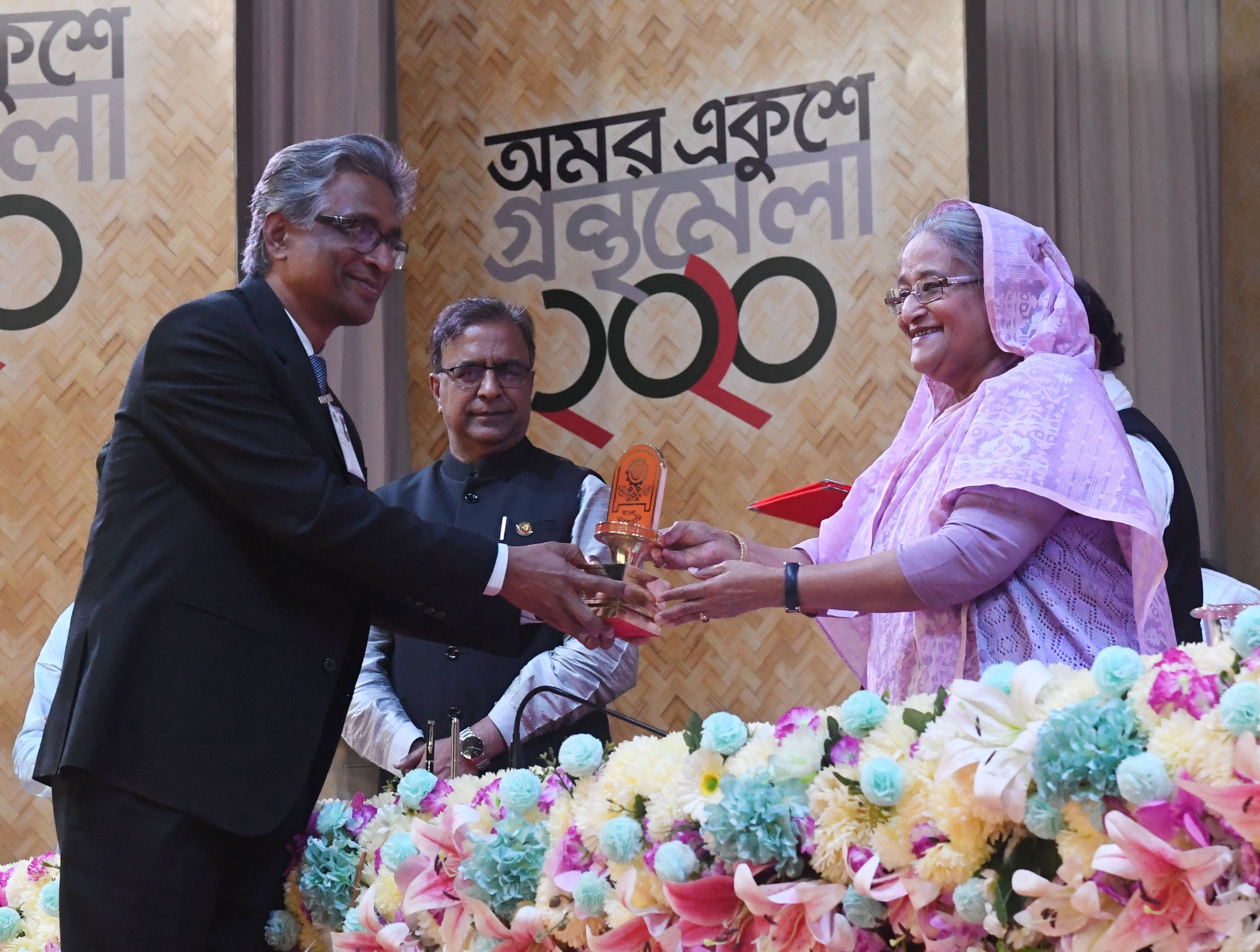
Sarkar receiving 2019 Bangla Academy Literary Award

Swarochish Sarkar was born in the village of Charbaniyari in Chitalmari Upazila of Bagerhat District. As an officer of Bangla Academy (1992–2000), he edited manuscripts of many important books. Since 2001, he has served as the associate editor (2001 to 2013) and editor (2014 to 2020) of the research journal Institute of Bangladesh Studies Journal, published in both Bengali and English.

== Published works ==
For his research-based book Asprishyata Bishoye Rabindranath (Rabindranath on Untouchability), the University Grants Commission of Bangladesh honored him with the University Grants Commission Award in 2005. In 2013, for his research work on Kavigan (folk verse performance) titled Kabigan: Itihas O Rupantor (Kavigan: History and Transformation), he received the Madhusudan Medal. In 2014, the Bangla Academy Evolutionary Bengali Dictionary, jointly edited with Ghulam Murshid, was recognized as a widely discussed dictionary and acknowledged as a historic work.

His published books are as follows:

=== Collection of essays ===
- Mukundadas (Biography book, Dhaka: Bangla Academy)
- Jogeshchandra Bagal (Biography book, Dhaka: Bangla Academy)
- Girishchandra Barua (Biography book, Dhaka: Bangla Academy)
- Bangladesher Foshhol (Crops of Bangladesh)
- Kothasahitya O Natoke Muslim Songskarchetana (Muslim Reformist Consciousness in Fiction and Drama)
- Mahmud Nurul Huda (Biography book, Dhaka: Bangla Academy)
- Asprishyota Bishoye Rabindranath (Dhaka: Protikh Prokashona Songstha; revised edition Dhaka: Kothaprokash) — Rabindranath on Untouchability
- Ekattore Bagerhat: Bangladesher Muktijuddher Ancholik Itihash (Dhaka: Sahitya Bilash; revised edition Dhaka: Kothaprokash) — Bagerhat in 1971: Regional History of Bangladesh’s Liberation War
- Bish Shotoker Muktachinta (Dhaka: Protikh Prokashona Songstha; revised edition Dhaka: Mothers Publications) — Free Thought of the Twentieth Century
- Bhabna Niye Bhabna: Jonopriyo Boi-er Alochona (Dhaka: Sahitya Bilash; revised edition Dhaka: Mothers Publications) — Thoughts on Thoughts: Discussion on Popular Books
- Bangladesher Koshgrontho O Shobdosondhan (Dhaka: Bangla Academy) — Dictionaries and Word Research in Bangladesh
- Akaron Byakoron (Dhaka: Shovaprakash; revised edition Dhaka: Kothaprokash) — Unnecessary Grammar
- Kobigan: Itihash O Rupantor (Dhaka: Bangla Academy) — Kobigan: History and Transformation
- Sorbostore Bangla Bhasha: Akangkha O Bastobota (Dhaka: Kothaprokash) — Bengali Language in All Spheres: Aspiration and Reality
- Bangla Bhashay Uchchosikkha: Prottasha O Ontoray (Dhaka: Kothaprokash) — Higher Education in Bengali: Expectations and Obstacles
- Puran-e Nodi (Dhaka: Mothers Publications) — Rivers in the Puranas
- Bangladeshe Vidyasagar Charcha (Dhaka: Mothers Publications) — Study of Vidyasagar in Bangladesh
- Bangabandhu O Bangla Bhasha (Dhaka: Bangla Academy) — Bangabandhu and Bengali Language
- Musolman Lekhokder Samajbhabna: 1869–1947 (Revised edition of the book 'Kothasahitya O Natoke Muslim Songskarchetana', Dhaka: Mothers Publications) — Social Thoughts of Muslim Writers: 1869–1947
- Nirbachito Gobeshona-Prabandho (Dhaka: Tangan) — Selected Research Essays

=== Edited volume ===
- Bangla Academy Boishakhi Lok-Utsob Prabandho (Dhaka: Bangla Academy) — Bangla Academy Baishakhi Folk Festival Essays
- Bangla Academy Shohoj Bangla Abhidhan (Shohojogi Shampadok, Dhaka: Bangla Academy) — Bangla Academy Easy Bengali Dictionary (Associate Editor)
- Bangla Academy Songkhipto Bangla Abhidhan (Shohojogi Shampadok, Dhaka: Bangla Academy) — Bangla Academy Concise Bengali Dictionary (Associate Editor)
- Bangla Academy Byaboharik Bangla Abhidhan (Shohojogi Shampadok, Dhaka: Bangla Academy) — Bangla Academy Practical Bengali Dictionary (Associate Editor)
- Pali-Bangla Abhidhan, Dui Khondo (Dhaka: Bouddho Dhormiyo Kalyan Trust) — Pali-Bengali Dictionary, Two Volumes
- Bangla Academy English-Bangla Abhidhan (Shohojogi Shampadok, Dhaka: Bangla Academy) — Bangla Academy English-Bengali Dictionary (Associate Editor)
- Kusume Kusume Choronchihno: Mofizuddin Ahmad Smarakgrontho (Shohojogi Shampadok, Rajshahi) — In Every Flower, Footprints: Mofizuddin Ahmad Memorial Volume (Associate Editor)
- Janmo Jodi Tobo Bonge: Sarwar Jahan Smarakgrontho (Shohojogi Shampadok, Rajshahi) — If You Were Born in Bengal: Sarwar Jahan Memorial Volume (Associate Editor)
- Pritikumar Mitra Smarakgrontho (Rajshahi: IBS, Rajshahi University) — Pritikumar Mitra Memorial Volume
- Bish Shotoker Bangla (Rajshahi: IBS, Rajshahi University) — Bengali of the Twentieth Century
- Bangla Academy Promito Bangla Bhashar Byakoron, Dui Khondo (Shohojogi Shampadok, Dhaka: Bangla Academy) — Bangla Academy Standard Bengali Grammar, Two Volumes (Associate Editor)
- Bongo Bangla Bangladesh: Sanat Kumar Saha Shommananagrontho (Shohojogi Shampadok, Dhaka: Somoy Prokashon) — Bengal, Bengali, Bangladesh: Sanat Kumar Saha Felicitation Volume (Associate Editor)
- Bangla Academy Bibortonmulok Bangla Abhidhan, Tin Khondo (Shohojogi Shampadok, Dhaka: Bangla Academy) — Bangla Academy Evolutionary Bengali Dictionary, Three Volumes (Associate Editor)
- Jagoron O Abhyudoy (Rajshahi: IBS, Rajshahi University) — Awakening and Rise
- Bangladesher Bhashaniti O Bhasha-porikolpona (Rajshahi: IBS, Rajshahi University) — Language Policy and Planning in Bangladesh
- Bangladesher Adibashi Jatisottar Atmoporichoy (Rajshahi: IBS, Rajshahi University) — Self-Identity of Indigenous Ethnicities of Bangladesh
- Bangali Jatiborner Utsho Shondhan: Nomoshudro Poundrakshatriya Kaibortho Rajbongshi (Dhaka: Mothers Publications) — Searching the Roots of Bengali Castes: Namasudra, Poundrakshatriya, Kaibarta, Rajbanshi
- Golam Morshed Songbordhona Grontho (Dhaka: Kothaprokash) — Golam Morshed Felicitation Volume
- Bangla Bhashar Byakoron O Nirmiti, Nobom-Doshom Sreni (Dhaka: National Curriculum and Textbook Board) — Grammar and Structure of Bengali Language, Ninth–Tenth Grade
- Bengali, Sixth Grade Textbook (Dhaka: National Curriculum and Textbook Board)
- Bengali, Seventh Grade Textbook (Dhaka: National Curriculum and Textbook Board)
- Bengali, Eighth Grade Textbook (Dhaka: National Curriculum and Textbook Board)
- Bengali, Ninth Grade Textbook (Dhaka: National Curriculum and Textbook Board)
- Byaboharik Bangla (Gazipur: National University Publication Series, Bangladesh) — Practical Bengali
- Guruchand Thakur Smarakgrontho (Dhaka: Rayprokash) — Guruchand Thakur Memorial Volume

=== Translation book ===
- Purbo Banglar Bhumi Byabostha (Dhaka: University Press Limited) — Land System of East Bengal
- Bangla Bhashar Bornona: Ekti Bikalpo Byakoron (Dhaka: Bangla Academy) — Description of Bengali Language: An Alternative Grammar

=== Transcription book ===
- Mahmud Nurul Huda: Amar Jibon Smriti (Dhaka: Bangla Academy) — Mahmud Nurul Huda: My Life Memoir
