= Shihab Sarkar =

Bangladeshi poet and novelist

Poet Shihab Sarkar
- শিহাব সরকার
- Born: 2 March 1952 (age 74): East Pakistani (1952–1971); Bangladeshi (1971–Present)
- Education: University of Dhaka
- Occupation: Poet
- Awards: Bangla Academy Literary Award (2014)

Shihab Sarkar is a Bangladeshi poet, journalist, and writer. In 2014, Sarkar won the Bangla Academy Literary Award in the poetry category, recognizing his contributions to contemporary Bangla literature.

== Background and career ==
Shihab Sarkar was born on 2 March 1952 in Azimpur, Dhaka, in East Pakistan (now Bangladesh). His grandfather's village was Nabinagar, Brahmanbaria. He completed his higher education at the University of Dhaka, where he studied English literature.

== Works ==
Notable Poems

- Marilyn Oi Je Guha
- Laljoubondin
- Joy Hobe Dirghoshwashe
- Koro Gaan Bon Jyotsnay
- Tomar Khotriya
