= MA Hasan =

Bangladeshi physician and activist (born 1950)

- Born: March 14, 1950 (age 76); Bagerhat District
- Occupations: physician, human rights activist and genocide researcher
- Awards: Bangla Academy Literary Award (2016)

MA Hasan is a Bangladeshi physician, human rights activist and genocide researcher. In recognition of his contributions to the literature on the liberation war, he was awarded Bangla Academy Literary Award in 2016.

He is the Convener of War Crimes Fact Finding Committee.

== Early life ==
Hasan was born on 14 March 1950 at Bagerhat District of the then East Pakistan (now Bangladesh).

== Awards ==
- Bangla Academy Literary Award (2016)
