= Khondokar Sirajul Haque =

Bangladeshi researcher and professor

- খোন্দকার সিরাজুল হক
- Born: 1 March 1941
- Died: 6 April 2016 (aged 74)
- Education: Master of Arts (Bengali)
- Alma mater: University of Rajshahi
- Awards: Bangla Academy Literary Award (2012)

Khondokar Sirajul Haque (1941–2016) was a Bangladeshi literary researcher. He worked on modern Bengali literature. His research on the Muslim Sahitya Samaj of Dhaka, a literary movement in the early 20th century, contributed to academic understanding of that era. He received the Sadat Ali Akhand Award and the Bangla Academy Literary Award for his contributions to literary research.

== Early life ==
Khondokar Sirajul Haque was born on 1 March 1941 in Rajshahi, Bangladesh. He completed his Master of Arts (M.A.) in Bengali literature from the University of Rajshahi in 1964, securing first class first position. He received his Ph.D. in 1982.

== Career ==
After teaching for a short period at Michael Madhusudan College in Jessore, Khondokar Sirajul Haque joined the Department of Bengali at the University of Rajshahi as a lecturer in 1965. He served in the department until his retirement in 2006.

== Death ==
Sirajul Haque died at 6:00 p.m. on 6 April 2016 at Rajshahi Medical College Hospital, after being on life support for three months due to a cerebral hemorrhage.
