= Akhtar Hossain =

Bangladeshi children's writer (1945–2026)

- আখতার হুসেন
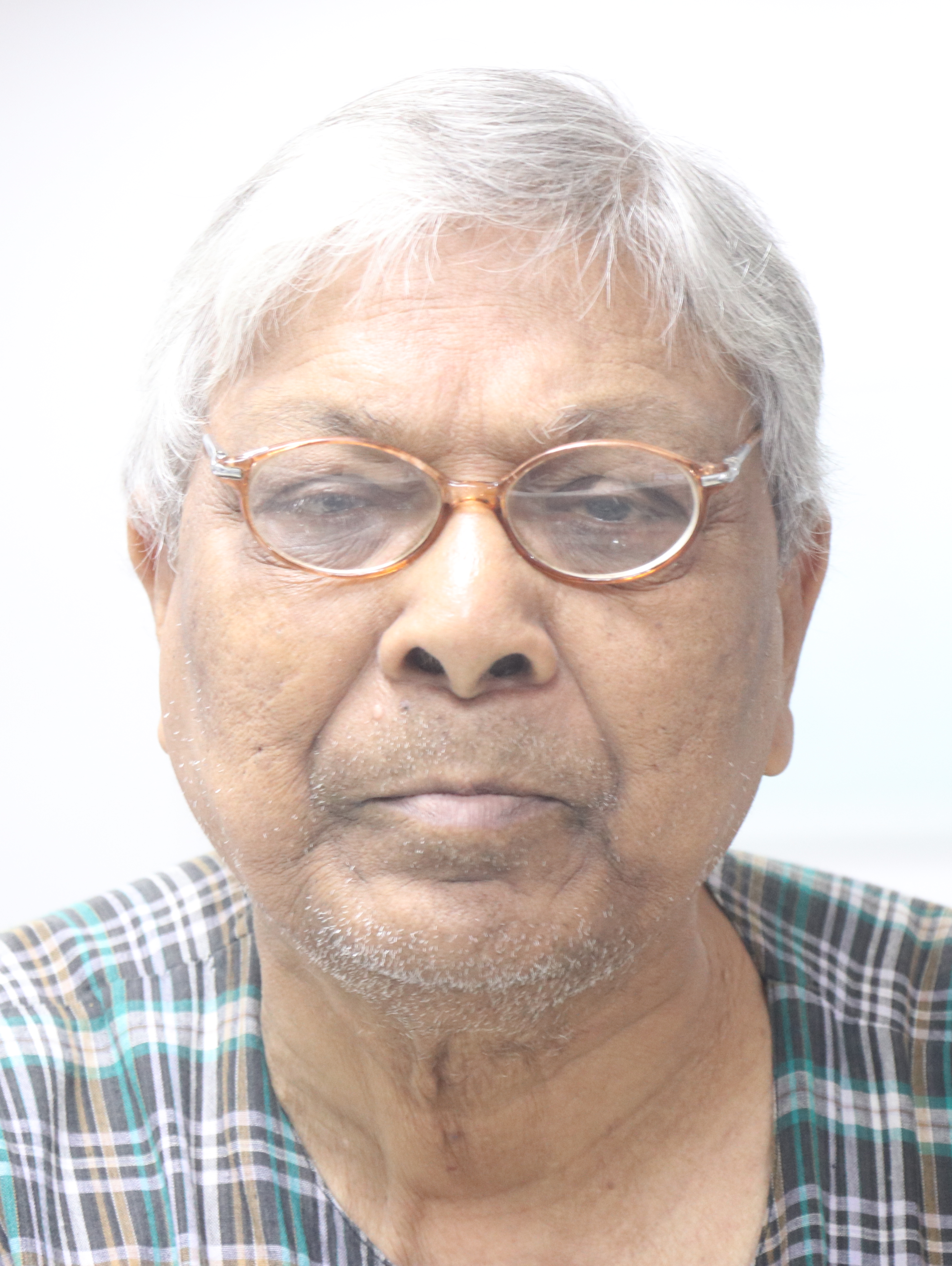
- Born: 1 November 1945; Natore, Bengal Province, British India
- Died: 24 September 2026 (aged 80); Dhaka, Bangladesh
- Occupation: Children's literature writer
- Writing career
- Genre: Children's literature
- Notable awards: Bangla Academy Literary Award, 2012

Akhtar Hossain (Bengali: আখতার হুসেন; 1 November 1945 – 24 September 2026) was a Bangladeshi children's literature writer. He was awarded the Bangla Academy Literary Award and the Agrani Bank Shishu Academy Children's Literature Award in 2012, for his contributions to children's literature.

== Background ==
Akhtar Hossain was born in Nurullapur village of Lalpur Upazila, Natore District. His father's name was T.I.M. Sikandar, and his mother was Ayesha Khatun.

Hossain died on 24 September 2026, at the age of 80.

== Awards ==
- Bangla Academy Literary Award (2012)
- Agrani Bank Shishu Academy Children's Literature Award (2012)
- Kabir Chowdhury Children's Literature Award (2015)
