= Zobeda Khanum =

Bangladeshi educationist and litterateur

- Born: March 5, 1920; Baniakandi, Kumarkhali Thana, British Bengal (now Bangladesh)
- Died: January 26, 1989 (aged 68)
- Education: University of Dhaka

Zobeda Khanum (5 March 1920 – 26 January 1989) was an educationist and litterateur of Bangladesh. She was the first director and chairperson of Bangladesh Shishu Academy. She also served as vice chairperson and later chairperson of Bangladesh Mahila Samity.

== Early life ==
Khanum was born at Baniakandi in Kumarkhali Thana on 5 March 1920. His father Khandkar Azharul Islam was a school inspector. She started her primary education from a home tutor. After getting married she moved to Kolkata, where she appeared privately in the Matriculation, IA and BT examinations. She obtained a master's degree from University of Dhaka in 1950.

== Literary works ==
Khanum wrote in several genres: novels, short stories, plays and juvenile literature.

=== Novels ===
- Abhishapta Prem (1959)
- Duti Ankhi Duti Tara (1963)
- Akasher Rang (1964)
- Banamarmar (1967)
- Ananta Pipasa (1967)

=== Short stories ===
- Ekti Surer Mrtyu (1974) (compilation)
- Jiban Ekti Durghatana (1981) (compilation)

=== Plays ===
- Jhader Svaksar (1967)
- Ore Bihanga (1968)

=== Juvenile literature ===
- Galpa Bali Shona (1966)
- Mahasamudra (1977)
- Sabas Sultana (1982)

== Awards ==
- Agrani Bank Award for Juvenile Literature
- Ekushey Padak (2003)
