= Al Mujahidi =

Bangladeshi poet (1943–2026)

- আল মুজাহিদী
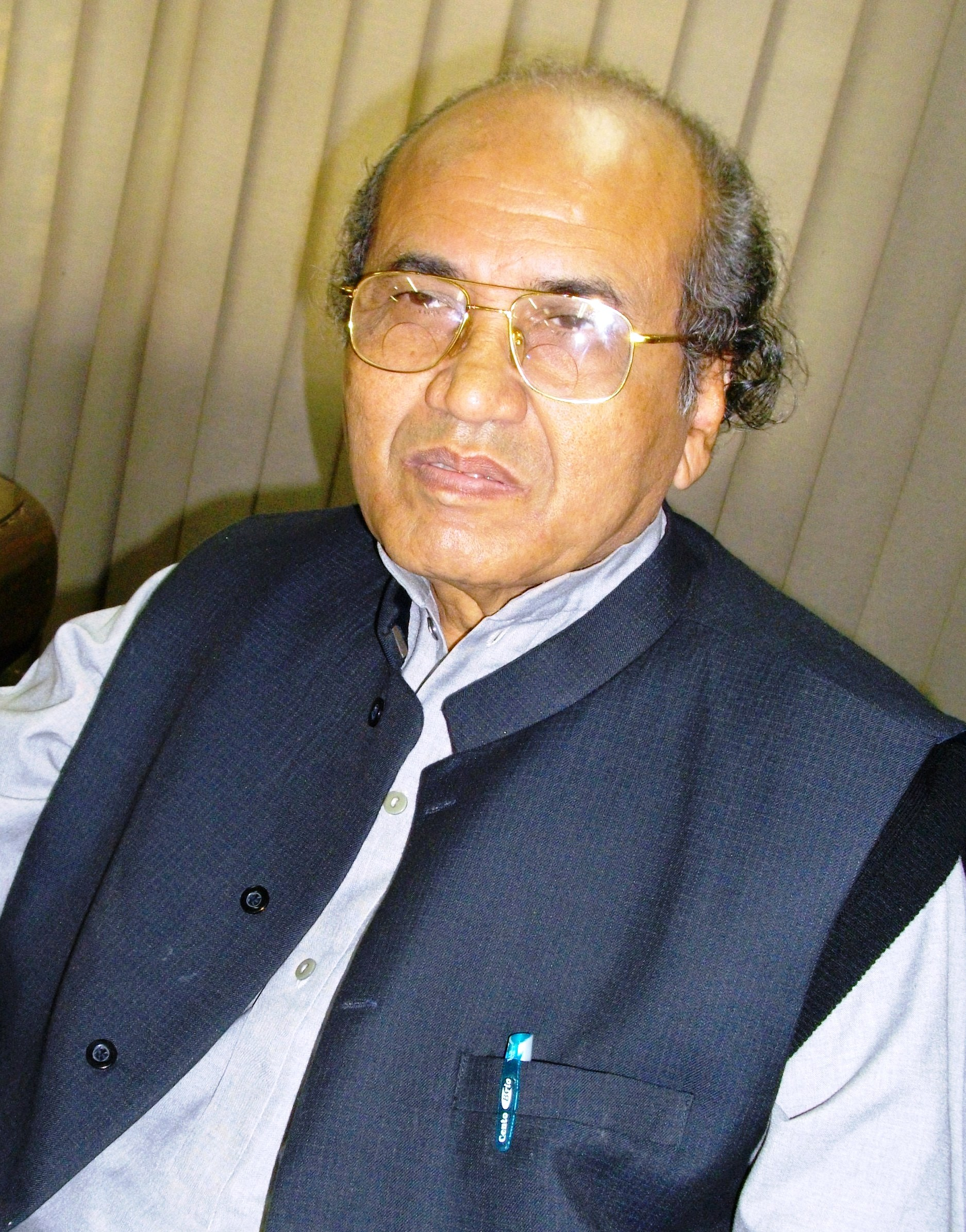
- Born: 1 January 1943
- Died: 18 June 2026 (aged 83); Dhaka, Bangladesh
- Occupation: Poet

Al Mujahidi (1 January 1943 – 18 June 2026) was a Bangladeshi poet. He was awarded Ekushey Padak in 2003 by the Government of Bangladesh for his contribution to literature.

== Career ==
Mujahidi started publishing poems in 1952 and as of 2004 had published 52 books of poems. He was the literary editor of The Daily Ittefaq.

In March 2019, Mujahidi attended a memorial meeting in Dhaka recalling the life and works of the poet Al Mahmud.

== Personal life and death ==
Mujahidi was born on 1 January 1943.

In July 2014, Mujahidi was hospitalised due to diabetes and high blood pressure. He died in Dhaka on 18 June 2026, at the age of 83.
