= Nazim Uddin Mostan =

Bangladeshi journalist

- নাজিম উদ্দিন মোস্তান
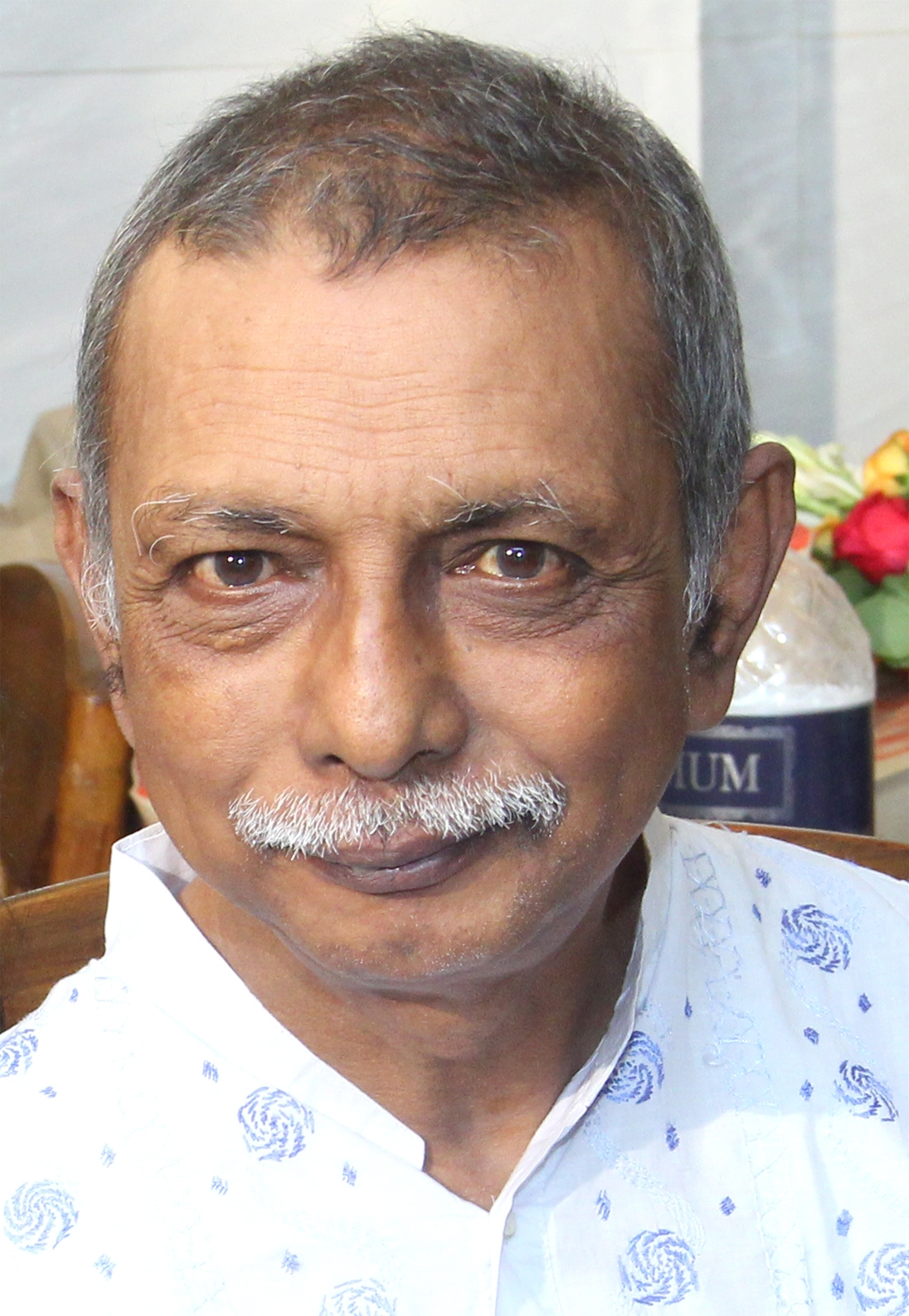
- Born: September 11, 1948; Chandpur District, East Bengal, Dominion of Pakistan
- Died: August 18, 2013 (aged 64); Dhaka, Bangladesh
- Education: University of Dhaka
- Occupation: journalist

Nazim Uddin Mostan (September 11, 1948 – August 18, 2013) was a Bangladeshi journalist. He was a former chief reporter of The Daily Ittefaq until 1998. He was awarded Ekushey Padak in 2003 by the Government of Bangladesh for his contribution to journalism.

== Education and career ==
Mostan completed his bachelor's from University of Dhaka in 1979. He started his journalism career in the late 1960s. He worked at The Sangbad and Daily Paygam.

== Awards ==
- Ekushey Padak (2003)
- Bangladesh Computer Samity Award (2003)
