= Bangladesh Shishu Academy =

Academy for children in Bangladesh

- বাংলাদেশ শিশু একাডেমি; Bāṅlādēś Śiśu Ēkāḍēmi
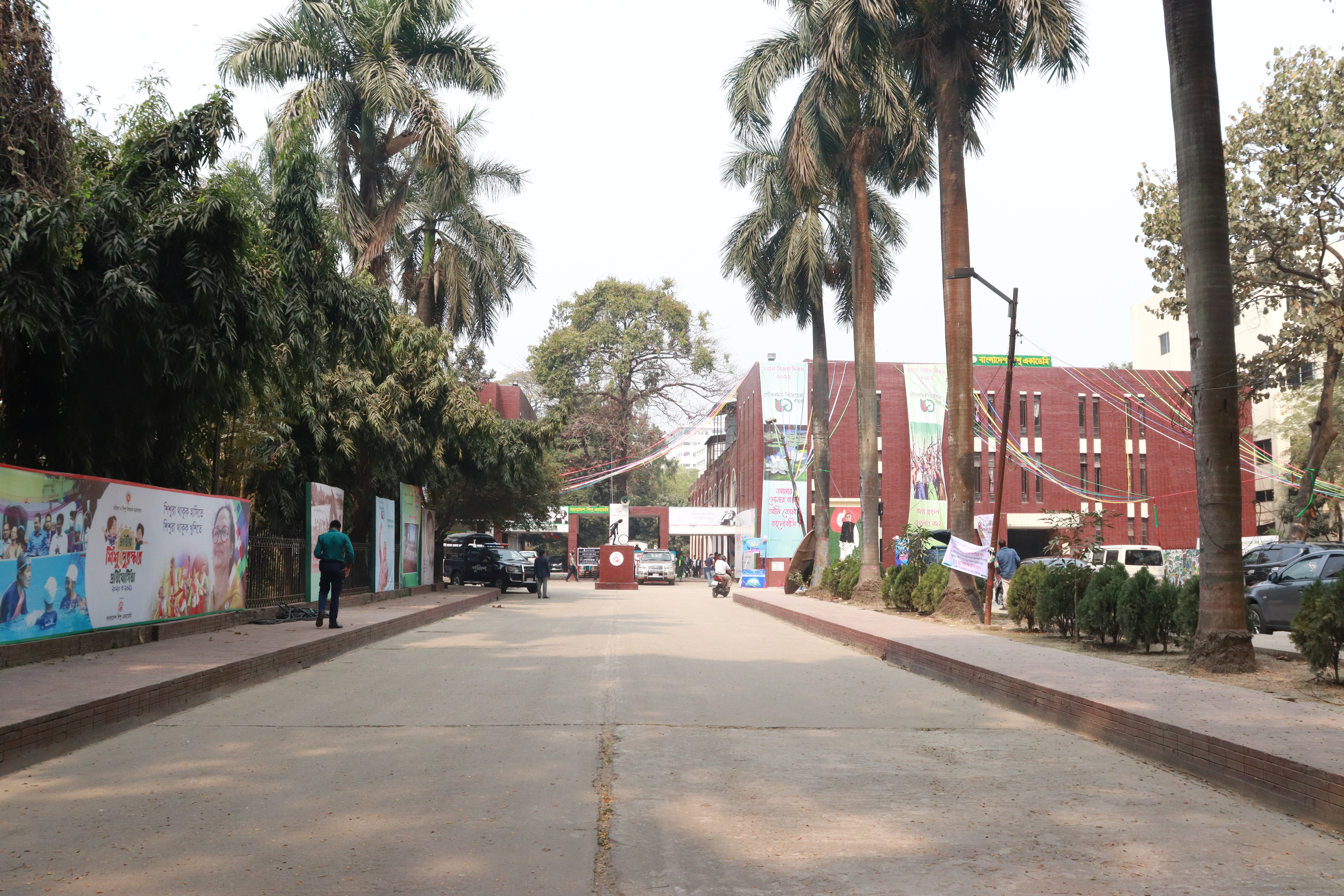
- Entry of Bangladesh Shishu Academy
- Pronunciation: ˈbaŋlaˌdeʃ ʃiʃu ekaˌɖemi
- Formation: 1976
- Location: Dhaka, Bangladesh
- Coordinates: 23.7290°N 90.4008°E
- Region served: Bangladesh
- Chairperson: Dilara Begum
- Parent organization: Ministry of Women and Children Affairs
- Website: shishuacademy.gov.bd

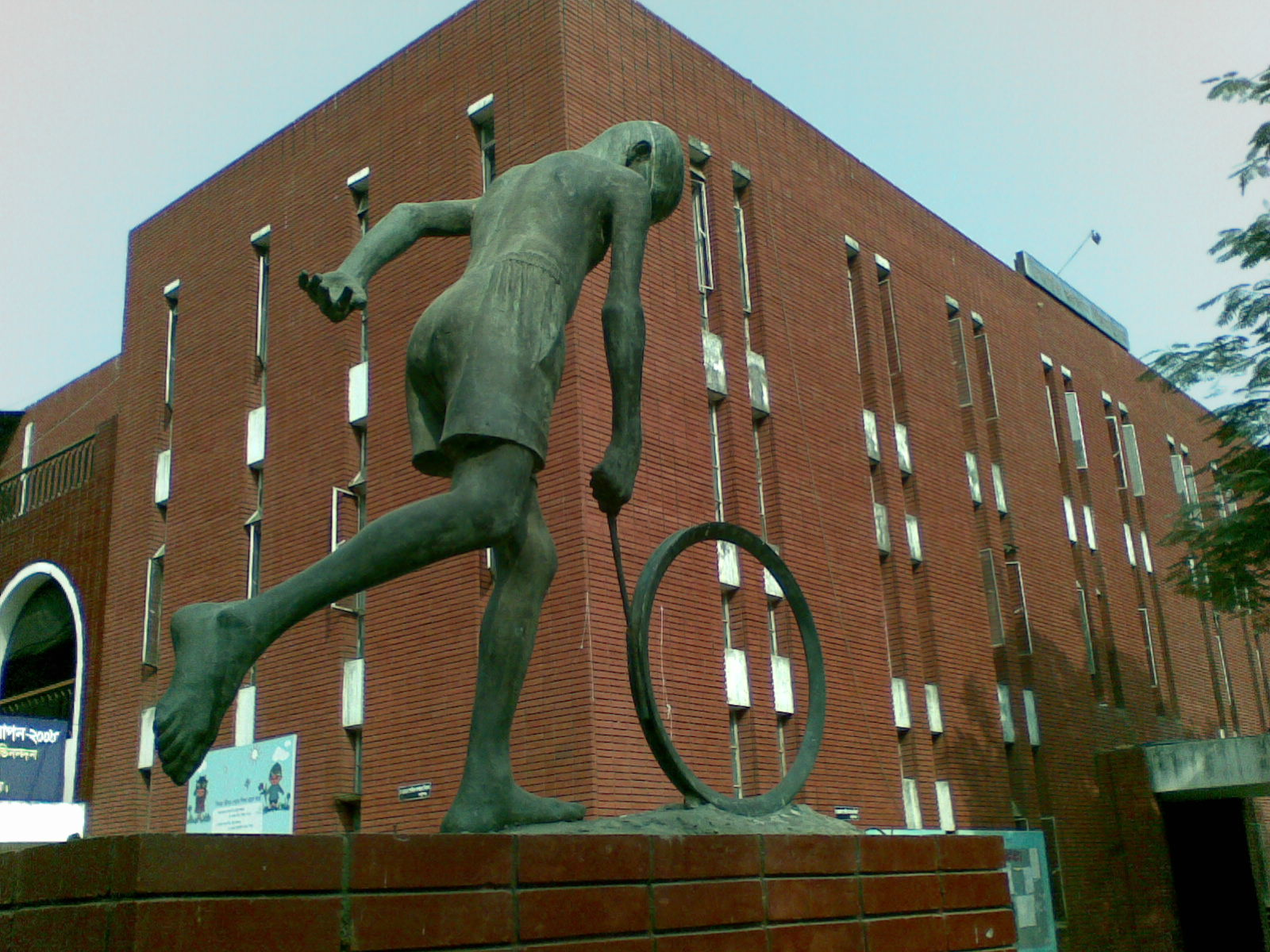
Duronto, sculpture of a playing child, on Shishu Academy premises

Bangladesh Shishu Academy (Bengali: বাংলাদেশ শিশু একাডেমি) is the national academy for children in Bangladesh. It was established in 1976 by Ziaur Rahman for promoting cultural development of children, and nurturing their talents.

On 8 August 2024, after the overthrow of Sheikh Hasina, the main building along with the sculpture Duronto was burnt.

The school gives out the Agrani Bank Shishu Academy Children's Literature Award.

== List of Chairpersons ==
- Zobeda Khanum
- Zubaida Gulshan Ara
- Sheikh Abdul Ahad
- Selina Hossain (23 April 2014 – 2018)
- Lucky Enam (25 September 2019 – present)

== See also ==
- Culture of Bangladesh
- Bangla Academy
- National Child Award
