= Udayan Higher Secondary School =

Location
- 3/3 Fuller Road; Dhaka University Campus; Dhaka 1000; Bangladesh
- 23.7294°N 90.3925°E

Information
- Type: Private school
- Motto: Read in the name of your lord
- Established: 1955
- School district: Dhaka
- Principal: Muhammad Arifur Rahman
- Faculty: 60
- Grades: KG-12th
- Enrollment: 3000 (est.)
- Language: Bengali and English
- Campus size: 30,000 square feet (0.69 acres)
- Campus type: Suburban
- Colors: Monogram; Red and white Uniform; White and Navy blue
- Newspaper: Udayan Bulletin
- Website: udayan.edu.bd

Udayan Higher Secondary School Dhaka, formerly known as Udayan Bidyalaya is a private higher secondary school in Bangladesh, established in 1955 by the University of Dhaka. It is a co-educational institution.

The school was first allotted a small piece of land and two sheds. With the increase in the number of students it was upgraded to a secondary school and, after independence of Bangladesh, as a higher secondary one. In 1976, it received formal recognition from the Dhaka Board of Intermediate and Secondary Education.

In 1980, it applied for a larger space and Dhaka University donated an area of 30,000 sq ft (2,800 m^{2}) not far from its original location on Fuller Road. Construction of the new five-storied building was completed in 1987. Although established with donations from University of Dhaka, the school enjoys the status of a private organisation.

The school conducts co-education programmes and in 1999, had 60 teachers (44 women), 14 other staff, and 2,030 students of whom 935 were girls. It is equipped with computer labs, science labs and library. It takes part in scout and girls guide activities and in serving distressed people in situations of flood or other natural calamity. The school boasts of a band group of its own and performs in sports, cultural shows, science fairs and debating competitions. In 1998, it introduced intermediate level programmes with courses in business studies and science, and was upgraded to a school and college, and took its name as Udayan Higher Secondary School.

== History ==
Udayan Bidyalaya started in June 1955.. At that time it was not called "Udayan Bidyalaya," instead it was known as "Dhaka English Preparatory School." From 1955 until 1992, it was located on the land next to the Vice-Chancellor's house of Dhaka University.

The Dhaka English Preparatory school started functioning when menials quarters attached to the residence of the vice-chancellor were renovated. After additions and alterations, the school started functioning. The land and the renovated semi-constructed building were leased out to the school on a nominal rent of taka ten per month.

The syndicate of Dhaka University in a meeting held on 31 May 1969 granted permission to the school to construct another story on the school building. The university gave permission to change the name of Dhaka English Preparatory school as Udayan Bidyalaya and also to its upgrading as a high school.

The Government of Bangladesh, on 31 October 1980, approved the managing committee for the Bidyalaya under rule 20(2) of the Managing Committee Regulations of 1977. The Dhaka Education Board installed the first such committee by an official order in November 1980 and the second such committee on 25 January 1984.

On 14 March 1986, the foundation of the five-storied new building was inaugurated by the former Vice-Chancellor of Dhaka University, Prof. Abdul Mannan Choudhury. In 1991, the school received the award of the best school in the country. On 13 November 1991, the students had their first class day in the new building. However, in 1992, the school physically moved to its new five storied building located at 3/3 Fullar Road near Salimullah Muslim Hall of Dhaka University.

In 1997 the school opened its Higher Secondary Program and renamed as Udayan Higher Secondary School.

== Gallery ==
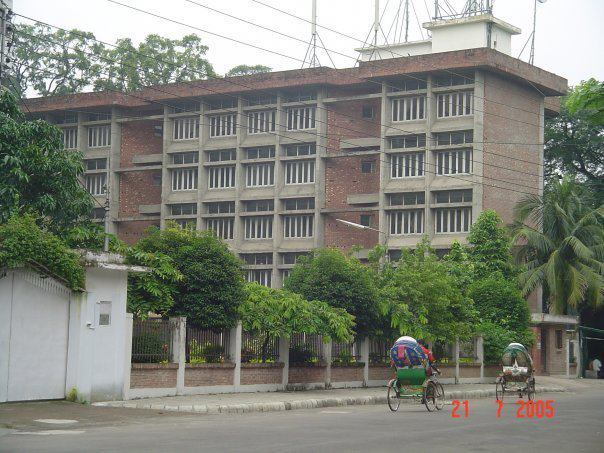

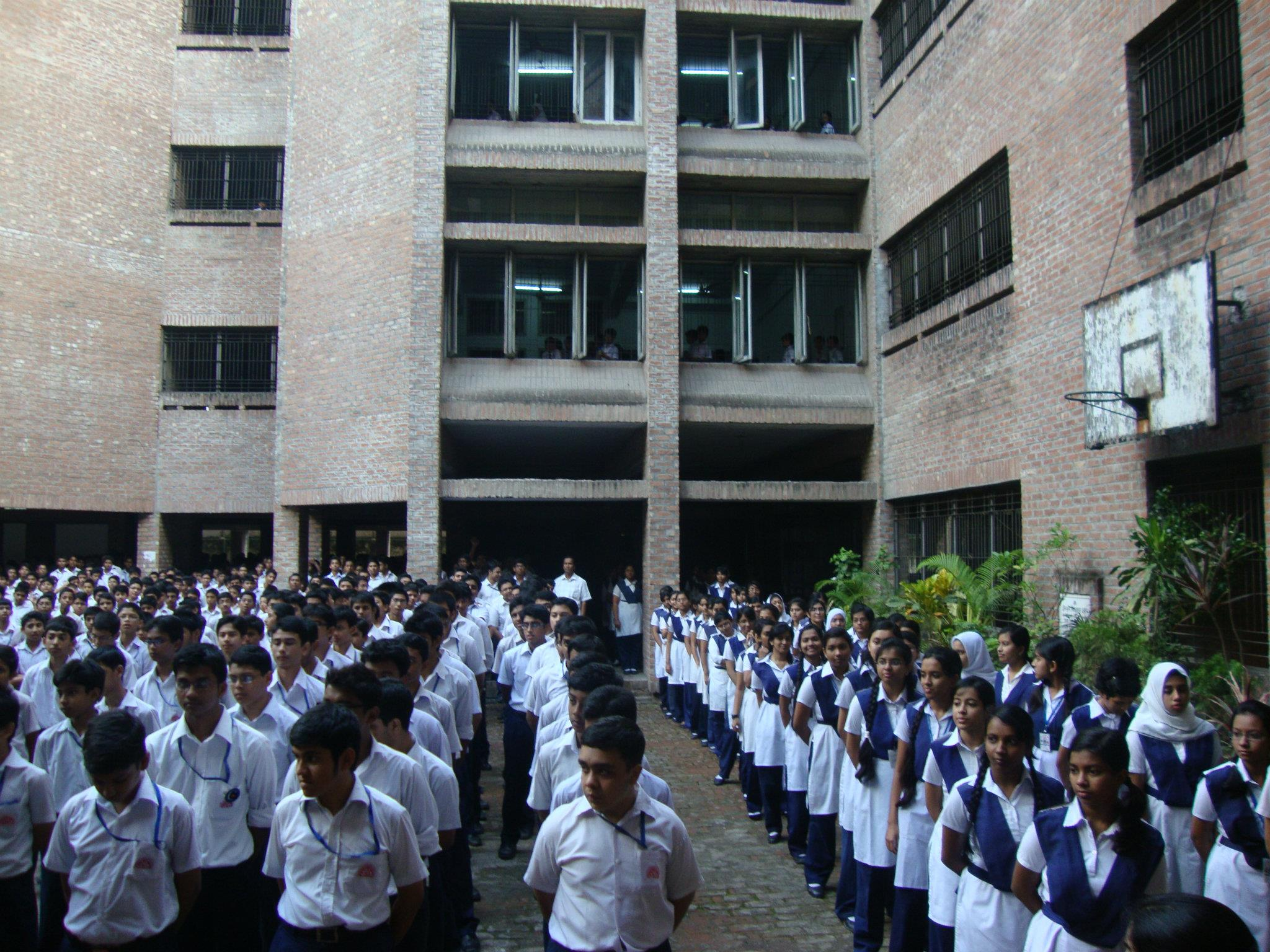

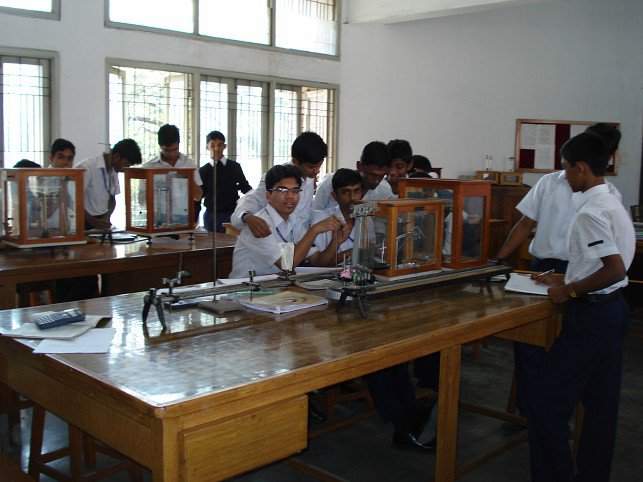

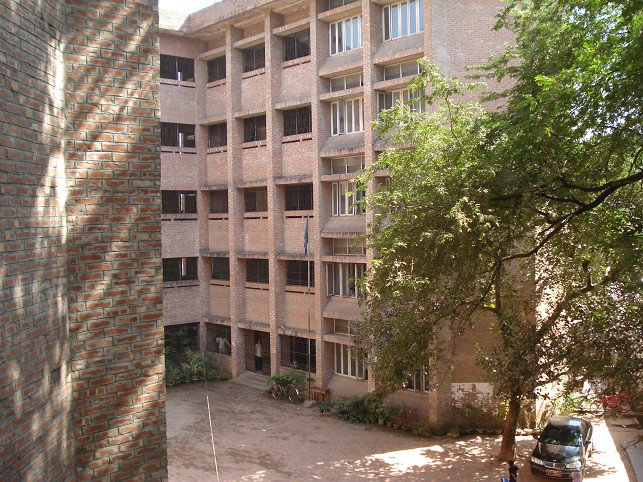

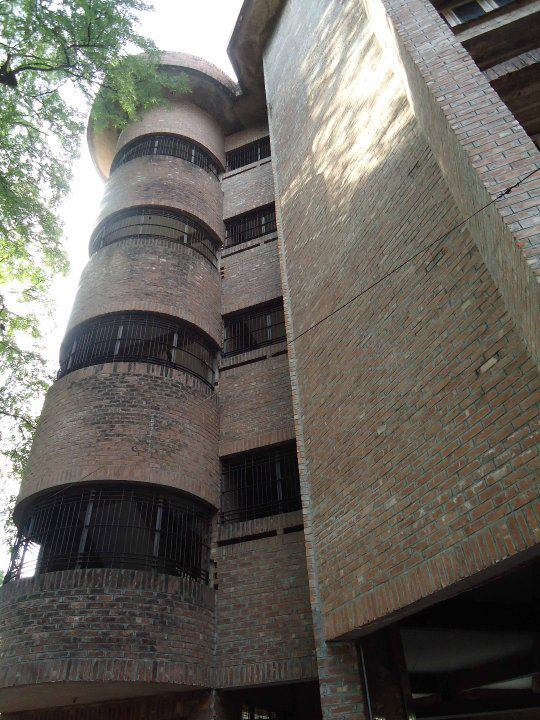
