= Morshed Shafiul Hasan =

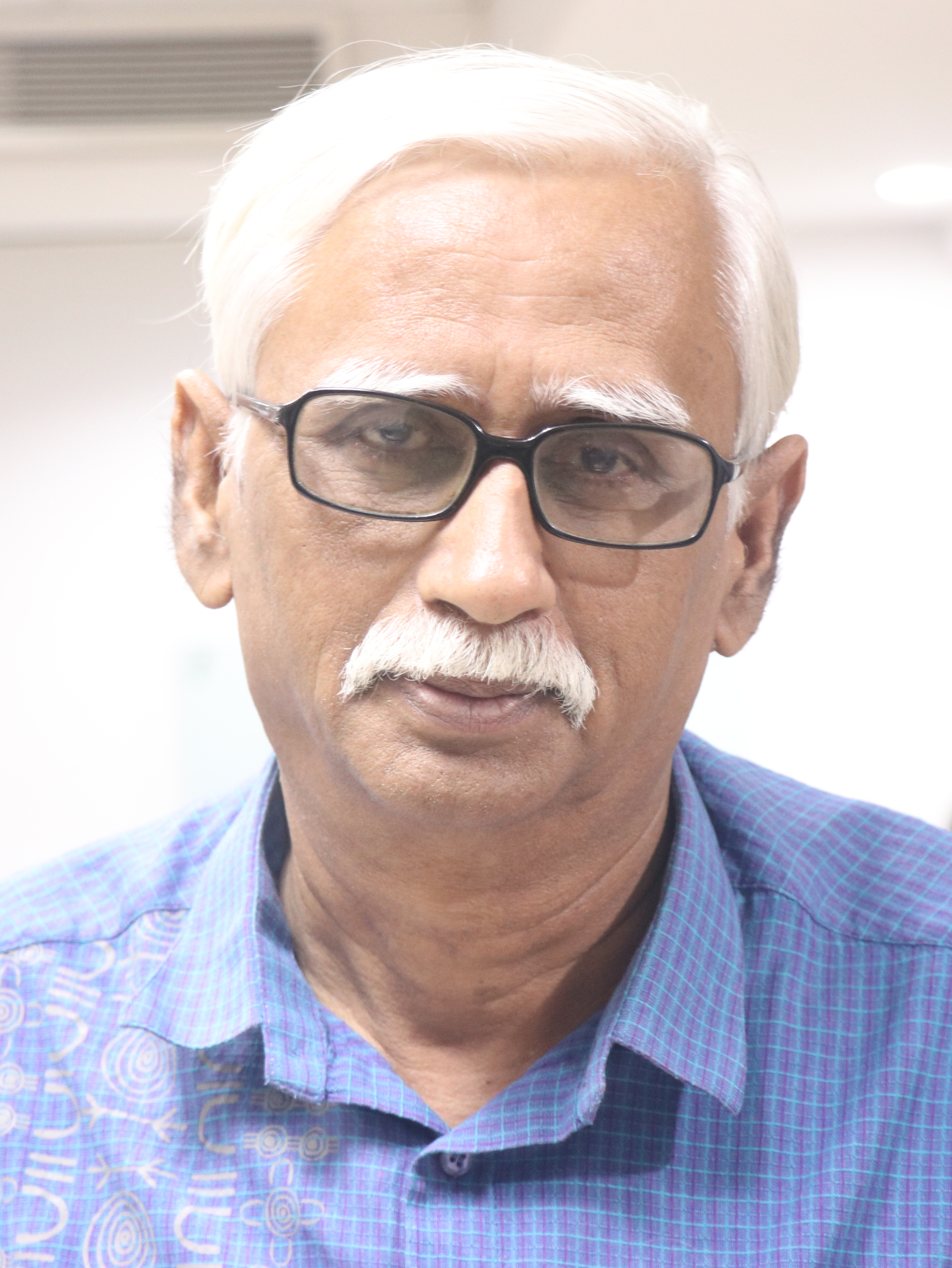
- Born: 21 March 1953 (age 73); Chattogram
- Citizenship: Bangladesh
- Education: University of Dhaka
- Occupations: Teacher, writer
- Known for: Essayist, researcher, critic, and poet
- Office: Prothoma
- Awards: Bangla Academy Literary Award, 2016

Morshed Shafiul Hasan (born 21 March 1953) is a Bangladeshi essayist, researcher, critic, and poet. In recognition of his contributions to essays and research, he was awarded the Bangla Academy Literary Award in 2016.

== Early life and family ==
Hasan was born on 21 March 1953 in Chattogram. His father's name was Mohammad Irshad Hossain, and his mother was Begum Syedunnesa.

== Education ==
Hasan studied at Polo Ground Railway School, Chattogram Collegiate School, and Chittagong College. Later, he completed his bachelor's and master's degrees in Bengali language and literature from the University of Dhaka. He also obtained a Ph.D. from the same university.

== Career ==
Hasan began his professional career in journalism. He worked as a university reporter for the daily Sangbad, assistant editor for the dailies Janapad, Gonokantho, and Banglar Bani. He also served as the executive editor of the weekly Uttaran, edited by Ahmed Sofa. In 1984, he joined the government service as a lecturer through the BCS exam and retired in 2011 as the principal of Government Science College, Dhaka.

Besides teaching at various government colleges, Hasan worked with the Directorate of Primary Education and the National Curriculum and Textbook Board. He also taught at Jagannath University. After retirement, he joined Prothom Alo-affiliated publishing house Prothoma as a consultant.

== Literary Contributions ==
Hasan started writing in his school years, primarily composing rhymes and poetry. While studying at university, he wrote Obak Naam Vietnam, a book on the Vietnam War aimed at young readers.

Hasan gained recognition as a prominent researcher on Begum Rokeya Sakhawat Hossain. His first book on Rokeya, titled Begum Rokeya: Somoy O Sahitya, was published in 1982 by Bangla Academy. He later wrote two more books on Rokeya: Rokeya: Kale O Kalottore and Rokeya: Path O Mulyayan.

Hasan has authored more than sixty books, covering essays, research, poetry, novels, translations, children's literature, biographies, popular science, and socio-political analysis. He has also written books under the pseudonyms Hasan Shafi and Shakina Hasin.

== Notable works ==
- Obak Naam Vietnam (2000)
- Islam O Moulobad (1989)
- Dhormo O Dhormer Rajniti (1996)
- Pakistanbad-er Biruddhe (1990)
- Somoyer Mukhomukhi (1994)
- Powder Panchali (1997)
- Rajnitihinotar Rajniti (2001)
- Chhofa Bhai: Amar Dekha Amar Chena (2002)
- Bishwaayon-er Koble Bangla (2008)
- Amazan Oronnoyer Bir (2008)
- Sroter Baire (2011)
- Begum Rokeya: Somoy O Sahitya (1996)
- Rabindranath: Onno Aloy
- Boddhimuktir Day O Dayitto (2013)
- Hinomnotar Bipokkhe (2011)
- Chhoto Der Galileo (2016)
- Bulbul Chowdhury: Tar Shilpo Abhijan (2013)

=== Editorial Works ===
- Ahmed Sofa Smarakgrantha (2003)

== Awards and honors ==
- Bangla Academy Literary Award (2016)
- Ahmed Sofa Literary Award (2016)
