= Sanaul Haque Khan =

- Sanaul
- Citizenship: Bangladesh
- Occupation: Poet
- Writing career
- Period: 20th century
- Genre: Poetry
- Notable awards: Bangla Academy Literary Award (2012)

Sanaul Haque Khan, also spelled Sanaul Haq Khan, is a modern poet in Bengali literature.

== Career ==
Khan started writing in 1967 with Andho Karotali being his first published poem. He is one of the country’s publicity-shy, mystic, reclusive poet had been writing verses of different taste for last five decades. Starting from 1967 he has, so far, composed more than 3000 poems. His recent poems have added a new dimension to his quest for establishing harmonious relationship with the eternity and the ultimate truth guiding the universe. His spiritual voyage as it continues through his creation of extraordinary poems, has made him oblivious about cheap publicity and popularity. In his journey to reach the ultimate truth, he has given more attention and thought to eternal love, compassion and mystic spirituality. He was one of a number of poets who came to prominence in the 1970s. His contemporaries were Abid Azad, and Rudra Muhammad Shahidullah.

Khan is a member of the Bangladesh Sports Press Association.

Khan was awarded the Bangla Academy Literary Award in 2012.
