= 2005 in Bangladesh =

- Centuries: 20th; 21st
- Decades: 1980s; 1990s; 2000s; 2010s; 2020s
- See also: Other events of 2005; List of years in Bangladesh

2005 (MMV) was a common year starting on Saturday of the Gregorian calendar, the 2005th year of the Common Era (CE) and Anno Domini (AD) designations, the 5th year of the 3rd millennium and the 21st century, and the 6th year of the 2000s decade.

The year 2005 was the 34th year after the independence of Bangladesh. It was also the fifth year of the third term of the government of Khaleda Zia.

== Incumbents ==
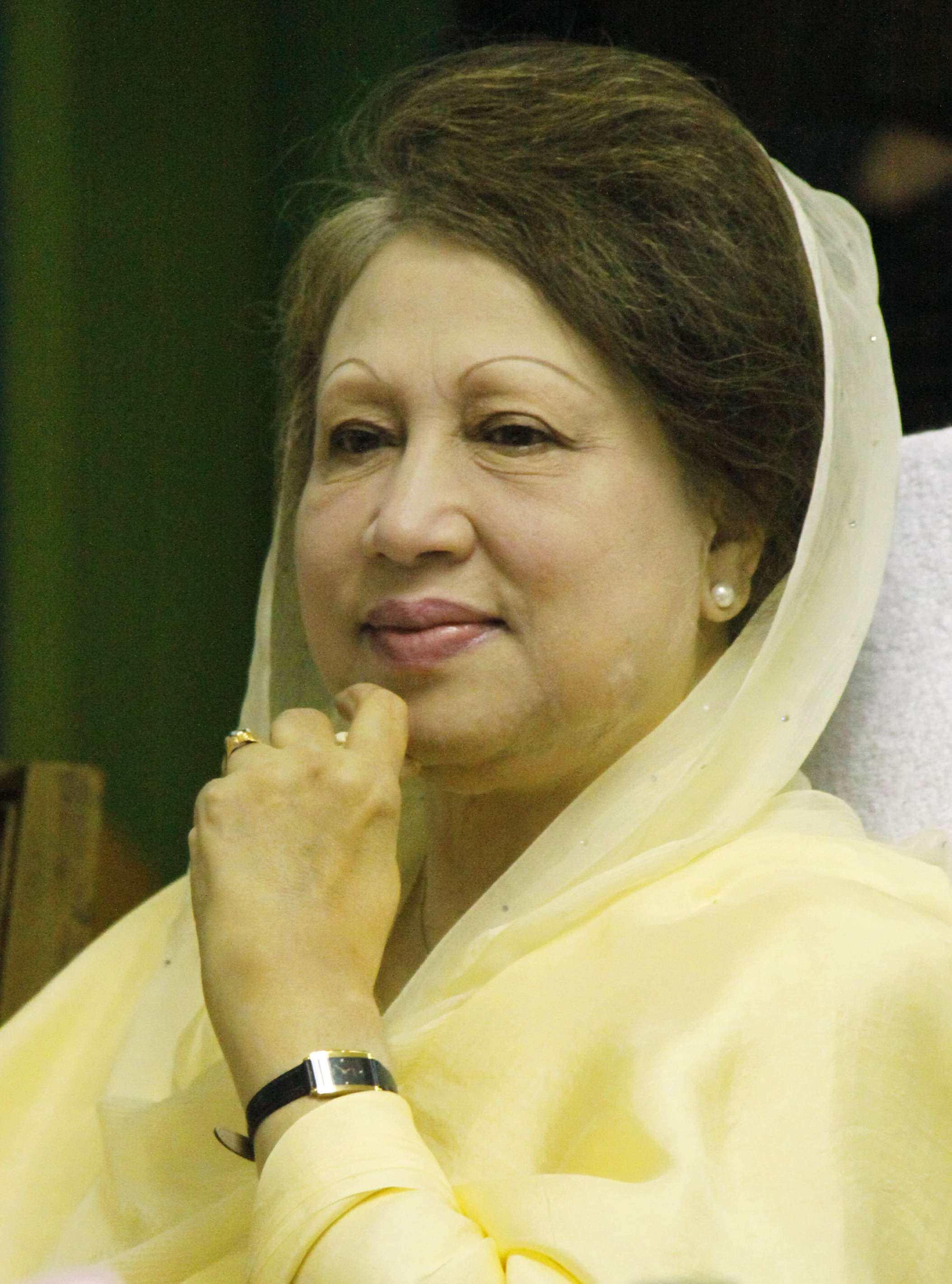
Khaleda
Zia

- President: Iajuddin Ahmed
- Prime Minister: Khaleda Zia
- Chief Justice: Syed Jillur Rahim Mudasser Husain

== Demography ==
Demographic Indicators for Bangladesh in 2005
Population, total	139,035,505
Population density (per km^{2})	1068.1
Population growth (annual %)	1.5%
Male to Female Ratio (every 100 Female)	105.0
Urban population (% of total)	26.8%
Birth rate, crude (per 1,000 people)	24.1
Death rate, crude (per 1,000 people)	6.2
Mortality rate, under 5 (per 1,000 live births)	65
Life expectancy at birth, total (years)	67.8
Fertility rate, total (births per woman)	2.7

== Climate ==
Climate data for Bangladesh in 2005
Month	Jan	Feb	Mar	Apr	May	Jun	Jul	Aug	Sep	Oct	Nov	Dec	Year
Daily mean °C (°F)	18.6 (65.5)	22.0 (71.6)	25.7 (78.3)	28.0 (82.4)	28.2 (82.8)	29.3 (84.7)	28.1 (82.6)	28.4 (83.1)	28.2 (82.8)	26.8 (80.2)	23.1 (73.6)	20.3 (68.5)	25.6 (78.1)
Average precipitation mm (inches)	13.4 (0.53)	7.3 (0.29)	50.8 (2.00)	122.9 (4.84)	229.1 (9.02)	254.5 (10.02)	402.2 (15.83)	232.3 (9.15)	285.1 (11.22)	187.1 (7.37)	1.9 (0.07)	0.9 (0.04)	1,787.5 (70.38)
Source: Climatic Research Unit (CRU) of University of East Anglia (UEA)

== Economy ==
Key Economic Indicators for Bangladesh in 2005
National Income
	Current US$	Current BDT	% of GDP
GDP	$69.4 billion	BDT4.3 trillion	
GDP growth (annual %)	6.5%		
GDP per capita	$499.5	BDT30,717	
Agriculture, value added	$12.9 billion	BDT0.8 trillion	18.6%
Industry, value added	$16.2 billion	BDT1.0 trillion	23.3%
Services, etc., value added	$36.7 billion	BDT2.3 trillion	52.9%
Balance of Payment
	Current US$	Current BDT	% of GDP
Current account balance	-$0.2 billion		-.3%
Imports of goods and services	$14.7 billion	BDT0.9 trillion	20.0%
Exports of goods and services	$10,551.5 million	BDT0.6 trillion	14.4%
Foreign direct investment, net inflows	$813.3 million		1.2%
Personal remittances, received	$4,314.5 million		6.2%
Total reserves (includes gold) at year end	$2,825.0 million		
Total reserves in months of imports	2.2		

Note: For the year 2005 average official exchange rate for BDT was 64.33 per US$.

== Events ==
- 7 January - There was an accidental blowout at the Chhatak gas field at Tengratial, just a few days after Niko Resources started drilling there.
- 11 January – Bangladesh register their first Test match victory against Zimbabwe.
- 25 January – 3 cadres of Jagrata Muslim Janata Bangladesh were killed in Rajshahi.
- 27 January – Veteran politician and former Finance Minister Shah A M S Kibria is assassinated along with two of his aides in a grenade attack at Habiganj.
- 25 February – Bangladeshi U.N. peacekeepers were ambushed and at least nine were killed in the Democratic Republic of the Congo.
- 11 April – A nine-story commercial building collapsed due to a structural failure leading to 73 deaths in the Savar Upazila of Dhaka.
- 23 April – Protests erupt in the city of Bogra against the Ahmadiya community.
- 18 June – Bangladesh pull off one of the biggest shocks in cricket history by beating world champions Australia.
- 24 June - While Niko was drilling a relief well to contain the fire from the first blowout at the Chhatak gas field at Tengratial, another blowout occurred at the same field.
- 17 August – a series of bomb blasts are detonated simultaneously across 63 of 64 districts in Bangladesh.
- 1 October – Infamous Islamist militant Mufti Hannan was arrested by Rapid Action Battalion.
- 3 October – A series of synchronized bombings targeted courts in Chandpur, Chittagong, and Lakshmipur and resulted in 2 deaths and 34 injuries. It was carried out by Jamaat-ul-Mujahideen Bangladesh, an Islamist terrorist organisation, that opposed secular judiciary and legal system in Bangladesh.
- 14 November – Two senior assistant judges are killed in the bombing of a car transporting Judges to the District Court of Jhalakathi. Jama'atul Mujahideen Bangladesh (JMB) claimed responsibility for the bombings. The group, led by Shaykh Abdur Rahman and Siddiqur Rahman (also known as Bangla Bhai).
- 29 November – Another series of simultaneous suicide bombing of courts in Chittagong and Gazipur is carried out by Jamaat-ul-Mujahideen Bangladesh, killed 8 people and injured over 100.
- 8 December – A suicide bombing in Netrokona results in the deaths of eight people.

=== Awards and recognitions ===
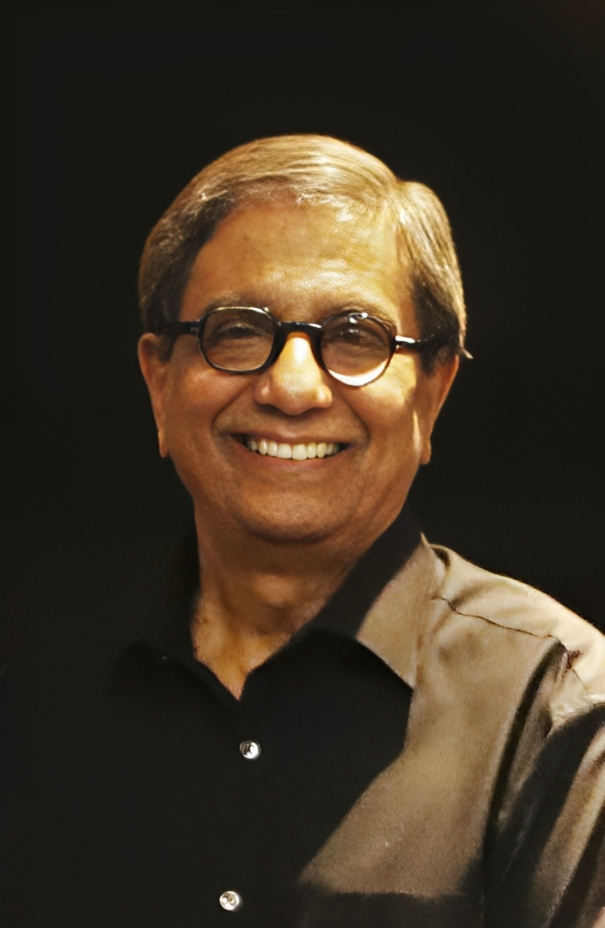
Matiur Rahman

==== International Recognition ====
- Matiur Rahman, the Editor of Daily Prothom Alo, was awarded Ramon Magsaysay Award.

==== Independence Day Award ====
Recipients	Area	Note
Mujibul Huq		
International Centre for Diarrhoeal Disease Research, Bangladesh		institution

==== Ekushey Padak ====
1. Saifur Rahman (language movement)
2. Khandaker Delwar Hossain (language movement)
3. Syed Mujtaba Ali (literature)
4. Abdullah Abu Sayeed (education)
5. Iqbal Mahmud (education)
6. Zubaida Gulshan Ara (literature)
7. Mohammad Abdul Gafur (language movement)
8. Abu Saleh (literature)
9. Ashab Uddin Ahmed (literature)
10. Chittaranjan Saha (education)
11. Srimat Bishuddh-ananda Mahathero (social service)
12. Bashir Ahmed (music)
13. Apel Mahmood (music)
14. Md Mashir Hossain (journalism)

=== Sports ===
- International football:
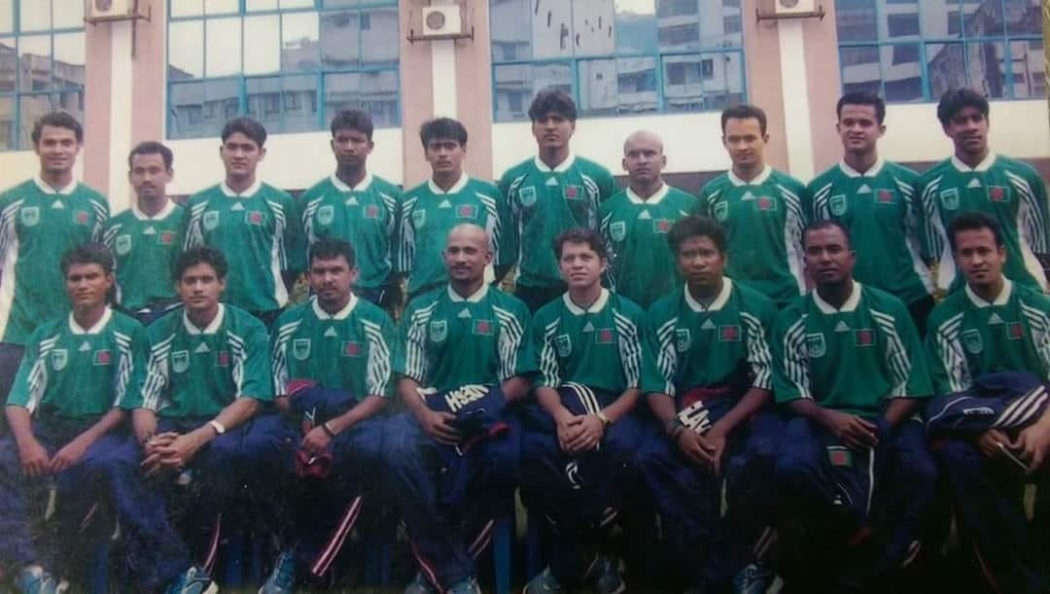
  - Bangladesh national football team group photo in 2005
    Defending champions Bangladesh lost to India in the final of the 2005 South Asian Football Federation Gold Cup to become runner up in the 8-nation tournament held in Pakistan.
  - Bangladesh national football B team became runner-up in Myanmar Grand Royal Challenge Cup held in Myanmar.
- Domestic football:
  - Brothers Union won the 2005 Dhaka Premier Division League while Dhaka Mohammedan became runner-up.
  - Dhaka Mohammedan won National Football League while Abahani Limited Dhaka became runner-up.
- Continental football:
  - Brothers Union represented Bangladesh in the 2005 AFC Cup.
- Cricket:
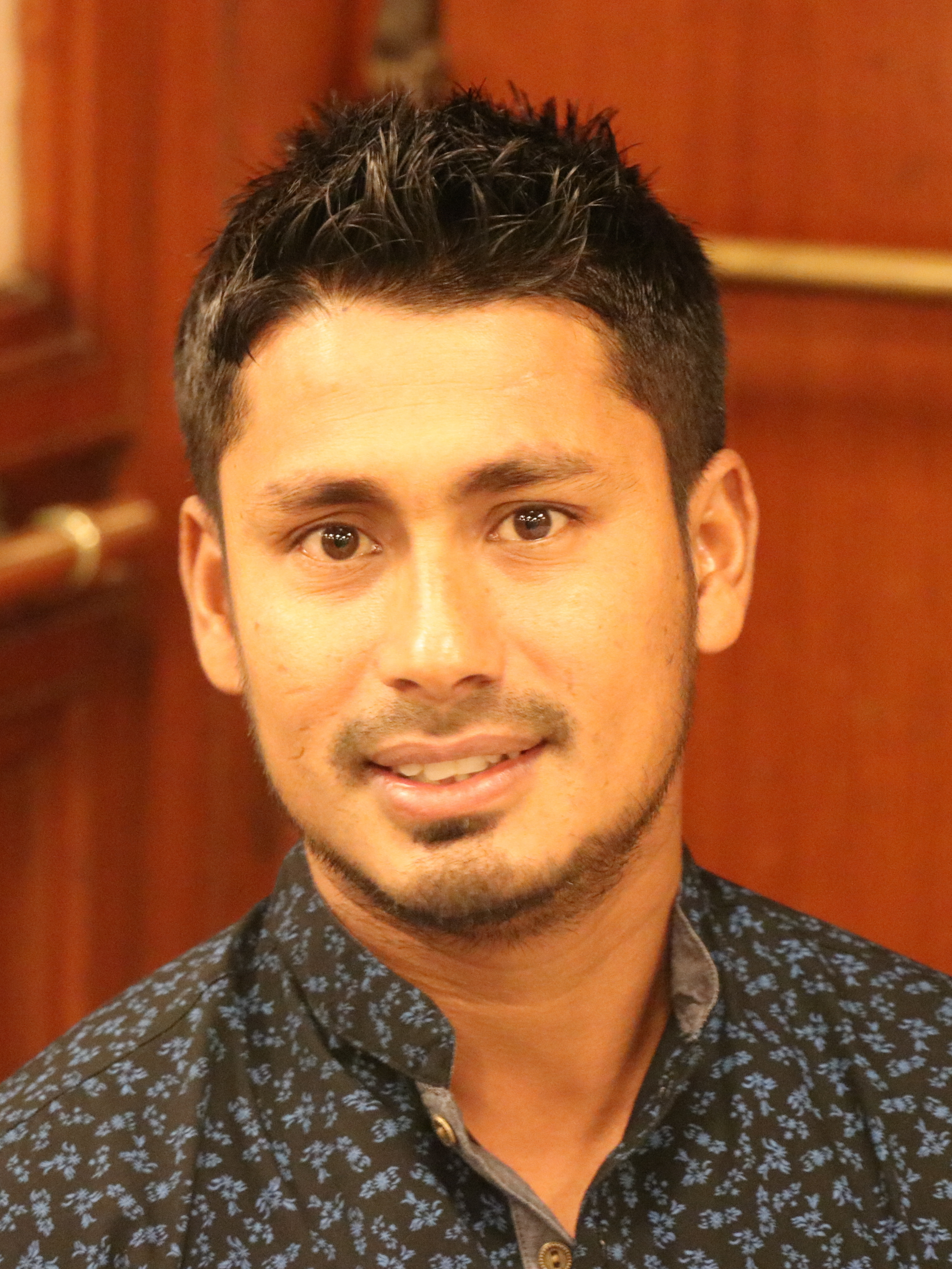
  - Mohammad Ashraful
    The Zimbabwe cricket team toured Bangladesh in January 2005 to play two Test matches and five One Day International matches. Bangladesh won the test series 1–0 with one match drawn. This was the first time Bangladesh had won both a Test match and a Test series. They also won the ODI series by 3–2 margin.
  - The Bangladesh national cricket team toured England for the first time in 2005. Bangladesh played two Test matches against England, which the hosts won comfortably. Later Bangladesh took on England and Australia in the tri-nations NatWest Series, where they pulled off a stunning 5-wicket upset victory over Australia, the world champions. In 18 June match, Australia scored 249 in 50 overs and then Bangladesh won with 4 balls to spare, after a century by Mohammad Ashraful. Bangladesh were knocked out of the tournament after three subsequent losses.
  - Later, the Bangladeshi cricket team toured Sri Lanka for three One Day International cricket matches and two Test cricket matches in August and September. They lost all these matches against the host.

== Deaths ==
- 27 January – Shah A M S Kibria, economist, diplomat and politician (b. 1931)
- 12 February – Monem Munna, footballer (b. 1966)
- 4 March – Serajul Huq, academic (b. 1905)
- 29 March – Khalid Hassan Milu, singer (b. 1960)
- 27 April – Abdus Samad Azad, politician (b. 1922)
- 8 May – Rafiqul Bari Chowdhury, cinematographer (b. 1940)
- 18 July – Abdur Rahman, actor (b. 1937)
- 17 November – Gautam Das, journalist and bureau chief for Dainik Samakal in Faridpur (born c.1978; murdered)

== See also ==
- 2000s in Bangladesh
- List of Bangladeshi films of 2005
- Timeline of Bangladeshi history
