= 2000s in Bangladesh =

The 2000s was a decade of the Gregorian calendar that began on 1 January 2000, and ended on 31 December 2009. For Bangladesh this decade was characterized by strife among the political parties over the caretaker government system for managing the national elections. Continued rapid urbanisation and globalization influenced the socio-economic and cultural activities of the country in this decade.

== Politics and national life ==
=== Political transition ===
In July 2001, the incumbent Bangladesh Awami League government stepped down to allow a caretaker government to preside over parliamentary elections. Political violence that had increased during the Bangladesh Awami League government's tenure continued to increase through the summer in the run up to the election. In August, The leader of the opposition, Khaleda Zia and Prime Minister Sheikh Hasina agreed during a visit of former President Jimmy Carter to respect the results of the election, join Parliament win or lose, forswear the use of hartals (violently enforced strikes) as political tools, and if successful in forming a government allow for a more meaningful role for the opposition in Parliament. The caretaker government was successful in containing the violence, which allowed a parliamentary general election to be successfully held on 1 October 2001.

=== Second Khaleda administration, 2001–2006 ===
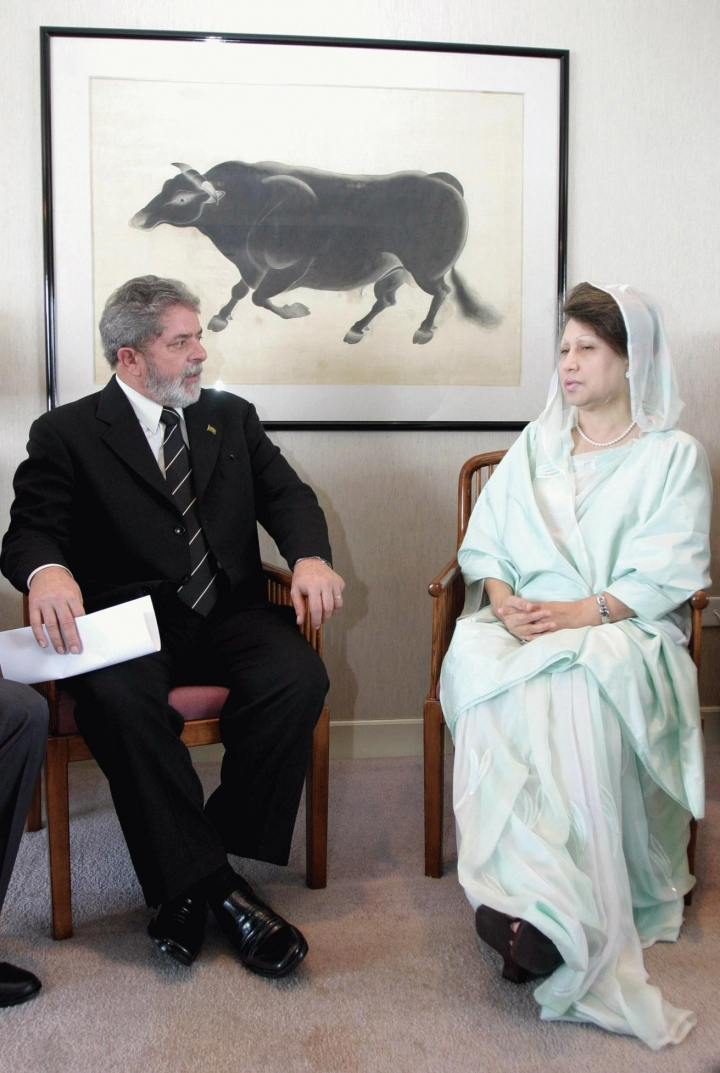
Zia with the President of Brazil Lula da Silva (2004)

The Four Party Alliance led by the Bangladesh Nationalist Party won over a two-thirds majority in Parliament. Begum Khaleda Zia was sworn in on 10 October 2001, as prime minister for the third time (first in 1991, second after the 15 February 1996 elections).

Despite her August 2001 pledge and all election monitoring groups declaring the election free and fair, Sheikh Hasina condemned the election, rejected the results, and boycotted Parliament. In 2002, however, she led her party legislators back to Parliament, but the Bangladesh Awami League again walked out in June 2003 to protest derogatory remarks about Hasina by a State Minister and the allegedly partisan role of the Parliamentary Speaker. In June 2004, the AL returned to Parliament without having any of their demands met. They then attended Parliament irregularly before announcing a boycott of the entire June 2005 budget session.

On 17 August 2005, near-synchronized blasts of improvised explosive devices in 63 out of 64 administrative districts targeted mainly government buildings and killed two persons. An extremist Islamist group named Jamaat-ul-Mujahideen Bangladesh (JMB) claimed responsibility for the blasts, which aimed to press home JMB's demand for a replacement of the secular legal system with Islamic sharia courts. Subsequent attacks on the courts in several districts killed 28 people, including judges, lawyers, and police personnel guarding the courts. A government campaign against the Islamic extremists led to the arrest of hundreds of senior and mid-level JMB leaders. Six top JMB leaders were tried and sentenced to death for their role in the murder of two judges; another leader was tried and sentenced to death in absentia in the same case.

In February 2006, the AL returned to Parliament, demanded early elections and requested significant changes in the electoral and caretaker government systems to stop alleged moves by the ruling coalition to rig the next election. The AL blamed the BNP for several high-profile attacks on opposition leaders and asserted the BNP was bent on eliminating Sheikh Hasina and the Awami League as a viable force. The BNP and its allies accused the AL of maligning Bangladesh at home and abroad out of jealousy over the government's performance on development and economic issues. Dialogue between the Secretaries General of the main ruling and opposition parties failed to sort out the electoral reform issues.

=== Political crisis and Caretaker government, 2006–2008 ===
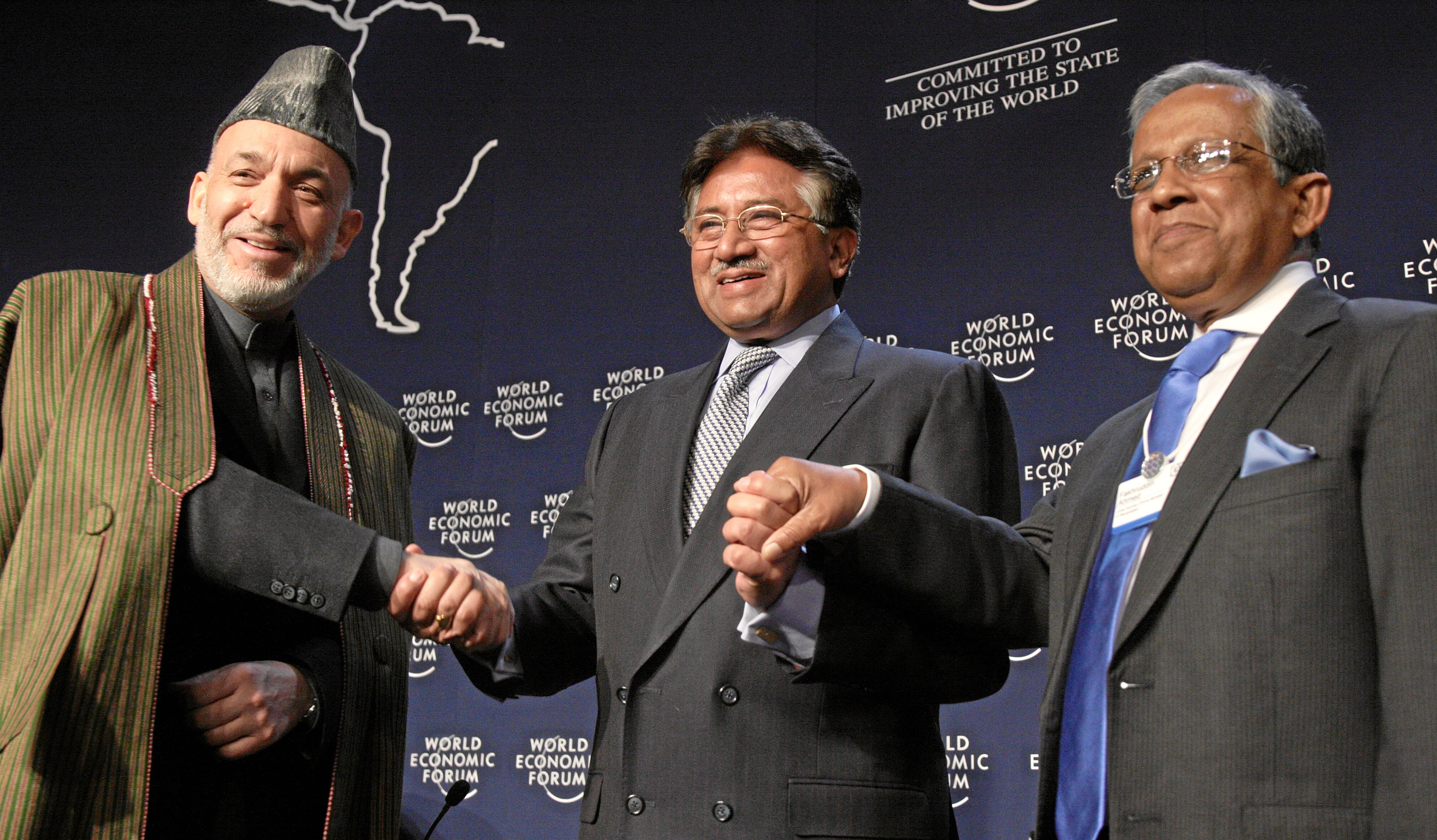
Hamid Karzai, Pervez Musharraf, and Fakhruddin Ahmed at the Annual Meeting 2008 of the World Economic Forum in Davos, Switzerland

The months preceding the planned 22 January 2007 elections were filled with political unrest and controversy. Following the end of Khaleda Zia's government in late October 2006, there were protests and strikes, during which 40 people were killed in the following month, over uncertainty about who would head the caretaker government. The caretaker government had difficulty bringing the all parties to the table. Awami League and its allies protested and alleged that the caretaker government favoured the BNP.

The interim period was marked by violence and strikes. The Election Commission disqualified Hussain Muhammad Ershad as a candidate. On 3 January, the Grand Alliance responded by withdrawing its candidates en masse. They demanded to have voters' lists published.

Later in the month, the president Iajuddin Ahmed imposed a state of emergency. Iajuddin Ahmed resigned from the post of chief adviser, under the pressure of Bangladesh Army, and appointed Fakhruddin Ahmed, the new chief adviser. Political activity was prohibited. The military-backed government worked to develop graft and corruption cases against leaders and members of both major parties. In March 2007, Khaleda Zia's two sons, who both had positions in Bangladesh Nationalist Party, were charged with corruption. Hasina was charged with graft and extortion in April 2007, and a day later, Khaleda Zia was charged with graft as well. There was attempt by Bangladesh Army chief Moeen U Ahmed, the head of Anti-Terrorism division of the Directorate General of Forces Intelligence Brigadier General ATM Amin, and Director of Directorate General of Forces Intelligence Brigadier General Chowdhury Fazlul Bari to remove Sheikh Hasina and Khaleda Zia from politics. Former Army Chief, General Hasan Mashhud Chowdhury, was made the head of Bangladesh Anti Corruption Commission. The Anti Corruption Commission and the Bangladesh Election Commission were strengthened by the caretaker government. On 27 August 2007 violence broke out in the University of Dhaka campus between students and soldiers of Bangladesh Army. Students called strikes and burned effigies of the army chief. Police attacked the students and physically assaulted Acting Vice-chancellor Prof AFM Yusuf Haider and other faculty members of the University of Dhaka. Students were joined in demonstration by street vendors and slum residents who were evicted by the government. Bangladesh Army agreed to the demands of the protesters and removed the Army camp from the University of Dhaka campus. Students and teachers expressed dissatisfaction over the continued state of emergency in Bangladesh.

=== Second Hasina administration ===
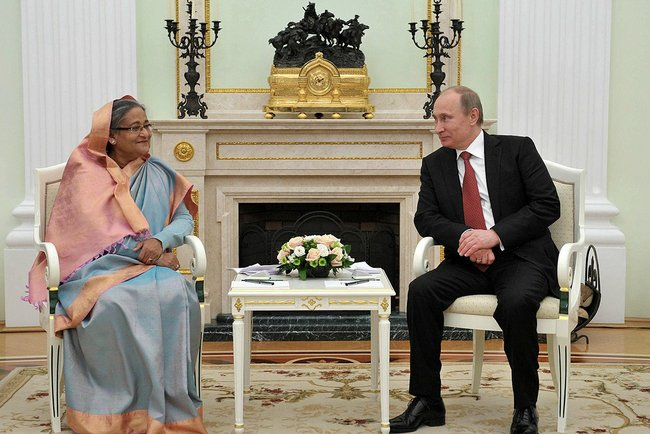
Sheikh Hasina with Vladimir Putin in Moscow

The Awami league won national election on 29 December 2008 as part of a larger electoral alliance that also included the Jatiya Party led by former military ruler General Hussain Muhammad Ershad as well as some leftist parties. According to the Official Results, Bangladesh Awami League won 230 out of 299 constituencies, and together with its allies, had a total of 262 parliamentary seats. The Awami League and its allies received 57% of the total votes cast. The AL alone got 48%, compared to 36% of the other major alliance led by the BNP which by itself got 33% of the votes. Sheikh Hasina, as party head, is the new Prime Minister. Her term of office began on 7 January 2009 after Fakhruddin Ahmed. The new cabinet had several new faces, including three women in prominent positions: Dr Dipu Moni (Foreign Minister), Matia Chowdhury (Agriculture Minister) and Sahara Khatun (Home Minister). Younger MPs with a link to assassinated members of the 1972–1975 AL government are Syed Ashraful Islam, son of Syed Nazrul Islam, Sheikh Fazle Noor Taposh, son of Sheikh Fazlul Huq Moni, and Tanjim Ahmad Sohel Taj, son of Tajuddin Ahmad.

Since 2009, the Awami League government faced several major political challenges, including BDR (border security force) mutiny, power crisis, unrest in garments industry and stock market fluctuations. Judicial achievements for the party included restoring 1972 constitution (set by the first Awami League government), beginning of war crimes trials, and guilty verdict in 1975 assassination trial. According to the Nielsen 2-year survey, 50% felt the country was moving in the right direction, and 36% gave the government a favourable rating.

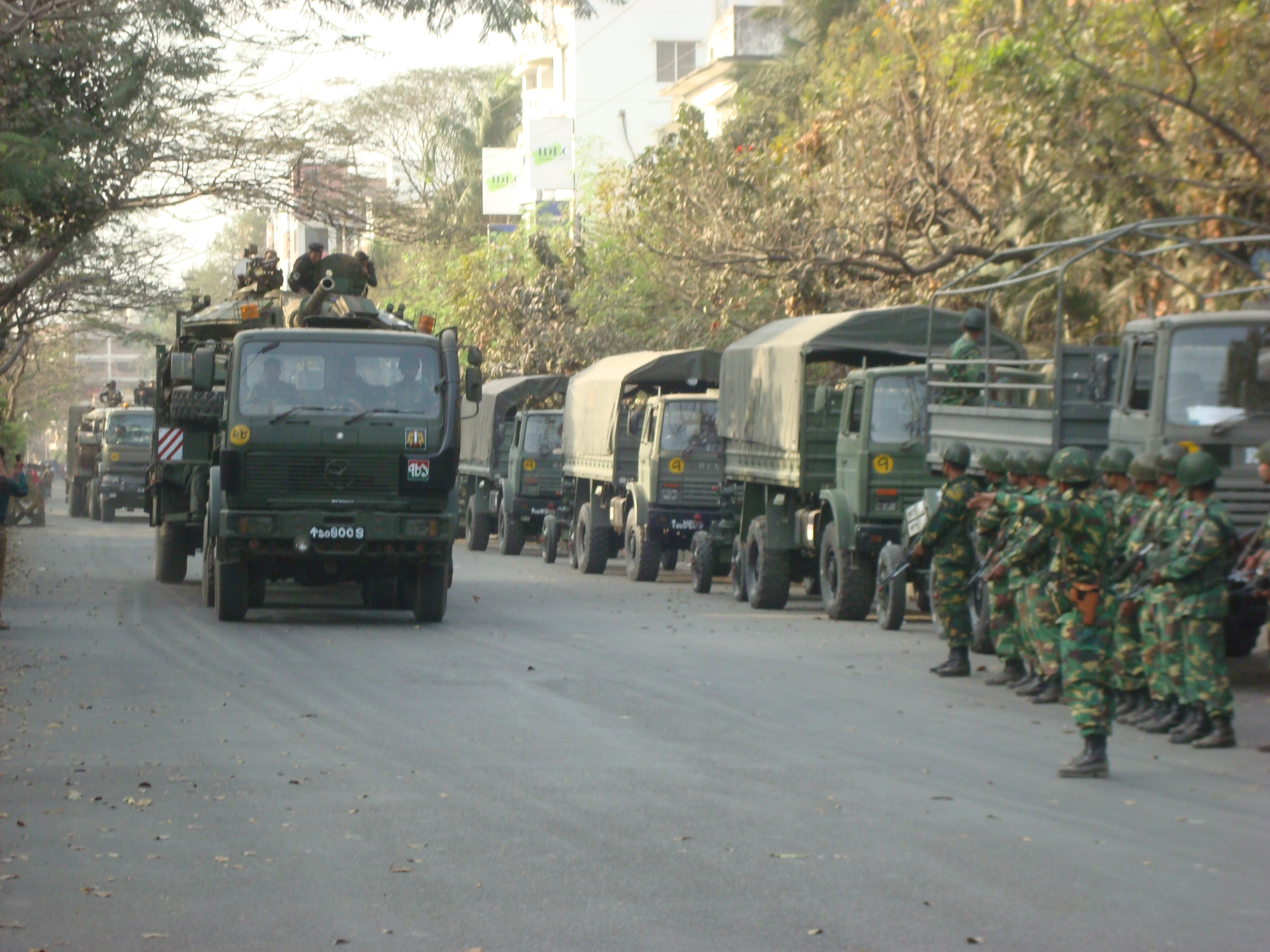
Army convoy gathering behind the tanks near Abahani ground on 26 February 2009

==== Bangladesh Rifles revolt ====
On 25 and 26 February 2009, section of the Bangladesh Rifles (BDR), a paramilitary force mainly tasked with guarding the country's borders, staged a mutiny that brought the national life to a standstill. The rebelling BDR soldiers took over the BDR headquarters in Pilkhana, killing the BDR Director-General and some army officers. They also fired on civilians, held many of their officers hostage, vandalised property and looted valuables. By the second day, unrest had spread to 12 other towns and cities.

Eventually, a total of seventy-four people were killed. Among them were 57 army officers seconded to the BDR. The Chief of the BDR, the Deputy Chief and all 16 Sector Commanders died during the revolt. The mutiny ended as the mutineers surrendered their arms and released the hostages after a series of discussions and negotiations with the government.

== Administrative divisions ==
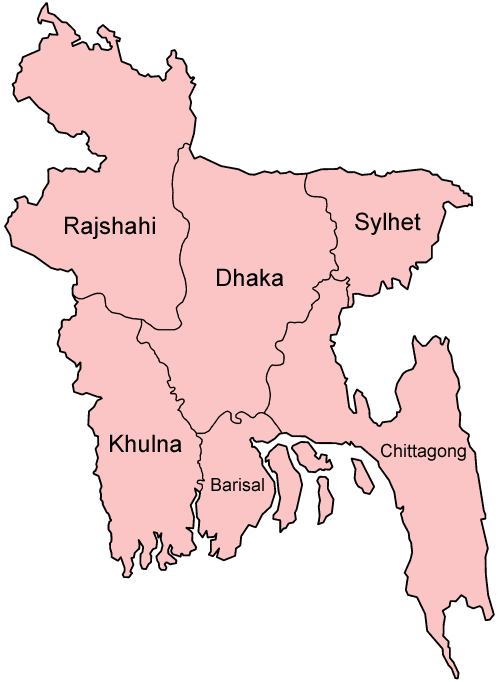
Divisions of Bangladesh in 2000s decade

Throughout the decade Bangladesh was administratively divided into 6 divisions, namely Dhaka, Chittagong, Khulna, Rajshahi, Barisal and Sylhet which were further subdivided into a total of 64 districts (See List of districts of Bangladesh).

== Demographics ==
Based on World Development Indicators published by the World Bank the population of Bangladesh grew from 129 million at the beginning of the decade to 150 million by the end. This signifies an annual population growth rate of 1.5%. Population density increased from 991 to 1156 per km^{2}. The urban population was 23.6% of the total at the beginning, which ended up at 29.7%. Dhaka, the largest city, with a population of 10.3 million, accounted for 33.1% of the total urban population by 2009. United Nations World Population Prospects show that the population growth rate was in decreasing trend (from 2.0% per annum to 1.1%), primarily due to reduction in fertility rate (births per woman) from 3.2 to 2.4. Life expectancy at birth increased from 65.3 years to 69.8 years with Child (0–5) mortality reducing from 87 per 1,000 births to 53. Age dependency ratio (% of working-age population) changed from 69.2% to 59.3% by the end of the decade.

== Climate ==
=== Temperature and precipitation ===
Climate data for Bangladesh in 2000s
Month	Jan	Feb	Mar	Apr	May	Jun	Jul	Aug	Sep	Oct	Nov	Dec	Year
Daily mean °C (°F)	18.7 (65.7)	21.4 (70.5)	25.4 (77.7)	27.9 (82.2)	28.3 (82.9)	28.4 (83.1)	28.2 (82.8)	28.4 (83.1)	28.4 (83.1)	27.1 (80.8)	23.8 (74.8)	20.1 (68.2)	25.5 (77.9)
Average precipitation mm (inches)	8.2 (0.32)	13.8 (0.54)	33.7 (1.33)	188.0 (7.40)	225.4 (8.87)	384.1 (15.12)	449.5 (17.70)	347.9 (13.70)	248.5 (9.78)	179.5 (7.07)	29.4 (1.16)	3.7 (0.15)	2,111.7 (83.14)
Source: Climatic Research Unit (CRU) of University of East Anglia (UEA)

Compared to prior decade the average winter temperature from December to February increased by about 0.6 degree Celsius leading to overall average annual temperature increase by about 0.3 degree Celsius. Average rainfall decreased for July-Sep resulting in overall average annual rainfall decrease by about 31 cm.

=== Natural disasters ===
Cyclone Sidr making landfall in Bangladesh.

The extremely severe tropical cyclone, named Cyclone Sidr, was the major natural disaster in this decade. Sidr formed in the central Bay of Bengal, and quickly turned into a Category-5 equivalent tropical cyclone on the Saffir-Simpson Scale. The storm eventually made landfall in Bangladesh on 15 November 2007, causing large-scale evacuations. At least 3,447 deaths have been blamed on the storm. Save the Children estimated the number of deaths associated with the cyclone to be between 3,100 and 10,000, while the Red Crescent Society reported on 18 November that the number of deaths could be up to 15,000. International groups pledged United States Dollars95 million to repair the damage, which was estimated at $1.7 billion (2007 USD).

Besides there have been multiple flood events throughout the decade. In late summer 2002, heavy monsoon rains led to massive flooding in eastern India, Nepal, and Bangladesh, killing over 500 people and leaving millions homeless. There were estimated 3.5 million victims of flooding in 30 out of 64 districts. In 2004, monsoon flood intensified from April to July leading to the destruction of the rice crop in the northern region just before it was harvested. Water persisted in these regions for 3 to 4 weeks whilst gradually draining southwards, severely flooding most of Central Bangladesh. The high water level and widest extent of the flood was reached on 24 July affecting 39 out of 64 districts and 36 million people. In 2007 a series of floods impacted South Asia including Bangladesh. During this flood an estimated 7.5 million people had fled their homes, more than 50,000 people had diarrhoea or other waterborne diseases and more than 400,000 people took temporary shelters.

== Economy ==
=== National income and balance of payments ===
Bangladesh GDP was US$67.0 billion in 2000, which grew to US$109.2 billion in 2009 (in 2010 constant dollar) signifying a 5.0% annual growth. Agricultural Sector contributed to 23.8% of GDP in the beginning of the decade, which decreased to 17.9% by the end. During the same period contribution from the industrial sector increased from 23.3% to 26.4% and that of the service sector increased from 52.9% to 55.7%. Per capita GDP increased from US$509 to US$726 (in 2010 constant dollar).

According to World Development Indicators published by the World Bank, on 2010 constant dollar basis, Bangladesh used to export US$4.0 billion (12.3% of GDP) worth of goods and services as of 2000, which grew at annual average rate of 16.3% to US$18.3 billion (16.9% of GDP) in 2009. The increase can be attributed to rapid growth in export oriented ready-made garments sector. During the same time import of goods and services grew from US$6.4 billion (17.0% of GDP) to US$24.9 billion (23.2% of GDP) - also driven by raw material import for ready-made garments industry. Over the decade, Foreign Direct Investment and Personal Remittances Receipt averaged 0.68% and 6.61% of GDP; while, total Reserve averaged at 21.6% of external debt and 2.9 month's coverage of import.

Gross National Income (at 2010 constant dollar) grew from US$69.3 billion to US$117.8 billion over the decade. At the beginning of this period External Debt stock (of which concessional debt was 94.8%) was 28.3% of gross national income (GNI) and External Debt Service burden was 1.4% of GNI. By the end of the decade, External Debt stock (of which concessional debt now was 78.8%) stood at 23.0% of GNI and External Debt Service burden was 0.9% of the same. During the same period Military expenditure decreased from 1.4% to 1.2% of GNI.

=== Agriculture ===
Aggregate value addition from agricultural sector was US$13.0 billion in 2000 (in 2010 constant USD), which grew at average annual rate of 3.6% to US$18.5 billion by 2009 (in the same constant USD). During this decade, crop production grew at an annual average rate of 3.1% driven by cereal production increase from 39.5 million metric tons to 49.7 million (implying annual growth of 2.3%) - enabled by improvement in cereal yield from 3384.4 kg per hectare to 4176 kg. At the same time livestock production grew at 3.2% per annum and fisheries production increased at annual rate of 5.7%. Altogether these contributed to overall food production increase by annualized rate of 3.1%.

=== Industrial and service sectors ===
Net value addition from industrial sector, which stood at US$14.0 billion in 2000 (in 2010 constant USD), grew at average annual rate of 6.7% to US$26.9 billion by 2009 (in the same constant USD basis). Manufacturing sector contributed 64.3% of industrial value added in the beginning of this period and it gradually changed to 64.8% by the end. There were 8,293 recorded industrial design applications by Bangladeshi residents in this decade, more than double of that from earlier decade. As of 2005-06 there were 34,701 industrial establishments in the country generating employment for 3.34 million.

On the other hand, net value addition from the service sector amounting US$35.8 billion in 2000, also grew at average annual rate of 5.0% and stood at US$58.4 billion by 2009 (in 2010 constant USD). Major business enterprises that started journey in Bangladesh in this decade include Western Marine Shipyard in 2000, RanksTel and TeleTalk in 2004, United Airways in 2005, Best Air, NovoAir and Regent Power in 2007 and Walton in 2008.

== Infrastructure ==
=== Transportation ===
The construction of new roads somewhat slowed down in 2000s compared to earlier decade, but several major bridges were constructed. The arterial road network under the jurisdiction of Roads and Highways department (R&HD) in 2001 was about 20,854 km including 3,144 km of national highways, 1,746 km of regional roads and 15,964 km of Type A feeder roads. By 2011, there were about 21,000 km of highways (including over 3,478 km of national highways and 4,221 km of regional highways) as well as 18,258 bridges to connect the roads. In December 2000, over 406,000 different types of motorised vehicles were plying on the roads of Bangladesh, and the number rose to 852,416 by 2005. Major bridges constructed in the 2000s include Syed Nazrul Islam Bridge over Meghna River in 2002, Lalon Shah Bridge over Padma River in 2004, Khan Jahan Ali Bridge over Rupsha River in 2005 and Mukterpur Bridge over Dhaleshwari River in 2008 (see List of bridges in Bangladesh).

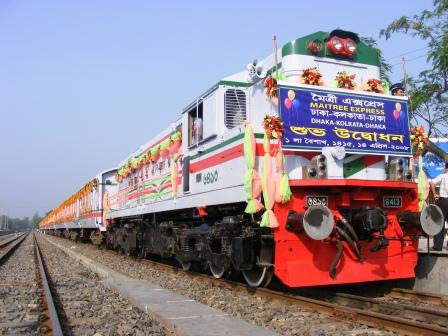
Inaugural of Maitree Express train of the Bangladesh Railway on 14 April 2008, at Dhaka Cantonment

The opening of Bangabandhu Jamuna Bridge in 1998 opened up the scope for expanding the railways, especially for connecting the Bhuapur end of the bridge with Dhaka via tangail. This required a connectivity between Broad-gauge (BG) lines in the west of Jamuna to the Metre-gauge (MG) line in the east. Most part of the construction works of this km long section was completed by 2001. On 14 August 2003, direct BB train communication between East zone (Joydevpur) and West Zone (Rajshahi) was started. In 2008, direct passenger train "Maitree Express" between Dhaka and Kolkata was established. From 14 April 2009, BG Trains started coming to Dhaka directly after Dhaka-Joydevpur section was converted into dual gauge.

With 3,800 kilometers of navigable rivers during the dry season and 6,000 kilometers during the monsoon season, the waterway network in Bangladesh remained an important part of the transport network. As of 2005, inland water transport was accounting for 8% of the passenger transport and 16% of the freight transport across all forms of ground transport in Bangladesh.

With multiple private sector carriers in operation along with the national carrier Biman, air transport sector finally started to take off in this decade. As of 1999, there were 5,900 registered carrier departures worldwide which increased to 16,399 by 2009. During the same period number of passenger carried increased from 1.22 million to about 1.41 million per annum.

=== Telecommunication ===
In 2000 BTTB went into Global Telecom Service (GTS) Telex Exchange venture with British Teleco. The next year Telecommunication Act was enacted, to establish Bangladesh Telecommunication Regulatory Commission (BTRC). In 2002 the Government issued ICT Policy. From earlier decade 3 mobile operators, namely Citycell, GrameenPhone and Aktel were in operation in Bangladesh. in 2004, BTTB owned Teletalk cellular mobile launched. Next year, Egypt-based Orascom acquired Sheba Telecom and launched Banglalink.

In the beginning of the decade there were 491,303 fixed telephone line subscription in the country - which increased to 1,234,895 by the end signifying 0.82 lines per 100 people. However, there was rapid growth in mobile cellular subscriptions in this decade. By 2009 there were 51,359,315 mobile subscriptions signifying 34.14 lines per 100 people.

=== Energy ===
In 2000 per capital electric power consumption was 101.5 kWh, which increased to 219.2 kWh by 2009. During the same period per capita energy usage increased from 138.8 kg of oil equivalent to 187.3 kg and fossil fuel energy consumption increased from 57.9% to 69.0% of total.

In the year 2000, the electricity produced in the country was coming from: hydroelectric sources: 4.7%, natural gas sources: 88.8%, oil sources: 6.5% and coal sources: 0.0%. By 2009 the distribution changed to hydroelectric sources: 1.1%, natural gas sources: 91.6%, oil sources: 4.3% and coal sources: 2.9%.

On 7 January 2005, there was an accidental blowout at the Chhatak gas field at Tengratial - just a few days after Niko Resources started drilling in that location. Another blowout occurred at the same field on 24 June, while Niko was trying to contain the fire from the first blowout. The gas field was ablaze for years, causing significant loss of resources for Bangladesh and damaging the environment of surrounding areas. The Government went into a lengthy legal battle with Niko for adequate compensation.

=== Financial services ===
As of 2008, in addition to the money and capital markets, the financial sector of Bangladesh included a number of insurance, pensions, and microfinance institutions. However, the sector was dominated by the banking industry, which consisted of 4 state-owned commercial banks (SCBs), 5 state-owned specialized banks, 30 domestic private commercial banks (PCBs), 9 foreign commercial banks, and 29 non-bank financial institutions (NBFIs) under the supervision of Bangladesh Bank, the central bank of the country. In the insurance sub-sector, 21 companies provided general insurance while 6 other provided life insurance; but most of the assets in the sector was commanded by the two large, state-owned companies— the Sadharan Bima Corporation for general insurance and the Jiban Bima Corporation for life insurance.

In order to reinforce the Government's ongoing financial sector reform programs from earlier decade (see here), Bangladesh bank administered the World Bank's Financial Institutions Development Project from 2000 to 2006, which, according to Asian Development Bank, enabled "substantial progress towards sustainable financing of private sector initiatives to accelerate industrial growth in the country".

There were developments in the Capital Market as well. In the beginning of the decade, shares and debentures of 442 companies were traded in the equity market (258 in Dhaka Stock Exchange and 184 in Chittagong Stock Exchange). The listing and trading of debt securities were minimum. The market capitalisation on 30 June 2000 in the two stock exchanges was Tk 80.86 billion and Tk 53.12 billion, equivalent to about $1.62 billion and $1.06 billion respectively. The establishment and incorporation of the Central Depository Bangladesh Ltd (CDBL) as a public limited company in August 2000 and the incorporation of the Central Depository System (CDS) as an independent company in January 2004 helped increase operational efficiency of the stock markets. From 2007 onwards, in the aftermath of the largest IPO at the time, that of Grameenphone Ltd., the market began to appreciate culminating in a significant bubble in 2010. In 2010 alone, the DSE was the second-highest performing market globally, with the general index, DGEN, posting a 92 per cent year-on-year return. However the bubble was short-lived, as the market began to slow from 8 December 2010, beginning a protracted phase of contraction.

=== Education ===
In this decade, the focus of Bangladesh education policy at school level switched from "quantity" to "quality". Reforms were implemented in school managing committee (SMC), retirement and service benefit of non-government teachers, teacher training, information technology and computer education, secondary curriculum, school-based assessment system (SBA) and English language teaching. In different phases the amount of public sector contribution towards salary subvention to non- government educational institutions at secondary and higher secondary level was increased to 90% in 2001.

The coverage of primary education system significantly improved in this decade. As of 2006, number of primary-school-age children outside school came down to approximately 634 thousand. However, number of teachers per 1,000 primary student remained a dismal 2.4. Based on World Bank data, in 2000, there were 10.33 million secondary school students (including higher secondary) in the country, which grew to 10.91 million by the end of the decade. Secondary school enrollment rate ranged between 48.0% to 48.4% during the same period. Over these years ratio of female students in secondary education changed from 49.9% to 51.6%; while, number of teachers for these students grew from 269 to 387 thousand.

In this decade the secondary and higher secondary education administration for the country, used to be managed by 7 general education boards, namely Dhaka, Rajshahi, Comilla, Jessore, Chittagong, Barisal and Sylhet; a Technical Education Board and a Madrasah Education Board.

The tertiary education used to be managed under University Grants Commission, the apex body of all the affiliated public, private and international universities of Bangladesh, while the colleges providing tertiary education operated under the authority of National University. Number of general purpose public universities increased from six (DU, RU, CU, JU, IU and newly opened KU) in the beginning of the decade to eleven by the end with the addition of JnU, JKKNIU, CoU, BRU and BUP. BUET used to be the only university for Engineering education; but in 2003, four other institutes of technology were upgraded to universities. During the decade, number of agricultural universities in the public sector increased from two to five and one more science and technology university was added to existing three. BSMMU continued to serve as the university overseeing post graduate medical education in the country. Asian University for Women was established in Chittagong in 2008 as the second International University in the country after IUT. Number of private universities continued to grow rapidly throughout the decade. By the end of 2000s there were at least 55 registered private universities, but not all of them were recognized for their quality. However, some of the older private universities expanded and moved to larger campus in this decade.

=== Mass media ===
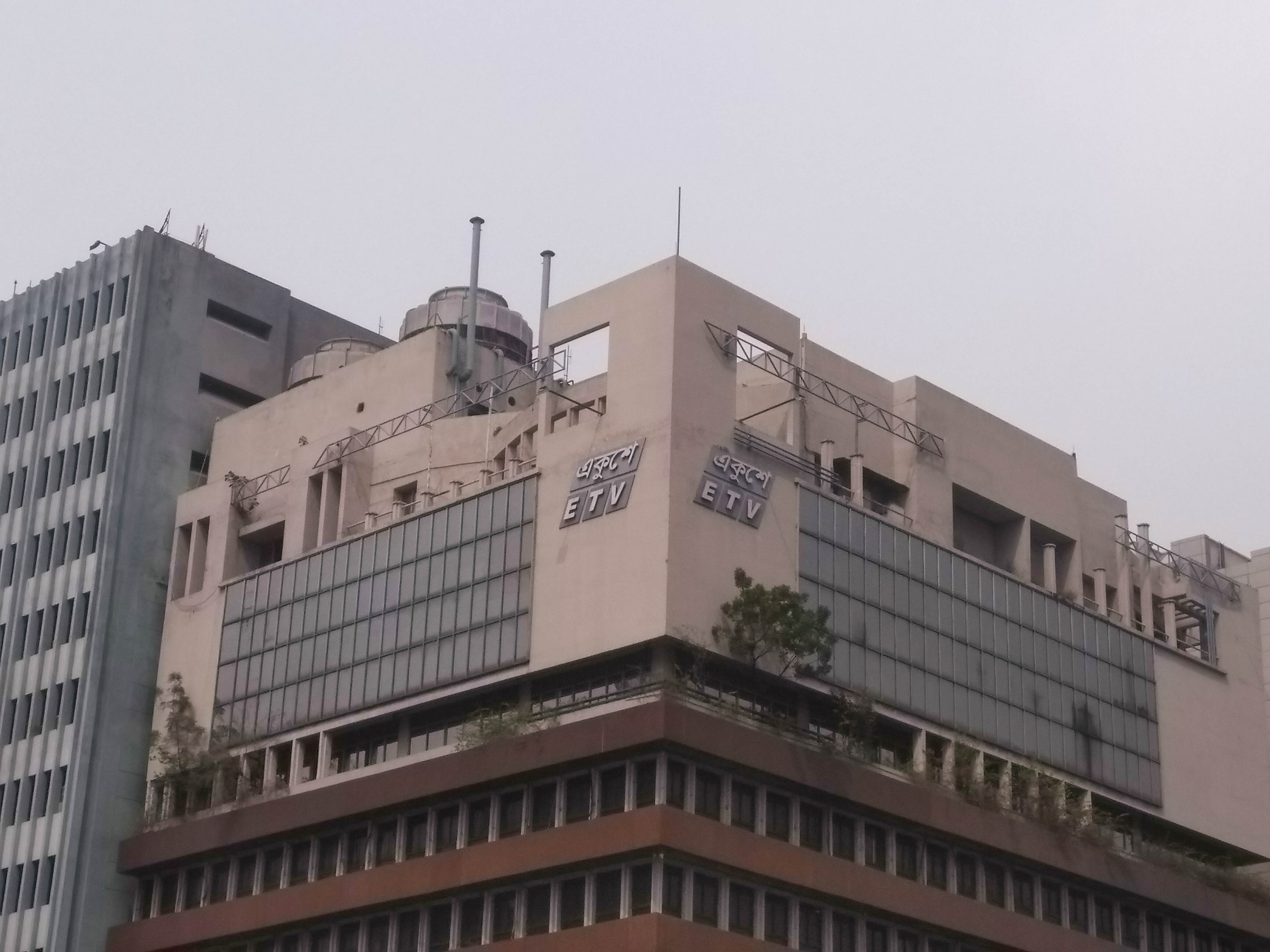
The headquarters of Ekushey Television, Kawran Bazar, Dhaka

In the 1990s the country saw explosive growth in the number of newspapers in publication. The trend continued in the following decade. Jugantor and Samakal were the two notable additions to the landscape of daily newspapers in the 2000s. Moreover, the country's first online news outlet, bdnews24.com, started operation in 2005 which was a transformative change for the print media of the country. Earlier online Bangladeshi newspapers were merely a static copy of the printed version, but bdnews24.com started giving realtime news updates on their site - which revolutionized dissemination of information in Bangladesh.

BTV launched BTV World in 2004, but it faced fierce competition from private TV channels. One notable development in 2000 was the launch of the country's first private terrestrial TV channel - Ekushey TV (ETV), which covered half the country's population and "turned out to be the most popular channel offering brisk, highly professional, and path-breaking programmes". In 2002, the BNP-led government shut down ETV, ostensibly for technical reasons, although the conventional wisdom was that the channel was being penalized for being too critical of the party. In the post ETV era, many new private TV channels mushroomed and competed with older channels to take a share of audiences. NTV, RTV, Banglavision, Boishakhi TV and Desh TV were among the new channels which started their journey in this period.

While television viewership persistently increased from 31% in 1995 to 42% in 1998 and 61% in 2002; the number of people with radio exposure decreased from 42% to 24.1% from 1998 to 2002. The rapid increase in availability of television from the late 1990s and the subsequent years was the major reason behind the fall of radio listenership. Although private TV channels were already available, the radio network was still controlled by state-owned Bangladesh Betar in this decade.

== Awards and recognitions ==
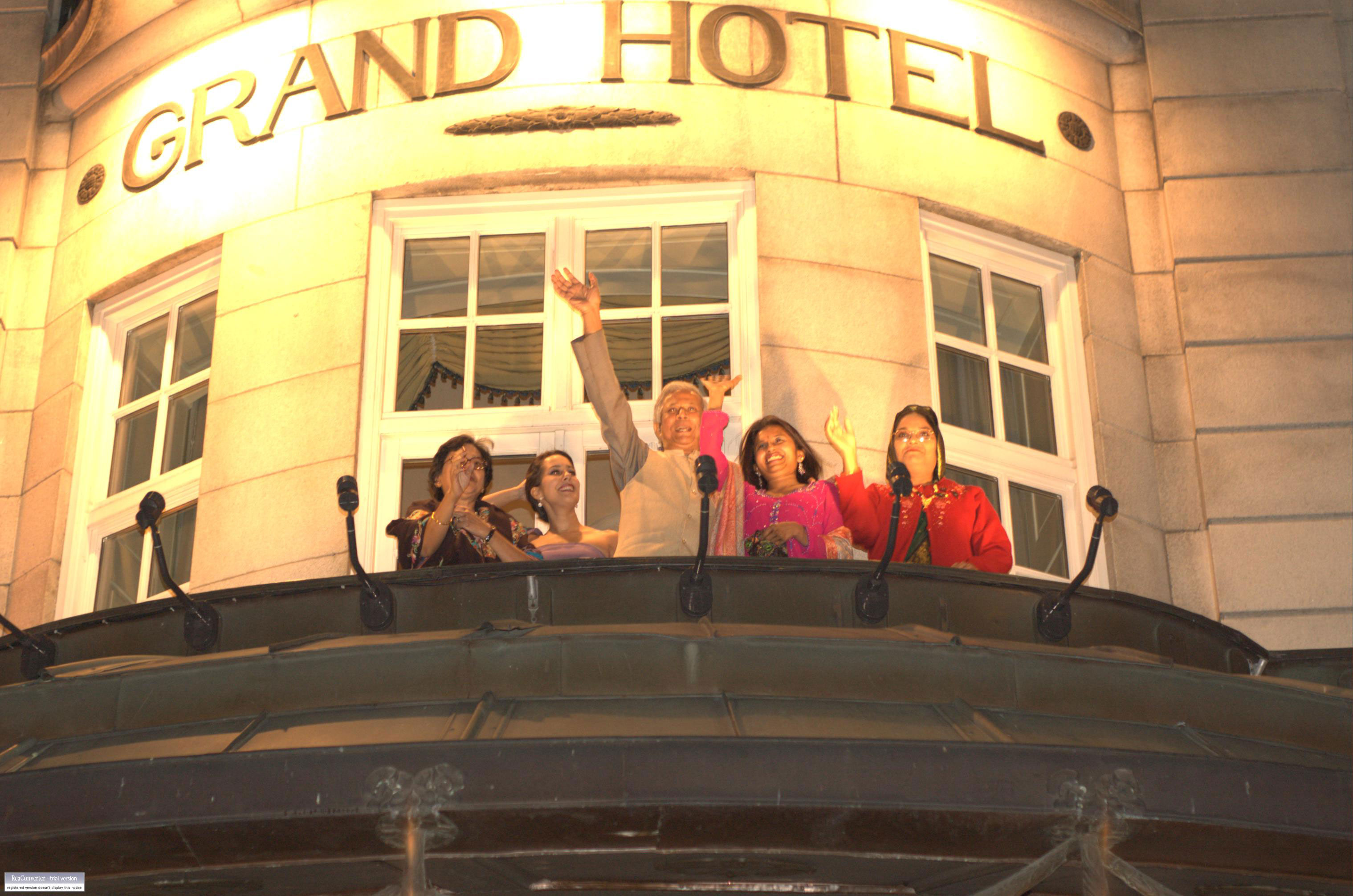
Yunus at the Grand Hotel in Oslo, Norway

- Abdullah Abu Sayeed, the Founder of Bishwo Shahitto Kendro, was awarded Ramon Magsaysay Award in 2004.
- ATN Bangla won the special International Children's Day of Broadcasting Award at the 32nd International Emmy Awards Gala in New York City in 2004.
- Matiur Rahman, the Editor of Daily Prothom Alo, was awarded Ramon Magsaysay Award in 2005.
- On 13 October 2006, Dr. Muhammad Yunus and Grameen Bank jointly won the Nobel Peace Prize "for their efforts to create economic and social development from below".

Yunus was the first Bangladeshi to ever get a Nobel Prize. After receiving the news of the important award, Yunus announced that he would use part of his share of the $1.4 million (equivalent to $2.24 million in 2025) award money to create a company to make low-cost, high-nutrition food for the poor; while the rest would go toward setting up an eye hospital for the poor in Bangladesh.

- Grameen Shakti was awarded the Right Livelihood Award in 2007.
- Bangladeshi software engineer Nafees Bin Zafar received Scientific and Technical Academy Award (OSCAR) in 2007 for his contribution to the development of the fluid simulation system for the movie: Pirates of the Caribbean: At World's End.
- Bangladeshi attorney and environmentalist Rizwana Hasan was awarded the Goldman Environmental Prize in 2009.
- Muhammad Yunus was awarded the Presidential Medal of Freedom by the US US President Barack Obama in 2009.

== Culture ==
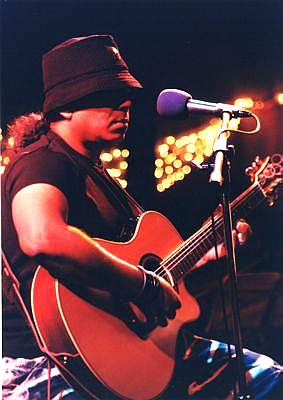
Bachchu performing in 2008

=== Literature ===
Throughout the 2000s the literary scene of the country remained vibrant. Humayun Ahmed continued his reign as the most popular author in the country as his books consistently remained the highest seller in Ekushey Book Fair. Notable literary works produced by the authors of Bangladesh in this decade include: Humayun Ahmed's Brishti Bilash, Jochona O Jononir Golpo; Haripada Datta's Jonmo-Jonmantor, Drabirgram; Anisul Hoque's Se, Maa, Dushwapner Jatri, Alo Andhokare Jai and Nandini; Shamsur Rahman's Hridopodmay Jotsna Dolay and Na Bastob Na Dushshopno; Abdullah Abu Sayeed's Bidaye, Obonti, Bohe Joloboti Dhara, Bhalobashar Shampan, Amar Uposthapok Jibon, Amar Ashabad and Bisostro Journal; Hasan Azizul Huq's Agunpakhi; Muntassir Mamoon's Lorai and Rajakar Shomogro; Salauddin Ahmed edited Ekatturer Chithi and Tahmima Anam's A Golden Age. The assassination attempt on writer Humayun Azad in 2004 and his subsequent mysterious death later in the year shocked the nation. In this decade the literature circle of the country also lost luminaries like: Ahmed Sofa (2001), Nilima Ibrahim and poet Syed Ali Ahsan (2002), master playwrights Selim Al Deen and Abdullah al Mamun (2008) and baul musician Shah Abdul Karim (2009).

=== Visual arts ===
Photographers like Anwar Hossain, Hasan Saifuddin Chandan and Shahidul Alam continued to dominate the photography field. Shahidul, who set up Pathshala South Asian Media Institute in Dhaka in 1998 and the Chobi Mela International Photography Festival in 1999 remained the director of that institute throughout the decade. He had been a judge of the World Press Photo competition on four occasions, and was the first Asian chair of its judging panel. He was awarded an Honorary Fellowship of the Royal Photographic Society in 2001. The paintings field was also quite vibrant. New contributors in painting and painting-related mixed techniques in this decade include Abdus Shakur Shah, Kanak Chanpa Chakma, Mahbubur Rahman, Tayeba Begum Lipi, Ashok Karmakar. Among the veterans artist Shahabuddin Ahmed and painter cartoonist Rafiqun Nabi continued to make active contributions. In this decade Bangladeshi artists focused on social justice, rampant industrialization, gentrification, and man's disconnect from nature. Prominent architects who made notable contribution in this decade include Jalal Ahmad, Salauddin Ahmed, Saif Ul Haque, Ehsan Khan, Mubasshar Hussein, Mustapha Khalid Palash, Enamul Karim Nirjhar, Rafiq Azam and Marina Tabassum.

=== Performing arts ===
In this decade music directors and composers like Shujeo Shyam, Alauddin Ali, Gazi Mazharul Anwar, Satya Saha, Ahmed Imtiaz Bulbul, S.I. Tutul, Emon Saha, Alam Khan, Kabir Bakul and Sheikh Sadi Khan and singers like Sabina Yasmin, Runa Laila, Subir Nandi, Andrew Kishore, Bashir Ahmad, Asif Akbar, Baby Naznin, Samina Chowdhury, Kumar Biswajit, Uma Khan, Kanak Chapa, Fahmida Nabi and Monir Khan led the music arena with modern Bengali music and playback music of films. Singers like Partha Barua, Tahsan, Bappa Mazumder, and Habib Wahid cemented their places as rising stars of modern Bengali songs. The established bands from 1980s and 90s, including LRB, Souls, Feedback, Nagar Baul, Miles and Warfaze continued to dominate the 2000s. James as Nagar Baul and Ayub Bachchu leading LRB particularly gained success experimenting with blues rock. The folk rock music made a comeback when Dalchhut proved their respect and ability to do folk song as a rock band in Bangladesh. Later Aurthohin, Bangla, Chirkutt and Shironamhin joined this trend. Arnob and Shironamhin with their poetic songs incorporating philosophical and experimental elements in their music, began to develop Bangladeshi rock in an artistic manner.

=== Cinema ===
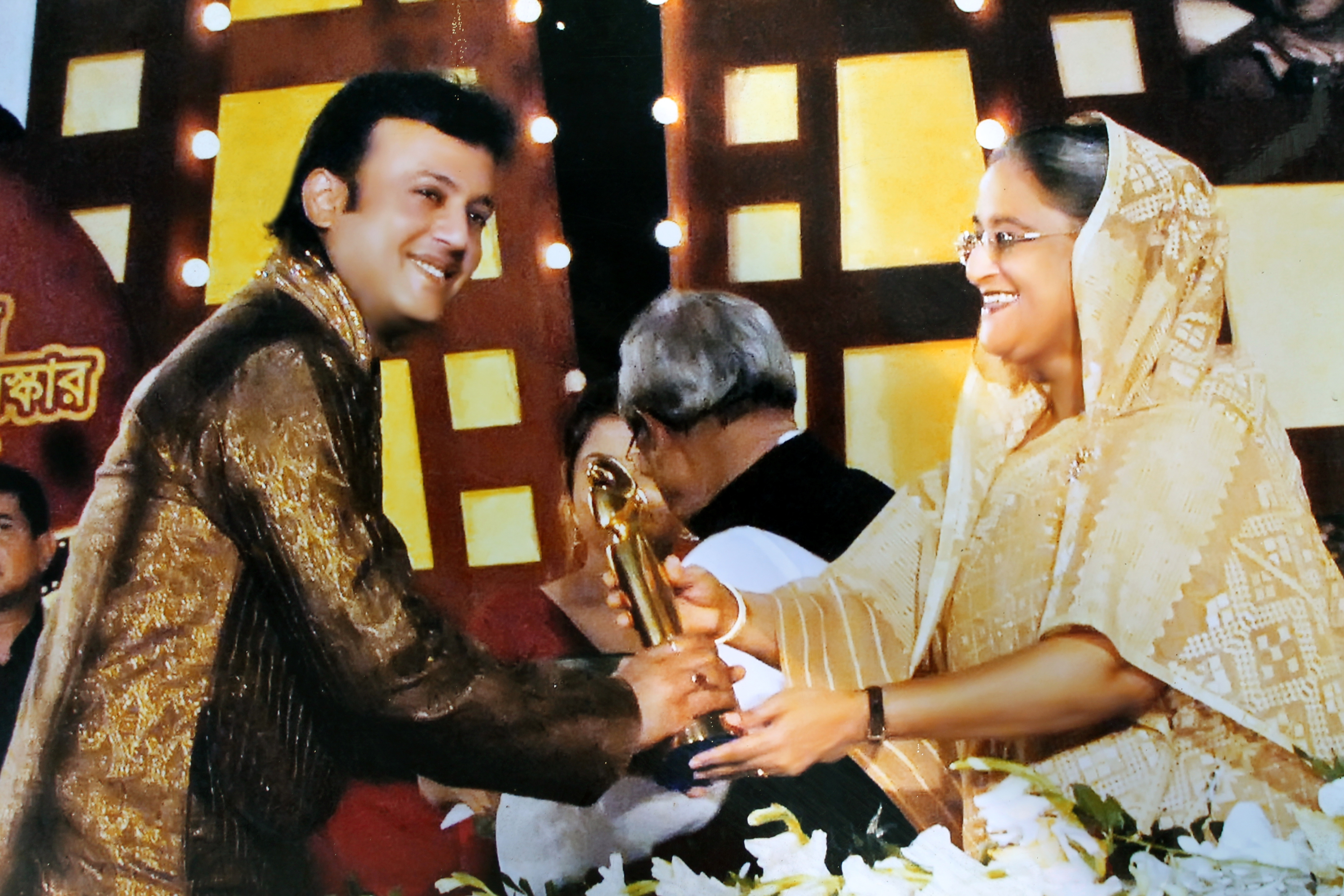
Riaz receiving National Award 2008 from Prime Minister Sheikh Hasina in 2010

During the 2000s, most Bangladeshi films underperformed commercially and Bangladesh produced about 100 low-budget movies a year. Viewership of Bangladeshi films in general dropped, and the industry was criticized for producing low-quality films whose only appeal was that of cheap melodrama.

After a drastic decline in the 2000s, the Bangladeshi film industry tried to bounce back after 2006–07. With the help of the Bangladeshi Government and the emergence of big production companies, the Bangladeshi film industry started growing slowly.

Among the successful films that released in the 2000s are Ammajan, Premer Taj Mahal, Wrong Number, Shasti, Shyamol Chhaya, Hridoyer Kotha, Daruchini Dwip, Monpura, Priya Amar Priya, Koti Takar Kabin, Chacchu, Khairun Sundori, Amar Praner Swami, Pitar Ason, Tumi Swapno Tumi Shadhona, Mone Prane Acho Tumi, Amar Shopno Tumi, Bolbo Kotha Bashor Ghore, among others. Besides critically acclaimed films like Kittonkhola, Lalsalu, Hason Raja, Matir Moyna, Bachelor, Joyjatra, Hajar Bachhor Dhore, Ghani and Chandragrohon were produced in this decade. Most of the successful films during this period starred Manna (until his death in 2008) followed by Shakib Khan, Riaz, and Ferdous Ahmed. Leading female actors included Moushumi, Shabnur, Popy and Champa.

=== Television ===
Bangladesh Television (BTV) was the sole television broadcaster in Bangladesh until the launch of ATN Bangla on satellite television in 1997, and Ekushey Television on terrestrial in 2000. But as competition grew over the years, BTV declined and stagnated, and privately owned television channels gained more popularity among locals. Besides a host of international channels were now available to Bangladeshi television audience. This led to a huge transformation in the taste and behaviour of the television viewership. Viewers were no longer constrained for options, and the program producers had to face steep competition to capture the attention of the audience.

Most notable among the private channels was Ekushey Television (ETV) which officially began transmissions on 14 April 2000, as the country's first privately owned terrestrial television network, and then immediately gained widespread popularity. It had also helped with the prevention of the massive spread of Indian television channels in the country. Some of Ekushey's popular programs include Mukto Khabor, Bandhan, and Deshjure. Ekushey's news programming has also been considered to be unbiased and reliable. Two other older private channels namely ATN Bangla and Channel i also started telecasting news and news based program from the beginning of the decade.

In March 2002, Ekushey Television was accused by the BNP-led government of Bangladesh for airing news reports against them and was also declared at fault by the High Court for operating under an illegal license, and hence was shut down on 29 August 2002. Even after ETV was shut down, private TV channels including newly introduced ones continued to enjoy increasing viewership among the urban audience, while BTV as the sole terrestrial television network, remained the only channel available for audience of rural areas where satellite transmission was unavailable.

Drama serials and stand along drama programs continued to enjoy high popularity as the form of entertainment. Humayun Ahmed, Imdadul Huq Milon, Salahuddin Lavlu, Mostofa Sarwar Farooki, Redoan Rony, Anisul Hoque were among the popular drama writers/producers and some of the most successful drama serials included "Ekannoborti", " House Full", "Ronger Manush" and so on. While the successful TV actors from earlier decade like Taukir Ahmed, Bipasha Hayat and Zahid Hasan continued to perform in the leading roles, a new group of performers like Mosharraf Karim, Chanchal Chowdhury, Sumaiya Shimu, Nusrat Imroz Tisha gained popularity in this decade. Late night talk shows like "Tritio Matra" and Infotainment programs like Hridoye Mati O Manush and various travel and cooking programs also became popular.

=== Sports ===
Bangladesh achieved significant milestones in various sports in the 2000s decade. In cricket, Bangladesh became a full member of International Cricket Council (ICC) in 2000 and the recognition helped cement cricket's position as the most popular game in the country as football was gradually losing ground due to relatively poor performance at international level.

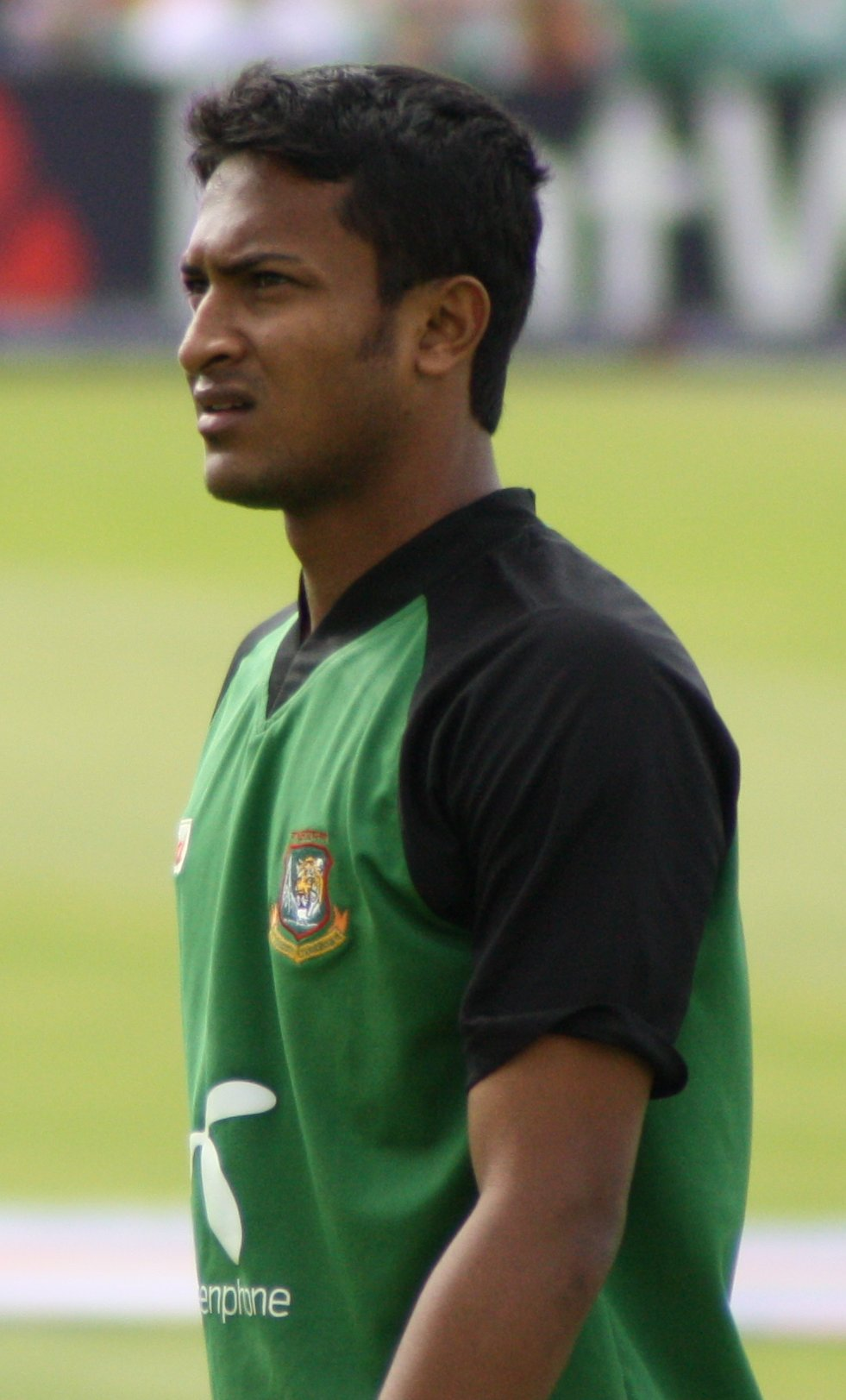
Shakib Al Hasan captained Bangladesh during their historic Test series win against West Indies in 2009.

On 13 November 2000, Bangladesh played their inaugural Test match, hosting India in Dhaka - in which India won by 9 wickets. The country's main domestic competition, the National Cricket League (NCL), began in 1999–2000 and in 2000–01, its second season, the NCL became a first-class competition. However, as the youngest test playing nation Bangladesh struggled in the top tier of the game. Between 2001 and 2004, the national team suffered from heavy defeats in international matches. They also suffered from 5 heavy defeats and 1 no results in 2003 Cricket World Cup. Then between 2004 and 2010 Bangladesh secured some memorable one-off victories but they continued to suffer from lack of consistency. India toured Bangladesh in December 2004. In 2nd ODI of the series, Bangladesh defeated India in its hundredth ODI, this being only the third time that it had won against a Test playing nation. In January 2005, Zimbabwe toured Bangladesh and on the first match, Bangladesh secured their maiden victory in Test cricket. Later in the year Bangladesh participated in a triangular ODI series with England and Australia. Bangladesh won just one match out of six, but their 5-wicket victory at Cardiff was against an Australian side that at the time were world champions in what Wisden described as "the greatest upset in 2,250 one-day internationals". Later in 2007 World Cup, hosted by the West Indies, Bangladesh secured a five-wicket win over India. The surprise result was enough for them to secure qualification for the second round while India was knocked out. Bangladesh secured another memorable victory in the Super Eights against South Africa, but was not able to progress any further. After the world-cup Bangladesh again plunged into a series of lacluster performances. They came out of the losing streak during their tour to the West Indies in 2009. Against a relatively weakened WI team Bangladesh went on to achieved their first overseas Test series victory followed by ODI series win. The tour saw the rise of Shakib Al Hasan as one of the leading allrounders of the game. In November, Shakib was named The Wisden Cricketer's "Test Player of the Year".

The decade saw notable results in other games as well. In football, Bangladesh achieved the best results at South Asian level where they won the South Asian Football Federation Gold Cup 2003 and were gold medalists in South Asian Games for the second time in 2010. In shooting, Asif Hossain Khan clinched a gold medal at 2002 Commonwealth Games and later another silver in a team even in the 2006 version of the game. In chess, Bangladesh produced several grandmasters such as Ziaur Rahman, Reefat Bin-Sattar, Abdullah Al Rakib and Enamul Hossain who competed at international levels and won various titles.

== See also ==
Years in Bangladesh in the decade of

2000s
2000
2001
2002
2003
2004
2005
2006
2007
2008
2009
