= List of Bangladeshi films of 2005 =

This is a list of Bangladeshi films that were released in 2005.

== Releases ==
Opening	Title	Director	Cast	Genre	Notes	Ref.
14 May	Agun Amar Naam	Swapon Chowdhury	Masum Parvez Rubel, Poly, Misha Showdagor, Shahidul Islam Shacchu	Action		
3 June	Banglar Bagh	Ahmed Nasir	Masum Parvez Rubel, Poly, Rehana Joly; Misha Showdagor	Action		
3 June	Hajar Bachhor Dhore	Kohinur Akter Suchanda	Riaz, Shashi, Shahnoor, Shuchonda; ATM Shamsuzzaman	Drama	Based on Zahir Raihan's novel of the same title	
1 July	Amar Shopno Tumi	Hasibul Islam Mizan	Shakib Khan, Shabnur, Ferdous, Abul Hayat, A.T.M. Shamsuzzaman	Romance		
29 July	City Terror	M A Rahim	Manna, Popy, Shakib Khan	Action		
4 October	Kal Sokale	Amzad Hossain	Shabnur, Ferdous Ahmed, Apu Biswas; Parveen Sultana Diti	Drama		
4 October	Molla Barir Bou	Salauddin Lavlu	Riaz, Shabnur, Moushumi, ATM Shamsuzzaman, Khairul Alam Sabuj	Comedy, drama		
4 October	Momtaz	Uttam Akash	Momtaz Begum, Humayun Faridi, Helal Khan, Anwara, Prabir Mitra	Drama		
4 November	Taka: The Ultimate Magic	Shahidul Islam Khokon	Riaz, Purnima, Sohel Rana, Humayun Faridi	Action		
15 November	Shyamol Chhaya	Humayun Ahmed	Humayun Faridi, Riaz, Meher Afroz Shaon	Drama, war, history	Based on Bangladesh Liberation War	
	Bishakto Chokh: The Blue Eye	Masum Parvez Rubel	Riaz, Shahara, Rubel	Action		
	Chotto Ektu Bhalobasha	G. Sarker	Riaz, Purnima	Romance		
	Bhalobasha Bhalobasha	Mohammad Hannan	Riaz, Shabnur	Romance		
	Dhakaiya Pola Barishaler Maiya	Uttam Akash	Shakib Khan, Shabnur, Humayun Faridi	Romance, comedy		
	Somadhi		Shakib Khan, Shabnur, Amin Khan, Jillur Rahman, Anwara	Romance		
	Bhalobashar Dushmon'	Wakil Ahmed	Shakib Khan, Shabnur	Romance		
	Ek Buk Jala	Shahin Sumon	Shakib Khan, Suveccha	Romance		

== See also ==
- 2005 in Bangladesh
- List of Bangladeshi films
- Cinema of Bangladesh
