= 2002 in Bangladesh =

- Centuries: 20th; 21st
- Decades: 1980s; 1990s; 2000s; 2010s; 2020s
- See also: Other events of 2002; List of years in Bangladesh

2002 (MMII) was a common year starting on Tuesday of the Gregorian calendar, the 2002nd year of the Common Era (CE) and Anno Domini (AD) designations, the 2nd year of the 3rd millennium and the 21st century, and the 3rd year of the 2000s decade.

The year 2002 was the 31st year after the independence of Bangladesh, and the second year of the third term of the government of Khaleda Zia.

== Incumbents ==
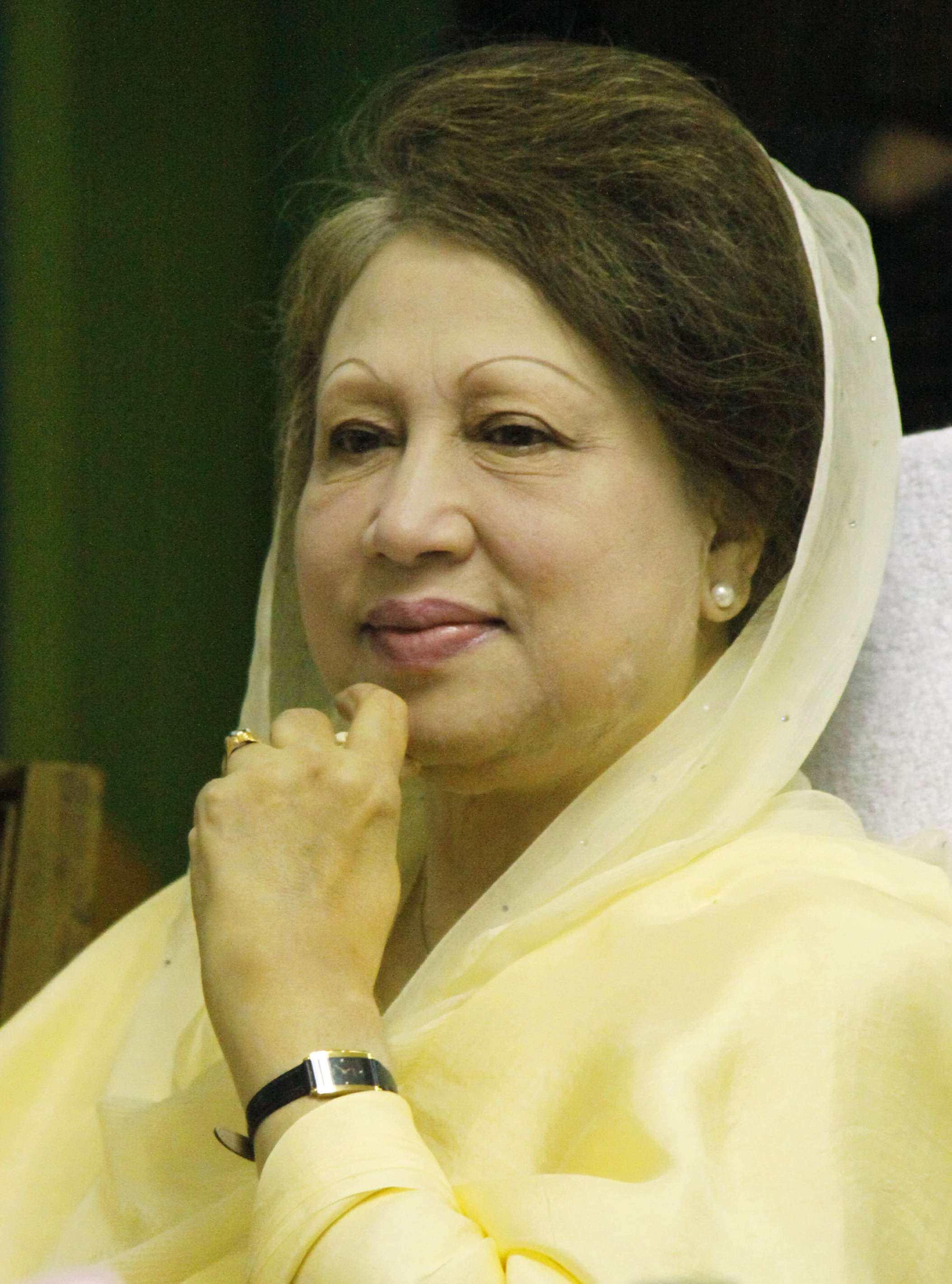
Khaleda
Zia

- President:
  - until 21 June: Badruddoza Chowdhury
  - 21 June – 6 September: Muhammad Jamiruddin Sircar (acting)
  - starting 6 September: Iajuddin Ahmed
- Prime Minister: Khaleda Zia
- Chief Justice: Mahmudul Amin Choudhury (until 17 June), Mainur Reza Choudhury (starting 18 June)

== Demography ==
Demographic Indicators for Bangladesh in 2002
Population, total	132,478,077
Population density (per km^{2})	1017.7
Population growth (annual %)	1.8%
Male to Female Ratio (every 100 Female)	105.5
Urban population (% of total)	24.8%
Birth rate, crude (per 1,000 people)	26.1
Death rate, crude (per 1,000 people)	6.6
Mortality rate, under 5 (per 1,000 live births)	77
Life expectancy at birth, total (years)	66.4
Fertility rate, total (births per woman)	3.0

== Climate ==
Climate data for Bangladesh in 2002
Month	Jan	Feb	Mar	Apr	May	Jun	Jul	Aug	Sep	Oct	Nov	Dec	Year
Daily mean °C (°F)	18.9 (66.0)	21.7 (71.1)	25.6 (78.1)	27.3 (81.1)	28.1 (82.6)	28.1 (82.6)	27.9 (82.2)	27.9 (82.2)	28.1 (82.6)	27.0 (80.6)	23.9 (75.0)	20.2 (68.4)	25.4 (77.7)
Average precipitation mm (inches)	17.2 (0.68)	1.5 (0.06)	49.2 (1.94)	185.0 (7.28)	123.9 (4.88)	611.4 (24.07)	589.9 (23.22)	347.9 (13.70)	231.6 (9.12)	50.6 (1.99)	109.7 (4.32)	0.3 (0.01)	2,318.2 (91.27)
Source: Climatic Research Unit (CRU) of University of East Anglia (UEA)

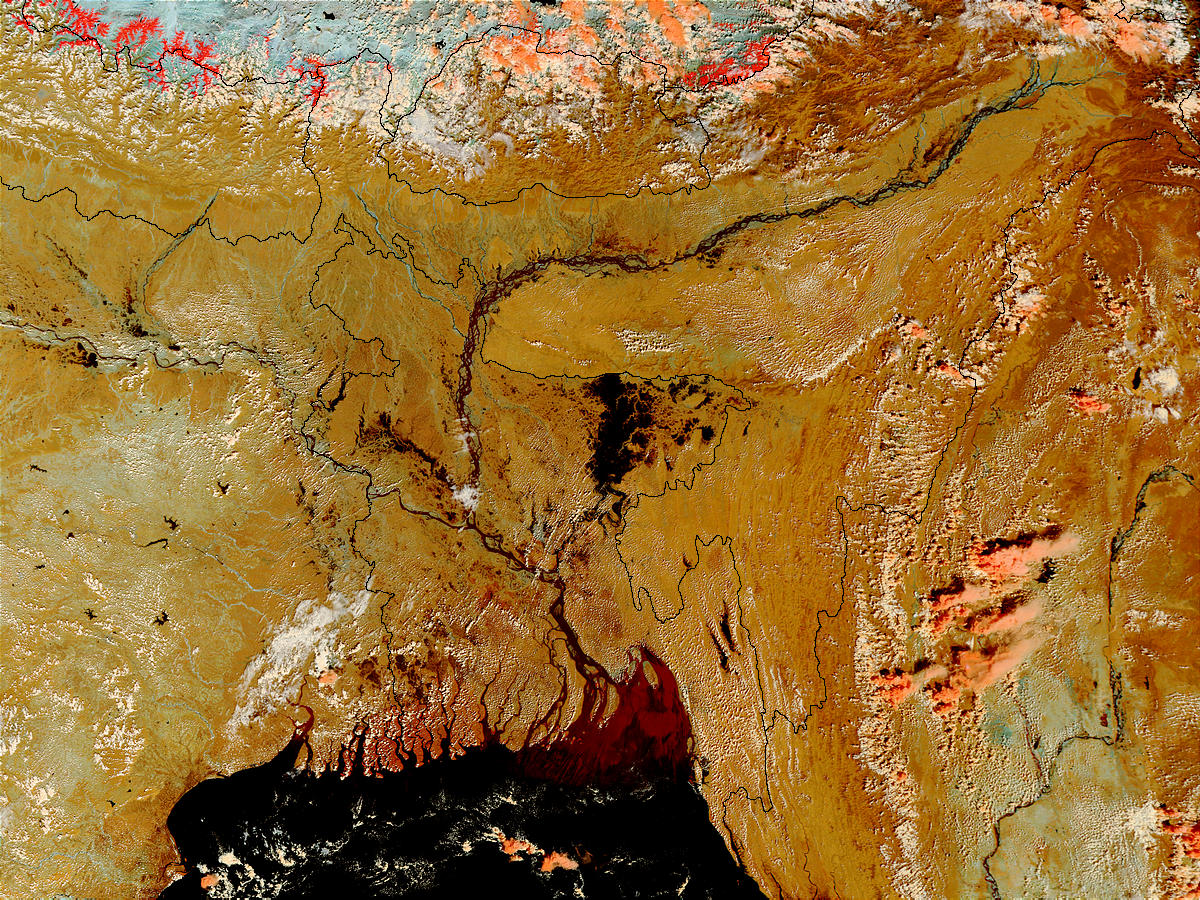
True-color image from NASA shows extent of flood on 5 August 2002.

=== Flood ===
In late summer 2002, heavy monsoon rains led to massive flooding in eastern India, Nepal, and Bangladesh, killing over 500 people and leaving millions homeless. There were an estimated 3.5 million victims of flooding in 30 out of 64 districts. Continuous heavy rainfall and water from the Meghalay hills in India had caused the flash floods.

== Economy ==
Key Economic Indicators for Bangladesh in 2002
National Income
	Current US$	Current BDT	% of GDP
GDP	$54.7 billion	BDT3,142.8 billion	
GDP growth (annual %)	3.8%		
GDP per capita	$413.1	BDT23,723	
Agriculture, value added	$11.3 billion	BDT646.9 billion	20.6%
Industry, value added	$12.5 billion	BDT717.8 billion	22.8%
Services, etc., value added	$28.2 billion	BDT1,620.8 billion	51.6%
Balance of Payment
	Current US$	Current BDT	% of GDP
Current account balance	$0.7 billion		1.4%
Imports of goods and services	$9.1 billion	BDT520.4 billion	16.6%
Exports of goods and services	$6,885.0 million	BDT390.0 billion	12.4%
Foreign direct investment, net inflows	$52.3 million		0.1%
Personal remittances, received	$2,858.1 million		5.2%
Total reserves (includes gold) at year end	$1,721.7 million		
Total reserves in months of imports	2.2		

Note: For the year 2002, average official exchange rate for BDT was 57.89 per US$.

== Events ==
- 1 January – The government of Bangladesh banned the sale of polyethylene bags in the capital, Dhaka, for environmental reasons.
- 5 February – The Government of Bangladesh introduces a maximum sentence of death for acid attacks.
- 10 February – Clash broke out between bandits and Bangladesh Police in Tejgaon. Bangladesh Police arrested 25 bandits.
- 3 May – A ferry named MV Salahuddin-2 sank in the Meghna River south of Dhaka, Bangladesh, leading to the deaths of more than 450 people.
- 8 June – Sabekun Nahar Sonny, a student of BUET, was killed in a crossfire between factions of Bangladesh Jatiotabadi Chatra Dal.
- 23 July – Bangladesh Police raids Shamsunnahar Hall, the women's dorm, of University of Dhaka.
- 29 August – According to the annual survey by Transparency International, Bangladesh is amongst the most corrupt nations, along with Indonesia, and neighbours India and Pakistan.
- 16 October - An anti-crime operation named "Operation Clean Heart" carried out by Bangladesh Army, Bangladesh Navy, Bangladesh Rifles, Bangladesh Police and Bangladesh Ansar members in Bangladesh started.
- 10 November - Model Tinni was found dead.
- 1 December – 30 people die in Gaibandha in a stampede when a mill owner opened the gates of his house to distribute food to the poor.
- 6 December - Coordinated bombing of four movie theaters caused in the deaths of 27 people and injured over 200 others in Mymensingh, Bangladesh.

=== Awards and Recognitions ===
==== Independence Day Award ====
Recipients	Area	Note
Hasan Hafizur Rahman	literature	
Barin Majumder	music	
Abdul Latif	music	
S. A. Bari	liberation war	
Dhaka Ahsania Mission	social work	organization

==== Ekushey Padak ====
1. Sufia Ahmed, flourishing culture and Language Movement
2. Gazi Mazharul Anwar, music
3. Abul Kalam Azad, education (posthumously)
4. Abdul Hamid Khan Bhashani, Language Movement (posthumously)
5. Ahmed Sofa, literature (posthumously)
6. Monzur Hossain, Language Movement (posthumously)
7. Sharif Hossain, education
8. Serajur Rahman, journalism
9. Abdur Jabbar Khan, film (posthumously)
10. Sadek Khan, Language Movement and film
11. Kazi Golam Mahbub, Language Movement
12. Pratibha Mutsuddi, education
13. Muhammad Shahidullah, literature and Language Movement (posthumously)
14. Ramesh Shil, Gano Sangeet (posthumously)

=== Sports ===
- Asian Games:
  - Bangladesh participated in the 2002 Asian Games held in Busan, South Korea. Bangladesh national kabaddi team won silver medal in kabaddi.
- Commonwealth Games:
  - Bangladesh participated in the 2002 Commonwealth Games held in Manchester, England. Shooter Asif Hossain Khan won gold in 10 m Air rifle individual event.
- Domestic football:
  - Mohammedan SC won 2002 Dhaka Premier Division League title while Abahani KC became runner-up.
- Cricket:
  - The Pakistani national cricket team toured Bangladesh in January 2002 and played a two-match Test series against the Bangladeshi national cricket team. Pakistan won the Test series 2–0. In addition, the teams played a three-match series of Limited Overs Internationals (LOI) which Pakistan won 3–0.
  - In August, Bangladesh toured Sri Lanka and played 3 ODIs and 2 test matches. This was followed by 2002 ICC Champions Trophy in which Bangladesh played 2 ODIs against Australia and New Zealand. Bangladesh lost all these matches.
  - In October, Bangladesh toured South Africa for another bi-lateral series of 3 ODIs and 2 test matches. Bangladesh could not win any of these matches either.
  - Later in December, the West Indies team visited Bangladesh and played two Test matches and three limited overs internationals. They won both the Test matches and two of the One Day Internationals, while the remaining ODI was a no result.
- Chess:
  - Grandmaster Ziaur Rahman earned his GM title.

== Deaths ==
- 17 February – Ehtesham, film director (b. 1927)
- 18 June – Nilima Ibrahim, academic, author (b. 1921)
- 28 July – Syed Ali Ahsan, poet (b. 1920)
- 13 October – Ila Mitra, peasant movement organizer (b. 1925)
- 2 October – Kazi Abdul Kader, politician (b. 1916)

== See also ==
- 2000s in Bangladesh
- List of Bangladeshi films of 2002
- Timeline of Bangladeshi history
