= October 2005 Bangladesh court bombing =

Bombing by Islamic terrorists

2005 October Bangladesh court bombing
- Location: Chandpur and Lakshmipur
- Date: (UTC+06:00)
- Attack type: Triple murder; bomb attack; terrorism
- Deaths: 3
- Injuries: 34
- Perpetrator: Jamaat-ul-Mujahideen Bangladesh

The 2005 October Bangladesh court bombing was a synchronized bombing on 3 October 2005 that targeted courts in Chandpur and Lakshmipur districts and resulted in 2 deaths and 34 injuries. It was carried out by Jamaat-ul-Mujahideen Bangladesh, an Islamist terrorist organisation that opposed the secular judiciary and legal system in Bangladesh.

== Attacks ==
=== Chandpur ===
One person was killed in the bombing targeting the Chandpur court. Two suspects were arrested from the bombing site. The suspects had leaflets in their possession calling for Sharia law and admitted being members of Jamaat-ul-Mujahideen Bangladesh.

=== Lakshmipur ===
One person was killed and six injured in the attack in Lakshmipur. Judge Abu Sufian was the target of the attack. The bomb was hidden inside a legal book. The judge escaped unhurt.

=== Chittagong ===
On 3 October 2005, terrorists snuck a bomb into the courtroom of the Additional District Judge of Chittagong. They hurled the bomb at judge Dilzar Hossain and magistrate Akram Hossain. The bomb failed to detonate and no one was injured. Lawyers and police personnel present in the court subdued the two terrorists, Abdul Malek Laltu and Shahadat Ali, who then police then arrested.

== Trial ==
A Chittagong court sentenced 3 Jamaat-ul-Mujahideen Bangladesh militants to 14 years imprisonment including bombmaker Zahidul Islam alias Boma Mizan on 26 September 2017. Mizan was broken out along with two other JMB militants when they was being transported to jail on 23 February 2014. Except for Boma Mizan the other two accused were in custody and present at the sentencing.

For the bombing in Lakshmipur JMB militant Masumur Rahman Masum was sentenced to death. His death was confirmed by the Bangladesh Supreme Court on 6 April 2016 and sentenced Amjad Ali to the life imprisonment on 12 April 2016.
