= 2005 Netrokona bombing =

Terrorist incident in Bangladesh

Coordinates: 24.8831°N 90.7348°E

- Location: Netrokona, Bangladesh
- Date: 8 December 2005
- Target: Bangladesh Udichi Shilpigoshthi
- Attack type: Mass murder; bomb attack; terrorism
- Deaths: 8
- Injuries: 50
- Perpetrator: Jamaat-ul-Mujahideen Bangladesh

The 2005 Netrokona bombing was a suicide bomb attack on 8 December 2005 in Netrokona, Bangladesh that resulted in the deaths of eight people. It took place mid-morning outside the offices of Bangladesh Udichi Shilpigoshthi, a secular cultural organisation.

In 2008, three Jama'atul Mujahideen Bangladesh (JMB) militants were sentenced, one in absentia, for planning the attack. One was executed in 2021.

== Attack ==
At about 9:40 am on 8 December 2005, a bomb was discovered in front of the offices of Bangladesh Udichi Shilpigoshthi, a secular cultural organisation. The fire brigade attempted to defuse it, but it went off, injuring three people. After a crowd gathered, a suicide bomber detonated a second bomb at about 10:30 am. Two people perished at the scene. Two more died at Netrokona Sadar Hospital, and four died in Mymensingh Medical College Hospital. Fifty were injured. Among the fatalities were two officials of the Netrokona district Udichi: joint convenor Khaja Haider Hossain and organising secretary Sudipta Paul Shelly.

== Investigation and trial ==
Suspicion immediately focused on militant organization Jama'atul Mujahideen Bangladesh (JMB). They had previously threatened to bomb institutions, and a JMB leaflet was found at the scene. On the day of the bombing, State Minister for Home Affairs Lutfozzaman Babar blamed the attack on a Hindu man, Yadav Das, who was killed by the explosion. Babar's claim was criticised by both the local people and the opposition Awami League.

Initial evidence suggested that the second bomb was set off by a man with a bicycle who died in the explosion. In the first days after the attack there was uncertainty about whether there had been one perpetrator or two. By then, police had narrowed their search for the bomber to three suspects, all killed in the blast. A week after the bombing, Babar rescinded his premature statement and said the investigation found that Das was innocent.

Two JMB members, Asaduzzaman Chowdhury alias Panir and Salahuddin alias Salehin, were arrested in Mymensingh District on 18 December 2005 during a raid by the Rapid Action Battalion in which explosives were recovered. Along with a third JMB man, Yunus Ali, who was tried in absentia, they were convicted for planning the attack. On 17 February 2008, the three were sentenced to death. Asaduzzaman appealed to the High Court, and after his appeal was rejected in 2014, to the Supreme Court of Bangladesh. On 23 March 2016, it upheld his death sentence. He was executed by hanging at Kashimpur High Security Central Jail on 15 July 2021. Salehin was sprung from a prison van in February 2014, and remains at large as of April 2022.

== Reactions ==
The district unit of the Awami League, then in opposition, called a daylong hartal (strike) on 10 December to protest the attack. The bombing was condemned by Workers' Party President Rashed Khan Menon, who said the government would be ineffective against militants as long as Islamist party Jamaat-e-Islami was part of the ruling coalition. The attack was also condemned by Jatiya Samajtantrik Dal President Hasanul Haq Inu, the Communist Party of Bangladesh, Bikalpa Dhara Bangladesh, and other organizations. The Supreme Court Bar Association visited the surviving victims on 18 December 2005 and called for the government to provide compensation.
