= Chhatak Cement Factory =

Factory in Bangladesh

- Type: Public limited
- Industry: Cement
- Founded: 1937
- Headquarters: Sylhet, Bangladesh
- Production output: 0.23 million tonnes of Cement
- Parent: Bangladesh Chemical Industries Corporation (BCIC)

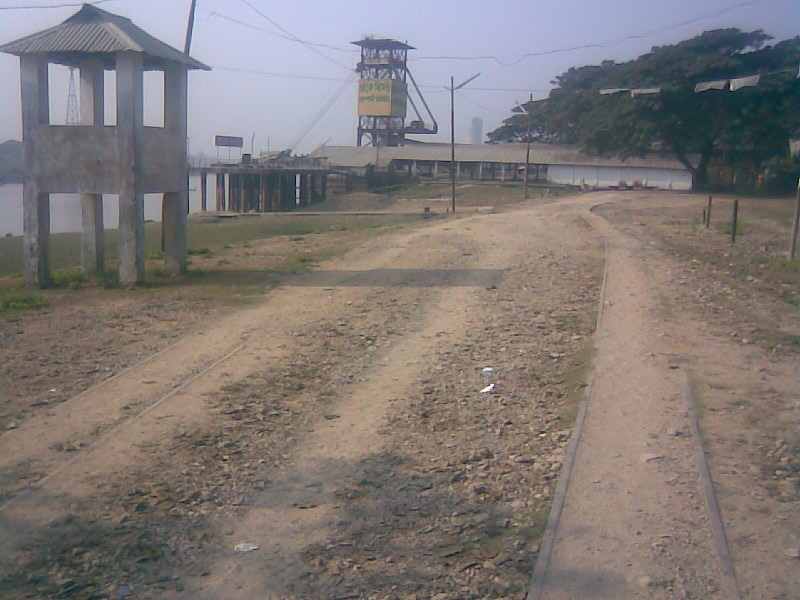
Chhatak Cement Factory

Chhatak Cement Factory (Bengali: ছাতক সিমেন্ট কোম্পানি) also known as Chhatak Cement Company Limited or simply Chhatak Cement is the first and oldest cement factory in Bangladesh. It is located on the bank of Surma River in Chhatak Upazila of Sylhet. It was established in 1937 as Assam Bengal Cement Company. The annual production capacity is 203,000 metric tons. Its raw material, limestone is imported from Meghalaya, India and stone is also collected from Takerghat's own stone quarry. Chhatak Cement is exported to Assam.

== Location ==
Chhatak Cement Factory is situated in Chhatak Upazila of Sunamganj district. It is 32 km away from Sylhet.

== History ==
It was established in 1937 as a private company when it was named Assam Bengal Cement Company. After the Indo-Pakistani War of 1965, when the factory was abandoned by the private owner, it came under the control of Pakistan Industrial Development Corporation in 1966. After the independence of Bangladesh, it came under the control of the BMOGC, later the BMEDC, and lastly from 1 July 1982 it was handed over to BCIC.

== See also ==
- Economy of Sylhet
