= Chhatak Gas Field =

Natural gas field in Bangladesh

- Country: Bangladesh
- Region: Sunamganj
- Offshore/onshore: onshore

Field history
- Discovery: 1959

Chhatak Gas Field (Bengali: ছাতক গ্যাসক্ষেত্র) is a natural gas field located in Chhatak Upazila, Sunamganj District, Bangladesh. This company is under the control of Sylhet Gas Field Company Limited (SGFL). For the first time in Bangladesh, gas connection was provided to the industrial sector from this gas field in 1959. In 1960, it provided approximately 4 million cubic feet of gas per day to Chhatak Cement Factory as well as Sylhet Pulp and Paper Mills.

== Location ==
Chhatak gas field is located in Chhatak Upazila, Sunamganj district of Sylhet Division, about 300 km northeast of the capital Dhaka. This gas field is basically operated as two different gas fields - Chhatak (East) and Tangrtila or Chhatak (West) - which were merged into a single field after 2001.

== Explosion ==
Two explosions have occurred at the gas field. One of them happened on January 7 2005, and the second happened on June 24 of the same year.

== See also ==
- List of natural gas fields in Bangladesh
- Bangladesh Gas Fields Company Limited
- Sylhet Gas Fields Limited
- Gas Transmission Company Limited
