= One-Day Internationals in England in 2005 =

Cricket matches

Thirteen One Day Internationals were played in England in 2005 - 10 in the NatWest Series between England, Bangladesh and Australia, and three between England and Australia in the NatWest Challenge immediately following the Series.

== NatWest Series ==
=== Group stage ===
==== England v Bangladesh (16 June) ====
16 June
Scorecard

Bangladesh; 190 (45.2 overs)	v	England; 192/0 (24.5 overs)
Aftab Ahmed 51 (58); SJ Harmison 4/39 [10]		ME Trescothick 100* (76)

England won by 10 wickets
The Oval, London
Umpires: Aleem Dar (Pak) and MR Benson (Eng)
Player of the match: ME Trescothick (Eng)

- England won the toss and elected to field.
- J Lewis (Eng) made his ODI debut.
- Marcus Trescothick (Eng) played in his 100th ODI and became the first batsman for England to score a century in his 100th ODI
- Points: England 6, Bangladesh 0

Amid rains at The Oval, Jon Lewis had a stunning ODI debut for the England cricket team against Bangladesh, removing Javed Omar and Mohammad Ashraful with successive deliveries before taking out Nafees Iqbal in a good opening spell. Admittedly, it was aided by cloudy skies, which gave Lewis plenty of swing - his main threat - but it was still a decent return for the debutant. Steve Harmison was his usual erratic self, going for nine off the first five balls of an over before removing Tushar Imran with a ball that was gloved onto the stumps just before the end of 15 overs, making it 57 for 4. Habibul Bashar, the highest averaging Bangladesh batsman, gloved a short ball from Harmison to a diving Geraint Jones, and he was on his way for 19 - Bangladesh now 72 for 5. Lewis actually bowled his ten overs straight, ending with three for 32, as the last over was just an exercise in defending from the visitors. Wicketkeeper Khaled Mashud was next to go, attempting a pull off a poor ball down the legside, for 1. However, a solid recovery from Aftab Ahmed and Mohammad Rafique slowly gave the Bangladeshis a chance, before rain intervened again after 30 overs.

Coming back from the rain break, Aftab and Rafique continued to smack the England bowlers, particularly Paul Collingwood, but eventually Rafique gave a chance to Harmison at long leg and the Bangladeshis were seven down for 152. And only a couple of overs later, Aftab was out in a close run-out decision, for 51. Khaled Mahmud then went for a golden duck, playing a poor shot to a short ball from Harmison, his fourth wicket of the day. However, Nazmul Hossain and Mashrafe Mortaza frustrated the English bowlers, with Darren Gough eventually ending the resistance as he got Nazmul for 6 to end the innings for 190. However, the Bangladeshis offered no resistance in the bowling, as only Mortaza was hit for less than six an over. Marcus Trescothick hit his ninth One Day International century off just 76 balls, Andrew Strauss supplied with a level-headed 82, and ten extras added up to a total of 192. The winning runs - a four from Strauss - were hit inside 25 overs and with all ten wickets to spare.

==== Australia v Bangladesh (18 June) ====
18 June
Scorecard

Australia; 249/5 (50 overs)	v	Bangladesh; 250/5 (49.2 overs)
DR Martyn 77 (112); Tapash Baisya 3/69 [10]		Mohammad Ashraful 100 (101); JN Gillespie 2/41 [9.2]

Bangladesh won by 5 wickets
Sophia Gardens, Cardiff
Umpires: BF Bowden (NZ) and DR Shepherd (Eng)
Player of the match: Mohammad Ashraful (Ban)

- Australia won the toss and elected to bat.
- Points: Bangladesh 5, Australia 1

Perhaps, the biggest upset in the history of limited overs cricket, Mashrafe Mortaza shocked the Sophia Gardens crowd when he had Adam Gilchrist plumb on the second ball of the second ODI, taking the first Australian wicket without a run yet on the scoreboard - and it was to set the tone of the match. Most people would have expected Australia to swamp Bangladesh, especially after the 10-wicket defeat the Bangladeshi Tigers endured in the opening match with England, but a maiden from Mortaza gave them some hope, at least. Things looked to be going the right way for Australia when Matthew Hayden took a boundary off Tapash Baisya, but another maiden followed, and in the sixth over Ricky Ponting padded up to Tapash Baisya - resulting in an lbw decision given, and Australia were - incredibly - 9 for 2. Cautious batting from Hayden and Damien Martyn followed, but some expensive bowling from Baisya relinquished the initiative, as Australia recovered somewhat. They survived through 15 overs, Hayden being caught off a no-ball from Tapash, but in the 16th, he was bowled by Nazmul Hossain for 37 off an inside edge, just as Hayden were looking to get himself in. Some economical bowling from Mohammad Rafique who bowled ten overs for 31 runs, along with excellent bowling from Mortaza at the death, resulted in Australia finishing on 249 for 5, losing Martyn to Baisya for 77 and Clarke to the same man for 54. In fact, Michael Hussey with 31 not out off 21 balls and Simon Katich with 36 not out off 23 ensured that they got a competitive target.

That was not all, however. The chase began very sedately, only Tushar Imran looking to take runs as he smashed Brad Hogg about, but Hogg got his revenge when Tushar was out for 24, lofting to Katich. Earlier, Nafees Iqbal had gone for 8, and with Javed Omar out as the third man to fall, for 19 off 51 balls, it looked to be business as usual for Bangladesh. But this match had more tricks up its sleeve. Hogg and Clarke leaked runs like a drain, six wides were bowled, and Mohammad Ashraful showed another glimpse of why he's been called Bangladesh's finest batsman. As he made the second ODI hundred in the Bangladesh team's history, he forged a massive 130-run partnership with Habibul Bashar, and had a great two hours at the crease (although dropped on 54) - before picking out Jason Gillespie at long on to be out for exactly 100. Bangladesh still needed 23 runs off 17 balls, but Aftab Ahmed continued his fine form from the Oval match with England, as he first took a leg bye off Ashraful, then gave the strike to Rafique, who smashed a cover driven four before taking another legbye. A four and a dot-ball finished a 10-run over, meaning that Bangladesh now needed only 13 off 12 balls. A good over from McGrath followed, as he conceded only six runs - including an edged four from Rafique. With the last over, Bangladesh needed seven runs, and Ahmed swung the first ball of the over to midwicket for six. Thus, it became a formality - Bangladesh won with four balls and five wickets to spare, almost convincing in today's cricket, and the result meant that the Aussies needed a victory over England at Bristol the following day to have any chance of winning the group stage.

==== England v Australia (19 June) ====
19 June
Scorecard

Australia; 252/9 (50 overs)	v	England; 253/7 (47.3 overs)
MEK Hussey 84 (83); SJ Harmison 5/33 [10]		KP Pietersen 91* (65); GB Hogg 3/42 [10]

England won by 3 wickets
County Ground, Bristol
Umpires: Aleem Dar (Pak) and JW Lloyds (Eng)
Player of the match: KP Pietersen (Eng)

- Australia won the toss and elected to bat.
- Points: England 5, Australia 1

Ricky Ponting chose to bat when he won the toss for the visiting Australian cricket team in an extremely tense and see-sawing match at The County Ground, Bristol. It looked like a great decision when Jon Lewis and Darren Gough were smashed about early on, as Australia made their way to 57 for 0 after 11 overs with Adam Gilchrist and Matthew Hayden taking sixes off Lewis over midwicket. However, with the entrance of Steve Harmison, everything changed. In his third over - the twelfth of the game, he removed Gilchrist with a bouncy ball that the batsman edged behind, then Ponting with a yorker that he didn't play at - resulting in lbw - then a dot ball, and then Martyn with a slog shot to Pietersen at third man. Australia tried to consolidate, but when Hayden tried to hit out off Harmison four overs later, Paul Collingwood jumped up to pick the ball out of the air with his right hand - a magnificent catch, and Australia had lost four wickets for six runs, reminiscent of their collapse in the Twenty20 match earlier on in the week.

Australia dug themselves out of the hole, however, Michael Clarke and Michael Hussey slowly accumulating to increase the rate. England clearly lacked a fifth-bowler, opting instead for Vikram Solanki to bat down the order, so they used a combination of Michael Vaughan, Solanki and Collingwood to get through their ten required overs. That let Australia off the hook, with Clarke and Hussey adding 105, before Jon Lewis - who had been taken to the cleaners earlier on - dug out Michael Clarke with an inside edge onto the stumps, taking the fifth wicket of the game at just the right time. Shane Watson accumulated well with Hussey, however, hitting six an over as Lewis was smashed about again, but Harmison got his revenge by completing his first five-wicket-haul in ODIs as Hussey was beaten by a slower ball - the first time Hussey had been dismissed in One-Day Internationals, for a batting average of 229. Then, Andrew Flintoff was brought back, getting a splendid yorker in for Watson, who was out for 25 just as the Aussies were preparing to hit out - the score 220 for 7 after 44.1 overs. Jason Gillespie and Brad Hogg survived a couple of overs from Flintoff and Harmison - meaning that Harmison finished with five for 33 off ten overs. Towards the end, Australia built up again, before losing Gillespie to a top edge, but 244 for 8 with seven balls remaining still looked difficult for England to chase. Gough dug out Michael Kasprowicz with a yorker with two balls to spare, and four legbyes ended the innings to take Australia to 252 for 9.

England started positively in reply, taking 39 off the first 34 legal deliveries (while Gillespie served up four wides and a no-ball in his first over), but Glenn McGrath took revenge by serving up a good yorker to have Marcus Trescothick bowled for 16. Two overs later, Andrew Strauss went in identical fashion, and Vaughan and Collingwood were forced to consolidate. They did, although in jerky fashion, Collingwood eventually falling to Kasprowicz and Flintoff mistiming a hit off Hogg to see England into a spot of bother at 119 for 4 after 27.2 overs, with Vaughan and Kevin Pietersen at the crease. Edges and runs followed, but when England lost Vaughan and Geraint Jones in quick succession, and were 93 short with only 74 deliveries left, it looked dark for England. Pietersen then upped the ante. Smashing runs to all corners, especially off Gillespie, he reached his fifty off 46 balls, and then took 19 more deliveries to bring up an additional 41 runs - although surviving an extremely close run-out decision near the 40th over. A level headed 7 not out from Lewis - making up somewhat for his bowling - ensured the English were home by three wickets and 15 deliveries - and the Australians had only managed two points from their first two matches, while England had gained 11.'

==== England v Bangladesh (21 June) ====
21 June
14:30 (D/N)
Scorecard

England; 391/4 (50 overs)	v	Bangladesh; 223 (45.2 overs)
AJ Strauss 152 (128); Nazmul Hossain 3/83 [10]		Mohammad Ashraful 94 (52); PD Collingwood 6/31 [10]

England won by 168 runs
Trent Bridge, Nottingham
Umpires: BF Bowden (NZ) and DR Shepherd (Eng)
Player of the match: PD Collingwood (Eng)

- England won the toss and elected to bat.
- Shahriar Nafees (Ban) and CT Tremlett (Eng) made their ODI debuts.
- Points: England 6, Bangladesh 0

Michael Vaughan chose to bat first on a good batting wicket at Trent Bridge, as England looked to set a massive target and keep up their good form. After a bit of a shaky start, with Andrew Strauss being dropped, but Marcus Trescothick smashed boundaries to all corners as Bangladesh's bowlers were made to look distinctly ordinary. Trescothick made a 51-ball fifty, before taking Tapash apart in the 15th over, as England cruised to 128 for 0 after 15 overs. A couple of overs later, Nazmul Hossain made the breakthrough, a massive smash ending in Shahriar Nafees' hands, as Trescothick hit an entertaining 85.

The new batsman Vaughan looked shaky at the crease, and eventually finished with an eight-ball duck, giving an inside edge to Nazmul's bowling. Andrew Flintoff was next to fall, giving a catch off Aftab Ahmed to skipper Habibul Bashar for 17, but good recuperation from Strauss and Paul Collingwood kept the run rate well over six, and Strauss could hit a 100-ball century with a single off Rafique in the fortieth over, and with the next ball Collingwood hit his fifty with a boundary. After ten over, England were 270 for 3, and Strauss and Collingwood decided to have some fun. The next nine overs went for 116 runs, Nazmul getting Strauss with the second last ball of the innings for 152 - England's second highest ODI score, and their highest since 1983. Paul Collingwood made 112 not out as well - only his second ODI century - to propel England to 391 for 4, the second highest ODI score of all time.

Chris Tremlett, England's ODI debutant, started well with good pace - near 140 km/h - while Jon Lewis served up full tosses and wides from the other end. In the tenth over, Tremlett got his due reward, first having Shahriar Nafees gone with an inside edge and then followed up with having Tushar Imran caught behind for a golden duck. Mohammad Ashraful was then given another life, misreading a ball from Tremlett which ended up on the stumps - incredibly, the bails stayed on, so Ashraful survived. The next 20 balls he faced were duly dispatched for runs - he particularly took a liking to Steve Harmison, who conceded more in 17 balls today than in the entire match against Australia - and he made the fastest ODI fifty by a Bangladeshi off just 21 balls. He looked to be on his way to the fifth-fastest ODI century, having hit 94 off 51 balls, but eventually hit one expansive stroke too many as he was bowled by Collingwood.

That calmed the nerves of the England team - after 26 overs, Bangladesh required ten an over for the last 24 overs with seven wickets in hand and Javed Omar and Habibul Bashar - both with a batting strike rate which equated to less than four an over - at the crease. The only question was whether the Bangladeshis could steal a bonus point from the English, which looked unlikely as Collingwood grabbed two quick wickets and reduced them to 180 for 5, and in the next over he removed Javed Omar as the Bangladeshi got an inside edge. Collingwood eventually finished with six for 31, taking Khaled Mashud and Mashrafe Mortaza as well, Mortaza bowled with the last ball of his 10-over-spell - to become the first person in ODI history to make a century and take a six-wicket-haul. Harmison, however, the hero of the last game, had to endure dropped catches off his bowling as he conceded 55 runs from eight overs, but he was not needed to bowl all ten as Tremlett removed Mohammad Rafique for 19, ending the Bangladeshi innings on 223 - 168 runs behind England. Overall, England could take some good batting form from their openers and a stunning debut from Tremlett - who looked much more impressive than Lewis in this game - out of the match, while Bangladesh could be happy with the swashbuckling Ashraful and Nazmul's three wickets.

==== England v Australia (23 June) ====
23 June (D/N)
Scorecard

Australia; 266/5 (50 overs)	v	England; 209/9 (50 overs)
A Symonds 73 (81); A Flintoff 2/55 [10]		D Gough 46* (47); GB Hogg 2/19 [6]

Australia won by 57 runs
Riverside Ground, Chester-le-Street
Umpires: Aleem Dar (Pak) and MR Benson (Eng)
Player of the match: A Symonds (Aus)

- England won the toss and elected to field.
- Points: Australia 6, England 0

Australia squared the ODI series by winning a game where England missed their captain Michael Vaughan due to injury. Marcus Trescothick, the stand-in captain, won the toss and decided to chase at the Riverside Ground, thus giving his own side the task of batting under floodlights. Chris Tremlett who had made an impressive debut against Bangladesh, struggled early on with his line and length, and the Australian openers Matthew Hayden and Adam Gilchrist punished him for runs. In his fifth over, however, Tremlett got a breakthrough, Gilchrist mistiming a cut and Geraint Jones taking the catch behind. However, Ricky Ponting didn't toss his wicket away early, leaving it to Hayden to hit the runs, and at the end of 15 overs the Australians were 73 for 1. Andrew Flintoff and Steve Harmison, the change bowlers, kept the pressure up on the batsmen, however, not letting too many runs away even though they bowled the occasional wide, and they could reap the rewards with two quick wickets, Ponting for 27 and Hayden for 39, and people began to remember the last ODI between the sides.

However, this time there was no collapse. Two no-balls from Harmison followed, Andrew Symonds and Damien Martyn defended well, waiting for Harmison and Flintoff to be taken off and saved for the last overs. They were - and Australia were let off the hook. Symonds and Martyn paired up for 142 runs, taking runs off every bowler - even Flintoff and Harmison - and batted together for nearly 25 overs, with a partnership run-rate of nearly 6. The first four overs only yielded 13 runs, but when Harmison was taken off England lost the sting. Symonds was finally run out by the skipper Trescothick for 73, a hopeless attempt at taking a single, and Flintoff dug out Michael Hussey for 5 two overs later. Australia, however, made a highly competitive 266 for 5, and in the seaming conditions one would expect it to be enough.

As it turned out, it was. Brett Lee, opening the bowling for Australia, started off with a maiden over to Trescothick, and England struggled to get off the mark, being four for no wicket after three overs. Another maiden from Glenn McGrath followed, and then Andrew Strauss departed with an inside edge off Lee. In the next over, Trescothick was gone for a 15-ball duck, to an away-swinger from McGrath, and two balls later Paul Collingwood gave a massive inside-edge onto his stumps - England were six for three, and staring down the barrel.

A rescue operation from Andrew Flintoff and Vikram Solanki followed, pairing up for 79 before Solanki was caught at midwicket off Brad Hogg. Then, Flintoff was nearly stumped off Hogg's bowling, only to give a catch at long on later on in the over for 44. With England at 94 for 5, they needed seven and a half runs an over, with Kevin Pietersen and Geraint Jones at the crease. However, even Pietersen couldn't save them this time, as he was caught in the deep off Symonds for 19, and the rest of the match just became a task to bat out 50 overs. Thanks to Darren Gough, who made 46 not out (ironically, the top score of the innings), and a level-headed 11 not out from Steve Harmison, England made that, but lost by 57 runs - thus also losing the bonus point.

==== Australia v Bangladesh (25 June) ====
25 June
Scorecard

Bangladesh; 139 (35.2 overs)	v	Australia; 140/0 (19 overs)
Mohammad Ashraful 58 (86); A Symonds 5/18 [7.2]		ML Hayden 66* (54)

Australia won by 10 wickets
Old Trafford, Manchester
Umpires: BF Bowden (NZ) and JW Lloyds (Eng)
Player of the match: A Symonds (Aus)

- Australia won the toss and elected to field.
- Points: Australia 6, Bangladesh 0

Australia recorded a thumping 10-wicket win over Bangladesh to level their head-to-head record in the NatWest Series to 1–1. Under leaden skies at Old Trafford, Ricky Ponting made the wise decision and chose to bowl, and short-balls from Brett Lee immediately had the Bangladeshis worried. They survived six overs without loss before Javed Omar was trapped by an in-swinger for a 20-ball 3. Tushar Imran was next to fall to Lee, and many expected a procession to begin, but Shahriar Nafees and Mohammad Ashraful gave the crowd a treat with some special strokes. Ashraful had two top-edged sixes, as Lee was dispatched for 20 runs in the eleventh over. By the drinks break after 15 overs, Bangladesh were 76 for 2, having added 53 from the last 39 balls. Ponting, however, brought on the spinners Brad Hogg and Andrew Symonds, who both got a fair amount of turn out of the Old Trafford pitch, and Symonds had Shahriar bowled for 47 with a yorker that he played late to. The next ball, he got the out-of-form captain Habibul Bashar, and the wickets began to tumble quickly. Symonds got five wickets for 18 runs, Hogg three for 29, Bangladesh collapsed from 137 for 6 (when Khaled Mashud was bowled by Hogg) to 139 all out in three overs, as Ashraful went for 58 and no one else really offering any resistance to the slow Australian bowlers.

Bangladesh had Adam Gilchrist in some trouble early on, especially through fast bowler Mashrafe Mortaza, who had him beaten several times in the opening overs, but Matthew Hayden was imposing at the crease, punishing the inevitable bad balls from Nazmul Hossain who was taken off after three overs, having conceded 29 runs. However, no one could stop the rot, Hayden and Gilchrist taking runs at will after a while to see Australia to the target inside 20 overs. Australia thus closed the gap to England to three points, as the situation indicated by the ICC rankings before the series became more and more possible - that Bangladesh were to be whipping boys and England and Australia would go through.

==== England v Bangladesh (26 June) ====
26 June
Scorecard

Bangladesh; 208/7 (50 overs)	v	England; 209/5 (38.5 overs)
Javed Omar 81 (150); A Flintoff 4/29 [9]		AJ Strauss 98 (104); Manjural Islam Rana 3/57 [9.5]

England won by 5 wickets
Headingley, Leeds
Umpires: Aleem Dar (Pak) and MR Benson (Eng)
Player of the match: AJ Strauss (Eng)

- Bangladesh won the toss and elected to bat.
- Points: England 6, Bangladesh 0

A lacklustre effort from England's opening bowlers was still enough to beat Bangladesh and cement a final between England and Australia in the NatWest Series. Habibul Bashar won the toss and batted first, and it looked to pay off as Shahriar Nafees, Javed Omar and Tushar Imran milked runs off the English opening bowlers. Especially Simon Jones - returning from injury - was erratic, bowling eight wides in the match, while Darren Gough was just smashed around the park. However, Jones got the early wicket when Nafees cut it to Marcus Trescothick at slip - before Bangladesh rebuilt again. After 16 overs, they were 82 for 1, and looked to build a sizable target.

However, their opener Javed - whose ODI strike rate was just above 50 at the time - slowed things down, and a double blow from Andrew Flintoff - first getting Tushar with an inside edge to have him bowled, and then Mohammad Ashraful for a golden duck - Bodyline-style. That set the Bangladeshis back, and patient bowling from Ashley Giles and Paul Collingwood resulted in the run-out of captain Habibul for 10. With Aftab Ahmed falling for 15, it was up to wicketkeeper Khaled Mashud who did an excellent job in lifting Bangladesh past 200 - taking a particular liking to Gough as he made 42 not out off 43 balls. Flintoff got two more wickets in the innings, finishing with four for 29, as he had Javed bowled for 81 and Mashrafe bowled for 1.

England got off to a very good start, with Trescothick and Andrew Strauss continuing in the vein of previous matches against the Bangladeshis, and pairing up for 99 runs for the first wicket. Trescothick was eventually out for 43 to Mohammad Rafique, giving a catch behind, but despite the spinners taking wickets, they were also expensive, Strauss in particular taking them for runs as he was bowled on 98 - attempting a sweep to bring up the win, the bonus point and his own century. Instead, the win was brought up very anticlimactically, Geraint Jones facing three balls before Manjural Islam Rana served up a wide. A disappointment for England would be that Flintoff still struggled with his batting form, only making 22, though in the match it mattered little - England still took the bonus point and qualified for the final, making the last two games redundant for them.

==== England v Australia (28 June) ====
28 June (D/N)
Scorecard

Australia; 261/9 (50 overs)	v	England; 37/1 (6 overs)
A Symonds 74 (75); D Gough 3/70 [9]		AJ Strauss 25 (18); GD McGrath 1/24 [3]

No result
Edgbaston, Birmingham
Umpires: BF Bowden (NZ) and DR Shepherd (Eng)

- Australia won the toss and elected to bat.
- Rain after 3 overs of England's innings left them with a target of 200 runs off 33 overs.
- Points: England 3, Australia 3

The eighth match of the NatWest Series eventually became an anti-climax, but for large parts of the match it wasn't - despite the fact that both teams had qualified for the final before the last game. Ricky Ponting won the toss and chose to send his openers in - and they took advantage. Darren Gough was innocuous, conceding 23 runs in his first two overs, prompting a bowling change in the fifth over, sending Steve Harmison on. Meanwhile, Simon Jones got some swing with the new ball - and, yet again in this series, Adam Gilchrist was caught behind off a swing bowler, out for 19. Shortly afterwards, Jones tried to throw the ball back at the wicketkeeper as Matthew Hayden pushed it back to him, but Jones hit Hayden with the balls, and a few words were exchanged - Paul Collingwood joining in the fray as well.

However, the match got on, Jones and Harmison putting on the pressure and eventually having Hayden lbw on 14 - after he had failed to score from the last eleven deliveries. Damien Martyn then faced five dot-balls, and Jones served up a wicket maiden, and Australia were at 46 for 2 at the end of the tenth over. However, that was as good as it got for England. Andrew Flintoff dug out skipper Ricky Ponting for 34, but it mattered little, as Martyn and Andrew Symonds took advantage of the bowling. Michael Vaughan tried to put himself on, but Symonds smashed him over midwicket for six - the first of the match, displaying the despair. With some no-balls from Gough, and Simon Jones getting smashed early on, Australia were 220 for 4 after 42 overs, and looked on course for 300. However, the run-out of Symonds for 74 changed the course of the innings. Michael Clarke departed for three, a good catch by Geraint Jones behind the stumps, and Harmison then served up a wicket-maiden in the 46th over, of all things. With Brad Hogg and Jason Gillespie giving soft catches to Gough, that redeemed his figures somewhat, but he still conceded 70 runs. The last over from Flintoff was very good, however, conceding only three runs with yorkers directed at the feet of the batsmen, and Australia had to be content with 261 for 9.

England's chase was interrupted once by rain, after three overs, when they were eight for 0, but coming back they were set 200 to win in 33 overs. That was never possible - rain started again after three more overs - and when Andrew Strauss fell the umpires decided that play was no longer possible, and a no-result was declared.

==== Australia v Bangladesh (30 June) ====
30 June
Scorecard

Bangladesh; 250/8 (50 overs)	v	Australia; 254/4 (48.1 overs)
Shahriar Nafees 75 (116); SR Watson 3/43 [10]		MJ Clarke 80* (104); Mashrafe Mortaza 2/44 [9]

Australia won by 6 wickets
St Lawrence Ground, Canterbury
Umpires: Aleem Dar (Pak) and JW Lloyds (Eng)
Player of the match: Shahriar Nafees (Ban)

- Australia won the toss and elected to field.
- Points: Australia 5, Bangladesh 1

The last game of the round robin of the NatWest Series was, as expected, won by the Australians. However, it summed up the improvement Bangladesh had made over the tour of England. In the first international, they were rolled over meekly by a no-balling, rusty English side - twice. In the last, Brett Lee and Jason Gillespie put the pressure on early, and with the aid of Shane Watson had them on the reels with 75 for 5. Yet, Bangladesh recovered to post 250 for 8, and were theoretically in with a chance for most of the game. Yet, they started very, very shakily. Javed Omar was dropped by Matthew Hayden in the third over, only to be out to Jason Gillespie in the next for an eight-ball duck - a disappointing end to a fine series for the Bangladeshi. Brett Lee had both Tushar Imran and Mohammad Ashraful beaten with full deliveries, Bangladesh were 19 for three wickets down - an all too familiar position.

A quickfire 30 from captain Habibul Bashar helped to take away some of the jitters, as Bashar took 16 runs off a Brett Lee over, but a bouncer from Shane Watson wasn't successfully evaded, and Adam Gilchrist could take the catch. Aftab Ahmed had to settle for 7, and it was down to the last two recognised batsmen - Shahriar Nafees, who had quietly moved his way to 25 not out, and wicketkeeper Khaled Mashud. However, the two put on a nigh-on faultless partnership of 94, taking their time to consolidate. Shahriar eventually departed for 75, edging a short ball from Shane Watson to the wicket-keeper - the usual method of dismissal. However, their partnership had given Bangladesh hope, and Mohammad Rafique took advantage with a six off Watson. Despite two more wickets falling - Rafique and Khaled Mahmud (caught at mid-on on the last ball) - Bangladesh had recovered to 250 for 8, which could potentially be tricky to chase.

Mashrafe Mortaza was hit around for twelve in the first over, however, and the momentum swung towards Australia. Mortaza hit back by inducing an outside edge from Matthew Hayden to wicketkeeper Mashud for 1, and four balls later a ball from Mortaza hit captain Ricky Ponting on the pads - but too high to be given out. Gilchrist and Ponting paired up well, however, even though Gilchrist rode his luck with a few drives in the air, but in the 10th over he gave a somewhat dubious catch to slip Khaled Mahmud, and was gone for 45 - all while rain threatened to damage the match. However, the weather gradually improved, along with Australia's chances - after 15 overs, they were 83 for three, having lost Damien Martyn for 9, but only needed slightly less than five an over. However, economical bowling and riskless batting from Australia saw Bangladesh in with a chance again. Ponting and Michael Clarke let the run rate go to more than six an over, but Khaled Mahmud's bowling at the death to Andrew Symonds left a bit to be desired, as Australia could take the necessary runs and win by eleven balls and six wickets to spare. A Bangladeshi – Shahriar Nafees – got the Man of the Match award, possibly for his effort to keep the match exciting after Bangladesh had crumbled to 75 for 5.

=== Final points table ===
Tri-Series Standings
Team	M	W	L	NR	Pts	NRR
England	6	4	1	1	26	+1.38
Australia	6	3	2	1	22	+0.89
Bangladesh	6	1	5	0	6	-2.01

=== Final ===
==== England v Australia (2 July) ====
2 July
Scorecard

Australia; 196 (48.5 overs)	v	England; 196/9 (50 overs)
MEK Hussey 62* (81); A Flintoff 3/23 [8]		GO Jones 71 (100); GD McGrath 3/25 [10]

Match tied
Lord's, London
Umpires: BF Bowden (NZ) and DR Shepherd (Eng)
Player of the match: GO Jones (Eng)

- England won the toss and elected to field.

The final of the NatWest Series ended in an anticlimax for the visitors, but throughout it gave entertainment to the crowd - despite being a relatively low-scoring game. It didn't look to be low-scoring early on, though, as Adam Gilchrist and Matthew Hayden punished the England opening bowlers Darren Gough and Simon Jones to be 50 for 0 after 6.3 overs. Two balls later, Hayden went for one expansive stroke too many - driving to Ashley Giles at mid-off for 17. England captain Michael Vaughan brought his change bowlers on, first Andrew Flintoff for Jones (who had been taken for 29 runs in his first three overs) and then the big man from Ashington, Steve Harmison.

Those changes turned the match on its head. Instead of the Australian batsmen taking easy runs off the English bowlers, the English bowlers now tied down the batting, getting rewards in the form of wickets. Gilchrist gave a catch to Kevin Pietersen at short leg for 27, and when Harmison was brought on a couple of overs later, he immediately got a wicket - of Ricky Ponting for 7, and Australia were 71 for 3 after 12.1 overs. Damien Martyn and Andrew Symonds decided to retreat into their shell, as the English bowling turned from difficult to nigh-on unhittable, Flintoff getting a touch on the off-stump of Symonds, but the bail didn't fall off, so he survived. However, the pair could only add 19 from 35 deliveries, before Harmison had Martyn caught behind with a ball that moved away from the batsman, off the waiting edge and into Geraint Jones' gloves.

Following the dismissal of Martyn, Vaughan brought back Jones - realising that Australia were reluctant to hit runs and thus allowing Jones to get through his overs without causing as much damage as he did early on. In fact, he and Harmison were part of a remarkable streak - they served up 28 successive dot-balls to Symonds and Michael Clarke (who bowed under to the pressure and was hit on the pad, out lbw for a 19-ball two). However, Michael Hussey - facing his first ball at 93 for 5 after 25 overs - took control of Jones, and when Harmison was taken off, Australia were let off the hook.

Symonds and Hussey batted out 15 overs, but Symonds struggled to hit runs and eventually smashed a drive to Andrew Strauss, who took a grateful catch, thus ending Symonds' innings for 29 - off 71 balls, a good innings in Test cricket but in ODI cricket virtually useless. Michael Vaughan then used a strange bowling change, keeping spinner Ashley Giles on for an over more than required and thus borrowing one from Andrew Flintoff who wasn't allowed to bowl a full ten. In the event, it mattered little. Flintoff had ample time to rip out Brett Lee and Jason Gillespie, and, with Harmison taking care of Brad Hogg and Glenn McGrath committing batting suicide with a shot not exactly out of the textbook, Australia were all out for 196 - and England were comfortably in the drivers' seat.

That was before they got in to bat, however. England survived the first three overs, bowled by McGrath and Lee, without loss. From then on, however, the English lost wickets by the bucketful. England went from 11 for 0 to 19 for 4 in the space of four overs, as the bowlers put the pressure on immediately, and their entire top-order came and went for single-figure scores. Paul Collingwood and Andrew Flintoff survived for a couple more overs, before Flintoff edged McGrath to slip - the score 33 for 5, and England should see themselves lucky to bat out 50 overs - or even score 100 runs. Collingwood and Geraint Jones decided to wait, giving McGrath maiden overs (as he finished his first bowling spell with figures of 7-4-9-3), and despite the batsmen being rapped on the pads, they survived, even taking the occasional six off Jason Gillespie.

After 25 overs, England were 65 for 5, but the Australian spinners didn't get too much out of the track. Dot-balls flourished, but the partnership kept in there, and a second six - from Jones off Hogg - showed their intent. After thirty-five overs, England were 113 for 5, and required a run a ball, with four overs of Lee and three of McGrath still to negotiate. However, England kept pushing, never letting the run-rate get above 7. Skipper Ponting showed some desperation when he brought Michael Hussey on with nine overs to spare, knowing that the spinners couldn't keep it tight, but got his reward in Hussey's second over when Collingwood was run out for 53 - off 116 balls.

Then Geraint Jones smacked two fours off Hussey to end the over, meaning that England needed 39 off 36 balls. Five balls later, a miscued sweep off Hogg hit Geraint Jones on the pads - gone for 71 - and England only had three wickets to spare. Two more balls were delivered before that tally was cut down to two - Hussey bowled Simon Jones for a two-ball one, so with Gough and Giles in, England needed 35 off 29 balls. Despite taking the runs off Hussey, Brett Lee's 47th over only yielded a single, as his variations of length turned out to be just the thing. However, Ponting now needed another over from either Hussey, Hogg or Symonds - deciding to use Hussey, he was punished, as Giles hit twos to both the off and leg side, and a wide from Hussey resulting in a nine-run over. Lee then came back on, and with his short ball had Giles playing a definitely unorthodox stroke - a sliced edge over Gilchrist's head for four.

Singles were taken to end the over, but McGrath was to bowl the last over of the game, with England still needing ten to win. Things got easier for England when McGrath overstepped with the first ball of the over, Gough making contact and running the single to cut the target by two - the no-ball for overstepping and the run single - and the no-ball meant McGrath still had to bowl six balls in the over. Giles then played and missed, before hitting a single, and then Gough drove the two next balls to cover for two. Suddenly, England only needed three off two - and were, incredibly, in a winning position again. But Gough's next shot was right back to McGrath, who took it up well and tossed it at the stumps, running out Gough and meaning that McGrath would bowl to Ashley Giles - and England still required three to win. The ball hit Giles' pads, ran away down the off side, and Giles and Harmison ran all they could to scamper two leg-byes - and tie the game.

== NatWest Challenge ==
=== England v Australia (7 July) ===
7 July
Scorecard

Australia; 219/7 (50 overs)	v	England; 221/1 (46 overs)
MEK Hussey 46 (52); PD Collingwood 4/34 [10]		ME Trescothick 104* (134); GB Hogg 1/30 [6]

England won by 9 wickets
Headingley, Leeds
Umpires: MR Benson (Eng) and RE Koertzen (SA)
Player of the match: ME Trescothick (Eng)

- England won the toss and elected to field.

England were lucky to win the toss and get a chance to bowl under cloudy skies at Headingley, as they beat Australia by nine wickets to take their second victory in five ODIs so far. Putting Australia in to bat, they didn't get immediate reward - as especially Darren Gough was smashed about by Adam Gilchrist, but the run rate at least stayed around four an over. And with Steve Harmison and Andrew Flintoff removing the openers in successive overs, things looked brighter for the English. Ricky Ponting and Damien Martyn added 39 for the next wicket, but in 11 overs, all while the English captain Michael Vaughan set attacking fields according to the new power play rules.

England all-rounder Paul Collingwood came on as third-change bowler, and used the helpful conditions to incite Ponting's demise, as Kevin Pietersen held a catch to dismiss the Australian captain for 14, and Collingwood continued to end with four wickets for 34 runs, as Australia slumped from 107 for 2 to 159 for 6 - all wickets courtesy of Collingwood. However, Michael Hussey showed his skills from number seven yet again, as he made a 52-ball 46 - while the ball was still moving around due to the cloud cover - and lifted Australia to 219 for 7.

The English reply was initially jittery. The pace of Brett Lee and accuracy of Glenn McGrath shook the English opening batsmen Marcus Trescothick and Andrew Strauss. Trescothick, for example, was caught off a no-ball from Lee, but survived, as the openers lasted nearly 25 overs - before Strauss was caught behind off Brad Hogg for 41. By that time, however, the sun had come out, the ball didn't swing much in the air, and as Lee kept on bowling no-balls - seven in total - things simply wouldn't work out for Australia. Trescothick used 132 balls to bring up his century, skipper Michael Vaughan made a healthy contribution with 59 not out, and England brought up the winning total with four overs to spare.

=== England v Australia (10 July) ===
10 July
Scorecard

England; 223/8 (50 overs)	v	Australia; 224/3 (44.2 overs)
A Flintoff 87 (112); B Lee 5/41 [10]		RT Ponting 111 (115); AF Giles 1/38 [10]

Australia won by 7 wickets
Lord's, London
Umpires: RE Koertzen (SA) and JW Lloyds (Eng)
Player of the match: B Lee (Aus)

- Australia won the toss and elected to field.

Australian captain Ricky Ponting had a high score of 34 and a batting average of 16.40 over five innings in the series. At Lord's, he scored runs as Australia won the match, leveling the NatWest Challenge.

It started well for Australia, too. Including Michael Kasprowicz in the squad and gambling on winning the toss and subbing one of their bowlers off, they won it - and Kasprowicz got immediate reward. After the English openers had survived the opening overs of McGrath and Lee to be 25 for 0 after eight overs, Kasprowicz was brought on, and Strauss chopped an inside edge onto his own stumps. Nine balls and three runs later, captain Michael Vaughan was hit on the pads by an inswinging delivery from Glenn McGrath and was out for 1. Marcus Trescothick and Kevin Pietersen soon followed to the pavilion, and England were - yet again - staring down the barrel at 45 for 4.

However, England weren't undone that easily. Waiting for Jason Gillespie, who had been conceding many runs all series, Andrew Flintoff and Paul Collingwood paired up for a calm 103 in a little over 20 overs, before Collingwood became Brett Lee's second victim of the day, luring Collingwood to attempt a cut shot off a fast, short ball and edging to keeper Adam Gilchrist. England's resistance didn't end, however, and despite Lee ripping out wickets - ending with five for 41 - the lower-order combined, eking out 30 from the last 21 balls to lift England to a somewhat defensible total of 223 for 8.

And, when Andrew Flintoff was brought on as the fourth bowler to be used in six overs, and removed Gilchrist with his second ball of the day, things looked hopeful for England, but that was as good as it ever got. Ricky Ponting smashed 14 fours and a six on his way to 111, making a century off 105 balls, Michael Vaughan was forced to wait with the power play overs, Simon Katich, Damien Martyn and Andrew Symonds played well-paced innings, and England found themselves unable to contain the Australians. The end was always in sight, eventually coming with 34 balls remaining, Darren Gough bowling a no-ball - his third of the day - to gift the game to Australia. It was symptomatic of Gough's poor series, and indeed, he had Gilchrist bowled off a no-ball in the very first over. His bowling analysis for the game read 6.2-0-43-1.

=== England v Australia (12 July) ===
12 July
Scorecard

England; 228/7 (50 overs)	v	Australia; 229/2 (34.5 overs)
KP Pietersen 74 (84); JN Gillespie 3/44 [10]		AC Gilchrist 121* (101); D Gough 1/37 [4]

Australia won by 8 wickets
The Oval, London
Umpires: RE Koertzen (SA) and DR Shepherd (Eng)
Player of the match: AC Gilchrist (Aus)

- Australia won the toss and elected to field.

This match was eerily similar to the one two days earlier - except that Jason Gillespie actually got rewards with the ball, and the batsman to play himself into form was Adam Gilchrist - however, both England and Australia picked batsmen as their supersubs, just like on the 10th of July. Australia won the toss, chose to field to gain an extra batsman, and had England on the rack.

The game was won in the first few overs. The pitch, as Surrey and Hampshire showed in a game played three days later, had a par score well in excess of 300. However, Glenn McGrath's first four overs were maidens, and his fifth over only failed to be because Jason Gillespie dropped a skier, much to the amusement of the crowd. With Brett Lee bowling well and picking up the early wicket of Marcus Trescothick for a duck, England were well behind on the run rate from the start.

They never recovered. Despite another skier being dropped, this time by Adam Gilchrist, and the crowd enjoying Gillespie dropping more catches whilst practising in the field, Australia's dominance and fine fielding on the ground saw more England wickets fall. In 27.5 overs, they only mustered 93 runs - for the loss of six wickets, with Michael Vaughan, Andrew Strauss, Andrew Flintoff, Paul Collingwood and Geraint Jones all out. A desperate situation meant England had to use their substitute, putting on Vikram Solanki for bowler Simon Jones - and Solanki helped save England to some respectability, along with Kevin Pietersen. Solanki made an unbeaten 53 and Pietersen 74 as England posted 228 for 7.

On a flat, unresponsive pitch, England's bowlers (now without the subbed-off Jones) were helpless. Gilchrist smashed an 81-ball ton, with an array of shots all around the ground, and eventually ended on 121 not out. Three of the English bowlers conceded more than six an over - Steve Harmison, with 81 runs off 9.5 overs, Darren Gough, with 37 off four, and Ashley Giles with 64 off ten. The two wickets the English got - Matthew Hayden caught behind for 31 and Ricky Ponting stumped for 44 - were largely pointless.

In all, it was a comprehensive victory for Australia, probably one of their easiest on the entire tour - possibly excluding the 19-over demolition of Bangladesh in game six of the group stage, with the biggest excitement being when the officials and players were presented to His Royal Highness the Duke of Edinburgh in the break. The Duke was at the ground to officially open the new OCS stand at the Oval. He took the opportunity to lead the tributes to umpire David Shepherd, on his retirement from international umpiring. Former British prime minister Sir John Major and current Australian prime minister John Howard also sent tributes to Shepherd.
