= Terrorism in Bangladesh =

- The bomb blasts carried out by Jamaat-ul-Mujahideen Bangladesh on 17 August 2005.
| Date | First phase: 1 February 1972 – 24 November 1975 (3 years); Second phase: 1977 – 2 December 1997 (20 years); Third phase: 18 January 1999 – present (27 years, 10 months and 2 days) |
| Location | Bangladesh (spillover into Myanmar and India) |
| Status | Ongoing |

Belligerents
| First phase: Bangladesh | Marxist insurgents: Jatiya Samajtantrik Dal; JGB; Biplobi Shainik Sangstha | Maoist insurgents: Proletarian Party of East Bengal; PBJMF | |
| Second phase: Bangladesh | Tribal insurgents: Parbatya Chattagram Jana Samhati Samiti; Shanti Bahini | Maoist insurgents: Gono Mukti Fouz; Purbo Banglar Communist Party; Biplobi Communist Party; Proletarian Party of East Bengal | Islamist insurgents: Jamaat-ul-Mujahideen Bangladesh; Jagrata Muslim Janata Bangladesh |
| Third phase: Bangladesh | Islamist terror groups: AQIS (since 2014) Harkat-ul-Jihad al-Islami Jamaat-ul-Mujahideen Bangladesh (since 2004) Allah'r Dal (since 2004) Shahadat-e al Hiqma (2003–2011, since 2014) Ansarullah Bangla Team (since 2013) Pakistani Taliban; Maoist insurgents: Gono Mukti Fouz Purbo Banglar Communist Party Biplobi Communist Party Proletarian Party of East Bengal Maoist Bolshevik Reorganisation Movement of the Purba Banglar Sarbahara Party | Islamic State; IS–BP (since 2015); Neo-Jamaat-ul-Mujahideen Bangladesh (splinter group) | Arakan Rohingya Salvation Army; Kuki-Chin National Front; United People's Democratic Front; United People's Democratic Front Parbatya Chattagram Jana Samhati Samiti (MN Larma); Parbatya Chattagram Jana Samhati Samiti |

Commanders and leaders
| Mirza Fakhrul Islam Alamgir; Tarique Rahman; (Bangladesh) Salahuddin Ahmed; Mir Mushfiqur Rahman; Waker-uz-Zaman; Mohammad Nazmul Hassan; Hasan Mahmood Khan; Mohammad Ashrafuzzaman Siddiqui; Md. Ali Hossain Fakir; Former: Shahabuddin Ahmed; A. Q. M. Badruddoza Chowdhury; Muhammad Jamiruddin Sircar; Iajuddin Ahmed; Zillur Rahman; Mohammad Abdul Hamid; Mohammed Shahabuddin; Latifur Rahman; Khaleda Zia; Fazlul Haque; Fakhruddin Ahmed; Sheikh Hasina (surrendered); Muhammad Yunus; (Bangladesh) Mohammed Nasim; (Bangladesh) Altaf Hossain Chowdhury; (Bangladesh) Lutfozzaman Babar; (Bangladesh) M. A. Matin; (Bangladesh) Sahara Khatun; (Bangladesh) Muhiuddin Khan Alamgir; (Bangladesh) Asaduzzaman Khan (surrendered); (Bangladesh) M. Sakhawat Hussain; (Bangladesh) Jahangir Alam Chowdhury; Mohammad Shubid Ali Bhuiyan; A. I. M. Mostofa Reza Nur; Jahangir Alam Chowdhury; Masud Uddin Chowdhury; Md Abdul Mubeen; Abdul Wadud; Belal Shafiul Huq; Md Mainul Islam; Md Mahfuzur Rahman; Waker-uz-Zaman; Mizanur Rahman Shamim; SM Kamrul Hassan; Mustafizur Rahman; M Harun-Ar-Rashid; Hasan Mashhud Chowdhury; Moeen U Ahmed; Md Abdul Mubeen; Iqbal Karim Bhuiyan; Belal Shafiul Huq; Aziz Ahmed; SM Shafiuddin Ahmed; Abu Taher; Shah Iqbal Mujtaba; M. Hasan Ali Khan; Sarwar Jahan Nizam; Zahir Uddin Ahmed; M. Farid Habib; Mohammad Nizamuddin Ahmed; Aurangzeb Chowdhury; M Shaheen Iqbal; Jamal Uddin Ahmed; Mohammad Rafiqul Islam; Fakhrul Azam; Shah Mohammad Ziaur Rahman; Enamul Bari; Abu Esrar; Masihuzzaman Serniabat; Shaikh Abdul Hannan; Mohammad Azizur Rahman; A. L. M. Fazlur Rahman; Mohammad Abu Ishaque Ibrahim; Rezzakul Haider Chowdhury; Jahangir Alam Chowdhury; Shakil Ahmed †; Md Mainul Islam; Md Rafiqul Islam; Anwar Hussain; Aziz Ahmed; Abul Hossain; Md Shafeenul Islam; Shakil Ahmed; A K M Nazmul Hasan; A. Y. B. I. Siddiqi; Muhammad Nurul Huda; Mudabbir Hossain Chowdhury; Shahudul Haque; Ashraful Huda; Mohammad Hadis Uddin; Abdul Kaium; Anwarul Iqbal; Khoda Baksh Chowdhury; Nur Mohammad; Hassan Mahmood Khandker; A. K. M. Shahidul Haque; Mohammad Javed Patwary; Benazir Ahmed; Chowdhury Abdullah Al-Mamun; Md. Mainul Islam; Baharul Alam | Abdul Hannan (executed) Bangla Bhai (executed) Abdur Rahman (executed) Abdun Nur Sayed Kawsar Hossain Siddique (POW) Jakir Khandakar; Faziul Haq † Rashidul Islam Islam Sabuj † Amirul Islam † Abdur Rouf Sahinur Rahman † Saidul † | Abu Dujanah al-Bengali †; Abu Ibrahim al-Hanif (surrendered); Abu Muhammed al-Bengali? Abu Abbas al-Bengali; Sarwar Jahan Manik †; Abdullah al-Tasnim (surrendered) | Hafez Nur Mohammad (POW); Nathan Bom; Cheosim Bom (POW); Prasit Bikash Khisa Joan Chakma Jewel Chakma Shachal Chakma; Tapan Jyoti Chakma † Shaktiman Chakma †; Shantu Larma |

Units involved
| Bangladesh Armed Forces; Army; Navy; Air Force; DGFI; Police; RAB; APBn; BGB; BCG; Ansar–VDP | Unknown | Unknown | Unknown |

Casualties and losses
| 24,330+ Security Force members dead | 1,000+ dead or arrested | 1,000+ dead or arrested | 850+ ARSA insurgents arrested; 55+ KNF insurgents arrested; 15+ UPDF members dead and 4+ UPDF members arrested; 4+ UPDF-D members dead |
- Civilians: 50,724+ dead

Terrorism in Bangladesh is primarily composed of Islamist militant activities aimed at subverting the secular constitutional system to establish Sharia rule. These activities are often linked with international jihadist networks such as Al-Qaeda and ISIS. Major groups include Jama'at-ul-Mujahideen Bangladesh (JMB), responsible for coordinated bombings in 63 locations in 2005 which killed dozens and injured hundreds; its reformed splinter group, Neo-JMB; and Ansarullah Bangla Team (ABT), which targets secular bloggers and minorities.

Notable incidents include the 2016 Holey Artisan Bakery attack in Dhaka, where ISIS-affiliated militants killed 29 hostages, including foreign nationals, in a siege lasting over 12 hours. Alongside this are the serial killings of intellectuals and attacks on the Shia and Ahmadiyya communities.

Strict counter-measures by the government, such as operations by the Rapid Action Battalion (RAB), asset seizures, and the execution of JMB leaders through legal processes, led to a reduction in major attacks, and by 2023, no transnational incidents had occurred. But the ousting of Prime Minister Sheikh Hasina in August 2024 accelerated institutional chaos, creating a policing vacuum and leading to the release of convicted militants. This has fueled a documented increase in extremist activities by groups like Hizb ut-Tahrir, and the risk of an Islamist resurgence has grown as counter-terrorism solidarity has weakened.

== History ==
=== Pre-independence and liberation war-era ===
In the early twentieth century, Bengal (present-day Bangladesh and West Bengal) emerged as a center of revolutionary terrorism against British colonial rule, characterized by secret societies committing assassinations, bombings, and robberies to challenge imperial authority. Groups like the Anushilan Samiti and Jugantar, active from around 1905, drew inspiration from Hindu nationalist ideology and physical culture movements to target British officials and infrastructure in an attempt to instigate a mass uprising; these activities peaked during the Swadeshi movement following the 1905 Partition of Bengal. Notable incidents included the 1908 Muzaffarpur bombing, which killed two British women. Although East Bengal saw marginal involvement through networks extending revolutionary propaganda and arms smuggling, terrorism was more pronounced in West Bengal districts such as Kolkata and Dhaka, as the region's Muslim-majority population mitigated the Hindu-centric appeals. British countermeasures, including internment under the 1919 Rowlatt Act and the Bengal Criminal Law Amendment, suppressed these groups by the 1930s, shifting the main focus towards mainstream nationalism led by the Congress.

After the 1947 partition, East Pakistan (present-day Bangladesh) witnessed sporadic violence against Hindus amid the chaos of migration and property disputes, but organized terrorism remained dormant. Islamist groups like Jamaat-e-Islami, founded in 1941, prioritized pan-Islamic unity within Pakistan and opposed Bangladesh's independence, but they did not participate in any documented terrorist operations during that period.

Under Operation Searchlight, which began on 25 March 1971, state-sponsored acts of terror by Pakistani forces to crush Bangladesh's demand for independence led to planned attacks on Dhaka's universities, newspapers, and Awami League offices, resulting in the deaths of thousands of Bengali civilians within days. Pakistani military strategy included paramilitary auxiliary forces, primarily recruited from the Bihari community and Jamaat-e-Islami collaborators, known as Razakars. These forces engaged in raiding villages, carrying out targeted killings of intellectuals, and committing sexual violence, leading to an estimated 200,000 to 3 million civilian deaths and up to 400,000 cases of rape during these nine months.

The actions of the Jamaat-e-Islami leadership, who collected intelligence and formed units like Al-Badr to kill Bengalis and Hindus, were subsequently tried as war crimes in Bangladesh's tribunals.

=== Post-independence insurgencies (1970s-1980s) ===
Following Bangladesh's independence in 1971, leftist insurgent groups, including the Purba Banglar Sarbahara Party (PBSP) established by Siraj Sikder in June 1971, initiated armed opposition against the Sheikh Mujibur Rahman government. In their view, this government was aligned with Indian and Soviet interests instead of a genuine proletarian revolution. These Maoist groups, which had broken away from previous communist movements, conducted guerrilla operations targeting state forces and alleged class enemies. Discontent over post-independence economic policies and political centralization fueled these activities.

This insurgency intensified from 1972-1975, involving groups like the Gonobahini (People's Army), the armed wing of the Jatiya Samajtantrik Dal (Jasad), which had split from the radical leftist faction of the Awami League. They clashed with government forces amid rising tensions in late 1974. The killing of Siraj Sikder in January 1975 and subsequent military crackdowns under Ziaur Rahman caused these groups to fragment; although their militant capabilities diminished by the late 1970s, their remnants persisted with limited activities in rural areas.

From 1975 till 1977, Bangladeshi politician Abdul Kader Siddique organzed a low level insurgency against Bangladeshi military and security personnel from 1975 till 1977.After the assassination of Sheikh Mujibur Rahman in 1975, Siddiqui and his followers attacked government troops. Elements loyal to Siddiqui operated from bases in Assam province in India and were actively supported by India's Border Security Force. From September till October 1975 armed clashes with security personnel at different parts of the country left 72 insurgents dead. They also claimed to have occupied some 300 kilometres area along the border stretching from Rangpur to Sylhet with about 9500 insurgents. During these attacks, 104 rebels were killed and more than 500 were injured. The insurgency lasted more than two years. In 1976, the ndian Prime minister Morarji Desai and his Janata Party came to power and ended support for his insurgency by stating "no shelter shall be given to criminal elements across the border" and promised non-interference in Bangladeshi affairs. Siddique complained that Indian Prime minister Morarji Desai handed over 6000 of his fighters to the government of Ziaur Rahman.

Parallel to the leftist unrest, ethnic tensions in the Chittagong Hill Tracts (CHT) escalated into an insurgency in the mid-1970s. This stemmed from indigenous grievances over the loss of traditional autonomy, which was further exacerbated by the influx of Bengali settlers and development projects like the 1963 Kaptai Dam. The Kaptai Dam had displaced nearly 100,000 tribal people. The Parbatya Chattagram Jana Samhati Samiti (PCJSS), formed in 1972, established the Shanti Bahini as its armed wing and began guerrilla attacks on military outposts and settlers in 1977, amidst government assimilation policies under military rule.

The Shanti Bahini's tactics included ambushes, kidnappings, and bombings. According to government statistics, this resulted in an estimated 1,180 soldiers and civilians killed, 766 injured, and 582 abducted from 1980 onwards, while their fighter strength was around 2,500 in the early 1990s. The government deployed over 120,000 troops for counter-insurgency operations in the early 1980s, which included allegations of forcibly transferring nearly 400,000 Bengali settlers and human rights violations. This contributed to over 80,000 tribal refugees fleeing to India and a total estimated 30,000 deaths until the conflict's resolution in 1997.

== The rise of Islamist militant networks ==
=== Formation of central groups (1990s) ===
One of Bangladesh's oldest Islamist militant groups, Harkat-ul-Jihad al-Islami Bangladesh (HuJI-B), was formally established in April 1992 by a group of Mujahideen cadres returning from fighting in Afghanistan during the Soviet-Afghan War. The group's formation was accelerated by the arrival of nearly 3,000 Bangladeshi volunteers who had received military training from Arab instructors, including Osama bin Laden, and were indoctrinated in Salafi-jihadist ideology during the late 1980s and early 1990s. HuJI-B's declared objective was to overthrow the secular government through armed struggle and establish Sharia law. It developed operational relationships with groups such as Pakistan's Harkat-ul-Jihad al-Islami and the early networks of al-Qaeda. Its initial leadership included individuals like Shawkat Osman, who coordinated recruitment and training camps in Bangladesh's remote border areas.

By the mid-1990s, HuJI-B began assassinating secular intellectuals, and politicians considered 'apostates' and launched other small-scale operations, initiating madrasa-based recruitment linked to Deobandi institutions. Members of this group pledged allegiance to global jihadist fatwas. Notably, they signed bin Laden's 1998 declaration of war against the United States and its allies. Their funding came from donations, initially arriving via Pakistani intermediaries, and local extortion, which was used to purchase light arms smuggled from Afghanistan.

Towards the end of the decade, in April 1998, Jamaat-ul-Mujahideen Bangladesh (JMB) emerged in Palampur, Dhaka Division. It was led by Abdur Rahman, a former member of HuJI-B. JMB emphasized rapid militarization and targeted assassinations to accelerate the establishment of a caliphate. They broke away from the larger networks, prioritizing internal insurgency over immediate 'foreign conspiracies'. Its core cadre of initially 100-200 members focused on bomb-making skills acquired from Afghan-returnees, which set the stage for coordinated attacks in the early 2000s. Political instability under successive BNP and Awami League governments, porous borders, and unchecked madrasa radicalization enabled this transformation.

=== The influence of Afghan and global Jihad ===
During the Soviet-Afghan War (1979-1989), Bangladeshi volunteers were drawn to fight with Mujahid forces, gaining exposure to combat training, explosives expertise, and Salafi-jihadi ideology in camps supported by Saudi, Pakistani, and other patrons. Returning fighters leveraged this experience in domestic militant activities. This culminated in the formation of Harkat-ul-Jihad al-Islami Bangladesh (HuJI-B) in April 1992, led by a core group of these veterans to establish Islamic rule in Bangladesh. HuJI-B's initial operations reflected tactics honed in Afghanistan, such as conducting ambushes in small units and bomb-making.

Global jihadism, through Al-Qaeda's international network, further amplified these influences. Consequently, HuJI-B established operational relationships, including safe havens, funding, and joint training, in the Afghan-Pakistani border regions. HuJI-B leaders, including Mufti Abdur Rauf, endorsed Osama bin Laden's February 1998 fatwa calling for attacks on American and allied interests. Although this aligned Bangladeshi militants with the 'far enemy' doctrine, they continued to prioritize local secular targets. This nexus enabled HuJI-B to train hundreds of members in Bangladesh and send fighters abroad.

The establishment of Al-Qaeda in the Indian Subcontinent (AQIS) in September 2014 further expanded this connection. They involved Bangladeshi members in regional plots, such as attempting vessel hijackings and the targeted killings of bloggers who promoted secularism.

== Government counter-terrorism strategies ==
=== Initial responses during military and BNP regimes ===
During the military regimes of Ziaur Rahman (1975–1981) and Hussain Muhammad Ershad (1982–1990), large-scale organized Islamist terrorism had not manifested; thus, counter-terrorism efforts were primarily directed at leftist insurgents, criminal and separatist movements rather than emerging Islamist networks. To consolidate power following the assassination of Sheikh Mujibur Rahman, Ziaur Rahman adopted various Islamization policies to bolster political support, including removing secularism from the constitution in 1977, inserting Islamic phrases such as "Bismillah-ar-Rahman-ar-Rahim," and granting legitimacy to previously banned religion-based political parties that had collaborated with Pakistan during the 1971 Liberation War. These measures facilitated the return and integration of Bangladeshi Mujahideen who had fought against the Soviets in Afghanistan, leading to the formation of groups such as Harkat-ul-Jihad al-Islami Bangladesh (HuJI-B) in 1992. At that time, no specific bans or crackdown operations were conducted targeting these proto-Islamist elements.

Ershad continued this trend by declaring Islam the state religion through a constitutional amendment in 1988, thereby further embedding Islamist influence in governance and education. At that time, security forces prioritized suppressing threats from communist and regional autonomy movements, such as in the Chittagong Hill Tracts, over emerging jihadi ideology. In the absence of specific counter-terrorism legislation, responses relied on ordinary penal codes and military intelligence, and documented actions against Islamist precursors were minimal.

During the regimes of the Bangladesh Nationalist Party (BNP), particularly Khaleda Zia's 1991–1996 and 2001–2006 terms, Islamist terrorism further escalated due to their alliance with Islamist parties such as Jamaat-e-Islami. These parties were partners in the coalition government and provided electoral support.

As BNP officials provided tacit protection to militants in exchange for political loyalty, Jama'atul Mujahideen Bangladesh (JMB), formed around 1998–2000, expanded unchecked in the early 2000s, recruiting members through madrasas and carrying out low-level extortion and assassinations. This leniency led to the unchecked growth of networks responsible for grenade attacks on political targets, such as the 2004 attack on an Awami League rally; however, effective measures were taken only after the situation had deteriorated.

A strategic shift occurred following JMB's nationwide serial bombings on 17 August 2005, in which over 450 low-capacity explosive devices were detonated across 63 districts, leaving two dead and dozens injured. This compelled the BNP government to ban JMB and HuJI-B in October 2005 under existing emergency powers. Subsequent operations resulted in the arrest of leaders such as JMB chief Shaykh Abdur Rahman and Siddique ul-Islam (Bangla Bhai) in late 2005, with trials and executions carried out under the Caretaker administration of 2007–2008. But critics note that these measures were reactive and influenced by international pressure, rather than being part of a proactive strategy.

=== Awami League's crackdown (2009-2024) ===
Following its victory in the January 2009 elections, the Awami League government, led by Prime Minister Sheikh Hasina, enacted the Anti-Terrorism Act 2009 aimed at bolstering the legal framework against militant groups. This Act replaced prior ordinances and incorporated provisions for the seizure of assets related to terrorism financing, the admissibility of confessions as evidence, and various penalties, including capital punishment. The law was subsequently amended in 2012 and 2013 to dismantle networks such as Jamaat-ul-Mujahideen Bangladesh (JMB) and Harkat-ul-Jihad-al-Islami (HuJI), by expanding the definition of terrorism, expediting trials through special tribunals, and mandating the death penalty for financing militant activities.

During the Awami League's tenure, security forces, such as the Rapid Action Battalion (RAB), conducted extensive operations targeting JMB, Neo-JMB, and ISIS-affiliated organizations, resulting in thousands of arrests and the neutralization of numerous operational cells. Following the 2016 Holey Artisan Bakery attack in Dhaka, which left 29 dead and was claimed by ISIS, authorities launched 'Operation Thunderbolt'. This operation led to the arrest of over 3,000 suspects, including 37 confirmed militants, within mere days, and a further 8,500 individuals were detained in a subsequent combing operation in mid-June 2016. RAB and the Counter Terrorism and Transnational Crime (CTTC) unit dismantled bomb-making factories and financing channels. As part of these operations, which continued into the 2020s, JMB members were arrested from areas such as Rajshahi as late as April 2017.

Judicial proceedings included the execution of HuJI leader Mufti Abdul Kader Molla and his two associates on 12 April 2017, for the 2004 grenade attack on the British High Commissioner, and the sentencing of 14 JMB militants to death in March 2021 for the conspiracy to assassinate Sheikh Hasina in 2000. Although ISIS-inspired incidents increased between 2013 and 2016, intelligence-led operations and international cooperation weakened militant coordination, reducing the threat to a low level between 2017 and 2023.

Critics, including human rights organizations, have alleged that RAB committed extrajudicial killings, known as 'crossfire' deaths, during these operations. In December 2021, the United States imposed sanctions on this unit and seven of its former officials over allegations of human rights abuses related to counter-terrorism activities. But government data emphasizes that these measures specifically targeted identified militants.

== Timeline ==
=== First phase ===
==== 1973 ====
- On 1 January, Mohammad Abdul Jalil formed the Biplobi Shainik Sangstha.
- In April, Siraj Sikder, the founder of the Maoist group, Purba Banglar Sarbahara Party, formed the Purba Banglar Jatiya Mukti Front and declared war against the Bangladeshi government.

==== 1975 ====
- On 2 January, Siraj Sikder was shot and killed by police in Savar Upazila, Dhaka.
- On 3 November, Khondaker Mostaq Ahmad, Mujib's usurper, (Note: In Bangladesh Italian Marble Works Ltd. v. Government of Bangladesh, the Supreme Court ruled that Mostaq's accession to the Presidency was illegal as it violated the line of succession and occurred after a military coup. Therefore, it was declared that Mostaq was a usurper and all Ordinances rendered by him under martial law were null and void of any legal effect.) was ousted by Maj. Gen. Khaled Mosharraf and three other high-ranking officers in a bloodless counter-coup.
- On 7 November, Maj. Gen. Khaled Mosharraf, Col. Abu Taher Mohammad Haider, and Col. Khondkar Nazmul Huda were killed in another counter-coup led by the JSD-backed Biplobi Shainik Sangstha.
- On 24 November, JSD leader Abu Taher was arrested under the order of Ziaur Rahman. Abu Taher was executed on 21 July 1976, ending the first phase of the conflict.

=== Second phase ===
==== 1984 ====
- On 31 May, a group of 125 Shanti Bahini insurgents massacred about 400 Bengalis in Bhushanchhara Union of Barkal Upazila, Rangamati.

==== 1986 ====
- On 29 April, Shanti Bahini insurgents massacred 19 Bengali residents in Tanakkapara Union of Panchhari Upazila, Khagrachhari.

=== Third phase ===
==== 1999 ====
- On 18 January 1999, Harkat-ul Jihad al-Islami Bangladesh carried out an assassination attempt on Shamsur Rahman.
- On 6 March bomb attack on Bangladesh Udichi Shilpigoshthi in Jessore killed 10.
- On 15 March bomb attack on the home of Mohibur Rahman Manik, Awami League member of parliament, killed two.
- On 8 December 1999, an Ahmadi mosque was bombed, killing eight.

==== 2001 ====
- On 20 January, a rally by the Communist Party of Bangladesh was bombed, killing five people and wounding 70 others.
- On 14 April, 10 people were killed in a series of bombings perpetrated by Harkat-ul-Jihad al-Islami.
- On 1 June, 10 people were killed in the Gopalganj Roman Catholic church bombing.
- On 16 June, a rally of the Awami League was bombed in Narayanganj.
- On 23 September, a rally of the Awami League in Bagerhat was bombed.
- On 26 September, a rally of the Awami League was bombed in Sunamganj, killing four.
- On 16 November, the death of Gopal Krishna Muhuri took place in Chittagong.

==== 2002 ====
- On 6 December, 27 people were killed in the coordinated bombing of cinema halls in Mymensingh.
- On 28 September, three people were killed and 100 injured in the bombing of a cinema hall and circus in Satkhira.

==== 2003 ====
- On 17 January, a bomb blast occurred at a shrine fair in Tangail.
- 22 January, five people were killed in a Sufi shrine, including its caretaker.
- On 8 February, Sayed Kawsar Hossain Siddique founded an Islamist organisation named Shahadat-e al Hiqma.
- On 1 March, a police sergeant was killed in a bomb attack in Khulna.
- On 11 March, two police constables were killed in a bomb attack.
- On 12 March, a police officer was killed in a bomb attack in Khulna.
- On 6 September, an Awami League leader was killed in a bomb attack.

==== 2004 ====
- On 12 January, a bombing in Shah Jalal Dargah killed 12.
- On 13 January, a bomb attack on Fazlur Rahman, joint secretary of Sharsha Upazila unit of the Awami League in Benapol, killed him and injured six.
- On 13 January, three people were killed in a bomb attack on Shah Jalal Dargah.
- On 13 January, a bomb was thrown at a traffic sergeant, which failed to explode in Moilapota intersection, Khulna.
- On 15 January, Manik Chandra Saha, a journalist, was killed in a terror attack.
- On 24 January, a police camp was bombed in Bagerhat, injuring three police officers.
- On 20 February, a movie house at Rupsa Upazila was bombed, injuring four.
- On 4 March, an Awami League leader was killed in a bomb attack in Bagerhat. Another Awami League leader was assassinated in Narayanganj.
- On 4 August, a bomb attack on Rangmahal Cinema and at Monika Cinema in Sylhet killed one and injured ten.
- On 21 August, HuJI militants perpetrated a grenade attack on an Awami League rally in Dhaka, killing 24 people and injuring over 300.
- On 24 December, Rajshahi University Professor Mohammad Yunus was killed in an attack by JMB.

==== 2005 ====
- On 17 August, a total of 500 bombs exploded in 300 locations across Bangladesh, killing two people and injuring 50. Jama'atul Mujahideen Bangladesh later claimed responsibility for the bombings.
- On 1 October, Mufti Abdul Hannan, the chief of Harkat-ul-Jihad-al-Islami Bangladesh, was arrested.
- On 3 October, Chittagong court, Chandpur Court and Laxmipur court were attacked with bombs.
- On 14 November, JMB killed two judges in bomb attack in Jhalaikathi.
- On 29 November, a suicide attack was carried out on Gazipur Courthouse.
- On 29 November, a bombing took place at a Chittagong court house.
- On 8 December, a suicide bomb attack occurred at a festival in Netrokona.

==== 2006 ====
- On 19 December, a top leader of Jamaat-ul-Mujahideen Bangladesh, Abdullah al-Tasnim, was arrested by police.

==== 2008 ====
- On 1 January, Amirul Islam, a regional leader of the Biplobi Communist Party, was killed in a shootout with police.

==== 2009 ====
- On 30 October, three people were killed in a bomb attack on Shah Jalal Dargah.

==== 2011 ====
- On 28 July, the court of the Chief Metropolitan Magistrate in Rajshahi sentenced the founder of Shahadat-e al Hiqma, Sayed Kawsar Hossain Siddique, to jail.

2013

- On 7 October 2013, three people were killed while making bombs at a dorm of the Jamiatul Uloom Al-Islamia Lalkhan Bazar. The madrassah was founded by Izharul Islam Chowdhury, founding leader of the Harkat-ul Jihad al-Islami Bangladesh, and Ameer of Hefazat-e-Islam Bangladesh.

==== 2014 ====
- On 28 January, a PBCP leader, Islam Sabuj, was killed in a shootout with police.
- In April, Abdullah al-Tasnim was bailed out of jail.
- In July, Jakir Khandakar allegedly reactivated Shahadat-e al Hiqma and shifted headquarters to Bandarban District, Chittagong.
- On 17 September, acting on a tip, Rapid Action Battalion discovered and dismantled a weapons and explosives storage facility located in the Satchhari forest, Chunarughat Upazila, Habiganj. 112 rocket launchers and 14 sacks of explosive material were confiscated during the operation.
- On 18 September, police arrested seven JMB militants, including a top commander, Abdullah al-Tasnim, in the Landing Station Port area. The militants intended to utilise 10 kilograms of liquid explosives, in several terrorist acts throughout the country, to establish cooperation with ISIL.
- On 1 November, a Rapid Action Battalion operation led to the capture of JMB's main coordinator, Abdun Nur, as well as four other militants. IED components were also seized.

==== 2015 ====
- On 26 February, Bangladeshi-American blogger, Avijit Roy, and his wife, Bonya Ahmed, were attacked by members of Ansarullah Bangla Team with machetes. Roy died while Ahmed survived
- On 5 November, a 'top leader' of the PBSP-MBRM and former cadre of the GMF, Sahinur Rahman, was killed in a shootout with the Detective Branch of the Bangladesh Police at Sadar Upazila, Rajbari District.

==== 2016 ====
- On 15 March, ISIL claimed responsibility for murdering a Muslim preacher in Bangladesh.
- On 22 March, unidentified attackers hacked a Christian convert to death in northern Bangladesh. A day after, ISIL claimed responsibility for the attack.
- On 7 April, a secular blogger was hacked to death by Islamists who claimed to be part of al-Qaeda.
- On 23 April, a university professor, A. F. M. Rezaul Karim Siddique, was hacked to death on his way to work in northern Bangladesh. Without any evidence, ISIL claimed responsibility for the attack.
- On 25 April, al-Qaeda militants hacked LGBTQ activist, Xulhaz Mannan, and his friend to death in his apartment.
- On 30 April, a Hindu tailor was hacked to death in his store. ISIL claimed responsibility for the attack. On the next day, Bangladesh authorities arrested three ISIL suspects for the murder.
- On 21 May, a homeopathic doctor was hacked to death in Bangladesh. ISIL claimed responsibility for the attack.
- On 1 July, militants hacked a Buddhist farmer to death in Bandarban District. Mong Shwe Lung Marma, 55, was also vice president of the Awami League. ISIL fighters claimed responsibility for the murder.
- On 1 July, five attackers opened fire inside the Holey Artisan Bakery located in the Gulshan neighbourhood, which is also part of the diplomatic enclave of Dhaka. Around 22 civilians and two police officers were killed. All five attackers were killed by the commando units of the Bangladesh Armed Forces, who stormed the building.
- On 27 August, three militants, including Abu Dujanah al-Bengali, were killed during a joint forces raid at a house in Narayanganj Sadar Upazila.

==== 2017 ====
- On 14 March, a Muslim Sufi spiritual leader and his daughter were shot and hacked to death by unknown militants in northern Bangladesh.
- On 17 March, during the 2017 Dhaka RAB camp suicide bombing, a suicide bomber blew himself up inside an under-construction camp of the anti-crime Rapid Action Battalion, mildly injuring two security personnel.
- On 24 March, a suicide bomber blew himself up outside a police check-post on the road leading to Hazrat Shahjalal International Airport, causing no injuries to other people. ISIL claimed the attack.
- On 25 March, during the 2017 South Surma Upazila bombings, a suicide bombing killed four civilians and two police officers and wounded around 40 during a security forces raid on a suspected terrorist hideout in South Surma Upazila. ISIL claimed responsibility. Four militants were also killed.
- On 12 April, Mufti Abdul Hannan, the chief of Harkat-ul-Jihad al-Islami Bangladesh, alongside two associates, was executed at Kashimpur Central Jail almost 12 years after being arrested.

==== 2018 ====
- On 11 March, 35-year-old Notun Moni Chakma, a member of the United People's Democratic Front, was stabbed to death by unidentified assailants in Goboghona village, Rangamati.
- On 28 May, three members of the United People's Democratic Front were gunned down by unidentified assailants in Korolyachhari, Baghaichhari Upazila. The United People's Democratic Front blamed the attack on two rival groups, the PCJSS-MN Larma and the United People's Democratic Front (Democratic).

==== 2019 ====
- On 29 June, acting on a tipoff, Rapid Action Battalion (RAB) arrested five members of the banned militant outfit Ansar Al Islam (AAI) from the Belpukur area in Puthia Upazila of Rajshahi. RAB recovered a pistol, 24 crude bombs, five bullets, two magazines, 10 jihadi books, and eight organisational notebooks from them.
- On 26 August, members of the United People's Democratic Front engaged in a shootout with a group of patrolling soldiers in Dighinala Upazila, Khagrachhari, leaving three militants dead.

==== 2020 ====
- On 28 December, Rashidul Islam, a regional leader of Gono Mukti Fouz, was arrested by the RAB in Kushtia District, Khulna after a raid. One rifle, one pistol, 16 rounds of ammunition and "domestic weapons" were recovered.

==== 2021 ====
- On 18 January, a Khulna court sentenced five cadres of the Purbo Banglar Communist Party-Janajuddho to life imprisonment.
- In July, the United People's Democratic Front's Joan Chakma led a contingent of Buddhist-Chakmas to Suandrapara, a village of the Bawm Christian convert community, where they issued threats and conducted two raids, damaging a church.
- On 30 July, four members of the United People's Democratic Front were arrested in Langadu Upazila, Rangamati for extortion.

==== 2022 ====
- On 18 July, Bangladesh Police announced the arrests of Nur Mohammad, chairman of ARSA's fatwa committee, and Abu Bakkar, a commander of the group accused of the killings of Rohingyas in October 2021. The two were stated to have been arrested on 7 and 17 July, respectively. Armed Police Battalion unit 14 commander Naimul Haque claimed that they had arrested 836 Rohingyas linked to ARSA in the last six months.

==== 2023 ====
- On 21 July, ARSA commander Hafez Nur Mohammad was captured by the Rapid Action Battalion in Cox's Bazar.

==== 2024 ====
- On 18 May, two members of the United People's Democratic Front were shot dead by presumed rivals of the United People's Democratic Front in Langadu Upazila.
- On 9 June, four members of the Kuki-Chin National Front, identified as Moithang Bom, Jouthan Bom, Thomas Edison Bom, and Lal Ronih Sang Bom, were arrested in Jurvarongpara, Paindu Union, Ruma Upazila, Bandarban District.
- On 13 September, the Interim Government of Bangladesh released Jasimuddin Rahmani, the alleged "chief of the Al Qaeda-affiliated Ansarullah Bangla Team" who was convicted for "killing secular bloggers" and had reportedly urged the West Bengal state government to break away from India and declare independence.
- On 11 October, a Molotov cocktail was thrown at the Durga Puja pandal in Dhaka's Tantibazar. People chased the perpetrators, who injured four others by stabbing in an effort to escape.
- On 14 October, during the visarjan (immersion) of the Hindu idols, extremists began throwing bricks at Hindus from the roof of a building in old Dhaka. When some Hindus tried to go up to the building to stop the throwing, the police prevented the Hindus from going up. In this incident, two Hindus were injured.
- On 5 November, a mob reacted to a Facebook post calling ISKCON a "terrorist organisation". An incident occurred in Hazari Lane, Chittagong, Bangladesh. The mob, including members associated with ISKCON, attacked a local Muslim businessman who shared the post and attempted to burn down his shop in the vicinity. Over 80 people were detained and 49 arrests were made.
- On 17 November, accusing a Hindu youth of having a romantic relationship with a Muslim teenage girl in Karimganj, a boy was beaten severely in the presence of the army and, when taken to 'PAH Medical College Hospital,' the on-duty doctor officially declared him dead.
- On 2 December 2024, an attack took place at the Bangladesh Assistant High Commission in Agartala, the capital of the Indian state of Tripura. The attackers were identified as members of Hindu Sangharsh Samiti, affiliated to the far-right Hindutva group Vishva Hindu Parishad.
- On 7 December, the Shri Shri Mahabhagya Lakshmi Narayan Temple in the Turag area was set ablaze by pouring petrol or octane and lighting on fire The fire burned the idols inside the temple and goods worth approximately 1 lakh taka.

==== 2025 ====
- Operation Devil Hunt was launched on 8 February by the Yunus interim government. The operation hunts down supporters of Sheikh Hasina. On 9 February, 83 people, including Awami League politicians and members, were detained and 1,308 people were arrested across Bangladesh. By end of March, over 12 thousand people had been arrested.
- On 24 February, an Attack occurred on Bangladesh Air Force Base in Cox's Bazar when a group of "miscreants" launched an assault on the base located near the Samiti Para area in Cox's Bazar. One person was killed, and several were injured as a result of the clash.
- In March 2025, banned Islamist group Hizb ut-Tahrir attempted a "March for Khilafat" in Dhaka, gathering at Baitul Mukarram Mosque. Police used tear gas and sound grenades to disperse the crowd; 36 members were detained following brick- and stone-throwing that injured at least 10, including journalists.
- On 18–20 March, Bangladeshi security forces detained Ataullah Abu Ammar Jununi, the leader of the Arakan Rohingya Salvation Army (ARSA), near Dhaka. He was arrested on charges including illegal entry, sabotage, and terrorist activity, alongside several other members.
- With Malaysia filing charges against 36 Bangladeshis for alleged involvement of ISIS in June 2025, the incident highlights risks in overseas labour channels and demands greater transparency in bilateral security coordination, beyond rhetorical commitments to global counterterrorism norms.
- On 14 July, 2 people were arrested in suspecting links with the Tehreek-e-Taliban. One individual, " Shamin Mahfuz " was arrested in Narayanganj.
- On 27 December 2025, a devastating explosion occurred at a madrasa in Hasnabad, South Keraniganj, Dhaka. Four people, including women and children, were injured in the incident. Authorities found cocktails, chemical substances, and around 250 kilograms of bomb-making materials at the scene.

== Public perception ==
Public perception in Bangladesh suggests growing concern over youth radicalization since 2009, with observers linking it to both local and global influences. Ideology is often seen as a key factor, with groups like ISIS and Al-Qaeda reportedly targeting educated youth. A "Pyramid Root Cause model" has been proposed to explain this trend.

Dhaka Range Deputy Inspector General (DIG) of Police Md Rezaul Karim Mallick stated that there has been no real militancy in Bangladesh over the past 18 years, describing previous concerns as a "drama." Speaking at an anti-terrorism rally in Shariatpur, his remarks have drawn criticism from observers who argue that such comments overlook documented incidents and undermine efforts by law enforcement and counterterrorism agencies. He was earlier removed from his post due to a similar widespread criticism.

== See also ==
- Chittagong Hill Tracts conflict
- ISIL in Bangladesh
- Naxalite–Maoist insurgency
- Attacks by Islamic extremists in Bangladesh
- Islamic terrorism in Europe
- List of terrorist incidents
- Terrorism in the United States
- Hindu terrorism
- Violence against Muslims in independent India
- Left-wing terrorism
- Right-wing terrorism
- Hazari Lane Violence
