= Mohammad Yunus (academic) =

Mohammad Yunus was a Bangladeshi academic and Professor of economics at the University of Rajshahi. He was assassinated on 24 December 2004 by the Islamist terrorist organization Jamatul Mujahideen Bangladesh. He was one of four professors assassinated at Rajshahi University.

== Career ==
Yunus was a professor of economics at the University of Rajshahi. He was the president of Bangabandhu Parishad of Rajshahi. He was the vice president of Bangladesh Economic Association. He was the former registrar of Rajshahi University. He was politically liberal and left leaning.

As the registrar of Rajshahi University he served a show cause notice to Muhammad Asadullah Al-Ghalib, an Islamist and professor of Rajshahi University.

== Death ==
Yunus was killed in Binodpur, Rajshahi City while on his morning walk on 24 December 2004.

=== Trial ===
Shahidullah aka Mahbub and Safiullah were charged with the murder along with 6 others by Criminal Investigation Department of Bangladesh Police. Safiullah was arrested on 13 April 2006. He confessed to the police and claimed the killings were carried on the orders of Shaykh Abdur Rahman, the head of Jamatul Mujahideen Bangladesh. Shahidullah was arrested soon after from Bogra. He was the son-in-law of Rafiqul Islam, older brother of Siddikur Rahman alias Bangla Bhai, the military head of Jamatul Mujahideen Bangladesh. The Criminal Investigation Department filed charges on 10 September 2007.

In 2009 the case was moved to the speedy trial tribunal. The convicts appealed the verdict at Bangladesh High Court which the High Court granted. The tribunal sentenced two of the accused to death and acquitted 6 other accused in 2010. At a retrial, Justice Golam Ahmed Khalilul of Rajshahi Speedy Trial Tribunal reduced the sentence of the two convicts, Shahidullah and Safiullah, to life imprisonment on 24 February 2016.

== See also ==
- Murder of S Taher Ahmed
- Murder of A. F. M. Rezaul Karim Siddique
- Murder of A. K. M. Shafiul Islam
- Murder of Asma Sadia Runa
