= Abdullah al-Tasnim =

Former Bangladeshi militant

- আবদুল্লাহ আল-তাসনিম
- Born: Abdullah al-Tasnim আবদুল্লাহ আল-তাসনিম; 1986 (age 39–40); Dhaka, Bangladesh
- Other names: Nahid
- Occupation: Islamist militant (2004–2014)
- Years active: 2004–2014
- Employer: Shaykh Abdur Rahman (executed) (2004–2014)
- Parent: Abdul Hamid (father)
- Relatives: Abdullah al-Sohel (brother); Taiyabur Rahman Hasan (brother)
- Allegiance: Jamaat-ul-Mujahideen Bangladesh (2004–2014); Neo-Jamaat-ul-Mujahideen Bangladesh (April 2014 – September 2014)

Abdullah al-Tasnim (Bengali: আবদুল্লাহ আল-তাসনিম; born 1986), also known by the alias Nahid (Bengali: নাহিদ), is a former Bangladeshi Islamist militant that used to be a top leader in Jamaat-ul-Mujahideen Bangladesh and Neo-Jamaat-ul-Mujahideen Bangladesh.

== Early life ==
Abdullah al-Tasnim was born in Dhaka Division of Bangladesh on 1986 to a highly educated conservative family. al-Tasnim's father is the late professor Abdul Hamid and he also has at least two brothers. One of al-Tasnim's uncles was a professor at Jahangirnagar University and another was a secretary in the Government of Bangladesh. In 2004, al-Tasnim was pursuing higher secondary education at Tamir-ul-Millat Alia madrasa in Tongi, and he was admitted to the English department of Government Saadat College in Karatia, Tangail after passing Alim from the Tamir-ul-Millat Alia madrasa.

== Jamaat-ul-Mujahideen Bangladesh ==
On a Friday in 2004, al-Tasnim attended a khutbah that was led by Shaykh Abdur Rahman at a mosque in Dhamrai, who noted down the names and addresses of al-Tasnim and others to identify the people that wanted to be part of the group. After expressing allegiance to Rahman, Rahman gave al-Tasnim the task to expand JMB's student wing. His brothers Abdullah al-Sohel and Taiyabur Rahman Hasan also joined the JMB student wing. On 19 December 2006, al-Tasnim was arrested by the police due to the 2005 bomb blasts that were done by JMB.

al-Tasnim then bailed out of jail in April 2014 and tried to go to Saudi Arabia before being approached by members of Neo-Jamaat-ul-Mujahideen Bangladesh who asked him to join Neo-JMB. On 18 September 2014, he was arrested again and sent to Kashimpur High Security Prison.

=== After arrest ===
Seven years after his arrest, in 2021, Tasnim was interviewed under special arrangements at the Kashimpur Prison, and he said that he will probably never get out of jail and:

Violence can’t promote Islam. The people who are working to establish Islam through violence are making a mistake. I got involved in militant activities in my youth but finally I’ve realized that it was wrong. Many young people like me are misguided. Now I feel that no one can force anyone to continue religious activities through oppression; rather, the process should be simple and non-violent.
