= Killing of Mizanur Rahman Tutul =

2008 extrajudicial killing

- Date: 27 July 2008
- Location: Naogaon District, Bangladesh
- Perpetrator: Rapid Action Battalion

On 27 July 2008, physician and political activist Mizanur Rahman Tutul was shot dead by police officers in an act of extrajudicial killing. Tutul was a high-ranking member of the banned Purbo Banglar Communist Party, and led the Lal Pataka (Red Flag) faction.

== Background ==
=== Purbo Banglar Communist Party ===
The Purbo Banglar Communist Party (PBCP) is one of several armed leftist groups which are involved in an ongoing insurgency against the government of Bangladesh. The PBCP is known to be rivals with other leftist groups, such as the Biplobi Communist Party. Furthermore, the PBCP is split into several factions, including the Lal Pataka (Red Flag) faction which Dr Tutul led.

=== Mizanur Rahman Tutul ===
Dr. Mizanur Rahman Tutul
- ডাঃ মিজানুর রহমান টুটুল
- Born: 1959
- Died: 26 July 2008; Kaligram, Jhenaidah District, Khulna Division, Bangladesh
- Cause of death: Gunshot wound (officially cited as "killed in crossfire" during a police shootout; labeled an extrajudicial killing by multiple human rights groups)
- Other name: Comrade Mizanur
- Education: Rajshahi Medical College
- Occupation: Physician / Political Activist
- Years active: 1997–2008
- Political party: Purbo Banglar Communist Party (Lal Pataka)
- Opponent: Rapid Action Battalion

Mizanur Rahman Tutul (1959 – 26 July 2008) became acquainted with PCBP leader Mofakkhar Chowdhury, while studying an MBBS at Rajshahi Medical College. Upon completing his studies in 1985, he worked as a physician for a year before going underground in 1986. He is alleged to have handed his medical degree to his father, stating "You asked me to become a doctor and I have obtained the certificate. Keep it".

By the mid-1990s, Tutul developed a rivalry with Mofakkhar Chowdhury, leading to Tutul and another PCBP member, Quamrul Islam, to form a new splinter group named Purbo Banglar Communist Party Lal Pataka (Red Flag). In 2006 Quamrul Islam was killed by the police, following which Tutul became the leader of the Lal Pataka faction. During this time, Tutul expressed support for the Maoist insurgency in Nepal.

Tutul's mother stated that he sold much of their family's ancestral land for the welfare of the poor.

== Arrest and killing ==
Tutul was arrested by Rapid Action Battalion (RAB) in Uttara during the early hours of 25 July 2006. Tutul's mother was questioned by the police to confirm the identity of her son. Later that day, Tutul's mother held a press conference at Jhenidah Press Club, calling on the government not to kill her son.

The details of Tutul's death remain unclear. The official police report stated that 80 police officers cordoned off a field where 50 to 60 armed PBCP members were alleged to be having a meeting. The police stated that the PBCP members opened fire, following which the police returned fire. It is alleged that the PBCP members fled the scene, and the bullet riddled body of Tutul was left behind. Based on this version of events, the police described Tutul's death as occurring due to crossfire.

However, the human rights organisation Odhikar questioned the veracity of this story, and described how extrajudicial killings in Bangladesh are often attributed to "crossfire". Furthermore, an autopsy revealed that Tutul had been tied up and shot three times.

== Aftermath ==
In August 2008, 19 doctors released a joint statement calling for a judicial investigation into the true circumstances surrounding Tutul's death. The 19 doctors stated that while they do not agree with Dr Tutul's politics, he should not have been killed in a crossfire incident.
