= Ubaidul Haq =

Bangladeshi Islamic scholar and Khatib of National Mosque

Maulana Ubaidul Haq

3rd Khatib of Baitul Mukarram National Mosque
- In office In office 1984–2007

Personal life
- Born: 2 May 1928 Barothakuri, Zakiganj Upazila, Sylhet District, British India (present-day Sylhet District, Bangladesh)
- Died: 6 October 2007 (aged 79) Dhaka, Bangladesh
- Notable work: International Majlis-e Tahaffuz-e-Khatm-e Nobuwat Bangladesh
- Education: Darul Uloom Deoband

Religious life
- Religion: Islam
- Denomination: Sunni
- Jurisprudence: Hanafi
- Movement: Deobandi

Muslim leader
- Students: Khandaker Abdullah Jahangir
- Influenced by: Hussain Ahmad Madani Muhammad Ilyas Kandhlawi

Ubaidul Haq (Bengali: উবায়দুল হক; 2 May 1928 – 6 October 2007), also spelt Obaidul Haq (Bengali: ওবাইবদুল হক), was a Bangladeshi teacher, muhaddith, mufassir and writer. He was the former khatib of the national mosque of Bangladesh.

== Early life and education ==
Obaidul Haq was born on 2 May 1928 into a traditional Bengali Muslim family in Barothakuri, Zakiganj, Sylhet District. His father, Maulana Zahurul Haq was a notable student of Ashraf Ali Thanwi and graduated in Hadith studies from the Darul Uloom Deoband in 1335. His mother was Musammat Aisha Begum. Haq was the second son out of three sons. His elder brother, Ahmadul Haq, collected old books and was the owner of a store known as the Ashrafiyyah Kutubkhana, which opened in Zindabazar, Sylhet not long after the Independence of Bangladesh in 1971. His younger brother, Mawlana Abdul Haq (1930-2022), was a graduate of the Government Madrasah-e-Alia in Dhaka and a teacher of Hadith at a Qaumi Madrasa.

Obaidul Haq first studied at the Ghungadi Madrasah where he was taught Persian books such as Mizan Munshaib by Maulana Shamsul Haq. Two years later, he studied at a madrasa in Habiganj under Mawlana Muddathir Ahmad and Mawlana Musir Ali - both graduates of the Darul Uloom Deoband. Obaidul Haq then studied at Munshibazar Ayargaon Madrasa, founded by his father. In 1942, he enrolled in Darul Uloom Deoband and received his vocation in Tafsir and Hadith from Hussain Ahmad Madani and Muhammad Ilyas Kandhlawi.

== Career ==
Obaidul Haq started his career as a teacher in joined Dhaka's Hossainya Ashraful Ulum Madrasa near Bara Katra from 1949, teaching hadith studies. In 1953, he began teaching at the Nanak Wara Madrasa in Karachi. He returned to Bengal in 1954, joining as a teacher at the Dhaka Alia Madrasa, where he taught hadith studies between until 1971 and served as the additional vice principal from 1973 through 1979. He was the Shaikhul Hadith at Chittagong's Patia Madrasa between 1986 and 1987, and held the same position at Sylhet's Jamia Qasimul Uloom Dargah Madrasa from 1987 until his death.

He was also a professor at Faizul Uloom Madrasa at Azimpur in the Dhaka.

=== Khatib of Baitul Mukarram ===
He was the longest serving khatib of Baitul Mukarram, the national mosque of Bangladesh. In 2001, he was forced into retirement by the then Awami League government. He then sought a writ petition which overturned the government's decision.

== Anti-terror agitation ==
At a conference on 1 April 2005, organised in Paltan Maidan, Dhaka by the Jamiat-e-Ulema-e-Islam he along with the leading ulema of India, Pakistan and Bangladesh declared a fatwa denouncing terrorism.

Later that year, after a series of bombings in Bangladesh he led thousands of worshipers and political activists in a prayer and massive demonstration denouncing terrorism. He remarked that those who were killing people with bombs, were the enemies of Islam and people as well.

== Views ==
In 1994, he expressed concern over the growing support for the unfair practices of Christian proselytizers by non-governmental organisations and the sympathy for them by Bangladeshi left-wing political parties.

On 21 March 2003, he led a large anti-war rally in protest of the invasion of Iraq with Fazlul Haque Amini, where he remarked that:

The US will occupy all the oil-rich Middle East and Muslim countries, including Saudi Arabia and Kuwait, gradually.

In 2005, following the series of bombings by the banned outfit Jama'atul Mujahideen Bangladesh (JMB) while leading the protest denouncing terrorism he remarked:

Islam prohibits suicide bombings. These bombers are enemies of Islam. It is a duty for all Muslims to stand up against those who are killing people in the name of Islam.

== Death and succession ==
He died in the month of Ramadan on October 6, 2007. President Iajuddin Ahmed, Finance Minister Saifur Rahman, Iranian President Akbar Hashemi Rafsanjani, Taqi Usmani, Abdur Rauf, Qazi Din Muhammad, Shah Ahmad Shafi, and others mourned his death. His funeral prayers were held at the Jatiya Idgah under the imamate of his son, Ataul Haque. President, Chief Adviser to Caretaker Government Fakhruddin Ahmed, along with Adviser on Information and Religion, Army Chief Moin Uddin Ahmed, Former President Hussain Muhammad Ershad, Matiur Rahman Nizami, Azizul Haque, Fazlul Haque Amini, Syed Rezaul Karim, and others participated in his funeral. He was buried at Azimpur Cemetery.

In 2014, an MPhil dissertation by Syed Rezwan Ahmed on his life work was published. In 2007, a commemorative issue of the weekly Muslim Jahan was published in his memory. In 2008, the Khatibe Millat Memorial was published by the Allama Khatib Commemoration Implementation Committee from Zakiganj, Sylhet.

== Books ==
- Seerat-e-Mustafa (Biography of the Chosen One, Urdu)
- Nasrul Fawaid
- Sharh e Shekhwah wa Jawaab e Shekwah
- Azharul Azhab Sharh-e-Noorul Anwar Usul-e-Fiqah (Urdu)
- Tarikh-e-Islam (Urdu)
- Quran-e-Hakim aur Hamari Zindagi (Urdu)
- Shia Sunni Ikhtilaf (Urdu)
- Quran Bujhibar Poth (Path to Understanding the Quran, Bengali)
