= Jagrata Muslim Janata Bangladesh =

Bangladeshi Islamic terrorist Organizations

Jagrata Muslim Janata Bangladesh (Bengali: জাগ্রত মুসলিম জনতা বাংলাদেশ, lit. 'Awakened Muslim Masses of Bangladesh', abbreviated: JMJB), is an Islamist extremist group operating in and around northwestern Bangladesh. The Government of Bangladesh has banned the JMJB, classifying it as a terrorist organization. It is described by Bangladeshi police as an offshoot of the related Jamaat-ul-Mujahideen Bangladesh outfit.

== Early history ==
Formed in 2003 and 2004 in Rajshahi District's Bagmara Upazila, the organization initially received support from some government officials, in hopes they would target other insurgents operating in the country. The group also attacked Awami League politicians with the support of the Bangladesh Nationalist Party and Bangladesh Jamaat-e-Islami leadership. According to leaked US diplomatic cables, the Prime Minister Khaleda Zia's son, Tarique Rahman, requested the release of the group's leader to their own government. Despite this, the JMJB was banned on 23 February 2005.

== Leadership ==
The organization's leaders included its commander Siddique ul-Islam (better known as Bangla Bhai), and Shaykh Abdur Rahman. After the Government of Bangladesh offered a large reward for the capture of Bangla Bhai, he was detained by the elite Rapid Action Battalion in Mymensingh District on 6 March 2006. Both he and Shaykh Abdur Rahman were executed on 30 March 2007.

== Ideology ==
The JMJB is extremely critical part of the Jamaat-e-Islami Bangladesh party, which it deems as heretical due to its participation in the Bangladeshi political establishment, patronisation of secularism, and sacrilege of Islamic values and principles. The group's ideology is inspired by that of the Afghan Taliban, and it is a proponent of Sharia law in Bangladesh. The JMJB was urged by some of the Bangladesh Nationalist Party to attack members of the militant Purbo Banglar Communist Party.
