= Murder of A. K. M. Shafiul Islam =

2014 murder in Bangladesh

- Location: Rajshahi, Bangladesh
- Date: 15 November 2014
- Target: A. K. M. Shafiul Islam
- Attack type: Stabbing
- Weapon: Machetes
- Deaths: 1
- Accused: 11
- Charges: Murder; Conspiracy to murder
- Verdict: Guilty, sentenced to death
- Convictions: Murder
- Convicted: 3
- Judge: Anup Kumar

The murder of A. K. M. Shafiul Islam refers to the murder of University of Rajshahi professor A. K. M. Shafiul Islam in 2014. He was known to be a progressive and fan of lalon music. He was one of four teachers of the university killed in the last two decades.

== History ==
In 2012, A. K. M. Shafiul Islam led an effort to ban the Burkha at the University of Rajshahi because of which he had faced criticism by Islamists. He viewed the veil as a threat because it would make it difficult to identify students and they could use it to cheat in examinations. In 2010 a newspaper aligned with the Bangladesh Jamaat-e-Islami party reported that Islam had banned the Burkha in his department. Islam sent a rejoinder where he stated that only one student was expelled for cheating using the burkha.

=== Incident ===
On 15 November 2014, Islam was attacked and stabbed near Bihashpalli. He tried to reach a hospital using a rickshaw after the attack but fell down after passing out near the University of Rajshahi campus. Pedestrians there took him to Rajshahi Medical College and Hospital. At 4:00 pm, he died in the operation theatre. Following the news of the attack and his death; students of the university blocked Dhaka-Rajshahi Highway. Rajshahi University Teachers Association announced a boycott of classes.

A Facebook page of Ansarullah Bangla Team, a banned Islamist terrorist organisation, claimed responsibility of the attack and murder. The post said they killed him for being an apostate and for banning students from wearing the full veil (burkha) in his classroom. The Islamic State also claimed responsibility of the murder.

=== Trial ===
The police investigators suspected the involvement of Islamic militants and arrested three militants. Two weeks after the murder Rapid Action Battalion arrested six individuals associated with the opposition party, Bangladesh Nationalist Party, and presented them to the media in Dhaka. They claimed the six individuals had made confessional statements. The investigators claimed that the suspects resented the Lalon music nights organised twice a week by A. K. M. Shafiul Islam at his residence. The charge sheet against the 11 accused was submitted by Inspector Rezaus Sadik of the Detective Branch. Anwar Hossain Ujjal is the Joint General Secretary of Rajshahi District unit of Bangladesh Nationalist Party. The case was based on the confessional statement of Nasrin Akhter Reshma, wife of Abdus Samad Pintu.

On 16 April 2019, Justice Anup Kumar of the Speedy Trial Tribunal in Rajshahi sentenced three to death for the murder of A. K. M. Shafiul Islam. The three were Abdus Samad Pintu, a member of Bangladesh Jatiotabadi Jubo Dal which is the youth wing of Bangladesh Nationalist Party, Ariful Islam Manik, was the organising secretary of Katakhali municipal unit of Bangladesh Jatiotabadi Jubo Dal, and Mohammad Sabuj Sheikh. Pintu had an argument with Islam and threatened to kill him after Islam allegedly misbehaved with Pintu's wife. The court also found eight of the accused innocent after the prosecution failed to prove their case. Pintu maintained his innocence after the verdict. Sabuj Sheikh has not been arrested and is currently a fugitive.

== See also ==
- Murder of S Taher Ahmed
- Murder of A. F. M. Rezaul Karim Siddique
- Mohammad Yunus (academic)
- Murder of Asma Sadia Runa
