= Ashulia bank robbery =

2015 bank robbery in Bangladesh

Ashulia bank robbery was a robbery of the Ashulia branch of Bangladesh Commerce Bank Limited by members of Jama'atul Mujahideen Bangladesh and Ansarullah Bangla Team, both of which are Jihadist terror organizations, to raise funds for terror attacks in 2015. The terrorists killed 7 civilians in the bank during the robbery and one terrorist was killed while fleeing the scene. In 2016, six of the robbers were sentenced to death for their part in the robbery.

== Events ==
On 21 April 2015, an estimated 8–10 robbers arrived at Kathgora Bazar in Ashulia Industrial Area on three bikes. They entered the Bangladesh Commerce Bank Limited around 2:00 pm and asked the 15 people inside the bank to lie down on the ground. They killed the two armed security guard, Ibrahim and Kazi Badrul Alam, and the bank manager. The robbers had asked the manager, Waliullah Subin, to hand over the vault key, but he refused and tried to escape. He was shot and killed by the robbers. Hearing the shots, residents of the area raised alarm and sought aid using the loudspeaker of a mosque that was opposite of the bank. Some 200 locals arrived outside the bank hearing the call for help. The robbers also killed a client of the bank, Shahabuddin Mollah Palash.

The robbers stole 3.5 million taka from the cash counter but had failed to break open the vault. The robbers exploded bombs and stabbed people randomly while attempting to escape in the chaos and confusion. The robbers tried to escape on three motorbikes and some on foot while the residents chased after them. Three local residents, Jamir Ali, Monir Hossain, and Nur Mohammad, were killed by the robbers' gunfire and bombs as they were chasing after them. The residents were able to catch two robbers; one was lynched by the mob while another was handed over to the police.

== Investigation ==
The police suspected that the robbery was the work of militants. On 5 May 2015, Bangladesh Police arrest one member of Ansarullah Bangla Team in connection with the robbery. Ansarullah Bangla Team is a Jihadist terrorist organisation in Bangladesh and is ideologically aligned with the Al Qaeda.

== Trial ==
On 1 December 2015, Bangladesh police filed one case for robbery and murder and another case for using explosives. According to the investigation of Bangladesh police in Ashulia 16 people were involved in the planning and executing the robbery. One of the accused was killed by civilians while fleeing the scene of the robbery while another accused was killed in a gunfight with police officers in Gabtoli, Dhaka.

On 21 January 2016, a court in Dhaka framed charges against 11 accused and began trial proceedings. Abdullah Al Baki, the mastermind of the robbery according to the case, was a member of Ansarullah Bangla Team and was formerly a member of Jama'atul Mujahideen Bangladesh. Dipak Kumar Saha, the Officer in Charge (OC) of Ashulia Police Station was the lead investigator of the case.

On 1 June 2016, a court in Dhaka gave death sentences to six of the accused, one was given a life sentence, two were sentenced to three years imprisonment, and two other accused were acquitted. Judge SM Kuddus Zaman presided over the case and cited the lack of remorse among the accused as the reason behind the death sentence.
