= 2017 Dhaka RAB camp suicide bombing =

Terrorist incident in Bangladesh

Coordinates: 23.8504°N 90.4108°E

- Location: Uttara, Dhaka, Bangladesh
- Date: 17 March 2017
- Target: RAB
- Attack type: Terrorist attack
- Weapon: explosive belt
- Deaths: 1 (The Bomber)
- Injuries: 2
- Perpetrator: Islamic State of Iraq and the Levant
- Assailant: one suicide bomber

The 2017 Dhaka RAB Camp suicide bombing was an attempted suicide attack in the under construction compound of the elite Rapid Action Battalion in Dhaka, Bangladesh on 17 March 2017. The bombing failed to cause any injuries or deaths, other than the death of the lone suicide bomber.

== Background ==
The Islamic State of Iraq and the Levant had called for suicide attacks in Bangladesh on 15 March 2017. Suicide attacks are rare in Bangladesh.

== Attack ==
On 17 March 2017 a suicide bomber the entered under-construction Rapid Action Battalion headquarters in Ashkona, Dhaka, Bangladesh and detonated his vest. The suspected bomber was killed in the explosion and two RAB officers were injured. The injured officers, Lance Corporal Mizan and Constable Arif, were rushed to Dhaka Combined Military Hospital. The incident happened outside a makeshift camp located near the Haji Camp at Ashkona. The assault comes only two days after ISIL called for suicide attacks in Bangladesh, and one day after two militants of New JMB group blew themselves up to evade arrest by the Counter Terrorism and Transnational Crime Unit during a raid in Chittagong's Sitakunda. The attack happened at Bangladeshi Local time 1:10 P.M. in Uttara, Bangladesh.

The attack followed what had been a lull in Islamist attacks in Bangladesh.

The Islamic State of Iraq and the Levant claimed responsibility for this terror attack.

== See also ==
- July 2016 Dhaka attack
- 2017 South Surma Upazila bombings
