= 2005 Jhalakathi bombing =

Terrorist incident in Bangladesh

- Location: Jhalakathi, Bangladesh
- Date: 14 November 2005 (UTC+06:00)
- Target: Judiciary of Bangladesh
- Attack type: Bombs
- Deaths: 2
- Injuries: 3+
- Perpetrator: Jamaat-ul-Mujahideen Bangladesh

2005 Jhalakathi bombing was a bombing of a car transporting judges to the District Court of Jhalakathi. Jama'atul Mujahideen Bangladesh (JMB) claimed responsibility for the bombings. The group, led by Shaykh Abdur Rahman and Siddiqur Rahman (also known as Bangla Bhai).

== Attacks ==
Jama'atul Mujahideen Bangladesh is a radical Islamist organization that is demanding the implementation of Sharia Law in Bangladesh. As such they target the judiciary in the attack. On 14 November 2005 a bomb was thrown at a car transporting judges to the District Court of Jhalakathi. The attacks took place Jhalakathi district in southern Bangladesh. The Judges were inside a vehicle. The vehicle was parked as they were waiting for another Judge. The attackers tried to give the judges leaflets which they refused. A bomb was thrown at the vehicle. Two senior assistant judges Sohel Ahmed and Jagannath Pandey, were killed in the bomb attack. A court employee and a bystander were injured in the attack. A 13-year-old school student was also injured. Iftekhar Hossain Mamun the attacker was also injured.

== Victims ==
- Shaheed Sohel Ahmed was 35 years old, senior assistant judge of Nalchity Upazila of Jhalakathi District.
- Jagannath Pandey was 38 years old, senior assistant judge of the Jhalakathi Sadar upazila.

== Attacker ==
The 28-year-old attacker, Iftekhar Hasan Al Mamun, was captured injured by the bystanders. He had a bomb strapped to his leg and leaflets calling for Sharia Law. The local handed the suspect over to Rapid Action Battalion and Bangladesh Police.

== Trial ==
On 29 May 2006 A court in Jhalakathi awarded death penalty to 7 members of JMB. The verdict was upheld by the High Court of Bangladesh on 31 August 2006. The Appellate Division rejected their appeals on 28 November 2006. On 29 May 2007 6 of the convicts were executed. The last convict was arrested on 10 July 2007. On 28 August 2016 the Supreme court upheld his death sentence. He was executed on 16 October. The Leader and Military leader of JMB Abdur Rahman and Bangla Bhai among those convicted in the case.
