= Murder of S Taher Ahmed =

2006 murder in Bangladesh

Syed Taher Ahmed was a professor of geology and mining at the University of Rajshahi in Bangladesh who was missing on 1 February 2006 and was found dead two days later. Ahmed, aged 58, was a senior member of the planning committee that evaluates application of teachers for promotion. In 2005, his junior colleague and once a close friend, Mia Mohammad Mohiuddin, applied for promotion to full professor. Ahmed discovered inconsistencies in the application; Mohiuddin had not served the required 12-year-academic service, and more critically, had plagiarised and pirated ten of the eleven research papers he submitted. Mohiuddin's fate was to be decided by the planning committee on 2 February 2006. With his career was at stake, Mohiuddin hired Jahangir Alam, caretaker of the university's quarters. Alam, assisted by his brother Abdus Salam and brother-in-law Nazmul, killed Ahmed in the night of 1 February 2006.

Learning that his father was not present in the meeting on 2 February 2006 and could not be contacted, Sanjid Alvi Ahmed search the university campus to find his father's body in a septic tank sewer near his quarters on 3 February. The police started a murder investigation and took Alam as the prime suspect. As Ahmed's phone was recovered from Alam's residence, Alam confessed to his involvement and that Mohiuddin had promised a reward to his family for carrying out the murder. Mahbubul Alam Salehi, president of University of Rajshahi unit of Bangladesh Islami Chhatra Shibir, and Azimuddin Munshi, Jahangir's father, were also accused to have part in the crime.

On 23 May 2008, the Speedy Trial Tribunal in Rajshahi made the verdict; Mohiuddin, Alam, Salam, and Nazmul were given death sentence, while Salehi and Munshi were acquitted. After a plea at higher tribunal, the Bangladesh High Court reduced the sentence of Salam and Nazmul to life imprisonment in 2013. Mohiuddin and Alam were executed on 27 July 2023.

== Background ==
Syed Taher Ahmed was a professor in the Department of Geology and Mining at the University of Rajshahi in Motihar, Rajshahi, Bangladesh. As a senior faculty member, Ahmed was the head of the planning committee on screening teachers's eligibility when they apply for promotion in their services. Under the University Grants Commission of Bangladesh, educational degrees like M.Phil. and Ph.D. along with publications in scholarly journals are the key yardsticks of eligibility. Ahmed's colleague, Mia (also spelled Miah) Mohammad Mohiuddin, who at the time was an associate professor, applied for promotion in 2006. Outside of the professional life, Mohiuddin had established a close friendship with Ahmed and had spent times at Ahmed's residence frequently. As Ahmed's daughter Shagufta Tabassum Ahmed later recalled: "Mohiuddin had once been a close family friend... had visited us so often in earlier [before 2005] years."

In early 2006, Shagufta joined a law degree course in Dhaka, a distance of 254 kilometers (158 miles) by road from Rajshahi, and stayed there with her mother Sultana Ahmed. Her elder brother Sanjid (also spelled Sanzid) Alvi Ahmed had also settled there. During the last week of January 2006, Ahmed was visiting his family in Dhaka, where he received a call for meeting on Mohiuddin's case.

=== Mia Mohammad Mohiuddin ===
Mohiuddin had a history of controversy. He studied M.Sc. in geology and mining at the University of Rajshahi, and his dissertation was supervised by Ahmed. As soon as his graduation, he was given appointment as a lecturer in the Department of Geology and Mining in December 1990, his selection largely influenced by Ahmed and Selina Khatun. Khan was then professor of in the Department of Geography and Environment Studies, and cousin of Mohiuddin's mother. Mohiuddin fondly called her "mother". However, he later claimed ownership of Khan's property after which Khan broke any family ties with him.

While a lecturer, Mohiuddin married the sister-in-law of the former Bangladesh Minister of Posts and Telecommunications, Aminul Haque. He soon became politically active in the Bangladesh Nationalist Party (BNP). Through political influences from the Bangladesh Jamaat-e-Islami (Jamaat), an ally of BNP, he was able to secure a scholarship for higher studies in Belgium in 1992. He returned home in 1994 before completing the course. With the influence of Jamaat, he again received research fellowship in Japan from where he returned in 1997 with a doctorate. He was given promotion to assistant professor on 30 March 1998. However, the promotion was put on probation as the university syndicate found that he did not completely satisfy the eligibility, which was a requirement of two research papers. The probation was set up to 3 March 2000. In 2005, the university's registrar reminded the head of the Department of Geology and Mining that Mohiuddin was not yet confirmed as an assistant professor as he failed to submit the research papers. Mohiuddin formally submitted the document on 16 May 2005. The departmental planning committee assessed the document from which Ahmed reported that there was only one research paper that was published in 1998.

On 13 May 2005, Mohiuddin had already applied for promotion to full professor to the registrar, which put the confirmation case aside as the planning committee was not a deciding body on such matter. The registrar then sent rejection notice to the department. Mohiuddin challenged the objection and was supported by the pro-BNP-Jamaat teachers. The departmental planning committee met on 5 July and revealed that Mohiuddin had taken more than eight years of academic leaves in his entire service and did not meet the required 12 years. In addition, Ahmed found a number of suspicious publications. On closer scrutiny, out of 11 Mohiuddin's research papers, 10 of them were plagiarised and pirated from other publications. The department recognised it as a serious breach of conduct. Ahmed submitted the decision to the registrar on 10 September. As instructed by the registrar, the planning committee was to make the final decision on 2 February 2006.

== Incident ==
Ahmed left Dhaka by bus in the afternoon of 1 February 2006. He called his wife at 9pm telling her that he reached the Rajshahi safely. However, he did not turn up at the committee meeting of the Department of Geology and Mining the next day. Learning the absence, Sultana called up but never received an answer. She rang the caretaker of the university quarters, Jahangir Alam, who claimed that Ahmed was not in the quarters and had not seen him arrived. Sultana told Sanjid to rush to Rajshahi who left by car that evening.

Sanjid started the search on 3 February. An unusual putrid smell from the sewer of Ahmed's quarters leading to septic tank was noticed. When they opened the manhole, the body of Ahmed was lying there with a bus ticket still in his coat pocket. Sanjid relayed the news to his family, saying, "They have found him. He's been killed." According to the coroner's report, he died sometime before 10pm on 1 February. Ahmed was 58 years old and police confirmed that he was beaten to death. Sanjid registered homicidal case at the Motihar Police Station on 3 February.

=== Investigation and arrest ===
Ahmed had no known enemy or rivalry that could led to his killing. The first suspect was his quarter's caretaker Alam, who had denied seeing him on the day of the disappearance. Police search team found Ahmed's phone in the residence of Alam. On 10 February 2006, Mohiuddin admitted his involvement with the murder during police interrogation. Mohiuddin believed that his career would end if Ahmed remained alive. The Rajshahi Metropolitan Police commissioner Naim Ahmed was instrumental in investigating the murder. His prompt actions and identification of the accused was appreciated by Members of Parliament from the then opposition party Awami League in the Jatiya Sangshad (parliament of Bangladesh).

On 10 February 2006, Jamaat-e-Islami Bangladesh held a rally with Mahbubul Alam Saleh and challenged members of the police to arrest him if they could. He was reported to have been involved in the murder.

After full investigations, on 18 March 2007, the police arrested:

1. Mia Mohammad Mohiuddin
2. Jahangir Alam
3. Abdus Salam, Alam's brother and an activist of Bangladesh Islami Chhatra Shibir
4. Nazmul Alam, Alam's brother-in-law
5. Azimuddin Munshi, Alam's father
6. Mahbubul Alam Salehi, President of University of Rajshahi unit of Bangladesh Islami Chhatra Shibir

After Mohammad Yunus, Ahmed was the second professor of University of Rajshahi to be killed by individuals with alleged links to Bangladesh Islami Chhatra Shibir. In August 2006, activists of Bangladesh Islami Chhatra Shibir threatened Professor Hasan Azizul Huq of the Philosophy Department of the university and accused him of being an atheist and anti-Islam.

== Trial ==
The trial in the case began on 18 June 2007 with six accused. On 3 February 2008, the students and faculty at University of Rajshahi called for a quick disposal of the case. Alam, Nazmul and Salam testified in the court that Mohiuddin had hired them for the murder with promises of money, computers and university jobs. Mohiuddin as the perpetrator was proven from the police report that established the deceptions played by Mohiuddin in his application for promotion. The three accused also declared Salehi as the perpetrator.

On 22 May 2008, Judge ATM Mesbauddoula of the Speedy Trial Tribunal in Rajshahi announced the verdict: death sentence to Mohiuddin, Alam, Salam and Nazmul. The court acquitted Salehi and Munshi.

Rajshahi unit president of Jamaat-e-Islami Bangladesh, Ataur Rahman, brought out a rally celebrating the verdict after members of his party's student wing were acquitted. Two former Vice-Chancellors of University of Rajshahi and teachers of the university expressed disappointment. Faculty of the University of Rajshahi and family members of Ahmed stated they felt unsafe after the release of Saleh.

=== Final verdict ===
The initial judgement was challenged at the Bangladesh High Court. On 21 April 2013 (or 13 May, according to other sources), the High Court upheld the lower court verdict but reduced the sentences of Salam and Nazmul to life imprisonment. Family members filed an appeal with the higher court seeking punishment for Mahbubul Alam Saleh. On 2 February 2021, students and teachers at the university demanded quick finalisation of the trial.

Mohiuddin and Alam, on death row, appealed the high court decision to the Supreme Court of Bangladesh. By then, Shagufta had become a lawyer in the Supreme Court, and claimed that as the case was processed, she and her brother received several threats from Jamaat workers. The Appellate Division of the Supreme Court reviewed the petitions from which Chief justice Hasan Foez Siddique issued an order that rejected the plea on 5 April (or 5 September) 2022. The verdict published on 14 September concludes:

In view of the evidence as discussed earlier we have no hesitation to hold that Dr Mohiuddin, a highly educated man and associate professor of Rajshahi University, only for the purpose of getting promoted to professor annihilated Dr Taher from this world presuming that if Professor Taher lived, the chance of his getting promotion would be zero.

A plea for pardon was submitted on 5 June 2023 to President Mohammed Shahabuddin who turn it down and informed the Rajshahi Central Jail on 26 June to proceed with the execution, which was to be by hanging. The Supreme Court issued an order on 25 July for execution.

=== Execution ===
On 27 July 2023, Mohiuddin and Alam were executed at Rajshahi Central Jail. The execution was carried out at 10.01pm and overseen by Rajshahi Deputy Commissioner Shamim Ahmed, Superintendent of Police ABM Masud, DIG Prison Kamal Hossain, Civil Surgeon Abu Said Md Farooq, and Deputy Commissioner of Police Abdul Raqib. The bodies were sent to their respective hometowns, Mohiuddin's to Jandi in Faridpur district, while Alam's to Khojapur in Rajshahi city, for burial. The family of Mohiuddin evaded the funeral on 29 July, and was taken care of by his brother Arju Miah.

== See also ==
- Murder of A. F. M. Rezaul Karim Siddique
- Mohammad Yunus (academic)
- Murder of A. K. M. Shafiul Islam
- Murder of Asma Sadia Runa
