= Baharul Alam =

31th Inspector General of Bangladesh Police

Baharul Alam BPM
- বাহারুল আলম
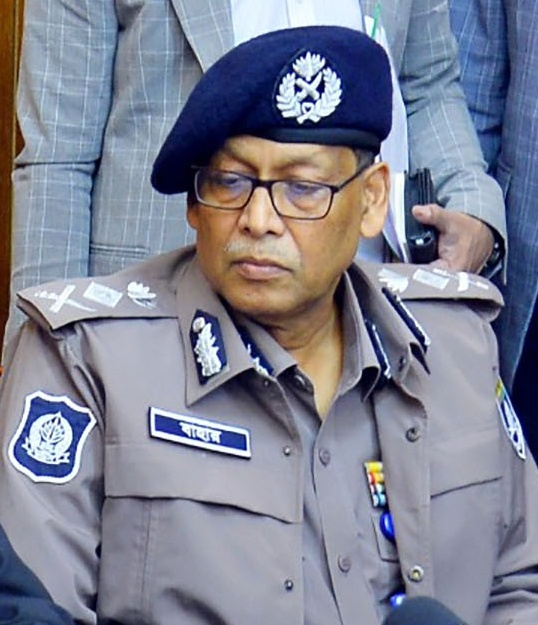
- Alam in 2025

Inspector General of Bangladesh Police
- In office 20 November 2024 – 24 February 2026
- President: Mohammed Shahabuddin
- Prime Minister: Muhammad Yunus (Chief adviser)
- Preceded by: Mainul Islam
- Succeeded by: Md. Ali Hossain Fakir

Personal details
- Born: 18 May 1960 (age 66) Kishoreganj, East Pakistan
- Spouse: Afroza Helen
- Education: Mymensingh Medical College (MBBS)
- Awards: Bangladesh Police Medal (Bravery) – BPM
- Police career
- Allegiance: Bangladesh
- Branch: Bangladesh Police
- Service years: 1986—2026
- Status: Retired
- Rank: IGP

Baharul Alam is a Bangladeshi physician and retired officer of the Bangladesh Police. He was the inspector general of police. He was appointed to the position on 20 November 2024. Prior to his appointment as IGP, he served as the head of hospital at ICDDR,B. He was former director general of the Rapid Action Battalion and former chief of Special Branch.

== Early life and education ==
Alam was born in 1960 into a distinguished Muslim family at the historic Kazla Munshibari Estate in Tarail Upazila of Kishoreganj District. He completed his SSC in 1975 at Mymensingh Zilla School and secured 1st place in the Dhaka board. He completed his HSC in 1977 from Dhaka Residential Model College with distinctions. He later completed his MBBS from Mymensingh Medical College. He joined the police service in 1984 through the BCS Police Cadre.

Alam is a Bangladeshi physician and administrator who was the head of hospitals at ICDDR,B. He graduated from Mymensingh Medical College with an MBBS in 1984 and later earned an MBA from Southeast University in 2008. After an early medical career, he joined the Bangladesh Civil Service in the police department, where he served in various capacities, including missions with the United Nations in New York, the former Yugoslavia, and Afghanistan.

== Career ==
Alam, as deputy inspector general of Rangpur Division, used police from Nilphamari District to target Jamaat-ul-Mujahideen Bangladesh in Rangpur District in November 2005, as he feared an information leak from the Rangpur District unit of police.

In February 2007, Alam was appointed director general of the Rapid Action Battalion. He served as the head of the Special Branch (SB) during 2007–08. He was transferred to police headquarters from Special Branch in March 2009, while Mohammad Javed Patwary was appointed chief of the Special Branch.

Later, Alam held various positions at the police headquarters. From 2009 to 2013, he worked as a police liaison officer in the United Nations peacekeeping division at its headquarters. In 2015, he served as a senior police advisor for the United Nations Peacekeeping Mission in Afghanistan. Before this, he was assigned duties in Croatia, Serbia, Kosovo, and Sierra Leone. Despite being passed over for promotion twice, he retired in 2020.

He also served as the head of hospital at ICDDR,B.

On 20 November 2024, Alam was made the inspector general of police on a contractual two year appointment.
