= Mymensingh cinema bombings =

Coordinated bombing of four movie theaters in Bangladesh on 6 December 2002

Mymensingh Cinema Hall Bombings
- Location: Mymensingh, Bangladesh
- Date: 6 December 2002 (UTC+06:00)
- Target: Movie Theatres
- Attack type: Bombs
- Deaths: 27
- Injuries: 200+
- Perpetrator: Jama’atul Mujahedeen Bangladesh

The Mymensingh cinema bombings were a coordinated bombing of four movie theaters that caused in the deaths of 27 people and injured over 200 others in Mymensingh, Bangladesh on 6 December 2002. The bombing was carried out by Jama’atul Mujahedeen Bangladesh.

== Background ==
The attack happened two months after a circus and cinema were bombed in Satkhira, Bangladesh. The attacks took place while the anti-crime Operation Clean Heart was ongoing. Soldiers from the operation were involved in the rescue and first-aid efforts. After the explosions, a bomb was found in Gaibandha, Bangladesh.

== Attack ==
The attacks took place following the Eid holidays, which meant the movie theaters were filled. On 6 December 2002 there were four simultaneous explosions in four different movie theaters.

== Trial ==
In 2007, Bangladesh Police charged three people with the crime. It also dropped the names of 43 people from the investigation which were added during the Bangladesh Nationalist Party Government including members of then opposition party Bangladesh Awami League and journalist. As of 2017, there has been no verdict in the case and the victims have not received any compensation.

== Reactions ==
The Prime Minister of Bangladesh, Khaleda Zia, blamed the opposition party Awami League and described it as a planned attack to destabilize the government.
