= Satkhira bombings =

2002 terrorist incident in Bangladesh

2002 Satkhira bombing
- Location: Satkhira, Bangladesh
- Date: 28 September 2002 (UTC+06:00)
- Target: general public
- Attack type: Triple murder; bomb attack; terrorism
- Weapon: Time bombs
- Deaths: 3
- Injuries: 100
- Perpetrator: Jamaat-ul-Mujahideen Bangladesh

2002 Satkhira bombing was a double bomb attack on 28 September 2002 of Roxy cinema hall and a circus tent in Satkhira District, Bangladesh that killed 3 people and injured 100 others.

== Attacks ==
Jamaat-ul-Mujahideen Bangladesh, a Bangladeshi Islamist terrorist organization, carried out attacks on the early 2000s in public places in Bangladesh.

A bomb was placed in a Roxy cinema hall and another inside a circus tent in Satkhira District on 28 September 2002. Three people died in the explosion and 100 others were injured. The first bomb went off in the cinema hall and minutes later the bomb in the circus went off. Time bombs were used in the attacks. Similar attacks took place in Mymensingh in the Mymensingh cinema bombings.
