= Murder of A. F. M. Rezaul Karim Siddique =

Murder of a professor in Bangladesh

- Siddique
- Location: Shalbagan, Rajshahi, Bangladesh
- Date: 23 April 2016
- Attack type: Stabbing
- Weapon: Machetes
- Deaths: 1
- Victim: A. F. M. Rezaul Karim Siddique
- Perpetrators: Islamic State (self-claimed, denied by CTTC); Jamaat-ul-Mujahideen Bangladesh
- Accused: 8
- Charges: Murder
- Verdict: Guilty
- Convicted: 5 (2 death sentences, 3 life imprisonments)
- Judge: Shirin Kabita Akhter

A. F. M. Rezaul Karim Siddique (or Siddiquee) (7 January 1955 – 23 April 2016) was a professor of English at Rajshahi University, Bangladesh. He died in an attack suspected to have been carried out by Islamist militants that has been linked by commentators to a wave of attacks on secularists in Bangladesh.

== Murder ==
Siddique was killed on 23 April 2016 in the Shalbagan area of Rajshahi when he was attacked by unidentified assailants armed with machetes while he was on his way to work. His attackers are suspected to be Islamist militants. He was 61 years old. His son, Riyasat Imtiaz Sourav, said "My father had no personal enemy". ISIL claimed that it carried out the attack, however, this was denied by the Bangladeshi authorities who say that ISIL does not exist in Bangladesh.

=== Reaction ===
The students and teachers of Rajshahi University organized continuous protests to demand justice for Siddique's murder. On 2 May 2016 all the teachers from public universities across the country held a three-hour work stoppage in support of the demands.

=== Trial ===
On 8 May 2018, Justice Shirin Kabita Akhter of the Speedy Trial Tribunal in Rajshahi sentenced two to death for the murder of A. F. M. Rezaul Karim Siddique; both of them are members of Jama’atul Mujahideen Bangladesh. One of the convict, Shariful Islam, is a student of the University of Rajshahi and other convict was Maskawat Hasan. Three other accused were sentenced to life imprisonment. Shariful Islam remains a fugitive.

== Biography ==
Siddique was born in Bagmara Upazila, Rajshahi, in 1955. He received his advanced education at Rajshahi University from where he received degrees in 1976 and 1977. Siddique lectured at Faridpur Government Rajendra College from 1981 to 1983, after which he joined the department of English at Rajshahi University. He was awarded his PhD there in 2000. Siddique was the chairman of the English department from 2001 to 2004 and became a professor in 2006. Outside the university, he founded the cultural organisations Arony Sangskritik Sangsad and Kamal Gandhar, and set up a music school at Bagmara. He was the founding editor of the literary magazine Kamal Gandhar.

Siddique was married to Hosne Ara Sheera and had a son Riyasat Imtiaz Sourav and daughter Rizwana Hasin Shotovi, all of whom survived him.

== See also ==
- Attacks on secularists in Bangladesh
- Murder of S Taher Ahmed
- Mohammad Yunus (academic)
- Murder of A. K. M. Shafiul Islam
- Murder of Asma Sadia Runa
