= Manik Chandra Saha =

Bangladeshi journalist and Ekushey Padak recipient

- মানিক চন্দ্র সাহা
- Born: 1956
- Died: 15 January 2004 (aged 48)
- Occupation: Journalist
- Political party: Bangladesh Awami League
- Awards: Ekushey Padak (2009, posthumous)

Manik Chandra Saha (1956 – 15 January 2004) was a Bangladeshi journalist. He was awarded Ekushey Padak, second highest civilian award of Bangladesh, in 2009 by the Government of Bangladesh.

== Early life ==
Saha was born in 1956 in Narail District, East Pakistan, Pakistan.

== Career ==
Saha became a journalist in 1984. He joined the BBC Bangla service as a stringer in 1994. In 2000, he was the Khulna Division correspondent of Ekushey Television.

Saha was the Khulna correspondent of the Daily New Age and a stringer of BBC Bangla. He was a staff correspondent of the Daily Sangbad. He is a former president of the Khulna Press Club. He was a member of the Khulna District Bar Association. He was the vice-chairman of the Khulna South Herald School. He was the president of Khulna unit of Amnesty International.

== Death and legacy ==
Saha had fears about his safety and had sought safety from Bazlur Rahman, editor of Sangbad. Saha attended a program of the Khulna City unit of Awami League after which he headed to the Khulna Press Club. Saha was killed in an explosion after a bomb was thrown at him in front of Khulna Press Club in Khulna. Prime Minister Khaleda Zia expressed her condolences. Former Prime Minister and leader of the opposition, Sheikh Hasina, condemned his assassination. His colleague, Humayun Kabir Balu, who was protesting his death was assassinated five months later by the Purbo Banglar Communist Party. He was awarded the Ekushey Padak in 2009.

On 1 December 2016, nine individuals were sentenced to life imprisonment for the murder of Saha. Of the 14 accused in the murder case, two were acquitted and three were killed in shootouts with law enforcement agencies. The family expressed dissatisfaction with the verdict as they had hoped for the death penalty and were unhappy about the financiers of the attack not being identified in court.
