= Gono Mukti Fouz =

Far-left militant organization in Bangladesh

People's Liberation Army
- গণমুক্তি ফৌজ
- Other name: GMF
- Chief: Aminul Mukul (POW)
- Second-in-command: Fazlul Haq †
- Founded: c. 2005; 21 years ago
- Dates active: 2005–2020
- Country: Bangladesh
- Ideology: Maoism
- Political position: Far-left
- Status: Inactive
- Wars: Maoist insurgency in Bangladesh

Gono Mukti Fouz (Bengali: গণমুক্তি ফৌজ, lit. 'People's Liberation Army') was a far-left militant group in Bangladesh. The organization is similar in ideology to other left-wing armed groups like Biplobi Communist Party, Purba Banglar Sarbahara Party, Purbo Banglar Communist Party (Janajuddho), and Purbo Banglar Communist Party. The group is most active in South-Western Districts of Bangladesh.

Gono Mukti Fouz has received patronage from leaders of different political parties in Kushtia. According to a leader of Gono Mukti Fouz patrons include Kushtia District Awami League unit Vice President Haji Rabiul and General Secretary Azgor Ali. South Asian Terrorism Portal has described the outfit as an "Inactive Terrorist/Insurgent Groups".

== History ==
In April 2005, an activist of Gono Mukti Fouz, Jahid Master, was arrested by Bangladesh Police from Comilla District and taken to Kushtia District. While taking him to a location to recover weapons, Rapid Action Battalion unit were attacked. In the ensuing gunfight Jahid Master and another member of Gono Mukti Fouz were killed.

On 17 March 2009, Gono Mukti Fouz distributed flyers and published a list of people it was going to kill in Kushtia District. On 27 July 2010, two activists of Gono Mukti Fouz, including one former Leader of Bangladesh Mohila Awami League, were sentenced to life imprisonment for smuggling weapons.

Gono Mukti Fouz chief Aminul Islam Mukul was detained in India in 2010 for immigration fraud and sentenced to years imprisonment. On 1 June 2013, Rapid Action Battalion arrested his wife Sahida Khatun.

On 26 June 2013, Gono Mukti Fouz tried to kidnap someone from Biharia village. Hearing the commotion the villagers gathered around the house which prompted the Fouz to shoot at the villagers killing two. The Second in Command of Gono Mukti Fouz, Fazlul Haq alias Fazlu Matbor, was killed in a gunfight with Rapid Action Battalion in Kushtia on 22 September 2013.

On 11 February 2016, two activists were killed in a gunfight with Rapid Action Battalion. On 11 November 2016, two leaders of Gono Mukti Fouz were killed in a gunfight with Rapid Action Battalion.

On 28 December 2020, a leader of Gono Mukti Fouz was arrested by Rapid Action Battalion from Kushtia District.
