= Allah'r Dal =

Islamic militant group in Bangladesh

Allah'r Dal/Allah'r Sarkar
- আল্লাহর দল/আল্লাহর সরকার
- Jihadist flag
- Other name: Allah'r Sarkar (God's Government)
- Founder: Abdul Motin Mehdi
- Leaders: Sheikh Kamal (arrested) and several others
- Dates active: 1995-present
- Country: Bangladesh
- Ideology: Islamism; Islamic fundamentalism
- Status: Active
- Part of: Jamaat-ul-Mujahideen Bangladesh

Allah'r Dal (Bengali: আল্লাহর দল, lit. 'God's Group') is an Islamist militant organisation operating in Bangladesh. The group also operates under the name Allah'r Sarkar (Bengali: আল্লাহর সরকার, lit. 'God's Government'). Bangladesh Enterprise Institute in their 2007–2008 Trends in Militancy in Bangladesh report referred to the group as an offshoot of Jamaat-ul-Mujahideen Bangladesh. According to the report the group is most active in Kushtia District, Meherpur District, and Chuadanga District.

== History ==
Allah'r Dal was established in 1995 by Abdul Motin Mehdi. He was arrested and later sentenced to death for his involvement in the 2005 Bangladesh bombings. It had merged with Jama'atul Mujahideen Bangladesh in the late 2004.

On 30 September 2007, four members of the outfit were detained by Rapid Action Battalion from Rangpur District and Nilphamari District. On 25 May 2008, 13 members of the outfit were detained in Gaibandha District. The police were tipped off by locals. The Ministry of Home Affairs blacklisted Allah'r Dal in 2009.

On 31 March 2013, Detective Branch of Bangladesh police arrested four Pakistani nationals with bomb making equipments and 6.3 million fake Indian rupees. In the same police the team also arrested 12 individuals from Islami Chhatra Shibir, Harkat-ul-Jihad-al-Islami Bangladesh, Harkatul Mujahideen, and Allah'r Dal. The raids started after the arrest of President of Madaripur District unit of Bangladesh Jamaat-e-Islami, Dr Farid Uddin Ahammad.

On 4 October 2018, Bangladesh Police arrested four members of the outfit with bomb making equipment from Meherpur District.

On 19 August 2019, Rapid Action Battalion arrested four members of Allah'r Dal from Hatirjheel area of Dhaka. Allah'r Dal was banned by the government of Bangladesh on 6 November 2019 through an announcement of Public Security Division of the Ministry of Home Affairs. On 13 December 2019, four members of the outfit were arrested by Anti-terrorism Unit of Bangladesh Police from Khulna.

On 11 December 2019, Rapid Action Battalion arrested the Meherpur District unit head of Allah'r Dal. A member of the outfit was arrested from Gangni Upazila in Meherpur District by Rapid Action Battalion in February 2020. On 30 January 2020, nine members were arrested from Sylhet by Bangladesh Police.

On 4 January 2021, Anti-terrorism Unit of Bangladesh Police arrested the second in command and acting leader of Allah'r Dal, Sheikh Kamal, along with four other members of the group. The detainees claimed that the organisation has more than 25 thousand members. On 30 January 2021, two more members were arrested from Palashbari Upazila in Gaibandha District by Rapid Action Battalion.

== Ideology ==
They believe in establishing an Islamic government in Bangladesh. They tend to not pray behind an Imam and have some disagreements with the last prophets name in the Shahada.

== See also ==
- Towhidi Muslim Janata
