= November 2005 Bangladesh court bombing =

Terrorist incident in Bangladesh

- Location: Gazipur and Chittagong, Bangladesh
- Date: 29 November 2005 (UTC+06:00)
- Target: Bangladesh Judiciary
- Attack type: Mass murder; bomb attack; Suicide bomber; Terrorism
- Deaths: 8
- Injuries: 100
- Perpetrator: Jamaat-ul-Mujahideen Bangladesh

The November 2005 Bangladesh court bombing was a simultaneous suicide bombing of courts in Chittagong and Gazipur in Bangladesh carried out by Jamaat-ul-Mujahideen Bangladesh on 29 November 2005 that killed 8 people and injured over 100.

== Attacks ==
Jamaat-ul-Mujahideen Bangladesh had called for the abolition of secular laws and replacing them with Sharia law. They carried out a number of attacks in 2005 targeting the Judiciary. On 29 November 2005, a suicide bomber attacked the Gazipur Bar Association office on the ground floor of the Hall Building-2 in the Gazipur courthouse complex. The explosion killed 8 people, 3 of whom were lawyers, and injured 50 lawyers. The bomber had entered the complex wearing lawyers robes to disguise themselves. The same day and around the same time in Chittagong court building two police officers were killed while the bomber survived. In the explosion 16 people were injured including 13 police officers.

== Trial ==
A Gazipur court framed charges against the accused in the Gazipur court blast on 24 April 2011. On 20 June 2013, Speedy Trial Tribunal-4 of Dhaka sentenced 10 accused in the Gazipur court bombing to death. On 28 July 2016 Bangladesh High court confirmed the death sentences of 6 convicts, commuted 2 to life sentences, and cleared two of all charges.

== Reactions ==
Bangladesh Supreme Court bar association called a strike after the bombings, demanding that security be upgraded.
