= Jasimuddin Rahmani =

Bangladeshi Al Qaeda militant

- মুফতি জসিমউদ্দিন রহমানী
- Alma mater: Jamia Qurania Arabia Lalbagh, Darul Uloom Deoband
- Military career
- Allegiance: Al Qaeda
- Branch: Ansarullah Bangla Team
- Rank: Emir
- Other work: Unmuktu Tarabari

Muhammad Jasimuddin Rahmani (Bengali: মোহাম্মদ জসিমুদ্দিন রহমানি) is a Deobandi jihadist Islamic scholar and Mufti from Bangladesh. He was the imam of Hatembagh Jame Masjid in Dhaka, Bangladesh. Jasimusdun Rahmani, a Jihadist, is the chief of an Al-Qaeda affiliated militia organisation, Ansarullah Bangla Team. He was in custody in Bangladesh, charged under the Anti-Terrorism Act. He supported the murder of atheist bloggers.

== Early life ==
Rahmani was the Imam of Hatembagh Jame Masjid in Dhaka, Bangladesh. He studied in madrasas in Bangladesh and outside the country. He was inspired by Al-Qaeda leader Anwar al-Awlaki.

== Career ==
Rahmani used to operate a website called "Ansarullah Bangla Team" although he himself denied this claim in him recent youtube video, claiming that he currently has aligned completely with the senior scholars from Darul Ulum Deoband. The site and the militant group he headed were held responsible for the murder of several secular activists in Bangladesh. In one of his speeches, he stated "I was sent to jail for writing a book where I said, if you (Sheikh Hasina) can make rules for insulting your father, then why can't you make rules against those who mock Prophet Muhammad?" He had convinced three undercover law enforcement officers to desert and join his cause.

Bangladeshi law enforcement investigation placed Jasimuddin as the leader of Ansarullah Bangla Team. Rahmani was arrested on 12 August 2013 from Barguna, Bangladesh along with 30 members of his organisation for inciting people to commit violent jihad. He was sentenced to a five-year prison sentence.

During the Bangladesh Interim government, he was granted bail in all terrorism related cases, and released in August 2024. He had been in jail over the murder of Ahmed Rajib Haider. He attended and spoke at the rally in May 2025, calling for a ban on the Awami League. Ali Riaz called him part of the “fourth generation” of Islamist militants and follower of Anwar al-Awlaki in an academic paper.
