= Humayun Kabir Balu =

- Born: 4 October 1947; Itna village, Narail District, East Bengal, Pakistan
- Died: 27 June 2004 (aged 56); Khulna, Bangladesh
- Occupations: Journalist, politician
- Spouse(s): Late Akter Jahan Ruma (1976-1984), Late Ara Kabir (1986-2001)

Humayun Kabir Balu (4 October 1947 – 27 June 2004) was a Bangladeshi journalist. He was awarded Ekushey Padak in 2009 by the government of Bangladesh.

== Career ==
Balu was the editor of Dainik Janmbhumi. He was the president of Khulna Press Club in 1984, 1998 and 2003. He became the vice-president of Khulna Zonal Newspaper Editors' Association in 1990 and a member of Mongla Port Authority in 1998.

In 1976, Balu was elected publicity secretary of Khulna City Awami League. Balu was very active in politics before the independence of Bangladesh. He even went to jail for participating in liberation movement during the Pakistan rule in Bangladesh. He took active participation as a freedom fighter. He was the first person to hail the flag of newly born Bangladesh in the southern city of Khulna.

In 2004, Balu was killed in a bomb attack in front of his own house after coming from his mother's house while entering the house getting down from the car with his three children in Khulna City.

In 2020, five members of Purbo Banglar Communist Party were sentenced to life in prison for killing Balu.

== Awards ==
- President's Award (1992)
- Gold medal of Dr Ashraf Siddiqui Foundation (1993)
- Ekushey Padak (2009)
