= Mymensingh Central Jail =

Prison in Bangladesh

- Interactive map of Mymensingh Central Jail
- Location: Jail Road, Mymensingh, Mymensingh District, Mymensingh Division; 24.772605°N 90.383191°E
- Security class: Medium
- Opened: 1792
- Managed by: Bangladesh Jail
- Website: prison.mymensingh.gov.bd

Mymensingh Central Jail (Bengali: ময়মনসিংহ কেন্দ্রীয় কারাগার) is a central jail located in Mymensingh, Bangladesh.

== History ==
Mymensingh jail was established as a district jail in 1792. Later in 1997, it was upgraded as a Central Jail. WA Chowdhury served as the first Jail Superintendent of Bangladesh in Mymensingh Central Jail. Sherpur, Jamalpur, Kishoreganj, Netrokona and Tangail were the sub-jails under this jail. In the early 1800s, this prison was used to house female prisoners. In 1339 Bengali year, a cyclone damaged the tin shed building of the inmate ward of the then prison. In fact, 200 prisoners died in the cyclone.

== Infrastructure and capacity ==
Mymensingh Central Jail was established on 68 acres of land. Out of this, 59.60 acres are inside the perimeter and 8.40 acres outside. Although the prison has an inmate capacity of 996, it houses more than twice its average capacity. As the prison buildings are old and dilapidated, the Ministry of Home Affairs started a project named expansion and modernization of Mymensingh Jail in 2016 with an allocation of Tk 117 crore. As the project work could not be completed within the stipulated time due to various reasons including Corona, it was proposed to increase the cost allocation to more than 200 crores. As a result the duration of the project was extended till June 2022. The project includes construction of two six-storey prison buildings, a 100-bed hospital for male prisoners, separate buildings for female and juvenile prisoners, a multi-storey building for prison guards and a boundary wall.

== Notable inmates ==
- Tajuddin Ahmad
