= Jurvarongpara =

Jurvarongpara জুরভারং পাড়া
- Location in Bangladesh
- Coordinates: 22°06′49.716″N 92°24′14.976″E
- Country: Bangladesh
- Division: Chittagong Division
- District: Bandarban District
- Elevation: 203 m (665 ft)
- Time zone: UTC+6 (Bangladesh Time)

Jurvarongpara alternatively Jurvarong Para (Bengali: জুরভারং পাড়া) is a hilly village of Bandarban District in the Chittagong Division of southeastern Bangladesh. It is situated in high hill with an average elevation of 665 feet.

== Details ==
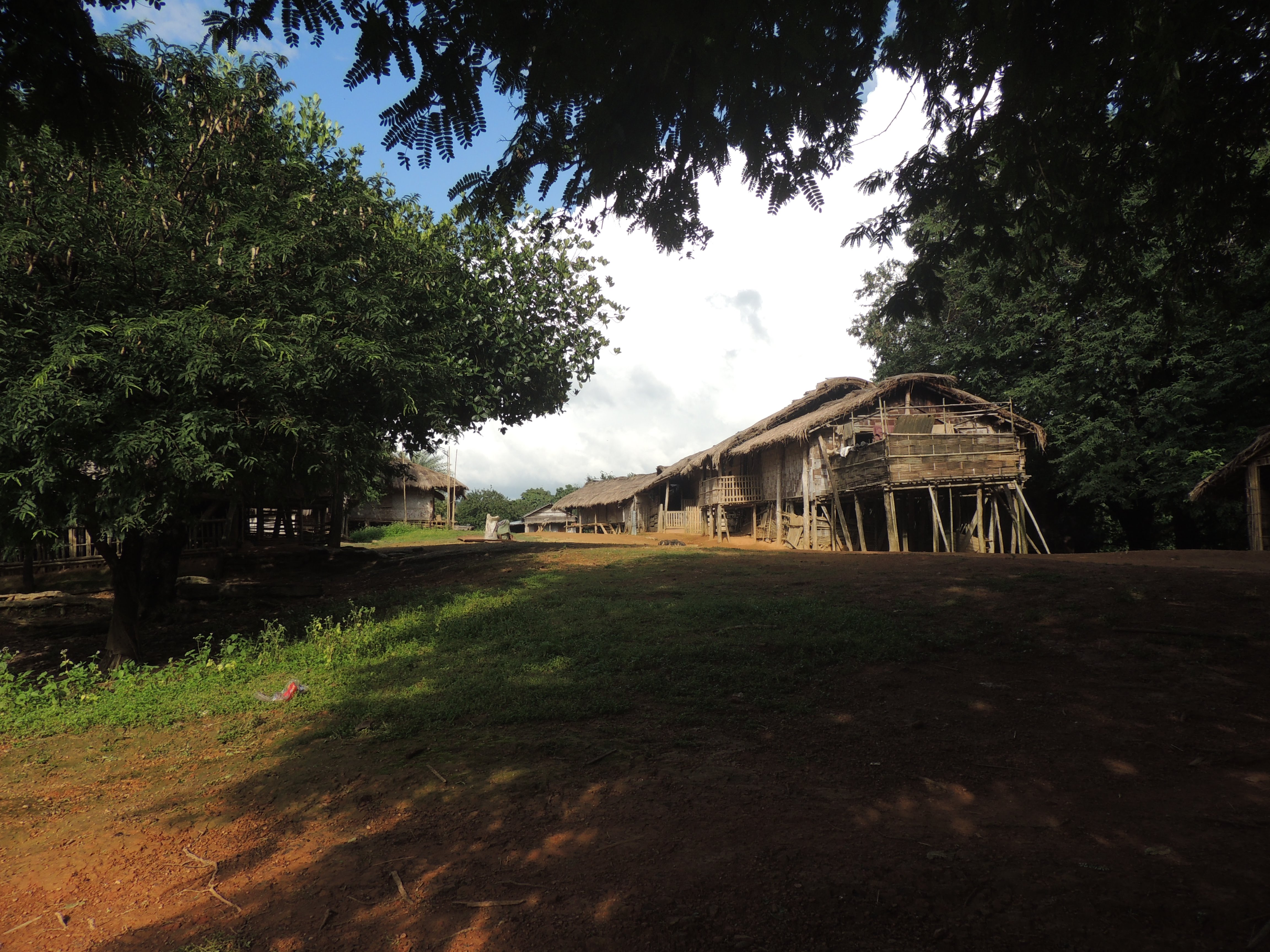
Jurvarongpara – a remote hilly village in Bandarban

The village is in Ruma Upazila, under Paindu Union #1, Ward #4, 252 Khomongkhyang mauja. The village head (locally known as Karbari) is Rownem Bawm. It is a Bawm settlement that means the inhabitants are largely Bawm. All the locals are Christian. There are two churches in this village: Jurvarongpara Church, Jurvarongpara ECG Church. The village has a small stream flowing past it, which is the primary source of their fresh water. Like any other hilly village, people there mostly live on hilly agriculture, locally known as jum chaash.
