= Ansarullah Bangla Team =

Jihadist organisation in Bangladesh

- আনসারুল্লাহ বাংলা টিম
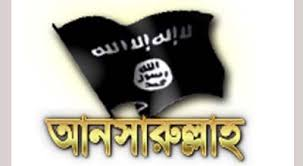
- Banner of Ansarullah Bangla Team
- Leader: Jasimuddin Rahmani
- Spokesperson: Shaikh Tamim Al-Adnani
- Dates active: 2013 - present
- Allegiance: Al-Qaeda; HuJI-B
- Active regions: Indian subcontinent
- Ideology: Jihadism; Qutbism; Pan-islamism; Anti-Communism; Anti-Secularism; Anti-Hindu sentiment
- Political position: Far-right
- Status: Active
- Size: unknown

The Ansarullah Bangla Team (ABT) (Bengali: আনসারুল্লাহ বাংলা টিম), also known as Ansar-al Islam Bangladesh or Ansar Bangla, is a militant Islamist organization in Bangladesh, implicated in many terrorist activities targeting civilians, including attacks and murders of atheist bloggers from 2013 to 2015. Bangladesh Police arrested one member of Ansarullah Bangla Team for connection with Ashulia bank robbery.

== History ==
A new report in 2013 identified Muhammad Jasimuddin Rahmani as the spiritual leader of a militant group in Bangladesh. He was inspired by Anwar al-Awlaki, who had been killed by the US. He was suspected of building an Islamist terror network in Bangladesh for about minimum 5 years. Muhammad Jasimuddin Rahmani was the Imam of Hatembagh mosque, Dhanmondi. Many of its supporters online are also supporters of Bangladesh Islami Chhatra Shibir and Bangladesh Jamaat-e-Islami.

On December 17 and 18, 2024, the Special Task Force (STF), a special branch of the Assam Police, arrested 8 members of the Ansarullah Bangla Team from various places in West Bengal, Kerala and Assam.

== Militant activity ==
=== Murders ===
The ABT claimed responsibility for some of the prominent murders and attacks of atheist bloggers, including Ahmed Rajib Haider, Asif Mohiuddin, Avijit Roy, Oyasiqur Rahman, Ananta Bijoy Das and AKM Shafiul Islam.

On 21 November 2022, two of the men sentenced to death for the murder of Avijit Roy escaped from a courtroom in Dhaka, assisted by men on motorbikes armed with chemical sprays.

=== Ashulia bank robbery ===
The ABT was implicated in a bank robbery of a branch of the Bangladesh Commerce Bank Limited in Ashulia of Savar on April 21, 2015. The robbery started at 3 pm, when 8-10 people entered the bank brandishing guns. According to witness reports, they tried to take Tk. 5 lakhs (US$6,400 as of June 2015) while holding bank officials hostage at gunpoint. However, as some of the officials obstructed the robbers, they were stabbed, injuring 5 of which 3 succumbed to their injuries in medical care:

- a bank manager,
- a security officer and
- a bank customer.

However, at that point, locals outside quickly used a nearby mosque with loudspeakers to announce the bank robbery. The robbers heard the announcements and started violently fleeing the area, using several rounds of shots, hurling molotov cocktails and grenades. This sudden outburst injured some 20 people; 3 of whom died immediately after hospital admission, 2 later while receiving treatment at around 8:30 pm and one more person on the next night.

The robbers divided and fled the scene, some on foot and some on motorcycles. A mob quickly formed and caught 2 robbers on one bike and another robber in another area. In a mass beating of the two caught, the mob killed one and hospitalised the other – who later succumbed to his injuries. The police attempted to recover the robbers but this led to a clash and two police vehicles being vandalised. Arrival of police backup put the situation under control and the robbers captured.

A total of 9 people were either killed immediately or succumbed to injuries sustained, and at least 14 others were at most injured by bullet-wounds from weapons used by the robbers. Interrogation of the captured robber(s) led to the arrest of more suspects; police found that several of the robbers were members of the ABT.

== Arrests ==
The following arrests were made of speculated or confirmed ABT members as of 1 June 2015.

1. Asif Mohiuddin's attempted murder (13 January 2013 attack) – 1 April 2013 arrests.
  - Saad-al-Nahin – 24, student
  - Kawsar Ahmed – 23, hawker
  - Kamal Uddin – 23, carpenter
  - Kamal Hossain – 28, bank security guard
2. Ahmed Rajib Haider's murder (15 February 2013 attack) – 2 March 2013 arrests of five North South University students
  - Redwanul Azad Rana, 32
  - Faisal bin Nayeem (alias Dwip), 24
  - Maksudul Hassan Anik, 25
  - Ehsan Reza Rumman, 25
  - Naim Sikder Irad, 21
  - Nafis Imtiaz, 24
3. ABT arrests – 12 August 2013
  - Mufti Jasim Uddin Rahmani – Suspected chief of the ABT
  - 30 others
4. Ashulia bank robbery – 21 April 2015
  - Al Amin Hossain (21 April 2015 arrest) – A robber caught by the locals
  - Mahfuzul Islam Shamim (30 April 2015 arrest) – The 'operation commander' of the Ashulia bank robbery, an ex-member of the banned Jama'atul Mujahideen Bangladesh and confessor of crimes including robbery and murder of a bKash vendor on 10 March 2015
  - Two others killed as a result of mass beating by a mob
5. Secret meeting attendees at Dhaka – 13 June 2016
  - Md Mozahidul Islam – responsible for recruiting and inviting new members into (ABT), arrested via Detective Branch on a crackdown
  - Md Ariful Islam Solaiman alias Arafat – responsible for recruiting and inviting new members into (ABT), arrested via Detective Branch on a crackdown
6. Assam Police preliminary investigation tip-off - 24 April 2023
  - Muhammad Shafiqul Islam
  - Muhammad Mojahidul Mandol
  - Muhammad Badshah Sheikh

== Sentences ==
In December 2015 several members of ABT were sentenced for the murder of activist Ahmed Rajib Haider, including:

- Faisal bin Nayem alias Dweep - sentenced to death
- Rezwanul Azad Rana - sentenced to death in absentia
- Jasim Uddin Rahmani - 5 years imprisonment, Taka 2,000 fine
- Maksudul Hasan - life imprisonment in absentia

== Ban ==
- (Bangladesh) The outfit was planned to be banned in 2013 alongside 9 others but the ban on the ABT was not enacted at the time. After a police request for a ban following an investigation report of the bank heist two years later, the Ministry of Home Affairs officially banned them on 25 May 2015.
