= Md. Ali Hossain Fakir =

Bangladeshi Inspector General of Police since 2026

- আলী হোসেন ফকির
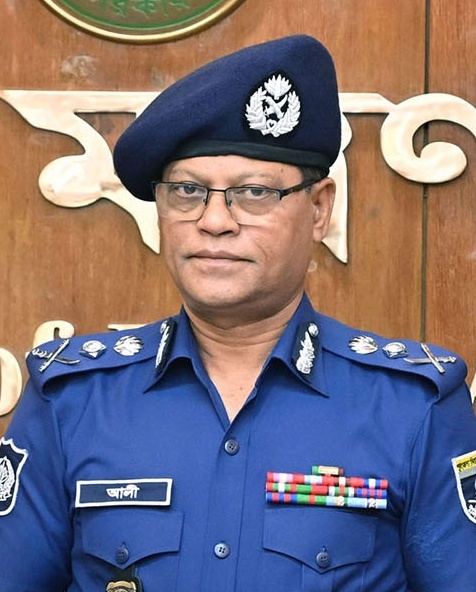
- Ali in 2026

Inspector General of Bangladesh Police
- Incumbent
- Assumed office 24 February 2026
- President: Mohammed Shahabuddin; Hafiz Uddin Ahmad (acting); Mirza Fakhrul Islam Alamgir
- Prime Minister: Tarique Rahman
- Preceded by: Baharul Alam

Personal details
- Born: 5 April 1968 (age 58) Bagerhat, East Pakistan
- Education: University of Dhaka (BA, MA)
- Awards: Bangladesh Police Medal (Bravery) – BPM
- Police career
- Allegiance: Bangladesh
- Branch: Bangladesh Police
- Service years: 1995-present
- Status: Active
- Rank: IGP

Md. Ali Hossain Fakir (born 5 April 1968) is a Bangladeshi police officer who has been serving as the inspector general of police (IGP) of the Bangladesh Police since 24 February 2026. He was appointed to the post by the government of Bangladesh, replacing Baharul Alam.

== Early life and education ==
Fakir was born on 5 April 1968 in Bagerhat District in what is now Bangladesh. He is a member of the 15th batch of the Bangladesh Civil Service (police) cadre. He completed his BA and MA in management at the University of Dhaka.

== Career ==
Fakir joined the Bangladesh Police in 1995 after passing the Bangladesh Civil Service (BCS) examination in the police cadre. Over his career, he served in various positions, including postings at the Dhaka Metropolitan Police (DMP) and as superintendent of police (SP) in multiple districts. Before becoming IGP, he was serving as additional inspector general of police (additional IGP) and chief of the Armed Police Battalion (APBn).

He has also participated in United Nations peacekeeping missions and travelled abroad for professional training and official visits.

=== Appointment as inspector general ===
On 24 February 2026, the Ministry of Home Affairs issued an official notification announcing that Md Ali Hossain Fakir had been promoted and appointed the inspector general of police, the highest post in the Bangladesh Police.
