= Ashkona =

Ashkona is a neighborhood in Dakkhinkhan, Dhaka, the capital of Bangladesh.

== History ==
In 2008 International khatme-nabuwat movement tried to take over the Ahmadiyya mosque in Ashkona. In 2017 the headquarters of Rapid Action Battalion was attacked by a suicide bomber. Islamic State claimed responsibility of the attack.

== Establishments ==
- Ashkona Hajj camp is a residence facility for Hajj pilgrims near Shahjalal International airport.
- Imam Training Academy.
