= 2005 Bangladesh bombings =

Islamist terror attacks throughout Bangladesh

- Location: Across Bangladesh (excluding Munshiganj)
- Date: 17 August 2005; 11:00 (UTC+06:00)
- Target: Bangladesh
- Attack type: Terrorist attack
- Weapon: About 500 bombs
- Deaths: 2
- Injuries: 115+
- Perpetrators: Jamaat-ul-Mujahideen Bangladesh; Harkat-ul-Jihad al-Islami

On 17 August 2005, around 500 bomb explosions occurred at 300 locations in 63 of the 64 districts of Bangladesh. The bombs exploded within a half-hour period, starting at 11:00 am. A terrorist organization, Jama'atul Mujahideen Bangladesh (JMB), claimed responsibility for the bombings. The group was led by Shaykh Abdur Rahman and Siddique ul-Islam (also known as Bangla Bhai). Another terrorist group, named Harkat-ul-Jihad al-Islami, was associated with JMB in executing the co-ordinated attack. Following the bombings, both groups were banned by the BNP government of Bangladesh.

== Attacks ==
The bombs detonated within a half-hour period, starting at 11:00 am. They exploded near government facilities. In Dhaka, they exploded near the Bangladesh Secretariat, the Supreme Court Complex, the Prime Minister's Office, the Dhaka University campus, the Dhaka Sheraton Hotel, and Zia International Airport. At least 115 people were injured when 500 small bombs were exploded in 63 out of 64 districts of Bangladesh. The explosions killed two people (a child in Savar, near Dhaka, and a rickshaw-puller in Chapai Nawabganj District) and injured a further 50.

== Victims ==
- Rickshaw driver Rabiul Islam was injured when seven bombs exploded at about 11:10 am at Biswa Road crossing near Shah Neamatullah College in the Nawabganj. He died on the way to Rajshahi Medical College Hospital.
- Schoolboy Abdus Salam, who was 10, was injured when a bomb exploded outside his house in Savar. He died in the hospital.

== Trials ==
The main perpetrators of the bombing, Bangla Bhai and Shaykh Abdur Rahman, were arrested by the police and the Rapid Action Battalion in early March 2006 during the BNP-led government. They were convicted for their involvement in the November 2005 suicide bombing that killed two judges, were sentenced to death, and were executed by hanging on 29 March 2007.

Five suspects were sentenced to death and one to 20 years in prison for their part in the bomb attacks in Bogra. By 2013, 200 cases out of 273 cases filed in connection with 2005 Bangladesh bombings have been disposed of. Different courts have sentenced 58 people to death; 150 were sentenced to life in prison and 300 others were sentenced to various terms in prisons.

== Reactions ==
- Motiur Rahman Nizami, the then industry minister, from Jamaat-e-Islami blamed India for the blast.
- Moudud Ahmed, the then law minister, from Bangladesh Nationalist Party said "If they try for 100 years, they will not turn Bangladesh into a Taliban state,".
- The then chief cleric Ubaidul Haq remarked to thousands of worshippers at Baitul Mukarram Mosque, "Islam prohibits suicide bombings. These bombers are enemies of Islam. It is a duty for all Muslims to stand up against those who are killing people in the name of Islam."

== See also ==
- List of attacks on high courts
