= Bangla Bhai =

Bangladeshi terrorist (1970–2007)

- Bangla Bhai
- Born: Siddique ul-Islam; 1970; Rajshahi, Bangladesh
- Died: 30 March 2007 (aged 36–37); Mymensingh Central Jail, Mymensingh, Bangladesh
- Cause of death: Decapitation due to a botched execution by hanging
- Other name: Azizur Rahman
- Years active: 2004–2007
- Employer: Shaykh Abdur Rahman
- Organization: Jamaat-ul-Mujahideen Bangladesh
- Known for: 2005 Bangladesh bombings
- Political party: Islami Chhatra Shibir (c. 1980s–1995); Chhatra League (c. before 1980s)
- Spouse: Fahima
- Children: 1
- Status: Executed
- Penalty: Death
- Reward amount: ৳5,000,000 (c. US$42,000 in 2025)
- Wanted by: Government of Bangladesh

Details
- Victims: 500+

Siddique ul-Islam (Bengali: সিদ্দিকুল ইসলাম, romanized: Siddikul Islam), known popularly as Azizur Rahman (Bengali: আজিজুর রহমান, romanized: Ajijoor Rohoman, lit. 'Dear to the Most Merciful' in Arabic) or Bangla Bhai (Bengali: বাংলা ভাই, lit. 'Bangla Brother') (1970 – 30 March 2007), was a Bangladeshi Radical Extremist and terrorist. and the military commander of the Al Qaeda affiliated radical Islamist terrorist organization Jagrata Muslim Janata Bangladesh (lit. 'Awakened Muslim Masses of Bangladesh'), known in popular usage as the JMJB. Most active in the north-western section of Bangladesh around the Rajshahi region, Bangla Bhai gained nationwide and worldwide notoriety for bombings and other terrorist activities.

== Biography ==
His father was Nazir Hossain Pramanik of Kannipara village in Gabtali Upazila in Bogra. He claimed to have graduated from Rajshahi University in 1995 with a master's in Bangla. The Daily Star reporter contacted the university to verify his claims. The university claimed there was no student named Azizur Rahman at the Bangla Department in 1995. When The Daily Star reported pointed out this contradiction Bangla Bhai replied: "I studied Bangla at Azizul Haq University College affiliated with Rajshahi University. Bangla Bhai remained private and guarded about his education and background. His senior officer in the organization Amir Maulana Abdur Rahman who was also present during the interview reported that Bangla Bhai studied at Tarafsartaj Senior Fazil Madrasa. Bangla Bhai said regarding his alias "I was a Bangla teacher at two top coaching centres in Dhaka. As my students did well in Bangla, the authorities of coaching centres called me Bangla Bhai, "he did not name the coaching centres or their exact locations. Bangla Bhai also denied certain reports that he was aligned with Bangladesh Chhatra League. "I supported it when I was in school. As a college student, I joined Islami Chhatra Shibir (an Islamist student organisation allied with Jamaat-e-Islami). When I finished my study in 1995, I quit Shibir because Jamaat accepted female leadership although it said it considered female leadership sacrilege." He joined JMJB (Jagrata Muslim Janata Bangladesh) and rose to the rank of administrator of military affairs and an acting member of the Majlis-e-Sura, its main decision making board of trustees. Bangla Bhai became notorious for the torment and intimidation of the rivals of JMJB and minorities. On 17 August 2005, JMJB, under Siddique's administration, dispatched a nationwide assault by blasting 500 bombs. Alongside Shaykh Abdur Rahman, Siddique is affirmed to have engineered the bombings. In late 2005, a progression of suicide bomb assaults shook Bangladesh. JMJB and Jamaat-ul-Mujahideen Bangladesh have asserted obligation for these assaults.

== Militant activity ==
- He started operations in the northern Rajshahi locale in 2004 by crusading against neighborhood crooks, purportedly with the assistance of the police and some administration authorities.
- Taskforce against Torture is a Bangladeshi human rights organization which was founded in 2002. It has recorded more than 500 instances of individuals being threatened and tortured by Bangla Bhai and his associates.
- Abdur Rahman and Bangla Bhai set up organisational bases and militant training camps in madrasas and in remote areas of the country, mostly in the dense forests and hilly areas. They translated their plan into action with the help of huge funds from foreign countries that were meant for building mosques and madrasas.
- August 2005, estimated 500 bombs were detonated in almost every district of Bangladesh except one within one hour. The explosions caused the death of three individuals and injured about 100 individuals.
- In mid-November 2005, two Judges were killed when a bomb was tossed at their vehicle in the town of Jhalalkati, 120 km (75 miles) south of the capital, Dhaka.
- 29 November 2005-Seven individuals, including the suspected suicide bomber, died in the attack on Gazipur. This was the first Suicide bomb attack in Bangladesh's History. In Chittagong, two police officers were slain the suspected bomber was injured and immobilized. At slightest 16 individuals, 13 of them police officers were injured in Chittagong notwithstanding those murdered.

== Arrest ==
The Government of Bangladesh broadcast a ৳5,000,000 reward for the catch of Bangla Bhai or information about his whereabouts, which would supposedly lead to his capture. The Rapid Action Battalion intelligence unit and RAB-9 raced to Mymensingh in the early hours of 6 March 2006 and caught Bangla Bhai's wife Fahima and minor child Saad from a house on Ram Krishna Mission Road in Mymensingh town at around 5:00 a.m.. Acting on information obtained from his wife, the RAB men commanded by its intelligence wings head Lt Colonel Gulzar Uddin Ahmed encompassed the place of a town Doctor Umed Ali at Rampur in Muktagachha, 30 kilometers off Mymensingh, at around 7:00 a.m. and began looking for Bangla Bhai. As RAB Sergeant Rafiq, who was posted in a contiguous tin-roofed house, attempted to peep into the space to see who were inside, Bangla Bhai shot him once in the head. The RAB men were able to remove the sergeant to safety. Two or three minutes after Bangla Bhai assaulted Sergeant Rafiq, an effective bomb went off inside the tin-roofed room where Bangla Bhai was remaining. The blast wrecked the rooftop and an edge of the room caught fire. RAB asked him to surrender, and informed him he was surrounded.

Bangla Bhai exited the house at around 7:30 a.m. and surrendered. He showed signs of injury from the blast. Bangla Bhai's bodyguard Masud was discovered lying on the floor, he was badly injured from the blast. The entire house was smoldered and just the columns were remained. Injured RAB Sergeant Rafiq was airlifted to Combined Military Hospital (CMH) in Dhaka. RAB sources informed the journalists present that three cases would be filed against the terrorist- one under Arms Act, another under Explosives Substance Act and the third for striking the officers.

As the information of Bangla Bhai's catch spread, many individuals from close by towns raced to Rampur. The merry group remained on the housetops of houses, trees and both sides of the street as the injured Bangla Bhai was being taken to the hospital. In Mymensingh town, several individuals exited their homes, workplaces and shops to have a look of Bangla Bhai and continued applauding as the RAB men were taking him to the Mymensingh medical college and hospital in a security convoy.

== Trial and execution ==
Bangla Bhai was given death sentences for the killings of two assistant judges in Jhalokati. Bangla Bhai was hanged till death on 30 March 2007 in Mymensingh Central Jail, along with 5 other militants who were hanged in various jails, between the time periods of 11:45 p.m. and midnight BST. Bangla Bhai's hanging was bungled due to his weight being miscalculated and he was decapitated.

== Family ==
A Dhaka court on 10 August 2010 sentenced his wife (Fahima, pseudonym Farzana) and two JMB men (Salahuddin alias Saleheen and Asaduzzaman Chowdhury alias Panir) to 20 years' imprisonment each for having explosives. Judge Mohammad Rezaul Islam of the Speedy Trial Tribunal-4 passed on the sentence in vicinity of the convicts.
