= Shahadat-e al Hiqma =

- শাহাদাৎ-এ এল হিকমা
- Jihadist flag
- Founder: Kawsar Hossain Siddique (POW)
- Leader: Jakir Khandakar
- Founded: 8 February 2003
- Dates active: 2003-2011, 2014-Present
- Country: Bangladesh
- Headquarters: Bandarban, Chittagong, Bangladesh
- Active regions: Chittagong
- Ideology: Islamism; Islamic fundamentalism
- Status: Active
- Size: 35,000 (claimed by Kawsar Hossain Siddique)

Shahadat-e al Hiqma (Bengali: শাহাদাৎ-এ এল হিকমা, lit. 'Wisdom in Shahadat') is a banned Islamist terrorist organization in Bangladesh.

== History ==
Shahadat-e al Hiqma was established on 8 February 2003 by Sayed Kawsar Hossain Siddique. It is believed to be funded by Dawood Ibrahim. It announced that it would wage an armed struggle to establish an Islamic state in Bangladesh. Siddique claimed his group had 35 thousand "commandos" and "fighters". It was banned on 9 February 2003 by the Government of Bangladesh. Siddique was arrested on 9 November 2005.

In July 2011, Siddique was arrested from Rajshahi after Bangladesh Police "found" a three year old "missing" warrant in his name. Siddique was also a member of the Freedom Party. He has in the past referred to the Bangladesh Liberation war as "terrorist activity". He founded Himaloy Beverage Company which according to him is a 5 billion taka company. He was sent to jail on 28 July 2011.

The group was then allegedly reactivated by Jakir Khandakar in July 2014, who would then shift the headquarters to Bandarban District in Chittagong.

It was investigated by the National Investigation Agency of India for the 2014 Burdwan blast in West Bengal.
