= Biplobi Communist Party =

Maoist militant organization in Bangladesh

Revolutionary Communist Party
- বিপ্লবী কমিউনিস্ট পার্টি
- Other name: BCP
- Founder: Gazi Kamrul
- Founded: 1998; 28 years ago
- Dates active: 1998–2020
- Split from: PBCP
- Split to: New BCP
- Country: Bangladesh
- Ideology: Maoism
- Political position: Far-left
- Status: Inactive
- Wars: Maoist insurgency in Bangladesh

Biplobi Communist Party (Bengali: বিপ্লবী কমিউনিস্ট পার্টি, lit. 'Revolutionary Communist Party') is an inactive far-left, Maoist militant group in Bangladesh.

== History ==
Gazi Kamrul founded Biplobi Communist Party in 1998 after breaking away from Purbo Banglar Communist Party. He was detained from his residence, known as White House, by joint forces during Operation Clean Heart on 23 August 2002. Members of the outfit are used by mainstream politicians to intimidate their rivals.

On 20 November 2006, a leader of Biplobi Communist Party was killed in a shootout with Rapid Action Battalion in Jessore District. Sheikh Kamrul Islam of Biplobi Communist Party was detained on 23 September 2007 by Rapid Action Battalion with 14 firearms. Rapid Action Battalion raided a base of Biplobi Communist Party in Kushtia District on 15 December 2007 and detained two.

On 1 January 2008, Amirul Islam alias Rulu of Biplobi Communist Party was killed in a shootout with the police. Bangladesh Police detained 3 of the Biplobi Communist Party on 8 March 2008 from Kushtia. On 29 June 2008, a leader of Biplobi Communist Party was killed in a shootout with Bangladesh Police officers. On 20 August 2008, three insurgents of Biplobi Communist Party were detained from Jhenaidah District. A leader of Biplobi Communist Party was assassinated in April 2009 by Purbo Banglar Communist Party. Biplobi Communist Party was one of thirteen outlaw groups active on Khulna Division on 11 April 2009. On 28 March 2009, three leaders of Biplobi Communist Party were sentenced to life imprisonment in Tangail for killing a medicine trader in 2002. In October 2009, an activist of Biplobi Communist Party, Abu Sayeed Sarkar alias Ranga Sayeed, was killed in a shootout in Khulna.

In February 2010, Biplobi Communist Party shot and killed a leader of Purbo Banglar Communist Party in Chuadanga District. Mozam Sardar of Biplobi Communist Party was killed on 23 September 2010 Jhenaidah District in a shootout with Bangladesh Police and Rapid Action Battalion.

Rapid Action Battalion detained four members of Biplobi Communist Party with guns and bombs from Meherpur District on 5 February 2011. Rapid Action Battalion killed two members of the party in a shootout on 6 October 2011.

Shailendra Nath Biswas of Biplobi Communist Party was killed in a shootout with rivals in West Bengal, India on 31 January 2012.

On 2 January 2014, police detained a member of Biplobi Communist Party. Siraj Akonji of Biplobi Communist Party was killed in a gunfight with a fraction of the party on 16 July 2014.

On 4 September 2015, two activists of Biplobi Communist Party, who were suspected of being involved in the killing of the officer-in-charge of Pangsha Police Station Mizanur Rahman, were killed in a shootout with Bangladesh Police. officer-in-charge of Pangsha Police Station Abu Shama Iqbal Hayat was injured in the shootout.

On 19 December 2020, a leader of Biplobi Communist Party was shot dead in Khulna District.

== Factions ==
=== New Biplobi Communist Party ===
Dipankar Sarker of the New Biplobi Communist Party was killed in a gunfight with Bangladesh Police on 27 January 2006 in Khulna District.

Bikash Kumar Bose of the New Biplobi Communist Party was killed in a shootout with police in Kushtia District on 14 February 2009.

Both parties were active in Jhenaidah District in 2008. Imran Kabir, second in command of New Biplobi Communist Party, filed a petition for withdrawal of criminal cases against him with the Deputy Commissioner on 3 May 2009. Chief of the New Biplobi Communist Party, Akdil Hossain, was killed in a shootout with Bangladesh Police on 1 February 2010. Pratap Biswas and Shailen Biswas commanders of New Biplobi Communist Party were detained from Bagerhat District on 5 January 2010. Abdul Aziz, and Dipu Kumar Biswas of New Biplobi Communist Party were killed in a shootout with a different fraction of the party on 4 August 2010.

Shailendra Nath Biswas Shailan of New Biplobi Communist Party was killed in a shootout with Rapid Action Battalion on 4 November 2012 in Khulna. The death body of Akram Ali alias Bhadu Dakat of New Biplobi Communist Party in Khustia on 21 December 2014 with bullet wounds.

About 700 left-wing insurgents from New Biplobi Communist Party, Purbo Banglar Communist Party, and Purbo Banglar Sorbohara Party surrendered to Bangladesh Police in Pabna District on 2 April 2019.
