= Shaykh Abdur Rahman =

Former Bangladeshi terrorist

- শায়খ আব্দুর রহমান
- Died: 30 March 2007; Jhalakati, Barisal, Bangladesh
- Cause of death: Execution by hanging
- Other name: Abdur Rahman Shaykh
- Occupation: Administrative head of Jagrata Muslim Janata Bangladesh
- Years active: 2005-2006
- Organization: Jamaat-ul-Mujahideen Bangladesh: Jagrata Muslim Janata Bangladesh

Shaykh Abdur Rahman, also known as Abdur Rahman Shaykh, (died 30 March 2007) was the leader and the administrative head of the banned militant organization Jagrata Muslim Janata Bangladesh (Awakened Muslim Masses of Bangladesh).

== Biography ==
Abdur Rahman was educated in Islamic fiqh and law at Saudi Arabia. After being highly critical of the Jamaat-e-Islami Bangladesh for what he deemed as its patronization of secularism and sacrilege of Islamic values and principles, he soon formed the JMJB, taking initiatives to form an Islamic state based only upon his perception of the Qur'an and the Sunnah. However, the group soon gained notoriety because of its radical fundamentalist activities, including murder and torture of opponents.

== Militant activity ==
- On 17 August 2005, this group claimed responsibility for more than 500 bombings across Bangladesh. The government of Bangladesh banned the organization, and declared awards for the capture of Abdur Rahman.
- In late 2005, Abdur Rahman has been blamed for masterminding several more bomb attacks, including the first suicide bombing in Bangladesh.
- Abdur Rahman and Bangla Bhai set up organisational bases and militant training camps in madrasas and in remote areas of the country, mostly in the dense forests and hilly areas. They translated their plan into action with the help of huge funds from foreign countries that were meant for building mosques and madrasas.

== Capture ==
On 2 March 2006, Abdur Rahman was arrested in Shaplabagh, Sylhet by the Rapid Action Battalion.

== Death ==
JMB leaders Shaykh Abdur Rahman and Siddique ul-Islam alias Bangla Bhai had been given death sentences for the killings of two assistant judges in Jhalakathi. Along with five other militants, Shaykh Abdur Rahman was executed by hanging on 30 March 2007.

== Legacy ==
Dabiq', the official magazine of the Islamic State, has published an article titled "The Revival of Jihad in Bengal". In the article the magazine identified Shaykh Abdur Rahman as the founder of jihad in Bangladesh and asked its followers to carry on his legacy through jihad.
