= Purbo Banglar Communist Party =

Outlawed Communist Party in Bangladesh

Communist Party of East Bengal
- পূর্ব বাংলার কমিউনিস্ট পার্টি
- Other name: PBCP
- Founder: Abdul Matin-Alauddin Ahmed
- Leaders: Tipu Biswas, Islam Sabuj and others
- Dates active: 1968 – present
- Ideology: Communism; Maoism
- Political position: Far-left
- Status: Active, split into various hostile factions.

The Purbo Banglar Communist Party (Bengali: পূর্ব বাংলার কমিউনিস্ট পার্টি, lit. 'Communist Party of East Bengal', abbreviated: PBCP) is an outlawed communist party and militant far-left organization in Bangladesh. The PBCP formed in 1968 following a split in the Bangladesh Communist Party. It is mainly active in the areas of Khulna and Jessore in the south west of Bangladesh near the border of the Indian state of West Bengal where CPI-Maoist Naxalite insurgents have been active in an ongoing civil war against the Indian state. The PBCP suffers from violent rivalry both internally and externally with different party factions and rival splinter groups. The PBCP was criticized in 1972 by Siraj Sikder, the founder of the Purbo Bangla Sarbohara Party, as being neo-revisionist and a party that is "left in form but right in essence".

== History ==
During the Bangladesh Liberation War in 1971, it was led by Abdul Matin-Alauddin Ahmed and failed to make a significant impact on the war. Tipu Biswas was also a major leader of the party. After the independence of Bangladesh the party broke into multiple factions and followed the ideology of Charu Majumdar of India. The party started an insurgency against the government of Bangladesh.

In January 2004, the Janajuddha faction of the party killed two journalists in Khulna, Manik Chandra Saha and Humayun Kabir Balu.

Bangladesh police detained two activists of the party from Bagmara Upazila on 10 April 2007.

On 28 January 2014, police killed PBCP leader Islam Sabuj in a gunfight in Phultala upazila. On 24 December 2015, three leaders of the party in Tangail were killed in a shootout with Rapid Action Battalion-12.

Seven hundred activists of Purbo Banglar Communist Party, New Biplobi Communist Party, and Purbo Banglar Sorbohara Party surrendered in a ceremony to the minister of home affairs, Asaduzzman Khan, in April 2019.

== Ideology ==
The PBCP follows a Maoist and staunchly nationalist ideology it aims to overthrow the Bangladeshi government and replace it with a communist state inspired by Maoist era China. The PBCP is staunchly anti-India, it views India as a hegemon in the region.

The PBCP carries out assassination and other violent actions in order to intimidate its enemies it has also clashed with Islamic extremist groups. The PBCP extorts money from land owners and contractors they also "tax" contractors who work in areas under their influence.

== Factions ==
=== Marxist Leninist ===
Purba Banglar Communist Party - Marxist–Leninist (Communist Party of East Bengal-Marxist–Leninist)

=== Lal Pataka ===
In 1997, Mizanur Rahman Tutul and Quamrul Islam Mastar formed a Purba Banglar Communist Party faction called Marxist–Leninist (Laal Pataka) [Red Flag]. Tutul was having issues with his former mentor Mofakkhar Chowdhury. Quamrul Islam Mastar was killed in a crossfire incident in August 2006 after which Tutul led the faction.

Mizanur Rahman Tutul, who was a doctor by profession, was the leader of the Marxist–Leninist faction. He was detained by the Rapid Action Battalion on 25 July 2008 from Uttara. His mother held a press conference Jhenidah Press Club requesting the government to not kill her son extrajudicially in a crossfire on 26 July. He was killed in a crossfire on 27 July Naogaon District. Odhikar condemned his killing in a crossfire.

Abdul Kuddus, a leader of the Lal Pataka faction, was killed in a shootout with the Rapid Action Battalion in Kushtia on 5 April 2018.

=== Janajuddha ===
Purba Banglar Communist Party - Marxist–Leninist (Janajuddha) Split from PBCP-ML in June 2003. From 2003 to 2005, Janajuddha claimed to have killed 272 people. According to The Daily Star, from 2004 to 2008 law enforcement had killed more than 400 members of Janajuddha. Mofakkhar Chowdhury led the Janajuddha faction till he was killed by the Rapid Action Battalion on 17 December 2004 in a crossfire incident. His successor, Abdur Rashid Malitha Tapan, was also killed in a crossfire incident by Rapid Action Battalion on 19 June 2008 along with a female companion in Kushtia. Rapid Action Battalion raided Tapan's house on 20 June 2008 in Ishwardi.

The PBCP and it splinter factions are hostile to each other the PBCP has killed 18 in a turf war with rival groups.

=== New Purbo Banglar Communist Party ===
In April 2019, 596 activists of New Purbo Banglar Communist Party surrendered to the police along with activists from Lal-Pataka faction, Nakshal, Kadamati, and Purbo Banglar Sarbahara.

== See also ==
- Gono Mukti Fouz
