= Jamaat-ul-Mujahideen Bangladesh =

Radical Islamist organisation in Bangladesh

- জামাত-উল-মুজাহিদীন বাংলাদেশ
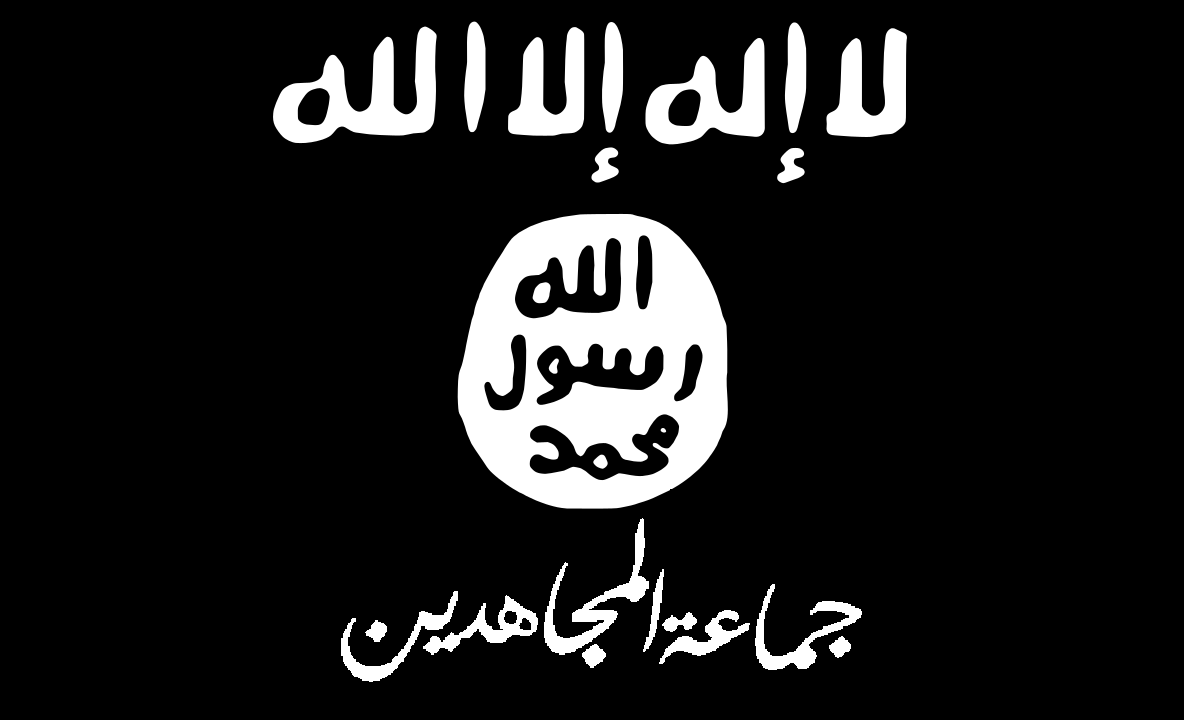
- Flag of Jaamat-ul-Mujahideen Bangladesh
- Founders: Bangla Bhai; Shaykh Abdur Rahman
- Leaders: Bangla Bhai (? - 2006), Shaykh Abdur Rahman (1998 - 2006) and several others
- Dates active: 1998–present
- Ideology: Islamism; Islamic fundamentalism Islamic extremism Islamic terrorism Anti-Ahmadi Sentiment; Anti-Democracy; Atheistphobia
- Status: Active
- Size: 10,000+ Troops (2015)

Jamaat-ul-Mujahideen Bangladesh ("Assembly of Mujahideen–Bangladesh", abbreviated: JMB; Bengali: জামাত-উল-মুজাহিদীন বাংলাদেশ) is an Islamist militant organisation operating in Bangladesh. It is listed as a terror group by Bangladesh, India, Malaysia, The United Kingdom and Australia. It was founded in April 1998 in Palampur in Dhaka Division by Abdur Rahman and gained public prominence in 2001 when bombs and documents detailing the activities of the organisation were discovered in Parbatipur in Dinajpur district. The JMB was officially declared a terrorist organisation and banned by the government of Bangladesh in February 2005 after attacks on NGOs. But it struck again in mid-August when it detonated 500 small bombs at 300 locations throughout Bangladesh. The group re-organised and committed several public murders in 2016 in northern Bangladesh as part of a wave of attacks on secularists.

The JMB was believed to have contained at least 10,000 members, and have an extensive network of organisations, including connections to legal Islamist organisations. Six of the top leaders of JMB were captured by the RAB security forces in 2005. After being tried and convicted in court, on the evening of 29 March 2007, four were executed by hanging for the killing of two judges and for the August 2005 bombings.

In two separate incidents in 2015, it was discovered that JMB had been receiving financing from officers at the Pakistan High Commission in Dhaka. Visa Attache, Mazhar Khan, was caught red-handed at a meeting with a JMB operative in April 2015, who said that they were involved in pushing large consignments of fake Indian currency into West Bengal and Assam. Second Secretary, Farina Arshad, was expelled by Bangladesh in December 2015 after a JMB operative admitted to having received 30,000 Taka from her.

An offshoot of the group, the Neo-Jamaat-ul-Mujahideen Bangladesh, effectively operates as the ISIL in Bangladesh.

== Ideology ==
The JMB's aim is to replace the government of Bangladesh with an Islamic state based on Sharia Law. It has explicitly stated on more than one occasion that it opposes the political system of Bangladesh and ostensibly seeks to "build a society based on the Islamic model laid out in Holy Quran and Hadith." The organisation follows the ideals of the Taliban of Afghanistan. Its chief has been quoted as stating that "our model includes many leaders and scholars of Islam. But we will take as much (ideology) from the Taliban as we need." It opposes democracy as being in violation of Sharia or Islamic law.

It also opposes socialism and its avowed objective is to neutralize left-wing extremists, especially cadres of the Purbo Banglar Communist Party (PBCP). JMB also is opposed to cultural functions, cinema halls, shrines and NGOs. In another leaflet it said, "We don't want Taguti (non-Islamic) law, let Qur'anic law be introduced. Laws framed by humans cannot persist and only the laws of Allah shall prevail."

They have claimed responsibility for several violent attacks and bombings. JMB's communiqués reveal a Salafist doctrine that is common across international radical Islamist organisations. A 2005 leaflet proclaimed:

We are the soldiers of Allah. We have taken up arms for the implementation of Allah's law the way the Prophet, Sahabis and heroic Mujahideen have implemented for centuries. If the government does not establish Islamic law in the country after this [third] warning and, rather, it goes to arrest any Muslim on charge of seeking Allah's laws or it resorts to repression on Alem-Ulema, the Jamaat-ul-Mujahideen [JMB] will go for counteraction, Insha Allah.

Several captured members of the group have claimed that their targets include traditional Bangladeshi cultural and non-government organisations such as BRAC, Proshika, and Grameen Bank. Leader Abdur Rahman is alleged to have taught JMB operatives that "it is not a sin to loot valuables of Grameen Bank, BRAC, Proshika, Asa and Caritas as they encourage women to shed the Burqa (veil)."

== Activities ==
On 20 May 2001, 25 petrol bombs and documents detailing the activities of the organisation were discovered and eight of its members were arrested in Parbatipur in Dinajpur district.

JMB is believed to have been involved in an explosion of seven bombs on 13 February 2003 at one of its hideouts. They had been preparing to use them in northern Bangladeshi towns during International Mother Language Day.

In 2005, Jamaat-ul-Mujahideen Bangladesh (JMB) carried out bomb blasts in 64 districts of Bangladesh.

On 17 August 2005, 500 small bombs at 300 locations in 50 cities and towns across Bangladesh detonated within a space of 30 minutes. Dhaka International Airport, government buildings and major hotels were targeted. There were 50 minor injuries and only two fatalities - a child in Savar, near Dhaka, and a Rickshaw-puller in Chapai Nawabganj District - because of the small size of the bombs. Jamaat-ul-Mujahideen Bangladesh claimed responsibility for the bombings. Bombs later in the year were more deadly, resulting in the death of judges, lawyers, policemen and even mere ordinary people.

JMB killed two judges in Jhalakathi in South Bangladesh on 14 November 2005.

The group has also threatened journalists, with more than 55 receiving death threats between September and December 2005.

Following an 8 December 2005 suicide bombing, Reuters reported the group threatened to kill women, including non-Muslims, who did not wear the hijab (veil).

In a 2016 attack on a cafe in Dhaka, the perpetrators were allegedly JMB members.

Members of the group have been convicted for the 2014 Burdwan blast and the 2018 Bodh Gaya bombing attacks in India.

On 11 August 2026, a man named Ariful Islam was arrested in Savar with explosives, explosive-making devices and JMB leaflets by the Counter Terrorism and Transnational Crime (CTTC) unit and was accused of being a JMB militant. He was also connected to a bombing attempt at Motijheel Metro Station on 24 July which injured one during diffusion and another bombing attempt in Ashulia on 31 July.

== Network ==
JMB allegedly received financial support from individual donors residing in Kuwait, UAE, Bahrain, Pakistan, Saudi Arabia and Libya. Certain reports claim that JMB received funding from international NGOs like Kuwait based Society of the Revival of Islamic Heritage (RIHS) and Doulatul Kuwait, Saudi Arabia based Al Haramaine Islamic Institute and the Rabita Al Alam Al Islami, Qatar Charitable Society and UAE-based Al Fuzaira and Khairul Ansar Al Khairia.

South Asian Terrorist Portal (SATP), The Columbia World Dictionary of Islamism and Defenddemocracy.org state that Jamaat-ul-Mujahideen Bangladesh "appears" to be connected with putatively non-violent, legal Islamist group or groups in Bangladesh, Defenddemocracy speculating that Jamaat-ul-Mujahideen Bangladesh is a "proxy" established by the legal Jamaat-e-Islami Bangladesh party to "push the center of gravity of the political debate toward radical Islamism" and make Jamaat-e-Islami appear more centrist. According to SATP, many members of the JMB and JMJB have invariably been found to be cadres of the Islami Chhatra Shibir (ICS), student wing of the Bangladesh Jamaat-e-Islami, which historically came in coalition with Awami League and Bangladesh Nationalist Party. Chhatra League, the student faction of Awami League was also accused of having links with JMB during the July 2016 Dhaka attack.

== Sphere of influence ==
Main areas of JMB operations were:

- Rajshahi Division: Bogra, Sirajganj, Dinajpur, Jaipurhat, Gaibandha, Naogaon, Nator, Rajshahi, Rangpur, Tahkurgaon
- Khulna Division: Bagerhat, Jessore, Khulna, Meherpur, Satkhira
- Dhaka Division: Jamalpur, Mymensingh, Netrokona, Tangail
- Chittagong Division: Chandpur, Laxmipur, Chittagong

== Leaders ==
Since its foundation, the group was led by Maulana Abdur Rahman, a.k.a. Siddiqul Islam a.k.a. Bangla Bhai, and Shaykh Abdur Rahman. Six of their top men were captured by RAB security authorities in 2005. After being convicted at trial, on the evening of 29 March 2007, Abdur Rahman, Bangla Bhai, and four other leaders of the organisation were executed by hanging for the killing of two judges and for countrywide bombings in 2005.

== Organisation ==
The JMB reportedly has a three-tier organisation. The first tier of the outfit consists of activists called Ehsar, who are recruited on a full-time basis and act at the behest of the higher echelons. The second tier, known as Gayeri Ehsar, has over 100,000 part-time activists. The third tier involves those who indirectly co-operate with the JMJB. According to JMJB leaders, the whole country has been divided into nine organisational divisions.

Khulna, Barisal, Sylhet and Chittagong have an organisational divisional office each, while Dhaka has two divisional offices and Rajshahi three. The outfit also had committees in each village and, according to media reports, villagers were being forced to join the committees. If anybody refused, he was branded as a "collaborator" of the PBCP and taken to the JMJB "trial centre".

== Criticism ==
The group has been condemned by other Islamist organisations like the Hefazat-e-Islam Bangladesh. In 2014 spokesman Azizul Haque Islamabadi said:

There is prevailing a congenial and peaceful environment in Bangladesh. People are living in peace and in such a situation the announcement by Al Qaeda chief Zawahiri has made the people fearful and worried. Bangladesh had experienced earlier militant activities and terrorism by Jamaat-ul-Mujahideen Bangladesh and Harkat-ul-Jihad al-Islami. But they could not emerge successful and Al Qaeda would not come out successful in Bangladesh despite their announcement.

Hasinur Rahman claimed in an interview in SATV that, JMB was a creation of R&AW of India.

== See also ==
- 17 August 2005 Bangladesh bombings
- Allah'r Dal
- Shahadat-e al Hiqma
