= 2001 in Bangladesh =

- Centuries: 20th; 21st
- Decades: 1980s; 1990s; 2000s; 2010s; 2020s
- See also: Other events of 2001; List of years in Bangladesh

2001 (MMI) was a common year starting on Monday of the Gregorian calendar, the 2001st year of the Common Era (CE) and Anno Domini (AD) designations, the 1st year of the 3rd millennium and the 21st century, and the 2nd year of the 2000s decade.

The year 2001 was the 30th year after the independence of Bangladesh. It was also the fifth and final year of the first term of the Government of Sheikh Hasina and the first year of the third term of the Government of Khaleda Zia.

== Incumbents ==
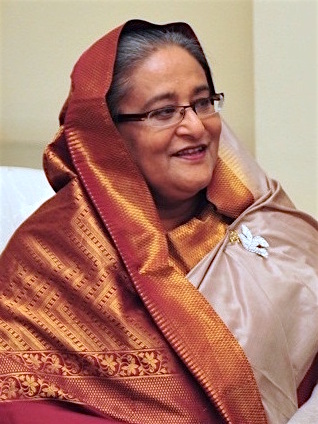
Sheikh
Hasina

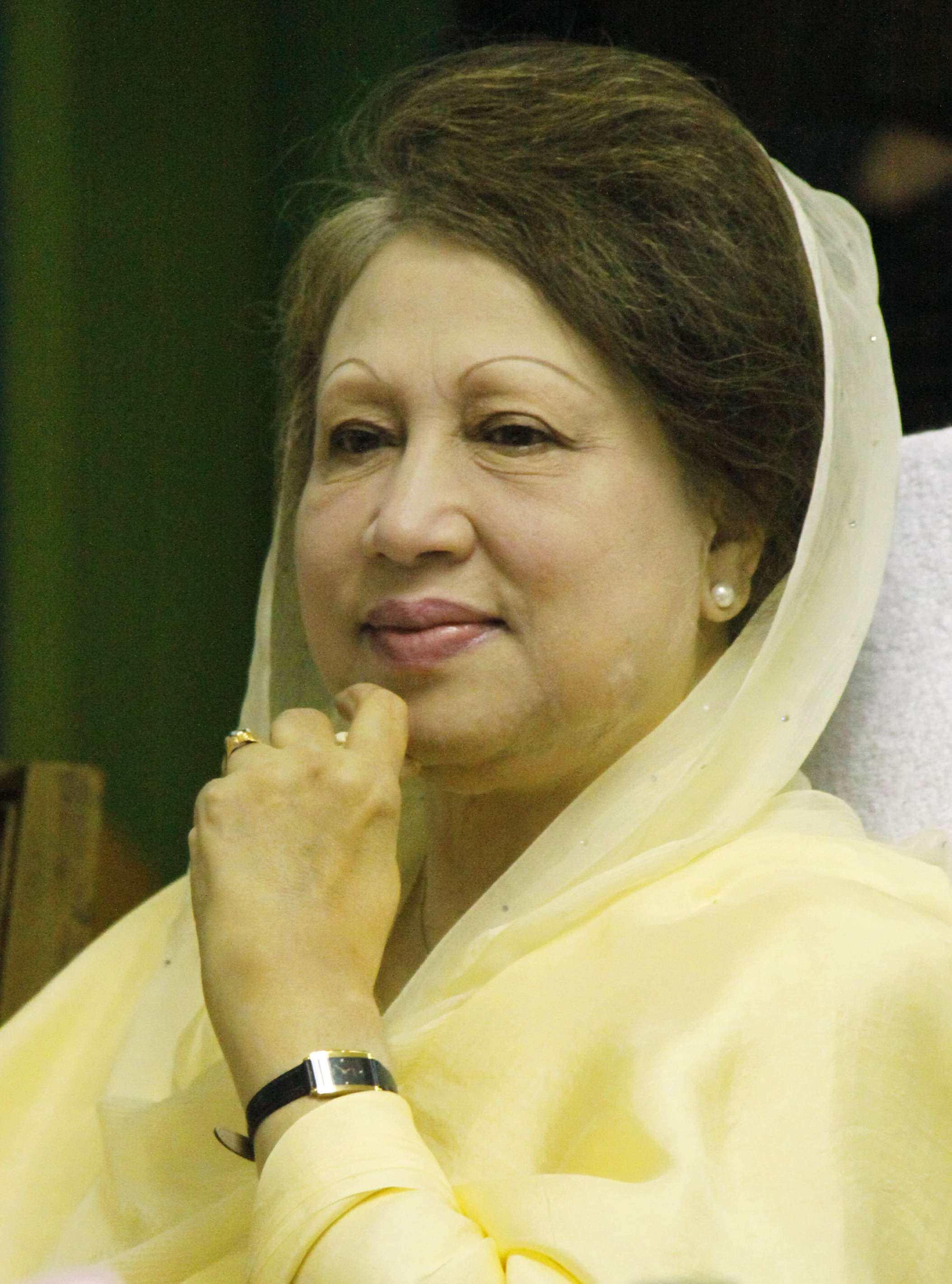
Khaleda
Zia

- President: Shahabuddin Ahmed (until 14 November), A. Q. M. Badruddoza Chowdhury (starting 14 November)
- Prime Minister:
  - until 15 July: Sheikh Hasina
  - 15 July – 10 October: Latifur Rahman
  - starting 10 October: Khaleda Zia
- Chief Justice: Latifur Rahman (until 28 February), Mahmudul Amin Choudhury (starting 1 March)

== Demography ==
Demographic Indicators for Bangladesh in 2001
Population, total	130,088,709
Population density (per km^{2})	999.4
Population growth (annual %)	1.9%
Male to Female Ratio (every 100 Female)	105.6
Urban population (% of total)	24.1%
Birth rate, crude (per 1,000 people)	26.8
Death rate, crude (per 1,000 people)	6.7
Mortality rate, under 5 (per 1,000 live births)	82
Life expectancy at birth, total (years)	66.0
Fertility rate, total (births per woman)	3.1

== Climate ==
Climate data for Bangladesh in 2001
Month	Jan	Feb	Mar	Apr	May	Jun	Jul	Aug	Sep	Oct	Nov	Dec	Year
Daily mean °C (°F)	18.4 (65.1)	21.9 (71.4)	25.3 (77.5)	27.9 (82.2)	28.2 (82.8)	27.8 (82.0)	28.0 (82.4)	28.5 (83.3)	28.8 (83.8)	27.5 (81.5)	24.4 (75.9)	20.1 (68.2)	25.6 (78.1)
Average precipitation mm (inches)	1.1 (0.04)	8.7 (0.34)	29.4 (1.16)	73.7 (2.90)	331.3 (13.04)	361.6 (14.24)	302.5 (11.91)	353.3 (13.91)	192.7 (7.59)	202.7 (7.98)	21.1 (0.83)	0.1 (0.00)	1,878.2 (73.94)
Source: Climatic Research Unit (CRU) of University of East Anglia (UEA)

== Economy ==
Key Economic Indicators for Bangladesh in 2001
National Income
	Current US$	Current BDT	% of GDP
GDP	$54.0 billion	BDT2,913.4 billion	
GDP growth (annual %)	5.1%		
GDP per capita	$415.0	BDT22,395	
Agriculture, value added	$11.8 billion	BDT636.5 billion	21.8%
Industry, value added	$12.2 billion	BDT658.0 billion	22.6%
Services, etc., value added	$27.3 billion	BDT1,473.6 billion	50.6%
Balance of Payment
	Current US$	Current BDT	% of GDP
Current account balance	-$0.5 billion		-1.0%
Imports of goods and services	$9.7 billion	BDT545.1 billion	18.7%
Exports of goods and services	$6,836.9 million	BDT390.0 billion	13.4%
Foreign direct investment, net inflows	$78.5 million		0.1%
Personal remittances, received	$2,104.6 million		3.9%
Total reserves (includes gold) at year end	$1,305.6 million		
Total reserves in months of imports	1.6		

Note: For the year 2001, the average official exchange rate for BDT was 55.81 per US$.

== Events ==
- 1 January – Bangladesh High Court bans religious edicts also known as Fatwas
- 1 February – Shafiqul Islam Liton, a Jubo League leader is shot dead in Khulna
- 20 January – A terrorist grenade attack on a rally of Communist Party of Bangladesh in Paltan Maidan, Dhaka leaves 5 killed and dozens injured
- 14 April – Eight people are killed in bomb blast at a Bengali New Year concert in Dhaka
- 14 April – Sarder Haroon-ar-Rashid, leader of Khulna branch of Awami League, was killed at his residence
- 18 April – Sixteen Indian and three Bangladeshi soldiers are killed in the worst skirmishes since 1971
- 30 April – High Court confirms death sentences on 12 ex-army officers for killing Mujib
- 1 June – A bomb exploded at Gopalganj Roman Catholic church resulting in the deaths of 10 people and the injury of 26 people
- 16 June – a bomb attack at a meeting of Bangladesh Awami League in Narayanganj results in the death of 22 people
- 4 August – Sarder Abdur Razzak, vice-president of Khulna District branch of Awami League is shot dead
- 26 August – 50,000 people are marooned by flash flooding
- 1 September — Operation Uttaran in the Chittagong Hill Tracts is launched
- 13 September – Hasan Tarafder, Khulna City Awami League is killed in Daulatpur
- 23 September – A bomb attack at an Awami League election rally led by Member of Parliament Sheikh Helal Uddin in Bagerhat District results in the death of 9 people
- 1 October – The 2001 Bangladeshi general election is held under the supervision of a caretaker government led by the Chief Adviser Justice Latifur Rahman. Bangladesh Nationalist Party and its coalition under BNP and Jamaat-e-Islami turns out as the winner
- 10 October – Khaleda Zia is sworn in as the prime minister of Bangladesh following a landslide victory in the elections

=== Awards and recognitions ===
==== Independence Day Award ====
Recipients	Area	Note
Sayeda Motahera Banu	Literature	
Shaheed Mashiur Rahman	Independence war	
Alhaz Zahur Ahmed Chowdhury	Independence war	
M. A. Aziz	Independence war	
Muhammad Mayezuddin	Independence war	
Ruhul Quddus	Independence war	
Aminuddin	Independence war	
Dr. Zikrul Haque	Independence war	
Ashfaqur Rahman Khan	Independence war	
M. R. Akhtar Mukul	Journalism	
Bangladesh Cricket Board	Sports	Organization

==== Ekushey Padak ====
1. The Mother Language Lovers Of The World, for its contribution to the declaration of 21 February as International Mother Language Day
2. Foni Borua, music
3. Shyamoli Nasrin Chowdhury, education
4. Nirmalendu Goon, literature
5. Zia Haider, literature
6. Rafiqul Islam, education
7. Binoy Bashi Joldas, instrumental music
8. Shah Abdul Karim, folk song
9. Abdul Matin, Language Movement
10. Golam Mustafa, film
11. Ataur Rahman, drama
12. Mahadev Saha, literature

=== Sports ===
- International football:
  - Bangladesh participated in the Millennium Soccer Super Cup held in India from 10 to 25 January 2001.
- Domestic football:
  - Mohammedan SC won the National League while Abahani Limited Dhaka came out as runner-up.
  - Muktijoddha SKC won Bangladesh Federation Cup.
- Cricket:
  - The Bangladesh national team toured Zimbabwe and played 2 Test matches and 3 One Day Internationals in April 2001 but Bangladesh lost all matches.
  - Bangladesh participated in 2001 Asian Test Championship tournament held in Sri Lanka and Pakistan in August 2001 and Bangladesh lost both matches.
  - Bangladesh hosted Zimbabwe for a 2 Test and 3 One Day International tour in November 2001 before travelling to New Zealand in December 2001 for a 2 Test series. Zimbabwe won four out of the five matches with one of the Test matches resulting in a draw and New Zealand won both test matches.

== Births ==
- 1 January - Krishna Rani, footballer

== Deaths ==
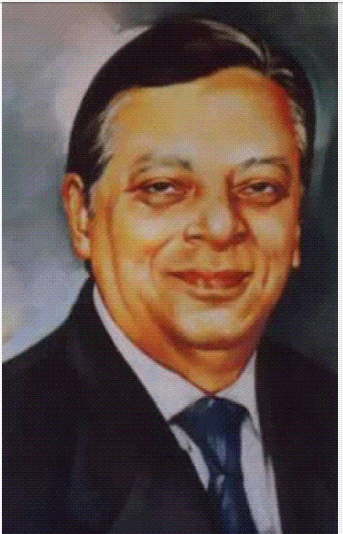
Humayun Rashid Choudhury

- 9 February – M Amirul Islam, scientist (b. 1918)
- 10 July – Humayun Rashid Choudhury, diplomat (b. 1928)
- 28 July – Ahmed Sofa, writer, poet (b. 1943)
- 30 August – A. F. M. Ahsanuddin Chowdhury, justice and former president (b. 1915)

== See also ==
- 2000s in Bangladesh
- List of Bangladeshi films of 2001
- Timeline of Bangladeshi history
