= 2000 in Bangladesh =

- Centuries: 20th; 21st
- Decades: 1980s; 1990s; 2000s; 2010s; 2020s
- See also: Other events of 2000; List of years in Bangladesh

2000 (MM) was a century leap year starting on Saturday of the Gregorian calendar, the 2000th year of the Common Era (CE) and Anno Domini (AD) designations, the 1000th and last year of the 2nd millennium, the 100th and last year of the 20th century, and the 1st year of the 2000s decade.

The year 2000 was the 29th year after the independence of Bangladesh. It was also the fifth year of the first term of the government of Sheikh Hasina.

== Incumbents ==
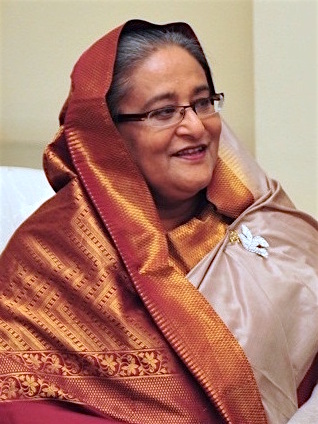
Sheikh
Hasina

- President: Shahabuddin Ahmed
- Prime Minister: Sheikh Hasina
- Chief Justice: Latifur Rahman (starting 1 January)

== Demography ==
Demographic Indicators for Bangladesh in 2000
Population, total	127,657,862
Population density (per km^{2})	980.7
Population growth (annual %)	2.0%
Male to Female Ratio (every 100 Female)	105.7
Urban population (% of total)	23.6%
Birth rate, crude (per 1,000 people)	27.5
Death rate, crude (per 1,000 people)	6.9
Mortality rate, under 5 (per 1,000 live births)	87
Life expectancy at birth, total (years)	65.4
Fertility rate, total (births per woman)	3.2

== Climate ==
Climate data for Bangladesh in 2000
Month	Jan	Feb	Mar	Apr	May	Jun	Jul	Aug	Sep	Oct	Nov	Dec	Year
Daily mean °C (°F)	17.7 (63.9)	19.7 (67.5)	24.1 (75.4)	26.9 (80.4)	27.4 (81.3)	28.2 (82.8)	28.3 (82.9)	28.2 (82.8)	27.5 (81.5)	27.0 (80.6)	23.7 (74.7)	19.4 (66.9)	24.9 (76.8)
Average precipitation mm (inches)	17.6 (0.69)	25.9 (1.02)	85.3 (3.36)	207.1 (8.15)	389.3 (15.33)	391.7 (15.42)	342.5 (13.48)	462.6 (18.21)	328.3 (12.93)	177.8 (7.00)	5.2 (0.20)	0.4 (0.02)	2,433.7 (95.81)
Source: Climatic Research Unit (CRU) of University of East Anglia (UEA)

=== Flood ===
In September 2000, at least 50,000 people are marooned in Bangladesh after flood water gushed into 30 villages when India opened sluice gates of several rivers.

== Economy ==
Key Economic Indicators for Bangladesh in 2000
National Income
	Current US$	Current BDT	% of GDP
GDP	$53.4 billion	BDT2,685.0 billion	
GDP growth (annual %)	5.3%		
GDP per capita	$418.1	BDT21,033	
Agriculture, value added	$12.1 billion	BDT610.0 billion	22.7%
Industry, value added	$11.9 billion	BDT598.2 billion	22.3%
Services, etc., value added	$27.0 billion	BDT1,357.7 billion	50.6%
Balance of Payment
	Current US$	Current BDT	% of GDP
Current account balance	-$0.3 billion		-.6%
Imports of goods and services	$9.7 billion	BDT455.9 billion	17.0%
Exports of goods and services	$7,214.3 million	BDT331.4 billion	12.3%
Foreign direct investment, net inflows	$280.4 million		0.5%
Personal remittances, received	$1,967.5 million		3.7%
Total reserves (includes gold) at year end	$1,515.8 million		
Total reserves in months of imports	1.8		

Note: For the year 2000 average official exchange rate for BDT was 52.14 per US$.

== Events ==
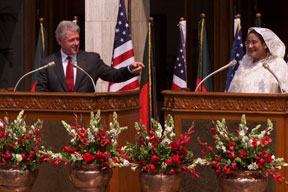
Hasina with US President Bill Clinton at the Prime Minister's Office in Dhaka, 2000.

- 10 January – Peoples Jute Mills Limited workers beat FM Siraj, leader of Awami League, and Manik Mia, leader of Bangladesh Jatiya Sramik League, to death.
- 20 March – President Bill Clinton becomes the first president of America to visit Bangladesh.
- 14 April – Ekushey Television, Bangladesh's first privately owned terrestrial television network, begins transmissions.
- 12 July – Bangladesh and India border guards exchange fire over death of civilians.
- 26 July – Bangladesh announces closure of academic institutions over Dengue epidemic.
- 2 August – The International Cricket Council voted to make Bangladesh the 10th test-playing nation.
- 11 August – S. M. A. Rob, Khulna City Corporation mayoral candidate of the Awami League, was shot dead in front of his home.
- 3 September – Bangladesh repeals Vested Property Act.
- 10 November – The Bangladesh national cricket team make their test debut (see Sports below).
- 25 November – 40 people die, 100 injured in Bangladesh factory fir.
- 15 December – A Pakistani diplomat was expelled from Bangladesh on account of his remark about Bangladesh War of Independence.
- 29 December – A ferry capsizes in the Meghna river leading to 144 deaths.

=== Awards and recognitions ===
==== Independence Day Award ====
Recipients	Area	Note
Syed Shamsul Haque	literature	
Binod Bihari Chowdhury	social work	
Ajit Roy	music	
Ustad Khurshid Khan	music	
Sardar Fazlul Karim	education	
Shahabuddin	painting	
Maulana Abdur Rashid Tarkabagish	literature	
M. A. Rab	independence war	
Sultana Kamal	sports	
Rokanuzzaman Khan	children organizer	

==== Ekushey Padak ====
1. Ekhlas Uddin Ahmed, literature
2. Mohiuddin Ahmed, politics (posthumous)
3. Rafiq Uddin Ahmed, language martyr
4. Abul Barkat, language martyr
5. Syed Abdul Hadi, music
6. Gaziul Haque, Language Movement
7. Khalid Hossain, music
8. Nilima Ibrahim, education
9. Jamal Nazrul Islam, science and technology
10. Abdul Jabbar, language martyr
11. Abdullah Al Mamun, drama
12. Zahidur Rahim, music (posthumous)
13. Sofiur Rahman, language martyr
14. Abdus Salam, language martyr
15. Shamim Sikder, sculpture

=== Sports ===
- Olympics:
  - Bangladesh sent a delegation to compete in the 2000 Summer Olympics in Sydney, Australia. Bangladesh did not win any medals in the competition.
- Domestic football:
  - Muktijoddha Sangsad KC won the first 2000 Dhaka Premier Division League title of the new century.
  - Muktijoddha Sangsad KC participated in the 1999–2000 Asian Club Championship as the 1997–98 Dhaka Premier Division League champions.
  - The National League was organized for the first time in 2000. Abahani Limited Dhaka won the league title while Mohammedan SC came out runner-up.
  - Abahani Limited Dhaka won Bangladesh Federation Cup.
- Cricket:
  - In January 2000, Marylebone Cricket Club (MCC) toured Bangladesh to play five matches including one first-class against the national team. The first class match was drawn.
  - The 2000 Asia Cup was held in Bangladesh between May–June 2000. India, Pakistan, Sri Lanka and Bangladesh took part in the tournament. Pakistan won the tournament beating Sri Lanka by 39 runs in the final.
  - India's national team visited Bangladesh in November to take part in the inaugural Test match played by the Bangladesh national cricket team. The tour consisted of a one-off test match. India won the match by 9 wickets. Bangladesh's Aminul Islam became the third batsman to make a century in their country's inaugural Test.

== Births ==
- 2 March – Nahida Akter, cricketer
- 20 August – Puja Cherry Roy, film actor

== Deaths ==
- 15 February – Shamsul Huda Chaudhury, politician (b. 1920)
- 3 March – Barin Mazumder, musician (b. 1921)
- 1 April – AKM Abdur Rouf, founder-curator of BFA (b. 1935)
- 22 June – Manoranjan Dhar, politician (b. 1904)
- 28 July – Rokeya Rahman Kabeer, academic (b. 1925)
- 4 December – Shyam Sundar Baishnab, singer
- 20 December – Mirza Ghulam Hafiz, politician (b. 1920)

== See also ==
- 2000s in Bangladesh
- List of Bangladeshi films of 2000
- Timeline of Bangladeshi history
