= 2004 in Bangladesh =

- Centuries: 20th; 21st
- Decades: 1980s; 1990s; 2000s; 2010s; 2020s
- See also: Other events of 2004; List of years in Bangladesh

2004 (MMIV) was a leap year starting on Thursday of the Gregorian calendar, the 2004th year of the Common Era (CE) and Anno Domini (AD) designations, the 4th year of the 3rd millennium and the 21st century, and the 5th year of the 2000s decade.

The year 2004 was the 33rd year after the independence of Bangladesh. It was the fourth year of the third term of the government of Khaleda Zia.

== Incumbents ==
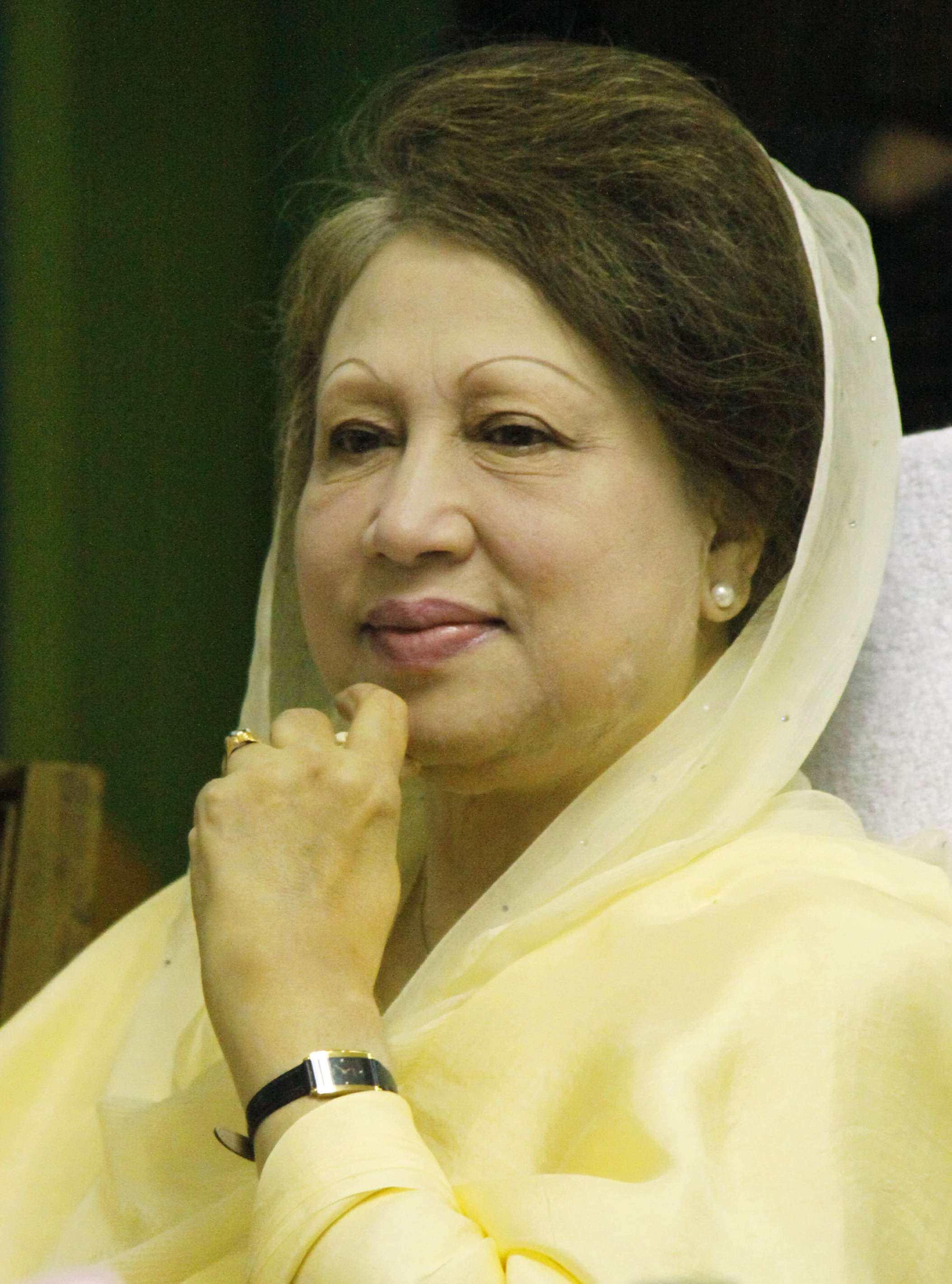
Khaleda
Zia

- President: Iajuddin Ahmed
- Prime Minister: Khaleda Zia
- Chief Justice: Khondokar Mahmud Hasan (until 27 January), Syed Jillur Rahim Mudasser Husain (starting 27 January)

== Demography ==
Demographic Indicators for Bangladesh in 2004
Population, total	136,986,429
Population density (per km^{2})	1052.4
Population growth (annual %)	1.6%
Male to Female Ratio (every 100 Female)	105.2
Urban population (% of total)	26.1%
Birth rate, crude (per 1,000 people)	24.7
Death rate, crude (per 1,000 people)	6.3
Mortality rate, under 5 (per 1,000 live births)	69
Life expectancy at birth, total (years)	67.3
Fertility rate, total (births per woman)	2.8

== Climate ==
Climate data for Bangladesh in 2004
Month	Jan	Feb	Mar	Apr	May	Jun	Jul	Aug	Sep	Oct	Nov	Dec	Year
Daily mean °C (°F)	18.5 (65.3)	20.9 (69.6)	26.3 (79.3)	27.4 (81.3)	29.3 (84.7)	28.4 (83.1)	28.0 (82.4)	28.4 (83.1)	28.1 (82.6)	26.4 (79.5)	23.3 (73.9)	20.2 (68.4)	25.5 (77.9)
Average precipitation mm (inches)	3.8 (0.15)	3.1 (0.12)	40.5 (1.59)	203.1 (8.00)	190.9 (7.52)	563.0 (22.17)	212.1 (8.35)	267.5 (10.53)	166.7 (6.56)	352.6 (13.88)	5.0 (0.20)	7.6 (0.30)	2,015.9 (79.37)
Source: Climatic Research Unit (CRU) of University of East Anglia (UEA)

=== Flood ===
Following early flooding in the northwest districts of Bangladesh in April, monsoon floods intensified in early July, leading to the destruction of the rice crop in that region just before it was harvested. Water persisted in these regions for 3 to 4 weeks whilst gradually draining southwards, severely flooding most of Central Bangladesh. The high water level and widest extent of the flood were reached on 24 July. In total, 39 out of 64 districts and 36 million people were affected. The water had receded in most places by mid-August, but in mid-September, a localised depression caused continuous torrential rain and high winds over a six-day period, bringing renewed flooding to many parts of Central Bangladesh, but also flooding areas never normally flooded by the rivers, including Dhaka and other urban areas.

== Economy ==
Key Economic Indicators for Bangladesh in 2004
National Income
	Current US$	Current BDT	% of GDP
GDP	$65.1 billion	BDT3,832.9 billion	
GDP growth (annual %)	5.2%		
GDP per capita	$475.3	BDT27,980	
Agriculture, value added	$12.5 billion	BDT738.5 billion	19.3%
Industry, value added	$14.8 billion	BDT873.1 billion	22.8%
Services, etc., value added	$34.4 billion	BDT2,024.0 billion	52.8%
Balance of Payment
	Current US$	Current BDT	% of GDP
Current account balance	-$0.3 billion		-.4%
Imports of goods and services	$13.0 billion	BDT602.2 billion	15.7%
Exports of goods and services	$9,117.4 million	BDT427.2 billion	11.1%
Foreign direct investment, net inflows	$448.9 million		0.7%
Personal remittances, received	$3,583.8 million		5.5%
Total reserves (includes gold) at year end	$3,221.8 million		
Total reserves in months of imports	2.9		

Note: For 2004, the average official exchange rate for BDT was 59.51 per US$.

== Events ==
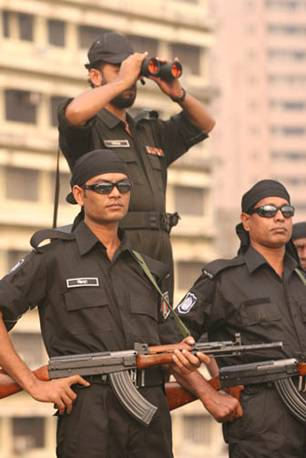
RAB was formed in 2004

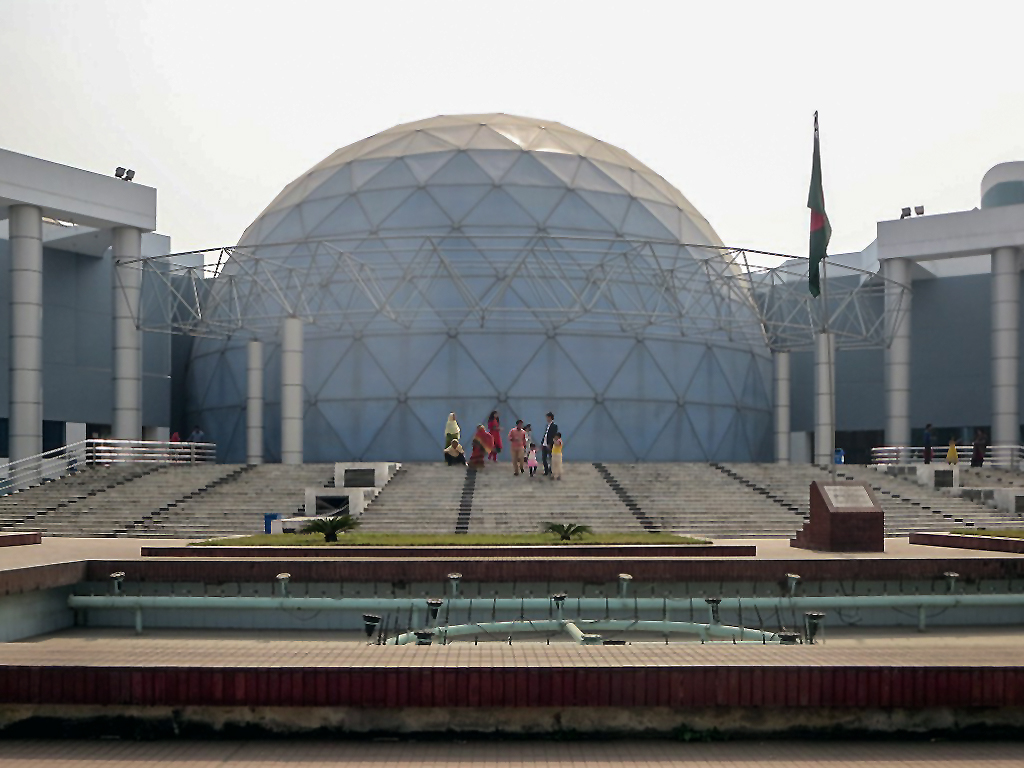
Novo Theatre opened in 2004

- 26 March – Rapid Action Battalion (RAB) is formed for crime control.
- 1 April – Police and Coast Guard interrupt the loading of 10 trucks and seize extensive illegal arms and ammunition at a jetty of Chittagong Urea Fertilizer Limited (CUFL) on the Karnaphuli River. This is believed to be the largest arms smuggling incident in the history of Bangladesh.
- 9 April – Forty people are killed and 1,000 injured by tornadoes in Netrokona and Mymensingh districts.
- 20 May – Three people are killed and dozens injured, including the British High Commissioner in Bangladesh, in a bombing at a shrine in Sylhet.
- 3 August – Bangladesh appeals for aid after flooding that covered 60% of the nation.
- 5 August – Two bombs explode simultaneously at two cinemas in Sylhet, killing one person and injuring 15 others. An unexploded bomb is recovered from a third cinema in the city.
- 21 August – A grenade attack takes place at an anti-terrorism rally organised by the Awami League on Bangabandhu Avenue in Dhaka. The attack left 24 dead and more than 300 injured. The attack was carried out at 5.22 pm after Sheikh Hasina, the leader of the opposition, finished addressing a crowd of 20,000 people from the back of a truck. The attacks targeted Awami League president Sheikh Hasina, who was injured in the attack.
- 2 September – Two former police officers convicted of the rape of a girl in 1995 are executed. A third convicted cop is later executed on 29 September.
- 14 September – Unprecedented heavy rainfall inundates more than two-thirds of Dhaka city.
- 25 September – The Bangabandhu Sheikh Mujibur Rahman Novo Theatre (earlier named Bhashani Novo Theatre) opens to the public.
- 20 October – Three former army officers are sentenced to death for the assassination of Sheikh Mujibur Rahman and his family in 1975.

=== Awards and recognitions ===
==== International recognition ====
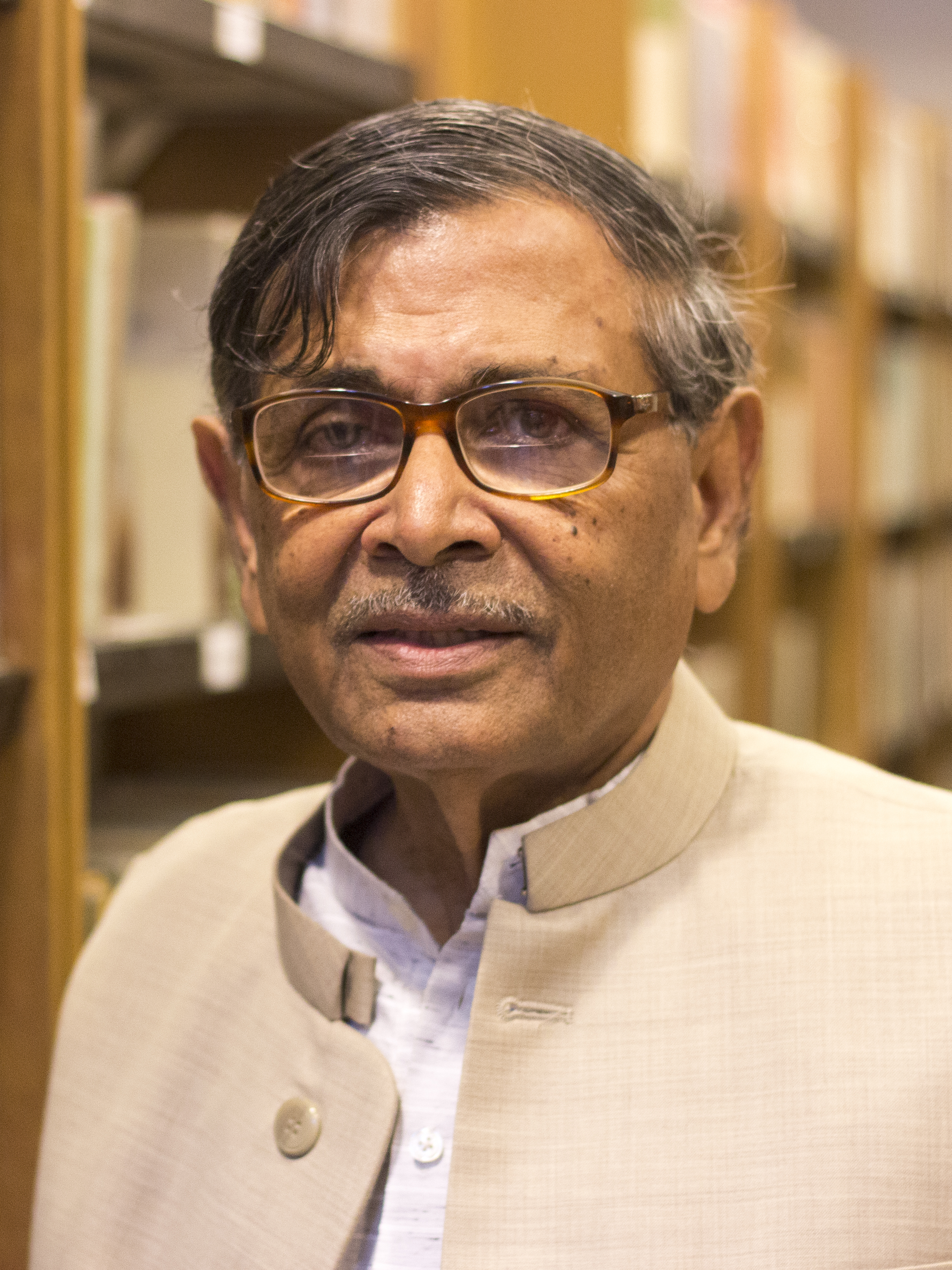
Abdullah Abu Sayeed

- Abdullah Abu Sayeed, the founder of Bishwo Shahitto Kendro, was awarded the Ramon Magsaysay Award.
- ATN Bangla won the special International Children's Day of Broadcasting Award at the 32nd International Emmy Awards Gala in New York City.

==== Independence Day Award ====
Recipients	Area	Note
Oli Ahad	liberation war	
Comrade Moni Singh	liberation war	posthumous
Brig. (retd.) Abdul Malik	medical science	
Muhammad Siddiq Khan	education	posthumous
Abu Ishaque	literature	posthumous
Altaf Mahmud	culture	posthumous
Valerie Ann Taylor	social work	
Bangladesh Ansar and VDP	sports	organization
Rural Development Academy	rural development	organization
Sandhani	social work	organization

==== Ekushey Padak ====
1. Mohammad Moniruzzaman Miah (education)
2. Wakil Ahmed (research)
3. Farida Hossain (literature)
4. Nilufar Yasmin (music, posthumously)
5. Moniruzzaman Monir (music)
6. Mustafa Manwar (fine arts)
7. Nawab Faizunnesa (social service, posthumously)
8. Zobaida Hannan (social service)
9. A.Z.M. Enayetullah Khan (journalism)
10. Chashi Nazrul Islam (film)

=== Sports ===
- Olympics:
  - Bangladesh sent a delegation to compete in the 2004 Summer Olympics in Athens, Greece. Bangladesh did not win any medals in the competition.
  - Bangladesh also made its Paralympic début at the 2004 Summer Paralympics in Athens. The country was represented by a single athlete competing in one sport, and did not win a medal.
- South Asian (Federation) Games:
  - Bangladesh participated in the South Asian Games held in Islamabad, Pakistan. Bangladesh won 3 golds, 13 silvers, and 24 bronzes to finish the tournament in the fifth position in the overall points table.
- Domestic football:
  - Brothers Union (Dhaka) won the National League title while Muktijoddha SKC (Dhaka) came out runner-up.
- Cricket:
  - The Bangladeshi cricket team toured Zimbabwe for a two-match Test series and a five-match One Day International (ODI) series between 19 February and 14 March 2004. Zimbabwe won the Test series 1–0 and the ODI series 2–1.
  - Meanwhile, Bangladesh hosted the 2004 Under-19 Cricket World Cup from 15 February to 5 March. Bangladesh could not progress from the group stage, but Enamul Haque from Bangladesh became the highest wicket taker in the tournament.
  - Bangladesh toured the West Indies from May to June 2004 to play two Test matches and three Limited Overs Internationals. The first test match was drawn, while West Indies won the second test.
  - The New Zealand cricket team toured Bangladesh from 14 October to 7 November 2004. They played two Test matches and three One Day Internationals against Bangladesh. New Zealand won all the matches.
  - The Indian cricket team toured Bangladesh for two Tests and three ODIs from 10 December 2004 to 27 December 2004. India won the Test series 2-0 and the ODI series 2–1.

== Deaths ==
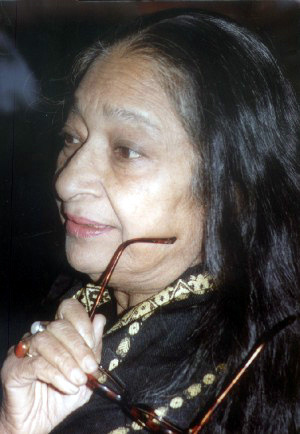
Sumita Devi (1936–2004)

- 6 January – Sumita Devi, actor (b. 1936)
- 10 May – Ershad Sikder, serial killer (executed)
- 29 May – Anjuman Ara Begum, singer (b. 1942)
- 26 June
  - M. R. Akhtar Mukul, journalist (b. 1929)
  - Mainur Reza Chowdhury, jurist (b. 1938)
- 27 June – Humayun Kabir Balu, journalist (b. 1947)
- 12 August – Humayun Azad, writer (b. 1947)
- 24 August – Ivy Rahman, politician (b. 1934)
- 16 December – Nazma Anwar, actor (b. 1941)

== See also ==
- 2000s in Bangladesh
- List of Bangladeshi films of 2004
- Timeline of Bangladeshi history
