= Harkat-ul-Jihad-al-Islami Bangladesh =

Bangladeshi Islamist group

Harakat ul-Jihad al-Islami Bangladesh
- Jihadist flag
- Founder: Maulana Abdus Salam
- Founded: 30 April 1992
- Dates active: 1992–present
- Active regions: Bangladesh
- Ideology: Islamism; Islamic fundamentalism Islamist extremism
- Status: Active

Harkat-ul-Jihad-al-Islami Bangladesh (transl. Jihad movement of Islam of Bangladesh) is the Bangladeshi branch of the Harkat-ul-Jihad-al-Islami (HuJI). It is banned in Bangladesh and is a Proscribed Organisation in the United Kingdom under the Terrorism Act 2000.

HuJI also played an instrumental role in the founding of the Indian Mujahideen and had been involved with its earlier incarnation, Asif Reza Commando Force.

== Leadership ==
The founder of the group was Maulana Abdus Salam. Other well known leaders include Shaikhul Hadith Allama Azizul Haque, who was the chairman of the political party Islami Oikya Jote. Muhammad Habibur Rahman (alias Bulbuli Huzur) was a leader of the HuJI and initially a leader of Bangladesh Khelafat Majlish. The principal of Lalkhan Madrasa in Chittagong, Mufti Izharul Islam Chowdhury, was also a leader of the HuJI.

Another leader of Harkat-ul-Jihad-al-Islami Bangladesh, Ataur Rahman Khan, was elected member of parliament from Bangladesh Nationalist Party. Leader Muhammad Habibur Rahman is a leader of Bangladesh Khelafat Majlis, Principal of the Slyhet Jameya Madania Islamia, and one of the organizers of the 2013 Shapla Square protests by Hefazat-e Islam demanding blasphemy laws. He has also declared a reward for killing Taslima Nasreen. He received the Awami League nomination for elections to be held on 22 January 2007 as part of a coalition deal with Bangladesh Khelafat Majlis which received heavy criticism from local Awami League leaders who threatened to resign en masse. Both were part of a team of Harkat-ul-Jihad-al-Islami Bangladesh which visited Afghanistan and met with Osama bin Laden. They had flown to Pakistan where they were hosted by Qari Saifullah Akhtar and were driven by Abdur Rahman Shahi, a Bangladeshi mujahadeen, to Afghanistan.

Mufti Abdul Hannan is the current leader of the Bangladeshi branch of the HuJI. He is currently incarcerated, convicted of various terrorism charges and has been sentenced to death. He is charged in 25 criminal cases involving terrorism.

== History ==
Harkat-ul-Jihad-al-Islam (HuJI) was founded in 1984 during the Soviet–Afghan War. HuJI Bangladesh was founded on 30 April 1992 in the Bangladesh National Press Club by Bangladeshi mujahideen veterans of the Soviet–Afghan War. The founder of the group was Maulana Abdus Salam.

Since its founding, the group has been responsible for the deaths of over 100 people in various terrorist attacks. The group has been known to support the Rohingya insurgency in Western Myanmar. It allegedly has ties with the Rohingya Solidarity Organisation (RSO) and the Arakan Rohingya National Organisation (ARNO).

=== List of attacks ===
- On 18 January 1999, the group attempted to assassinate poet Shamsur Rahman.
- On 6 March 1999, the group carried out a bombing on the Udichi society in Jessore.
- On 8 October 1999, the group carried out a bombing on the Ahmadiyya mosque in Khulna.
- On 20 July 2000, the group attempted to assassinate the Prime Minister of Bangladesh, Sheikh Hasina.
- On 20 January 2001, the group bombed a communist party rally in Dhaka.
- On 14 April 2001, the group carried out a bombing on Bengali New Year celebrations in Ramna Park.
- On 3 June 2001, the group bombed a church service in Gopalganj.
- On 16 June 2001, the group bombed the Bangladesh Awami League office in Narayanganj.
- On 23 September 2001, the group bombed a rally held by the Bangladesh Awami League in Bagerhat.
- On 21 May 2004, the group bombed the Shah Jalal Shrine in Sylhet, targeting the British High Commissioner in Sylhet.
- On 21 June 2004, the group bombed a rally by Suranjit Sengupta in Sunamganj.
- On 7 August 2004, the group attacked a rally held by the Bangladesh Awami League in Sylhet.
- On 24 August 2004, the group attacked a rally held by the Bangladesh Awammi League in Dhaka, led by Shiekh Hasina.
- On 27 January 2005, the group attacked a rally held by the Bangladesh Awami League, led by Shah A M S Kibria.
