= Munshi Atiqur Rahman =

Former assistant police superintendent from Bangladesh

Munshi Atiqur Rahman is a retired Bangladesh Police officer who served as an Assistant Superintendent of Police in the Criminal Investigation Department. He was charged and convicted for attempting to cover up the 2004 Dhaka grenade attack.

== Career ==
Rahman led the Criminal Investigation Department in raiding the home of Maulana Abdur Rahman, leader of Harkat-ul-Jihad-al-Islami Bangladesh, in January 1999 after the attempted assassination of Shamsur Rahman. He also issued orders for the arrest of another leader of Harkat-ul-Jihad-al-Islami Bangladesh, Maulana Atiqur Rahman.

Rahman filed a case over the Attempted assassination of Sheikh Hasina in 2000.

On 21 August 2004, a rally of former Prime Minister of Bangladesh, Sheikh Hasina, was attacked with grenades. Criminal Investigation Department (CID) was given the responsibility to investigate the case. In order to protect the real culprits the CID officers forced a petty criminal, Joj Miah, into confessing the crime. Rahman was one of the officers involved in the investigation.

Rahman was the investigation officer of the Shah A M S Kibria assassination case. Kibria was assassinated in January 2004. On 10 March 2005, he submitted charge sheet against ten people which was rejected by the family members of Kibria.

Rahman was present at the interrogation of Mufti Hannan, head of Harkat-ul-Jihad-al-Islami Bangladesh in 2006. Also present at the interrogation were Abdul Aziz Sarkar, Director General of Rapid Action Battalion, Colonel Gulzar Uddin Ahmed, and Ruhul Amin. Rahman informed Minister of Home Affairs Lutfozzaman Babar about Mufti Hannan's confession who seemed displeased at the development as observed by Colonel Gulzar.

Rahman sought more time from the Sylhet divisional Speedy Trial on 7 March 2007 to investigate the assassination of Shah A M S Kibria. After Rahman retired, Assistant Superintendent of Police Md Rafiqul Islam of the CID took over the investigation.

Rahman testified in Sylhet at a hearing on the attempted assassination of the British High Commissioner in Bangladesh Anwar Chowdhury in January 2008. He was summoned by the court on 27 December 2007.

In April 2009, CID carried out raids attempting to arrest Rahman. On 5 July 2011, Rahman's properties in Mirpur Thana, Dhaka were confiscated by Mirpur Police station after he had been made an accused in the 2004 Dhaka grenade attack case. They failed to detain Rahman as he was not present in his house. He was sentenced to two years imprisonment on 11 October 2018 for his role in the 2004 Dhaka grenade attack case.

On 18 March 2012, Rahman, Superintendent of Police Ruhul Amin, Assistant Superintendent of Police Abdur Rashid, and the former Inspector General of Police Khoda Baksh Chowdhury were charged with misleading the initial investigation into the 2004 Dhaka grenade attack in the supplementary charge sheet.

Rahman and five other police officers charged in the 2004 Dhaka grenade attack were granted bail by Speedy Trial Tribunal-1 presided by Judge Shahed Nuruddin.

The new investigation officer of the 2004 Dhaka grenade attack case, Abdul Kahar Akond of CID, testified in court on 25 September 2016 and implicated Rahman as one of the officers who tried to create a cover-up to protect the planners of the attack.
