= 1999 in Bangladesh =

- Centuries: 20th; 21st
- Decades: 1970s; 1980s; 1990s; 2000s; 2010s
- See also: Other events of 1999; List of years in Bangladesh

1999 (MCMXCIX) was a common year starting on Friday of the Gregorian calendar, the 1999th year of the Common Era (CE) and Anno Domini (AD) designations, the 999th year of the 2nd millennium, the 99th year of the 20th century, and the 10th and last year of the 1990s decade.

The year 1999 was the 28th year after the independence of Bangladesh. It was also the fourth year of the first term of the government of Sheikh Hasina.

== Incumbents ==
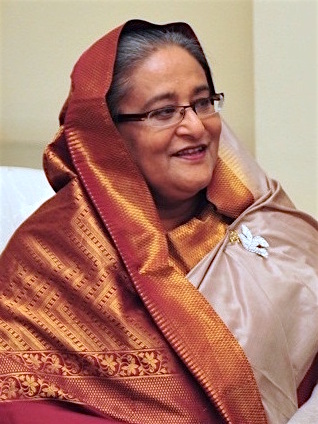
Sheikh
Hasina

- President: Shahabuddin Ahmed
- Prime Minister: Sheikh Hasina
- Chief Justice: A. T. M. Afzal (until 31 May), Mustafa Kamal (starting 1 June)

== Demography ==
Demographic Indicators for Bangladesh in 1999
Population, total	125,189,655
Population density (per km^{2})	961.7
Population growth (annual %)	2.0%
Male to Female Ratio (every 100 Female)	105.8
Urban population (% of total)	23.2%
Birth rate, crude (per 1,000 people)	28.2
Death rate, crude (per 1,000 people)	7.1
Mortality rate, under 5 (per 1,000 live births)	92
Life expectancy at birth, total (years)	64.9
Fertility rate, total (births per woman)	3.3

== Climate ==
Climate data for Bangladesh in 1999
Month	Jan	Feb	Mar	Apr	May	Jun	Jul	Aug	Sep	Oct	Nov	Dec	Year
Daily mean °C (°F)	18.8 (65.8)	22.4 (72.3)	26.2 (79.2)	29.6 (85.3)	28.0 (82.4)	28.5 (83.3)	28.0 (82.4)	27.9 (82.2)	27.7 (81.9)	27.1 (80.8)	23.5 (74.3)	20.2 (68.4)	25.7 (78.3)
Average precipitation mm (inches)	0.1 (0.00)	0.1 (0.00)	5.4 (0.21)	59.3 (2.33)	322.7 (12.70)	358.2 (14.10)	809.2 (31.86)	431.3 (16.98)	311.9 (12.28)	254.5 (10.02)	16.7 (0.66)	10.2 (0.40)	2,579.6 (101.54)
Source: Climatic Research Unit (CRU) of University of East Anglia (UEA)

== Economy ==
Key Economic Indicators for Bangladesh in 1999
National Income
	Current US$	Current BDT	% of GDP
GDP	$51.3 billion	BDT2,465.1 billion	
GDP growth (annual %)	4.7%		
GDP per capita	$409.5	BDT19,691	
Agriculture, value added	$11.6 billion	BDT558.6 billion	22.7%
Industry, value added	$11.5 billion	BDT551.6 billion	22.4%
Services, etc., value added	$25.7 billion	BDT1,237.5 billion	50.2%
Balance of Payment
	Current US$	Current BDT	% of GDP
Current account balance	-$364.4 million		-.7%
Imports of goods and services	$8,932.2 million	BDT409.9 billion	16.6%
Exports of goods and services	$6,235.9 million	BDT289.9 billion	11.8%
Foreign direct investment, net inflows	$179.6 million		0.4%
Personal remittances, received	$1,806.8 million		3.5%
Total reserves (includes gold) at year end	$1,634.4 million		
Total reserves in months of imports	2.1		

Note: For 1999, the average official exchange rate for BDT was 49.09 per US$.

== Events ==
- 10 January – The World Bank announces that tests on water wells in Bangladesh have shown that about 40% are contaminated with arsenic.
- 30 January – Anwar Hossain, leader of Khulna Jubo League, is shot dead.
- 6 March – A terrorist bomb attack on an event of Bangladesh Udichi Shilpigoshthi in Jessore leaves 10 people dead and around 150 injured.
- 26 March – Zahiruddin Panna, leader of the Khulna Jubo League, is gunned down.
- 28 May – Veteran Bangladeshi actor-producer Shakib Khan made his debut with the film Ananta Bhalobasha.
- 31 May – Bangladesh defeated Pakistan in a 1999 Cricket World Cup group match.
- 8 October - Another terrorist bomb attack on an Ahmadiyya mosque in Khulna killed 8 and injured 30.
- 14 October - The U.N. General Assembly elected Bangladesh to non-permanent membership on the Security Council for 2 year.
- 17 November – 21 February is declared International Mother Language Day in the 30th General Conference of UNESCO.
- 11 December - 50 killed as Bangladesh ferry capsizes.

=== Awards and recognitions ===
==== International recognition ====
- Angela Gomes, the founder and executive director of the non-profit organization Banchte Shekha, was awarded the Ramon Magsaysay Award.

==== Independence Day Award ====
Recipients	Area	Note
Mazharul Islam	architecture	
Fazlur Rahman Khan	architecture	posthumous
Mohammad Kibria	fine arts	
Sikandar Abu Zafar	literature	posthumous
Brojen Das	sports	
Begum Badrunnesa Ahmed	social work	
Kalim Sharafi	music	
A. Q. M. Bazlul Karim	education	
A. F. Salahuddin Ahmed	education	
Abdus Samad Azad	liberation war	
Rashiduddin Ahmad	medical science	
A. M. Harun-ar-Rashid		

==== Ekushey Padak ====
1. Hasan Azizul Huq (literature)
2. Syed Hasan Imam (film)
3. Subhash Dutta (film)
4. Ali Zaker (drama)
5. Monirul Islam (fine arts)
6. Husna Banu Khanam (music)
7. Fakir Alamgir (music)
8. A B M Musa (journalism)
9. K G Mustafa (journalism)
10. Altamas Ahmed (dance)

=== Sports ===
- South Asian (Federation) Games:
  - Bangladesh participated in the 1999 South Asian Federation Games held in Kathmandu, Nepal, from 25 September to 4 October 1999. With 2 golds, 10 silvers, and 35 bronzes, Bangladesh ended the tournament in the fifth position in the overall points table.
- International football:
  - Bangladesh participated in the 1999 South Asian Football Federation Gold Cup held in Goa, India, where they lost to India in the final.
  - The 2nd season of the Bangabandhu Cup was held in Dhaka from 27 August 1999 to 7 September 1999. Japan League XI went on to win the cup after defeating the Ghana U–23 team in the finals.
- Domestic football:
  - Mohammedan SC won the 1999 Dhaka Premier Division League title while Abahani Ltd. became runner-up.
  - Abahani Ltd. won the title of Bangladesh Federation Cup while Muktijoddha Sangsad KC became runner-up.
- Cricket:

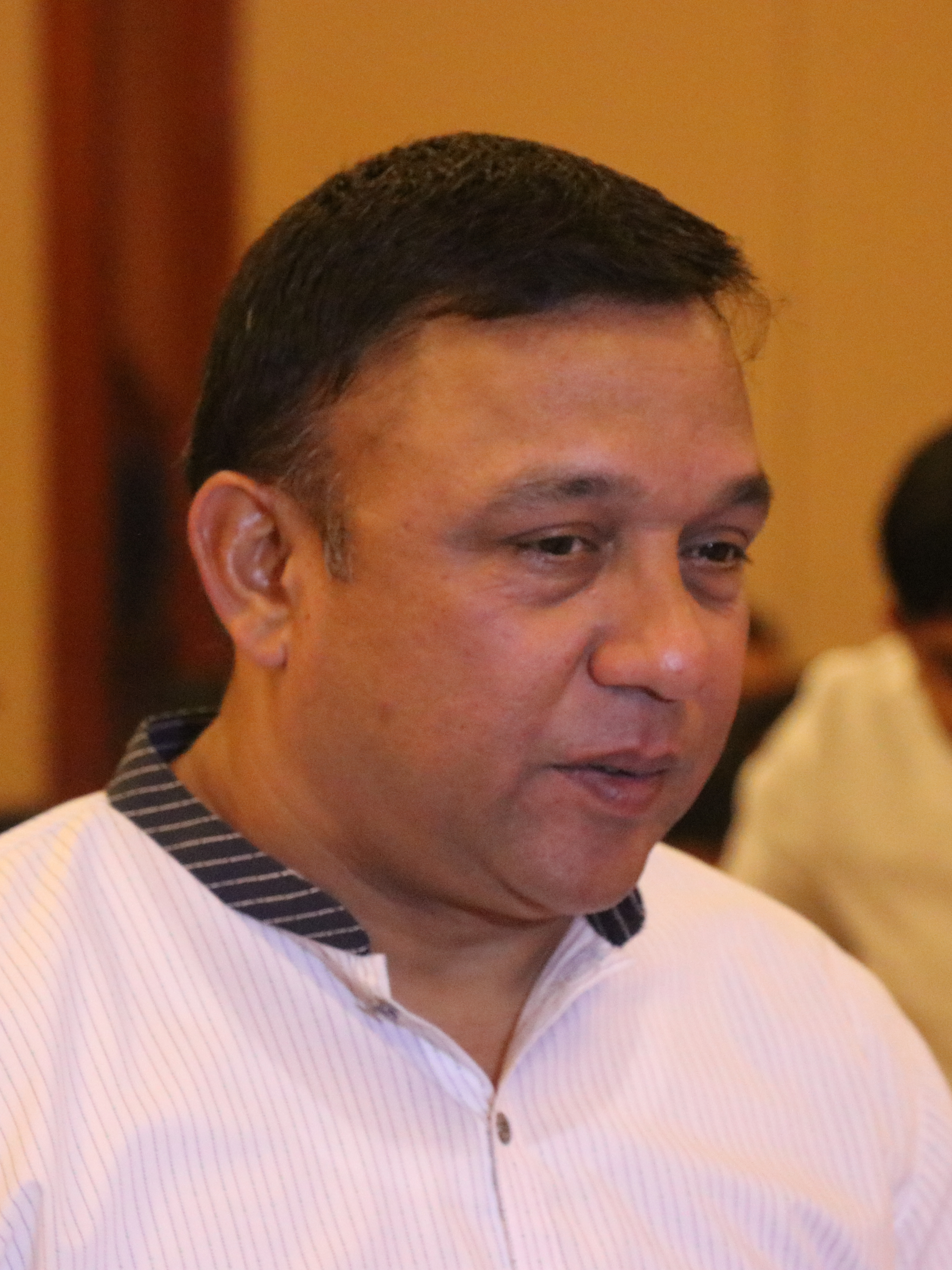
Khaled Mahmud

  - The final of the 1998–99 Asian Test Championship was played at Dhaka in March 1999, in which Pakistan won against Sri Lanka.
  - Later that month, Bangladesh hosted Kenya and Zimbabwe for the List A Meril International Tournament, which was won convincingly by Zimbabwe.
  - Bangladesh participated in the 1999 Cricket World Cup held in England from 14 May to 20 June. Bangladesh did not progress from the group stage, but they managed to defeat Scotland and Pakistan in the tournament. The win against Pakistan was Bangladesh's first win in ODI format against any Test-playing nation. Khaled Mahmud was the man of the match for his all-round performance in that landmark win.
  - In October, the West Indies, led by Brian Lara, played a single first-class match against the Bangladesh national team, which was drawn. The teams also played a two-match series of Limited Overs Internationals (LOI), which West Indies won 2–0.
  - In October and November, an England A team visited Bangladesh and played three matches against the Bangladesh national team. Two of these were first-class matches that were drawn. England A won the limited-overs match by 5 wickets.
  - The National Cricket League was launched in November 1999.

== Births ==
- 10 September – Mahbubur Rahman Sufil, footballer
- 7 October – Mabia Akhter, weightlifter

== Deaths ==
- 27 January – Satya Saha, composer and musician (b. 1934)
- 24 February – Ahmed Sharif, educationist, writer, and scholar of medieval Bengali literature (b. 1921)
- 18 July – Syed Najmuddin Hashim, journalist, politician and writer (b. 1925)
- 18 October – Mahanambrata Brahmachari, Hindu monk (b. 1904)
- 1 November – Dewan Mohammad Azraf, philosopher and author (b. 1908)
- 20 November – Sufia Kamal, poet (b. 1911)
- 28 November – Abdur Razzaq, national professor (b. 1914)

== See also ==
- 1990s in Bangladesh
- List of Bangladeshi films of 1999
- Timeline of Bangladeshi history
