= 1999 Khulna mosque bombing =

Bomb attack in Khulna

- Location: Khulna, Bangladesh
- Date: 8 October 1999 (UTC+06:00)
- Target: Ahmadiyya
- Attack type: Mass murder; bomb attack; terrorism
- Deaths: 8
- Injuries: 30
- Perpetrator: Harkat-ul-Jihad al-Islami

The 1999 Khulna mosque bombing was a terrorist attack on an Ahmadiyya mosque in Khulna, Bangladesh which was happened on 8 October 1999. A remote-controlled bomb was detonated inside the building during Friday prayer, killing seven people and injuring 30 others.

The bombing was the peak of a decade of sectarian violence and organized persecution against the Ahmadiyya in Bangladesh. Throughout the 1990s, Khatme Nabuwat Andolon Bangladesh and Bangladesh Jamaat-e-Islami led multiple campaigns demanding that the government declare Ahmadis as non-Muslims and ban them from holding positions of authority.

The perpertator of the attack was identified as Harkat-ul-Jihad-al-Islami Bangladesh which led to the arrestment of Mufti Abdul Hannan and Shahidul Islam

== Background ==
The Ahmadiyya are a small sect of Islam whom many conservative Muslims consider heretical. There are about 100,000 Ahmadi Muslims in Bangladesh, where 90 percent of the population follow other sects of Islam.

Between 27-29 December 1991, Khatme Nabuwat Andolon Bangladesh held a conference which wanted to ban Ahmadiyya's activity in Bangladesh. Then, on 5 February 1992, Mahfuzur Rahman, the president of the student organization of Khilafat Movement led a public protest in the Noakhali District which demanded that the Ahmadi needs to be declared not to be part of Islam. On 29 February 1992, under the leadership of the Imam Council, a group of Imams from the mosque which are located in the Helatala and Niral mosques attacked the Ahmadi mosque in Khulna. They burned the building and its medical facilities and destroy all the books which they found in the building. Eight people was arrested and members of the Bangladesh Jamaat-e-Islami condemned the arrests.

The second attack was launched on 30 October 1992 involving more than 1,200 people on the Bahshkibazar Ahmadiyya complex in Dhaka. TThe same activities and followed by a bomb explosion, which led to twelve people being injured and admitted to the Dhaka Medical College Hospital. The police held Bangladesh Islami Chhatra Shibir responsible for initiating the attack. On 27 November 1992, an attack occurred at an Ahmadi mosque under construction in Rajshahi, where all the building materials were looted, and the police did not provide any relief regarding this incident.

On 24 December 1993, Khatme Nabuwat Andolon Bangladesh held a conference in Dhaka to demand the government to ban all activities by Ahmadiyah and discriminate Ahmadis for any positions of authority within the government. Ubaidul Haq give an announcmen that the conference will bejoined by islamic scholar from Pakistan, Saudi Arabia, and India. It will be also opened by Abdur Rahman Biswas. Ghulam Azam and Motiur Rahman Nizami supported the conference and the ban of Ahmadis.It was held in two sessions and resulted in an announcement that 1 January 1994 would be a day all conference participants would press the government to declare Ahmadis as non-Muslims. On 30 March 1994, Bangladesh Khilafat Andolan and Islami Andolan Bangladesh joining with Jamaat Islami to do four-hour sit-in rally in Dhaka, which was arranged by the Khatme Nabuwwat to denounce the Ahmadi as kafirs. On 28 February, 1997, 'Ali al-Hudhayfi also denounced Mirza Ghulam Ahmad and other Ahmadi as traitors to islam.

== The attack ==
On 8 October 1999, a remote controlled bomb went off during Friday prayers in the Ahmadiyya mosque in Khulana, Southern Bangladesh, killing seven people and injured 30 people. Multiple bombs were found in an Ahmadiyya mosque by Bangladesh army after the attack which was found in the headquarters Ahmadiyya in Bangladesh on 10 October 1999, and a mosque in Mirpur Thana. The perpetrator of the attack was identified as Harkat-ul-Jihad-al-Islami Bangladesh , which led to the arrest of Mufti Abdul Hannanand Shahidul Islam
