= Gulzar Uddin Ahmed =

Bangladeshi military personnel

- গুলজার উদ্দিন আহমেদ
- Born: 11 March 1964; Brahmanbaria, Bangladesh
- Died: 25 February 2009; Pilkhana, Dhaka, Bangladesh
- Cause of death: Assassination
- Education: Military Training Bangladesh Military Academy
- Spouse: Fatema Sultana (m. 1994)
- Children: 2
- Military career
- Allegiance: Bangladesh
- Branch: Bangladesh Army; Bangladesh Rifles
- Service years: 1983-2009
- Rank: Colonel
- Unit: East Bengal Regiment
- Commands: Sector commander of Bangladesh Rifles; Director (Operations) of Rapid Action Battalion; Director of Intelligence Wing of the Rapid Action Battalion; CO of RAB - 3; CO of 8th East Bengal Regiment
- Conflicts: Bangladesh Rifles revolt †
- Police career
- Unit: Rapid Action Battalion
- Allegiance: Bangladesh
- Branch: Bangladesh Police
- Service years: 2004–2009
- Rank: Director
- Awards: BPM (bar)

Gulzar Uddin Ahmed (Bengali: গুলজার উদ্দিন আহমেদ), also known as Colonel Gulzar, was an officer of Bangladesh Army and former additional director of the intelligence wing of the Rapid Action Battalion.

== Career ==
On 26 March 2004, Gulzar Uddin Ahmed was deputed to Rapid Action Battalion. Mominullah David, Jubodal leader and accused in 31 criminal cases, was killed in a shootout with RAB officers under Ahmed's command in Malibagh in November 2004.

In 2005, the first intelligence wing of the Rapid Action Battalion was formed, and Ahmed was designated chief of the intelligence wing of the Rapid Action Battalion. He and Abdul Aziz Sarkar went to the Taskforce for Interrogation Cell to interrogate Mufti Hannan over the 21 August 2004 Dhaka grenade attack in the presence of Criminal Investigation Department officer Munshi Atiqur Rahman.

Ahmed was notable for anti-terrorism activity against religious extremism in Bangladesh. He was the mastermind of the operation in March 2006, which led to the arrest of hundreds of Jamaat-ul-Mujahideen members, a Bangladeshi terrorist group, and 6 top leaders, including Shaykh Abdur Rahman and Bangla Bhai. He led the operation to arrest Shaykh Abdur Rahman in Sylhet on 2 March 2006. He led the operation to arrest Bangla Bhai in Mymensingh on 2 March 2006. He led the raid that killed Shakil, alias Mollah Omar, bomb expert of Jamaat-ul-Mujahideen Bangladesh, in Comilla on 14 March 2006. His team also captured a large stock of explosives, nitric acid, and grenades belonging to Jamaat-ul-Mujahideen in November 2008. His work against terrorism made him a "National Hero".

In 2006, Ahmed was promoted to colonel and was transferred to the Bangladesh Rifles (BDR), currently known as the Border Guards Bangladesh. Later, he was transferred to the Rapid Action Battalion as additional director general. He reported the arrest of AKM Fazlul Haque Milon, former member of parliament from the Bangladesh Nationalist Party, by RAB on corruption charges on 5 September 2007. He oversaw training of the RAB in human rights from the British High Commission to Bangladesh.

In January 2009, Prime Minister Sheikh Hasina appointed him as the Sylhet sector commander of the Bangladesh Rifles. Rezanur Rahman Khan replaced him as additional director general of the Rapid Action Battalion.

== Death ==
Ahmed was assassinated in the Bangladesh Rifles mutiny while attending the annual gathering of all sector commanders of the Bangladesh Rifles on 26 February 2009. He had called for help but did not get any response during the mutiny. Besides Gulzar Ahmed, all other commanders who were present at the gathering were also assassinated. His body was found ten days after the mutiny with visible signs of torture. It had to be identified using a DNA test. He was buried in the Banani Army Graveyard. It was speculated that he was killed in revenge by terrorists.

== Personal life ==
Ahmed married Fatema Sultana. They had two daughters.

== See also ==
- Pilkhana massacre
- Operation Clean Heart
