= 2005 Begumpet suicide bombing =

Terrorist incident in India

The 2005 Begumpet suicide bombing resulted in the deaths of two persons at the Hyderabad City Police Commissioner's Task Force office at Begumpet. On 12 October 2005, at around 7.30 PM IST, a suicide bomber, reported to be a Bangladeshi national, Dalin, alias Mohtasim Billal, a member of Harkat-ul-Jihad al-Islami (HuJI), a banned Islamic terror group, detonated explosives outside the Task Force office killing himself and 45-year-old home guard A. Satyanarayana.

Ghulam Yazdani, a Bangladeshi national, and Shahed Bilal -- both also accused in the bombing -- were gunned down in Bawana area by a team of Special Cell sleuths on 8 March 2006 and 30 August 2007 respectively. The bombing was reported to be carried out to avenge the killing of Mujahid Salim, son of SIMI patron Maulana Abdul Aleem Islahi, by Gujarat police in 2004.

== See also ==
- Darsgah-Jihad-O-Shahadat
