= Huji =

Huji or HUJI may refer to:

- Hebrew University of Jerusalem, university in Israel
- Harkat-ul-Jihad-al-Islami, Islamic fundamentalist organization
- Hukou system (户籍), household registration system in mainland China and the Republic of China (Taiwan)
