= Sylhet cinema bombings =

Terrorist incidents in Bangladesh

- Location: Sylhet, Bangladesh
- Date: 5 August 2004
- Target: cinema hall
- Attack type: Terrorist incidents
- Deaths: 1
- Injuries: 25 (in total)

Sylhet cinema bombings refers to the bombing of two cinema halls in Sylhet.

== Background ==
In 2002, cinema halls were targeted in Satkhira bombings and Mymensingh cinema bombings. The early 2000s saw a number of bomb attacks in Bangladesh.

In May 2004, there was a bomb attack on the British High Commissioner to Bangladesh, Anwar Choudhury, while he was visiting a shrine, Shah Jalal Dargah, in Sylhet. J. Cofer Black, Ambassador-at-Large and Coordinator for Counterterrorism, was visiting Bangladesh on 5 August 2004.

== History ==
On 5 August 2004, two bombs exploded at Rangmahal Cinema and Monika Cinema in Sylhet five minutes apart. A 12-year-old boy died in the explosions and 20 other were injured in Rangmahal Cinema and five people were injured in the explosion at Monika Cinema. An unexploded explosive was recovered from another cinema hall in Sylhet called Abokash Cinema that day.

The unexploded bomb was recovered by a team of Bangladesh Army from Dhaka who safely detonated it on the grounds of Lakkatura Golf Club. Mokhlesur Rahman, Sub-Inspector of Bandarbazar police outpost, filed a case over the blasts and suspected Shahid, the 12 year blast victim, was the bomb carrier. Shahid's father and three others were detained but no leads were found. Morshed, Sub-Inspector of Kotwali Police Station, filled another case over the blast. The suspects were interrogated in Dhaka by Joint Interrogation Cell. Police detained an Awami League politician briefly.

The responsibility of the case was shifted to Criminal Investigation Department and Assistant Superintendent of Police Munshi Atiqur Rahman. After Rahman retired the investigation was taken over by Inspector Zobayer who filed charges against one named Soleman.
