= Darsgah-Jihad-O-Shahadat =

Islamist group based in Hyderabad, India

Darsgah-Jihad-O-Shahadat (literally The Centre for Jihad and Martyrdom) is an Islamist group based in the southern Indian city of Hyderabad, with branches in the state of Kerala. The group claims to have trained about 50,000 people in self-defence techniques at its training camps in Hazrat Ujale Shah Idgah grounds at Saidabad and Purani Haveli.

The training camps were closed in 2013 after the death of Shaik Mahboob Ali and restarted in 2017. Some of the former members of this group are accused of joining al-Qaeda and its affiliates and of involvement in multiple terror attacks across India.

== History ==
Founded on 4 December 1983 by Shaikh Mahboob Ali (died 2011), the incumbent president of the group is Mohammed Abdul Majid. DJS is known to organise a rally on the anniversary of the Babri Masjid demolition on 6 December and the weekly Ijtema (religious preaching sessions) every Saturday at its headquarter in Moghalpura. The group is described as an Islamist vigilante group and claims on its website of "protecting the life and properties of [the] Muslim community," "preserving the honour and chastity of women," and "Islamic supremacy is our goal."

On 10 November 2012, police arrested eleven DJS activists including Majid for violence in Old City area of Hyderabad in connection with incidents of stone pelting and assault of policemen. On 14 May 2017, Mohammed Abdul Majid was booked by the police for making provocative speeches during a martial arts training camp for Muslim youths.

== Former members ==
- Syed Maqbool - former member of DJS is accused of being part of the Indian Mujahideen's Hyderabad module involved in the Dilsukhnagar bomb blasts of 21 February 2013 in which 17 people died. Indian Mujahideen is a front of the banned SIMI.
- Syed Zakir Raheem - former member of DJS; accused of being a member of Jaish-e-Mohammed group and involvement in the failed assassination attempt of BJP politicians Indrasena Reddy and Baddam Bal Reddy in 2004.
- Mohammed Abdul Shahed also known as Shahed Bilal and Mohammed Abdul Shahid Bilal (d. 30 August 2007) - Lashkar-e-Taiba's south India chief and former chief of Harkat-ul-Jihad al-Islami’s Indian operations, both al-Qaeda affiliates. Bilal and his associates were accused in the Mecca Masjid bomb blast of 2007, Lumbini Amusement Park and Gokul Chat Bhandar bombings of 2007 and the 2005 Begumpet suicide bombing at the STF headquarters. He was one of the accused in the smuggling of RDX into Hyderabad to create communal disturbances. He was reportedly killed by masked assassins of Rasool Khan Parti. in Karachi, Pakistan but some suspect this was a ruse to evade capture.
- Mohammad Abdul Razzak - accused of being member of Harkat-ul-Mujahideen and then Lashkar-e-Taiba and fighting as a volunteer with Al-Qaeda-linked fighters in Afghanistan. During interrogation, he reportedly confessed to have accompanied a supply convoy meant for a Taliban unit in Spin Boldak, and training at a Taliban-run camp near the Afghanistan-Pakistan border. Tasked to recruit Indian nationals in the UAE for Lashkar-e-Taiba, he is said to have recruited Javed Sheikh and sent him to jihad training camps run by the Lashkar military chief Muzammil Bhat who was the architect of the 26/11 Mumbai attack. Javed Sheikh was one of the person killed in a February 2004 encounter with Gujarat Police. Razzak was a staff member of top Lashkar financier Arif Qasmani, accused of bombing the New Delhi-Lahore Samjhauta Express in 2007 and was subsequently sanctioned by the United States Treasury Department.
- Mohammed Viquar Ahmed, also known as Vikaruddin Ahmed - founded Tehreek-Ghalba-e-Islam, had his initial training with DJS. He was accused of killing two policemen, one in Hyderabad in 2009, and another in Maninagar, Gujarat. He was arrested in 2010 and shot dead in 2015 along with four of his associates in the Alair encounter.
- Ghulam Yazdani - owed his allegiance to DJS and was a member of Harkat-ul-Jihad al-Islami and the leader of the Lashkar-e-Taiba's south Indian network. He was one of the main accused in the killing of former home minister of Gujarat Haren Pandya, was suspected to be involved in the 2005 Begumpet suicide bombing at the STF headquarters and the 21 November 2002 bombing near Saibaba temple in Dilsukhnagar in which ten people were injured when a powerful bomb planted in a scooter exploded. He was accused in the conspiracy to bomb a Ganesh temple near Secunderabad railway station. Yazdani was arrested and imprisoned twice in 2000–01. He escaped while out on bail and was a fugitive. On 8 March 2006 he was shot dead in the Bawana encounter with Delhi police.
- Mohammad Abdul Samad - Jeddah-based brother of Mohammed Abdul Shahed accused of recruiting people for attacks, reportedly killed on 30 August 2007 along with his brother, although his death is disputed by other members of his group.

== See also ==
- Deendar Anjuman
