= 2001 Bagerhat bombing =

Terrorist incident in Bangladesh

Coordinates: 22.9254°N 89.8035°E

- Location: Mollahat, Bagerhat District, Bangladesh
- Date: 23 September 2001 (UTC+06:00)
- Target: Sheikh Helal Uddin
- Attack type: Mass murder; bomb attack; terrorism
- Deaths: 9
- Injuries: 100+
- Perpetrator: Harkat-ul-Jihad al-Islami

The 2001 Bagerhat bombing was a bomb attack on 23 September 2001 in Mollahat, Bagerhat District, Bangladesh. It took place at Khalilur Rahman Degree College during an Awami League election rally led by Member of Parliament Sheikh Helal Uddin, and resulted in the death of nine people.

== Attacks ==
The caretaker government had taken charge and had started to make preparations for the 2001 general elections in Bangladesh. In 2001, a number of Awami League events were bombed by suspected Islamist terrorists. Sheikh Helal Uddin, cousin of Prime Minister Sheikh Hasina, was speaking at an Awami League election rally at Khalilur Rahman Degree College ground in Mollahat Upazila, Bagerhat District. Two bombs were thrown which killed 9 people and injured more than 100 people.

== Trial ==
A case was filed following the attack, the proceedings of which were stopped on 19 April 2004 during the Bangladesh Nationalist Party rule. The Home Ministry reopened the case after the Awami League returned to power. After an investigation by the Criminal Investigation Department, charges were pressed against six individuals on 21 August 2011. The accused were Harkat-ul-Jihad-al-Islami Bangladesh chief Mufti Hannan; the former president of the Mollahat branch of the Bangladesh Nationalist Party, Badsha Mia Shikdar; and Jamaat-ul-Mujahideen Bangladesh activists Arifuzzaman, Zillur Rahman, Hafez Mohammad Rakib Hasan, and Abu Taleb.

== See also ==
- 2001 Sunamganj bombing
