= 2001 Sunamganj bombing =

Terrorist incident in Bangladesh

Coordinates: 24.6886°N 91.1410°E

- Location: Sunamganj, Bangladesh
- Date: 26 September 2001 (UTC+06:00)
- Target: Bangladesh Awami League
- Attack type: Mass murder; bomb attack; terrorism
- Deaths: 4
- Injuries: 10

The 2001 Sunamganj bombing was a bomb attack on 26 September 2001 at a meeting of Bangladesh Awami League in Sullah Upazila, Sunamganj, Bangladesh that resulted in the death of 4 people.

== Background ==
The caretaker government was in charge and responsible for holding the general elections. The government had deployed 50 military personnel for extra security during the election. A Bangladesh Awami League election rally on 23 September 2001 was bombed in Bagerhat District.

== Attacks ==
Bangladesh Awami League were campaigning for the 2001 Bangladeshi general election. On 26 September 2001, a Bangladesh Awami League rally in Sunamganj District was bombed killing 4 and wounding 10 people.

== Trial ==
The bombing's perpetrator remains unknown as of 2008.
