= 1999 Jessore bombings =

Bangladesh terrorist attack

- Location: Jessore, Bangladesh
- Date: 6 March 1999 (UTC+06:00)
- Target: Bangladesh Udichi Shilpigoshthi
- Attack type: Mass murder; bombing; terrorism
- Weapon: Time bombs
- Deaths: 10
- Injuries: 150
- Perpetrator: Harkat-ul-Jihad al-Islami

A terrorist attack on an event of Bangladesh Udichi Shilpigoshthi in Jessore, Bangladesh occurred on 6 March 1999. Two time bombs were used to kill 10 people and injure another 150.

== Background ==
Bangladesh Udichi Shilpigoshthi is the largest cultural organisation in Bangladesh. In 2013, the organisation was awarded the Ekushey Padak, the Bangladesh's most prestigious award. Since 1999, many veteran jihadists from Afghanistan returned to Bangladesh and carried out attacks in Bangladesh.

== Attack ==
The attacks happened after midnight at a cultural event of Udichi Shilpigoshthi in Jessore, Bangladesh. Five people were killed at the scene. Two time bombs exploded. The attacks took place on 6 March 1999. The event was taking place in Jessore Town Hall grounds. 10 people were killed. The attacks were carried out by Harkat-ul-Jihad-al-Islami Bangladesh. Over 100 people were injured.

== Trial ==
Mufti Abdul Hannan, the leader of Harkat-ul-Jihad al-Islami Bangladesh, admitted his role in the attack after his arrest and called the bombing a success.
