= 2001 Narayanganj bombing =

Terrorist incident in Bangladesh

- Location: Narayanganj, Bangladesh
- Date: 16 June 2001 (UTC+06:00)
- Target: Bangladesh Awami League
- Attack type: Mass murder; bomb attack; terrorism
- Deaths: 22
- Injuries: 100
- Perpetrator: Harkat-ul-Jihad al-Islami

The 2001 Narayanganj bombing was a bomb attack on 16 June 2001 at a meeting of Awami League in Narayanganj, Bangladesh that resulted in the death of 22 people. The motive for the attack cited by the investigators was that the local member of Parliament had banned senior leaders of the Islamist party Jamaat-e-Islami Bangladesh. Harkat-ul-Jihad al-Islami, who were patronized by Jammat, decided to attack Shamim Osman, the local member of parliament, who attending the meeting.

== Attacks ==
On 16 June 2001 there was bomb attack at a meeting of Bangladesh Awami League in the local party office in Narayanganj, Bangladesh. The local Member of Parliament Shamim Osman was injured in the attack. The roof composed of corrugated tin was destroyed in the explosion. The bomb was under a table in the office.

== Trial ==
In April 2001 27 people were accused in the cases filed over the bomb attack. The case was closed under the Bangladesh Nationalist Party government. The case was reopened in 2009 after the Bangladesh Awami League came to power. The trial has stalled because of the prosecution has failed to bring the accused to court. Mufti Hannan, chief of Harkat-ul-Jihad al-Islami, is in custody but cannot be presented in court dates because he is accused in 51 cases all over Bangladesh. This has delayed trial. Two of the accused are in Jail in New Delhi, India and two other have been freed on bail.

== Reactions ==
- Prime Minister Sheikh Hasina said, "I call upon the nation to resist this type of political terrorism for the sake of democracy,".
