= Rezanur Rahman Khan =

Bangladeshi military personnel

- Military career
- Allegiance: Bangladesh
- Branch: Bangladesh Army; Bangladesh Ansar; Bangladesh Rifles
- Service years: 1981 – 2016
- Rank: Major General
- Unit: East Bengal Regiment
- Commands: Commandant of BIPSOT; GOC of 55th Infantry Division; Military Secretary at Army Headquarters; Commandant of East Bengal Regimental Centre; Additional Director (Operations) of Rapid Action Battalion; Sector Commander of Bangladesh Rifles
- Conflicts: UNMEE; UNOMUR
- Police career
- Unit: Rapid Action Battalion
- Allegiance: Bangladesh
- Branch: Bangladesh Police
- Service years: 2009
- Rank: Additional Director General

Rezanur Rahman Khan is a retired major general of the Bangladesh Army and a former ambassador of Bangladesh to Iraq. He was a former additional director general of the Rapid Action Battalion. He was the general officer commanding Jessore Cantonment.

== Career ==
Khan was commissioned as an officer of the East Bengal Regiment of the Bangladesh Army on 27 December 1981.

Khan had served as the commander of the Army Security Unit. He also served in the United Nations Mission in Ethiopia and Eritrea and the United Nations Observer Mission Uganda–Rwanda. He was the general officer commanding in the 55th Infantry Division based in Jashore Cantonment. He was the vice president of the Jessore Golf Club.

Khan served in Bangladesh Rifles in 2005 as a sector commander. He was the deputy commandant of the East Bengal Regimental Centre in Chittagong Cantonment in 2007 and eventually became commandant after being advanced to brigadier general in September 2009.

In January 2009, Khan was appointed additional director general of the Rapid Action Battalion, replacing Colonel Gulzar Uddin Ahmed. He oversaw the detention of two Bangladesh Chhatra League leaders protesting Prime Minister Sheikh Hasina's resignation from the organisation in 2009. He targeted Jamaatul Mujahideen Bangladesh. In December 2010, he was appointed military secretary at Army headquarters after being promoted to major general.

Khan was the commandant of the Bangladesh Institute of Peace Support Operation Training from 8 February 2016 to 11 August 2016.

In September 2013, Khan was appointed the ambassador of Bangladesh to Iraq. He replaced Muhammad Kamaluddin. He visited the Bismaya New City Project after Iraqi security officials assaulted Bangladeshi workers due to alleged links with the Sunni insurgency. He secured the salary of Bangladeshi workers trapped in Najaf. He rescued Bangladeshi workers from Mosul. The Bangladesh government resumed sending workers in September 2014.
