= 2001 Gopalganj Roman Catholic church bombing =

Terrorist incident in Bangladesh

- Location: 23.2122°N 89.9688°E; Gopalganj, Bangladesh
- Date: 3 June 2001 (UTC+06:00)
- Target: Bangladesh
- Attack type: Bombs
- Deaths: 10
- Injuries: 26

On 3 June 2001, during Sunday Mass, a bomb exploded at the Most Holy Redeemer Church in the parish of Baniarchor in Gopalganj District, Bangladesh. The bombing killed 10 people and injured 26 people.

== Background ==
Bangladesh is a Muslim majority country where the Catholic population is 0.3 percent of the population. Religiously motivated attacks against the Christian community had been described as "rare".

== Attack ==
The bombs exploded at the Catholic church at Banaripara of Gopalganj district. Ten people were killed at the explosion. Gopalganj is the home district of then Prime Minister of Bangladesh Sheikh Hasina. The police suspected Islamists. The church was holding its weekly prayers when the bomb went off.

== Investigation ==
The army arrived to investigate for approximately 10 hours, detaining many people, but by the end of this period, the police reported no progress. According to media reports Shaikh Abdur Rahman the leader of the terrorist group Jamaat-ul-Mujahideen Bangladesh confessed to the police that his group was behind the bombing of the church. Mufti Abdul Hannan chief of Harkatul Jihad al-Islami (Huji) Bangladesh was taken into remand over the bombing.

== Reactions ==
Michael Rosario the Archbishop of the Roman Catholic Church in Bangladesh described the attack as "barbaric" and hoped the government would find the perpetrators.
