= Attempted assassination of Sheikh Hasina =

2000 attempted assassination in Bangladesh

Attempted assassination of Sheikh Hasina refers to the attempted assassination of Sheikh Hasina, former Prime Minister of Bangladesh, by Harkat-ul-Jihad-al-Islami Bangladesh on 21 July 2000 in Gopalganj District. The authorities found the explosives beforehand and thwarted the assassination attempt.

== Background ==
According to Mamtaz Begum, the judge in one of the case, the accused were motivated by the belief that Sheikh Hasina was against Islam. Islamist in Bangladesh oppose Sheikh Hasina because of her support of secularism.

== Assassination attempt ==
On 21 July 2000, Sheikh Hasina, then Prime Minister of Bangladesh, was scheduled to speak at a rally in Kotalipara Upazila, Gopalganj District. Police discovered a time bomb weighing 76 Kg that was 50 feet from the stage where Sheikh Hasina was scheduled to speak. The rally was set to take place at the Sheikh Lutfor Rahman Ideal College.

== Investigation and trial ==
On 24 July 2000, Bangladesh police raided a house that had been rented by Mufti Abdul Hannan, the head of Harkat-ul-Jihad-al-Islami Bangladesh. The police seized a large amount of explosives from the house. The officer-in-charge of Gopalganj Police Station, Aminur Rahman, filled two cases over the attempted assassination under explosives and arms acts respectively. The investigation of the case was taken over by the Criminal Investigation Department. On 2 November 2001, they pressed charges against six people including Hannan. Charges were framed in the Gopalganj District and Sessions Judge on 1 July 2001. On 13 November 2003 the trial was transferred to the Speedy Trial Tribunal-4. On 31 December 2003, Judge Mohammad Jahangir Alam Mollah accnounced the verdict in the case. He had sentenced Hannan to death and acquitted five others. The five others were Hasmat Ali Kazi, Mahmud Azahar, Mehedi Hassan, Mofizur Rahman, and Shah Newaz.

On 12 April 2017, Hannan was hanged for the attempted assassination of the British High Commissioner in Bangladesh in the 2004 Shah Jalal bombing. In August 2010, the second case was transferred to the Speedy Trial Tribunal from Gopalganj District and Sessions Judge. Judge Mamtaz Begum, of the Speedy Trial Tribunal-2, announced the verdict in the case on 20 August 2017. She sentenced then the accused to death, two were sentenced to life imprisonment, two to 14 years imprisonment, and ten accused were acquitted.
