= 2001 bombing on Communist Party of Bangladesh =

- Location: Dhaka, Bangladesh
- Date: 20 January 2001 (UTC+06:00)
- Target: Communist Party of Bangladesh
- Attack type: Mass murder; bomb attack; terrorism
- Deaths: 5
- Injuries: 70
- Perpetrator: Harkat-ul-Jihad al-Islami

2001 bombing on Communist Party of Bangladesh was a terrorist grenade attack on a rally of the Communist Party of Bangladesh in Paltan Maidan, Dhaka, Bangladesh. Five people were killed in the attack and dozens were injured. The Communist Party of Bangladesh observes 20 January as the "Paltan Killing Day".

== Background ==
The Communist Party of Bangladesh was holding a rally in Paltan Maidan, Dhaka. The rally was 20 January 2001. Communist Party of Bangladesh is the successor organisation to the Communist Party of India that operated in British India. The Party is against religious fundamentalism and is supportive of secularism. Since 1999 many of the veteran jihadists from Afghanistan were returning to Bangladesh and carried out a number of attacks in Bangladesh.

== Attack ==
The bomb exploded in the rally about 600 feet from the main stage. Five people died in the explosion and dozens were injured. Four people immediately and one died at a hospital. Activists of the party reportedly vandalized cars in the streets after the bomb blast. The Attack was carried out by Harkat-al-Jihad al-Islami in Bangladesh.

== Trial ==
Mufti Abdul Hannan and 12 others members of Harkat-al-Jihad al-Islami had been charged over the attacks. In January 2020, ten individuals were sentenced to death in the case. Abdul Hannan had been executed in another case in April 2017.
