= Shyam Sundar Baishnab =

Bangladeshi folk singer

- শ্যামসুন্দর বৈষ্ণব
- Died: 4 December 2000
- Occupation: Folk singer
- Awards: Ekushey Padak

Shyam Sundar Baishnab (died 4 December 2000) was a Bangladeshi folk singer. He was awarded Ekushey Padak in 2008 by the Government of Bangladesh for his contribution to music.

== Career ==
Baishnab originated from Chittagong.
