= Binoy Bashi Joldas =

Binoy Bashi Joldas বিনয় বাঁশী জলদাস
- Born: c. 1 October, 1911; East Gomdondi village, Boalkhali Upazila, Chittagong District, Bengal Presidency, British India
- Died: April 5, 2002 (aged 90–91)
- Instrument: Dhol

Binoy Bashi Joldas (c. 1 October, 1911 – 5 April 2002) was a Bangladeshi dhol player. He was awarded Ekushey Padak in 2001 by the Government of Bangladesh for his contribution to the instrumental music.

== Background ==
Joldas was born to Upendralal Joldas and Sarbala Joldas in 1911 in Chittagong District.

Joldas played dhol with Ramesh Shil, a Bengali bard, for 35 years.

== Personal life ==
Joldas was married to Asitipor Surbala Joldas. Together they had two sons, Shukhlal Das and Babul Das.
