= Vikar Ahmed =

Indian Terrorist

Vikar Ahmed (died 7 April 2015) also known as Vikaruddin was an activist of the Darsgah-Jihad-O-Shahadat. He is a suspect in the Mecca Masjid bombing. He was absconding from Andhra Pradesh police but was caught in July 2010.

He was accused of being involved in the deadly attacks on Hyderabad police in 2009 and 2010. In the 2009 incident, a policeman was killed and another injured when assailants opened fire at Falaknuma area of Hyderabad, while in 2010 a policeman was killed and three others were reported injured when two people, riding a motorcycle, opened fire on a police picket at Shalibanda in the Old City area of Hyderabad.

Vikaruddin along with four other suspected SIMI activists were encountered near Alair in Nalgonda district of Telangana on 7 April 2015 while on their way to Hyderabad Court from Warangal Jail. The five men were killed when one of them allegedly attempted to overpower the security personnel escorting them and snatch a weapon in a bid to escape.
