= Zobaida Hannan =

- যোবায়দা হান্নান
- Born: November 14, 1945; Mirsharai Upazila, Chittagong District, Bengal Presidency, British India
- Died: November 2, 2011 (aged 65); Dhaka, Bangladesh
- Occupation: social activist

Zobaida Hannan (14 November 1945 – 22 November 2011) was a Bangladeshi social worker. She was awarded Ekushey Padak in 2004 by the Government of Bangladesh for her contribution to social activities.

== Social activities ==
Hannan worked into converting Asharkota village, Nangalkot Upazila, Comilla District into a self-reliant locality. She served as the General Secretary of Comilla unit of Bangladesh Jatiya Andha Kallyan Samity (BJAKS) and the President of Child Sight Foundation (CSF).

== Awards ==
- Ekushey Padak (2004)
- Rotary SEED Award 2004-2005
- Anannya Award (2006)
