= AKM Abdur Rouf =

Ekushey Padak recipient

A. K. M. Abdur Rouf
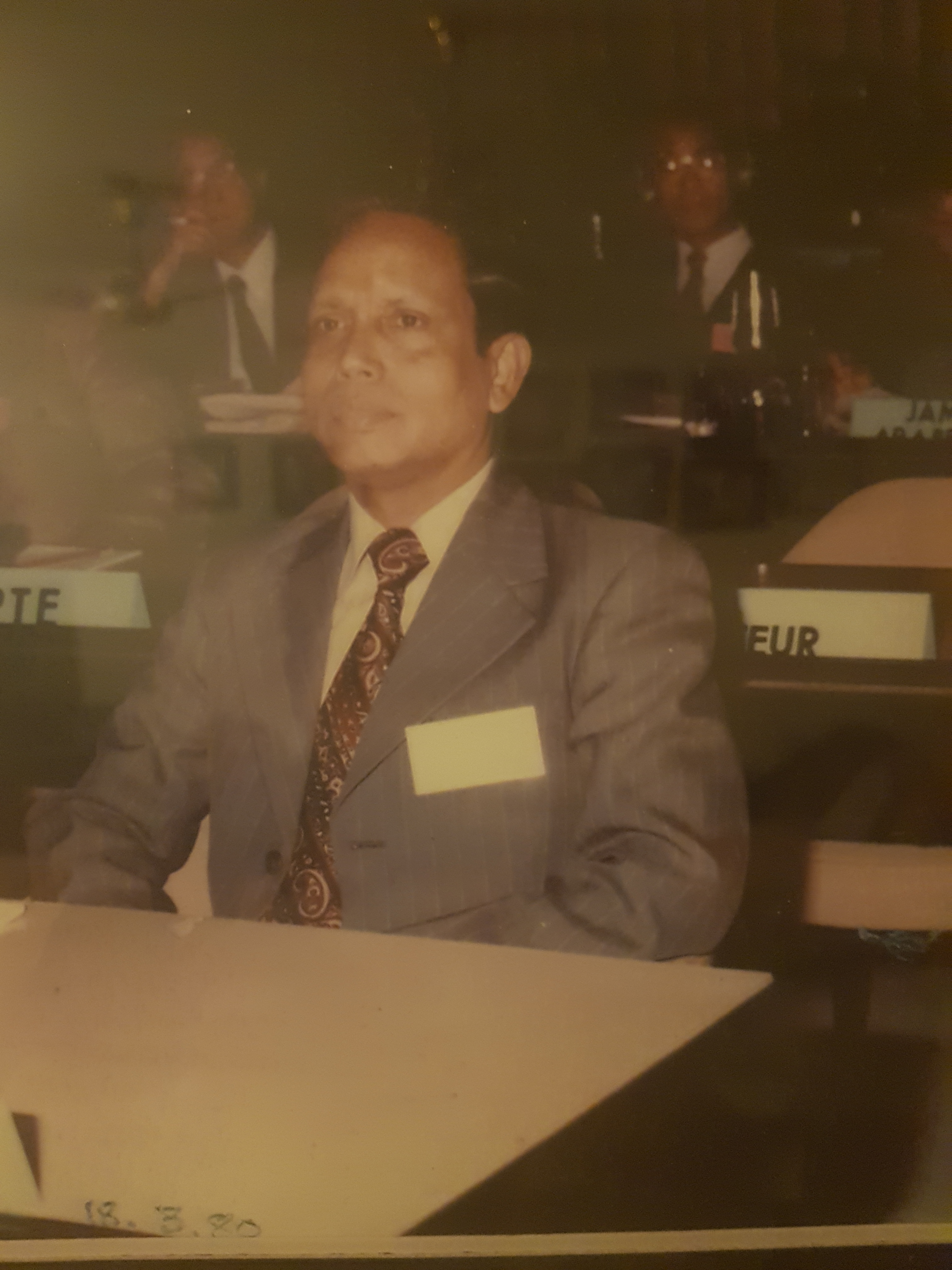
- Born: 15 December 1935; Khulna District, Bengal Presidency, British India
- Died: 1 April 2000 (aged 64); Dhaka, Bangladesh
- Spouse: Rashida Rouf (m. 1958; d. 1979) Shahanara Rouf (m. 1982; d. 2020)
- Children: 5
- Awards: Ekushey Padak, Independence Day Award

A. K. M. Abdur Rouf (15 December 1935 – 1 April 2000) was the founder-curator of the Bangladesh Film Archive (BFA). He was awarded Ekushey Padak in 2010 for his contribution to arts and Independence Day Award in 2016 in recognition of his outstanding contributions to the nation by the government of Bangladesh.

== Early life and career ==
Rouf was born on 15 December 1935, Khulna to Haji Mohammad Kinu Sheikh and Amena Begum. He did his Matriculation in 1952. He completed his Intermediate Certificate from Jagannath College, Dhaka in 1954 and graduated from Govt. College of Arts & Crafts, Dhaka in 1959.

He started his career as a civil service cadre in East Pakistan. During the Independence War, Rouf was the first among few to defect from the East Pakistan Government Service and actively participated in the Bangladesh Independence Movement under the guidance of the late justice Abu Sayeed Chowdhury.

He was the calligrapher of the constitution (1972) of People's Republic of Bangladesh. During his role as the founder curator of Bangladesh Film Archive, Rouf collected documents and prints of old films. His collection included a print of Mukh O Mukhosh, photographs of the first silent film made in Dhaka, The Last Kiss; a print of Dhrubo, (1934) directed by Kazi Nazrul Islam; Pramathesh Barua's Devdas and a print of the first silent film made in the sub-continent, Raja Harish Chandra.

Abdur Rouf designed the five taka coin and the official postage stamp of four taka commemorating the Bangabandhu Jamuna Multi-Purpose Bridge in 1996.

In 2018, the Abdur Rouf foundation started its journey of behalf of his memory aiming to help unprivileged children in Bangladesh.

Rouf was also a cover designer. He designed covers of nearly 2,800 books.

He died on 1 April 2000.
