= M Amirul Islam =

M Amirul Islam (1918-2001) was a Bangladesh academic, researcher, and scientist. He developed the Seven Soil Tracts system, a classification of the soil of Bangladesh, which is the foundation of agriculture and soil management in Bangladesh.

== Early life ==
Islam was born on 1 September 1918 in Noakhali District, East Bengal, British India. In 1936, he completed his Matriculation and in 1938 his Intermediate examination. He graduated from the University of Dhaka in 1941 with a BSc in chemistry. He was first Muslim student to graduate with honors in chemistry from the University of Dhaka. He completed his MSc next year from the University of Dhaka. He completed his PhD in soil sciences from the University of California in 1949.

== Career ==
Islam joined the Soil Science Department of the University of Dhaka as senior lecturer after the completion of his PhD. From 1950 to 1961, he worked for the East Pakistan provincial government as a soil scientist. He carried out a number of important research including classifying the soil of Bangladesh into Seven Soil Tracts. The Seven Soil Tracts is considered the foundation of soil classification in Bangladesh. From 1961 to 1966, he served as the Director of Directorate of Soil Survey. In 1966, he was promoted to the post of Director General. He was appointed Director of Agriculture in 1967. He served as the Director of East Pakistan Rice Research Institute till the Independence of Bangladesh in 1971.

From 1973 to 1977, Islam served as the Director of Bangladesh Rice Research Institute. He served as the Executive Vice-Chairman of the Bangladesh Agricultural Research Council. He retired in 1979 from government service and started working as a free lance consultant. He worked for Centre on Integrated Rural Development for Asia and the Pacific, Food and Agriculture Organization, North Carolina State University, and United Nations Development Programme. He is a Member of Bangladesh Association for the Advancement of Science and Soil Science Society of Bangladesh. He is a fellow of Bangladesh Academy of Sciences.

== Death ==
Islam died on 9 February 2001.
