= Rokeya Rahman Kabeer =

- রোকেয়া রহমান কবির
- Born: 4 October 1925; Kolkata, Bengal Presidency, British India
- Died: 28 July 2000 (aged 74)
- Education: Lady Brabourne College; Presidency College Calcutta

Rokeya Rahman Kabeer (4 October 1925 – 28 July 2000) was a Bangladeshi academic and feminist.

== Early life ==
Kabeer was born on 4 October 1925 in Kolkata, West Bengal in British India. Her father, Mujibur Rahman, was an Indian Civil Service officer. She studied in Loreto Convent, Darjeeling. She graduated from Lady Brabourne College in geography. She completed her master's degree from Presidency College Calcutta in history. She became involved with secular left wing politics in college. She was married to Firoz Kabir, of the famous Kabir family of Faridpur District. Her brother-in-laws were Akbar Kabir, Alamgir Kabir, and Humayun Kabir.

== Career ==
After the Partition of India in 1947, Kabeer left Kolkata, India for East Bengal, Pakistan. She settled in Chittagong where she worked as a school teacher. She afterwards worked as a school teacher in Dhaka. She moved to London, United Kingdom to do a second Masters in history from the University of London. After graduation she joined Eden Girls' College as the chair of the history department. She created an award-winning documentary on the archaeological site in Mainamati. In 1968 she joined Chittagong Girls’ College as its principal. She left for England soon for further studies and returned to Bangladesh in 1976, when she became a full-time activist. She created Saptagram Nari Swanirbhar Parishad in Faridpur to campaign for the rights of women. The organisation by the 1980s had helped thousands of women. She founded the Shoptogram Silk Production Centre which was handed over to Brac in 1999.

== Death and legacy ==
Kabeer died on 28 July 2000. The Rokeya Rahman Kabir Women's Development Centre, named after her, was created to further women's rights in Bangladesh. Her daughter, Naila Kabeer, is a feminist.
