= 2004 Shah Jalal bombing =

Grenade attach in Sylhet, Bangladesh

Coordinates: 24.9023°N 91.8661°E

- Location: Shah Jalal's Dargah, Sylhet, Bangladesh
- Date: 21 May 2004 (UTC+06:00)
- Target: The British High Commissioner to Bangladesh
- Attack type: Mass murder; bomb attack; terrorism
- Deaths: 3 dead
- Injuries: 70
- Perpetrator: Harkat-ul-Jihad al-Islami

2004 Shah Jalal bombing was a terrorist grenade attack on the British High Commissioner to Bangladesh, Anwar Choudhury. The High Commissioner was injured in the attack and two bystanders were killed. The attack was carried out by Harkat-ul-Jihad al-Islami.

== Background ==
The Shah Jalal Shrine is a 700 year old Sufi site located in Sylhet, Bangladesh. Anwar Choudhury, the British High Commissioner went to visit Sylhet which was his ancestral home. He is a Bangladeshi born British Citizen. He visited the shrine on 21 May 2004. He offer prayers at the Shrine and was greeting the people who had come to see him. The shrine was bombed in January of the 2004 which resulted in the death of 5 people.

== Attack ==
The bomb was thrown at the envoy when he was talking with the people present. The bomb hit him on his stomach but did not explode on impact but bounced off and landed near the feet of the Deputy Commissioner where it exploded. Three people including a police personnel were killed in the attack. Anwar Chowdhury was injured in the blast.

== Trial ==
Three men including Mufti Abdul Hannan the leader of Harkat-ul-Jihad-al-Islami Bangladesh were sentenced to death in the case in 2008. The British High Commission welcomed the completion of the trial but opposed the death penalty. The motive for the attack was "to avenge the deaths of Muslims in Iraq and across the world by America and Britain" according to the police. The components of the grenades were traced to Afghanistan. Mufti Abdul Hannan was hanged on 13 April 2017 for his role in the bombing along with two other, Sharif Shahedul Alam Bipul and Delwar Hossain alias Ripon, involved with the attack.

== Reactions ==
- Former British Foreign Secretary Jack Straw issued a statement which said "I am deeply shocked by the news of this bomb and I extend my sympathies to all the victims and their families. "Details of exactly what happened and the nature of the injuries are not clear. We are grateful for the support we are receiving from the Bangladeshi authorities."
- Then Prime Minister of Bangladesh Khaleda Zia condemned the attack and offered her sympathies to the victims.
