= 2001 Ramna Batamul bombings =

Mass murder in Dhaka, Bangladesh

Ramna Batamul bombings
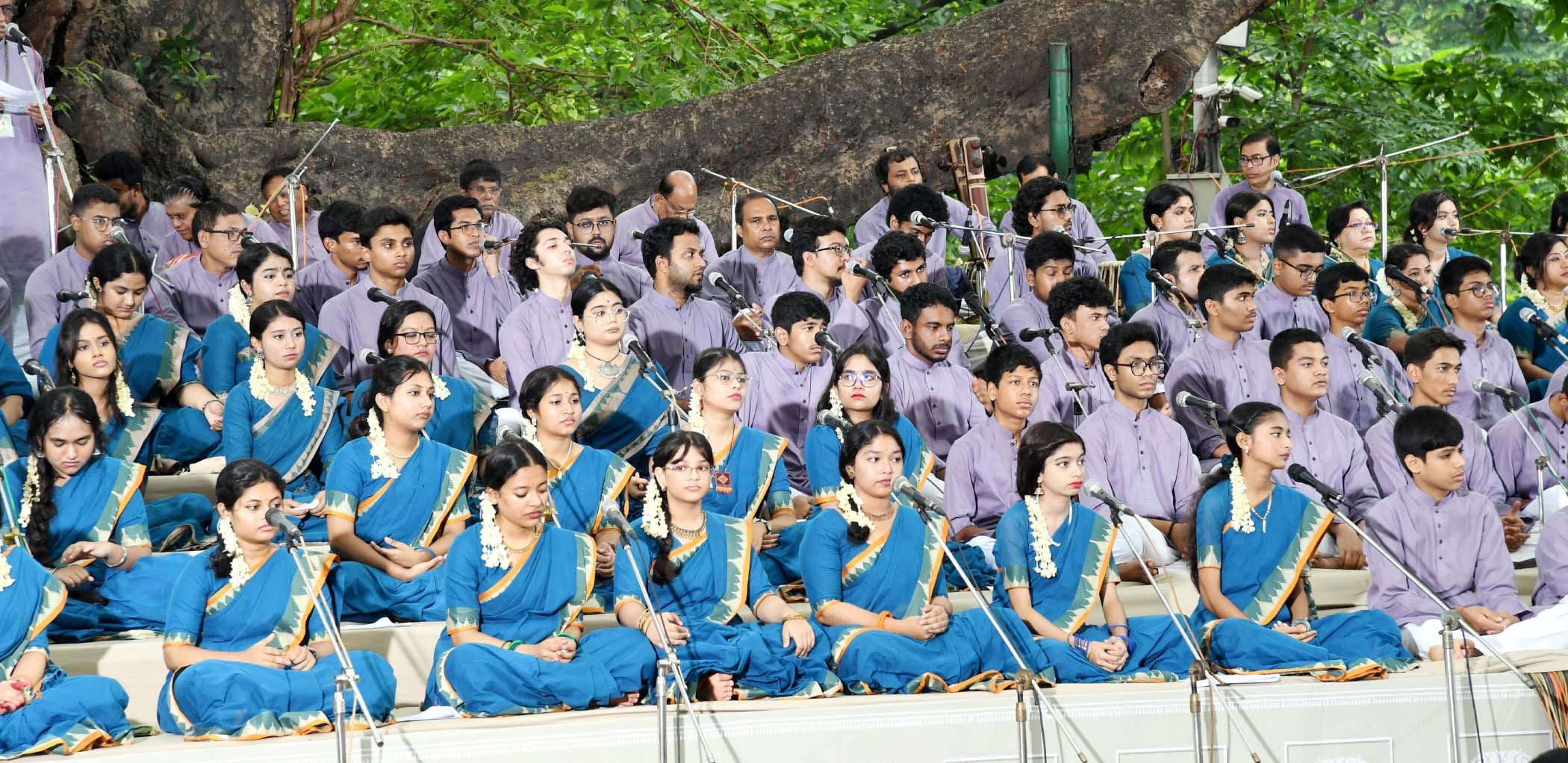
- Pahela Baishakh programme at Ramna Batamul in 2026, where the bomb exploded
- Location: Dhaka, Bangladesh
- Date: 14 April 2001 (UTC+06:00)
- Target: General public celebrating Pohela Boishakh
- Attack type: Mass murder; bomb attack; terrorism
- Deaths: 10
- Perpetrator: Harkat-ul-Jihad al-Islami

The Ramna Batamul bombings were a series of bomb attacks on 14 April 2001 at a cultural programme of the Pahela Baishakh celebrations arranged by Chaayanot, the leading cultural organization of Bangladesh.

Ten people, including Shujan, a Harkat-ul-Jihad al-Islami militant, died, and many more people were wounded. The Islamic fundamentalist group Harkat-ul-Jihad al-Islami later confessed their involvement in the attack.

== Attacks ==
Pohela Boishakh, or Bengali New Year, is the first day of the Bengali calendar. It is celebrated on 14 April in Bangladesh and 15 April in the Indian states of West Bengal as well as Tripura by the Bengali people and by minor Bengali communities in other Indian states, including Assam, Jharkhand and Odisha. On April 14, around 8:00am at Ramna Batamul, the first bomb exploded. Shortly after, there was a second blast when police were conducting evacuations and rescue operations. One policeman was injured in the second bomb explosion. Ten people lost their lives, and about 50 were injured. Police also recovered another inactive bomb later. The state-owned television station BTV was broadcasting the programme live from Ramna Batamul. Because of this, people throughout the country saw the bombing attack on television. Following the incident, all cultural functions organised for New Year celebrations were postponed.

== Trial ==
Two charges were filed by the police with the capital's Ramna police station: one for murder and one for illegal possession of explosives. Eight years after the bomb attack, a court in Dhaka brought charges against Mufti Hannan, chief of banned fundamentalist group Harkat-ul-Jihad al-Islami and 13 others of this group. In 2014, eight of the accused were sentenced to death. Those sentenced included Mufti Hannan, Maulana Akbar Hossain, Arif Hasan Sumon, Maulana Tajuddin, Hafiz Jahangir Alam Badr, Maulana Abu Bakr alias Hafiz Selim Hawladar, Maulana Abdul Hai and Maulana Shafiqur Rahman. The other six, Shahadatullah Jewel, Maulana Sabbir, Shaokat Hossain (alias Sheikh Farid), Maulana Abdur Rauf, Maulana Abu Taher and Maulana Yahia, were sentenced to life in prison.

== Reactions ==
- The Daily Star in an editorial wrote, "This was an attack against the very identity of the nation; it was a blow against the very belief on which the War of Liberation was fought; it was a stab at the very ethos in which we take immense pride, both collectively and as individuals".
