= Shamsur Rahman (poet) =

Bangladeshi poet, writer, journalist (1929 – 2006)

- শামসুর রাহমান
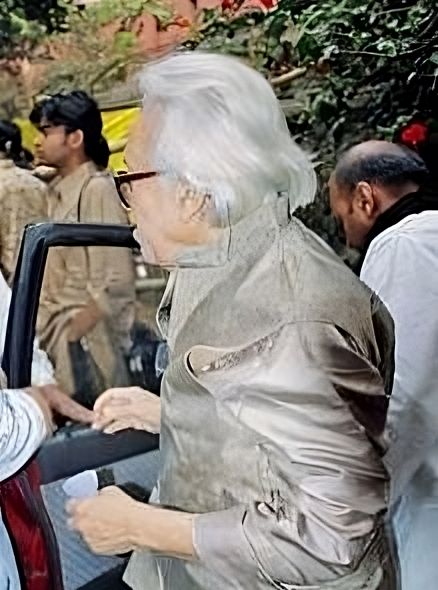
- Rahman at a Bengali Spring Festival event
- Pronunciation: [ʃamsuɾ raɦman]
- Born: 23 October 1929; Dacca, British Bengal
- Died: 17 August 2006 (aged 76); Dhaka, Bangladesh
- Resting place: Banani Graveyard
- Citizenship: Bangladeshi
- Education: MA
- Alma mater: Dhaka College; University of Dhaka
- Occupations: Poet, journalist, columnist
- Writing career
- Language: Bengali
- Genre: Modernist
- Notable awards: Ekushey Padak; Bangla Academy Literary Award

Signature
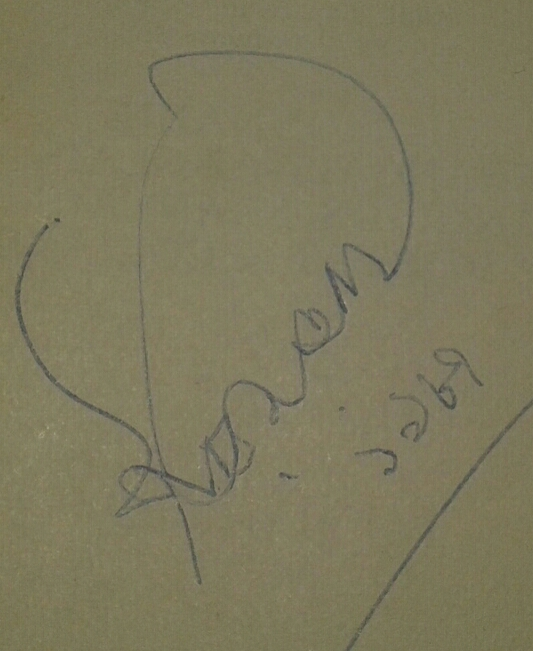

Shamsur Rahman (Note: Bengali: শামসুর রাহমান, Bengali pronunciation: [ʃamsuɾ raɦman].) (Bengali: শামসুর রাহমান, pronounced [ʃamsuɾ raɦman]; 23 October 1929 – 17 August 2006) was a Bangladeshi poet, columnist and journalist. A prolific writer, Rahman produced more than sixty books of poetry collection and is considered a key figure in Bengali literature from the latter half of the 20th century. He was regarded as the unofficial poet laureate of Bangladesh. Major themes in his poetry and writings include liberal humanism, human relations, romanticised rebellion of youth, the emergence of and consequent events in Bangladesh, and opposition to religious fundamentalism.

== Education ==
Shamsur Rahman was born in his grandfather's house 46 no. Mahut-Tuli, Dhaka. His paternal home is situated on the bank of the river Meghna, a village named Paratoli, near the Raipura thana of Narshingdi district. He was the third of thirteen children. His father's name was Mokhlesur Rahman Choudhury and his mother's name was Amena Khatun.

He studied at Pogos High School from where he passed matriculation in 1945. Later he took his I.A. as a student of the Dhaka College. Shamsur Rahman started writing poetry at the age of eighteen, just after graduating from the Dhaka College. He studied English literature at the Dhaka University for three years but did not take the examination. After a break of three years he got admitted to the B.A. pass course and received his BA in 1953. He also received his MA in the same subject where he stood second in second division.

In his leisure after the matriculation, he read the Golpo Guccho of Rabindranath Tagore. He told that this book took him into the extra ordinary world and transformed him into an altogether different personality. In 1949, his poem Unissho Unoponchash was published in Sonar Bangla which was then edited by Nalinikishor Guho.

He had a long career as a journalist and served as the editor of a national daily, Dainik Bangla and the Weekly Bichitra in the 1980s. A shy person by nature, he became an outspoken liberal intellectual in the 1990s against religious fundamentalism and reactionary nationalism in Bangladesh. As a consequence, he became a frequent target of the politically conservative as well as Islamists of the country. This culminated in the January 1999 attack on his life by the militant Harkat-ul-Jihad-al-Islami. He survived the attempt.

== Poetry ==
Shamsur Rahman's first book of poetry, Prothom Gaan Dwityo Mrittyur Agey (First Song Before the Second Death) was published in 1960. He had to go through the political turbulence of the 1960s and 1970s which also reflected in his poems clearly. He wrote his famous poem Asader Shirt which was written with respect to the mass uprising of 1969 led by Maulana Bhasani. During the Bangladesh Liberation War he wrote a number of poems based on the war. These poems were so inspiring that they were recited at the camps of freedom fighters. Later these poems were published in Bondi Shibir Theke (From Confinement in Enemy Territory) in 1972. Later he continued writing poems in the independent Bangladesh and remained as the poet whose poems reflect the history of the nation. During the historical movement against Ershad he published his book Buk Tar Bangladesher Hridoy indicating the great sacrifice of Nur Hossain.

=== Poetic diction ===
Shamsur Rahman wrote most of his poems in free verse, often with the rhythm style known as Poyaar or Okhshorbritto. It is popularly known that he followed this pattern from poet Jibanananda Das. He also wrote poems in two other major patterns of Bengali rhythmic style, namely, Matrabritto and Shwarobritto.

== Career in journalism ==
Shamsur Rahman started his professional career as a co-editor in the English daily Morning News in 1957. Later he left this job and went to the Dhaka center of the then Radio Pakistan. But he returned to his own rank at Morning News in 1960 and was there till 1964. After the liberation of Bangladesh he wrote columns in the daily Dainik Bangla. In 1977 he became the editor of this daily. He also jointly worked as the editor of Bichitra, a weekly published since 1973. During the period of President Ershad he got involved with internal turbulence in the Dainik Bangla. A rank 'Chief Editor' was created to take away his position as the top executive and rip him off all executive powers. In 1987 he left the daily as a protest against this injustice. He also worked as the editor of monthly literary magazine Adhuna for two years since 1986. and as the main editor of the weekly Muldhara in 1989. He worked as one of the editors of Kobikantha, an irregular poetry magazine, in 1956.

== Attempted assassination ==
On 18 January 1999, Harkat-ul-Jihad-al-Islami Bangladesh tried to assassinate Shamsur Rahman in his residence in Shyamali, Dhaka. The attackers tried to decapitate him with an axe and his wife was seriously injured. The attackers were led by Hasan, a student of Dhaka College. He survived the assassination attempt. Charges were filed against seven by Criminal Investigation Department Assistant Superintendent of Police Abdul Kahhar Akhand on 8 July 1999. On 12 February 2004, the accused assassins were acquitted due to a lack of witness by Dhaka's Chief Metropolitan Magistrates Court. Bangladesh police considered re-opening the case in 2016.

== Personal life ==
Rahman married Zohra Begum, daughter of Nabi Baksh and Kudsia Begum. They had three children together.

== Death ==
His health broke down towards the end of the 1990s and on two occasions he received major cardiac surgery. He died on 17 August 2006 of heart and kidney failure after having been in a coma for 12 days. He was 76.

== Critical acclaim ==
Zillur Rahman Siddiqui, a friend and critic, describes Shamsur Rahman as one who is "deeply rooted in his own tradition." In his opinion, Shamsur Rahman "still soaks the language of our times, transcending the limits of geography. In his range of sympathy, his catholicity, his urgent and immediate relevance for us, Shamsur Rahman is second to none."

Professor Syed Manzoorul Islam has similar praise for Rahman, "It is true he has built on the ground of the 30s poets, but he has developed the ground, explored into areas they thought too dark for exploration, has added new features to it, landscaped it and in the process left his footprints all over."

Azfar Hussain also commends Rahman's work thus: "[...] he [Rahman] decisively shapes diction in post-Tagorean and post-Jibananandian Bangla poetry. Also, Rahman offers us the kind of poetry that effectively traverses a wide range of middle-class experiences, while making some politically significant inter-class connections in the interest of animating and inspiring broad-based struggles against oppression and injustice, although his perspective remains inflected by a progressive and robust version of liberal humanism."

In the year 1983, renowned Bangladeshi writer Humayun Azad wrote a book called Shamsur Rahman : Nisshongo Sherpa (A Lonely Climber) that offered a sustained critical analysis of Shamsur Rahman's poetry.

== Tribute ==
On 23 October 2018, Rahman was honoured with a Google Doodle posthumously on his 89th birthday.

== Literary works ==
=== Poetry ===
- Prothom Gan Ditio Mrittur Age (1960)
- Roudro Korotite (1963)
- Biddhosto Nilima (1967)
- Niralokay Dibboroth (1968)
- Neej Bashbhumay (1970)
- Bondi Shibir Theke (1972)
- Dusshom
- Tableay Applegulo Heshe Othay (1986)
- Obirol Jolahromi (1986)
- Amra Kojon Shongi (1986)
- Jhorna Amar Angulay (1987)
- Shopnera Dukray Othay Barbar (1987)
- Khub Beshi Valo Thakte Nei (1987)
- Moncher Majhkhanay (1988)
- Buk Tar Bangladesher Hridoy (1988)
- Matal Hrittik
- Hridoy Amar Prithibir Alo (1989)
- Shay Ak Porobashay(1990)
- Grihojudder Agae(1990)
- Khondito Gourob(1992)
- Dhongsher Kinare Bashay(1992)
- Akash Ashbe Neme(1994)
- Uzar Baganay(1995)
- Asho Kokil Asho Shornochapa
- Manob Hridoy Naibeddo Shajai
- Hemonto Shondhay Kichukal(1997)
- Chayagoner Shonge Kichukkhon
- Meghlokay Monoz(1998)
- Shoundorjo Amar Ghore(1998)
- Ruper Probale Dogdho Shondha(1998)
- Tukro Kichu Shonglaper Shako(1998)
- Shopno O Dushshopnay Bachay Achi(1999)
- Nokkhotro Bajate Bajate(2000)
- Shuni Hridoyer Dhoni(2000)
- Hridopodmay Jotsna Dolay(2001)
- Bhognostupay Golaper Hashi(2002)
- Bhangachora Chand Mukh Kalo Kore Dhukchay(2003)
- Ak Phota kemon Onol(1986)
- Horiner Har(1993)
- Gontobbo Nai Ba Thakuk(2004)
- Krishnopokkhay Purnimar Dikay(2004)
- Gorostanay Kokiler Korun Aaobhan(2005)
- Andhokar Theke Aloy(2006)
- Na Bastob Na Dushshopno(2006)

=== Short stories ===
- Shamsur Rahmaner Golpo

=== Novels ===
- Octopus(1983)
- Adbhut Adhar Ak(1985)
- Niyoti Montaz(1985)
- Elo Je Abelay(1994)

=== Children's literature ===
- Alating Belating(1974)
- Dhan Bhanle Kuro Debo(1977)
- Golap Phote Khukir Hatay(1977)
- Rongdhonur Shako(1994)
- Lal Fulkir Chora(1995)
- Noyonar Jonno(1997)
- Amer Kuri Jamer Kuri(2004)
- Noyonar Jonno(2005)

=== Autobiography ===
- Kaaler Dhuloy Lekha
- Smritir Shohor

=== Collected columns ===
- Akanto Bhaban

=== Poems in translation ===
- Robert Froster Kobita(1966)
- Robert Froster Nirbachito Kobita(1968)
- Khawaja Farider Kobita(1968)

=== Drama in translation ===
- William Shakespeare's Hamlet
- Uzein O'Neeler Markomilions

=== Others ===
- Uponnyash Shomogro
- Noyonar Uddeshe Golap
- Kobitar Shather Gerostali
- Gorosthane Kokiler Korun Ahban
- Nirbachito[SR] 100 Kobita
- Noyonar Jonno Ekti Golap
- Shera Shamsur Rahman
- Rongdhonur Sako
- Shamsur Rahman-er Sreshtha Kobita (1976)
- Premer Kobita (1981)
- Shamsur Rahmaner Sreshtho Kobita (from Kolkata) (1985)
- Shamsur Rahmaner Rajnaitik Kobita (1988)
- Shamsur Rahmaner Premer Kobita (1993)
- Shonirbachito Premer Kobita (1993)
- Nirbachito Chora O Kobita (1996)
- Kabbyashombhar (1996)
- Chorashomogro (1998)
- Prem O Prokitir Kobita (2004)
- Shera Shamsur Rahman (2004)
- Shamsur Rahman Kobita Shongroho (2005)
- Shamsur Rahman Goddo Shongroho (2005)
- Kobita Shomogro Ak (2005)
- Kobtia Shomogro Dui (2006)

== Awards ==
- Adamjee Award (1962)
- Bangla Academy Literary Award (1969)
- Ekushey Padak (1977)
- Swadhinata Dibosh Award (1991)
- Mitshubishi Award of Japan (1992)
- Ananda Puroshker from India (1994).
- TLM South Asian Literature Award for the Masters, 2006.

== Sample work ==
His best known poem, arguably, is a poem written in 1971 during the liberation war in Bangladesh.

স্বাধীনতা তুমি

স্বাধীনতা তুমি রবি ঠাকুরের অজর কবিতা, অবিনাশী গান
স্বাধীনতা তুমি কাজী নজরুল, ঝাঁকড়া চুলের বাবরি দোলানো মহান পুরুষ
সৃষ্টি সুখের উল্লাশে কাঁপা

Shadhinota Tumi

Shadhinota tumi Robi Ţhakurer ôjor kobita, obinashi gan
Shadhinota tumi Kazi Nozrul, jhakŗa chuler babri dolano môhan purush
srishţi-shukher ullashe kãpa ...

Freedom, You

Freedom, you are the immortal poems and songs of Rabindranath
Freedom, you are Kazi Nazrul, the great man with waving unkempt hair,
raptured in your joy of creation ...

the phrase "srishti-sukher ullase" also refers to one of Nazrul's poems "aaj srishti sukher ullase"

Oh Freedom

Freedom, you're
The classic verses of Tagore, timeless lyrics.
Freedom, you're
Kazi Nazrul a great man with thick mane...
