= Mufti Abdul Hannan =

Bangladeshi terrorist

- Born: Hiron village, Kotalipara Upazila, Gopalganj District
- Died: 12 April 2017; Kashimpur Central Jail, Gazipur District, Bangladesh
- Organisation: Harkat-ul-Jihad al-Islami Bangladesh
- Criminal charges: Attempted murder (×2); Terrorism (×2); Murder (×1); Criminal conspiracy (×1); Unlawful possession of explosives (×1)
- Criminal penalty: Death by hanging
- Criminal status: Hanged
- Spouse: Jakia Parvin
- Children: 4 (2 sons, 2 daughters)
- Parents: Nur Islam Munshi (father); Rabeya Begum (mother)

Mufti Abdul Hannan (Bengali: আবদুল হান্নান; died 12 April 2017) was a Bangladeshi Islamist militant, convicted terrorist the former chief of Harkat-ul-Jihad al-Islami Bangladesh (HuJI-B), a banned extremist organization. He played a central role in orchestrating numerous terrorist attacks in Bangladesh between 1999 and 2005, resulting in the deaths of over 100 people. He was sentenced to death by hanging on charges of multiple crimes and executed on 12 April 2017.

== Militancy ==
Hannan is thought to have fought in the Afghan war against the Soviet Union. He trained in Peshawar, Pakistan and spent six months in a seminary in Uttar Pradesh, India. He was the chief of the Bangladeshi branch of Harkat-ul-Jihad al-Islami. He was arrested on 1 October 2005. The charges included, two counts of attempted murder and terrorism for the attempted assassination of Prime Minister Sheikh Hasina in 2000 and a grenade attack on British High Commissioner Anwar Choudhury at Shah Jalal Shrine in 2004. Two counts of murder and conspiracy to commit terrorism for the Ramna Batamul bombing during Bengali New Year in 2001, and a grenade attack on Awami League rally in 21 August 2004. He was also given the charge of unlawful possession of explosives for the bombing of Udichi cultural event at Jessore in 1999.

Hannan was sentenced to death on 23 December 2008, by the Sylhet Divisional Speedy Trial Tribunal for his role in the 2004 grenade attack on British High Commissioner in Sylhet. Additionally, on June 23, 2014, he received another death sentence from a Dhaka court for the 2001 Ramna Batamul bombing, which resulted in 10 deaths. Both sentences were upheld by higher courts.

== Death ==
Hannan was hanged at approximately 10:00 p.m. local time on 12 April 2017 in Kashimpur Prison for the attempt to kill the British High Commissioner through bombing the Shah Jalal Shrine.

== Militant activity ==
- Planned the 1999 bombing of an Udichi Cultural event in Jessore Bangladesh. He admitted his role after his arrest and called the bombing a success.
- Involved in 2001 Ramna Batamul bombings. He was sentenced to death in 2014.
- Indicted in the 2001 bombing of Communist Party of Bangladesh rally.
- Involved in the attempt to kill the British High Commissioner through bombing the Shah jalal shrine. He was sentenced to death.
- Planned 21 August bombing at Awami League rally.
