= Harkat-ul-Jihad al-Islami =

Pakistani Islamist militant organisation

Harakat ul-Jihad al-Islami
- Jihadist flag used by Harkat-ul-Jihad al-Islami
- Founders: Fazlur Rehman Khalil; Qari Saifullah Akhtar †
- Leaders: Ilyas Kashmiri †; Shah Sahib
- Dates active: 1985–present
- Active regions: Pakistan; India; Afghanistan; Bangladesh
- Ideology: Islamism; Islamic fundamentalism Deobandi
- Status: Active
- Size: >400+ (claimed)

Harkat-ul-Jihad-al-Islami (Arabic: حركة الجهاد الإسلامي, romanised: Ḥarkat al-Jihād al-Islāmiyah, lit. 'Islamic Jihad Movement"', HuJI) is a Pakistani Islamic fundamentalist organisation affiliated with al-Qaeda and the Taliban.

It has been most active in the South Asian countries of Pakistan, Bangladesh and India since the early 1990s. The organisation has been designated as a terrorist group by India, Israel, New Zealand, United Kingdom, United States, and Bangladesh when its Bangladesh branch was banned in 2005.

The operational commander of HuJI, Ilyas Kashmiri, was killed in a U.S. drone strike in South Waziristan on 4 June 2011. He was linked to the 13 February 2010 bombing of a German bakery in Pune. A statement was released soon after the attack that claimed to be from Kashmiri; it threatened other cities and major sporting events in India. A local Taliban commander, Shah Sahib, was named as Kashmiri's successor.

== History ==
HuJI or HJI was formed in 1984, during the Soviet–Afghan War, by Fazlur Rehman Khalil and Qari Saifullah Akhtar. Khalil later broke away to form his own group, Harkat-ul-Ansar (HuA), which became a highly feared militant organisation in Kashmir. This group re-formed as Harkat-ul-Mujahideen (HuM) when HuA was blacklisted by the United States in 1997.

HuJI first mainly operated in Afghanistan to fight the Soviets, but after the Soviets retreated, the organisation also started operating in Jammu and Kashmir. HuJI's influence expanded into Bangladesh when the Bangladeshi branch of the organisation was established in 1992, with direct assistance from Osama bin Laden.

== Ideology ==
The organisation, along with other jihadist terrorist groups such as Harkat-ul-Mujahideen, Jaish-e-Mohammed, Al-Qaeda & Lashkar-e-Taiba have similar motivations and goals. Harkat-ul-Jihad al-Islami and Harkat-ul-Mujahideen were both strongly backed by the Taliban and Al-Qaeda and the group professed Taliban-style fundamentalist Islamist ideology. The organisation aims to spread radical Islamist ideology, to take over Kashmir, Afghanistan, Palestine, and the rest of Muslim-majority lands from what it calls "enemies of Islam" and enforce its extremist interpretations of Sharia in all those regions.

== Activities in Bangladesh ==
In the 1990s, HuJI gave recruitment training near the hilly areas of Chittagong and Cox's Bazar. In 1999, members of the organisation attacked Bangladeshi poet Shamsur Rahman. HuJI claimed responsibility for the 2001 Ramna Batamul bombings, where 10 people were killed. It was also the prime suspect in a plot to assassinate former Bangladeshi prime minister Sheikh Hasina in 2000. In 2005, it was officially banned by the government of Bangladesh. HuJI has been condemned by various Islamist groups such as the Hefazat-e-Islam Bangladesh.

In 2008, the founders formed Islamic Democratic Party (IDP) and Abdus Salam was chosen as the leader.

== Activities in India ==
The government of India has declared HuJI a terrorist organisation and banned it. In 2006, the Indian state police Special Task Force uncovered a plot by six HuJI members, including the mastermind of the 2006 Varanasi bombings, involving the destruction of two Hindu temples in Varanasi. Maps of their plans were recovered during their arrest. The organisation has claimed responsibility for blasts at the Delhi High Court that killed 10 people and injured around 60. Vikar Ahmed, a member of an Islamist group connected to HuJI, has been accused of murdering police officers in Hyderabad. He is also a suspect in the Mecca Masjid bombing.

HuJI claimed responsibility for the 2011 Delhi bombing, but this has not been confirmed by the National Investigation Agency. 14 people were killed and 94 injured in the blast. Police have released two sketches of the suspects. HuJI has threatened to target other Indian cities.

== Designation as a terrorist organisation ==
Country	Date	References
United Kingdom	14 October 2005	
India	29 December 2004	
Bangladesh	17 October 2005	
Israel	2005	
New Zealand	15 December 2010	
United States	6 August 2010	

On 6 August 2010, the United Nations designated Harakat-ul Jihad al-Islami a foreign terror group and blacklisted its commander, Ilyas Kashmiri. State Department counterterrorism coordinator Daniel Benjamin said this demonstrated the global community's resolve to counter the group's threat. "The linkages between HUJI and Al-Qaeda are clear, and today's designations convey the operational relationship between these organisations", he said.

== Militant attacks claimed by or attributed to HuJI ==
Date	Country	Description
1999	Bangladesh	Failed attempt to assassinate the humanist poet Shamsur Rahman
2000	Bangladesh	Alleged failed scheme to assassinate the Prime Minister of Bangladesh Sheikh Hasina
14 April 2001	Bangladesh	Pahela Baishakh attack on Ramna Batamul
January 2002	India	Terror attack near the American Centre in Kolkata, executed in collaboration with the Dawood-linked mafioso Aftab Ansari
2003	India	Role in assassination of the former Gujarat Home Minister Haren Pandya.
2004	Bangladesh	2004 Dhaka grenade attack attempt to assassinate Sheikh Hasina
2005	India	Suicide bombing of the headquarters of the Andhra Pradesh Police's counter-terrorism Special Task Force. A Bangladeshi national, Mohatasin Bilal, had carried out the bombing
June 2005	India	Bombing of the Delhi-Patna Shramjeevi Express at Jaunpur
March 2006	Varanasi, Uttar Pradesh, India	Bombing of the Sankat Mochan temple, which was traced to HuJI's Bangladesh-based cells
25 August 2007	Hyderabad, Andhra Pradesh, India	25 August 2007 Hyderabad bombings (suspected, but no evidence revealed as of early September)
13 May 2008	Jaipur, Rajasthan, India	13 May 2008 Jaipur bombings (suspected; evidence pending.)
25 July 2008	Bangalore, India	2008 Bengaluru serial blasts (suspected; evidence pending.)
26 July 2008	Ahmadabad, India	2008 Ahmedabad serial blasts (suspected; evidence pending.)
13 September 2008	Delhi, India	2008 Delhi serial blasts (suspected; evidence pending.)
20 September 2008	Islamabad, Pakistan	2008 Marriott Hotel bombing (claimed by HuJI; evidence pending.)
1 October 2008	Agartala, Tripura, India	2008 Agartala bombings (HuJI suspected; evidence pending.)
30 October 2008	Guwahati, Barpeta, Kokrajhar, Bongaigaon, India	2008 Assam bombings (HuJI suspected; evidence pending.)
13 February 2010	Pune, India	2010 Pune bombing (HuJI suspected)
7 September 2011	New Delhi, India	2011 Delhi bombing (claimed by HuJI; evidence pending.)

== See also ==
- List of designated terrorist groups
