= Manusher Jonno Foundation =

Bangladeshi human rights organization

- Formation: 2002
- Headquarters: Dhaka, Bangladesh
- Region served: Bangladesh
- Official language: Bengali
- Website: manusherjonno.org

Manusher Jonno Foundation is a Bangladeshi human rights organization that works with marginalized communities. Shaheen Anam is the executive director of Manusher Jonno Foundation. It operates in 53 districts, has provided assistance to 3 million people, and prevent more than six thousand child marriages.

== History ==
Manusher Jonno Foundation started in 2002 as a project of CARE Bangladesh, the national unit of CARE International. The Foundation was established to promote human rights and good governance in Bangladesh.

Manusher Jonno Foundation organized a seminar on human rights of Dalits in 2008 where Dr Kamal Hossain spoke.

In 2010, Manusher Jonno Foundation signed an agreement for support with Norwegian Ambassador Ingebjorg Stofring. It asked the government of Bangladesh to establish a Leave No One Behind Fund that would benefit workers in the informal sector. It spoke against using children as props in political programs. In December 2014, the foundation honored 10 local defenders of human rights in Bangladesh.

Manusher Jonno Foundation studied the impacts of patriarchy on indigenous tribal communities in 2015.

During the COVID-19 pandemic in Bangladesh, the foundation arranged financial support to 23000 families. It arranged a discussion on Sector-Wide Impact Assessment on Coastal Small Fishers with The Daily Star in April 2021. In October, multiple cases were filed against Shaheen Anam, executive director of Manusher Jonno Foundation and wife of Mahfuz Anam, and Angela Gomes, the executive director of Banchte Shekha, for hurting the sentiments of Hindu people after speaking out against the Hindu family law of Bangladesh.

== Board of directors ==
- Syed Manzur Elahi
- Shaheen Anam
- Mizanur Rahman
- Shahnaz Huda
- Anisatul Fatema Yousuf
- Nirupa Dewan
- Parveen Mahmud
- Md. Golam Samdani Fakir
- Salahuddin M. Aminuzzaman
