= Simeen Rahman =

Bangladeshi business executive (born 1973)

- সিমিন রহমান
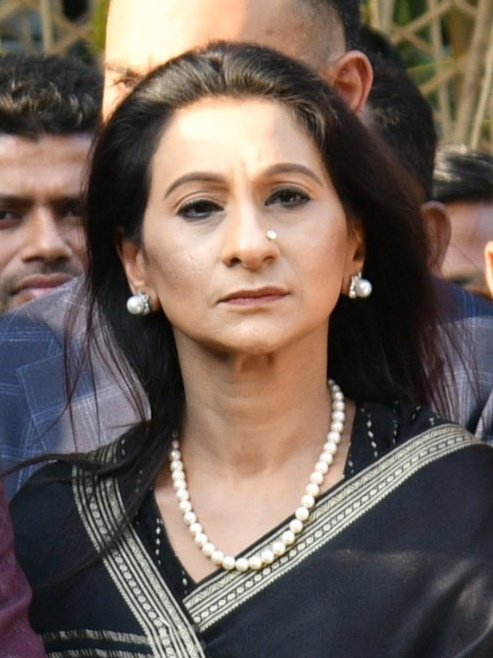
- Simeen Rahman in 2026
- Born: 1973 (age 52–53); Dhaka, Bangladesh
- Occupation: Business executive
- Known for: Leadership of Transcom Group, growth of Eskayef Pharmaceuticals
- Title: Group CEO, Transcom Group
- Children: 2, including Faraaz Ayaaz Hossain
- Parents: Latifur Rahman (father); Shahnaz Rahman (mother)
- Relatives: Shazneen Tasnim Rahman (sister)
- Awards: Forbes Asia's Power Businesswomen (2021)

Simeen Hossain née Rahman (born 1973) is a Bangladeshi business executive. She is the Group Chief Executive Officer (CEO) of Transcom Group, one of Bangladesh's largest conglomerates. As the eldest daughter of the late industrialist Latifur Rahman, she took over the leadership of the group following his death in 2020.

Rahman is widely credited with transforming Eskayef Pharmaceuticals Limited into one of the country's leading pharmaceutical companies during her tenure as Managing Director. In 2021, Forbes Asia named her in its "Asia's Power Businesswomen" list, recognizing her leadership and contributions to the business landscape.

== Early life and education ==
Simeen Rahman was born in Dhaka, Bangladesh, to Latifur Rahman, founder of Transcom Group, and Shahnaz Rahman. She is the second of their four children, after Arshad Waliur Rahman (1965-2023). She completed her higher education in the United States, earning a degree from a US university before returning to Bangladesh to join the family business.

== Career ==
Rahman began her career within the Transcom Group, taking on a leadership role at a young age. Her most significant early achievement was her stewardship of Eskayef Pharmaceuticals Limited, which Transcom Group had acquired from Smith, Kline & French. As Managing Director, she oversaw a period of rapid growth, focusing on innovation, quality control, and expansion into international markets. Under her leadership, Eskayef became the first Bangladeshi company to have its manufacturing facility approved by the UK's Medicines and Healthcare products Regulatory Agency (MHRA).

After the death of her father in July 2020, Rahman was appointed Group CEO of Transcom in February 2021, taking on the responsibility of managing the diverse portfolio of the conglomerate, which includes pharmaceuticals, beverages, electronics, media, and food services. She also serves as the head of several key subsidiaries within the group.

Rahman holds director and management positions in the following companies:

- Transcom Ltd. (Group CEO)
- Eskayef Pharmaceuticals Ltd. (Managing Director & CEO)
- Transcom Distribution Company Ltd. (Managing Director)
- Transcom Consumer Products Ltd. (Managing Director)
- Mediastar Ltd. (Director)
- Mediaworld Ltd. (Director)
- Bangladesh Lamps Ltd. (Director)

In early 2024, Rahman became involved in a widely reported legal dispute with her mother and siblings over the inheritance and ownership of shares within the Transcom Group following her father's death.

== Awards and recognition ==
- Asia's Power Businesswomen by Forbes Asia (2021): In recognition of her success in leading Transcom through the challenges of the COVID-19 pandemic and her transformative work at Eskayef.
- Mother Teresa Memorial International Award for Social Justice (2016): Accepted on behalf of her deceased son, Faraaz Ayaaz Hossain, for his bravery during the 2016 Gulshan attack.

== Personal life ==
Simeen Rahman is the eldest daughter of Latifur and Shahnaz Rahman. Her siblings are the late Shazneen Tasnim Rahman, Shahzreh Huq, and the late Arshad Waliur Rahman.

Her family has endured multiple tragedies. In 1998, her younger sister, Shazneen, was raped and murdered at their home in Dhaka. In July 2016, her son, Faraaz Ayaaz Hossain, was killed by terrorists in the 2016 Gulshan attack at the Holey Artisan Bakery. Faraaz was posthumously honored for his courage and friendship, and his memory is preserved through the Faraaz Hossain Foundation and the annual Faraaz Hossain Courage Award.

Her elder son is Zaraif Ayaat Hossain.
