= Shahnaz Huda =

Shahnaz Huda is a law professor at the University of Dhaka. She is the former chairman of the Department of Law of the University of Dhaka. She is a member of the Police Reform Commission of the Muhmmad Yunus led interim government of Bangladesh.

== Early life and education ==
Huda graduated from Viqarunnisa Noon School and College in 1978 and Holy Cross College, Dhaka in 1980. She finished her bachelors and masters in law at the University of Dhaka in 1984 and 1985 respectively. She earned her PhD in 1996 at the University of East London. Her thesis was “Born to be Wed: Bangladeshi Women and the Formation of the Muslim Marriage Contract”. She completed her post-doctoral research at the School of Oriental and African Studies of the University of London.

== Career ==
Huda joined the law faculty of the University of Dhaka in 1989.

In 2011, Huda published Combating Gender Injustice: Hindu Law in Bangladesh, a textbook for law schools in Bangladesh. She is the Director of the Centre for Advanced Legal Studies (CALS). She recommend banning Fatwa. In 2012, she signed a statement calling the government of Bangladesh to leave Grameen Bank alone. She signed a statement critical of a High Court Division order that called for sedition charges against Asif Nazrul over comments he made on a television channel where he warned another 1/11 situation might happen due to the political crisis in the country.

According to Huda in 2015, Bangladeshi law does not allow Muslims to adopt children only Hindu males are allowed to adopt. She presided over a symposium organized by the Bangladesh Institute of Law and International Affairs on "Revisiting Divorce and other Related Issues" in 2016. She signed a statement calling for withdrawal of cases against Mahfuz Anam, editor of The Daily Star.

In 2019, Huda condemned the Murder of Abrar Fahad as an attack on free speech. In 2021, she signed a statement calling for the release of Rozina Islam. She is an executive member of Shushashoner Jonno Nagorik. She called on the government to allow former Prime Minister Khaleda Zia to travel abroad for medical treatment. In 2022, she called on the government to renew registration of Odhikar. In January and February 2024, she protested attempts to harass Muhmmad Yunus by the government of Bangladesh. After the fall of the Sheikh Hasina led Awami League government, she was appointed member of the Police Reform Commission.

== Bibliography ==
- Revisiting Personal Laws in Bangladesh: Proposals for Reform (co-editors Faustina Pereira and Sara Hossain)
