= Rozina =

Rozina may refer to:

== People ==
- Rozina (Bangladeshi actress) (born 1955)
- Rozina (Pakistani actress) (born 1950)
- Rozina Ali (born 1967), English surgeon and consultant
- Rozina Cambos (1951–2012), Israeli actress
- Rozina Islam, Bangladeshi journalist
- Rozina Nazish, Indian politician
- Rozina Pátkai (born 1978), Hungarian singer
- Rozina Tufail, Pakistani politician

== Places ==
- Rožina, a village in Serbia
- Rozina, a district of Želiezovce, Slovakia

== See also ==
- Rozina, the Love Child, a 1945 Czechoslovak drama film
