= Mahbub Anam =

Bangladeshi journalist and writer

- মহবুব আনাম
- Born: 28 March 1931
- Died: 9 July 2001 (aged 70)
- Children: Iftekhar Anam (son)
- Parent: Abul Mansur Ahmed (father)
- Relatives: Mahfuz Anam (brother)

Mahbub Anam (28 March 1931 – 9 July 2001) was a Bangladeshi journalist and writer. He was the editor of The Bangladesh Times.

== Early life ==
Anam's father Abul Mansur Ahmed was a satirist and politician of Bengal. His younger brother Mahfuz Anam is the editor of The Daily Star. Anam was actively involved in politics from his student life. He was the general secretary of Salimullah Muslim Hall of Dhaka University in 1954-55 and was appointed acting publications secretary of the Jukta Front on behalf of the Awami League in 1954.

== Career ==
Anam also served as the general manager of Jamuna Oil Company and the director of Bangladesh Petroleum Corporation.

Anam served as the president of the Nattyamancho Bangladesh and Bangladesh Sahitya Sangskriti Kendro and was involved with Bangladesh Film Censor Board and Bangladesh Public Library Special Committee.

He was elected to parliament from Mymensingh-7 as a Bangladesh Nationalist Party candidate in 15 February 1996 Bangladeshi general election.

== Works ==
Anam wrote Amra Bangladeshi Amra Bangalee and Itihasher Shikriti Bonam Bikriti.

== Awards ==
- Bhasha Andoloner Bir Sainik Padak by the then president Ziaur Rahman
- Matribhasha Padak by Tamaddun Majlish
- Independence Day Award
- Sher-e-Bangla Gold Medal
- Moulana Akram Khan Gold Medal
- Kaloddhani Padak
- Tribhuj Gold Medal
