= Mahfuz Anam =

Bangladeshi journalist

- মাহফুজ আনাম
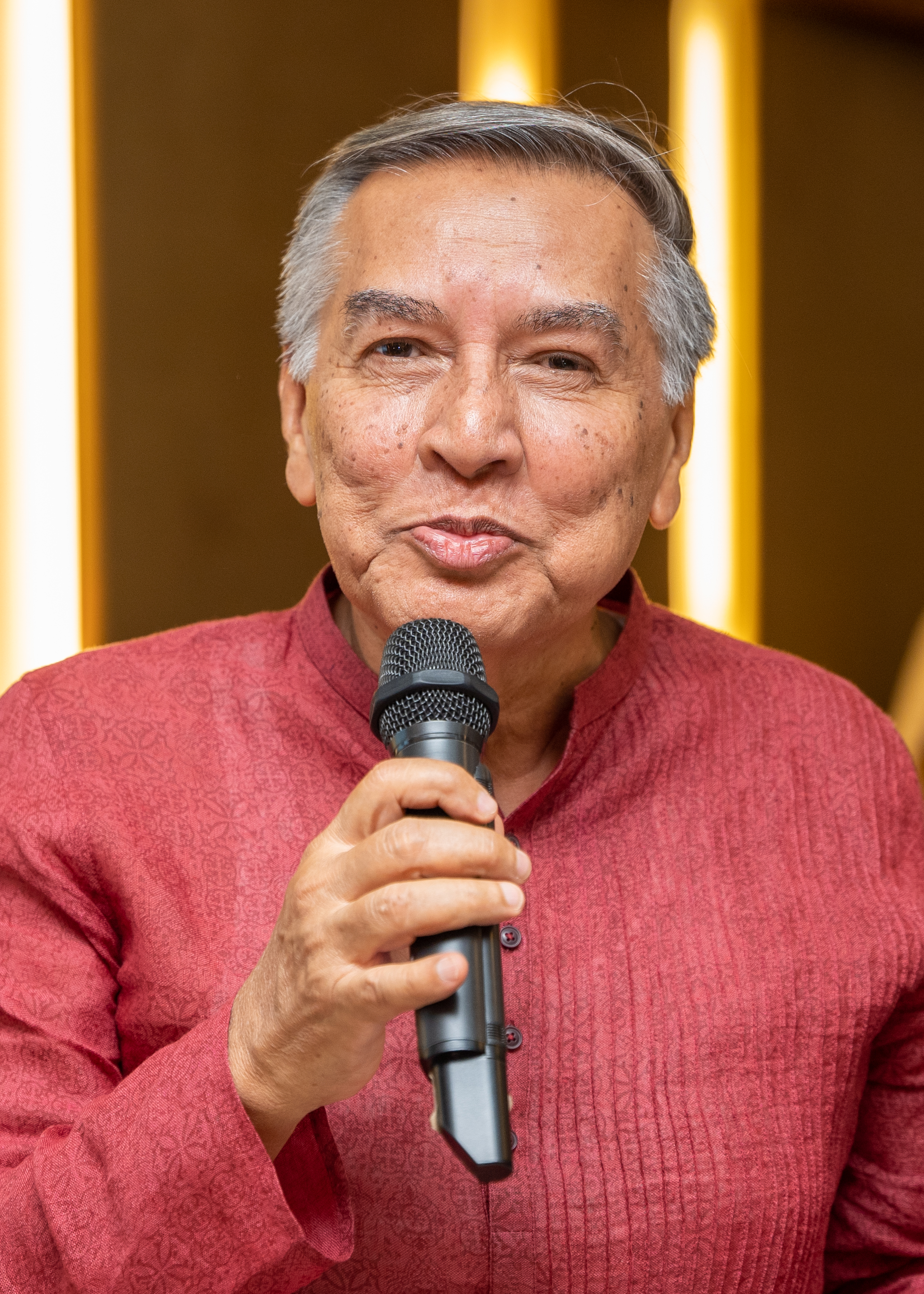
- Anam in 2023
- Born: June 18, 1950 (age 76); Mymensingh, East Bengal, Dominion of Pakistan
- Education: University of Dhaka (MA)
- Occupations: Journalist, editor and publisher
- Known for: Editor of The Daily Star
- Spouse: Shaheen Anam
- Children: Tahmima Anam (daughter)
- Parent: Abul Mansur Ahmed (father)
- Relatives: Mahbub Anam (brother)

Mahfuz Anam (Bengali: মাহফুজ আনাম; born 18 June 1950) is a Bangladeshi journalist and public intellectual. He is the editor and publisher of The Daily Star, which is the largest English newspaper in the country. He was elected chairman of the Asia News Network in 2007, 2022 and 2023. He is also the founder of the Newspapers Owners Association of Bangladesh.

== Early life ==
Anam was born in 1950 in Mymensingh, East Bengal, Dominion of Pakistan. Anam is the youngest son of Abul Mansur Ahmed, a lawyer, writer and politician who worked for the emancipation of Bengali Muslims. In the first half of the 20th century, his father was a reputed newspaper editor and political satirist in British India. During the 1950s, his father was vice president of Awami League between 1953 and 1958, provincial minister of education in the United Front cabinet in 1954, and central minister of commerce and industries in the cabinet of Huseyn Shaheed Suhrawardy, the fifth Prime Minister of Pakistan, between 1956 and 1957. Anam studied at Notre Dame College in Dhaka. He studied economics in the University of Dhaka, where one of his teachers was Rehman Sobhan. Anam won the All Pakistan Debating Championship for three consecutive years in 1967, 1968 and 1969. The debate championships were held in Karachi, Dhaka and Lahore. As a student, Anam attended political rallies, including the 7th March Speech of Sheikh Mujibur Rahman. In 1971, Anam campaigned for the independence of East Pakistan. He joined the Mukti Bahini in the final months of the Bangladesh War of Independence.

== Career ==
=== The Bangladesh Observer ===
Mahfuz Anam began his career in March 1972. He worked as a staff correspondent of The Bangladesh Observer, the country's main English-language daily at the time. He later served as assistant editor of The Bangladesh Times. Both newspapers were taken over by the state under BAKSAL in 1975. He was awarded the Thomas Jefferson Fellowship in Journalism in 1976 by the East-West Center.

=== United Nations ===
Between 1977 and 1990, Anam worked for UNESCO as a media officer and spokesman. He was posted in Paris, New York City and Bangkok. In his last posting in Bangkok, Anam served as UNESCO's Regional Media and Public Affairs Representative.

=== The Daily Star ===
While in Bangkok, Anam planned to set up a newspaper in Bangladesh with Syed Mohammad Ali, the former editor of The Bangkok Post. They secured funding from investors Azimur Rahman, A. S. Mahmud, Latifur Rahman, A. Rouf Chowdhury and Shamsur Rahman. In Anam's words, "The paper was a while in the making. It started in the 80s, with the frantic exchange of letters between S. M. Ali, based in Kuala Lumpur, and myself, based in Bangkok, both working for UNESCO. The plan was that he would retire, in 1988, and I would resign, in 1990, and both of us would return to Bangladesh and launch our paper. The two-year advance presence of Ali Bhai coupled with my frequent visits from Bangkok, sometimes once every month, gave us the chance to finalise investments (with Mahmud Bhai [A S Mahmud], our founding managing director, acting as the catalyst), finalise our plans for the paper, wrap up major recruitments, rent the premises, and most importantly, get the 'declaration'—the official permission to start a newspaper".

The Daily Star was founded during Bangladesh's transition to parliamentary democracy in 1991. The period coincided with economic liberalization reforms. The newspaper quickly gained popularity in the capital Dhaka and the port city of Chittagong. It became the largest circulating English-language daily in the country, out-beating rivals like The Bangladesh Observer and Holiday. Its editorial views became highly influential. It emerged as a symbol of Bangladesh's outspoken, diverse and privately owned press which flourished between 1990 and the late 2000s. According to the BBC, "The Daily Star is the most popular English-language newspaper in Bangladesh. It was launched as Bangladesh returned to parliamentary democracy a quarter of a century ago, and has always had a reputation for journalistic integrity and liberal and progressive views – a kind of Bangladeshi New York Times". After S. M. Ali's death in 1993, Anam began leading the journalistic operations of the newspaper. The newspaper's parent company Mediaworld Ltd appointed Anam as publisher in 1998. Anam worked closely with Syed Fahim Munaim, who was the newspaper's Managing Editor and responsible for revenue matters.

=== NOAB and other bodies ===
Anam is the founding president of the Newspapers Owners Association of Bangladesh (NOAB). He also served as Secretary-General of the Editors Council of Bangladesh. Anam was elected chairman of the Asia News Network (ANN) in Seoul in 2007. Anam is a member of the Board of Trustees of the Bangladeshi chapter of Transparency International (TIB).

Anam worked with the Ford Foundation and Professor Rehman Sobhan to establish the Bangladesh Freedom Foundation.

== Views ==
Anam has been described as a libertarian. In foreign policy, Anam supports improving relations with India. In 2010, Anam delivered a keynote speech on "Why China should be interested in Bangladesh?", which discussed Bangladesh's economic growth and trade relations with Beijing.

=== Battle of Begums (1990-2006) ===
During the 1990s, Anam interviewed key political figures, including erstwhile leader of the opposition Sheikh Hasina. Anam challenged the prevailing censorship at the time surrounding Sheikh Mujibur Rahman. After Anam decided to publish a photo of Mujib on the front page on 15 August 1991 (Mujib's death anniversary), 25 members of staff resigned in protest. When the Awami League was elected in 1996, Anam wrote that "those who once considered us their favourite felt outraged and betrayed", with AL leaders lodging complaints about Anam to the director of the company.

During the premiership of Khaleda Zia between 2001 and 2006, Anam faced defamation lawsuits from ruling BNP leaders. He was co-accused with Matiur Rahman, editor of the Bengali newspaper Prothom Alo. Anam's lawyer was Kamal Hossain. Anam was also found to be in contempt of court for reporting that a recently appointed judge had falsified his academic credentials; the court action had been filed by the judge's father.

=== 1/11 emergency (2007-2008) ===
During the 2006–2008 Bangladeshi political crisis, Anam openly criticized the army chief despite restrictions on press freedom under a state of emergency. In response to General Moeen U Ahmed's suggestions for a Bangladeshi brand of democracy, Anam wrote "On the questions of the Chief of Army Staff's idea of 'having our own brand of democracy' we want to point out that our first brush with a General in politics was with Ayub Khan back in 1958 and he wanted to 'reinvent democracy according to the genius of the people' and we ended up having 'basic democracy' that was thoroughly rejected by our people, though it took a while. Much later in Pakistan came General Zia-ul-Huq who also wanted to redefine democracy. His was quite a clever ploy and very original. In order to deprive the Pakistanis of exercising their right to elect a government Zia said 'I cannot accept democracy where sovereignty belongs to the people. In my book sovereignty only belongs to Allah'. So Zia-ul-Huq ran Pakistan under his personal fiat, as accepting the sovereignty of the people was against his belief. Ask any Pakistani for the great and irreparable damage he had caused to their country". Indian columnist Kuldip Nayar referred to Anam's piece in Outlook regarding Ayub Khan's views on the "genius of the people". Anam's article was written amid fears of a direct military takeover in Bangladesh; the army chief later ruled out any possibility of grabbing power.

One of Anam's most influential articles was "This is no way to strengthen democracy", which he wrote in response to Sheikh Hasina's detention by the military-backed caretaker government in 2007. In the article, he stated "We trust the chief of staff when he says that the Army is not involved in politics or forming any new party. But what do we do when we receive reports from our correspondents that district administrators are making lists of so-called clean politicians and that many of them are being visited by the powers that be goading them to join the new so-called king's party? What do we do when senior leaders of both the BNP and the AL tell us of powerful visitors asking them to move against their party leaders or face corruption charges? We would like to strongly suggest that this is no way to strengthen democracy. Just as 'command economy' failed so will 'command politics'. The core of democracy is people's right to choose their leaders and those who will represent them in the government".

Anam is traditionally seen as a defender of the values of democracy which inspired Bangladesh's independence movement. There has been speculation about Anam's political ambitions. Anam was involved in creating a citizens' platform with Nobel laureate Muhammad Yunus. Yunus tried to form a political party called Nagorik Shakti (Citizen Power).

=== Sheikh Hasina (2009-2024) ===
During Sheikh Hasina's authoritarian premiership from 2009 to 2024, Anam faced as many as 83 lawsuits, including 68 counts of criminal defamation and claims worth millions of dollars; as well as 16 sedition cases. The lawsuits against Anam were criticized by PEN America.

Anam criticized the Awami League for fascism after the fall of Sheikh Hasina. Anam described his newspaper's policy in resisting Sheikh Hasina's authoritarian drift, stating:

We always supported democracy and free and fair election. We strongly opposed the abolition of the caretaker government system and wrote editorials and post-editorials criticising the move. On 2nd July 2011, after the abolition of the caretaker government system, we wrote -- may be the only paper doing so -- an editorial titled "It's a mistake". We opposed the 15th amendment and various provisions incorporated in it. When BNP decided to boycott the 2014 election, we urged the government to postpone the polls to allow more dialogue to have BNP and Jamaat participate. We strongly criticised the election of 2014, editorially stating that it was "All for an empty victory" and that an election that produces 153 uncontested MPs of a house of 300 members cannot but be a sham. We again criticised the ruling party for the absence of a level playing field in 2018. The 2024 election was totally one-sided and not one that can be accepted as an expression of public will. We questioned the role of the Election Commission in all three elections. We never gave any element of credibility to these controversial and clearly questionable elections. We always condemned custodial deaths, extrajudicial killings, enforced disappearances and all forms of torture. Our editorials and post-editorials always opposed such actions. We demanded judicial inquiries and criticised the impunity enjoyed by RAB and "encounter deaths" that were associated with its activities. The Daily Star relentlessly wrote against all repressive laws. When the Digital Security Act was passed, our editorials condemned it outright. Every time a journalist or a citizen was arrested, we never failed to protest. This newspaper took active part in organising the protests by the Sampadak Parishad and conducted constant campaigns for press freedom. Throughout the 15 years of Sheikh Hasina's repressive rule, The Daily Star was a target of misinformation, false accusations, intimidation, and partisan talks shows that tried to mislead the public with false narratives.

Anam protested the closure of a pro-opposition newspaper in 2010 by referring to Voltaire. In 2021, Anam took a neutral stand over the controversy surrounding the Al Jazeera documentary All the Prime Minister's Men. Censorship in Bangladesh meant there was little coverage of the scandalous accusations in the documentary. Anam called it "not a top-class work of investigative journalism". Anam also wrote a column openly addressed to army chief General Aziz Ahmed. Anam blasted General Ahmed who suggested that criticizing the army chief was tantamount to criticizing the Prime Minister.

Despite earlier libertarian views, Anam appeared to cautiously welcome the Fall of Kabul in 2021 and the Taliban takeover of Afghanistan. He described the situation as a defeat for the United States. In spite of Hasina accusing Anam of colluding with the World Bank to stop the Padma Bridge project, Anam called the completion of the bridge's construction Sheikh Hasina's "finest hour". At the same time, his newspaper has faced pressure from the Bangladesh government and intelligence agencies. Anam's newspaper suffered a 40% drop in revenue due to the Hasina administration withholding adverts from government departments. 50 firms were blocked from advertising in The Daily Star, including local and multinational companies. The ban on government adverts, which are a key source of revenue, was eventually lifted. Anam's newspaper had to work within the confines of censorship during Sheikh Hasina's premiership, including under draconian legislation like the Digital Security Act and Cyber Security Act. In the run up to the 2024 Bangladeshi general election, Anam wrote a critical piece which was satirically titled "Towards a 'free and fair election', indeed".

In 2016, Anam recalled that "many Awami League ministers and leaders publicly "walked out" of The Daily Star's 25th anniversary programme, because Prof Yunus was present there as the chief guest. They accused this paper and its editor of trying to "resurrect" an "enemy of Bangladesh", and also trying to "launch" the Nobel laureate into the public sphere again". Yunus became the chief adviser of Bangladesh after the fall of Sheikh Hasina. Anam interviewed Yunus in November 2024 during which Yunus remarked "We (interim government) are only facilitators, not rulers".

== Criticism ==
Sheikh Hasina's son Sajeeb Wazed called Anam "completely unethical" and "a liar". David Bergman, who worked at The Daily Star, is also critical of Anam for his views on the Padma Bridge graft scandal. In 2016, speaking at a panel discussion on ATN News, Anam conceded that reports published in The Daily Star in 2007 alleging corruption by Prime Minister Sheikh Hasina were based on uncorroborated leaks fed by the military's Directorate General of Forces Intelligence. "It was a big mistake," he said during the interview and stated that "It was a bad editorial judgement, I admit it without any doubt".

According Sheikh Hasina's son, "the publication of false news reports by Mahfuz Anam, the editor of The Daily Star, led to the arrest of my mother, and she had to spend 11 months in jail. I want justice, I want to see Mahfuz Anam arrested and tried for sedition". Anam's newspaper has also been criticized for potential defamation of Khaleda Zia's son and BNP leader Tarique Rahman who was accused, convicted and acquitted in the 2004 Dhaka grenade attack case. Anam himself has noted a common perception that his newspaper is partisan towards the Awami League, which he claims is false. One former journalist at his newspaper spoke of arbitrary censorship.

In December 2024, Simin Rahman of Transcom Group was accused by his younger sister of embezzling her deceased father's shares through non-judicial stamp fraud. On 18 May 2025, Elias Hossain's YouTube investigative report program called Fifteen Minutes was shown, stating that Simin Rahman was unethically assisted by Prothom Alo editor Matiur Rahman and Daily Star's Mahfuz Anam in this matter, and Asif Nazrul dismissed the case without investigation due to his good relations with them. Zulkarnain Saer Khan also criticised Matiur Rahman and Mahfuz Anam for involving in this matter. Matiur Rahman and Mahfuz Anam also helped Simin giving advice to donate on making bollywood film Faraaz with a false narrative to hide the information about his son Faraz being a militant in 2016 Dhaka Holey Artisan attack, instead showing him as a saviour hero.

== Family ==
Anam's wife, Shaheen Anam runs a non-governmental organization called Manusher Jonno Foundation (For the People Foundation). Anam's eldest daughter Tahmima Anam is a Bangladeshi English-language novelist and a recipient of the Commonwealth Writer's Prize. Anam's older brother Mahbub Anam was the editor of The Bangladesh Times and a Member of Parliament from the Bangladesh Nationalist Party (BNP).

== Awards ==
- Courageous Journalism Award, 2016 – East-West Center
