= Awaz.bd =

Bangladeshi platform for anonymous accounts of childhood sexual abuse

- Founded: 7 September 2026
- Founder: Rakibul Hasan, Salahuddin Jahangir
- Type: Online platform
- Legal status: Private
- Official language: Bengali, English
- Website: https://awaz.bd/

Awaz.bd is a Bangladeshi online platform where users can anonymously share experiences of childhood sexual abuse. It was launched on 7 September 2026 by Rakibul Hasan and Salahuddin Jahangir. The platform aggregates voluntary, crowdsourced submissions to compile statistics on reported incidents, tracking metrics such as the victim's age, gender, and incident location. Because submissions are voluntary and self-reported, the compiled data is not statistically representative of child sexual abuse at the national level.

== Purpose and operations ==
Awaz.bd was established to document childhood sexual abuse in Bangladesh, including incidents within educational institutions. The site allows individuals to submit testimonies of abuse without providing identifying information.

Although the initiative initially focused on reports from male victims, it later expanded to accept submissions regarding female victims. The founders stated that the platform serves strictly an informational and documentation role, and does not conduct independent investigations or provide legal assistance.

== Statistics ==
Awaz.bd received 45 submissions during its first 24 hours, according to Daily Prothom Alo.

Of the first 124 submissions, 53% concerned boys and 47% concerned girls. The largest share involved children aged 10 to 12. The home was the reported location in 49% of the submissions, while 33% were associated with religious or educational institutions.

Among the submissions associated with religious or educational institutions, Qawmi madrasas accounted for the largest number.

By 18 September 2026, 10 days after the platform was launched, 173 accounts had been published, according to Bangla Stream.

== See also ==
- Child sexual abuse
- Sexual abuse
- Child protection
