= Shazneen Tasnim Rahman murder =

1998 rape and murder in Dhaka, Bangladesh

Murder of Shazneen Tasnim Rahman
- Location: Gulshan, Dhaka, Bangladesh
- Date: 23 April 1998
- Attack type: Rape, child murder, stabbing
- Weapon: Knife
- Victim: Shazneen Tasnim Rahman
- Perpetrator: Shahidul Islam
- Accused: 6
- Verdict: Guilty
- Convicted: 1

The Shazneen Tasnim Rahman murder was the rape and murder of Shazneen Tasnim Rahman in Dhaka, Bangladesh which became a "sensational" case.

== History ==
Shazneen Tasnim Rahman was the daughter of Latifur Rahman, the founder and chairman of Transcom Group. Born on June 27, 1982, she was 15 in 1998 and a student of Scholastica in Dhaka.

=== Incident ===
Shazneen Tasnim Rahman was raped and murdered in her home in Gulshan, Dhaka on 23 April 1998. She was stabbed 20 times. Her body was discovered by domestic help Moslem Hawlader. There was a party going on in the house.

=== Trial ===
Her father filed a case on 24 April 1998 in Gulshan Police station. On 4 September 1998, the Criminal Investigation Department filed a case under Women and Children Repression Prevention Act. On 6 December 1998 charges were pressed against six accused. On 13 April 1999, murder and rape charges were framed. On 6 July 1999, Bangladesh High Court Justice Mohammad Abdul Karim and Justice A. B. M. Khairul Haque stayed the murder case in the Additional Metropolitan Sessions Judge's Court as the case was indicted in the Women and Children Repression Prevention Tribunal. The accused appealed the High Court Verdict. On 11 November 1999 a four-member Appellate Division bench made out of Chief Justice Mustafa Kamal, Justices Latifur Rahman, AM Mahmudur Rahman, and Mahmudul Amin Choudhury rejected the appeal of the accused.

The accused are Shahidul Islam, domestic help, contractor Syed Sajjad Mainuddin Hasan, his assistant Badal, and carpenter Shaniram Mandal. Two other accused were maids Estema Khatun Minu and Parvin. On 2 September 2003, the six accused were sentenced to death by Women and Children Repression Prevention Tribunal. On 10 July 2006, Bangladesh High Court upheld the death sentence of the accused but acquitted Shaniram Mandal. On 26 April 2009, Appellate Division accepted the leave-to-appeal prayers of the accused. On 2 August 2016, all the accused except Shahidul Islam were acquitted by the Supreme Court of Bangladesh. Shahidul Islam was hanged at 9:45 pm on 29 November 2017 in Kashimpur High Security Prison in Gazipur.
