= Dismislab =

Bangladeshi fact-checking and digital media research initiative

- ডিসমিসল্যাব
- Formation: December 2022
- Type: Fact-checking organization
- Purpose: Verification of viral claims; research on online misinformation and platform manipulation
- Headquarters: Dhaka, Bangladesh
- Region served: Bangladesh
- Official language: Bengali & English
- Website: https://dismislab.com/

Dismislab (Bengali: ডিসমিসল্যাব) is a Bangladesh-based fact-checking and digital media research initiative that publishes verifications of viral claims and research on online misinformation and platform manipulation. It was established in December 2022 and has been described by third-party outlets as an independent fact-checking initiative.

== Overview ==
Dismislab has been cited in Bangladeshi and international media coverage as a source for debunking viral claims and for publishing research on disinformation trends, including election-related narratives and synthetic or AI-generated political content. It has also been referenced in a report that discusses misinformation trends in Bangladesh more broadly.

== Work ==
=== Elections and political misinformation ===
During Bangladesh election periods, Dismislab has been cited by news outlets for analyses of disinformation narratives and for fact-checks of widely shared claims. BBC News Bangla has referenced Dismislab reporting and commentary in coverage of election-related online misinformation and AI-generated campaign content.

=== Online incitement analysis ===
In February 2026, Prothom Alo (English edition) reported on an analysis by The Daily Star and Dismislab that examined Facebook posts circulating before, during, and after mob attacks on The Daily Star and Prothom Alo, describing a pattern of online incitement and escalation into real-world violence.

== Recognition and impact ==
Dismislab's findings and analyses have been cited by multiple Bangladeshi mainstream news outlets in their reporting on misinformation and digital media trends. In such coverage, the initiative is generally presented as a source of verification or analytical commentary on viral claims and disinformation patterns. References to Dismislab's work often appear in reports addressing politically sensitive topics, including election-related misinformation, coordinated online behavior, and the circulation of synthetic or AI-generated content.

== See also ==
- Rumor Scanner Bangladesh
- Fact-checking
- Misinformation
- Disinformation
