= Rozina Islam =

Bangladeshi journalist

- রোজিনা ইসলাম
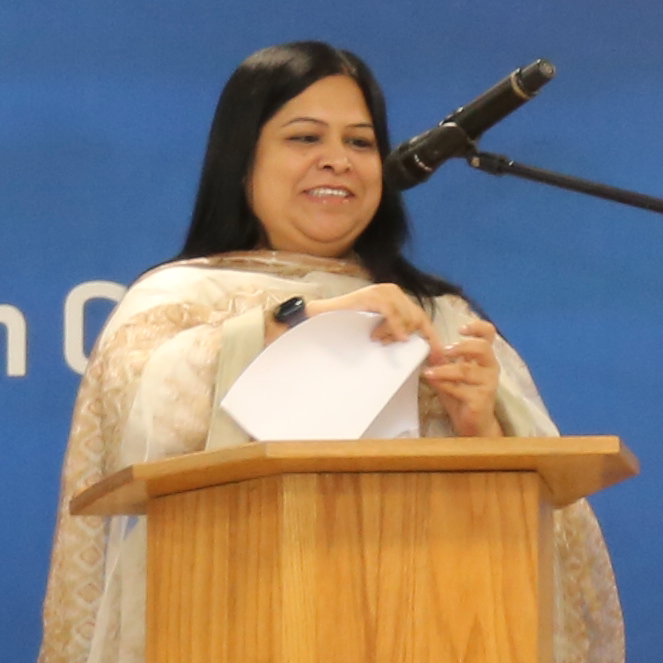
- Islam in 2023
- Born: 17 March 1979 (age 47); Dhaka, Bangladesh
- Education: National University, Bangladesh; Indian Institute of Mass Communication
- Occupation: Investigative journalist
- Years active: 2002–present
- Employer: Prothom Alo
- Spouse: Monirul Islam Mithu
- Children: Alvina Islam
- Awards: UNESCO Award (2011); Canadian Awards for Excellence in Bangladeshi Journalism (2011); Free Press Award in the Most Resilient Journalist category (2021); Anti-Corruption Champions Award from the United States Department of State (2022)
- Website: rozinaislambd.com

Rozina Islam (born 17 March 1979) is a Bangladeshi investigative journalist. She is a special correspondent of Prothom Alo. She is known for her investigative reporting on corruption, public administration, health, governance, crime and women's issues. Her reporting has received national and international recognition. She has received several national and international awards for her investigative journalism. These include UNESCO Award (2011), Canadian Awards for Excellence in Bangladeshi Journalism (2011), DRU–Grameenphone Sagor-Runi Memorial Award for Investigative Journalism (2014), Transparency International Bangladesh Investigative Journalism Award (2015), Free Press Award in Most Resilient Journalist category (2021) and Anti-Corruption Champions Award from United States Department of State (2022).

== Early life and education ==
Islam was born on 17 March 1979 in Dhaka. She completed a master's degree in Social Welfare from National University of Bangladesh. She also received professional training in journalism, including a Diploma in Development Journalism from Indian Institute of Mass Communication (IIMC) and a Diploma in Journalism from Press Institute of Bangladesh (PIB). She attended several international journalism training programmes, including International Visitor Leadership Program (IVLP) of United States and training at Poynter Institute.

== Career ==
She began her journalism career in 2002 as a reporter for The Daily Sangbad. In 2010, she joined Prothom Alo as a special correspondent. Throughout her career, she has reported on health, corruption, crime, government affairs, politics, energy, education, environment, women's rights and Bangladesh Liberation War. She is particularly known for investigative reports that exposed corruption in the public sector, especially in the health sector. Her work has contributed to public discussions on accountability and transparency in Bangladesh.

=== Arrest in 2021 ===
On 17 May 2021, Rozina Islam was detained inside the Bangladesh Secretariat while reporting on Ministry of Health and Family Welfare. She was later arrested under Official Secrets Act and Penal Code on allegations of removing confidential government documents. The arrest attracted widespread criticism from journalist organizations, human rights groups and international media freedom organizations, which called for her release and expressed concern over press freedom in Bangladesh. She was later released on bail.

== Awards and honours ==
- UNESCO Award (2011)
- Canadian Awards for Excellence in Bangladeshi Journalism (2011)
- DRU–Grameenphone Sagor-Runi Memorial Award for Investigative Journalism (2014)
- Transparency International Bangladesh Investigative Journalism Award (2015)
- Free Press Award in Most Resilient Journalist category (2021)
- Anti-Corruption Champions Award from United States Department of State (2022)

== Professional memberships ==
- National Press Club, Bangladesh
- Dhaka Reporters Unity
- Bangladesh Secretariat Reporters Forum
- Bangladesh Women Journalist Forum
- Economic Reporters Forum
- South Asian Women in Media (SWAM)

== See also ==
- Investigative journalism
- Prothom Alo
- Press freedom in Bangladesh
- Arrest of Rozina Islam
