= Latifur Rahman =

Bangladeshi jurist (1936–2017)

- লতিফুর রহমান

Chief Adviser of Bangladesh
- In office 15 July 2001 – 10 October 2001
- President: Shahabuddin Ahmed
- Preceded by: Sheikh Hasina (as Prime Minister)
- Succeeded by: Khaleda Zia (as Prime Minister)

Chief Justice of Bangladesh
- In office 1 January 2000 – 28 February 2001
- Appointed by: Shahabuddin Ahmed
- President: Shahabuddin Ahmed
- Prime Minister: Sheikh Hasina
- Preceded by: Mustafa Kamal
- Succeeded by: Mahmudul Amin Choudhury

Personal details
- Born: 1 March 1936 Jessore, Bengal, British Raj
- Died: 6 June 2017 (aged 81) Dhaka, Bangladesh
- Children: 3
- Education: University of Dhaka (LLB)

Latifur Rahman (1 March 1936 – 6 June 2017) was a Bangladeshi jurist who served as Chief Justice of Bangladesh from 2000 to 2001 and as Chief Adviser of Bangladesh in 2001. His judicial career started in 1981, and lasted until 2001.

== Early life and education ==
Latifur Rahman was born in Jessore, British Raj, on 1 March 1936, to Khan Bahadur Lutfur Rahman. Rahman's maternal uncle, Nurul Huda, was a High Court judge. He graduated from the University of Dhaka with a degree in English literature in 1956, and later with a Bachelor of Laws degree.

== Career ==
Rahman taught at Government Shaheed Suhrawardy College before becoming a lawyer. He apprenticed under M. H. Khandaker, the 1st Attorney General of Bangladesh. Rahman became a member of the Dhaka High Court in 1960. He became a high court judge in 1981, and an appellate division judge on 15 January 1990. From 1 January 2000 to 28 February 2001, Rahman served as Chief Justice of Bangladesh.

Rahman was appointed Chief Adviser of Bangladesh for a caretaker government as he was the most recent chief justice. The caretaker government was led by Rahman from 15 July to 10 October 2001. His government oversaw the 2001 election. Khaleda Zia succeeded Rahman's caretaker government.

== Personal life ==
Rahman was married and was the father of three children. Rahman suffered a stroke on 23 May 2017, and died at Samorita Hospital in Dhaka, Bangladesh, on 6 June. The Appellate Division, Supreme Court of Bangladesh suspended its proceedings in honour of Rahman.

== Publication ==
- "Tattabadhayak Sarkarer Dinguli O Amar Katha (The Days of the Caretaker Government and My Account)" (2014)

== Works cited ==
=== News ===
- "Former chief adviser Justice Latifur Rahman dies at 81". Bdnews24.com. 6 June 2017. Archived from the original on 5 July 2025.
- "Justice Latifur passes away". The Daily Star. 7 June 2017. Archived from the original on 5 July 2025.

Legal offices
Preceded by Mustafa Kamal	Chief Justice of Bangladesh; 2000–2001	Succeeded by Mahmudul Amin Choudhury
Political offices
Preceded by Sheikh Hasina	Prime Minister of Bangladesh; Acting; 2001	Succeeded by Khaleda Zia
Preceded by Abdus Samad Azad	Minister of Foreign Affairs; 2001	Succeeded by Badruddoza Chowdhury
