= Abul Mansur Ahmad =

Bangladeshi journalist and politician (1898–1979)

- আবুল মনসুর আহমদ
- Born: Ahmad Ali Farazi; 3 September 1898; Mymensingh, Bengal Presidency, British Raj
- Died: 18 March 1979 (aged 80); Dhaka, Bangladesh
- Education: Dhaka College; Ripon College (BL)
- Occupations: Litterateur; politician; journalist
- Spouse: Akikunnesa (m. 1926)
- Children: 5, including: Mahbub Anam; Mahfuz Anam
- Relatives: Tahmima Anam (granddaughter)
- Awards: Bangla Academy Literary Award; Independence Day Award

Abul Mansur Ahmad (Bengali: আবুল মনসুর আহমদ, pronounced [ˈabul ˈmɔnsuɾ ˈaɦmɔd]; born Ahmad Ali Farazi, 3 September 1898 – 18 March 1979) was a Bangladeshi politician, lawyer, journalist, and writer.

Ahmad began as an Indian National Congress worker in Bengal. He participated in the Khilafat Movement in his early youth. A strong advocate of peasant rights, disappointed by the Congress's negligence to Muslim peasants, like many other Muslim Congress workers of Bengal, he left the Congress and founded the Praja Samity (later the Krishak-Praja Samity), a peasant welfare organisation and its political arm the Krishak Praja Party (KPP). He became a major organiser of the KPP in the greater Mymensingh district region. As the KPP president A K Fazlul Huq took office as the first prime minister of Bengal, after the 1937 provincial elections, Ahmad became one of his closest confidantes. Disheartened by KPP's failure in the government, he inclined towards the thriving Muslim League and the Pakistan Movement in the early 1940s. He realised that Pakistan is inevitable and urged the KPP workers to join the Muslim League, fearing a feudal elite and clergy domination in its leadership.

Ahmad was dismayed by the Muslim League government in East Pakistan. He joined the Awami Muslim League (later the Awami League), a dissident offshoot of the Muslim League. He proposed the Jukta Front coalition for the 1954 provincial elections and also authored its 21-points election manifesto. The Jukta Front won a landslide victory in the election and he was elected to the legislative assembly. He was a major critic of the Pakistan Constitution assembly debate in 1956. He served as the Minister of Commerce and Industry in the Suhrawardy cabinet of the central Government of Pakistan, also occasionally serving as the acting prime minister.

Ahmad was an author of stories, novels, and political satires. He also wrote extensively on politics, culture, and history. He argued that despite sharing the same Bengali language, Muslims of Bengal, primarily in East Bengal (often referred by him as 'Muslim Bengal'), had developed and cultivated a distinct Perso-Arabic-influenced Bengali Muslim culture in parallel to the Hindu culture cultivated by the Hindus of Bengal. In his writings, he used the East Bengal dialect of Bengali and the Perso-Arabic words used by the Muslims of Bengal, for which he suffered discrimination on occasions. He saw Pakistan as an opportunity for flourishing East Bengal's culture. As a member of the East Pakistan Renaissance Society, he provided a vision for East Bengal's literary ideal.

As a journalist and politician, Ahmad observed and was involved in many crucial political events of Bengal and India at large. At different stages of his career, he was a confidante to many leading political figures of Bengal, including A K Fazlul Huq, Subhas Chandra Bose, and Huseyn Shaheed Suhrawardy. He was an important intermediary in many political arbitrations. His magnum opus Amar Dekha Rajneetir Panchash Bachhar (Fifty Years of Politics As I Saw It) (1969) is a first-hand chronicle and a critique of the politics of Bengal spanning his career.

He was awarded the Bangla Academy Literary Award in 1960 and the Independence Day Award in 1979 by the Government of Bangladesh.

== Early life and education ==
Ahmad was born Ahmad Ali Farazi on 3 September 1898, at Dhanikhola, a village in the Mymensingh district of Bengal Province in British India (now in Bangladesh), to Abdur Rahim Farazi and Mir Jahan Begum. Before Ahmad's birth, Mymensingh used to be an important centre of the Tariqah-i-Muhammadiya, an early nineteenth-century anti-British movement led by Sayyid Ahmad Shahid and Shah Ismail Dehlvi. Both the paternal and maternal sides of his family had strong Ahl-i Hadith connections and were among the earliest four families in the region to subscribe to the cause, thus earning the title Farazi. (Note: Not to be confused with the participants of the Faraizi Movement in Bengal, led by Haji Shariatullah, as Ahmad warned in his autobiography.) Frequented by the local Wahhabi leaders, his paternal home served as the preaching centre of Wahhabism in that area. His paternal grandfather's brother Ashek Ullah was among the few who volunteered from Bengal to fight against the Sikhs, led by Barelvi, in the North-West Frontier Province (now the Khyber Pakhtunkhwa province in Pakistan)—also said to have taken part in the infamous Battle of Balakot.

Ahmad developed resentment against the landowners (zamindars) early in his childhood. In Bengal zamindars were predominantly Hindu at that time. He regarded the treatment of Muslim peasants not only by the zamindars but the Hindu community in general as discriminatory.

After his early schooling at nearby schools, in 1913 Ahmad moved to the Mymensingh town (also called Nasirabad), his district headquarter, for further studies. There he entered the Mrityunjay School, from where he matriculated in 1917, securing first division and a scholarship, and moved to Dhaka, the principal town in East Bengal, for further studies. He entered Jagannath College and found residence at a house in old Dhaka in an arrangement called jaigir. Inspired by the professor of Logic, Umesh Chandra Bhattacharya, he began studying philosophical texts of John Stuart Mill, Ramendra Sundar Tribedi, Hiren Dutta, Brajen Seal, Annie Besant, etc. He took the Intermediate exam from there in 1919. Then he completed Bachelor of Arts in philosophy from Dhaka College in 1921. After a pause in studies, due to his political activism, he entered Ripon College (later renamed to Surendranath College) in Kolkata, capital of the Bengal province, in 1926 to study Law and passed the BL examination in 1929.

== British India ==
While a student at Dhaka College, in 1920 Ahmad attended the Khilafat Conference, attended by the all-India Khilafat leaders, held in Dhaka, as a volunteer. As the Khilafat Movement and the Non-cooperation Movement joined forces later that year, Ahmad got involved in it. Inspired by the 'back to village' policy of the movement, he and a few of his friends left Dhaka and returned to his village in Mymensingh. They established a village co-operative, a free 'national' high school and a weaving school. He served as the headmaster of the high school and his friend Abul Kalam Shamsuddin, who joined him from Kolkata, became its assistant headmaster. However, within a year the movement lost momentum as the leader of the movement, Mohandas Gandhi, terminated Non-cooperation after the Chauri Chaura incident. Ahmad left his village and returned to Mymensingh town and took job at a national high school.

Ahmad visited Kolkata in mid-1922 to attend a provincial Khilafat Committee conference and also to find a job in a newspaper. Advised by his friend Shamsuddin, who had returned to Kolkata and was editing the Moslem Jagat, he started publishing articles in the 'Muslim newspapers', mainly in the Sultan and the Mohammadi, and frequenting their offices. Shamsuddin's Moslem Jagat published his long serial treatise Diarchy in Civilisation, criticising the Government of India Act 1919. He caught the attention of Maniruzzaman Islamabadi, owner of the Sultan. Islamabadi offered him a job as assistant editor in his newspaper. Ahmad left Mymensingh and settled in Kolkata to work for the Sultan.

As Ahmad joined Sultan, Chittaranjan Das brought about the Bengal Pact, a scheme for increasing Muslim representation in the public employments by reserving quotas for them. As a result, communal Hindu political and intellectual leaders lampooned Das in speeches and newspaper articles. Ahmad wrote articles in Sultan in defence of the pact. As Islamabadi, a strong supporter of Das and his Swaraj Party, feared that opponents of the pact may oppose it in the 1924 Congress provincial conference in Sirajganj, he sent Ahmad to Sirajganj prior to the conference charged with building support for the pact.

Ahmad joined Maulana Akram Khan's Mohammadi in 1924. In 1926 he was sacked from the Mohammadi. He began editing a new weekly called Khadem.

=== The Krishak-Praja Party ===
Ahmad joined the Congress movement under Subhas Chandra Bose. However, frustrated with the Congress's negligence to the peasant cause, particularly after Chittaranjan Das's death in 1925, he left the Congress and joined the Praja Samity, founded in 1929 by Maulana Akram Khan and others. He returned to Mymensingh in 1929 to organise the Praja Samity and practice law there until 1938. The Praja Samity eventually became a major political force in Mymensingh, with Ahmad as a leading organiser. It secured 64 out of the 72 seats in the district's Local Board elections. As contention arose among the senior and youth leadership about choosing the succeeding president, Ahmad sided with the youth faction, supporting A K Fazlul Huq. In 1936 A K Fazlul Huq was elected president of Praja Samity and the organisation was renamed to Krishak-Praja Samity.

The Krishak-Praja Samity's political wing the Krishak-Praja Party (KPP) set out to participate in the 1937 Bengal Legislative Assembly elections. Ahmad drafted the party's 14-point election manifesto. The two other major competitors in the election, the Congress and the Muslim League had organisation all over India, while the KPP was a provincial party. A delegation, with Ahmad as a member, was charged with forging an electoral alliance between the KPP and the Muslim League prior to the election. The delegation met with Muhammad Ali Jinnah, the president of the All-India Muslim League, several times in Kolkata. However, the alliance was unsuccessful as Jinnah refused to accept KPP's demand for abolishing landownership without compensation. He viewed that peasants will benefit only through a strong Muslim unity and personally advised Ahmad: 'take it from me without Muslim solidarity you will never be able to do any good to them (peasants)'.

None of the major parties, the Muslim League, the Congress, and the KPP, won a majority in the election. The KPP sought a coalition with the Congress; the Congress also initially agreed. The Congress election manifesto promised to release the political prisoners. As the governor of the province, appointed by the British government, held right to veto cabinet decisions, the Congress was resolved to resign from the cabinet had he vetoed on this issue. During the negotiations, Ahmad insisted that the cabinet mustn't resign on that occasion as he feared in that case the cabinet would be resigning without fulfilling any KPP commitments to the interest of peasants. Congress refused to compromise on this and the coalition couldn't happen. As a result, the KPP took office in coalition with the Muslim League, dominated by feudal elites and rich merchants. Though the KPP leader Huq became the prime minister, in the face of Muslim League intrigues, KPP became a minority in the cabinet. With the KPP minister Syed Nausher Ali's resignation within a few months of taking office, the cabinet became bereft of KPP ministers except prime minister Huq.

Ahmad returned to Kolkata in 1938 as the editor of the Krishak, KPP's mouthpiece newspaper. In the cabinet, prime minister Huq was cornered by the Muslim League ministers and the governor. Though his cabinet took many popular measures, like the Bengal Tenancy (Amendment) Act (1938), Money Lenders' Act (1938), reformation of the education system, etc., it couldn't benefit the peasants as expected. Relationship between Huq and the KPP became strained and the party became divided. Huq was also not in good terms with the central Muslim League leadership, including with Jinnah. Ahmad left the Krishak in July 1941 over a discontent with one of its directors and joined the Navayug, patronised by Huq. Huq, who had realised that Bengal's interest was being harmed by the central Muslim League leadership and was seeking a way out of it, gave Ahmad the express mission to support him in the process through Navayug. Huq instituted a new cabinet called the Progressive Coalition on 10 December 1941. Huq eventually resigned from the Muslim League.

=== The Muslim League and the Pakistan Movement ===
Disheartened by the Huq cabinet's weakness and KPP infighting, Ahmad's political views became perplexed and he briefly endeavoured alternative political ideologies. At that time Subhas Bose, former president of the Congress, was seeking alliance between the Bengal provincial Muslim League and his newly founded Forward Bloc. He persuaded Bose to meet the central Muslim League president Jinnah, instead of the provincial Muslim League leaders. Bose hesitated, citing the Lahore Resolution as the impediment. Ahmad cleared Bose's mind about the Lahore Resolution, explaining its true essence. Bose met Jinnah accordingly. However, Bose escaped house arrest and left India in 1941 in a bid to organise an armed resistance against the British rule with foreign help.

With Bose's escape, whom Ahmad regarded as the last hope for Hindu-Muslim unity in Bengal, Ahmad was drawn even more towards the Muslim League and the Pakistan movement. He was deeply influenced by B R Ambedkar's and Mujibur Rahman's treatises on Pakistan. He also regarded the Muslim League president Jinnah as a rational and secular leader. He concluded that Pakistan could be an option for the Muslims of Bengal. However, he feared that peasant and worker class interests might be suppressed in it unless the leadership is captured early by the class. He urged the Krishak-Praja Party workers to join the Pakistan movement and seize its leadership. Bengal Muslim League leader Huseyn Shaheed Suhrawardy mediated in an initiative for a KPP-Muslim League front. Though some KPP members, including the Krishak-Praja Samity president Abdullahil Baki, agreed but the KPP legislators refused to accept the Muslim League terms. Ahmad became an active member of the Muslim League in around 1944. Later the KPP leaders joined the Muslim League and the Congress sporadically, effectively disintegrating the KPP.

Ahmad joined the Renaissance Society, founded by Abul Kalam Shamsuddin, editor of the Azad newspaper, and others, devoted to popularise the Pakistan movement.

== Pakistan ==
In August 1946 a great communal riot took place in Kolkata, killing many people. Ahmad observed the horrors of the riot first hand. The riot spurred the partition of India. In August 1947 India was partitioned and Pakistan was born. East Bengal joined Pakistan. Leaders like Suhrawardy and Huq were sidelined. In East Pakistan, a government led by the sycophantic Muslim League leaders came into power. Ahmad remained in Kolkata, largely inactive in politics, mainly busy editing the Ittehad, owned by Suhrawardy, starting from January 1947 and practicing law.

The Muslim League government of East Pakistan lost popularity fast, owing to many of its unpopular moves. It sided with Jinnah on the state language question in 1948. A dissident group of the Muslim League, mainly followers of Suhrawardy and Abul Hashim, formed the Awami Muslim League (literally People's Muslim League) in 1949 in Dhaka. In 1950 Ahmad moved to his home in Mymensingh in East Pakistan and joined the Awami League.

Anti-Muslim League sentiment was rife in East Pakistan. In 1952 several protesters demanding Bangla as a state language of Pakistan died as policed fired in protest. That further alienated the government. Ahmad was the proponent of the Jukta Front coalition between the Awami Muslim League and the Krisak-Sramik Party (KSP), founded by A K Fazlul Huq, in the 1954 provincial assembly election of Pakistan. He also authored the 21-point program, the election manifesto of the Jukta Front. He contested in the election and was elected member of parliament from the Trishal constituency of the Mymensingh district. He took office as a minister in the extended Jukta Front cabinet on 15 May 1954. However, the cabinet was dismissed within a few months by the central government and governor's rule was imposed.

Suhrawardy became a minister in Chaudhry Mohammad Ali cabinet. The Jukta Front coalition was disintegrating due to infighting. On several occasions, Ahmad himself took part in arbitrations to salvage the situation.

Ahmad represented the opposition in the Constitution drafting assembly session in 1956, addressing for seven hours in two days.

He was the provincial education minister in the Awami League coalition cabinet, formed on 6 September 1956, led by Ataur Rahman Khan. Only six days later, he took office of the commerce and industries ministry in the central government, led by Prime Minister Suhrawardy, and relocated in Karachi, the then capital of Pakistan. During prime minister Suhrawardy's foreign tours, he served as the acting prime minister too.

As the commerce and industry minister, Ahmad pledged to increase participation of East Pakistan in trade and commerce. He also took a number of steps against corruption in business thus antagonizing a group of influential merchants. During one of his acting prime ministership stints, he recognised the Engineers Institution of Dhaka. The president Iskander Mirza often got angry with his acts. The Suhrawardy cabinet resigned on 18 October 1957.

As general Ayub Khan seized power in a coup d'état and declared Martial Law in October 1958, Ahmad was imprisoned with many other Awami League leaders and was released in June 1959. He was arrested again in 1962, the year Ayub Khan imposed a new constitution. The same year he suffered from pleural effusion and remained in coma for eighteen days. After that he gradually retired from politics.

Ahmad continued publishing political commentaries in newspapers. He ghost wrote the booklet titled Our Right to Live elaborating the six-points in 1966 for Sheikh Mujibur Rahman. He also urged the democratic party leaders to take part in the 1970 general election under General Yahya Khan's Legal Framework Order (LFO).

== Family ==
Ahmad married Akikunnesa on 26 February 1926. Akikunnesa was an author herself. Together they had four sons: Mahbub Anam (d. 9 July 2001), Matlub Anam (d. 7 July 2010), Manzur Anam (d. 16 April 2014), and Mahfuz Anam.

== Death ==
Ahmad died on 18 March 1979 in Dhaka.

== Views and opinions ==
=== Politics of Bengal ===
Ahmad despised the landlord system (zamindari) and was vocal for the rights of the Muslim peasants of Bengal. That was his inspiration into politics. He believed that the peasant movement was predominantly a 'Muslim organisation' devoted to ensuring social dignity of the Muslims of East Bengal. Though he joined the Krishak-Praja Samity for the welfare of the landless poor peasants (bargadars), he admitted that it was not a peasant organisation in true sense; rather it represented the relatively wealthier peasants (jotedars).

Ahmad criticised the 'fusionist' Hindu-Muslim unity approach, which, according to him, sought to fuse both communities into one, taken by the Hindu political and intellectual leadership. He identified Chittaranjan Das and Sarat Chandra Bose as the notable exceptions who took the right approach to the problem and as a result made enemy with the central Congress leadership. Ahmad also believed that Bengal's shift from Bengali Nationalism to Indian Nationalism was prompted by a fear of Muslim majority rule under democratic elections.

Ahmad viewed Bengal's politics as distinct from that of India and admired its exponents, such as Chittarajnan Das, Subhas Bose, and Fazlul Huq. He believed that the Congress's refusal to form the coalition cabinet with KPP after the 1937 elections precipitated western dependence in the politics of Bengal. As the Hindu leadership became dependent on the central Congress, Muslims also, by necessity, became dependent on the central Muslim League. Ahmad also believed that despite being a Muslim organisation, with Bengal Congress's support, KPP would probably become a real peasant organisation, which would benefit both Hindu and Muslim landless poor peasants.

== Literary works ==
=== Novels ===
- Satya Mithya (1953)
- Jiban Kshudha (1955)
- Ab-e-Hayat (1968)

=== Satires ===
- Aina (1936–1937)
- Food Conference (1944)
- Gulliverer Safar Nama
- Asmani Purdah

Eassy Book

- Pak-Bengali Culture (1966)
- Our Freedom

=== Reminiscence ===
- Bangladesher Culture
- Amar Dekha Rajnitir Panchash Bachhar (1969)
- Sher-e-Bangla Hoite Bangabandhu (1972)
- End of a Betrayal Restoration of Lahore Resolution (1975)
- Atmakatha (1978, autobiography)

== Awards ==
- Bangla Academy Literary Award (1960)
- Independence Day Award (1979)
- Nasiruddin Gold Medal

== Sources ==
- Ahmad, Abul Mansur (2013) [First published 1969]. আমার দেখা রাজনীতির পঞ্চাশ বছর [Fifty Years of Politics As I Saw It] (in Bengali) (5th ed.). Dhaka: Khoshroj Kitab Mahal. ISBN 978-9844380004.
- Ahmad, Abul Mansur (2018) [First published November 1978]. আত্মকথা [Autobiography] (in Bengali). Dhaka: Prothoma Prokashan. ISBN 978-9849350194.
