= Shaheen Anam =

Bangladeshi activist

Shaheen Anam, MBE, is a Bangladeshi human rights activist and the Executive Director of Manusher Jonno Foundation.

== Early life ==
Anam was 19 at the start of the Bangladesh Liberation War, her mother feed Mukti Bahini personnel at their home. Her brother was a member of the Mukti Bahini. Anam completed her master's in psychology at the University of Dhaka. She has a master's in social work from Hunter College, City University of New York.

== Career ==
From 1999 to 2002, Anam worked at CARE Bangladesh as the Coordinator for a flood assistance project funded by the United States Agency for International Development. She signed a letter with other women researchers protesting the removal of Muhammad Yunus from Grameen Bank.

Anam has worked for the United Nations High Commissioner for Refugees and the United Nations Development Programme in Bangladesh. She is associated with the BRAC Institute of Governance and Development. She is a coordinator of the South Asian Women’s Network on Skills, Livelihood and Entrepreneurship Development.

In 2021, a case was filed against Anam and Angela Gomes, Executive Director of Banchte Shekha, in the Brahmanbaria Senior Judicial Magistrate Court, alleging that they attempted to amend Hindu law against the interest of the Hindu community. This was preceded by a similar case at the Narayanganj Chief Judicial Magistrate Court, where the Police Bureau of Investigation was instructed to investigate and submit a report.

Anam received an Honorary Member of the Most Excellent Order of the British Empire from the government of the United Kingdom in February 2025. She was critical of Dhaka Metropolitan Police Commissioner Sheikh Md Sazzat Ali for asking the media not to use the term Rape. She had also asked the government of Bangladesh to take action against increasing incidents of rape.

== Bibliography ==
- NGOs in the City

== Personal life ==
Anam is married to Mahfuz Anam, editor of The Daily Star. Their daughter, Tahmima Anam, is a novelist.
