= Mahmudul Amin Choudhury =

Bangladeshi judge (1937–2019)

- মাহমুদুল আমিন চৌধুরী

11th Chief Justice of Bangladesh
- In office 1 March 2001 – 17 June 2002
- Appointed by: Shahabuddin Ahmed
- President: Shahabuddin Ahmed; Badruddoza Chowdhury; Jamiruddin Sircar
- Prime Minister: Sheikh Hasina; Latifur Rahman (acting); Khaleda Zia
- Preceded by: Latifur Rahman
- Succeeded by: Mainur Reza Chowdhury

Personal details
- Born: 18 June 1937 Sylhet, Sylhet District, Sylhet Division, Bangladesh
- Died: 22 December 2019 (aged 82) Dhaka, Bangladesh
- Resting place: Shah Jalal Dargah Cemetery, Sylhet, Bangladesh

Mahmudul Amin Choudhury (18 June 1937 – 22 December 2019) was a Bangladeshi jurist who served as the 11th Chief Justice of Bangladesh. He was the judge on the Shazneen Tasnim Rahman murder trial. He died on 22 December 2019 at the age of 82.
