= Bangladesh Sangbadpatra Parishad =

National trade body of newspapers

- Abbreviation: BSP
- Headquarters: Dhaka, Bangladesh
- Region served: Bangladesh
- Official language: Bengali

Bangladesh Sangbadpatra Parishad (Bengali: বাংলাদেশ সংবাদপত্র পরিষদ) (Bangladesh Newspaper Association) is a national trade body of newspapers in Bangladesh. Mohammad Noor Ali, owner of Amader Shomoy and Chairman of Unique group is the President of the association. Mohammad Nizam Uddin Jitu, of the Daily Janakantha, is the General Secretary.

== History ==
In 2006, Bangladesh Sangbadpatra Parishad had called for a reduction in duty on newsprint import to reduce the price of newsprint in the local market, which was higher than the international market. According to Bangladesh law newsprint imported for newspaper has a 25 percent import tax; this is reduced if the newspaper sources 50 percent of its newsprint from local producers. The association criticised the proposed Digital Security Act as being detrimental to Freedom of the Press in Bangladesh in January 2018.

On 6 January 2020, Bangladesh Police arrested MG Kibria Chowdhury, convener of Bangladesh Sangbadpatra Parishad and editor of Dainik Jatio Arthonitee, from the Dhaka headquarters of his newspaper. He was arrested following a case filled against him by Md Ataur Rahman Bhuiyan Manik, vice-president of the Noakhali District unit of Bangladesh Awami League and chairman of Toma Group, under the Digital Security Act with Sonaimuri police station.

Bangladesh Sangbadpatra Parishad requested a 10 thousand core taka stimulus package or grant from the government of Bangladesh in 2020 for the newspaper industry following the COVID-19 pandemic in Bangladesh.

Bangladesh Sangbadpatra Parishad fought a landmark public interest litigation against the government of Bangladesh. The litigation was filed by the association over the government fixing the minimum wage of newspaper employees in 1991. The judge rejected their case as public interest litigation which harmed the development of public interest litigation in Bangladesh. The first accepted public interest litigation case took place in 1996. Bangladesh High Court had ruled that the association had not locus standi.

== See also ==
- Newspaper Owners' Association of Bangladesh
