= The Bangladesh Times =

Bangladeshi daily newspaper

- Type: Daily newspaper
- Founder: Sheikh Fazlul Haque Mani
- Founded: 1974
- Language: English
- Country: Bangladesh
- Website: www.bangladeshtimes.com

The Bangladesh Times was an English-language daily newspaper of Bangladesh. It was published by the Bangladesh Times Trustee Board which was chaired by Obaidul Haque. Mahbub Anam served as Editor of the Magazine.

== History ==
The Bangladesh Times was founded in 1974 by Sheikh Fazlul Haque Mani. In 1975, The Bangladesh Times along with Ittefaq, Dainik Bangla, and Bangladesh Observer were nationalized by the Government of Bangladesh. The government banned all newspapers except the four nationalized ones. Following the assassination of Sheikh Mujibur Rahman in the 15 August 1975 Bangladesh coup d'état the newspaper welcomed the government of Khandaker Moshtaque Ahmed. Enayetullah Khan, the editor of the Holiday, became editor of the newspaper in 1975. Khan would write against Sheikh Mujibur Rahman in the newspaper and would go on to serve as a Minister in the Ziaur Rahman administration. In May 1976, The Bangladesh Times provided the biggest media coverage in Bangladesh to the Farakka Long March. Khan served as the editor of the newspaper till 1977. The Bangladesh Times were closed in 1997 along with Danik Bangla and other state owned newspapers. In March 2004, Information Minister Tariqul Islam said the government is considering reopening the newspaper along with Dainik Bangla under private management.
