= Arrest of Rozina Islam =

2021 arrest of a Bangladeshi journalist

Rozina Islam
- রোজিনা ইসলাম
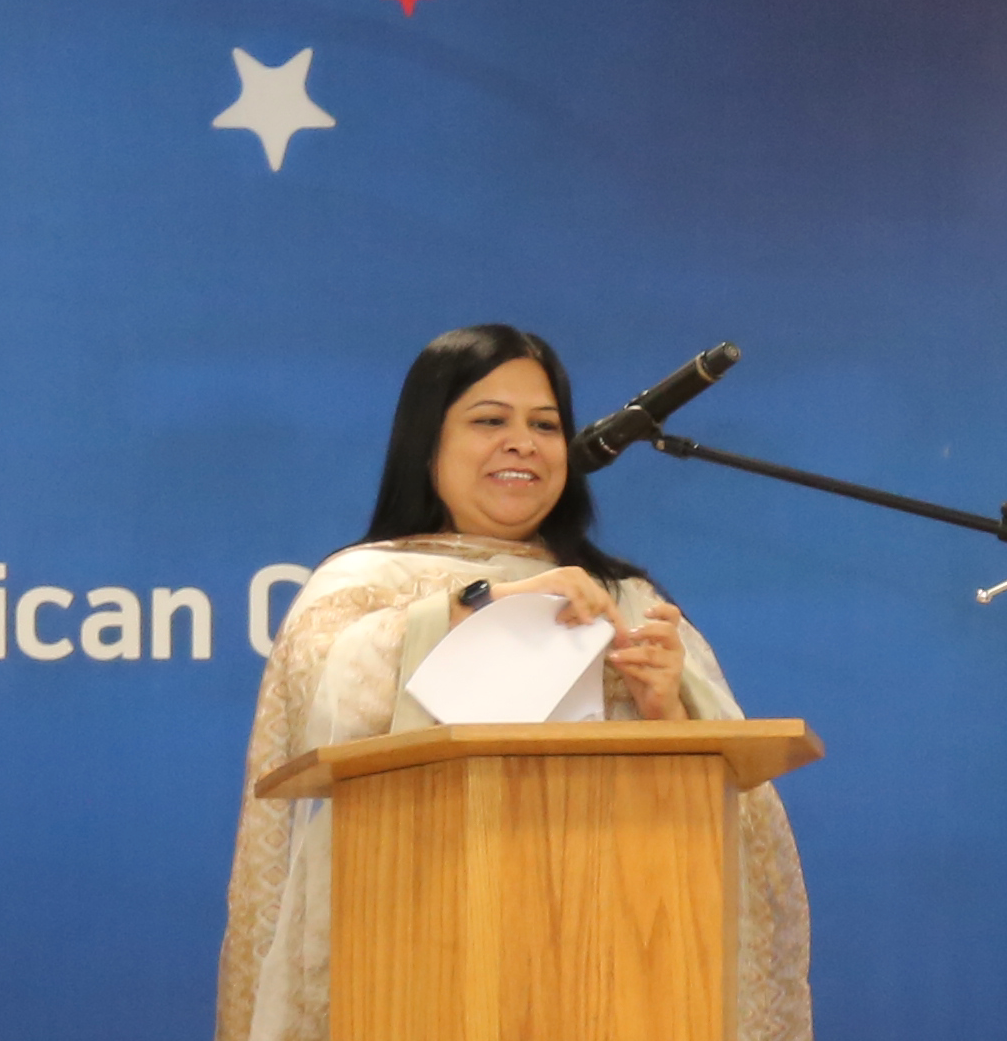
- Occupation: Journalist
- Organization: Daily Prothom Alo
- Spouse: Monirul Islam Mithu

On April 17, 2021, Rozina Islam, a senior female reporter of the Bangladeshi daily Prothom Alo, went to the Health Ministry office in the Bangladesh Secretariat for COVID-19 related reporting. She was confined in the ministry for five hours and her cell phones were seized. She was allegedly harassed and assaulted during her detention at the secretariat. She was then arrested from the Ministry for alleged theft and taking photographs of sensitive state documents. Sibbir Ahmed Osmani, Deputy Secretary of the Health Services Division, filed a case against her around midnight of April 17, 2021 with Shahbagh police station under the Official Secrets Act. She was jailed in Dhaka Kashimpur Women's Central Jail amid widespread protests. A virtual hearing for her bail was held on May 20, 2021, later the court announced the decision would be delayed to May 23, 2021, and on that day she was granted a conditional bail after being imprisoned for 7 days.

== Background ==
Rozina Islam is known for her investigative news reporting on official corruption and misconduct. Several news stories published by her previously have a claim to have exposed the alleged corruption of the Ministry of Health and others and have drawn attention to the alleged graft of millions of dollars that were spent on health equipment to fight the COVID-19 pandemic.

=== Honors and awards ===
Islam received several national and international awards for her investigative journalism. In 2021 Amsterdam based Free Press Unlimited awarded her the Free Press Award 2021 in the Most Resilient Journalist category. Her other notable awards are:

- UNESCO Prize (2011)
- Canadian awards for excellence in Bangladeshi Journalism (2011)
- Mass Media Award Bangladesh to Prevent Corruption (2014)
- Deutsche Welle International Prize for Corruption (2015)
- TIB Investigative Journalism Award (2015)

=== Lawsuit and arrest ===
Rozina Islam was arrested on 16 May 2021 on charges of stealing information, removing the state secret documents under the Penal Code of 180, and the Official Secrets Act of 1923, and taking pictures of them without permission. Human rights groups have claimed that she was tortured for publishing news of corruption, and it has been widely reported in the media.

== Aftermath ==
Nationwide protests broke out after the arrest of Rozina Islam, demanding the immediate release of her. A subsequent press conference by the Ministry of Health in the Bangladesh Secretariat was boycotted by journalists following a decision of the Bangladesh Secretariat Reporters' Forum. The Bangladesh government has faced severe backlash both nationally and internationally for the incident. The UN has condemned and expressed concern over the arrest of Rozina Islam. In response to the detention of Rozina Islam on allegations of stealing confidential official documents and espionage, a spokesman for Amnesty International said, "Rozina Islam must not be punished for her journalistic work." RSF, an international non-profit and non-governmental organization with the stated aim of safeguarding the right to freedom of information, called for the immediate release of Rozina Islam. Human Rights Watch, an international non-governmental organization, headquartered in New York City, that conducts research and advocacy on human rights, urged the released of Islam. National Press Club in Washington DC and the National Press Club Journalism Institute (U.S.) has urged the release of Islam.

Dhaka Union of Journalists (DUJ), and Diplomatic Correspondents Association, Bangladesh (DCAB), has condemned the arrest of Islam and urged for her release. Newspaper Owners' Association of Bangladesh (NOAB), demanded unconditional release of Islam. Transparency International Bangladesh, the Bangladeshi branch of the Berlin-based Transparency International, has condemned the detention of Islam, also demanded her immediate release. The South Asians for Human Rights (SAHR), a regional network of human rights defenders, has expressed its concern over the detention of Islam.

== Bangladesh government's response ==
Bangladesh's health minister, Zahid Maleque, has denied all the allegations of torturing and 5-hour confinement of Islam. In a press briefing, he said,

This is unfortunate. These documents were related to vaccines -- the Russian and Chinese vaccines. These are non-disclosure documents. If they are leaked, it will violate state commitments. We might not get the vaccines. It could cause great harm to this country and its people. These are secret documents and they should not have been taken away. We didn't confine Rozina for nine or five hours. She was handed over to the police after a confinement for half-an-hour. The Home Minister himself also knows about the matter. I don't have any idea whether she was tortured after being confined at the Health Ministry.

Information and Broadcasting Minister Hasan Mahmud said,

[We should] judge the incident based on the truth, rather than [being] emotional. Anyone can make a mistake at any time. To err is human. Rozina may have made a mistake too. I am a minister appointed by you all. Hence, I am sympathetic towards your claims and will do my best to do what is possible.

=== Prison release ===
On May 23, 2021, Rozina Islam was released from prison after 7 days of imprisonment. A Dhaka court bench of metropolitan magistrate Mohammad Baki Billah granted her interim bail in the case filed by the health ministry under the Official Secrets Act, which would last till July 15, 2021. The bail was granted upon a bond of BDT 5,000 (±US$59), and the submission of her passport to the court.
