= Matiur Rahman (journalist) =

Bangladeshi journalist, publisher

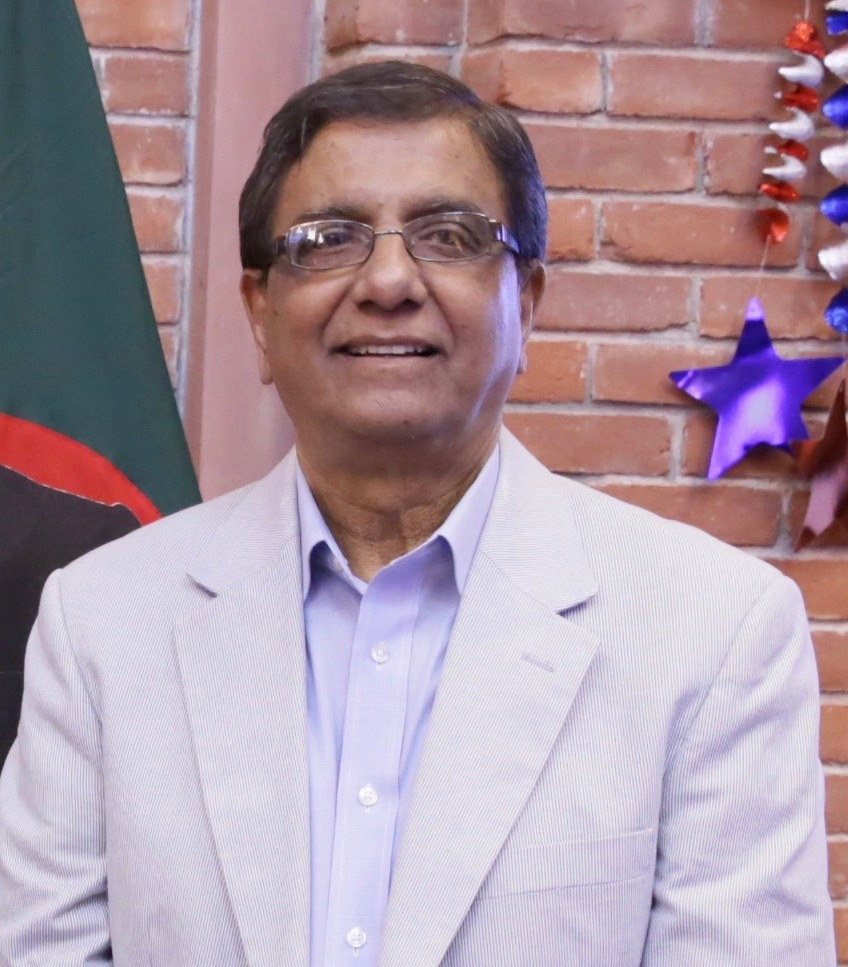
- Rahman in 2018
- Born: 15 April 1946 (age 80); Calcutta, Bengal Presidency, British India
- Education: Dhaka College; University of Dhaka
- Occupations: Journalist, editor
- Years active: 1970–present
- Movement: Marxism
- Spouse: Maleka Begum
- Awards: Ramon Magsaysay Award

Matiur Rahman (Bengali: মতিউর রহমান; born 15 April 1946) is the editor of Prothom Alo, one of the largest circulated Bengali language daily in Bangladesh. He is the recipient of the 2005 Ramon Magsaysay Award in the journalism, literature and creative communication arts category.

== Early life ==
Rahman was born 2 January 1946 in Calcutta to Mohammed Fazlur Rahman, a lawyer, and Lutfunessa Begum. For his secondary education, he attended Nawabpur Government High School and then Dhaka College. For his higher education, he attended the University of Dhaka and earned his master's degree in statistics in 1967. While a student, he became a Marxist and was a student leader in East Pakistan Student Union. Later, he was secretly a member of Communist Party of Bangladesh while it was still outlawed.

== Career ==
Rahman entered journalism in 1970 when he became the editor of Ekota, a socialist weekly. For five years during the 1970s, he also published the Bangladesh edition of the journal World Marxist Review. He left that position after 21 years and after the fall of the East Bloc. After he left Ekota, he worked as a journalist for newspaper Ajker Kagoj. In February 1992, he partnered with others to found Bhorer Kagoj, which he edited for the next six years. After Saber Hossain Chowdhury joined the cabinet of the Awami League government, Rahman felt pressured to shape the newspaper's stance in accordance with the ruling party and this led to his resignation. In 1998, he founded Prothom Alo, a daily newspaper.

On 12 February 2013, Rahman was wounded from broken glass while in his car when some men were rioting and vandalising cars.

He was elected president of the Newspaper Owners' Association of Bangladesh in June 2014. In March 2023, Matiur Rahman was sued under the controversial Digital Security Act. Reporter Samsuzzaman Shams, an 'assistant cameraman' and unnamed others were also made accused in the case.

== Criticism ==
In December 2024, Simin Rahman of Transcom Group was accused by his younger sister of embezzling her deceased father's shares through non-judicial stamp fraud. On 18 May 2025, Elias Hossain's YouTube investigative report program called Fifteen Minutes was shown, stating that Simin Rahman was unethically assisted by Prothom Alo editor Matiur Rahman and Daily Star's Mahfuz Anam in this matter along with publishing false news, and Asif Nazrul dismissed the case without investigation due to his good relations with them. Zulkarnain Saer Khan also criticised Matiur Rahman and Mahfuz Anam for involving in this matter. Matiur Rahman, Anisul Haque and Mahfuz Anam also helped Simin giving advice to donate on making Bollywood film Faraaz with a false narrative to hide the information about his son Faraz being a militant in 2016 Dhaka Holey Artisan attack, instead showing him as a saviour hero.
