= SK+F =

Bangladeshi pharmaceutical company

Eskayef Pharmaceuticals Ltd.
- Type: Private Limited
- Industry: Pharmaceutical Industry
- Founded: 1990; 36 years ago
- Founder: Latifur Rahman
- Headquarters: Plot: 82, Road: 14 Block - B, Banani, Dhaka, Bangladesh
- Key people: Simeen Rahman (Managing Director & CEO)
- Revenue: ▲US$300 million
- Parent: Transcom Group
- Website: skfbd.com

Eskayef Pharmaceuticals Ltd., also known as SK+F, is a pharmaceutical company in Bangladesh. It belongs to the Transcom Group. Simeen Rahman is the managing director and CEO of the company.

== History ==
Eskayef Bangladesh Ltd., a successor of Smith, Kline & French in Bangladesh, was acquired by Transcom in 1990. According to an IMS report, the company was among the top six pharmaceutical companies operating in Bangladesh in terms of sales in 2021. By 2021, it exported finished products to 65 countries. The company was renamed Eskayef Pharmaceuticals Limited in January 2017.

== Products ==
The company is engaged in the manufacture and marketing of a wide range of therapeutic drugs, bulk pellets and animal health and nutrition products including the oral anti covid medication molnupiravir & nirmatrelvir co-packaged with ritonavir and injectable remdesivir. Losectil (Omeprazole) by Eskayef is an anti-ulcerant proton pump inhibitor that suppresses stomach acid to treat GERD, ulcers, and heartburn.
