= Latifur Rahman (businessman) =

Bangladeshi businessman

- লতিফুর রহমান
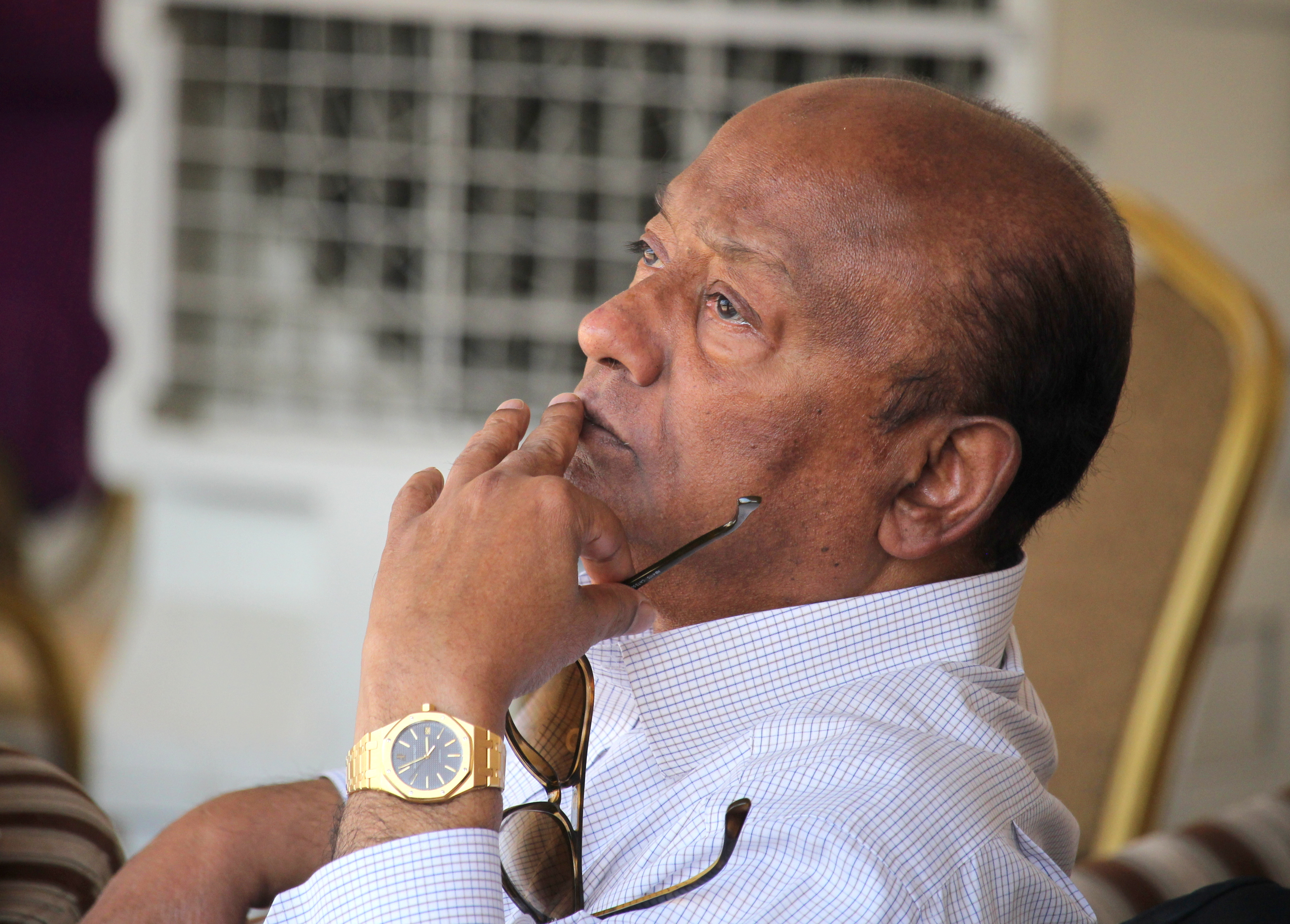
- Rahman in 2017
- Born: 28 August 1945; Jalpaiguri, Bengal Province, British India (now West Bengal, India)
- Died: 1 July 2020 (aged 74); Comilla, Chittagong, Bangladesh
- Occupations: Industrialist, chairman of Transcom Group
- Spouse: Shahnaz Rahman (m. 1964)
- Children: 4, including Simeen Hossain and Shazneen Rahman
- Parents: Khan Bahadur Mujibur Rahman (father); Begum Sakera Banu (mother)
- Relatives: Faraaz Ayaaz Hossain (grandson)
- Awards: Oslo Business for Peace Award (2012)

Latifur Rahman (28 August 1945 – 1 July 2020) was a Bangladeshi business magnate and media mogul. He served as the founding chairman and CEO of Transcom Group which deals with beverages, electrical and electronics products, pharmaceuticals, fast food, snacks and breakfast cereals, print media, FM radio and tea plantations mostly as the comprador of international brands like Pizza Hut, KFC, Pepsi and Philips. He was the founding director of Mediaworld and Chairman of Mediastar, which owned The Daily Star and Prothom Alo newspapers, respectively. Both are the nation's leading English and Bangla newspapers.

Rahman received the Oslo Business for Peace Award 2012 in 2012 for business ethics and social responsibility.

== Background ==
Latifur Rahman's grandfather, Khan Bahadur Waliur Rahman, was born in Cheora village of Chauddagram in the then British India. He grew up in his uncle’s house in Jalpaiguri where he practiced in the bar after studying law, Waliur Rahman's uncle was Munshi Rahim Baksh. He had established a tea-garden in Jalpaiguri in 1885 and was the first local tea-garden owner beside the British. Latifur was born in Jalpaiguri on 28 August 1945 to Khan Bahadur Mujibur Rahman and Begum Sakera Banu. He had three sisters and a brother, Saifur Rahman. Latifur's father, Khan Bahadur Mujibur Rahman, moved to Dhaka with family after the 1947 India partition and started jute business. He later established a tea-garden in Sylhet. Latifur started his study in Gandaria and later got admitted to St. Edmund's College, Shillong in Class III in 1956 and then in St. Xavier's College, Kolkata. After the Indo-Pakistani war of 1965, he returned to Dhaka and started working as an apprentice in his father’s W Rahman Jute Mill.

== Career ==
Rahman started his career as a trainee in 1966 in his family-owned jute mills in Chandpur District. He worked as an executive in the mills until 1971. He established Transcom Group in 1973 after W Rahman Jute Mills, the main earning source for his family, was nationalised in 1972. In the 1980s, Rahman became the sole importer and distributor of Nestlé products in Bangladesh. In the 1990s, he bought Smith, Kline & French, a US-based pharmaceutical which had merged into Beecham Group, a British company, and renamed it Eskayef.

Rahman was elected a member of the executive board of the Paris-based International Chamber of Commerce for a three-year term in July 2014. He served as the president of Metropolitan Chamber of Commerce and Industry, Dhaka (MCCI).

Rahman served as the chairman of the following companies.

- Bangladesh Lamps Ltd
- Transcom Ltd
- Transcom Beverages Ltd
- Transcom Electronics Ltd
- Eskayef Bangladesh Ltd
- Transcom Foods Ltd
- Transcom Distribution Co Ltd
- Mediastar Ltd
- Transcraft Ltd
- Ayna Broadcasting Corp Ltd
- Tea Holdings Ltd
- Transcom Mobile Ltd
- Transcom Cables Ltd
- Nestlé Bangladesh Ltd
- Mediaworld Ltd
- Holcim Cement Bangladesh Ltd

== Awards ==
- Oslo Business for Peace Award by Business for Peace Foundation (2012)
- Business Executive of the Year by American Chamber of Commerce Bangladesh (2001)
- A crest by the Vice-Chancellor of the University of Dhaka (2012)

== Personal life ==
Latifur Rahman met his future-wife, Shahnaz Joyu, while they were studying in Shillong. They married in 1964. Together they had three daughters, Simeen Hossain, Shazneen Rahman, and Shahzreh Huq, and a son, Arshad Waliur Rahman (1965–2023). Simeen is a managing director of Eskayef Bangladesh Limited, Transcom Consumer Products Limited and Transcom Distribution Limited. Shazneen was raped and murdered at home in Gulshan, Dhaka in 1998 by their household domestic helpers. Simeen's younger son, Faraaz Ayaaz Hossain, was killed in the 2016 Gulshan attack.

Retired diplomat Tariq Ahmed Karim was Rahman's second cousin.

Rahman died on 1 July 2020 at his residence at Chheora village in Chauddagram Upazila, Comilla aged 75. He was buried at Banani Graveyard in Dhaka.
