= Transcom Group =

Bangladeshi conglomerate

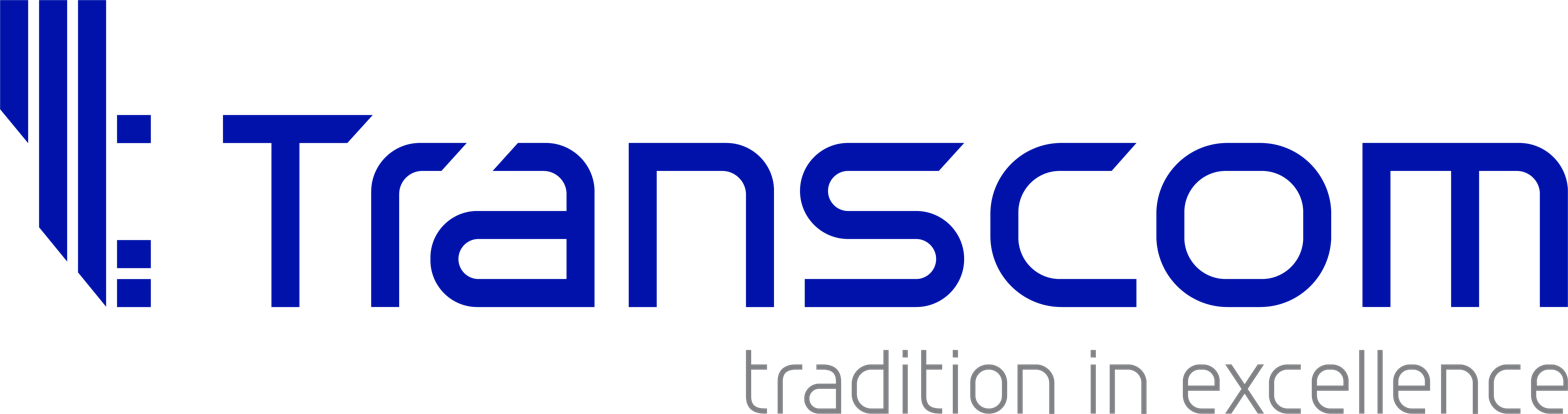
- Native name: ট্রান্সকম গ্রুপ
- Company type: Private
- Industry: Conglomerate
- Founded: 1981
- Founder: Latifur Rahman
- Headquarters: Dhaka, Bangladesh
- Area served: Bangladesh to 67 Countries
- Key people: Shahnaz Rahman (Chairman); Simeen Rahman (CEO)
- Products: Pharmaceuticals, Beverages, Distribution & Logistics, Consumer Goods, Restaurant Franchise, Electronics, Printing, Media
- Revenue: ▲US$600 million (2020)
- Number of employees: 20,000
- Subsidiaries: Eskayef Pharmaceuticals Ltd; Prothom Alo; The Daily Star; Chorki
- Website: www.transcombd.com

Transcom Limited is a Bangladeshi business conglomerate. The businesses under this group include beverages, pharmaceuticals, newspapers, electronics, restaurants, distribution, etc. Transcom is the local agent or comprador of international brands. This group employs more than 20,000 people. Transcom Group is one of the oldest and biggest companies in Bangladesh. The family business operations initially started in 1878 with tea plantations. Munshi Rahim Baksh, was the first Muslim individual to own and operate tea plantations in the subcontinent. He then brought his nephew Khan Bahadur Waliur Rahman into the business who had expanded the operations. His son Khan Bahadur Mujibur Rahman, further grew the tea businesses and also engaged himself in the jute and trading. His sons Latifur Rahman and Saifur Rahman founded the present day Transcom Group of Companies in 1981 along with Shahnaz Rahman and AS Mahmud.

== History ==
Latifur Rahman established Transcom Group in 1973 after W Rahman Jute Mills, the major earning source for the Rahman family, was nationalised in 1972. This diversified business house now has interests in many segments in the industrial and service sectors in Bangladesh. Transcom is the local agent or comprador of international brands like Pizza Hut, KFC, Pepsi and Philips, etc. Leading Danish insulin manufacturer Novo Nordisk has also chosen Transcoms pharmaceutical company Eskayef as the sole manufacturer of its products after China and India in Asia.

Some of the foreign brands managed by the group include: Pepsi, 7Up, Mirinda, Mountain Dew, Diet Pepsi, 7up Light, Aquafina, Sting, Evervess, KFC, Pizza Hut, Philips N.V, Whirlpool, Maybelline, Garnier, Heinz, Frito-Lay, Lindt, Servier, Novo Nordisk.

Transcom Group also owns two major newspapers, The Daily Prothom Alo and The Daily Star, and an FM radio channel, ABC Radio, to advocate in favour of their business policy.

Some other ventures by Transcom Group include pharmaceuticals (Eskayef Pharmaceuticals Ltd.), distribution (Transcom Distribution Company ltd), etc.

The chairman and CEO of Transcom Group, Latifur Rahman, won the 2012 Oslo Business for Peace Award for maintaining commitment to social responsibility and ethical values. Rahman was also the vice president of ICC Bangladesh, and chairman of Nestlé Bangladesh, Holcim Bangladesh and National Housing Finance and Investments. He was a director of Linde Bangladesh (formerly British Oxygen) and member of the governing board of BRAC, the world's largest non-governmental organization.

== List of companies ==
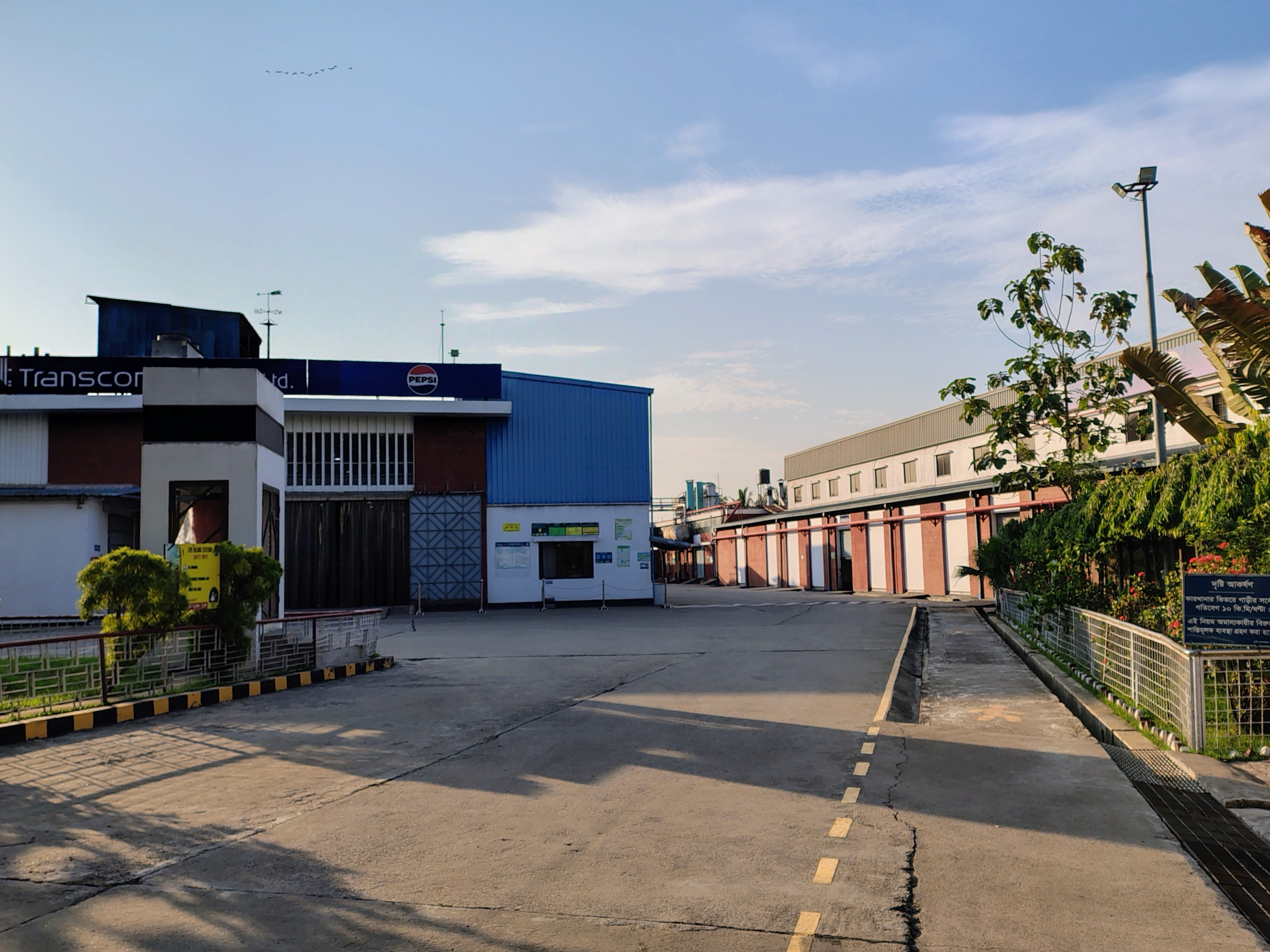
Transcom Beverage plant in Kalurghat, Chittagong

=== Companies ===
- Transcom Ltd.
- Reliance Insurance Limited
- Eskayef Pharmaceuticals Ltd.
- Transcom Beverages Limited (PepsiCo and its subsidiaries)
- Transcom Consumer Products Limited (PepsiCo, Mars, Conagra Brands, Kraft Heinz and its subsidiaries)
- Transcom Distribution Company Ltd. (L'Oréal)
- Transcom Electronics Limited (Samsung, Hitachi, Siemens etc.)
- Bangladesh Lamps Limited (BLL); is one of the oldest organization of the Transcom Group. Bangladesh Lamps Limited was established in Bangladesh in the year of 1962 at the time of East Pakistan, as East Pakistan Lamps Limited. They started the production of Philips GLS (General Lighting Services). BLL has other two production unit those are FTL(Fluorescent Tubular Lighting) and CFL(Compact Fluorescent Lighting). In 1993, Transcom purchased it. CFL Production unit started in 2008 and FTL started its production at 2011. The product of both CFL and FTL production units are branded as Transtec CFL and Transtec Tube Light. Almost 600 employees are working in BLL .It is enlisted as Engineering Firm in the Dhaka stock exchange.
- Bangladesh Electrical Industries Ltd.
- Transcom Foods Limited (Pizza Hut & KFC)
- Mediastar Ltd.
  - Prothom Alo (major newspaper in Bangladesh)
  - ABC Radio (major private radio station in Bangladesh)
  - Chorki (major OTT platform in Bangladesh)
  - Biggan Chinta (teen's science magazine)
  - Kishor Alo (teen's magazine)
- Transcraft Limited
- Tea Holdings Ltd.
- Trinco Ltd.
- Transfin Ltd.
- Monipur Tea Co. Ltd.
- Marina Tea Co. Ltd.
- M.Rahman Tea Co. Ltd.

=== Associates ===
- Mediaworld Ltd.
  - The Daily Star

== Criticism ==
In December 2024, Simin Rahman of Transcom Group was accused by her younger sister of embezzling her deceased father's shares through non-judicial stamp fraud. On 18 May 2025, Elias Hossain's YouTube investigative report program called Fifteen Minutes was shown, stating that Simin Rahman was unethically assisted by Prothom Alo editor Matiur Rahman and Daily Star's Mahfuz Anam in this matter, and Asif Nazrul dismissed the case without investigation due to his good relations with them.

== See also ==
- List of companies of Bangladesh
