= Rožina =

Rožina Рожина
- Village
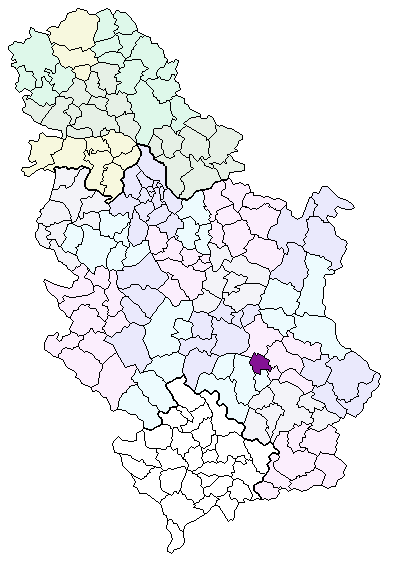
- Location of Merošina municipality in Serbia

- Location within Serbia
- Country: Serbia
- District: Nišava
- Municipality: Merošina

Population (2002)
  - Total: 753
- Time zone: UTC+1 (CET)
  - Summer (DST): UTC+2 (CEST)

Rožina is a village situated in Merošina municipality in Serbia. According to the census of 2002, there were 753 people (according to the census of 1991, there were 805 inhabitants).

== Demographics ==
In Rožina, there are 612 adult residents, and the average age is 43.4 years (41.9 for males and 45.0 for females). The village has 215 households, and the average number of members per household is 3.50. It is largely populated by Serbs (according to 2002 census), and in the last three censuses, noticed a decline in population.
