= Prothom Alo =

Bangladeshi daily newspaper

- First issue of Prothom Alo, 4 November 1998
- Type: Daily newspaper
- Format: Broadsheet
- Owner: Transcom Group
- Publisher: Matiur Rahman
- Editor-in-chief: Matiur Rahman
- Founded: 4 November 1998
- Language: Bangla and English
- Headquarters: Progoti Insurance Bhobon, 20-21, Kawran Bazar, Dhaka - 1215, Bangladesh
- Country: Bangladesh
- Circulation: 525,001 (January 2013)
- Website: www.prothomalo.com; en.prothomalo.com

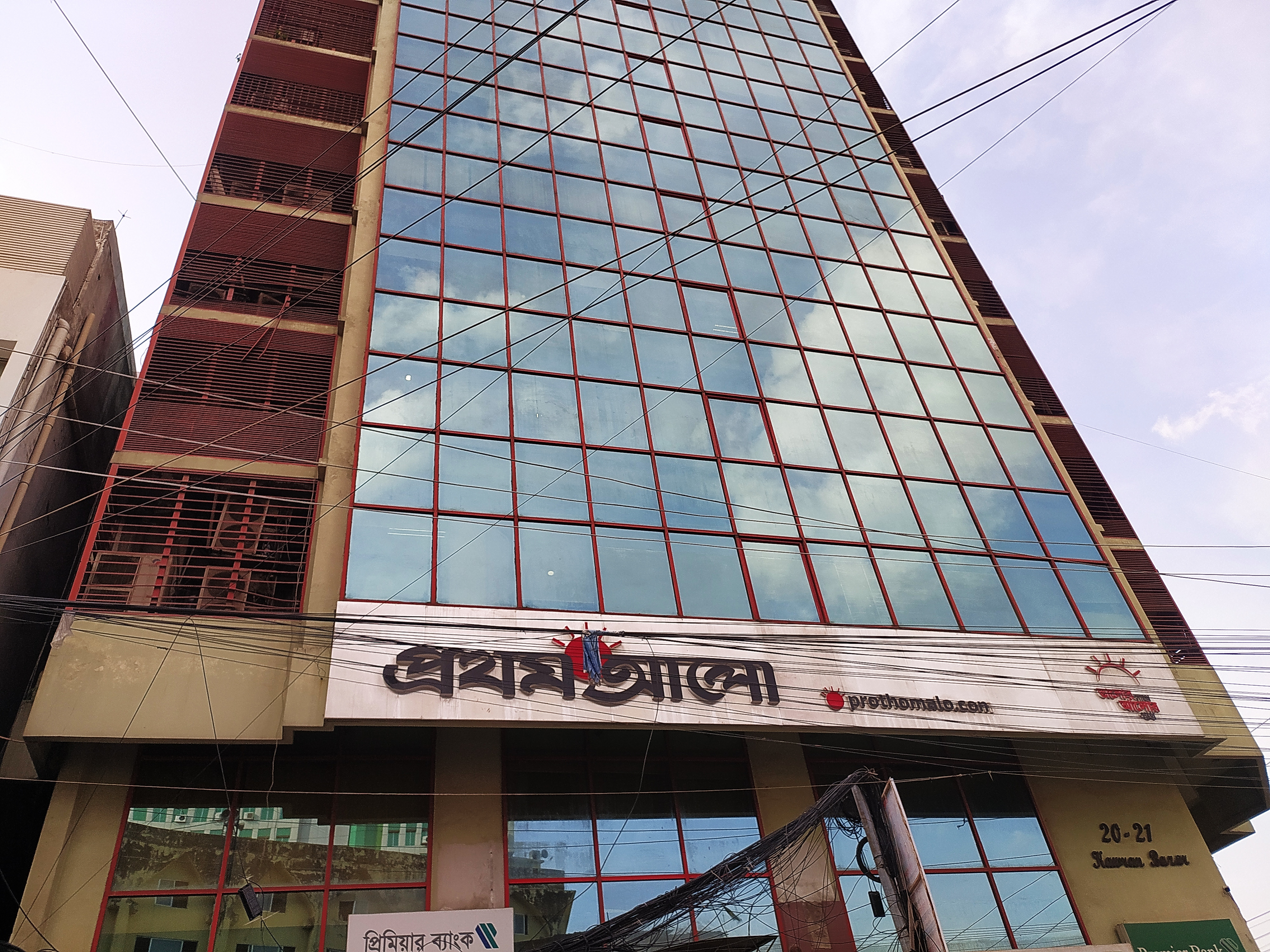
Prothom Alo building

Prothom Alo (Bengali: প্রথম আলো) is a Bengali-language daily newspaper in Bangladesh, published from Dhaka. It is one of the most widely circulated newspapers in Bangladesh. According to the National Media Survey of 2018, conducted by Kantar MRB Bangladesh, Prothom Alo has a daily readership of more than 6.6 million online. According to Alexa Internet, an American web traffic analysis company, the online portal of Prothom Alo is the most visited Bengali website in the world. The paper failed to print the 19 December 2025 issue for the first time during its 27 years of operation due to an attack on its office and bureaus.

== History ==
Prothom Alo was founded on 4 November 1998. The circulation of Prothom Alo grew from an initial circulation of 42,000 to a circulation of a half million copies. The newspaper distinguished itself by its investigations of acid attacks and violence against women and pushing for tougher laws against the sale of acid. From press facilities located in Dhaka, Chittagong and Bogra, around 5,00,000 copies (as of March '2014) are circulated each day. According to National Media Survey 2018, everyday 6.6 million people read the print edition of Prothom Alo. The claimed readership of the online and print edition of this newspaper is 7.6 million.

A senior reporter of Prothom Alo, Rozina Islam, was detained for 5 hours in Bangladesh Secretariat after she went there to cover the health ministry on 17 May 2021. A case was filed against her by an official of Health Service Division under the Official Secrets Act. After filing of the case she was taken to Shahbagh Police Station. She was interrogated for 5 days in police remand. She was released upon bail from Kashimpur prison on 23 May 2021.

== Digital platforms ==
The online portal of Prothom Alo is the number 1 Bangladeshi website in the world. This portal is accessed by 1.6 million visitors from 200 countries and territories across the globe with 60 million pageviews per month. The e-paper site of Prothom Alo is also the Number 1 e-paper Web site of Bangladesh.

== Editors ==
Since its founding in 1998, Matiur Rahman is the chief editor of the newspaper. He received the Ramon Magsaysay Award in 2005 in the category of Journalism, Literature and Creative Communication Arts.

== Mathematics Olympiad ==
Prothom Alo helped to popularise mathematics in Bangladesh. It organized Mathematics Olympiad for the first time in Bangladesh in 2003. It is one of the main sponsors and the main organizer of Bangladesh Mathematics Olympiad.

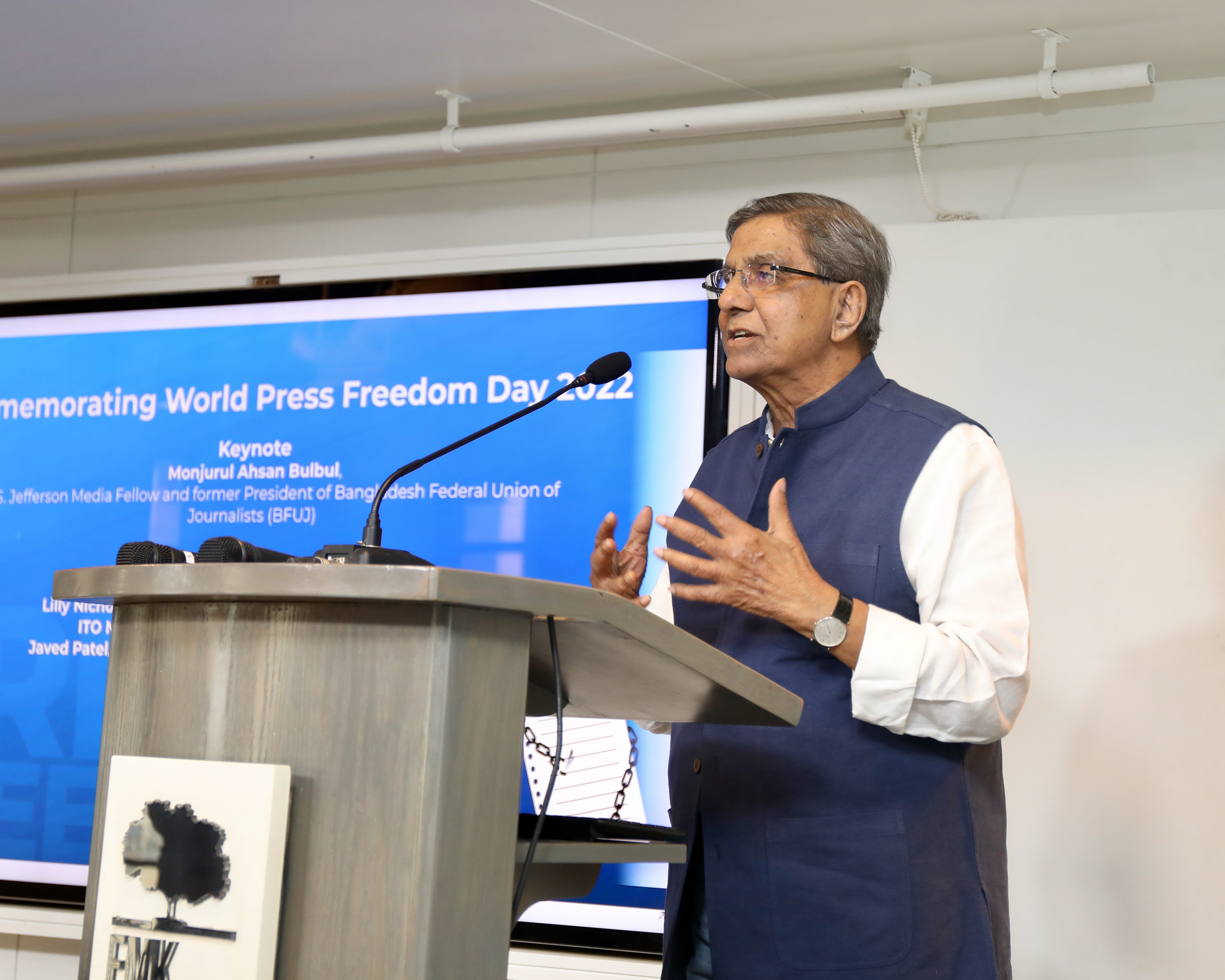
Matiur Rahman, the editor of Prothom Alo

== Recognition ==
Prothom Alo has been carrying on a campaign against acid violence, drugs, HIV/AIDS, and religious terrorism. For its contribution to this fight, the Philippines-based Ramon Magsaysay Award Foundation has described editor Matiur Rahman as 'the guiding force in the positive changes in society and culture' and in 2005 honored him with a Magsaysay Award, which is considered to be the 'Nobel Prize of Asia'. Rahman donated the prize money in equal proportion to the three funds that the Prothom Alo Trust has set up to help and support acid-burnt women, anti-drug campaigns, and persecuted journalists. They won the 'Best in South Asia' award at the INMA Global Media Awards 2025 by the International News Media Association (INMA), the largest global platform of media organizations. In 2026, Prothom Alo won a gold award in the “Best Marketing Campaign for a News Brand” category at the WAN-IFRA Digital Media Awards South Asia for its campaign “HHH: Heads Held High”, and also received a silver award for Best Use of Video.

== Sister concerns ==
Prothom Alo, which belongs to Mediastar Ltd., has the following sister concerns:

- ABC Radio FM 89.2: Commercial operation of ABC Radio FM 89.2 commenced from 7 January 2009. It is one of the most popular FM radio channels of Dhaka city. Besides Dhaka, it is also being aired from Chittagong and Cox's Bazar stations.
- Prothoma Prokashon : Prothoma Prokashon is a publication house that started its journey in 2008. This publication house has been highly praised by different quarters for its quality publication works. Prothoma Prokashon received awards from Bangla Academy in 2011, 2012 and 2013.
- Prothoma Boier Dunia: Prothoma Boier Dunia or Prothoma World of Books is a bookselling outlet with five stores in Dhaka, Chittagong and Rajshahi.
- Protichinta: Protichinta is a quarterly journal on social, economic, and political issues.
- Kishor Alo : Kishor Alo, a monthly magazine for youngsters, started its journey in October 2013. Stories, novels, poems, quizzes, magic, adventures, traveling, science, jokes, and many other interesting features are published in this colorful monthly magazine. Kishor Alo also has a large number of volunteers all over Bangladesh.
- Biggan Chinta : Biggan Chinta a monthly magazine for science lovers, started its journey from October 2016. It contains science writings (mainly about astrophysics and environmental science), interviews with scientists, science fiction and many others.
- Chakri.com (former Prothom Alo Jobs): Chakri.com offers regular recruitment circulars and solutions, corporate training services, and career counseling.

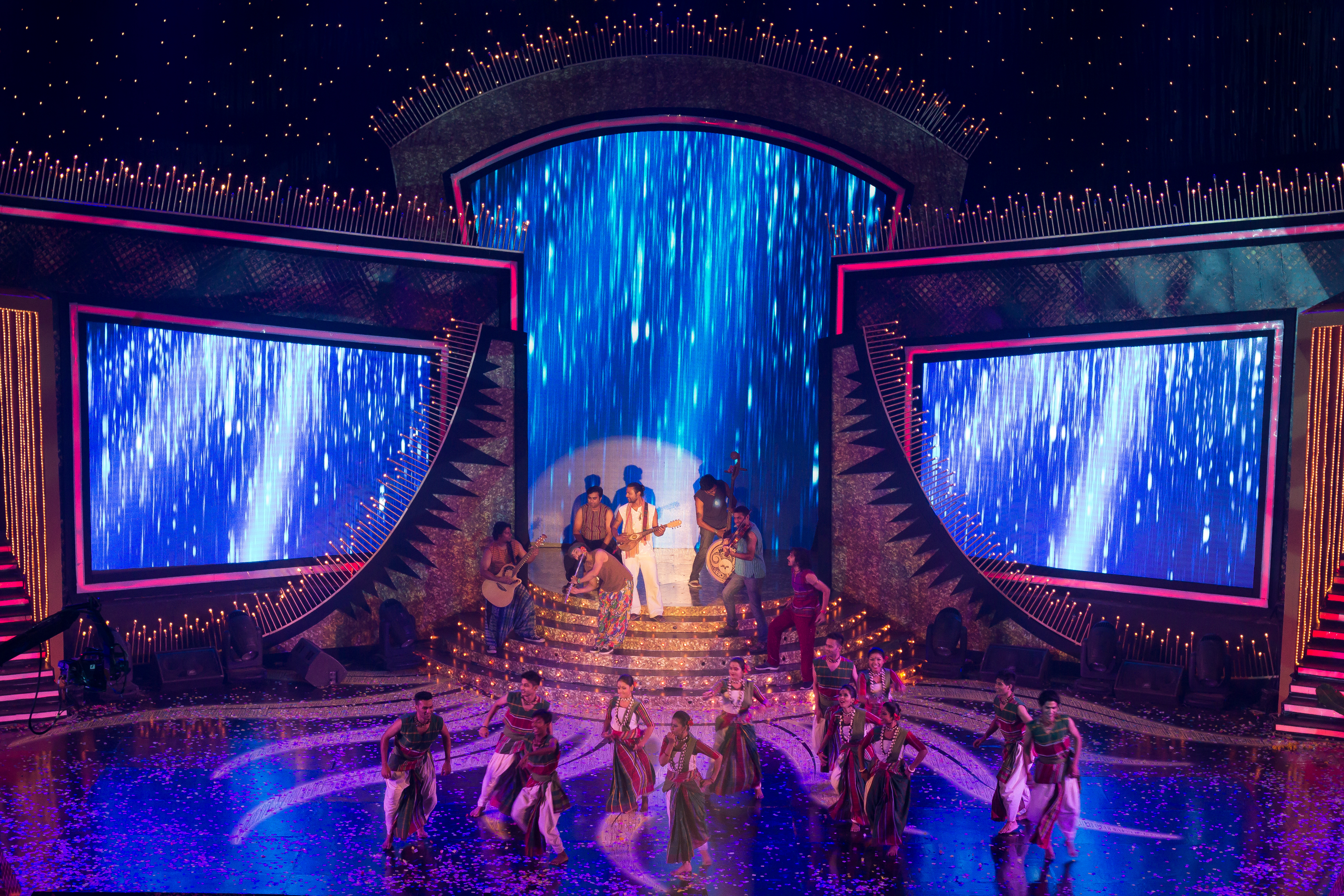
Meril-Prothom Alo Award Giving Ceremony, Bangabandhu International Conference Centre (BICC)

== Controversy and criticism ==
=== Religious and social disputes ===
Prothom Alo has faced repeated criticism and protests from Islamic organizations and parties over content alleged to be disrespectful to religious sentiments. In 2007, the newspaper's satirical magazine Alpin published a cartoon that was perceived as mocking a name associated with Muhammad. The publication sparked nationwide protests by Islamists, leading the government to impose a temporary ban on the magazine. The organization issued an apology, and the cartoonist was arrested on 18 September 2007, jailed for six months, and released in March 2008. In 2010, the book Gadya Cartoon by Anisul Hoque, published by the organization, faced allegations of satirizing Quranic verses. Islamic critics and media outlets demanded its withdrawal, accusing the paper of undermining religious values.

In late 2024, tensions resurfaced after the newspaper was accused of labeling Islamists as "militants" in its reporting. On 24 November 2024, Islamic organizations protested outside the newspaper's headquarters in Karwan Bazar. The protests escalated into violence; an attempt was made to attack the Chittagong office, and the Rajshahi and Bogura offices were vandalized, with signboards removed or set on fire. The executive editor dismissed the allegations as baseless, suggesting the protests were orchestrated attacks on independent journalism. The attacks were condemned by the Newspaper Owners' Association of Bangladesh (NOAB), the Committee to Protect Journalists (CPJ), and other media bodies as severe violations of press freedom.

=== Political and legal challenges ===
The newspaper has encountered significant legal and political backlash over its reporting. In March 2023, a report on the rising cost of living during Ramadan drew controversy due to a discrepancy between a photograph of a child and the accompanying text. Although the paper corrected the error and removed the post, a case was filed under the Digital Security Act (DSA) against the editor, Matiur Rahman, and a reporter, alleging tarnishing of the state's image. Prime Minister Sheikh Hasina publicly labeled the newspaper an "enemy" of the people. Rahman was later granted bail, an event Amnesty International cited as part of a pattern of press harassment.

Previously, in 2012, the High Court issued an injunction regarding the publication of Humayun Ahmed's novel Deyal in the paper, questioning its portrayal of the assassination of Sheikh Mujibur Rahman. A 2007 editorial by Rahman criticizing the BNP-Jamaat alliance also drew criticism from Islamist groups. More recently, outlets such as Somoy News and Bangladesh Pratidin have accused Prothom Alo of bias and shifting political allegiances, allegations made amidst a broader context of pressure on independent media.

=== Management and corporate allegations ===
The newspaper and its management have faced scrutiny over operational safety and the alleged conduct of its parent company, Transcom Group. On 1 November 2019, Naimul Abrar, a student at Dhaka Residential Model College, was electrocuted during an event organized by the newspaper's magazine Kishor Alo. A police investigation cited negligence, leading a court to issue arrest warrants for the editor and others in January 2020.

Separately, allegations have been directed at Transcom Group CEO Simeen Rahman regarding financial irregularities. Accusations have surfaced claiming attempts to bribe former Prime Minister Sheikh Hasina to suppress legal cases, as well as allegations of embezzling family shares through stamp fraud. Critics have alleged that editor Matiur Rahman and The Daily Star editor Mahfuz Anam unethically assisted in these matters.

== Attack and arson at Prothom Alo’s head office ==
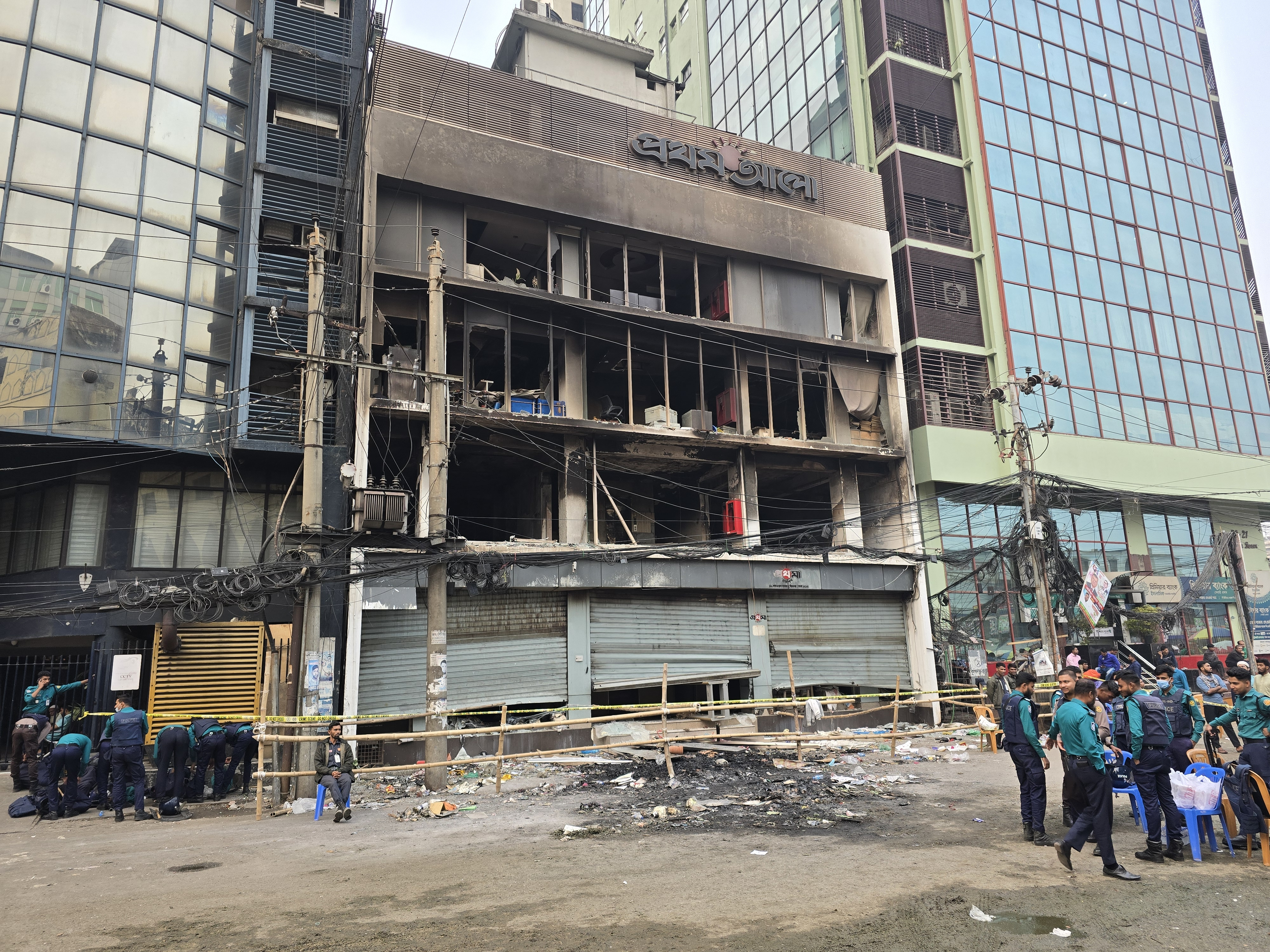
Burnt exterior of Prothom Alo's office.

On 18 December 2025, the headquarters of Prothom Alo (Pragati Bhaban) in Karwan Bazar, Dhaka, was subjected to vandalism and arson following the death of Inqilab Mancha spokesperson Sharif Osman Hadi.

Late that night, a mob marched from Shahbag to the Karwan Bazar area, targeting the newspaper's office. Witnesses reported that the attackers, described as a group of extremist youths, scaled the building's grille, vandalized the reception area, and damaged windows. They subsequently set fire to furniture and documents in front of the entrance.

Police attempted to intervene but failed to fully control the situation. Several journalists and staff members were reported to be trapped inside the building during the violence.

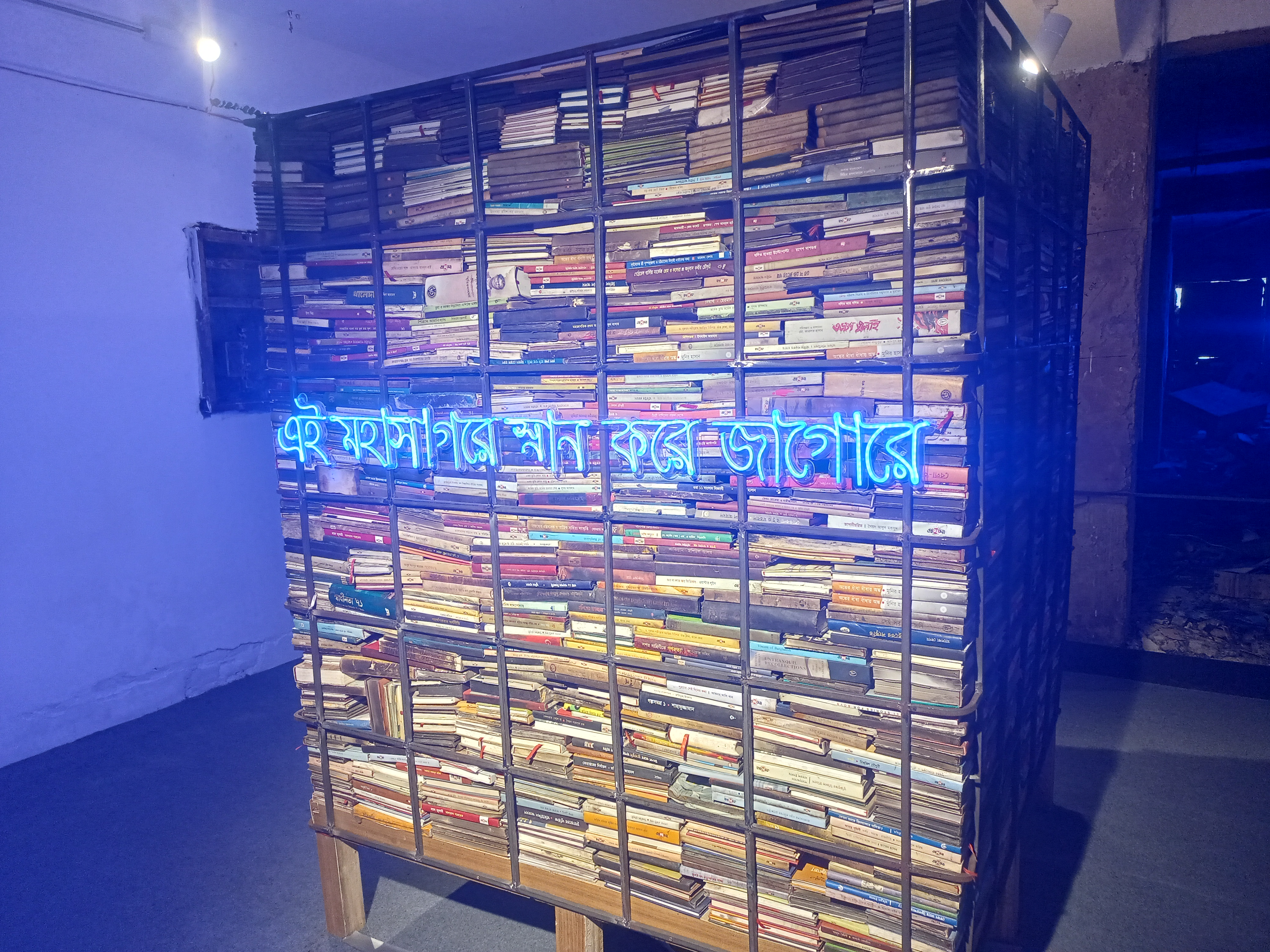
An exhibition on Prothom Alo Attack 2026

According to Prothom Alo, the attack was carried out in a deliberate and organized manner. In February 2026, An analysis by The Daily Star and Dismislab examined Facebook posts circulating before, during, and after mob attacks on The Daily Star and Prothom Alo, describing a pattern of online incitement that escalated into real-world violence.

The arson resulted in extensive damage to the building, destroying assets stored inside, including valuable documents. The organization characterized the incident as an "organized terrorist attack," and Mahfuz Anam stated that fears for journalists' personal safety were now taking precedence over calls for freedom of expression. Anam too alleged that the incident was not a coincidence but "murderous" and intentional.

Chief Adviser of Bangladesh Muhammad Yunus described the incident as "tantamount to an attack on independent media" and said that "this incident has created a major obstacle to the country's democratic progress and the path of free journalism." The incident was also condemned by several organizations, including the Newspaper Owners’ Association of Bangladesh (NOAB), the Editors' Council, and Transparency International Bangladesh.

The EU ambassador to Bangladesh condemned the incident, calling it an attack on freedom of the media and on freedom of expression.

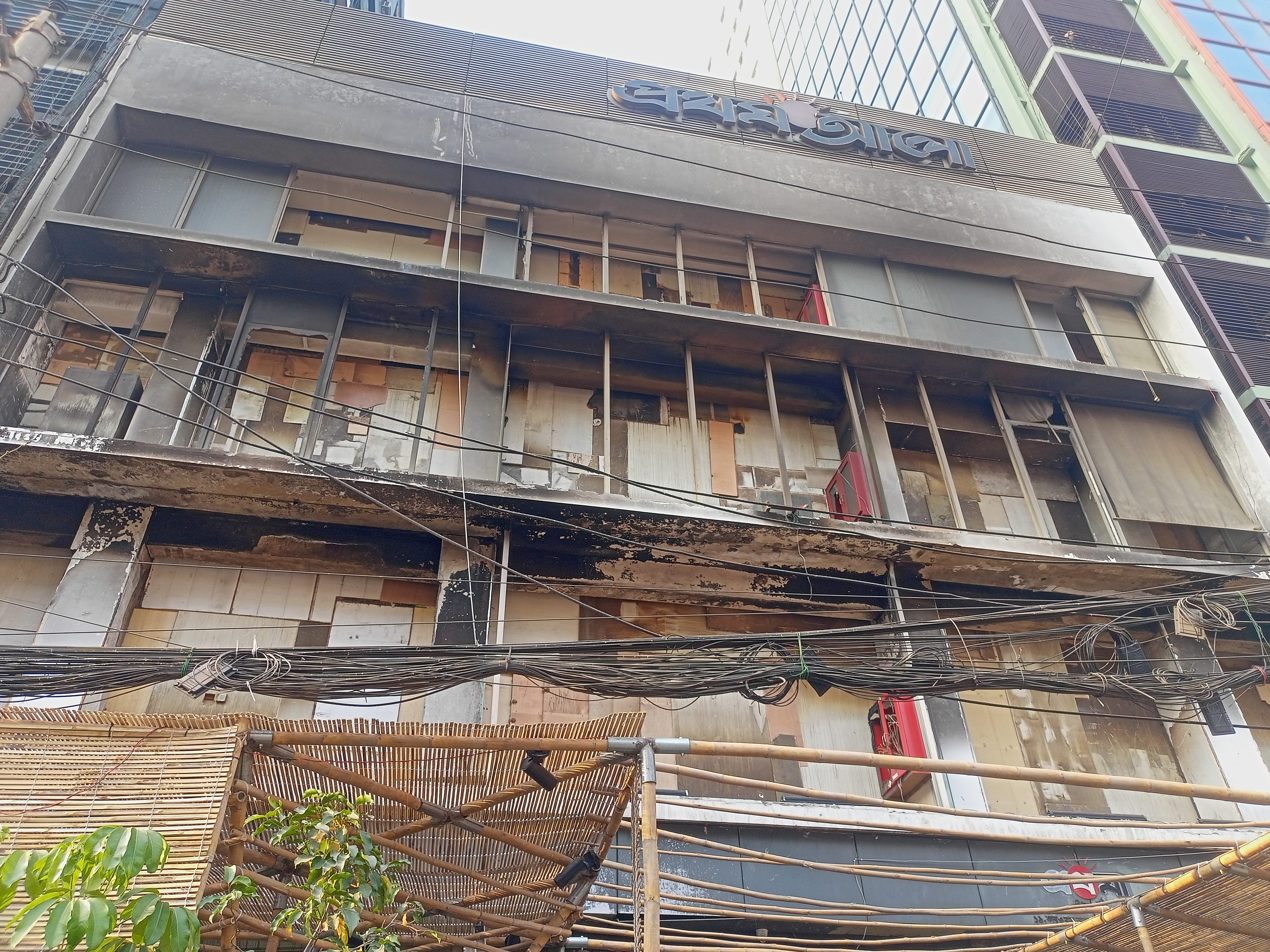
Prothom Alo building attack 2026

== See also ==
- List of newspapers in Bangladesh
