= Newspaper Owners' Association of Bangladesh =

Trade association of newspaper owners in Bangladesh

- Formation: 1972
- Type: Industry
- Headquarters: Dhaka, Bangladesh
- Official language: Bengali
- Leader: AK Azad
- Parent organization: Ha-Meem Group

Newspaper Owners' Association of Bangladesh (NOAB) (Bengali: বাংলাদেশ সংবাদপত্র মালিক সমিতি) is an industry trade association of newspaper owners in Bangladesh. The former President of Newspaper Owners' Association of Bangladesh is businessman AK Azad, publisher of the daily New Age and chairman of Ha-Meem Group. NOAB and Bangladesh Sangbadpatra Parishad together represent the interest of the print media industry in Bangladesh.

== History ==
In 2017, NOAB protested against section 57 of Digital Security Act which it believed would encourage censorship of the press.

In 2019, Newspaper Owners' Association of Bangladesh tried to stall the 9th wage board, which significantly increased the minimum wage of newspaper employees. This was protested by Bangladesh Federal Union of Journalists and Dhaka Union of Journalists. The association had filled an appeal with the Bangladesh Supreme Court against the implementation of the 9th wage board following a Bangladesh High Court verdict for the implementation of the 9th wage board. It had also sought the support of the Federation of Bangladesh Chambers of Commerce and Industry against the wage board.

The Association has campaigned against the import duty on newsprint and reduce the corporate tax from 35 percent. It has also called for the government to increase the rate for government advertisements.

Newspaper Owners' Association of Bangladesh announced on 25 March 2020 that newspapers do not spread COVID-19. The association sought a government stimulus package following the coronavirus caused lock down in Bangladesh. The former President of Newspaper Owners' Association of Bangladesh is Matiur Rahman, editor of the daily Prothom Alo.
