= The Daily Star (Bangladesh) =

English-language daily newspaper in Bangladesh

- Type: Daily newspaper
- Format: Broadsheet
- Owner: Transcom Group
- Founder: Syed Mohammad Ali
- Editor: Mahfuz Anam (Editor); Aasha Mehreen Amin (Joint Editor)
- Founded: 14 January 1991; 35 years ago
- Language: English
- Headquarters: 64–65, Kazi Nazrul Islam Avenue, Dhaka-1215
- Circulation: 29,450
- Website: thedailystar.net

The Daily Star is a Bangladeshi English-language daily newspaper. It is by far the largest circulating English-language newspaper in the country. Founded by Syed Mohammed Ali on 14 January 1991, as Bangladesh transitioned and restored parliamentary democracy, the newspaper became popular for its outspoken coverage of politics, corruption, and foreign policy. It is considered a newspaper of record for Bangladesh. The newspaper has been described as having a "reputation for journalistic integrity and liberal and progressive views - a kind of Bangladeshi New York Times".

Mahfuz Anam serves as the editor and publisher of The Daily Star. The Daily Star is owned by Mediaworld, in which a major share is held by the Transcom Group. Star Business, the business edition of the paper, is highly popular. The newspaper serves its Bengali readership digitally through its website.

== History ==
In the late 1980s, plans for a major English newspaper in Bangladesh were drawn up by Syed Mohammad Ali and Mahfuz Anam in Bangkok. Ali previously served as Editor of The Bangkok Post in Thailand and the Hong Kong Standard in British Hong Kong. Anam was working in UNESCO when he teamed up with Ali to establish a newspaper in Bangladesh. They secured funding from leading Bangladeshi financiers, including Azimur Rahman, A. S. Mahmud, Latifur Rahman, A. Rouf Chowdhury and Shamsur Rahman.

The newspaper was set up in 1991, which coincided with Bangladesh's return to parliamentary democracy after 15 years of military rule and presidential government. The Daily Star gained popularity for its outspoken coverage of politics in Bangladesh, including the rivalry between the Awami League led by Sheikh Hasina and the Bangladesh Nationalist Party (BNP) led by Khaleda Zia. It became the country's largest circulating English-language newspaper and quickly overtook The Bangladesh Observer and Weekly Holiday. It gained a wide readership in Dhaka and Chittagong, particularly among the urban elites, the business community and the diplomatic community.

In 2007, The Daily Star editor Mahfuz Anam called out army chief General Moeen U Ahmed for suggesting political reforms, arguing that it was beyond the mandate of the army chief to speak about politics. In a widely read commentary titled "This is no way to strengthen democracy", Anam also blasted the military-backed caretaker government for the arrest of Sheikh Hasina in 2007. In 2009, an investigative report by The Daily Star implicated former Prime Minister Khaleda Zia's son Tarique Rahman and close aides from Hawa Bhaban in the 2004 Dhaka grenade attack. Tarique Rahman was later sentenced to life imprisonment for his role in the attack.

In 2015, the government of Prime Minister Sheikh Hasina suspended all tender notices and government adverts in The Daily Star as a pressure tactic because government advertisements generate a significant share of revenue for the newspaper; this suspension was later lifted.

In February 2021, following the release of the documentary All the Prime Minister's Men by Al Jazeera Investigations, the newspaper treated it with skepticism, while also commending the government for not trying to block the report from being viewed from within the country as the newspaper considered such measures to be no longer effective. Subsequently, a commentary by Mahfuz Anam criticized army chief General Aziz Ahmed for controversial remarks in which Aziz suggested that criticizing the army chief was tantamount to criticizing Prime Minister Sheikh Hasina.

On 22 April 2022, Anam wrote a commentary titled "Can we really have a free and fair election?" in which he lamented Bangladesh's democratic backsliding. Throughout 2022 and 2023, Anam wrote a series of articles on the importance of free and fair elections, press freedom, the Digital Security Act (which was repealed), the role of the bureaucracy, political history, political parties and the Bangladesh Election Commission. After the July Revolution, the newspaper continued placing a critical lens on the policies of the interim government.

=== 2025 Vandalism ===
During the December 2025 Bangladesh violence, The Daily Star office was vandalized and set on fire by violent mobs, as unrest over the death of Sharif Osman Hadi, one of the founders and the leader of the political platform, Inqilab Moncho, escalated late on the night of 18 December 2025. On the midnight of 19 December, a mob of 100-200 people broke through the main gate of the building. The individuals stayed until 4:30 AM. According to witnesses, protesters blocked a Fire Service vehicle when it attempted to reach the office to extinguish the fire, forcing it to retreat. At least 28 journalists and office staff reportedly took shelter on the rooftop until they were evacuated after getting trapped for four hours. Firefighters brought the blaze under control.

As a result, the newspaper was unable to publish its print edition the next day, the first such instance in the newspaper's history. The Daily Star dubbed the incident "a dark day for independent journalism" and blamed the government's "relaxed attitude towards the safety and security of news outlets." European Union Ambassador to Bangladesh, Michael Miller called the attack a "terrible moment" for Bangladesh's democracy. Mahfuz Anam claimed that the attack was a "deliberate attempt" to take lives. The Islami Andolon Bangladesh (IAB) condemned the attack.

== Staff ==
Only two years after launching the newspaper, SM Ali died and a young Anam, who was Ali's protege, became the editor of the fledgling daily. As editor and publisher, Anam has been widely credited for steering the paper's editorial independence. Financial affairs are overseen by a six-member board of directors of the holding company Mediaworld Limited. Syed Fahim Munaim was the CEO and Managing Editor of the newspaper for many years. Munaim was credited for ensuring the financial independence of the paper.

Ahead of the 2024 general election in Bangladesh, the paper hired several pro-BNP journalists and writers, took an aggressively pro-BNP editorial stance, and strongly criticized the ruling Awami League. The election ended up being boycotted by the BNP amid allegations of a lack of a conducive environment for holding elections.

In 2023, Anam was appointed chairman of the holding company of The Daily Star after the death of longstanding chairperson Rokeya Afzal Rahman. Syed Ashfaqul Haque, who worked in both management and the newsroom for 31 years, was appointed as Executive Editor. Aasha Mehreen Amin, the granddaughter of Pakistan's last Bengali premier Nurul Amin, serves as the Joint Editor while S.S. Preetha is head of the Op-Ed section, which was previously headed by Zafar Sobhan. Amin continues to wield significant influence over commentaries and Op-Eds. Amin previously ran the paper's defunct Star magazine supplement. Mizanur Rahman, the Head of Operations, and Tajdin Hasan, the Chief Business Officer, are the two other key leaders of the newspaper.

== Controversies ==
In recent years, the paper has complained of growing restrictions on press freedom in Bangladesh. It also faced pressure from the government which affected its ad revenues.

=== Lawsuits from Awami League and BNP members ===
PEN America strongly criticized the lawsuits filed against Mahfuz Anam, including as many as 83 lawsuits and 30 counts of criminal defamation lodged by members and supporters of the Awami League. During the Bangladesh Nationalist Party government in the 2000s, Anam faced defamation lawsuits from ruling BNP leaders. He was co-accused with Matiur Rahman, editor of the Bengali newspaper Prothom Alo, in defamation cases filed by Salahuddin Quader Chowdhury. Anam was represented in court by Kamal Hossain.

=== DGFI leaks ===
In 2016, speaking at a panel discussion on ATN News, Mahfuz Anam admitted that The Daily Star ran stories fed to the newspaper by military intelligence outfit DGFI during the military-backed state of emergency and caretaker government in 2007 and 2008. The stories accused Awami League and BNP leaders of corruption. A string of lawsuits were filed against Anam following his admission.

=== Website blocked ===
The newspaper's website was briefly blocked on 1 June 2018 after it reported the extrajudicial killing of Ekramul Haque by members of the Rapid Action Battalion. The killing took place while the victim was speaking with his family on the phone. The Bangladesh Telecommunication Regulatory Commission (BTRC) did not give any explanation for the block.

=== Child abuse by staff ===
In February 2024, Executive Editor Syed Ashfaqul Haque and his wife Tania Khondoker were sent to jail after they surrendered to a court in Dhaka, following the death of a fifteen year old female maid at their house in Mohammadpur Thana. Haque and his wife faced charges of child abuse. The deceased maid was a teenage girl named Preeti Urang who worked as a servant in the house of the executive editor. Urang hailed from a tea garden worker's family in Moulvibazar District. Protests were held demanding justice for the girl's death. The newspaper issued a formal apology over the incident.

=== Simin-Shahzreh case fraud news propagation ===
In December 2024, Simin Rahman of Transcom Group was accused by his younger sister of embezzling her deceased father's shares through non-judicial stamp fraud. On 18 May 2025, investigative reporter Elias Hossain published a report on YouTube, stating that Simin Rahman was unethically assisted by Prothom Alo editor Matiur Rahman and Daily Star's Mahfuz Anam in this matter along with doing false news reports. Zulkarnain Saer Khan also criticised Matiur Rahman Mahfuz Anam for involving in this matter, as well as Prothom Alo and the Daily Star for propagating false news in support of it.

== Star Weekend magazine ==
Cover of 1 February 2008

Starting in May 1996, The Daily Star published a weekly magazine supplement titled The Star every Friday. Aasha Mehreen Amin was the first editor of the magazine and continued in that capacity for 18 years. The Star became Star Weekend. Elita Karim was the magazine's editor from 2015 to 2017. Star Weekend ceased publication on 29 November 2019, as The Daily Star downsized to adapt to a changing media landscape.

== E-Reading ==
Starting from early 2026, Daily Star notified users that after a decade of offering free e-paper news, it would be moving towards a paid subscription model. However the website remains free of cost.

== See also ==
- List of newspapers in Bangladesh
