= Faraaz (film) =

2022 film by Hansal Mehta

- Theatrical release poster
- Directed by: Hansal Mehta
- Written by: Ritesh Shah; Kashyap Kapoor; Raghav Kakkar
- Based on: Holey Artisan: A Journalistic Investigation by Nuruzzaman Labu
- Produced by: Bhushan Kumar; Krishan Kumar; Anubhav Sinha; Sahil Saigal; Sakshi Bhatt; Mazahir Mandsaurwala
- Starring: Zahan Kapoor; Juhi Babbar; Aamir Ali; Aditya Rawal; Jatin Sarin; Harshal Pawar; Pallak Lalwani; Reshham Sahaani
- Cinematography: Pratham Mehta
- Edited by: Amitesh Mukherjee
- Music by: Sameer Rahat; Vidhya Gopal; Alok Ranjan Srivastava; Khalid Ahamed
- Production companies: T-Series; Benaras Media Works; Mahana Films
- Distributed by: AA Films (India); Reliance Entertainment (Overseas)
- Release dates: 15 October 2022 (BFI London Film Festival); 3 February 2023 (India)
- Running time: 112 minutes
- Country: India
- Languages: Hindi; English

Faraaz is a 2022 Indian Hindi-language action thriller film directed by Hansal Mehta and produced by T-Series and Benaras Media Works in association with Mahana Films. The film supports an ensemble cast with Zahan Kapoor starring as the titular Faraaz Ayaaz Hossain with Juhi Babbar, Aamir Ali, Aditya Rawal, Pallak Lalwani, and six newcomers, Jatin Sarin, Reshham Sahaani, Ninaad Bhatt, Harshal Pawar, and Sachin Lalwani including Kapoor marking their debuts.

Based on Nuruzzaman Labu's 2017 book Holey Artisan: A Journalistic Investigation, it depicts the July 2016 Dhaka attack at the Holey Artisan Bakery in Bangladesh. The film premiered at the BFI London Film Festival on 15 October 2022, and was released in India on 3 February 2023.

At the 69th Filmfare Awards, the film received five nominations, including Best Film (Critics) and Best Supporting Actor (Rawal), and won Best Male Debut (Rawal).

== Plot ==
The film commences with playful banter among the five terrorists Nibras, Mubashir, Rohan, Bikash, and Rajiv in Dhaka, ultimately leading them to Holey Artisan Bakery. Faraaz's family discord unfolds, but he later joins his friends at the bakery, where they get taken hostage. An unexpected attack on police officers near the bakery intensifies the situation.

Inside, tensions rise as hostages are held captive. The police attempt a standoff but face challenges without a blueprint. The government advises mission cancellation for hostage safety, triggering global news coverage. Faraaz's mother, Simeen, confronts RAB DG Benazir, adding to the external pressure.

Midnight arrives, tensions escalate, and a clash between Nibras and Faraaz occurs. Despite a brief truce, Rohan's attempt to leave results in his death. Nibras announces freedom for hostages, except for Faraaz's friends. A heated exchange leads to Faraaz's declaration before his tragic end.

Outside, reinforcements from BAF, DB, Ansar, CID, and Counterterrorism and Transnational Crime Unit join for a final assault, ending the terrorists' reign. Before that, Nibras kills Faraaz and his friends.

Later in the aftermath of the attack, Faraaz's mother, Simeen, presents him winning the Mother Teresa Memorial International Award.

== Cast ==
- Zahan Kapoor as Faraaz Hossain
- Juhi Babbar as Simeen, Faraaz’s mother
- Aditya Rawal as Nibras
- Jatin Sarin as Mubashir
- Sachin Lalwani as Rohan
- Ninaad Shaunak Bhatt as Khairul
- Harshal Pawar as Bikash
- Godaan Kumar as Rajiv
- Pallak Lalwani as Tarika
- Aamir Ali as Mr. Sen, Tarika's father
- Reshham Sahaani as Ayesha
- Abhirami Bose as Tahana
- Ashish Bhatt as Tamid Hasib Khan
- Ninaad Shaunak Bhatt as Khairul
- Kaushik Chakraborty as RAB Officer Benazir
- Hadelin de Ponteves as Chef Diego
- Shivani Dubey as Fairuz
- Mann Gandhi as Rayan
- Pia Gandhi as Safa
- Aparna Ghoshal as Tullika
- Nitin Goel as Senior Inspector Farooq
- Premji Jhangiani as Dr. Mujahid
- Sneha Joshi as Ishrat
- Amit Kaushik as Dr. Salprakash
- Miles Lobo as Takomi
- Aditya Mahajan as Deputy Commissioner Mushtaq
- Pooja Mihija as Rabia
- Aneeta as Nibras' Sister
- Ruma Mondal as Fefta
- Manusudhan Naik as Nanabhal
- Rohan Roy as Manirul Islam (SWAT Officer)
- Nida Sheikh as Sharmina
- Amir Shoeb as Zaraif
- Amit Singh as Hassnat
- Ankur Srivastava as Chef Sarkar

== Production ==
The rights of Bangladeshi crime reporter Nuruzzaman Labu's 2017 book Holey Artisan: A Journalistic Investigation, about the July 2016 Dhaka attack, were acquired by Mahesh and Mukesh Bhatt's Vishesh Films in 2020. Hansal Mehta was chosen as the film's director and Vishesh included T-Series and Anubhav Sinha as the producers.

On 5 August 2021, the director Hansal Mehta revealed Faraaz. A joint production, with Anubhav Sinha and Bhushan Kumar depicting the Holey Artisan Bakery attack in July 2016 in Dhaka, Bangladesh. Newcomers Aditya Rawal, Zahan Kapoor, Jatin Sarin, Sachin Lalwani, Ninad Bhatt, Harshal Pawar, Palak Lalwani, and Reshham Sahaani were cast in the film.

The filming, which took place in Mumbai, began in June 2021 and ended on 15 August 2021. The Holey Artisan Bakery in Gulshan, Dhaka was recreated in Mumbai. Plans to shoot the film on location in Bangladesh were dropped due to the coronavirus pandemic.

In 2025, it was alleged that Matiur Rahman, Anisul Hoque and Mahfuz Anam helped Simeen Rahman, Faraaz's mother, and Transcom Group launder at least 730 million taka from Bangladesh to India to make the film.

== Release ==
The film premiered at the BFI London Film Festival on 15 October 2022 in 'Thrill' section. It was released in India on 3 February 2023, after Delhi High Court refused to grant stay for release in a suit filed by the mothers of two girls who died in the terrorist attack.

The film has been criticized for allegedly "exploiting a horrifying tragedy for profit without asking the permission of victims family." The film's director Mehta defends against those remarks by referring to a The Business Standard opinion article that emphasizes "artistic freedom" and "being a target of cancel culture." Ruba Ahmed, the mother of Abinta Kabir, who was killed in the attack, filed a writ on 12 February 2023, seeking a ban on the film for misrepresenting her daughter and Bangladesh. After hearing that writ petition, the High Court bench of Md. Khasruzzaman and Md Iqbal Kabir ordered the film to be banned from theatrical and streaming services for being misleading. Though the case is still ongoing in that country. A similar plea by families of the victims, at the Delhi High Court, to ban the film in India did not succeed though the court ordered the addition of a disclaimer at the film's beginning.

The film is critical of the handling of the terror attack by the Bangladeshi government and Mehta later said that he was harassed by Bangladeshi and Indian government officials, the latter wary of straining relations with the Sheikh Hasina government. He also claimed to have declined a pre-screening request by Muhammad Imran, the High Commissioner of Bangladesh to India at the time of its release.

== Song ==
""Musafir Ko""

Song by Sameer Rahat, Vidhya Gopal
- Released: January 27, 2023
- Length: 4:35
- Label: T-Series
- Songwriter: Sameer Rahat
- Producers: Siddharth Pandit, Sameer Rahat

Official video
- Faraaz - Song on YouTube

""Khairiyat Se""

Song by Sameer Rahat, Alok Ranjan Srivastava, Khalid Ahamed
- Released: January 27, 2023
- Length: 3:53
- Label: T-Series
- Songwriters: Sameer Rahat, Alok Ranjan Srivastava
- Producer: Sameer Rahat

Official video
- Faraaz - Song on YouTube

The film has two songs, "Musafir Ko" written and composed by Sameer Rahat; and "Khairiyat Se" composed and produced by Sameer Rahat and written by Alok Ranjan Srivastava and Sameer Rahat.

== Reception ==
Faraaz received mediocre reviews from critics and audiences. On the review aggregator website Rotten Tomatoes, 67% of 12 critics' reviews are positive, with an average rating of 5.5/10.

Monika Rawal Kukreja reviewing for Hindustan Times praised the performance of ensemble writing, "some fine performances such as: Juhi Babbar Soni as Faraaz's mother is terrific, Aditya Rawal, his brutal portrayal as the brainwashed youth that leaves you in awe, Zahan Kapoor delivers a restrained performance and emotes beautifully". Kukreja praised the lyrics of the song "Musafir ko ghar he aana hai" saying, "[the] highlight of Faraaz remains the soulful, moving lyrics." Concluding, Kukreja wrote, "Faraaz doesn't set out to send you home with a moral lesson yet puts across its point very subtly."

Dishya Sharma of News18 rated the film 3.5 stars out of 5 and wrote, "Faraaz is a trademark Hansal Mehta film and is not for the weak-hearted. The film is bound to leave you disturbed and empty by the end of it." Renuka Vyavahare writing for The Times of India rated 3.5 out of 5 and wrote, "Hansal Mehta’s acclaimed body of work is testament to his sensibility". Praising the performances of the ensemble she wrote, "every new actor gives a sincere performance", she appreciated Aditya Rawal who, she said, "portrays every aspect of his character perfectly," and Zahan Kapoor for, "his balanced and effective titular role." For others, Vyavahare said, "Newcomers Sachin Lalwani and Reshham Sahaani along with Juhi Babbar play their parts with conviction." Concluding, Vyavahare opined, "As a confined space hostage thriller, Faraaz is adequately gripping and impactful. It, however, isn’t as claustrophobic and gut-wrenching as a Neerja or Hotel Mumbai."

Anuj Kumar writing in The Hindu praised the performances of: Juhi Babbar writing, "Juhi brings out the guts and grace of the character with a deft performance", Zahan Kapoor saying, "Zahan gets the tonality of Faraaz right" and Aditya Rawal stating, "Aditya is a revelation as Nibras." Concluding, Kumar mentioned the present scenario of "religious chauvinism" and wrote, "Faraaz is an ache that will gradually grow on the discerning."

Shubhra Gupta of The Indian Express gave the movie 2 out of 5 starts rating and states "At a time where rampant bigotry and muscular nationalism is on the rise, films which give us humans of all shades are more than welcome."

Nuruzzaman Labu, on whose book the film is based, stated that plans to release Faraaz Hossain by the terrorists, as depicted in the film, and Faraaz's reluctance for want of saving his friends were false. He said that his book does not mention this and none of the witnesses or hostages at the Holey Artisan Bakery attest this. He opined the change in the film was to find a heroic protagonist for the plot, and did not particularly object the depiction.

=== Accolades ===
Award	Ceremony date	Category	Recipients	Result	Ref.
Filmfare Awards	28 January 2024	Best Film (Critics)	Hansal Mehta	Nominated	
Filmfare Awards	28 January 2024	Best Supporting Actor	Aditya Rawal	Nominated	
Filmfare Awards	28 January 2024	Best Cinematography	Pratham Mehta	Nominated	
Filmfare Awards	28 January 2024	Best Sound Design	Mandar Kulkarni	Nominated	
Filmfare Awards	28 January 2024	Best Male Debut	Aditya Rawal	Won	

== See also ==
- Shonibar Bikel, 2019 film also based on the terrorist attack
- Jamaat-ul-Mujahideen Bangladesh and Islamic State – Bengal Province, the perpetrators of the attack
- Tamim Chowdhury and Mohammad Saifullah Ozaki, the ISIL leaders responsible for the attack
