= Tamim Chowdhury =

Bangladeshi-Canadian terrorist (1986–2016)

Tamim Ahmed Chowdhury
- তামিম আহমেদ চৌধুরী
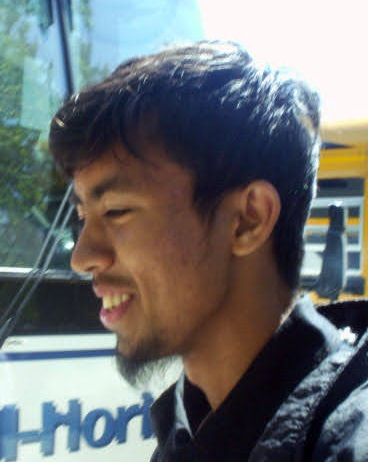
- Chowdhury in 2006

Head of military operations of Islamic State – Bengal Province
- In office 2016 – 27 August 2016
- Preceded by: Office established
- Succeeded by: Office demolished

Personal details
- Born: Tamim Ahmed Chowdhury তামিম আহমেদ চৌধুরী 25 July 1986 Sylhet, Bangladesh
- Died: 27 August 2016 (aged 30) Narayanganj Sadar Upazila, Narayanganj, Dhaka, Bangladesh
- Occupation: Head of military operations of Islamic State – Bengal Province
- Nickname: Abu Dujanah al-Bengali

Military service
- Allegiance: Islamic State (2012 – 2016)
- Rank: Head of military and covert operations
- Battles/wars: Terrorism in Bangladesh †

Tamim Ahmed Chowdhury (Bengali: তামিম আহমেদ চৌধুরী; 25 July 1986 – 27 August 2016), known by his kunya Abu Dujanah al-Bengali (Bengali: আবু দুজানাহ আল-বাঙালি), was a Bangladeshi-Canadian Islamist militant that was the head of military and covert operations of the Islamic State's Bengal Province. For a while, he was alleged to be the emir of the Islamic State's Bengal Province, Shaykh Abu Ibrahim al-Hanif. He was the alleged mastermind of the July 2016 Dhaka attack at the Holey Artisan Bakery, which resulted in 29 deaths. He was killed in a raid on an IS safehouse in Dhaka by Bangladeshi forces on 27 August 2016.

== Early life and education ==
He was born on 25 July 1986 in Sylhet, Bangladesh. Chowdhury was formerly a resident of Windsor, Ontario, Canada. He attended J.L. Forster Secondary School in Windsor. He competed for the school in a variety of track and field activities in 2004. He graduated from the University of Windsor in Spring 2011, with an honours degree in chemistry.

Amarnath Amarasingam, Post-Doctoral Fellow with the Resilience Research Centre at Dalhousie University, said of Chowdhury's time in Windsor, "There were a few [people] who knew him from the mosque and from the social circles" and "He was a shy, skinny kid." A spokesperson for the Windsor Islamic Association (WIA) commented, "We can confirm that Tamim Chowdhury was from Windsor, though he was not a well-known individual in the community."

== Islamic State ==
He may have travelled to Syria at some point in 2012–13. He returned to Bangladesh sometime afterwards. He was described as the "prime architect" and "one of the masterminds" of the July 2016 Dhaka attack. On 2 August 2016, it was reported that the Bangladeshi police had offered a reward of 200,000 Bangladeshi taka ($2,500) for information leading to his capture.

Three militants, including Chowdhury, were killed during a joint forces raid at a house in Narayanganj Sadar Upazila on 27 August 2016. Monirul Islam, chief of Dhaka Metropolitan Police counter-terrorism unit, confirmed his death in an announcement reported in the Bangladeshi newspaper.
