= Md. Asaduzzaman (police officer) =

Md. Asaduzzaman is the retired deputy inspector general and former chief of Dhaka Metropolitan Police's Counter Terrorism and Transnational Crime unit.

== Career ==
On 8 November 2017, Asaduzzaman was promoted to additional deputy inspector general while serving as the superintendent of police of Bogra District.

Asaduzzaman had served in the Special Branch of Bangladesh Police. He is a former additional commissioner of the Dhaka Metropolitan Police.

Asaduzzaman was appointed chief of the Counter Terrorism and Transnational Crime of Dhaka Metropolitan Police in April 2021. He replaced Monirul Islam. He led the investigation into the jail break of two members of Ansar al-Islam, who had been sentenced to death for the murder of Faisal Abedin Deepan, from the Dhaka Chief Judicial Magistrate Court using pepper spray in November 2022.

In October 2023, Asaduzzaman prevented Bangladesh Jamaat-e-Islami from holding a rally at Motijheel after Bangladesh Police denied them permission. He denied allegations that Haris Farooqi, head of Indian branch of the Islamic State, was in Bangladesh. He detained the chief of Jama'atul Ansar Fil Hindal Sharqiya. He worked on security for the 12th parliamentary elections in Dhaka.

== Controversy ==
After 5 August 2024 political change, interim government of Bangladesh accused him of plotting millitant drama against innocent people including 2016's 7 murder in Gazipur, arrest of 2 female student of Manarat International University, murder of Major Zahidul etc. As a result, on 21 August 2024, the interim government of Bangladesh sent him on forced retirement due to public cause.
