= Islamic State in Jammu and Kashmir =

Kashmiri faction of the Islamic State

- ولاية كشمير
- Flag of the Islamic State in Jammu and Kashmir
- Founder: Dawood Ahmed Sofi †
- Leader: Dawood Ahmed Sofi † (2017–18); Ishfaq Ahmad Sofi † (2018–19)
- Dates active: 2017 – 2019
- Allegiance: Islamic State
- Active regions: Jammu and Kashmir
- Ideology: Islamism; Takfiri'ism; Salafism; Islamic extremism Salafist Jihadism; Anti-Barelvi'ism; Anti-Deobandi'ism; Anti-Hindu sentiment Anti-Indian sentiment
- Size: Unknown

The Islamic State in Jammu and Kashmir (ISJK, ISIS–JK, Islamic State – J&K) was a group loyal to the Islamic State, operating in the Kashmir Valley of India's Jammu and Kashmir. It was not an official faction of the Islamic State.

== History ==
The Islamic State announced in 2016 that ISKP will expand into Kashmir. In 2017, protestors all around Kashmir, especially in Srinagar, waved the Islamic State flag alongside the Pakistani flag at various rallies. In Nowhatta, outside of the Jamia Masjid, a group of people set the Indian flag on fire while flying the Pakistani and Islamic State flags. Flying the Pakistani flag, or any national flag, is against the Islamic State's doctrine and is unlike anything that they would do. Later, the Jammu and Kashmir Police confirmed that the Islamic State had no involvement in the rallies and that it was only locals. The ISJK's existence has mostly been observed online. In December 2017, a pro-Islamic State video in Urdu was shared on Telegram, using the hashtag "Wilayat Kashmir" (Kashmir Province) in which a masked man pledges allegiance to the Islamic State and invited AQI-affiliated groups to join the Islamic State. The ISJK has not been listed an official Islamic State wilayah (province).

The ISJK is not recognised by the Islamic State, and ISPP and ISHP are the ones responsible for Islamic State activities in Pakistani and Indian controlled Kashmir, respectively. The Islamic State – Khorasan Province had anncouned the creation of ISHP for IS on 11 May 2019 on Amaq News Agency after clashes in Jammu and Kashmir in which ISJK leader Ishfaq Ahmad Sofi was killed.

The ISJK is against LeT, JeM, and HM, who have openly rejected both Al-Qaeda and Islamic State propaganda. The United Jihad Council chairman and HM leader, Syed Salahuddin, stated that Kashmiri jihad movement is indigenous, and does not have a worldwide caliphate goal, and claimed that both al-Qaeda-affiliated groups and the ISJK are attempts by the Indian government to ruin the image of the Kashmiri jihad movement. Syed Ali Shah Geelani accused ISJK, and the Islamic State as a whole, of being un-Islamic and a creation of the West with the intention of dividing Muslims. The ISJK aims to spread the Islamic State caliphate to Jammu and Kashmir, rather than to split from India or to merge with Pakistan.

== Activities ==
=== Indian Region ===
- The Islamic State claimed responsibility for an attack in Srinagar on 17 November 2017, which killed an Indian policeman.

=== Pakistan Region ===
- The ISJK also threatened Pakistani ISI and its affiliated groups in Kashmir.

== See also ==
- Territory of the Islamic State#India
- Foreign fighters in the Syrian Civil War and War in Iraq#India
- The Kerala Story, a 2022 Indian film about the ISIS in India
- Islamic State – Bengal Province, IS in Bangladesh
