= Rupnagar Residential Area =

Area of Dhaka, Bangladesh

Coordinates: 23.8128°N 90.3564°E

Rupnagar Residential Area is a central residential area of Mirpur in Dhaka.

== History ==
Rupnagar Residential Area was established in 1984 by the National Housing Authority on 10,181 acres with 1,200 residential plots. From 1997 to 1998, Awami League member of parliament Kamal Ahmed Majumder supported people that were trying to illegally grab land in the residential area. According to the Rupnagar Residential Welfare Association, Majumder helped his supporters get commercial plots in the area at below market price. Rupnagar Model School and College serves residents of the area.

In 2003, The Daily Star reported Muktijoddha Rehabilitation Cooperative Society, Rupnagar Government Housing Estate Cooperative Society, and Sonar Bangla Bohumukhi Samabay Samity were filling the lake at the Rupnagar Residential Area with permission of the authorities. Rupnagar Residential Welfare Association complained to Prime Minister Khaleda Zia complaining about violation of the original plan of the area. The Prime Minister's Office forwarded the complaint to the Ministry of Housing and Public Works who ordered the chairman of the National Housing Authority, Mohammed Abdul Khaleq, to investigate.

In December 2004, Rapid Action Battalion detained Purbo Banglar Communist Party leader Mofakkhar Hossain, also known as Mahamud Hasan from Rupnagar Residential Area and then killed him via crossfire in Kushtia.

In August 2008, The Daily Star reported that Rupnagar main canal was being filled up near Rupnagar Residential Area. The main canal carries sewage and stormwater from Rupnagar Residential Area, Alokdi village, Duaripara, Kazipara, Mirpur Section 2, Monipur, and West Shewrapara to Turag River. National Housing Authority had filed cases against land grabbers in 2007 who were filling the canal to illegally develop plots. This contributed to waterlogging in Mirpur-10. Residents protested calling for protection of Rupnagar-Duaripara canal.

Counter-Terrorism and Transnational Crime, led by Monirul Islam, killed a militant and aid of Tamim Ahmed Chowdhury in a raid on 3 September 2016. A police officer killed himself and his wife in July 2017. Rapid Action Battalion-1 detained six muggers from Rupnagar Residential Area and Savar in a special operation in April 2018.

Atiqul Islam, mayor of Dhaka North City Corporation, oversaw cleanup of the Rupnagar canal in January 2021. He announced his plans to expand the canal so that people could reach the Turag River by boat from Rupnagar Residential Area. According to the National Housing Authority in 2021, 44 plots in Rupnagar Residential Area were under illegal occupation for 36 years since the plots were allocated.
