= Proloy Kumar Joarder =

Bangladeshi police officer and superintendent of police

Proloy Kumar Joarder is a Bangladeshi police officer and superintendent of police of Jessore District. He is considered an "influential officer" in the Bangladesh Police headquarters.

Joarder is a former general secretary of Bangladesh Police Service Association. He is a former deputy commissioner of the Counter Terrorism Unit of the Dhaka Metropolitan Police. He served as the protocol officer of Prime Minister Sheikh Hasina. He is the son-in-law of Swapan Bhattacharjee, former Awami League member of parliament and the minister of state for rural development and cooperatives.

== Early life ==
Joarder was born in Barhatta Upazilla of Netrokona District.

== Career ==
Joarder joined Bangladesh Civil Service in the 24th batch as a police cadre.

Joarder was the protocol office of Prime Minister Sheikh Hasina. In April 2010, Joarder took new year greetings from Prime Minister Sheikh Hasina to the leader of the opposition Khaleda Zia.

In April 2016, Joarder was promoted to superintendent of police. In October 2016, Joarder was appointed deputy commissioner of the Dhaka Metropolitan Police.

Joarder as SWAT Deputy Commissioner led a raid, called Operation Eagle Hunt, on a militant base in Chapainawabganj in April 2017 killing four and detaining two militants. He was elected general secretary of Bangladesh Police Service Association while Asaduzzaman Mia, commissioner of Dhaka Metropolitan Police, was elected the president of the association.

In February 2019, Joarder was re-elected general secretary of Bangladesh Police Service Association while Benazir Ahmed, director general of Rapid Action Battalion, was elected the president. He was awarded for his service during Police Week-2019. Joarder was the deputy commissioner of the Counter Terrorism and Transnational Crime of the Dhaka Metropolitan Police. Joarder caught COVID-19 in November 2020 while serving as the superintendent of police of Narsingdi District.

Joarder was appointed superintendent of police of Jessore District on 22 January 2021 replacing Md Ashraf Hossain, who had been removed from his post for detaining and torturing an Awami League politician.

Jaorder received the award for the best superintendent of police in Khulna Range in June 2023.

In November 2023, Joarder was promoted to additional deputy inspector general. In December 2023, Jatiya Party candidates for election asked the Election Commission to withdraw Joarder but withdrew the request after Joarder assured them that he will support fair elections. Awami League leaders of Manirampur Upazila also asked for his removal as his in-laws are from Jessore and member of parliament Swapan Bhattacharjee is his father-in-law.

=== Controversy ===
On 15 February 2024, local public representatives in Jessore District at a press conference called for the removal of Joarder and Additional Superintendent of Police Belal Hussain from Jessore. They wanted to hold the press conference at Jessore Press Club but the police prevent them and they held it at the Jessore Municipal Hall. The representatives included mayor of Jessore, Sheikh Moksimul Bari Opu, upazila and union politicians, and Awami League politicians. They accused the two police officers of harassing politicians and public representatives.

In response to the press conference, the police raided the homes of public representatives and politicians throughout Jessore District two days later and threatened them. Additional Superintendent of Police Belal Hussain led the police teams from Kotwali police station and the Detective Branch and warned public representatives against holding programs against the police.

Prothom Alo reported Joarder got posting superseding senior officers to important positions, including protocol officer to Prime Minister Sheikh Hasina. The newspaper reported it was not uncommon for police officers with close connections to the ruling party.

== Personal life ==
Joarder was married to Biplabi Rani, additional director of the National Security Intelligence and president of the Jessore District unit of Bangladesh Police Nari Kallyan Samiti. She died on 6 November 2023 at Bangabandhu Sheikh Mujib Medical University from cancer. His father-in-law, Swapan Bhattacharjee, is a member of parliament and the minister of state for rural development and cooperatives.
