= Bangladesh Police Service Association =

Professional body

Bangladesh Police Service Association বাংলাদেশ পুলিশ সার্ভিস এসোসিয়েশন
- Abbreviation: BPSA

Bangladesh Police Service Association (BPSA) is the association of the BCS cadre police officers of Bangladesh.Ex. Gazipur Metropolitan Police Commissioner Nazmul Karim Khan is the President and Dhaka District Superintendent of Police. Anisuzzaman is the general secretary of the organisation.

== History ==
In January 2008, Nabo Bikram Kishore Tripura, additional inspector-general of police, and Mahbubur Rahman, superintendent of police of Dhaka District, became the president and general secretary of the Bangladesh Police Service Association respectively.

In January 2011, A. K. M. Shahidul Haque, additional inspector-general of police, and Monirul Islam, assistant commissioner of Detective Branch, became the president and general secretary of the Bangladesh Police Service Association respectively.

In July 2017, Bangladesh Police Service Association defended police officers actions over detaining Upazila Nirbahi Officer of Barisal Tariq Salmon over publishing a distorted image of President Sheikh Mujibur Rahman. The actions of the police were criticized by Bangladesh Administrative Service Association and officers in question were withdrawn from service.

In 2018, Asaduzzaman Mia, police commissioner of Dhaka Metropolitan Police, and Muhammad Harun Or Rashid, superintendent of police, were the president and general secretary of the Bangladesh Police Service Association respectively. The Bangladesh Police Service Association and the Bangladesh Administrative Service Association had a reunion in July 2018 and agreed to work together. On 27 December 2018, Bangladesh Police Service Association criticized Kamal Hossain over his comments against police officers.

In February 2019, Benazir Ahmed, director general of the Rapid Action Battalion, and Proloy Kumar Joarder, deputy commissioner of the Counter Terrorism and Transnational Crime Unit became the president and general secretary of the Bangladesh Police Service Association respectively.

In January 2020, Shafiqul Islam, police commissioner of Dhaka Metropolitan Police, and Mohammad Jayedul Alam, superintendent of police in Narayanganj District, became the president and general secretary of the Bangladesh Police Service Association respectively. Bangladesh Police Service Association defended the police force in the wake of the murder of retired major Sinha Mohammed Rashed Khan by some police officers.

In February 2021, Bangladesh Police Service Association criticized the report by Al Jazeera on corruption in Bangladesh titled All the Prime Minister's Men.

On 26 June 2021 Monirul Islam, additional inspector-general of police of the Special Branch and Md Asaduzzaman, deputy commissioner (Gulshan) of Dhaka Metropolitan Police became the president and general secretary of the Bangladesh Police Service Association respectively.

In December 2021, the Bangladesh Police Service Association criticized the United States sanctions against Bangladesh security personnel, including former president of the association Benazir Ahmed.

The Bangladesh Police Service Association sent a threatening letter to editors after newspaper published reports on wealth and possible corruption of two retired police officers, Benazir Ahmed, and Asaduzzaman Mia, both former office holders of the association. The letter and statement was protested by the Bangladesh Federal Union of Journalists, Crime Reporters' Association of Bangladesh, Dhaka Union of Journalists, Editors' Council, Editors Guild, Newspaper Owners Association of Bangladesh, and Transparency International Bangladesh.

== See also ==
- Bangladesh Judicial Service Association
- Bangladesh Administrative Service Association
