= Bangladesh University of Business and Technology =

Private university of Bangladesh

Bangladesh University of Business & Technology
- বাংলাদেশ ব্যবসা ও প্রযুক্তি বিশ্ববিদ্যালয়
- Other name: BUBT
- Motto: একাডেমিক শ্রেষ্ঠত্ব প্রতিশ্রুতিবদ্ধ
- Motto in English: Committed to Academic Excellence
- Type: Private research
- Established: 2003; 23 years ago
- Accreditation: Institution of Engineers, Bangladesh; Institution of Textile Engineers and Technologists; Association of Commonwealth Universities
- Affiliations: University Grants Commission (UGC)
- Chancellor: President Mohammed Shahabuddin
- Vice-Chancellor: A B M Shawkat Ali
- Dean: Syed Anwarul (FoAHSS); Syed Masud Husain (FoB); Ali Ahmed (FoEAS)
- Academic staff: 350
- Students: 9,000
- Undergraduates: 8,000
- Postgraduates: 1,000
- Location: Plot # 77-78 Road # 9 Rupnagar Residential Area, Mirpur, Dhaka, 1216, Bangladesh; 23.8065°N 90.3522°E
- Campus: Urban
- Language: English
- Website: www.bubt.edu.bd

University rankings

Regional – Overall
- QS Asia: 1401-1500 (2026)

Bangladesh University of Business and Technology (Bengali: বাংলাদেশ ইউনিভার্সিটি অব বিজনেস অ্যান্ড টেকনোলজি) or BUBT is a private university in Bangladesh, located in Mirpur, Dhaka, Bangladesh.

BUBT was founded in 2003 under the Private University Act 1992 and was approved by the University Grants Commission (UGC) and the Ministry of Education, Government of Bangladesh. It was modeled after North American universities. It started its operation at the Dhaka Commerce College campus, the founder organization of BUBT, but shifted its activities in 2019. Now, it is running all its programs at its own campus at Rupnagar R/A, Mirpur 2.

== Campus ==
Bangladesh University of Business and Technology (BUBT) is situated at Rupnagar, Mirpur-2, Dhaka, adjacent to Dhaka Commerce College, the National Zoo, Sher e Bangla National Cricket Stadium with four buildings and with facilities for higher education. It is surrounded by several educational institutions. BUBT has its own sports complex, spanning an area of 7 acres. It is located in Beribadh, Mirpur, Dhaka.

== Scholarships and waivers ==
There are provisions for scholarships, stipends, and tuition fee waivers for the students in BUBT.

1. Scholarships, stipends and fee waivers are awarded to a minimum of 6% of students of the university on the basis of need and merit.
2. 100% fee waiver is awarded to the sons and daughters of Freedom Fighters.
3. For Undergraduate Programs, special tuition fee waivers ranging from 25% to 100% is given for the first year (three semesters) based on the total GPA of the SSC and the HSC examination results.
4. For subsequent semesters, tuition fee waiver is also given on the basis of the examination results of each semester at BUBT.
5. Students of Dhaka Commerce College and Principal Kazi Faruky School & College are allowed an additional 20% tuition fee waiver.
6. Tuition fee waiver is available for sibling.

== List of vice-chancellors ==
- Muhammed Fayyaz Khan (1 July 2020 - 30 June 2024)

== Academics departments ==
=== Undergraduate programs ===
==== Faculty of Business ====
- BBA (Major in Accounting, Finance, Marketing and HRM)

==== Faculty of Engineering & Applied Sciences ====
- B.Sc. in Civil Engineering (Four-year Program)
- B.Sc. in Civil Engineering for Diploma Engineers
- B.Sc. in Engineering in EEE for Diploma Engineers
- B.Sc. Engineering in CSE (Four-year Program)
- B.Sc. in Textile Engineering (Four-year Program)
- B.Sc. in Textile Engineering for Diploma Engineers
- B.Sc. Engineering in CSE for Diploma Engineers
- B.Sc. Engineering in EEE (Four-year Program)

==== Faculty of Arts & Humanities ====
- BA (Hons.) in English

==== Faculty of Social Sciences ====
- B.S.S. (Hons.) in Economics

==== Faculty of Law ====
- LL. B (Hons) (Four-year Program)

=== Graduate programs ===
==== Faculty of Business ====
- EMBA (Major in Accounting, Finance, Marketing & HRM)
- MBM (Two year evening program)
- MBA (Major in Accounting, Finance, Marketing, Management & HRM)

==== Faculty of Arts & Humanities ====
- M. A. in English (Two-year evening program)
- M. A. in English Language Teaching (ELT)

==== Faculty of Social Sciences ====
- M.Sc. in economics (One-year evening program)

==== Faculty of Mathematical & Physical Science ====
- M.Sc. in mathematics (General: Two-year evening program)
- M.Sc. in mathematics (General: One-year evening program)
- M.Sc. in mathematics (Thesis: Two-year evening program)

==== Faculty of Law ====
- LL. M (One-year evening program)

== Academic calendar ==
BUBT follows a model of higher education consisting of semesters, courses, credit hours, continuous evaluation and letter grading. The academic year begins from October and runs through September of the following year. An academic year is divided into the following three semesters:

- Fall : July -December
- Spring : January - June
- Summer : June - September

The semester duration is usually of fifteen weeks-thirteen weeks for classes and two weeks for final examination and result.

== Notable alumni ==
Sayem Mahammed Albhee, Engineer at Meta Platforms.
