= Izumi (restaurant) =

Coordinates: 23.7886°N 90.4205°E

- Interactive map of Izumi

Restaurant information
- Food type: Japanese Cuisine
- Location: House 24/C on Road 113, Gulshan-2, Dhaka, Dhaka, Bangladesh

Izumi is a Japanese restaurant located in Dhaka, Bangladesh, and operates as a sister concern of Holey Artisan Bakery.

== History ==
Masayuki Nakajimaya is the executive chief of Izumi. The restaurant flies in tuna from Tsukiji Market in Tokyo, Japan. In 2015, it was placed as the third best Japanese restaurant in Dhaka by The Daily Star foodies choice award.

== See also ==
- List of Japanese restaurants
