= 2026 Islamabad mosque bombing =

Suicide bombing in Pakistan

- Part of Persecution of Shias by the Islamic State
- CCTV footage of the attack
- Location: 33°38′36″N 73°9′13″E; Khadija Tul Kubra Mosque, Islamabad, Pakistan
- Date: 6 February 2026; 1:38 p.m. (PKT, UTC+05:00)
- Attack type: Suicide bombing; shooting
- Weapons: Explosives and pistol
- Deaths: 32 (including the perpetrator)
- Injuries: 170+
- Perpetrator: Islamic State – Pakistan Province
- Assailant: Yasir Khan Shinwari
- Motive: Anti-Shi'ism

On 6 February 2026, a suicide attack occurred at the Khadija Tul Kubra Mosque, a Shia mosque in the Tarlai Kalan area of southeastern Islamabad, Pakistan. The explosion occurred during Friday prayer, killing 31 people and injuring over 169 others.

The Islamic State militant group claimed responsibility. The Pakistani government blamed Afghanistan and India; both governments denied involvement. Four suspects were arrested the day after the attack.

== Background ==
Pakistan has experienced ongoing sectarian violence between Sunni and Shia Muslims. Militant organizations, including the internationally designated terrorist groups Tehrik-i-Taliban Pakistan (TTP) and Islamic State – Khorasan Province (ISKP), have claimed responsibility for similar attacks in the past, often during religious gatherings.

The bombing occurred against a backdrop of heightened militant activity in Pakistan, including recent attacks in Balochistan and other provinces. Islamabad, the capital, is typically considered secure due to extensive military and police presence, making such incidents uncommon.

== Attack ==
The explosion took place shortly after Friday prayer began at the Khadija Tul Kubra Mosque in Tarlai Kalan, a suburb on the outskirts of Islamabad. CCTV footage of the explosion depicts it occurring at 1:38 p.m. local time. Police reported that the suicide bomber was stopped at the mosque's entrance by security guards before opening fire and detonating explosives inside or near the mosque, causing significant damage to the structure and scattering debris across the area.

Witnesses reported chaos as worshippers fled the scene, with bloodied victims visible in the mosque's garden and surrounding areas. Television footage showed rescue workers and security personnel cordoning off the site and transporting the injured to hospitals. Police confirmed the blast was a deliberate attack and initiated an investigation, including forensic analysis of the site.

== Casualties ==
32 people were killed and more than 170 others were injured during the attack. Many of the victims were worshippers attending the weekly congregational Friday prayer. Hospitals in Islamabad, including the Pakistan Institute of Medical Sciences, received the injured, some in critical condition. The bombing was the deadliest in Islamabad since the Marriott Hotel attack in 2008, which killed 63 people.

== Aftermath ==
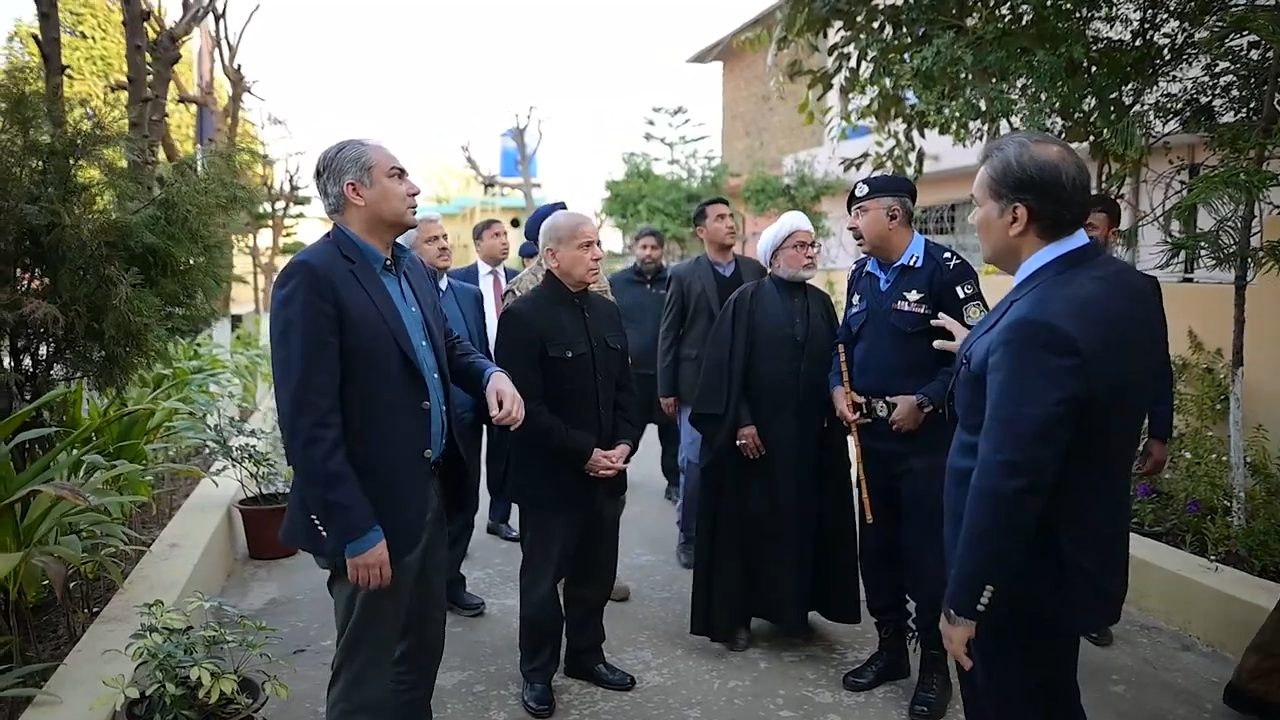
Prime Minister Shehbaz Sharif visiting the mosque after the bombing

Pakistani leaders, including prime minister Shehbaz Sharif, condemned the attack and vowed to hold those responsible accountable. Defence minister Khawaja Asif blamed India and Afghanistan for the attack. The governments of both countries rejected claims of involvement.

The Islamic State – Pakistan Province, a regional affiliate of the Islamic State, claimed responsibility for the attack on Telegram, releasing a photo purported to show the assailant holding a gun. The group announced that it viewed Shia Pakistanis as legitimate targets. Police sources indicated preliminary links to the Tehrik-i-Taliban Pakistan (TTP), even though TTP had not recently attacked any Shia place of worship. Other analyses suggested possible involvement by the Islamic State – Khorasan Province (ISKP), given the attack's hallmarks. Security forces increased patrols in Islamabad following the incident, with investigations ongoing as of 6 February 2026.

The Interior Minister of Pakistan, Mohsin Naqvi, announced on 7 February 2026 that four suspects had been arrested including one "Afghan Daesh [ISIL/ISIS] mastermind." Naqvi accused Indian authorities of funding the attack and supplying the attackers with target information. The Pakistani military stated that the “planning, training, and indoctrination for the attack took place in Afghanistan”.

Pakistan conducted airstrikes into Afghanistan on 22 February as retaliation for the bombings.

== Analysis ==
Fahad Nabeel, head of consultancy group Geopolitical Insights, believed the attack would perpetuate Pakistan's negative relations with Afghanistan. He also urged the government to pursue more action against urban militant networks. Local security analyst Manzar Zaidi noted the rarity of sectarian attacks in recent years, urging the government to monitor the situation in Kurram to prevent the renewal of sectarian clashes. He also rejected equating the bombing to the district court attack in Islamabad the previous year, noting the difference in sectarian and state targets respectively. Quincy Institute regional analyst Adam Weinstein doubted that the bombing would hinder the Pakistani government's interest in promoting foreign investment opportunities, "but it might change whether a U.S. delegation is going to travel to Islamabad to hear their pitch."

== See also ==
- 2022 Peshawar mosque attack
- 2023 Peshawar mosque bombing
- 2024 Balochistan bombings
- Sectarian violence in Pakistan
- List of terrorist incidents in 2026
- 2024 Muscat mosque shooting
