= Islamic State – Hind Province =

Indian branch

- Dates active: 2019–present
- Split from: Islamic State - Khorasan Province
- Active regions: India (including Jammu and Kashmir)
- Ideology: ideology of the Islamic State
- Size: Unknown
- Part of: Islamic State

The Islamic State – Hind Province (Note: Arabic: الدولة الاسلامية – ولاية الهند, romanized: al-Dawlah al-Islāmīyah – Wilāyat al-Hind, Hindi: इस्लामिक स्टेट – हिंद प्रांत, romanized: islāmik sṭeṭ – hind prānt) (ISHP) is the Indian branch of the Islamic State and is responsible for Islamic State activities in Jammu and Kashmir of India. Islamic State activities in India and South Asia were initially under Islamic State – Khorasan Province, the Islamic State later began operating in Jammu and Kashmir and rest of India through its Islamic State Jammu & Kashmir (ISJK/ISISJK) branch, which had begun in February 2016 but was an unrecognised faction. The Islamic State – Khorasan Province anncouned the creation of Wilayah [Wilayat] al-Hind (India Province) for IS on 11 May 2019 on Amaq News Agency after clashes in Jammu and Kashmir in which ISJK leader Ishfaq Ahmad Sofi was killed.

Shafi Armar, a former member of the Indian Mujahideen, was formerly the chief of operations for the IS in India. He and his brother Sultan Armar founded the Indian ISIS affiliates Ansar-ut Tawhid fi Bilad al-Hind (transl. Supporters of Monotheism in the Land of India) and Janood-ul-Khalifa-e-Hind (transl. Caliph's Army of India). Both he and his brother were killed in action during Syrian Civil War in 2015, which was only confirmed in 2019 because his online account was controlled by other militants in the group which added to the confusion. Janood-ul-Khalifa-e-Hind published the pro-IS propaganda magazine Sawt al-Hind (transl. Voice of India) from February 2020 until May 2022.

== Incidents ==
On 20 March 2024, the special forces arrested the ISIS India chief, Haris Farooqi and one of his associates while they were trying to cross to India from neighbouring Bangladesh. Police explained that the suspects had planned many sabotage activities and IED attacks inside India.

On 9 August 2024, Rizwan Ali, an ISIS operative was arrested by the NIA while planning an attack in New Delhi.

A terror plot was foiled after police arrested Ashhar Danish, a young man who was covertly manufacturing bombs for ISIS in a dilapidated lodge in Ranchi’s Islamnagar area. The lodge, known as Tabarak Lodge, posed as a hotel but was in fact a hub for terror activities, including bomb-making and recruitment.

== See also ==
- Territory of the Islamic State (India)
- Foreign fighters in the Syrian Civil War and War in Iraq (India)
- Islamic State – Bengal Province, IS in Bangladesh
- Islamic State – Pakistan Province, IS in Pakistan
