= Islamic State – Pakistan Province =

Pakistani branch of the Islamic State

- الدولة الإسلامية – ولاية باكستان
- Leaders: Islamic State Caliphs: Abu Bakr al-Baghdadi (2014–2019) † (Leader of IS) Abu Ibrahim al-Hashimi al-Qurashi (2019–2022) † (Leader of IS) Abu al-Hasan al-Hashimi al-Qurashi (February 2022–October 2022) † (Leader of IS) Abu al-Hussein al-Husseini al-Qurashi (2022–2023) † (Leader of IS) Abu Hafs al-Hashimi al-Qurashi (2023–present) (Leader of IS)
- Dates active: May 2019–present
- Split from: Khorasan Province
- Headquarters: Southern Afghanistan
- Active regions: Pakistan (Punjab Province, Balochistan Province, Azad Kashmir, Sindh Province), Iran (Sistan and Balochistan province)
- Ideology: Islamic Statism: Salafism Sunni Islamism Pan-Islamism Islamic extremism Islamic Fundamentalism Qutbism Salafi Jihadism Anti-Barelvi Anti-Deobandi Anti-Sikh sentiment Anti-Hindu sentiment Anti-Zionism Antisemitism Anti-Christian sentiment Anti-Shi'ism
- Size: Unknown
- Part of: Islamic State

The Islamic State – Pakistan Province (Note: Arabic: الدولة الإسلامية – ولاية باكستان, romanized: ad-Dawlah al-Islāmīyah – Wilāyat Bākistan, Urdu: اسلامی ریاست - پاکستان صوبہ, romanized: islami ryast - pakistan subah, Punjabi: اسلامک سٹیٹ – پاکستان صوبہ, romanized: Isalāmika saṭēṭa - pākisatāna sūbā, Pashto: اسلامي دولت – پاکستان ولایت, romanized: islami dawlat - pakistan wilayat Balochi: ریاست اسلامی – استان پاکستان, romanized: ryásti islámi - estáni pákistán Sindhi: اسلامي رياست - پاڪستان صوبو, romanized: islami riyast - pakastan sobo) (ISPP) is the Pakistani branch of the Islamic State. It was formed as a split of the Islamic State – Khorasan Province (ISKP).

== History ==
In May 2019, the Islamic State announced the creation of Pakistan Province on Amaq News Agency. Prior to the creation of ISPP, the ISKP was in charge of Islamic State activities in all of Pakistan. ISKP is active in Khyber Pakhtunkhwa (KPK), while ISPP is active in Pakistani provinces Punjab, Balochistan and Azad Kashmir, as well as Sistan and Baluchestan province of Iran. It is a separate group from the unofficial ISJK faction. Shortly after its creation, ISPP killed a Pakistani policeman in Mastung and a TTP militant in Quetta. ISPP also killed Shia Hazara refugees. Immediately after the creation of ISPP, the Government of Punjab called for measures against ISPP.

ISPP has claimed responsibility for the 2024 Sibi bombing and the 2024 Balochistan bombings.

On 15 April 2025, a bus carrying personnel from the Pakistani security forces was targeted with an improvised explosive device, resulting in the deaths of three soldiers and injuries to twenty others. The Islamic State – Pakistan Province claimed responsibility for the attack.

On 6 February 2026, a suicide bomber of the ISPP blew up in a Shia Imambarghah during Friday prayers, killing 31 people and injuring 170+ others.

== See also ==
- Islamic State – Bengal Province, IS in Bangladesh
- Islamic State – Hind Province, IS in India
- Islamic State – Khorasan Province, IS in Afghanistan, Iran and Khyber Pakhtunkhwa
