= July 2016 Dhaka attack =

Terrorist attack in Dhaka, Bangladesh

- Part of Terrorism in Bangladesh
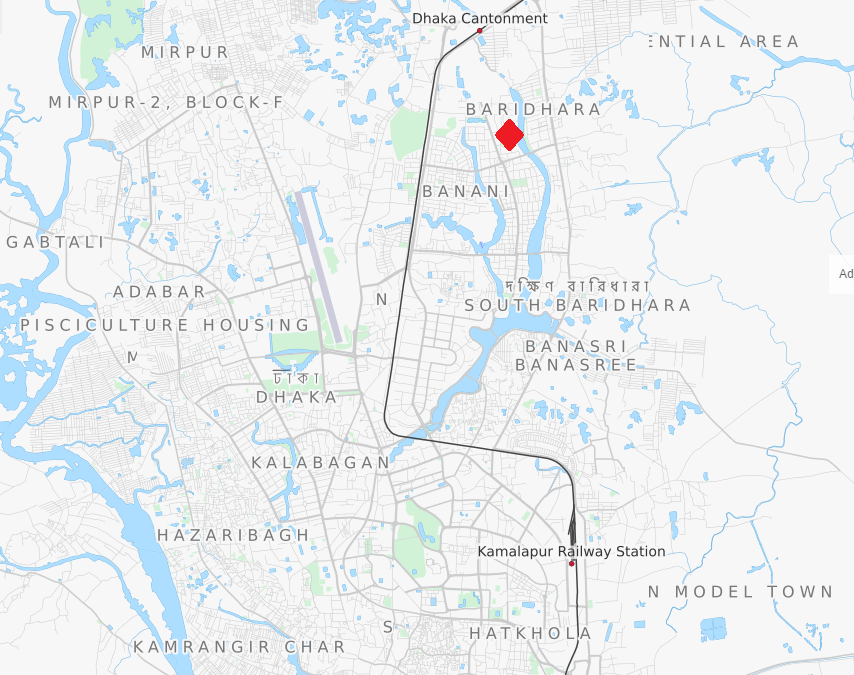
- Location of the attack within Dhaka
Date	1–2 July 2016
Location	Holey Artisan Bakery; Road No 79, House 5, Gulshan 2 Dhaka 1212, Bangladesh 23.8025°N 90.4167°E

Belligerents
Bangladesh	Islamic State

Commanders and leaders
Sheikh Hasina; ABM Shafiul Haque; Mujibur Rahman; MM Imrul Hasan; Nizamuddin Ahmed; Asaduzzaman Mia	Mohammad Saifullah Ozaki; Tamim Chowdhury X; Nurul Islam Marzan X; Rohan Imtiaz †

Units involved
Bangladesh Armed Forces: Bangladesh Army; 46th Independent Infantry Brigade; 1st Para-Commando Battalion; Bangladesh Navy; Special Warfare Diving and Salvage; Directorate General of Forces Intelligence; Counter Terrorism and Intelligence Bureau; Bangladesh Police; Counter Terrorism and Transnational Crime; SWAT; Rapid Action Battalion; Special Branch; Border Guard Bangladesh	Islamic State – Bengal Province; Jamaat-ul-Mujahideen Bangladesh; Neo-JMB

Casualties and losses
2 killed, 30+ wounded	5 killed
- 22 civilians killed

The July 2016 Dhaka attack or Holey Artisan terrorist attack took place on the night of 1 July 2016, at 21:20 Bangladesh Standard Time (UTC+06:00), when five Islamic State (IS) terrorists took hostages and opened fire on the Holey Artisan Bakery in Gulshan Thana jurisdiction in Dhaka, Bangladesh. The terrorists entered the bakery with crude bombs, machetes, and pistols, and took several dozen hostages, including foreign nationals. In the immediate response while Dhaka Metropolitan Police tried to regain control of the bakery, two police officers were shot dead by the assailants.

By the end of the security forces' operation, 29 people were killed, including 20 hostages (17 foreigners and three Bangladeshis), two police officers, five terrorists, and two bakery staff. After the police failed to breach the bakery and secure the hostages, they set up a perimeter along with the Rapid Action Battalion and Border Guard Bangladesh. Very early on 2 July (around 03:00), it was decided that the Bangladesh Armed Forces would launch a counter-assault named Operation Thunderbolt. The assault was led by the 1st Para-commando Battalion, an elite force in the Bangladesh Army under the leadership of operational commander Brigadier General Mujibur Rahman, and began at 07:40. According to Bangladesh's Inspector General of Police, all of the attackers were Bangladeshi citizens. IS claimed responsibility for the incident and released photographs of the gunmen, but then- Home Minister Asaduzzaman Khan stated that the perpetrators belonged to Jamaat-ul-Mujahideen and were not affiliated with IS.

The incident was described by BBC News as the "deadliest Islamist attack in Bangladeshi history." The local media referred to it as the 7/16 attack.

== Background ==
The Constitution of Bangladesh declares secularism as one of the four fundamental principles of the country but also recognises Islam as the state religion. Around 91% of Bangladeshis are Muslims, with the rest being Hindus, Buddhists, Christians and others.

The terrorist Islamic organisation Jamaat-ul-Mujahideen was founded in 1998 and outlawed in 2005 when it committed a series of bombings, but later took up activities again. Bangladesh government later tried and hanged Shaykh Abdur Rahman and Siddiqur Rahman, two leaders of the organisation.

Some attacks came from another Islamic terrorist group outlawed in 2005 named Harkat-ul-Jihad al-Islami, including the 2004 Dhaka grenade attack and 2001 Ramna Batamul bombings. Mufti Hannan, the leader of the terrorist group was sentenced to death on 23 December 2008.

Since 2013, Muslim-majority Bangladesh has experienced an increase in Islamist attacks on religious minorities, secularist and atheist writers and bloggers, LGBT rights activists and liberal-minded Muslims. Since September 2015, there have been over 30 such attacks, and Islamic State of Iraq and the Levant have claimed responsibility for 21 of them. Ansarullah Bangla Team, another terrorist group outlawed on 25 May 2015, also claimed responsibility for some of them.

In November 2015, the IS magazine Dabiq published an article calling for the "revival of jihad in Bengal".

Gulshan is a well off, upscale residential neighbourhood of Dhaka and is home to many foreign embassies.

== Attack and hostage ==
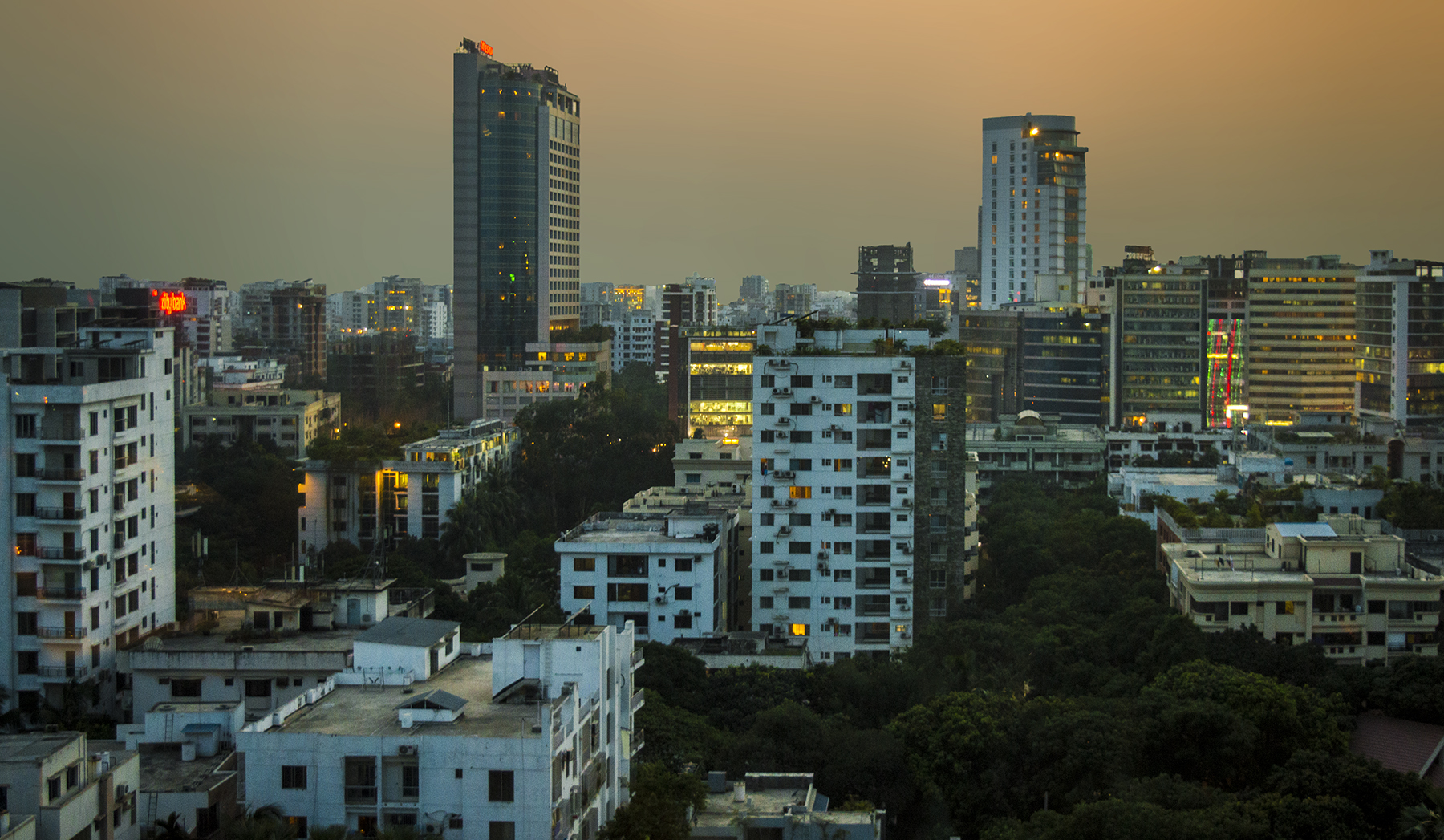
Gulshan 2. Bangladeshi joint forces restricted the movement in area at the time of Operation Thunderbolt during the hostage crisis at the area's Holey Artisan Bakery. Police had earlier beefed up security around the Dhaka Westin based on intelligence reports of a forthcoming attack.

The attack started at about 21:40 local time. Five attackers entered the restaurant armed with bombs, pistols, and assault rifles. One attacker also had a sword. They opened fire indiscriminately and detonated several of the bombs. Several patrons dove under their tables, while panicked staff members ran onto the stairs. An Argentinian-Italian chef named Diego Rossini bolted upstairs, while several restaurant employees followed him. They then jumped onto the rooftops of nearby buildings.

Staff on the second floor ran and hid inside a restroom. A total of 8 staff members were hiding inside the restroom. The restroom was warm and cramped, as it was storing yeast and flour. The attackers then went upstairs and walked in front of the door, shouting "Bengali people, come out... If you're Muslims, come out." Because there was no answer, the gunmen thought that there was no one inside the restroom, and locked the restroom's door. The staff members inside the restroom began to text their relatives, stating that they were inside the restroom and pleaded for help. The attackers then took many hostages, almost all foreigners. Reports indicate that the attackers were "unfailingly polite and solicitous" with the restaurant staff and other Bangladeshis. They took the staff into their confidence, complaining that foreigners, with their skimpy clothes and taste for alcohol, were impeding the spread of Islam. "Their lifestyle is encouraging local people to do the same thing," a militant said.

Alerted by the gunfire, police detective Rabiul Karim and officer-in-charge Salauddin Khan started to investigate. Other police officers responded, arriving at the restaurant. The attackers then engaged in a shootout with the police. Police cordoned off the area around the restaurant and planned a rescue raid. The attackers however threw grenades and fired, killing officers Karim and Khan.

DMP Commissioner, Asaduzzaman Mia, and several officers struck inside and opened fire on the terrorists in an attempt to rescue civilians from the site. 9 people were brought back from the site in the attempt. Prime Minister Sheikh Hasina was briefed by the Commissioner and she instructed him to move away with his men and informed him the Army Chief Belal Shafiul Huq was on his way from Sylhet.

The attackers then spotted one member of staff, named Miraj, who hid in the corner. One of the gunman told Miraj: "Everyone else ran away but you couldn't make it, that means God wants you to die." The gunman then strapped him to a chair with explosives, creating their human shield. The gunmen then separated the Muslims from the non-Muslims. The Muslims were given food and water, while the non-Muslims, were not. On the early morning of 2 July, the attackers began releasing hostages. A group of women wearing hijabs were released by the attackers; they offered a young Bangladeshi man, Faraaz Hossain, the opportunity to leave as well. However, Hossain refused their offer and refused to leave his friends, who were prohibited from leaving by the gunmen.

Pictures allegedly taken from inside the restaurant were circulated on Twitter by pro-IS accounts and show several bodies and pools of blood on the floor. The daily Kaler Kantho reported that the terrorist group Ansar al-Islam announced the upcoming attack via a tweet almost 10 hours before the actual attack took place.

In 2026, the restaurant's founder, Nasirul Alam Porag, gave an interview detailing his experience through the event for the first time. Porag was in Bangkok, Thailand after three weeks of opening its first outlet there when the attack took place. He followed the event live via security cameras in the restaurant and was fed live in-detail updates from the scene. According to him, his biggest concerns then were only his staffs and guests.

== Rescue operation ==
The rescue operation was ordered by the Bangladeshi Prime Minister Sheikh Hasina and was named Operation Thunderbolt. The planning of the Operation was finalized at a meeting between the Bangladeshi Prime Minister Sheikh Hasina and Armed forces chiefs and top officials of different law enforcement agencies. The operation was led by 1st Para-Commando Battalion under the leadership of Operational Commander Brigadier General Mujibur Rahman of the Bangladesh Army's 46 Independent Infantry Brigade . Members of the Bangladesh Army, Navy, Air Force, Border Guard Bangladesh, Police, Rapid Action Battalion, and SWAT started the rescue operation at 07:40 local time. Commandos stormed into the bakery with nine APCs acting in support, smashing through the wall. A man, living next to the restaurant, took a video of the operation and tweeted it on internet. Within 12 to 13 minutes, they took control over the area. The rescue operation lasted around 50 minutes. Bangladesh Army chief General Abu Belal Muhammad Shafiul Huq and Bangladesh Navy chief Admiral Mohammad Nizamuddin Ahmed were present in the area during the raid.

Thirteen hostages were rescued. Five of the attackers were killed exchanging fire with the commandos, while the sixth was captured alive. During the operation one of the bakery's chefs was mistakenly identified as an attacker by the commandos and shot dead.

Two of the hostages, Tahmid Hasib Khan and Hasnat Karim, were taken by police for questioning, and subsequently vanished amidst confusion about whether they had been released or not.

== Casualties ==
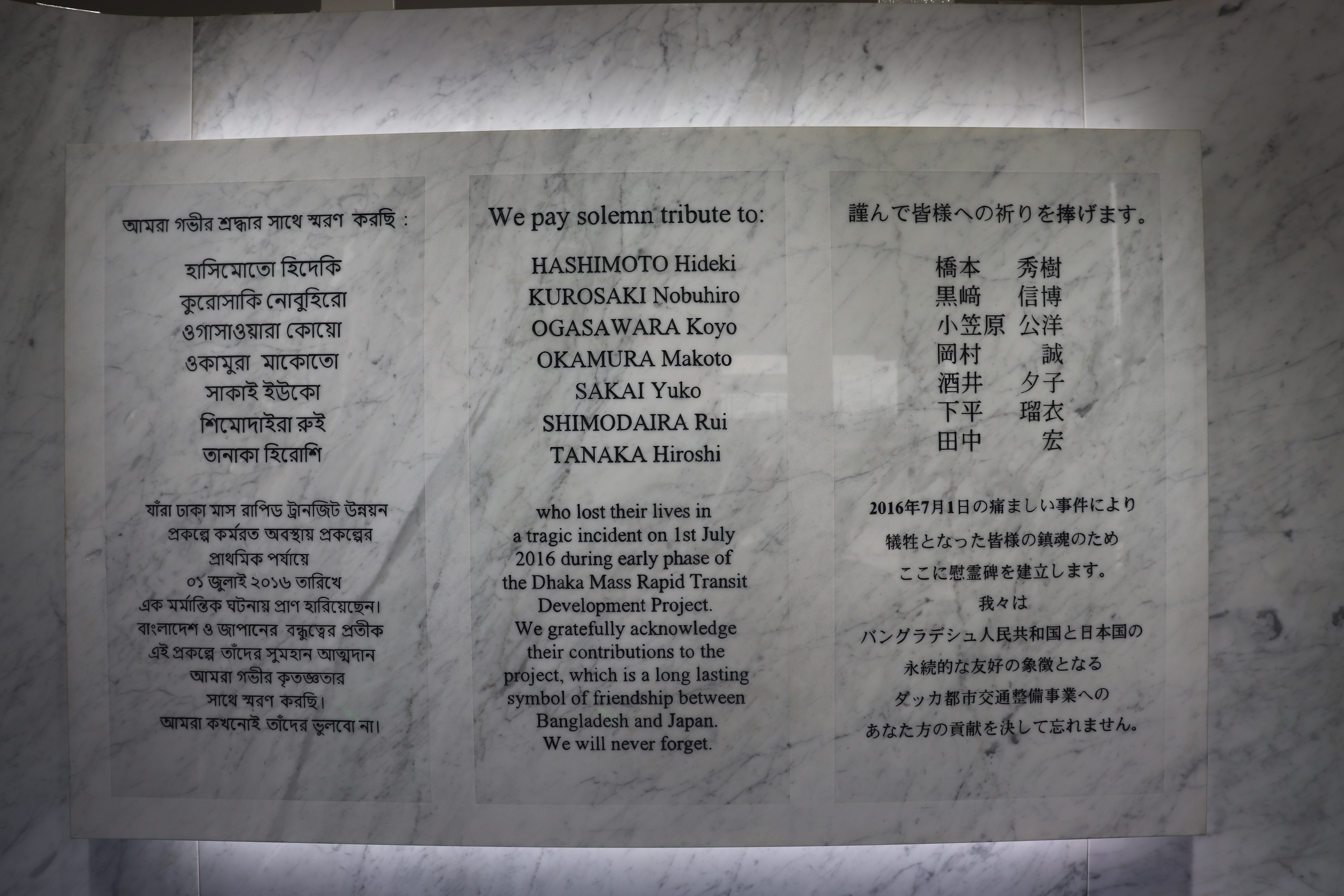
A memorial plaque at the Metro Rail Exhibition and Information Centre, Diabari, honours the seven Japanese MRT Line 6 officials who were killed in the attack.

Twenty-two civilians, five terrorists, and two police officers were confirmed killed, while 50 others, mostly police personnel, were injured. The two dead police officers included Rabiul Islam, Assistant Commissioner of Detective Branch of the Dhaka Metropolitan Police, and Salahuddin Ahmed, officer-in-charge of the nearby Banani police station. Nine Italian citizens were among the victims. The Bangladesh Army initially announced that all 20 hostages killed in the attack were foreigners, and that they were "killed brutally with sharp weapons" by the perpetrators. Those who could recite a verse from the Quran from memory were spared in an effort to only kill non-Muslims. Later a chef of the bakery was identified among the dead bodies. An injured staff of the bakery died at Dhaka Medical College Hospital on 8 July 2016.

Among the dead were seven Japanese citizens – five men and two women – who were associated with the Japan International Cooperation Agency (JICA). One of the women was pregnant at the time. Tarishi Jain, a 19-year-old female student of the University of California, Berkeley, of Indian nationality, was also killed. She was the only Indian killed in the attack.

Deaths by nationality
Country	Number
Bangladesh	7
India	1
Italy	9
Japan	7
Total	24

The dead included:

- Faraaz Ayaaz Hossain (Bangladeshi)
- Ishrat Akhond (Bangladeshi)
- Rabiul Karim (Bangladeshi)
- Salauddin Khan (Bangladeshi)
- Saiful Islam Chowkidar (Bangladeshi)
- Zakir Hossain Shaon (Bangladeshi)
- Abinta Kabir (Bangladeshi)
- Cristian Rossi (Italian)
- Marco Tondat (Italian)
- Nadia Benedetti (Italian)
- Adele Puglisi (Italian)
- Simona Monti (Italian)
- Claudia Maria D'Antona (Italian)
- Vincenzo D'Allestro (Italian)
- Maria Rivoli (Italian)
- Claudio Cappelli (Italian)
- Hideki Hashimoto (Japanese)
- Nobuhiro Kurosaki (Japanese)
- Koyo Ogasawara (Japanese)
- Makoto Okamura (Japanese)
- Yuko Sakai (Japanese)
- Rui Shimodaira (下平瑠衣 Shimodaira Rui; Japanese)
- Hiroshi Tanaka (田中宏 Japanese)
- Tarishi Jain (Indian)

The five terrorists who died during rescue operation by military and joint forces were:

- Nibras Islam
- Rohan Imtiaz
- Meer Saameh Mubasheer
- Khairul Islam
- Shafiqul Islam

Among the injured were 25 police personnel there were several higher-ranking officers of the Dhaka Metropolitan Police including an Additional Commissioner, two Additional Deputy Commissioners, the Officer-in-charge of the Gulshan police station and an Inspector.

The Italian Deputy Foreign Minister Mario Giro had attended a meeting in Bangladesh and visited the attack site. He then took the bodies of 9 Italian victims and carried them to their homeland in Italy. The plane carrying the bodies landed on 5 July at Ciampino Military Airbase south of Rome, Italy. Autopsy shows that all nine Italians were tortured in the attack. Several of them were slashed with knives and several of them were mutilated. Authorities confirmed that the nine Italian victims suffered "slow and agonizing death".

Relatives of the seven Japanese victims in the attack were flown to Bangladesh to view and identify the bodies, accompanied by Senior Vice Foreign Minister Seiji Kihara, Foreign Ministry and the Japan International Cooperation Agency. A ceremony for the repatriation of the bodies were held at a stadium in Dhaka, which was attended by the Japan's Ambassador to Bangladesh, Masato Watanabe. The bodies of the seven Japanese victims were flown to Tokyo on 5 July. The plane took off from Shahjalal International Airport at 8:40 pm local Bangladesh time.

Survivors recalled that the attackers had no mercy to the foreigners. One of the survivors stated that an Indian woman, identified as Tarishi Jain, who had been badly injured, was moaning in agony but a perpetrator took a sword to her and killed her without mercy.

== Responsibility ==
An initial report from Amaq News Agency, which is affiliated with the Islamic State, said the group claimed it had killed 24 people and wounded 40 others. A second report, issued directly by ISIL a few hours later, said the group had killed "22 crusaders" and was accompanied by photos of the attackers, standing in front of IS banners.

According to The New York Times, citing Bangladesh police, the attackers were named Akash, Badhon, Bikash, Don, and Ripon. IS referred to the five men by their kunya which were Abu Omar al-Bengali, Abu Salmah al-Bengali, Abu Rahim al-Bengali, Abu Muslim al-Bengali and Abu Muharib al-Bengali. According to The New York Times, pictures of the bodies of the five men, released by Bangladeshi police, matched five photographs of the men released by ISIL.

Nevertheless, the home minister of Bangladesh, Asaduzzaman Khan, stated that the perpetrators belonged to Jamaat-ul-Mujahideen and were not affiliated with IS. They were well-educated and mostly from rich families. Bangladeshi politicians also blamed opposition groups, like those within the Bangladesh Nationalist Party, of plotting to destabilize the country by supporting Islamic extremists like the Jamaat-ul-Mujahideen. The opposition denied such claims. Bangladeshi Prime Minister Sheikh Hasina's political adviser Hossain Toufique Imam claimed that Bangladesh authorities who monitored social media saw several messages on Twitter on Friday (1 July 2016) saying there would be an attack; however, police believed that the attack would target embassies or major hotels and restaurants instead.

The attackers, all in their late teens or early 20s, were identified as wealthy men from Bangladesh's elite, having attended top private schools and universities in Bangladesh and abroad. It was revealed that three of the attackers came from a privileged background, educated with western curricula. Police named the five gunmen who attacked the restaurant as Nibras Islam, Rohan Imtiaz, Meer Saameh Mubasheer, Khairul Islam and Shafiqul Islam. One of them Nibras Islam was known as a "fun-loving, in and out of love, and keen on sport". He attended Monash University in Malaysia and returned because "he didn't like it in Monash". Nibras' father was a businessman with two houses in Dhaka, and one of his uncles was a Deputy Secretary to the Bangladesh Government. It was revealed that Nibras was following a Twitter account belonged to an Islamic State propagandist named Mehdi Masroor Biswas, who was arrested in Bangalore in 2015.

Two gunmen were identified as Meer Sameh Mubashir and Rohan Imtiaz. Both went to Scholastica School which follows Cambridge International Examinations curriculum. Local newspapers reported that both of them had gone missing long before the attack. Rohan Imtiaz has been identified as the son of a politician in Bangladesh's ruling party Awami League. Police then identified another gunman, named as Shafiqul Islam Ujjal from Koiyagarhi village, Bogra District. He enrolled at Government Azizul Haque College in Bogura for graduation after passing higher secondary examinations. He had left the college later and took up a teaching job at a kindergarten school in Shajahan Market area in Dhaka.

On 6 July 2016, a video was released by IS from Syria through SITE intelligence website, where three Bengali speakers warned the Bangladeshi Government saying "What you witnessed in Bangladesh...was a glimpse. This will repeat, repeat and repeat until you lose and we win and the sharia is established throughout the world. The jihad that is waged today is a jihad under the shade of the Caliphate."

== Suspects, arrests and convictions ==
On 16 July 2016, Police arrested three people for renting out a flat to the attackers in Bashundhara Residential Area. One of them was Gias Uddin Ahsan, a professor of North South University. The other two were his nephew Alam Chowdhury and the manager of the building Mahbubur Rahman Tuhin. Police found sand-filled cartons, which police suspect to be used to carry grenades thrown during the attack and used clothes in the flat. Police also suspect that the attackers and their associates stayed in the flat during Ramadan, and the attack plan was drafted there.

On 26 July 2016, police raided an apartment in Kallyanpur chasing 10 suspects, all of whom are believed to be part of the same group that carried out the Holey Artisan Bakery attack, and who were planning another large-scale attack; they killed nine and arrested one. It is reported that the police were directing vigilantes organised as a "citizen's committee" by the local MP for Dhaka-14, Aslamul Haque. Participants included members of the Awami League, Jubo League, and Chhatra League.

On 27 August 2016, Tamim Chowdhury, the supposed mastermind of the attack, was killed in a raid on an IS safehouse in Dhaka by Bangladeshi forces. On 2 September, his deputy Murad was killed in another raid in Dhaka's Rupnagar area.

On 6 January 2017, Bangladeshi police shot dead two Islamist terrorists including Nurul Islam Marjan, a commander of a splinter group of the Jamaat-ul-Mujahideen Bangladesh (JMB) which is the prime suspect and was on a police wanted list for his role in the attack since July 2016.

On the night of 13 January 2017, Bangladeshi counterterrorism forces arrested Jahangir Alam, man suspected of being a key planner of the attack in Tangail District.

In December 2018, the trial of eight people accused of being Jamaat-ul-Mujahideen Bangladesh who were suspected of helping plan and supply weapons for the attack opened before a special tribunal in Dhaka. In November 2019 seven were convicted and sentenced to death while one was acquitted. After a four-year period, their death sentences were commuted down to life sentences until natural death. "Considering the brutality of the murder, the overall cruel behavior of the terrorists on the spot at the time of the incident and the tarnishing of the image of Bangladesh in the outside world, we think that justice will be ensured if each of them (seven convicts) is sentenced to life imprisonment (till natural death) in the case," the bench said in the full text of the verdict uploaded on the SC website on June 17 of 2025. On the 2nd of July 2025, DMP commissioner Sheikh Md. Sajjad Ali said "Mentionable, Holy Artisan incident was a terrorist attack and after appropriate investigations the people involved were by now exposed to justice.” He also highlighted police’s challenges in the country’s current situation and some irregularities during the subsequent governments.

=== Zakir Naik and Peace TV ===
After revealing the investigations of the attack in July 2016 published by The Daily Star that a terrorist involved in the brutal killings followed Zakir Naik's page on Facebook and was influenced by Naik's speeches. The terrorist had posted sermons of Zakir Naik on social media where Naik urged "all Muslims to be terrorists" Indian Union Minister of State for Home Affairs Kiren Rijiju said, "Zakir Naik's speech is a matter of concern for us. Our agencies are working on this." He was then termed a controversial as well as a popular figure by the media. After 2 days in investigation, the Maharashtra State Intelligence Department (SID) gave a clean chit to Zakir Naik and said that Naik would not and cannot be arrested on his return to India as the probe ordered by the Maharashtra government did not find any other strong evidence to link Naik to terror-related activities. The Daily Star apologized to Naik over the Dhaka Terror Attack controversy and stated that they never blamed him for the attack. The newspaper quoted that it only reported how youth were misinterpreting his speeches. However, soon thereafter the Bangladesh Government banned the broadcast of Naik's Peace TV channel. Hasanul Haq Inu, the Information Minister, reasoned that "Peace TV is not consistent with Bangladeshi society, Bangladesh's constitution, our culture, customs and rituals".

== Reactions ==
- (Bangladesh) Bangladeshi Prime Minister Sheikh Hasina condemned the killings and hostage crisis and stated that Islamic terrorists were maligning the name of Islam and assured that the government will do everything to restrain militancy and extremism in the country. President Mohammad Abdul Hamid also condemned the terrorist attack and expressed deep shock at the death of the hostages and police officials. Two days of national mourning was observed in the memory of the deceased victims.
- (India) Indian Prime Minister Narendra Modi condemned the attack and said, "the attack in Dhaka has pained us beyond words." He also telephoned his Bangladeshi counterpart. President Pranab Mukherjee wrote on Twitter that he was "deeply saddened at the loss of life and injuries caused to innocent civilians."
- Italian Prime Minister Matteo Renzi offered condolences to the families of the victims, saying, "our values are stronger than hatred and terror." He also said that the nation had suffered "a painful loss." The Italy national football team wore black armbands during their Euro quarter final match against Germany. Both teams held a moment of silence in memory of the victims before the game.
- Japanese Prime Minister Shinzo Abe telephoned his Bangladeshi counterpart and commanded the Embassy of Japan in Bangladesh to rescue the Japanese alive from the crisis, labeling the incident as "unfortunate". Some other Japanese government officials and agencies including Foreign Minister Fumio Kishida, Deputy Chief Cabinet Secretary Koichi Hagiuda, Chief Cabinet Secretary Yoshihide Suga, Japan International Cooperation Agency expressed their concern over the incident and condemned the killings.

=== Organisations ===
- (European Union) EU Chief of Foreign Policy Federica Mogherini issued a statement expressing 'solidarity' with Bangladesh. The statement said that the EU stands with the people of Bangladesh and offered their deepest condolences to the dead and to the wounded.
- The Organisation of Islamic Cooperation, as shocked to hear the attack and condemned the attack in its strongest terms, and offered their condolences to the victims of the attack.
- The United Nations Security Council strongly condemned the terrorist attack and said, "the members of the Security Council reaffirmed that terrorism in all its forms and manifestations constitutes one of the most serious threats to international peace and security".

== Legacy ==
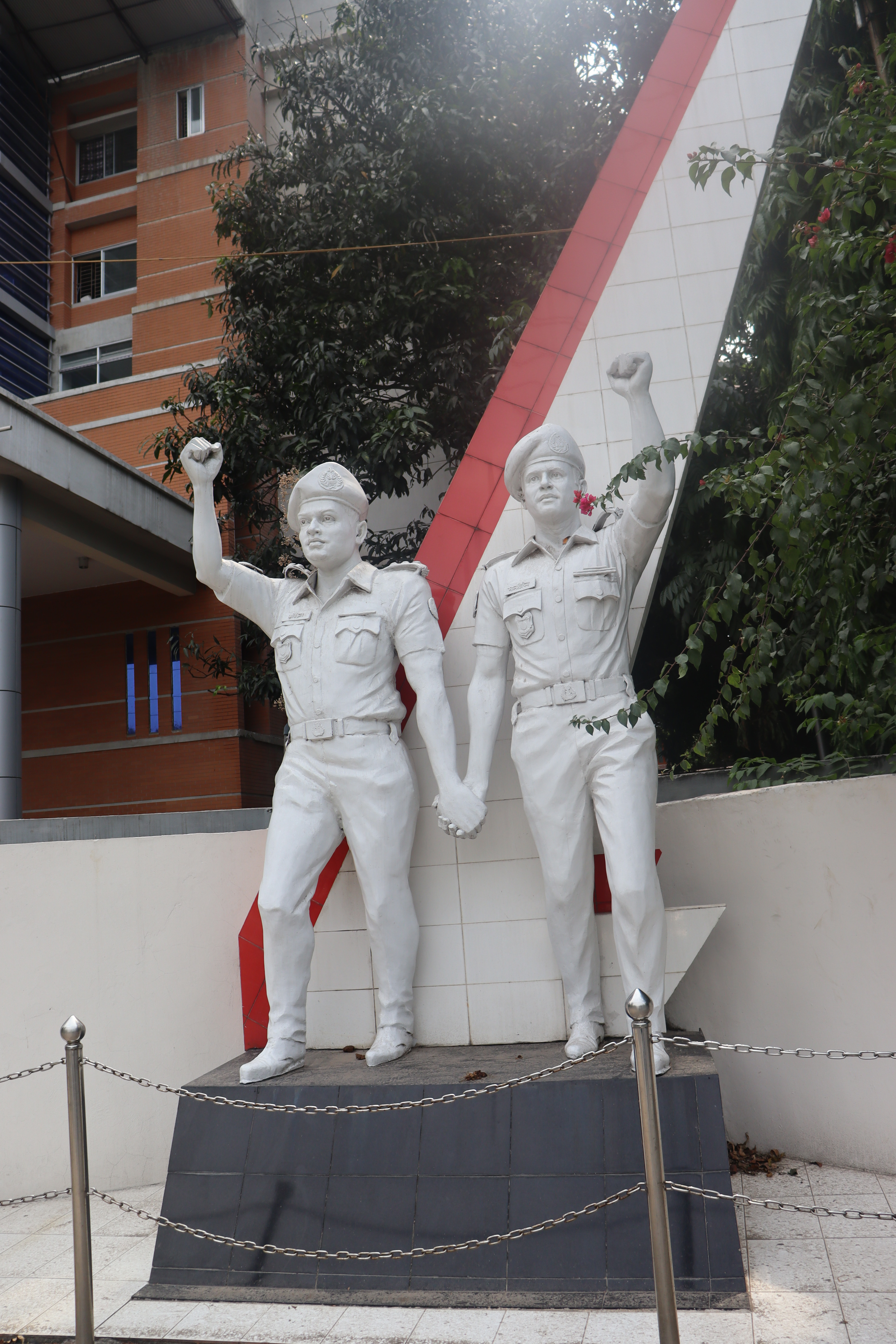
Deepto Shopoth sculpture in Gulshan, Dhaka.

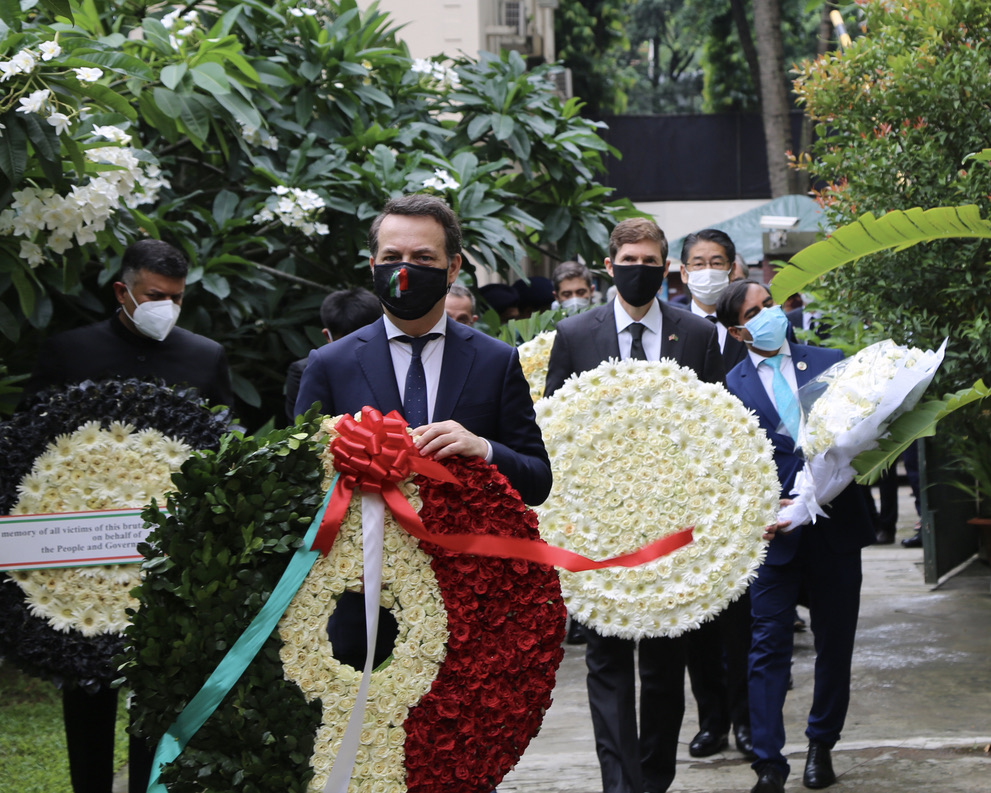
Ambassadors of various countries to Bangladesh paying tribute to the victims on the 5th anniversary of the attack

Two years after the attack, a memorial sculpture named "Deepto Shopoth" by Mrinal Haque was inaugurated in Gulshan in memory of the two policemen AC Rabiul and OC Salahuddin who were killed in the incident. On 29 August 2024, Following the resignation of Prime Minister Sheikh Hasina, the sculpture was demolished and replaced with posters of the banned Islamist organization Hizb ut-Tahrir Bangladesh.

The restaurant, Holey Artisan Bakery, lives on with its headquarters and "starter dough" moved to Bangkok, Thailand; where its first outlet was opened three weeks before the attack. The restaurant reopened in Dhaka under the name Oro Bakery due to name licensing issues in Bangladesh. The owner, Nasirul Alam Porag, and his family have since moved to Bangkok. The restaurant now has four outlets in Bangkok and one in Phuket as of March 2025.

== In popular culture ==
2019 Bangladeshi-German-Russian co-production film Shonibar Bikel and 2022 Indian film Faraaz are based on the event. The latter is an adaptation of Nuruzzaman Labu's 2017 non-fiction book Holey Artisan: A Journalistic Investigation.

== See also ==
- 2014 Sydney hostage crisis
- List of hostage crises
- Mohammad Saifullah Ozaki, the leader of Islamic State – Bengal Province at the time of the attack
- September 11 attacks
- Terrorism in Bangladesh
- Jihadism
