= Monirul Islam (police officer) =

Bangladeshi police officer (born 1970)

- মো: মনিরুল ইসলাম
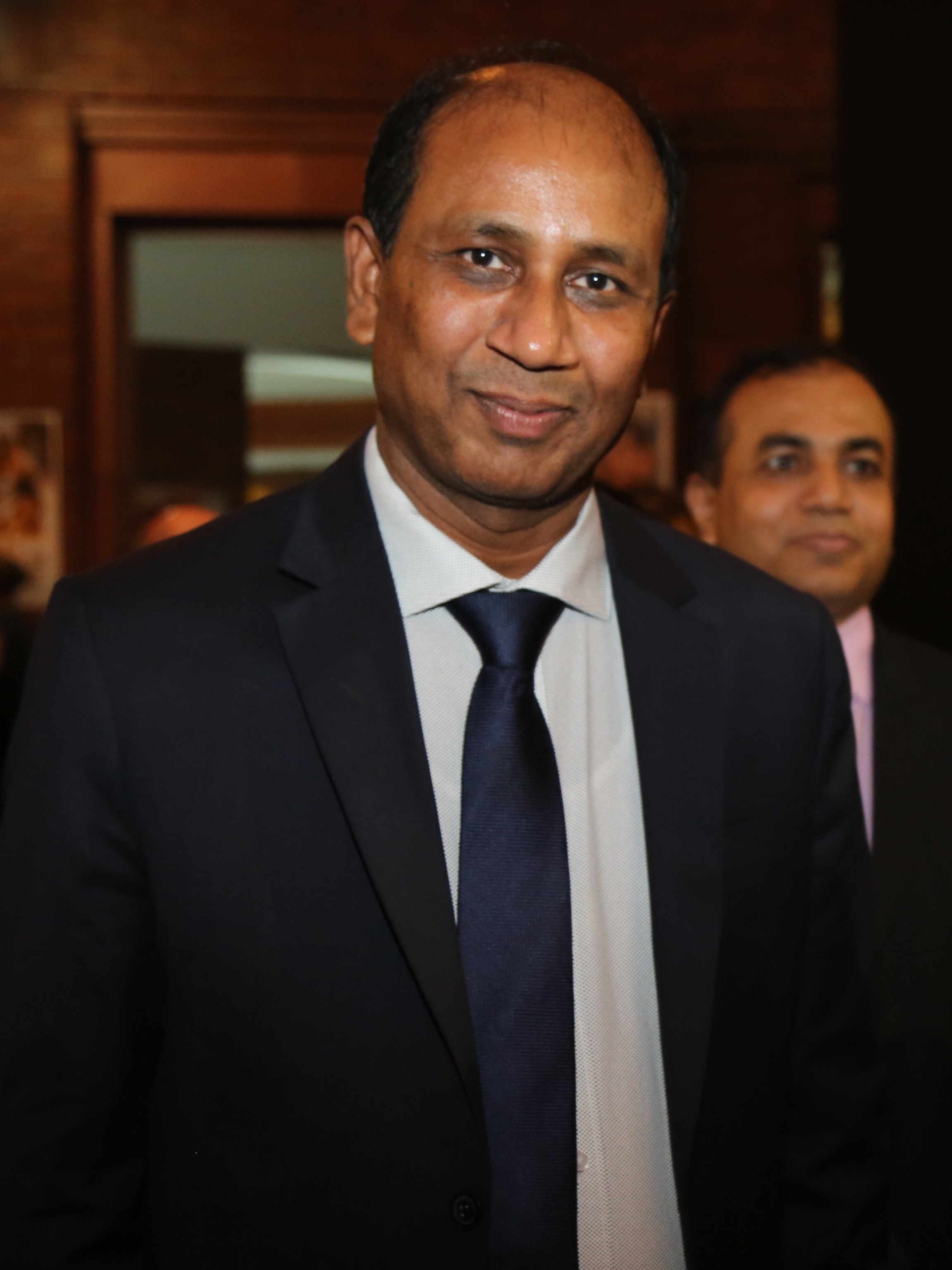
- Islam in 2017

Chief of Special Branch
- In office 14 March 2021 – 13 August 2024
- Preceded by: Mir Shahidul Islam
- Succeeded by: Md Shah Alam

Personal details
- Born: 15 June 1970 (age 56) Gopalganj, East Pakistan
- Education: Dhaka College; University of Dhaka; Northumbria University; Police Training Bangladesh Police Academy
- Awards: Bangladesh Police Medal, BPM (Bar); President Police Medal, PPM (bar)
- Police career
- Allegiance: Bangladesh
- Branch: Bangladesh Police
- Service years: 1995–2024
- Rank: Addl. IGP

Md. Monirul Islam (born 15 June 1970) is former additional inspector general of the Bangladesh Police who served as head of the Special Branch.

The position of chief (joint commissioner, carrying the rank of additional deputy inspector general) of Detective Branch (DB) of Dhaka Metropolitan Police (DMP) and the official spokesperson of this unit earned Islam much publicity. He came into wide attention as the point-man of the nation's counterterrorism offensive following Holey Artisan Bakery mayhem on July 1, 2016, which involved the killing by violent extremists of twenty-two lives: nineteen foreigners, three natives and two higher rank police personnel, as the chief of Counter Terrorism and Transnational Crime (CTTC) that he pioneered, and is at the helm till date. It subsequently, spotted and cracked a number of terror-dens as well as curbed down the soaring extremist graph by neutralizing many violent-operators.

== Early life ==
Islam was born in Gopalganj District. Islam did his graduation followed by master's in English from University of Dhaka. Later, he obtained his LLB in British Law from Northumbria University, UK. Islam did another master's, afterwards, in criminology along with his post graduate diploma (PGD) in genocide studies from University of Dhaka.

== Career ==
Islam joined Bangladesh Police as assistant superintendent of police (ASP) holding first place in the order of merit in the police batch through 15th Bangladesh Civil Service (BCS) Exams in 1995. From then on, he held diverse offices ranging from field level law enforcer in district/metropolitan police to counter-terrorism boss, with positions like law enforcement instructor, intelligence officer and supervisor of investigations in Bangladesh Police Academy, Special Branch and Detective Branch in between. However, he secured independent command as superintendents of police (SP) in two districts, too. He served as deputy commissioner and, on promotion, as joint commissioner of the Detective Branch were, in both capacities, he was the official spokesman, a prestigious internal appointment, of Dhaka Metropolitan Police.

During the 2001 to 2006 Bangladesh Nationalist Party rule, Islam was denied promotions and career advancements due to him being from Gopalganj District. In 2001, he was serving in the Chittagong Metropolitan Police. He was posted to Jhenaidah District, Barisal District and Traffic Training School. After the Bangladesh Nationalist Party government was replaced by a neutral caretaker government he was made superintendent of police of Bandarban District.

Islam is an adjunct faculty member in criminology of the University of Dhaka. He is a regular resourced speaker in national level workshops and training centers for professionals.

Islam is associated with number of service/alumni associations and non-profit advisory groups: he served, successfully, twice as the general secretary of Bangladesh Police Service Association (BPSA), as vice-president of Bangladesh Police Service Association for consecutive three years, as president of 15th BCS Forum for last three years, as vice-president of Bangladesh Society of Criminology (BSC), as president of Dhaka University Criminology Alumni Association, as advisor (honorary) of Bangladesh Peace Observatory (a think-tank group under Centre for Genocide Studies of University of Dhaka) and as advisor (honorary) of Center for Social Advocacy & Research Foundation (a think-tank in Bangladesh, specialized in research and security threat analysis). Islam promoted to additional inspector general of police (IGP) of grade-2 in January 2022.

== Awards ==
Islam was awarded the Bangladesh Police Medal for a fourth time, President Police Medal (PPM) twice, and IGP's Exemplary Good Services Badge once.

== Personal life ==
Islam was married to Saila Farzana, OSD Additional Secretary of the Ministry of Public Administration.
