= 2024 Sibi bombing =

Terrorist incident in Pakistan

- Location: Sibi, Balochistan, Pakistan
- Date: 30 January 2024
- Target: Pakistan Tehreek-e-Insaf, 2024 elections campaign
- Attack type: Bombing
- Weapon: Improvised Explosive Device
- Deaths: 4
- Injuries: 5
- Perpetrator: Islamic State – Pakistan Province

The 2024 Sibi bombing was a bombing done by Islamic State – Pakistan Province in Sibi against Pakistan Tehreek-e-Insaf during one of their political rallies for the 2024 Pakistani general election.

== Background ==
There were several heavy clashes between terrorists and security forces in Balochistan before the bombing.

== Attack ==
On 30 January a bomb went off during a political rally by Pakistan Tehreek-e-Insaf in the city of Sibi, the blast killed 4 people and injured 5.

== Aftermath ==
The Pakistan Tehreek-e-Insaf party condemned the bombing and stated the attention the bombing got should be used to suppress terrorists instead of the Pakistan Tehreek-e-Insaf party itself, PTI also called for a full investigation of the attack.

The United States Bureau of South and Central Asian Affairs made a post on X condemning the attack. They also stated that the Pakistani people have the 'right to choose their own leader', also condemning the attempt to undermine the election.
