= A B M Shawkat Ali =

Bangladeshi-Australian computer scientist and data analyst

- শওকত আলী
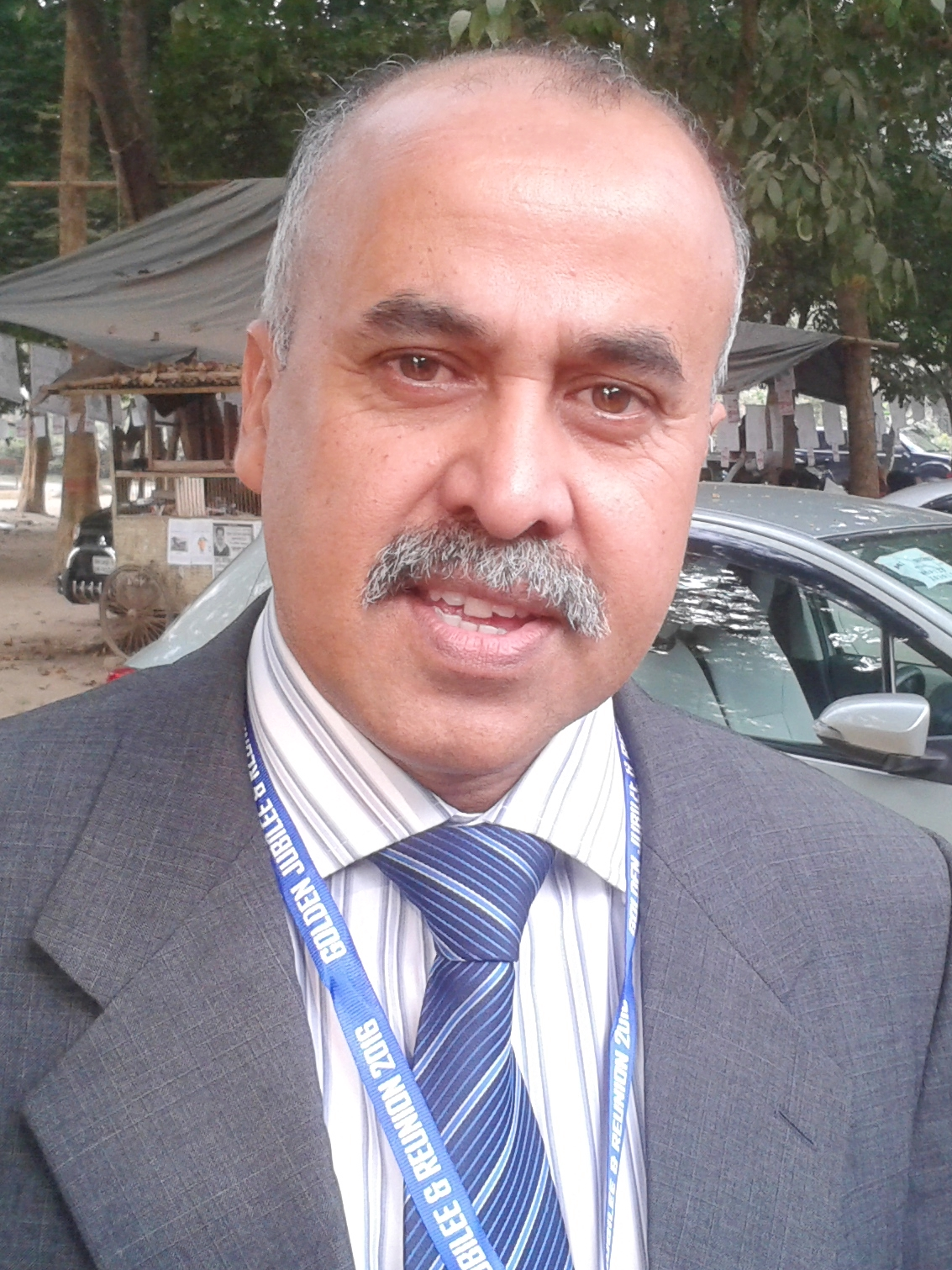
- Shawkat Ali at Rajshahi on 2016
- Pronunciation: Bengali pronunciation: [Ē bi ēma śa'ōkata ālī]
- Born: July 30, 1969 (age 57); Rajapur, Jamalpur, East Pakistan
- Education: Monash University
- Occupations: Computer scientist and data analyst
- Spouse: Jesmin Nahar

A B M Shawkat Ali is a Bangladeshi origin-Australian computer scientist, data analyst, and vice-chancellor of Bangladesh University of Business and Technology. He has written several books in the areas of data mining, computational intelligence, and Smart Grid. He is a newspaper columnist. He is an academic and researcher in the areas of machine learning and data science. He set up a research centre and conferences in data science and engineering. He is an adjunct professor in data science in the School of Engineering and Technology, Central Queensland University, Australia.

== Early life and education ==
Ali was born on July 30, 1969, in Rajapur, Jamalpur, East Pakistan (now Bangladesh). His father, Md. Saifuddin Sarker, was a farmer and businessman, and his mother, Soufia Khatun, was a housewife. Ali has two brothers and three sisters. He completed year five primary education with regional first position from Rajapur Primary School in 1978, Secondary School Certificate (SSC) in 1984 securing First Division from Bahruakhali M N A High School, Jamalpur, Higher Secondary Certificate (HSC) in 1984 also securing First Division from Nasirabad College, Mymensingh in 1986. Then he got admission to study electronics and applied physics engineering Honours degree at the University of Rajshahi by obtaining the number one position in the admission within the Faculty of Science.

In his Master's examination (1991) from Rajshahi University, he obtained the second position with first class by breaking the 12 years record marks from the project group and was awarded a National Ministry of Science (NST) scholarship to study Master of Philosophy (MPhil) in computer science and engineering from the same university.

== Professional career ==
Ali started his professional career by teaching as a lecturer in the Department of Computer Science and Engineering, at Islamic University, Bangladesh, in 1997. Then he was promoted to assistant professor in the same university in 1999. In 2001, Ali received the International Post Graduation Scholarship to pursue his PhD research at Monash University, Melbourne, Australia, in Information Technology with a major Statistical Learning Theory under Machine Learning. The same year, Ali joined the Gippsland School of Information Technology (GSIT), Monash University, as an assistant lecturer. After submitting his PhD thesis, he joined immediately as a lead lecturer in data mining at Central Queensland University in 2005. In 2006, Ali moved to Central Queensland University's main campus at Rockhampton, Queensland, Australia, and he was promoted to senior lecturer in the School of Computer Science in 2008. In 2007, he wrote a textbook that has been used in over 40 universities around the world. Again, Ali moved to the School of Engineering and Technology in 2013 at the same university. He worked as a visiting professor under Consumer Purchasing Behaviour Monitoring in 2013 at the School of Business, Kansai University, Japan.

In 2014, Ali moved to a South Pacific country – Fiji and joined as a professor in computer science under the Department of Computer Science and Information Technology at the University of Fiji, where he was appointed head of department. At the end of 2014, he resigned from his head of department position and joined as an executive dean for the School of Science and Technology at the same university. In 2017, he joined as a visiting faculty member for the MBA program at The University of the South Pacific. Ali served as an academic consultant to Fiji National University to establish post-grad (Post Grad Diploma, Master's, and PhD) programs in 2018.

He moved to Central Queensland University in 2019 as an adjunct professor in data science. Then he was appointed vice-chancellor of the Bangladesh University of Business and Technology in October 2024.

== Awards ==
- Vice-Chancellor's Research Excellence Award, The University of Fiji, 2014.
- Outstanding Leadership Award, 12th IEEE International Conference on Trust, Security and Privacy in Computing and Communications, 2013.
- Excellence in Supervision Award, Central Queensland University, Australia, 2007.
- Monash University Publication Awards, 2004.
- Bangladesh Expatriates' Award 2023 (Research Category), The People's Republic of Bangladesh, 2023

== Books ==
- Shawkat Ali, A. B. M.; Wasimi, Saleh A. (2007). Data mining: methods and techniques. Thomson Learning Australia. ISBN 978-0-17-013676-1.
- ——, ed. (2013). Smart Grids: Opportunities, Developments, and Trends. Green Energy and Technology. Springer-Verlag. ISBN 978-1-4471-5209-5.
- Khan, Zeashan; ——; Riaz, Zahid, eds. (2014). Computational Intelligence for Decision Support in Cyber-Physical Systems. Studies in Computational Intelligence. Springer. ISBN 978-981-4585-35-4.
- Hsu, Ching-Hsien; Wang, Shangguang; Zhou, Ao; ——, eds. (2016). Internet of Vehicles – Technologies and Services: Third International Conference, IOV 2016, Nadi, Fiji, December 7–10, 2016, Proceedings. Springer International Publishing. ISBN 978-3-319-51968-5.
- Fortino, Giancarlo; ——; Pathan, Mukaddim; Guerrieri, Antonio; Fatta, Giuseppe Di, eds. (2018). Internet and Distributed Computing Systems: 10th International Conference, IDCS 2017, Mana Island, Fiji, December 11-13, 2017, Proceedings. Springer. ISBN 978-3-319-97794-2.
