= February 2024 Balochistan bombings =

Bombings in Pakistan

- Part of the Insurgency in Balochistan
- Location: Pishin District and Killa Saifullah, Balochistan, Pakistan
- Date: 7 February 2024
- Target: 2024 elections campaign
- Attack type: Bombing
- Deaths: 28–30+
- Injuries: 40+
- Perpetrator: Islamic State – Pakistan Province

On 7 February 2024, twin bombings killed at least 30 people in Balochistan Province of Pakistan, targeting political campaign offices on the eve of the 2024 general election. At least 40 people were reported injured. The Islamic State – Pakistan Province (ISPP) claimed responsibility for both bombings, and said both attacks were carried out by motorbikes rigged with explosives.

== Background ==
In the run-up to the general election on 8 February, several attacks targeting election-related facilities had occurred in Balochistan Province, some of which were claimed by the Baloch Liberation Army, which had urged a boycott of the vote. More than two dozen attacks were reported across the province in the week before the bombings, while caretaker provincial home minister Muhammad Zubair Jamali said that almost 80% of Balochistan's 5,028 polling stations had been declared "sensitive". Jamiat Ulema-e-Islam (Fazl) (JUI-F), whose offices were targeted in the second attack, had previously seen one of its rallies targeted by a suicide bombing claimed by the Islamic State – Khorasan Province in July 2023.

== Events ==
The first blast, caused by an IED which was planted on a motorbike, killed at least 16 people outside the office of independent candidate Asfand Yar Khan Kakar in Pishin. IS claimed it was targeting an election gathering. Pishin Deputy Commissioner Jumadad Mandokhail said that all the victims were supporters of Kakar, and that the bombing occurred in Khanozai bazar. Another 23 people were injured. The injured were taken to the Medical Superintendent Tehsil Headquarters Hospital for treatment. The attack reportedly occurred while the candidate was meeting his polling agent, according to the BBC. About an hour-and-a-half later, a second explosion at the offices of the JUI-F killed 12 people and injured 18, four critically, in a bazaar in the Qilla Saifullah District. The deputy commissioner of Qilla Saifullah said the explosion originated from a device planted on a motorcycle parked near the office. At the time of the explosion, there were a large number of workers inside the building according to police reports. Some of the injured were airlifted by helicopter to the provincial capital, Quetta.

== Aftermath ==
The Foreign Ministry announced the closure of the country's borders with Afghanistan and Iran until 9 February to ensure security during the election.

The Islamic State claimed responsibility for both attacks in a statement posted on Telegram. They released a statement on its affiliated Amaq News Agency taking responsibility for the bombings, claiming that the bombing in Pishin killed and wounded around 45 "apostates", and the bombing in Killa Saifullah killed and wounded another 35. On 9 February, Inter-Services Public Relations, the media wing of the Pakistani military, issued a statement claiming the mastermind of the bombings was killed during an intelligence-based operation. According to them, Abdul Shakoor of IS, who allegedly planned to conduct further high-profile attacks in Balochistan, was killed during an exchange of fire in Killa Saifullah district.

== Reactions ==
=== Domestic ===
President Arif Alvi condemned the attacks and expressed sympathies to the families of the victims of the attack. Caretaker Prime Minister Anwaar ul Haq Kakar denounced the bombings and expressed condolences to the families of the dead, vowing that "every attempt to sabotage the law and order situation will be thwarted" and pledging the government's commitment to hold elections peacefully. The Balochistan provincial government announced three days of mourning but emphasized that the elections will take place as scheduled. PML-N leader Nawaz Sharif condemned the attacks, saying that they "cannot dampen our spirits". Former President Asif Ali Zardari and Pakistan People's Party Chairman Bilawal Bhutto Zardari both condemned the attacks, expressing "deep sorrow and regret" over the loss of lives. Bilawal said that the planners of the attack should be "punished severely" according to the law, and that targeting civilians is a barbaric act.

=== International ===
British High Commissioner to Pakistan Jane Marriott said that she was "appalled" by the attacks and condemned "those seeking to prevent people from voting".

The Egyptian Foreign Ministry condemned the attacks and expressed condolences and sympathy to the government and people of Pakistan. It also reaffirmed its stance against terrorism, calling upon nations to cut off funding sources and to not allow safe havens for terrorists.

The spokesperson of the Iranian embassy in Islamabad denounced the bombings and expressed condemnation over the loss of lives and injuries caused by the incident. He also conveyed Iran's solidarity with the Pakistani people.

The Saudi Arabian Ministry of Foreign Affairs condemned the bombings "in the strongest terms", affirming its stance against terrorism and extremism and expressing solidarity with Pakistan and its people.

The Emirati Ministry of Foreign Affairs affirmed the UAE's strong condemnation of such criminal acts and its permanent rejection of all forms of violence and terrorism. The ministry expressed its sincere condolences and sympathy to Pakistan's government and the victim's families, as well as its wishes for a speedy recovery to all those injured.

=== Organizations ===
United Nations Secretary-General António Guterres "strongly condemned" the bombings, and his spokesperson added that the attacks were "clearly related" to the elections being held the following day.

Amnesty International voiced concern over the escalation of violence targeting election candidates and political entities, particularly in Balochistan and Khyber Pakhtunkhwa following the bombings. It condemned the violence, calling it a "blatant infringement on the democratic process" and a violation of human rights.

== See also ==
- 2026 Islamabad mosque bombing
