= Mohammad Saifullah Ozaki =

Bangladeshi-Japanese academic and militant (born 1982)

1st Emir of Islamic State – Bengal Province
- In office June 2015 – March 2019
- Preceded by: Office established
- Succeeded by: Abu Muhammed al-Bengali

Personal details
- Born: Sajit Chandra Debnath সজিত চন্দ্র দেবনাথ; 1982 (age 43–44) Nabinagar, Bangladesh
- Children: 6
- Education: Ritsumeikan Asia Pacific University (BBA, MBA, PhD); Kyushu University (DBE)

Mohammad Saifullah Ozaki (Note: Bengali: মোহাম্মদ সাইফুল্লাহ ওজাকি; Japanese: モハメド・サイフラ・オザキ) (born Sajit Chandra Debnath in 1982), also known by the kunya Shaykh Abu Ibrahim al-Hanif, is a Bangladeshi and Japanese academic and militant and former member of the Islamic State. Born to a Hindu family in Bangladesh, Ozaki studied in Japan, where he acquired several degrees, converted from Hinduism to Islam, and eventually married and became a naturalised Japanese citizen. He was an associate professor at Ritsumeikan University in Kyoto until 2015, when he and his family disappeared from the country. He was named the emir of the Islamic State in Bangladesh. He is alleged to have been responsible for promoting the Islamic State on Facebook and recruiting Bangladeshis to travel to Syria to support it, as well as plotting a terrorist attack in Dhaka. In March 2019, Ozaki surrendered to the Syrian Democratic Forces in Baghouz, Syria. A new emir for the Islamic State in Bengal was named within two months.

== Early life and education ==
Mohammad Saifullah Ozaki was born in 1982 as Sajit Chandra Debnath to Hindu parents Janardan Debnath and Anima Rani Debi in Nabinagar, Bangladesh, about 50 kilometres (31 mi) from Dhaka. Before leaving for Japan, his mother stated that he would spend his time reading books and praying in Hindu temples. In 2001, he passed his higher secondary exams at Sylhet Cadet College, travelling to Japan the next year to study at Ritsumeikan Asia Pacific University with a Japanese government scholarship, where he earned a bachelor's degree in business administration. He attended graduate school at the same university, having earned both a master's degree and PhD by March 2011, also obtaining a doctorate with business expertise from Kyushu University in 2010. According to a Dhaka Tribune article, he is considered an expert on Islamic finance and economic theory, and "well-versed" in Islamic theology.

== Academic career and radicalisation ==
Debnath authored or co-authored over thirty papers over the course of his academic career. He began teaching at Kyoto's Ritsumeikan University in 2011, becoming an associate professor of business administration at the College of International Relations in April 2015. His family noticed him behaving unusually as early as 2008, when he returned to Bangladesh to attend his sister's wedding, attempting to hide the beard that he had grown with a surgical mask. His last contact with his family was on 5 January 2016, when Debnath's father called him to ask about a recent police inquiry. During the call, Debnath claimed that a friend of his was framing him for funding a charitable organisation. When asked why he was funding an organisation considered "bad" by authorities, Debnath ended the call.

According to his father, Debnath converted from Hinduism to Islam—something he was secretive about but his mother said would not have been a problem with their family—and took the name Mohammad Saifullah Ozaki while living in Japan, but before marrying his Japanese wife and acquiring Japanese citizenship. In 2014, he met Gazi Sohan, a member of the extremist Neo JMB organisation (a breakaway faction of Jamaat-ul-Mujahideen Bangladesh that pledged its support to ISIL in 2014) on an Islam-related Facebook group for graduates of Bangladeshi military academies. After joining the group in January, Ozaki met Sohan in person at a mosque in Dhaka in May. It was at the mosque that Ozaki told Sohan that with a Japanese visa, Sohan could easily enter Turkey, through which he could reach Syria to join ISIL. Ozaki became Sohan's visa guarantor, allowing him to stay at his house in Japan that November. The next month, Ozaki instructed Sohan to travel from Turkey to Syria, which Sohan did via bus. Ozaki had begun attempting to organise an online jihadi cell at some point in early 2014 in anticipation of the declaration of a global caliphate, which would be done later that year by ISIL, in the form of the Islamic State.

== Militancy ==
Ozaki left Japan for Bulgaria in late 2015, and his whereabouts became unclear for a period after that. He took the kunya (a type of Islamic nom de guerre) Shaykh Abu Ibrahim al-Hanif sometime around May 2015, likely because a captured Sohan and another Islamic State member revealed his identity to Bangladeshi security forces. The first part of Ozaki's kunya, Abu Ibrahim, means "father of Ibrahim", after the name of his youngest son at the time, and the second part, al-Hanif, was believed by two independent anonymous Islamic theologians to reference the concept of hanifiyyah and signify Ozaki's rejection of polytheism. This is not typical for the kunya of an Islamic State member—most make reference to nationality or ethnicity, such as al-Bengali for a Bangladeshi member or al-Yabani for a Japanese member. Soon after, in June, the central leadership of the Islamic State appointed Ozaki as emir of the Islamic State in Bangladesh, which was approved by Abu Ubaydah Abd al-Hakim al-Iraqi on behalf of Abu Bakr al-Baghdadi. He was fired from his job at Ritsumeikan University in March 2016 due to his unapproved absence since January.

During his time as a member of the Islamic State, Ozaki used Facebook to spread their ideology and financed sabotage in Bangladesh. An analysis of Bangladeshi Islamic State members found that Ozaki was the "kingpin" of the Islamic State's recruiting efforts in Bangladesh, and that "most, if not all" of the group's Bangladeshi members were recruited by Ozaki himself or recruiters who served him. Anonymous sources used by the Bangladeshi newspaper Prothom Alo stated that most of Ozaki's Bangladeshi recruits heading to Syria had studied at cadet colleges in Bangladesh. In an interview published by the Islamic State's magazine Dabiq in April 2016, Ozaki, identified only by his kunya, claimed that the organisation was recruiting growing numbers of Bangladeshis, and described the region of Bengal as important to the caliphate and of potential use to further its jihad into India and Myanmar. He also described an approaching alliance between Islamic State militants in Bangladesh and the Islamic State Wilayat Khurasan in Afghanistan and Pakistan, led by former Taliban member Hafiz Saeed Khan. He further called for the "[targeting] in mass numbers" of Bangladesh's Hindu minority, accusing them of wielding important power in the country, specifically alleging that they were "cow worshippers" who created "anti-Islamic propaganda".

On 1 July 2016, five militants attacked a bakery in Dhaka, taking dozens of hostages, including 18 foreigners. Twenty hostages and two police officers were killed, as well as all five militants. Multiple sources claimed that Ozaki was believed to be responsible for planning the attack, although Fuji News Network (FNN) stated that Japanese media reported more on nuances such as his role in funding Islamic State as opposed to such direct accusations about his responsibility for the incident. His location remained unknown, variously reported to be in Syria, Indonesia, or Malaysia. He was wanted by Bangladeshi authorities along with nine other suspects for his alleged role.

In March 2019, Ozaki was one of ten Bangladeshi militants to surrender to the US-backed Syrian Democratic Forces in Baghouz, Syria after the former Islamic State stronghold fell. A new emir of the Islamic State in Bengal, Abu Muhammed al-Bengali, was named that May.

He was detained in the Kurdish city Sulaymaniyah in northern Iraq, where he remained as of May of that year. FNN stated that he is the first Japanese Islamic State fighter captured in Syria. The last news of his whereabouts was his detention in Sulaymaniyah in 2019.

=== Identity of al-Hanif ===
While a 2017 Dhaka Tribune article identified Ozaki as having "most likely" been the individual the Islamic State called its emir of Bengal, al-Hanif, it also mentioned that a Bangladeshi newspaper had previously speculated that al-Hanif was actually Tamim Ahmed Chowdhury in June 2016. This claim was refuted by the Islamic State in October 2016, which stated that Chowdhury's real kunya was Abu Dujanah al-Bengali and that he was the "former head of military and covert operations of the soldiers of the Khilafah in Bengal". This announcement came the same month as an article by The Daily Star that identified Chowdhury, who died after jumping off a five-storey building during a raid by the Rapid Action Battalion, as al-Hanif.

== Personal life ==
Ozaki introduced his father to a female neighbour named Rina during a visit in 2006, whom Ozaki married in 2007. The pair had at least six children, (Note: A 2017 Dhaka Tribune article stated that the two had three sons named after Islamic prophets, the youngest being named Ibrahim. Ibrahim was not mentioned by later articles by FNN and Prothom Alo describing the whereabouts of the rest of Ozaki's family as of 2019.) two of whom, Muhammad and Umme, were killed in an airstrike, along with Rina. Three others, seven-year-old Isha, three-year-old Yousuf, and one-year-old Sarah were still alive and in Syria as of May 2019. FNN later reported on 22 May that the surviving children had arrived in Japan, aided by the Japanese government. FNN writer Akari Iiyama described Ozaki's Dabiq interview as expressing his anger and hate toward unbelievers. She stated that despite having lived, studied, and worked in the country, Ozaki failed to assimilate to Japanese values, instead developing an anti-Japanese ideology and ending up being responsible for the deaths of Japanese citizens, who were among the foreign nationals who died in the bakery attack.
