= SWAT (Bangladesh) =

Police tactical unit

Special Weapons And Tactics
- বিশেষ অস্ত্র ও কৌশল (Bengali)
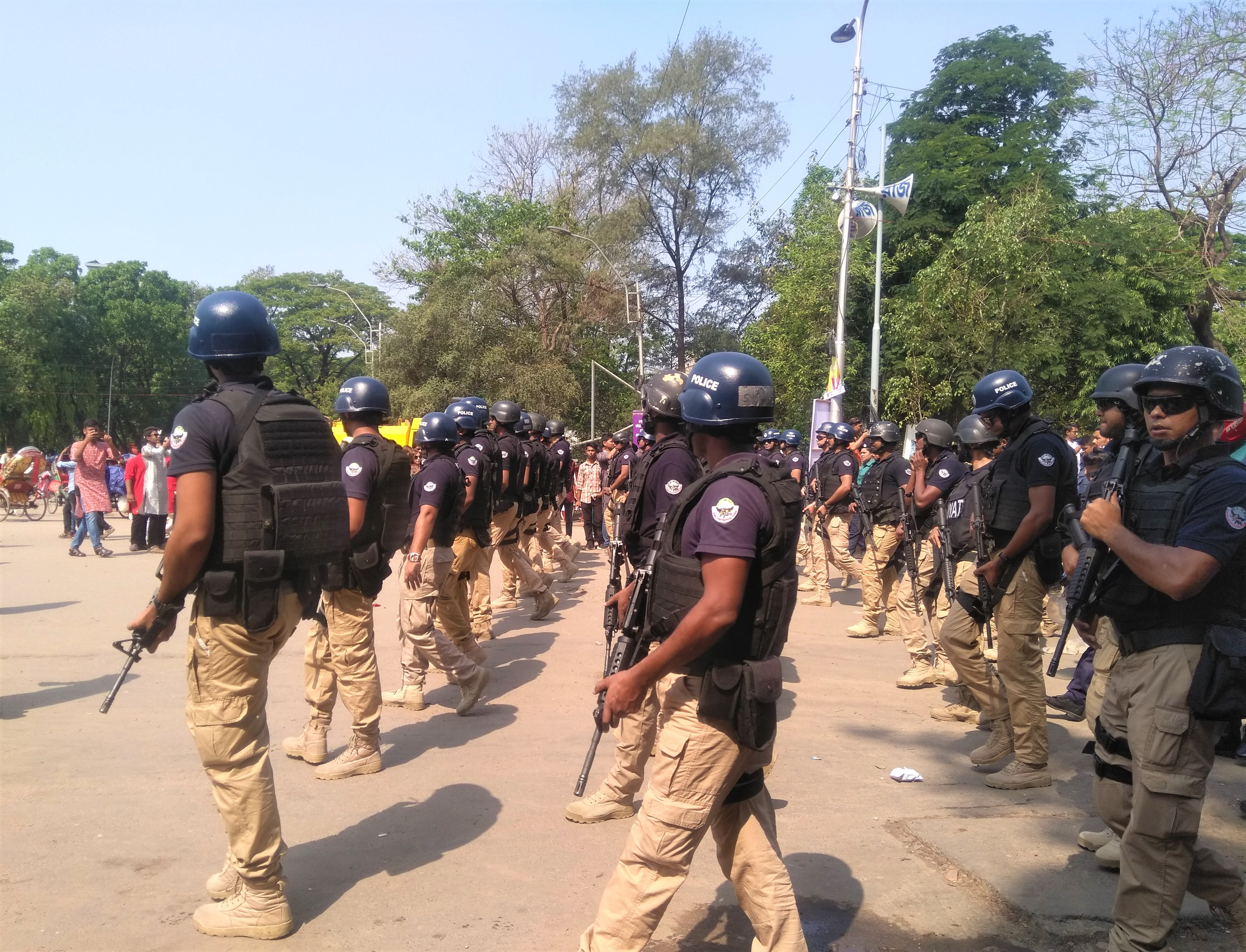
- SWAT officers during Mangal Shobhajatra.
- Active: 2009–present
- Country: Bangladesh
- Agency: Dhaka Metropolitan Police
- Type: Police tactical unit
- Operations jurisdiction: National
- Part of: Counter Terrorism and Transnational Crime
- Abbreviation: SWAT

Structure
- Officers: 70

The Special Weapons And Tactics (Bengali: বিশেষ অস্ত্র ও কৌশল; SWAT) is a tier two police tactical unit of the Dhaka Metropolitan Police (DMP) of the Bangladesh Police. They operate under the Special Action Group of the Counter Terrorism and Transnational Crime (CTTC). The SWAT was formed to recover illegal arms and arrest hardcore terrorists and has a vital role in neutralizing any and all threats.

The unit has been regularly deployed outside of Dhaka to respond to terrorist incidents. The Bangladesh Police plans to establish counterterrorism and hostage rescue unit similar to Bangladesh SWAT in all of the Metropolitan Police. A Crisis Response Team (CRT) has been established in Chittagong, Sylhet and in Rajshahi that were trained in the United States and in Jordan.

Bangladesh Swat Team during trainning

Bangladeshi Swat Operator showcasing his tactical weapon and gear

Bangladeshi Swat behind his Vehicle

== History ==
The SWAT was established on 28 February 2009 as part of the Detective Branch of the DMP under the control of the Dhaka Metropolitan Police Commissioner. The SWAT team was scheduled to be operational by March 1 of that year, ready for deployment both within Dhaka and, if necessary, beyond. The unit was designed to be more formidable than the Bangladesh Police's elite tactical unit, the Rapid Action Battalion (RAB), and could be mobilized to deal with terrorist groups and high-level criminal threats.

The SWAT completed a 45-day training program conducted by nine United States experts from the Army, FBI SWAT, and Police which was financed by the United States. The United States also provided equipment including M4 carbines, SR-25/AR-10 sniper rifles and Glock 17 pistols.

In 2016, the SWAT was placed under the command of the newly formed Counter Terrorism and Transnational Crime. In the same year, the SWAT had 50 members, with 20 new recruits to receive training in the United States with the SWAT aiming to expand to the unit to 100 members.

In 2017, the United States Bureau of Diplomatic Security (DS), Anti-terrorism Assistance Program (ATA) trained nine SWAT instructors over 7 weeks who conducted two refresher Crisis Response Team courses for 42 SWAT members.

US made BATT-X APC used by Bangladesh Police special force SWAT/CRT.

== Operations ==
The SWAT was deployed for security during the 2008 Bangladeshi general election, Pahela Baishakh and at Shaheed Minar during celebrations for International Mother Language Day.

Bangladeshi Swat being deployed

The SWAT has deployed to many terrorist or militant attacks, including outside of Dhaka in 2017 to Chapainawabganj for Operation "Eagle Hunt" and to Chapainawabganj for Operation "Hit Back". In July 2016, the SWAT responded to the Holey Artisan Bakery terrorist attack in Gulshan Thana with eight SWAT members seriously injured.

== See also ==
- Dhaka Metropolitan Police
- Rapid Action Battalion
