= Islamic State – Bengal Province =

Bengali branch of the Salafi jihadist group IS

- الدَولة الإسْلامية – ولاية البِنغال
- Logo of the Bengal Province
- Leaders: Shaykh Abu Ibrahim al-Hanif (2015-2019); Abu Muhammed al-Bengali (2019-2020); Abu Abbas al-Bengali (2020-present)
- Dates active: 2015–present
- Headquarters: Bangladesh
- Active regions: Bangladesh
- Ideology: Daeshism
- Size: 300 (2015); 50 (2026)
- Part of: Islamic State
- Wars: the war on terror

Islamic State – Bengal Province (Note: Bengali: ইসলামিক স্টেট – বঙ্গ প্রদেশ, romanized: Isalāmika sṭēṭa – baṅga pradēśa, Hindi: इस्लामिक स्टेट-बंगाल प्रांत, romanized: islaamik stet-bangaal praant, Arabic: الدَولة الإسْلامية – ولاية البِنغال, romanized: aldawlt al'islamyt - wilayat albinghal) (IS-BP) is an administrative division of the Islamic State, a Salafi jihadist militant group. The group was announced by ISIL as its province in 2016. The first emir of Wilayat al-Bengal, Abu Ibrahim al-Hanif, is believed to be Mohammad Saifullah Ozaki (born as Sajit Chandra Debnath, 1982) a Bangladeshi Japanese economist who went to Syria in 2015 and joined IS. A Hindu convert to Islam, he reportedly led the July 2016 Dhaka attack. He was detained in Iraq in 2019 and Abu Muhammed al-Bengali was announced as the new emir of the province.

Neo-Jamaat-ul-Mujahideen Bangladesh, an offshoot of Jamaat-ul-Mujahideen Bangladesh (Al-Qaeda affiliated), effectively operates as the main IS branch in Bangladesh.

It has been designated as a Foreign Terrorist Organization under the SDN by the United States Department of the Treasury's Office of Foreign Assets Control, with addresses in Dhaka, Rangpur, Sylhet and Jhenaidah. It has also been designated as a terrorist organization by Canada.

== Background ==
=== IS in South Asia ===
ISIL activity originated in Iraq, and has spread from the Middle East to the African countries of Egypt, Mali and Somalia; South Asian countries such as Bangladesh, Pakistan and India, and southeast Asian countries such as Indonesia and the Philippines. The group aims to retake Greater Khorasan, a historical region which covers Afghanistan and part of Central Asia. The Khorasan branch of ISIL is based in South Asia.

The terrorist organisation has used social unrest, the dissolution of language barriers, and local underground support to recruit South Asian militants for global jihad. The flow of Rohingya Muslim refugees from Myanmar has been targeted for recruitment by ISIL when the refugees enter Bangladesh. Some of these refugees are also targeted and supported by Bangladesh Jamaat-e-Islami (BJeI), the country's largest Islamist political party.

In 2002, the Bangladeshi extremist group Jamatul Mujahideen Bangladesh (JMB) formed a committee in Malda City, India. JMB is the most active extremist group in Bangladesh, and has linked itself to ISIL. The group exploited permeable borders between India and Bangladesh to transport explosives, and are believed to be responsible for the Bardham bombing near the India-Bangladesh border in 2014. JMB, which was funded and militarized by the Taliban in the AfPak region before receiving ISIL support, targets minorities in Bangladesh.

Attacks inspired by ISIL have occurred across South Asia, including Quetta, Pakistan, Kabul, Afghanistan and Dhaka, Bangladesh. Youths from these countries have increasingly travelled from South Asia to Syria and Iraq. ISIL influences, recruits, strategises and organises with social media. Indian cells of ISIL have been identified by Indian forces in Madhya Pradesh, Kalyan, Kerala, Hyderabad, and Uttar and Madhya Pradesh. ISIL is most present in India through online social networks. The group has also attempted to infiltrate the unstable union territory of Jammu and Kashmir, a region disputed by India and Pakistan for religious and territorial reasons.

=== IS in Bangladesh (2014-2017) ===
Bangladesh is a secular democracy with a majority-Muslim population and a low median standard of living. Since its independence from Muslim Pakistan in 1971, Islamic extremism and the push for a united Islamic state across the subcontinent has been a catalyst for homegrown action and international interest in Bangladesh. Bombings, shootings and stabbings have been claimed by ISIL, targeting Westerners and other foreigners and Shia Muslims. Most attacks in Bangladesh are made by proxy groups later claimed (or attributed) to ISIL, and the amount of direct ISIL influence is unclear.

In June 2014, ISIL declared themselves a worldwide caliphate with Abu Bakr al-Baghdadi as their leader. That August, ISIL distributed a video of Bengalis pledging allegiance to the group in Bengali. Bangladesh was not included in the group's five-year plan published that year, despite its being a Muslim-majority country. Since 2015, the government of Bangladesh has adopted a vocal, zero-tolerance policy towards terrorism and Islamic extremism. ISIL has admitted targeting (and attacking) secular Bangladeshis, Shia Muslims, foreigners, bloggers and other individuals who oppose their goal. The group has a sizable online presence in Bangladesh through social media, and a growing physical influence (despite government denial).

Domestic terrorist organizations are increasingly active with the support of transnational organizations such as ISIL, both physically and online through social media. Since 2013, over 40 vocal secularists have been murdered by these homegrown groups. According to JMB and ISIL, JMB members were acting on ISIL's behalf in Bangladesh. The group recruits in wealthy areas of Dhaka (such as Banani) and in places where youths gather for studying and coaching. The Bangladeshi government calls the group the "neo-JMB".

=== Volunteering in foreign wars ===
During the Syrian Civil War and ISIL rampage in Middle East, many Bangladeshi individuals joined the war with ISIS. A militant group called "Al-Britani Bridge Bangladesh Bad Boys" was created and was consisted of British Bangladeshis from Portsmouth who went to fight in the Syrian Civil War in 2013. The group, which was recruited by Portsmouth jihadi Ifthekar Jaman, had 5 members who went to fight in Syria for ISIS but only 1 survived and others were killed in the battles.

== Timeline ==
=== 2015 ===
- May: A deadly attack was carried out by the ISIL-affiliated extremist group Jundullah in which 46 Shia Muslims were targeted for their opposing religious views.
- 28 September: Italian citizen Tavella Cesare was murdered whilst jogging in Dhaka. The Bangladeshi suspects told police that they were hired by an entity they called "Big Brother" to kill a foreigner. Although none of the arrested men made any overt reference to ISIL, the attack was claimed by the terrorist group.
- 3 October: Japanese national Kunio Hoshi was shot to death in Mahigonj, Rangpur District. Although the police blamed JMB for the attack, responsibility was claimed by ISIL in their online publication. Two days later, militants stabbed Luke Sarker,a baptist pastor from Pabna, Pabna District, Rajshahi Division. Sarker survived to the assault. In October five suspected militants were arrested by the security forces for its relationship with the attacks.
- 24 October: ISIL affiliates claimed responsibility for a bombing outside Huseini Dalan, a place of worship in Dhaka, where the attackers targeted a Shi’ite gathering. Two people were killed, and about 100 were injured.
- November: An interview, "The Revival of Jihad in Bengal", was published in the ISIL magazine Dabiq.
- 4 November: ISIL claimed responsibility for an attack on a police checkpoint in which a police officer was killed.
- 8 November: Terrorist opened fire on Ruhul Amin in Rangpur, Rangpur Division, Bangladesh. The attack left one wounded.
- 10 November: IS militants killed Rahmat Ali. with a knife, a caretaker of a Muslim shrine, the stabbing took place in Kaunia Upazila, Rangpur division. In march of 2018, 7 militants were sentenced to death for the murder of Rahmat Ali.
- 18 November: IS Terrorist opened fire on Piero Parolari an italian catholic priest, resultseriously wounded for the attack.
- 25 November: The group claimed responsibility for a suicide attack at an Ahmadiyya mosque. In addition to the dead bomber, about a dozen people were injured. In the next day, militants attack a shia mosque in
- 5 December: Three explosive devices blasts at the Kantaji Hindu temple near Dinajpur, Dinajpur division, Bangladesh. At least 10 people were wounded in the attack.
- 18 December: IS terrorist threw various explosive devices at a mosque during prayer services at the Chittagong naval base in Chittagong, Chittagong Division. The attack left eight navy employees.
- 25 December: A suicide bomber blast in Ahmadi Mosque, Bagmara Upazila, the attack left the attacker dead and three civilians wounded.

=== 2016 ===
During the first six months of 2016, ISIL carried out eleven attacks throughout Bangladesh. They launched religiously-motivated attacks against Hindus in Bonpara, Dhaka, Jhenaidah and Rangpur, Christians in Bonpara, Rangpur and Kushtia District, and targeted a Buddhist leader in Jhenaidah.

- 8 January: IS militants claims the murder of Samir al-Din, a Christian convert, in Jhenaidah, Khulna Division. The attackers justified the murder by conversion to Christianity of the victim.
- 21 February: Armed militants attack with explosive devices, firearms, and cleaversat a temple complex in Debiganj Upazila, Panchagarh District. The attack left Jogeswar Roy (a Hindu priest) killed ant other two worshippers wounded, ISIS and Jamaat-ul-Mujahideen Bangladesh claimed separately the attack.
- 14 March: Hafiz Abdul Razak, a Shia cleric, was stabbed to death in Khulna, Jhenaidah District in an assassination for which ISIL claimed responsibility.
- 22 March: Militants hacked to death a Christian convert in Kurigram, Rangpur, the assailants detonated various explosive devices as they fled the scene.
- 23 April: University professor Rezaul Karim Siddique was murdered with machetes in Rajshahi. Although responsibility for the attack was claimed by ISIL, officials believed that it may have been a copycat crime rather than one committed by the group.
- 25 April: Two men were killed with machetes by militants in an attack claimed by ISIL. One, Xulhaz Mannan, was an activist for gay rights in Bangladesh. Editor of the country's only LGBT magazine, he had been living at the American embassy in Dhaka.
- 30 April: ISIS claims the murder of Nikhil Chandra Joardar, a Hindu Tailor. The murder took place in Tangail, Dhaka District.
- 25 May: The murder of a Hindu businessman was attributed to the group.
- 7 June: A Hindu monk was murdered by militants in western Bangladesh in an attack claimed by ISIL, and an elderly Christian grocer was hacked to death in Bonpara.
- 1 July: On the last Friday of Ramadan, five young JMB members stormed the Holey Artisan Bakery in Dhaka's Gulshan Thana neighbourhood. Its occupants were taken hostage, and the attackers targeted foreigners or Muslims not deemed sufficiently devout. Twenty-two people were killed (18 of whom were foreigners), and 50 others were injured. It is referred as "July 2016 Dhaka attack." It was the largest extremist attack in Bangladesh since 1996. The attackers discriminated between foreigners and Bangladeshi citizens, and (of the Bangladeshis) between fundamentalist and moderate Muslims. Those who could quote the Quran were spared and treated well, and those who could not were executed. The attack was broadcast live to ISIL-affiliated social-media accounts with the bakery's WiFi. Photos of the attackers in front of ISIL flags were displayed. Bangladesh's prime minister denied ISIL involvement, attributing the attack to domestic militancy. It was the worst attack in over a decade, when JMB set of synchronised bombs throughout Bangladesh which killed two dozen people.
- 7 July: A suicide attack near the Eidgah in Sholakia killed four members of a large Eid al-Fitr congregation. It was prompted by ISIL and their followers' belief that any form of Islam other than Salafism is too moderate and justifies jihad.

=== 2017 ===
- 17 March: A militant suspected of being a JMB member entered a Rapid Action Battalion compound with an explosive belt in an attempted suicide-bomb attack. The attacker detonated his vest when he was approached by two compound officials, killing himself and wounding them.
- 24 March: ISIL claimed responsibility for a failed suicide-bomb attack at a police checkpoint near Shahjalal International Airport in Dhaka. The attack killed the militant, but there were no other injuries. It was suspected that the bomb detonated prematurely.
- 25 March: Eight people were killed, including two police officers, and more than 40 were injured in a dual bombing in Sylhet. Military and police forces were attempting to raid a militant safe house believed to belong to ISIL when the explosions occurred; one came from a man on a motorbike, and the other was planted in a bag of vegetables. According to the Bangladesh Army, the militants were detonating other bombs around the city. The attack occurred on the first observance of Bengali Genocide Remembrance Day.
- November: A Biman Bangladesh Airlines pilot pled guilty to conspiring to crash a passenger plane into Ganabhaban, Prime Minister Sheikh Hasina's residence.

=== 2025 ===
- Between April and June 2025, Malaysian authorities arrested 36 Bangladeshi migrant workers suspected of being linked to the Islamic State (IS). The group, reportedly operating under the name Gerakan Militan Radikal Bangladesh, was accused of recruiting fellow Bangladeshi workers through social media platforms such as Facebook, WhatsApp, and Telegram, while also collecting membership fees and donations to fund ISIS operations abroad. Recruits allegedly pledged allegiance (bai’ah) online and attended religious gatherings to further radicalize members. Malaysian police stated that some of the funds were transferred using e-wallets like Touch ‘n Go and the Bangladeshi mobile banking service bKash. Five individuals have been charged under Malaysia’s anti-terrorism laws, sixteen remain in detention under the Security Offences Act (SOSMA), and fifteen are being deported. Bangladeshi authorities confirmed they are cooperating with Malaysia and have launched parallel investigations against the deportees. Later, on August 15, two were sent to a Malaysian court.

== Bangladeshi response ==
Despite many attacks attributed to ISIL by police and claimed by the organization, the government denies its presence in Bangladesh and has been slow to react to homegrown threats. One reason for the denial is Bangladesh's position as home to the world's second-largest garment industry (after China). Terrorist attacks and a government-confirmed ISIL presence might damage foreign trust in the country, affecting travel and trade.

JMB leader Bangla Bhai was hanged in 2007 for murder. The group has been announced as an ISIL branch in Bangladesh, despite the government's denial of an ISIL presence in the country. The United States Office of Foreign Assets Control and the State Department have identified an "ISIS-Bangladesh", citing the 2015 murder of Tavella Cesare and the July 2016 Dhaka attack as evidence of an ISIL presence in Bangladesh.

The Bangladeshi government is enlisting international organizations and local community leaders to help alter local acceptance of Islamic extremist actions in the country. Prime Minister Sheikh Hasina has asked other countries with ISIL activity in diaspora communities, such as the United Kingdom, to take preventive action against individuals who are radicalising communities and transplanting ideology (and militancy) back to Bangladesh; the diaspora community in England has proven ties to ISIL and JMB.

To bolster governmental strength in Bangladesh, the country have cooperated with the United States to fortify their borders against bi-directional militant migration. The Bangladesh Coast Guard, Navy's Special Warfare and Diving Salvage unit and the army's 1st Para-Commando Battalion were trained by the U.S. Special Operations Command Pacific in 2015.

Bangladesh's government has committed itself to the anti-terrorist movement, participating in the South Asian Association for Regional Cooperation counter-terrorist protocols and adopting the stance and measures promoted by the UN Global Counter-Terrorism Strategy. They are part of the Asia/Pacific Group on Money Laundering, which aims to thwart financing of militants and terrorist organizations. Although the Antiterrorism Act of 2009 does not explicitly outlaw recruitment and migration (fundamental to the spread of terrorism), legal action has been taken against individuals suspected of facilitating recruitment in Bangladesh and abroad.

At January 7th 2023, Indian police in West Bengal has arrested 2 men who was suspected to be part of ISIL at Howrah's Tikiapara area in Kolkata, after they was involved in spreading tentacles of the group. One of them admitted to having connections with ISIL functionaries in Pakistan and West Asia.

== See also ==
- Islamic State – Hind Province
- Islamic State – Pakistan Province
- Islamic State insurgency in Tunisia
- Terrorism in Pakistan
- Terrorism in India
- Insurgency in Jammu and Kashmir
- Al-Qaeda in the Indian Subcontinent
- Attacks by Islamic extremists in Bangladesh
