= Holey Artisan Bakery =

Bakery headquartered in Dhaka, Bangladesh

Coordinates: 23.7960°N 90.4134°E

- Baked goods of Holey Artisan Bakery at one of its locations in Bangkok
- Industry: Bakery
- Founded: 2015; 11 years ago
- Headquarters: Dhaka, Bangladesh
- Number of locations: 5
- Area served: Bangladesh and Thailand
- Products: Cakes and Bread
- Owners: Sadat Mehdi & Nasirul Alam
- Website: holeybakery.com (Bangladesh) holeybakery.cafe (Thailand)

Holey Artisan Bakery is a bakery headquartered in Bangladesh with most of its locations in Bangkok, Thailand. It was described in The New York Times "as among the most beloved restaurants in Dhaka". It is a sister company of Izumi.

== History ==
A location of Holey Artisan Bakery in Sathon, Bangkok

Holey Artisan Bakery was founded by Nasirul Alam Porag in 2014, after returning from the US. The project came as he and his partner were not able to find a proper artisanal bakery in Dhaka. The restaurant was originally located on Road 79 Gulshan-2 near the diplomatic quarters of Dhaka. Its clientele consisted of locals and the expat community in Dhaka.

The bakery was attacked by terrorists on 1 July 2016. In the attack, 29 people were killed, including 20 hostages (17 foreigners and 3 locals), two police officers, five gunmen, and two bakery staff. Porag said in a 2026 interview; for the first time in detail about his experience during the attack, that the event took place three weeks after he opened the first outlet in Bangkok, Thailand. He followed the event unfold from security cameras and was fed live detailed updates from the scene. According to him his biggest concerns were his staffs and guests.

The restaurant was closed after the attack, before reopening in the ‘Rangs Arcade’ building at Gulshan, described as more secure by the restaurant on 10 January 2017. The original restaurant has since been renamed as Oro Bakery in Dhaka.

The bakery owners plan to turn the former building that housed the restaurant into a residence for themselves.

In September 2016, Holey Artisan opened their first overseas branch in Bangkok, Thailand shortly before reopening in Dhaka. There are currently four branches in Bangkok. The locations in Thailand has retained the 'Holey Artisan' name unlike the restaurant in Dhaka. In an interview in 2026, its owner mentioned that the local Bangladeshi authority did not permit the use of the name Holey, so the name Oro was used.
