= Counter Terrorism and Transnational Crime =

Detective branch of Dhaka metropolitan police

Counter Terrorism and Transnational Crime কাউন্টার টেরোরিজম অ্যান্ড ট্রান্সন্যাশনাল ক্রাইম
- Insignia of CTTC

Agency overview
- Formed: February 16, 2005; 21 years ago
- Employees: 600

Jurisdictional structure
- Operations jurisdiction: Bangladesh
- General nature: Civilian police

Operational structure
- Headquarters: 36 Minto Road, Ramna 1217, Dhaka
- Agency executive: Mia Masud Karim, Additional Commissioner
- Parent agency: Dhaka Metropolitan Police
- Child agency: SWAT

Website
- cttcdmp.gov.bd

Counter Terrorism and Transnational Crime (Bengali: কাউন্টার টেরোরিজম অ্যান্ড ট্রান্সন্যাশনাল ক্রাইম, abbreviated as CTTC) was a specialized branch of the Bangladesh Police formed to tackle terrorism and transnational crime. Deputy Inspector General Md. Asaduzzaman bpm (bar) is the chief of the branch. The unit was renamed to Special Response Unit.

== History ==
Bangladesh Police recommended the formation of a special unit, called Police Bureau of Counter-Terrorism, in August 2011 to the Home Ministry. In September 2013, the Home Ministry sent it to the Ministry of Public Administration. A rise in terror attacks in 2015 increased demand for the unit. On 16 February 2016 Counter Terrorism and Transnational Crime Unit of Dhaka Metropolitan Police was formed with 600 personnel. In March 2017 it carried out a raid in Sitakunda, Chittagong leading to the death of two militants. It provided support to Operation Twilight by 1st Para-Commando Battalion of Bangladesh Army on 25 March 2017.

The unit was renamed to Special Response Unit in September 2026. The original unit would be called SRU DMP while separate units will be established in Metropolitan Police units across the county.

== Organisation ==
CTTC has seven divisions.

== Special Action Group ==
- SWAT (Bangladesh)

The SWAT (Special Weapons And Tactics) is another elite tactical unit of the Dhaka Metropolitan Police which was established on 28 February 2009. SWAT is operated under the Special Action Group of Counter Terrorism and Transnational Crime of Dhaka Metropolitan Police.

- K9
- Bomb Disposal Unit

== CT-Cyber Crime Investigation ==
The CT-Cyber Crime Investigation, former Cyber Security & Crime Division, popularly known as the Cyber Crime Unit, is a branch of Bangladesh Police which is operated under the Counter Terrorism and Transnational Crime of Dhaka Metropolitan Police. The main function of this division is to prevent, patrol, detect and investigate cyber-terrorism and cyber-crime in Dhaka.

== Controversy ==
Following the political transition on August 5, 2024, the interim government of Bangladesh accused the organization's former chief, Md. Asaduzzaman, of orchestrating "militant dramas" against innocent individuals, including the 2016 killings of seven people in Gazipur, the arrest of two female students from Manarat International University, and the murder of former Major Zahidul, among other charges. Consequently, on August 21, 2024, the interim government of Bangladesh sent him into compulsory retirement in the public interest.

== See also ==
- Islamic Extremism
- Islamic extremism in Bangladesh
- Islamic State of Bengal Province
