= Editors' Council =

National organization of newspaper editors in Bangladesh

- Editors Gulid, Bangladesh
- Formation: 2013
- Headquarters: Dhaka, Bangladesh
- Region served: Bangladesh
- Official language: Bengali

Editors' Council (Bengali: সম্পাদক পরিষদ) is a national organization of newspaper editors in Bangladesh that campaigns for freedom of speech and freedom of the press. On November 13, 2025 Nurul Kabir of New Age and Dewan Hanif Mahmud, editor of Bonik Barta are the president and general secretary of the council for a two-year term.

== History ==
Editors' Council was established in 2013. The founding members were AMM Bahauddin (Daily Inqilab), Alamgir Mohiuddin (Daily Naya Diganta), Anwar Hossain Manju (The Daily Ittefaq), A. H. M. Moazzem Hossain (The Financial Express), Imdadul Haq Milon (Kaler Kantho), Khondoker Muniruzzaman (The Sangbad), Mahbubul Alam (The Independent), Mostafa Kamal Majumder (The New Nation), MA Malek (The Azadi), Mozammel Haque (Korotoa), Matiur Rahman (Prothom Alo), Naem Nizam (Bangladesh Pratidin), Shyamal Dutta (Bhorer Kagoj), and Taslim Uddin Chowdhury (Dainik Purbokone). Golam Sarwar (Samakal) was elected the first president, Mahfuz Anam (The Daily Star) was elected general secretary, and Matiur Rahman Chowdhury (Manab Zamin) the treasurer.

The council has campaigned against section 32 of the Digital Security Act, which they described as an attack on freedom of speech. The council also protested the filing of case under the Digital Security Act against Manab Zamin and its Editor-in-Chief Matiur Rahman Chowdhury by Saifuzzaman Shikhor, Member of Parliament from Magura-1.

Mahfuz Anam of The Daily Star and Naem Nizam of Bangladesh Pratidin were elected the president and general secretary of the council in September 2019. But Naem Nizam had resigned from his post in protest against what he termed the council chief Mahfuz Anam's "unethical" activities. Then Dewan Hanif Mahmud, editor of Bonik Barta and deputy general secretary of the organisation, becomes acting general secretary of the council.

In March 2022, Anam and Mahmud was again appointed as the president and the general secretary of Editors' Council.

== Executive body ==
President	Nurul Kabir, Editor, New Age
Vice-president	Tasmima Hossain, editor, The Daily Ittefaq
General Secretary	Dewan Hanif Mahmud, editor, Bonik Barta
Joint General Secretary	Rusho Mahmud, editor, Suprobhat Bangladesh
Executive Members	Mahfuz Anam, editor and publisher, The Daily Star
Executive Members	Matiur Rahman Chowdhury, editor, Manabzamin
Executive Members	Matiur Rahman, editor, Prothom Alo
Executive Members	Mozammel Haque, editor, The Daily Karatoa
Executive Members	AMM Bahauddin, editor, The Daily Inqilab
