= Ahmed Akbar Sobhan =

Bangladeshi businessman and chairman of Bashundhara Group

- আহমেদ আকবর সোবহান
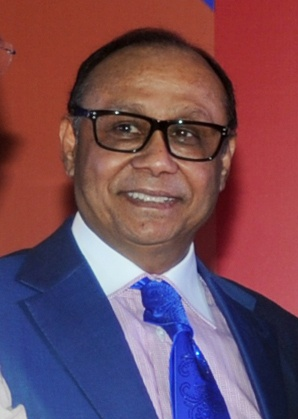
- Ahmed Akbar Sobhan in October 2018
- Born: 15 February 1952 (age 74); Dhaka, East Bengal, East Pakistan
- Education: University of Dhaka
- Occupation: Chairman of Bashundhara Group
- Years active: 1978–present
- Spouse: Afroza Begum
- Children: Sayem; Shafiat; Sadat; Safwan
- Website: www.ahmedakbarsobhan.net

Ahmed Akbar Sobhan (আহমেদ আকবর সোবহান; born 15 February 1952) is a Bangladeshi business magnate. He is the founder of Bashundhara Group, which operates in the real estate, cement manufacturing, paper, and media sectors.

== Career ==
In 1987, Sobhan started the East West Property Development (Pvt) Ltd., now known as Bashundhara Housing and is part of Bashundhara Group. He also owns a number of media organizations through East West Media Group.

Sobhan is the president of the Bangladesh Land Developers Association. He had served a term as the president of Bangladesh Cement Manufacturers Association.

In 2006, Sobhan sued Jugantor over two reports the newspaper had published.

On 19 April 2009, Sobhan signed a deal with Bangladesh Football Federation to provide 45 million taka to the federation in a sponsorship deal to support district level football. On 23 April 2009, he offered to build two stadiums for Bangladesh Football Federation. RAJUK was critical of the offer as the promised site was situated on protected wetlands.

On 4 March 2010, Sobhan filed a defamation suit against Prothom Alo over two reports the newspaper had published the previous year.

In June 2010, Sobhan had a confrontational meeting with Abdul Mannan Khan, state minister of housing and public works, on Detailed Area Plan by RAJUK between the minister and land developers. Following the meeting RAJUK order the demolition of a number of structures owned by Bashundhara group next week.

On 26 February 2014, Natore District correspondent of Jugantor, owned by Jamuna Group, Mahfuz Alam Moony, sued Sobhan, Imdadul Haq Milon, and Naem Nizam over reports published in newspapers owned by Bashundhara Group. According to the suit the news reports were against Moony and the distillery of Jamuna group.

Sobhan personally intervened to stop Star Cineplex from leaving Bashundhara City during the COVID-19 pandemic in Bangladesh as the cineplex saw its earnings decline and faced difficulties paying rent. In 2020, he oversaw the launch of a bitumen plant by Bashundhara Oil and Gas Company, a subsidiary of Bashundhara Group.

== Philanthropy ==
=== Covid-19 pandemic ===
In March 2020, Sobhan proposed the conversion of four Bashundhara Group convention centres into a 5000-bed hospital for the treatment of COVID-19 patients to Bangladeshi Prime Minister Sheikh Hasina. On May 17, 2020, the Bashundhara COVID-19 Isolation Hospital was formally inaugurated by Health and Family Welfare Minister Zahid Maleque at an event held at International Convention City Bashundhara (ICCB).

Sobhan donated 100 million taka to the Prime Minister's office to help combat the virus outbreak in the country in April 2020.

=== Bashundhara Eye Hospital ===
In December 2013, construction of the Bashundhara Eye Hospital and Research Institute - an establishment built specifically to provide high-quality eye-care to the impoverished - was completed. It was inaugurated by Sobhan on December 5, 2014. As of March 2021, the hospital has served 10,500 patients free of cost and organized various eye care camps throughout the country. Furthermore, the institute runs a Shariah-based Zakat fund for Muslims alongside other religious funds.

== Legal history ==
In October 2007, Ahmed Akbar Sobhan, his wife Afroza Begum, and their 4 sons were sentenced to 8 years of imprisonment on charges of tax evasion. During the 2006–08 Bangladeshi political crisis, Sobhan handed over the power of attorney for Bashundhara Group to a nine-member committee while he was absconding in London with his family. During the tenure of this committee, the Bashundhara Group paid more than Tk. 220 crore to the government as compensation for evading earlier taxes. This move was taken despite Sobhan's opposition and he retaliated by withdrawing the power of attorney for 4 officials of the nine-member committee. Another charge was that Sobhan and his family amassed wealth worth about Tk. 107 crore beyond their known sources of income and amassed Tk. 606.66 crore illegally while also concealing information about Tk. 14.17 crore. The charge sheet for the case mentioned that around Tk. 500 crore was whitened by the family. In December 2012, a case was filed against Sobhan, his son Sanvir, and 2 company officials for misappropriating nearly Tk. 40 crore from a businessman. The plaintiff (the chairman of a spinning mill) filed the case claiming that he was owed 3 plots from the East West Property Development Ltd. Sobhan and his son were acquitted in the case of three plots by Judge Erfan Ullah on 11 August 2014.

On 15 May 2010, assistant land officer of Shafipur union, Md Mukhlesur Rahman Khan, filled two cases against Sobhan and five others. In the cases he alleged that they accused were grabbing of government land, intimidating of government officials, and illegally lifting soil while working on Mouchak City Project of Bashundhara Group.

A Dhaka court ordered the freezing of shares and bank accounts belonging to Bashundhara Group Chairman Ahmed Akbar Sobhan and his family members, following a petition by the Anti-Corruption Commission (ACC). The order covered shares valued at approximately Tk 14.59 billion across 22 publicly listed companies, along with Tk 198 million and USD 10,538 remaining in 70 bank accounts. These accounts registered in the names of Sobhan, his four sons (Sayem, Sadat, Sanvir, and Safwan Sobhan), and their spouses had previously received deposits totaling Tk 20.75 billion and USD 192,034, most of which had been withdrawn. The ACC launched the investigation amid allegations of illicit wealth accumulation and possible money laundering both within Bangladesh and abroad. The freeze was enacted under the provisions of the Money Laundering Prevention Act, 2012.

On 17 August 2025, the Anti-Corruption Commission (ACC) of Bangladesh reported that Ahmed Akbar Sobhan and his wife Afroza Begum had illegally amassed moveable and immoveable wealth worth Tk 700 crore beyond their known sources of income. The ACC stated that the couple also laundered $250,000 to Saint Kitts and Nevis, where they obtained citizenship, and transferred large sums through company accounts in Switzerland's Lugano, the British Virgin Islands, and the Isle of Man. According to the inquiry, Sobhan's assets amounted to Tk 252 crore (Tk 67.5 crore immoveable and Tk 184 crore moveable), while Afroza held Tk 453 crore (Tk 117 crore immoveable and Tk 335 crore moveable). The ACC said the couple did not obtain Bangladesh Bank approval for these transfers, confirming evidence of money laundering.

On 18 August 2025, a Dhaka court issued arrest warrants for Bashundhara Group Chairman Ahmed Akbar Sobhan, Managing Director Sayem Sobhan Anvir, and two media executives Naem Nizam (East West Media Group director) and Shahed Muhammad Ali (former editor of Kaler Kantho) in a cheque dishonor case brought by former journalist Rahenur Islam, who alleged that two service benefit cheques worth Tk 196,078 were returned due to insufficient funds

On 1 January 2026, a Dhaka court ordered the attachment of 385 satak of land, including a multi-storey building under the Gulshan Revenue Circle, owned by Afroza Begum, wife of Ahmed Akbar Sobhan. The order was issued by Dhaka Metropolitan Senior Special Judge’s Court following a petition filed by the Anti-Corruption Commission (ACC). According to the application, allegations of money laundering have been brought against Sobhan and entities associated with his interests, and an investigation team has been formed. The ACC informed the court that preliminary findings suggested the acquisition of substantial illegal assets in Dhaka and other locations in Bangladesh, as well as abroad, in his own name and in the names of family members. The application further stated that Afroza Begum had attempted to transfer her immovable properties and that such transfers could obstruct potential legal proceedings, including the filing of charges and confiscation of assets, prompting the court to order the attachment.

On 18 February 2026, the Anti-Corruption Commission (ACC) announced that it would file a case against Sobhan and 25 others over allegations of embezzling Tk 5.75 billion from loans obtained from National Bank Limited. According to the ACC, the accused, including Sobhan’s son Shafiat Sobhan allegedly colluded to approve loans in violation of banking regulations without sufficient collateral or proper assessment of repayment capacity. The commission stated that loans totalling Tk 13.25 billion had been approved, including Tk 5.75 billion in funded loans that remain unpaid, and alleged that a significant portion of the funds was transferred among entities within the Bashundhara Group and used for purposes inconsistent with the loan conditions, constituting an attempt to conceal the alleged misuse through layered transactions.
