= Bashundhara Group =

Bangladeshi industrial conglomerate

- Native name: বসুন্ধরা গ্রুপ
- Type: Private
- Industry: Real Estate, Manufacturing
- Founded: 1987; 39 years ago
- Founder: Ahmed Akbar Sobhan
- Headquarters: Pushpanjali, Bashundhara Convention Center Road, Bangladesh
- Key people: Ahmed Akbar Sobhan (Chairman)
- Products: Cement, tissue, media, LPG, Paper, Real estate, Shopping mall, Steel, Food & beverage, Shipping, Sports
- Owner: Ahmed Akbar Sobhan & family
- Number of employees: 700,000+
- Website: bashundharagroup.com

Bashundhara Group LTD (Bengali: বসুন্ধরা গ্রুপ) is a Bangladeshi conglomerate based in Dhaka. It was incorporated in 1987 as a real estate company under the name East West Property Development Ltd (EWPD). It presently owns more than 50 major concerns throughout Bangladesh. The company's import-export turnover was $1.12 billion or BDT 111.38 billion in the 2022-23 fiscal year. In the 2018 fiscal year, the company's real estate holdings amounted to BDT 50,000 crores, or $4.6 billion.

== History ==
Bashundhara Group, founded by Ahmed Akbar Sobhan, began in 1987 as a real estate venture. After its first project, Bashundhara invested in new fields, including manufacturing, industry and trading. More enterprises were established in the early 1990s; these included cement, paper, pulp, tissue paper and steel production, as well as LP Gas bottling and distribution. Bashundhara received permission from the Bangladesh Economic Zones Authority to set up two specialized economic zones in Keraniganj, Dhaka, Bangladesh.

In 2013, Bashundhara invested $181 million in the food sector, producing flour, wheat, red meat, etc.

In 2020, Bashundhara invested $143.7 million to build the largest bitumen plant in Bangladesh. In the same year, Bashundhara became involved in the coal trading market, with a notable example of supply 8 million tonnes of coal to the Rampal coal-fired power plant. In 2020, the group announced it would invest Tk 4,350 crore to set up three new factories at Bangabandhu Sheikh Mujib Shilpa Nagar creating nearly 3,900 jobs.

In 2021, Bashundhara invested $909 million to create an oil refinery on 220 acres of land in the Sitakunda upazila of the country's port city of Chattogram.

In 2022, Bashundhara invested $546 million into creating Bangladesh's first gold refinery on 470 acres of land near the Dhaka-Purbachal highway In the same year, Bashundhara Multi-Steel Industries invested $395 million for phase-1 of a steel manufacturing plant at Bashundhara Industrial Economic Zone at Bangabandhu Shilpa Nagar in Chattogram. The phase-2 investment of $727 million will be initiated in 2025, bringing the company's annual steel production to 3 million tonnes. Later, in 2022, ABG Limited, a concern of Bashundhara group signed an agreement with the Chittagong Stock Exchange to acquire 25% of its shares for BDT 240 crore in line with the country's demutualisation act.

In 2023, Bashundhara Telecommunications Limited submitted a proposal to the Post and Telecommunications division of the country to become a strategic investor of the struggling state owned carrier TeleTalk.

In January 2024, Bashundhara Paper Mills and Bashundhara Multi Paper Industries released their first sustainability report in accordance with UN Sustainable Development Goals. In 2023–24, Bashundhara Paper Mills increased its CSR spending by 21 percent.

In February 2025, Bashundhara Paper Mills took part in the 6th Papertech Expo at the International Convention City Bashundhara in Dhaka.

== Enterprises ==
Bashundhara Group operates over 50 companies. Notable companies include:

- East West Media Group
- Bashundhara Kings
- Rangpur Riders
- Kebab Turki Baba Rafi (Bangladesh)
- Bumbellbee Limited - cable tv provider

=== East West Media Group ===
East West Media Group logo

East West Media Group PLC is a media conglomerate located in Bashundhara Residential Area, Dhaka, Bangladesh. It is a subsidiary of Bashundhara Group. Mostafa Kamal Mohiuddin is the chairman of the Media Group. Novelist and former editor of Kaler Kantho Imdadul Haq Milan is the brand ambassador of the Media Group. Naem Nizam is Director of the group.

The company was established in 2009. In 2016, the company was awarded by the National Board of Revenue for being a high tax payer. On 18 August 2024, the offices of East West Media was vandalized.

Its subsidiaries are:

- Daily Sun
- Bangladesh Pratidin A Bangla Language newspaper and the largest circulated Newspaper in Bangladesh.
- Kaler Kantho
- Banglanews24.com – Online news portal.
- News24 – HD satellite news channel.
- T Sports- Sports channel.
- Radio Capital An FM radio Station based in Dhaka.

== Bashundhara City ==
Bashundhara City (Bengali: বসুন্ধরা সিটি) is a shopping mall in Dhaka. Construction began in 1998; Mohammad Foyes Ullah and Mustapha Khalid Palash of Vistara designed the building. Opened to the public on 6 August 2004, the mall is located at Panthapath, near Karwan Bazar, in Dhaka city and cost over $100 million to complete. Bashundhara City is 21 stories tall, of which 8 are used for the mall, which houses fashion houses and jewelry shops, as well as around 100 food outlets.

The mall has experienced two fires. The first fire occurred on March 13, 2009, resulting in the deaths of 7 people and injuries to 20 others. The second incident, which took place in 2016, did not result in any casualties.

== Bashundhara Residential Area ==
Bashundhara Residential Area, or simply "Bashundhara", (Bengali: বসুন্ধরা আবাসিক এলাকা) is a residential and semi-business neighbourhood in Dhaka, Bangladesh. Described as a "city inside a city," the area is the largest private real estate project in Greater Dhaka. It is owned and operated by East West Property Development Pvt. Ltd., a subsidiary of Bashundhara Group.

== Media ventures ==
In 2009, the group launched East West Media Group Ltd., which now operates several major media outlets in Bangladesh. These include two television channels, one FM radio station, an online newspaper, and three print media publications.

The Bengali-language national daily newspapers owned by East West Media Group are Kaler Kantho and Bangladesh Pratidin. The group also publishes the English-language newspaper Daily Sun. Additionally, the online news portal banglanews24.com provides content in both Bengali and English.

The television channels owned by the group include News24 and T-Sports, while Radio Capital is its FM radio station.

== Legal issues ==
In October 2007, Ahmed Akbar Sobhan, his wife Afroza Begum, and their four sons were sentenced to eight years in prison on charges of tax evasion. During the 2006–08 political crisis in Bangladesh, while in London with his family, Sobhan handed over the power of attorney for Bashundhara Group to a nine-member committee. Under this committee's management, the company paid over Tk 220 crore to the government as compensation for previously evaded taxes. This decision was made against Sobhan's wishes, prompting him to later revoke the power of attorney for four members of the committee.

Sobhan and his family also faced allegations of amassing approximately Tk 107 crore beyond their known sources of income, illegally acquiring Tk 606.66 crore, and concealing wealth worth Tk 14.17 crore. The charge sheet noted that around Tk 500 crore was regularized under the government's money whitening scheme.

In 2025, A Dhaka court ordered the freezing of shares and bank accounelonging to Bashundhara Group Chairman Ahmed Akbar Sobhan and his family members, following a petition by the Anti-Corruption Commission (ACC). The court directive froze shares worth around Tk 14.59 billion across 22 listed companies, as well as Tk 198 million and US$10,538 that remained in 70 bank accounts. These accounts, held under the names of Sobhan, his four sons—Sayem, Sadat, Sanvir, and Safwan Sobhan—and their wives, had previously received total deposits of Tk 20.75 billion and US$192,034, which were largely withdrawn. The ACC was investigating allegations of wealth accumulation beyond known sources and suspected money laundering, both domestically and abroad. The freezing order was issued under the Money Laundering Prevention Act, 2012.

On 16 May 2025, a Chattogram court sent a Bashundhara Group official, Mohammad Foyez, to jail in a case involving an alleged attempt to evade over Tk 50 crore in port storage charges by submitting a forged letter from the Ministry of Shipping. According to the case statement, 109 containers (equivalent to 214 TEUs) imported by Bashundhara Multi Steel Company Limited were awaiting release at Chattogram Port, and Foyez, along with unidentified accomplices, tried to fraudulently secure a 60% waiver on charges payable to the Chattogram Port Authority (CPA). He allegedly used a mobile number registered to Enamul Karim, Director (Transport), and sent the fake letter with a forged signature of ministry official Nazrul Islam Azad. The Ministry later confirmed that no such letter had been issued. The court ordered police to produce Foyez again on 19 June 2025.

On 16 June 2025, Bangladesh's Anti-Corruption Commission (ACC) sent a formal letter to the United Kingdom's National Crime Agency (NCA) requesting the seizure of assets belonging to Bashundhara Group's Vice Chairman Shafiat Sobhan (Sanvir) and Co-chairman Sadat Sobhan.

On 19 June 2025, a Sylhet court issued arrest warrants against Bashundhara Group Chairman Ahmed Akbar Sobhan, Managing Director Sayem Sobhan Anvir, and four others in a cheque fraud case. The order was passed by Judge Mohammad Harun-or-Rashid of the Sylhet Additional Chief Metropolitan Magistrate Court after the accused failed to appear in court despite earlier summons. The case was filed by Ahmed Noor, former Sylhet Bureau Chief of Kaler Kantho, a newspaper under Bashundhara Group's East West Media Group. The other accused include Kaler Kantho publisher Moynal Hossain Chowdhury, current editor Hasan Hafiz, former editor and cheque signatory Shahed Muhammad Ali, and Bangladesh Pratidin’s former editor Naem Nizam. The case alleges that although Ahmed Noor worked at the newspaper from its inception until September 2021, he was not paid his full service benefits as per the wage board. Eventually, the management issued ten postdated cheques in January as part of the agreed settlement. Of these, only two were honored, while eight cheques bounced, totaling Tk 601,824.

On 17 August 2025, the Anti-Corruption Commission (ACC) of Bangladesh reported that Bashundhara Group chairman Ahmed Akbar Sobhan and his wife Afroza Begum had amassed Tk 700 crore in moveable and immoveable assets beyond known sources of income and laundered $250,000 to Saint Kitts and Nevis, where they hold citizenship, as well as transferring large sums through company accounts in Lugano in Switzerland, the British Virgin Islands, and the Isle of Man. The ACC stated that Sobhan possessed Tk 252 crore in assets (Tk 67.5 crore immoveable and Tk 184 crore moveable), while Afroza held Tk 453 crore (Tk 117 crore immoveable and Tk 335 crore moveable), and that none of the transfers had approval from Bangladesh Bank, confirming evidence of money laundering.

== See also ==
- List of companies of Bangladesh
- Bashundhara Kings
- Bashundhara Kings Women

== Sources ==
- Bashundhara Group Profile Archived 22 February 2012 at the Wayback Machine Bashundhara Group Profile
- Bashundhara Group - Business Profile - BashundharaGroup | PRLog Bashundhara Group PR
- Bashundhara group overview Bashundhara Group Overview Slide
- সমাজ-রাষ্ট্রকে প্রযুক্তিসমৃদ্ধ করতে চায় টগি সার্ভিসেস: সাফওয়ান সোবহান
