= List of journalists killed in Bangladesh =

List of journalists killed in Bangladesh is about journalists killed in Bangladesh, while reporting or on account of their journalism.

According to the Committee to Protect Journalists, the organization has confirmed that 13 journalists have been killed in Bangladesh since 1992.

== Journalist killed since 1992 ==
Name	Date of death	Sex	Media outlet	Country	Place of death	Source/Reference for circumstance
Mohammad Quamruzzaman	19 February 1996	m	Neel Sagar	Bangladesh	Nilphamari District	CPJ
Saiful Alam Mukul	30 August 1998	m	Daily Runner	Bangladesh	Jessore District	CPJ
Mir Illias Hossain	15 January 2000	m	Dainik Bir Darpan	Bangladesh	Jhenaidah	CPJ
Shamsur Rahman (age 43)	16 July 2000	m	Janakantha	Bangladesh	Jessore District	CPJ
Nahar Ali	21 April 2001	m	Anirban	Bangladesh	Khulna	CPJ
Harunur Rashid (journalist)	2 March 2002	m	Dainik Purbanchal	Bangladesh	Khulna	CPJ
Shukur Hossain	5 July 2002	m	Anirban	Bangladesh	Ula, Bangladesh	CPJ
Syed Farroque Ahmed	3 August 2002	m	Pubali Barta	Bangladesh	Sreemangal Upazila	IFEX
Manik Chandra Saha	15 January 2004	m	New Age & BBC World Service	Bangladesh	Khulna	CPJ, UNESCO
Humayun Kabir Balu (age 58)	27 June 2004	m	Janmabhumi	Bangladesh	Khulna	CPJ
Kamal Hossain (age 32)	22 August 2004	m	Ajker Kagoj and Daily Bir Chattagram Mancha	Bangladesh	Manikchhari Upazila	CPJ
Dipankar Chakrabarty	2 October 2004	m	Durjoy Bangla	Bangladesh	Sherpur	UNESCO
Shahid Anwar (journalist)	24 October 2004	m	Daily Asian Express	Bangladesh	Dhaka	UNESCO
Sheikh Belaluddin Ahmed	11 February 2005	m	Daily Sangram	Bangladesh	Khulna	CPJ
Golam Mahfuz	31 May 2005	m	Comilla Muktakantha	Bangladesh	Comilla	UNESCO
Gautam Das	17 November 2005	m	Samakal	Bangladesh	Faridpur	CPJ
Bellal Hossain Dafadar	14 September 2006	m	Janabani	Bangladesh	Kalaroa Upazila	UNESCO
Golam Mustofa Sarowar	11 February 2012	m	Maasranga TV	Bangladesh	Dhaka	UNESCO
Meherun Runi	11 February 2012	f	ATN Bangla TV	Bangladesh	Dhaka	UNESCO
Jamal Uddin	15 June 2012	m	Gramer Kagoj	Bangladesh	Kashipur	CPJ
Talhad Ahmed Kabid	23 October 2012	m	Dainik Narsingdi Bani	Bangladesh	Narsingdi	RSF
Sadrul Alam Nipul	21 May 2014	m	Dainik Mathabhanga	Bangladesh	Chuadanga	CPJ
Julhas Uddin	3 September 2020	m	Bijoy TV	Bangladesh	Dhaka	[]
Iliyas Hossain	11 October 2020	m	Dainik Bijoy	Bangladesh	Narayanganj	CPJ
Borhan Uddin Muzakkir	19 February 2021	m	Bartabazar.com	Bangladesh	Companiganj	
Ashiqul Islam	9 January 2023	m	Brahmanbaria Patrika	Bangladesh	Brahmanbaria	IFJ
Golam Rabbani Nadim	15 June 2023	m	Banglanews24.com	Bangladesh	Jamalpur District	IFJ
Mehedi Hasan Tuhin	18 July 2024	m	Dhaka Times	Bangladesh	Dhaka	
Shakil Hossain	19 July 2024	m	Bhorer Awaj	Bangladesh	Sylhet	
Abu Taher Md. Turab	19 July 2024	m	Daily Naya Diganta	Bangladesh	Sylhet	
Tahir Zaman Priyo	2 August 2024	m	Freelance Journalist	Bangladesh	Dhaka	
Pradeep Kumar Bhowmik	5 August 2024	m	Daily Khabarpatra	Bangladesh	Sirajganj	
Md Asaduzzaman Tuhin	07 August 2025	m	Daily Protidiner Kagoj	Bangladesh	Gazipur	

== Journalists killed during 1971 ==
Name	Date of death	Sex	Media outlet	Country	Place of death	Source/Reference for circumstance
Serajuddin Hossain (or Seraj Uddin Hossain)	10 December 1971	m	Daily Ittefaq	Bangladesh	Unknown place	
Selina Parvin (or Selina Parveen)	14 December 1971	f	Shilalipi	Bangladesh	Rayerbazar Boddhobhumy	
Shahidullah Kaiser	14 December 1971	m	The Sangbad	Bangladesh	Unknown place	

== See also ==
- Political repression of cyber-dissidents
