= Harris Chowdhury =

Bangladeshi businessman and politician (1952–2021)

Md Abul Harris Chowdhury
- মোঃ আবুল হারিছ চৌধুরী
- Born: Md Abul Harris Chowdhury; 1 November 1952
- Died: 3 September 2021 (aged 68); Dhaka, Bangladesh
- Occupation: Politician
- Political party: Bangladesh Nationalist Party

Abul Harris Chowdhury (1 November 1952 – 3 September 2021) was a Bangladeshi politician who served as the Political Secretary of Prime Minister Begum Khaleda Zia. He was the Joint Secretary General of Bangladesh Nationalist Party. Chowdhury was sentenced to 65 years in total and a life term in prison in absentia for allegedly committing multiple crimes. His party alleges the charges were falsely given, along with those against Khaleda Zia's son Tarique Rahman, and many other senior party members.

== Career ==
Chowdhury was nominated to contest in the National Parliamentary Elections since 1977. He was Founding General Secretary and Divisional Organizing Secretary of Sylhet District branch of BNP and Joint Secretary General of BNP's Central Committee. President Ziaur Rahman gave him the responsibility of organizing the youth, he was the Founding Vice President of BNP's youth wing, Bangladesh Jatiotabadi Jubo Dal. He served as Prime Minister Begum Khaleda Zia's political secretary. He worked closely and for a long time with two state and government heads i.e. President Ziaur Rahman and Prime Minister Begum Khaleda Zia. He served as the political secretary of the then Prime Minister Khaleda Zia from 2001 to 2006.

=== Charges and convictions ===
Chowdhury had been a fugitive since the military-backed caretaker government took power on 11 January 2007. Later that year, Chowdhury was charged by the caretaker government of acquiring his wealth through illegal methods. In October, he was sentenced to three years in jail by a special anti-corruption tribunal for illegally possessing foreign currency. In November, a Dhaka court sentenced him to 59 years in jail and fined him Tk 21 lakh on five counts of charges, including abuse of power and government-transport mishandling.

He was charged with involvement in the murder of former finance minister, Shah A M S Kibria, in 2005. In November 2014, a supplementary charge-sheet was submitted accusing 35 people including Chowdhury. Chowdhury was also charged with involvement in the Zia Charitable Trust corruption case.

Chowdhury was charged with involvement in the August 2004 Dhaka grenade attack. In December 2014, an arrest warrant was issued against him. In February 2016, his properties were confiscated by the directives of Bangladesh High Court. In October 2018, a special court found Chowdhury and 37 others guilty in the grenade attack case. He was sentenced to life term in prison and fined Tk 50,000. Interpol Red Notice had been served on him in November 2015. According to CID and police headquarters sources, as of October 2018, Chowdhury was moving through Malaysia, London, Singapore, the United States and India.

Chowdhury's family also refers to the allegations and charges against him along with the convictions he received to be simply political and part of the political culture of the country An investigative report by veteran journalist Matiur Rahman Chowdhury published in Manab Zamin following Chowdhury's death confirms that he had in fact never fled the country.

== Personal life and death ==
Chowdhury was married to Josne Ara Chowdhury. They have a son, Nayem Shafi Chowdhury, and a daughter, Samira Tanzin Chowdhury. He has a younger brother, Ashiq Chowdhury, Selim Chowdhury, Faruk Chowdhury and an elder sister, Akhlasun Nahar.

On 12 January 2022, Chowdhury's brother announced in a Facebook post that Chowdhury had died from COVID-19 complications in London, United Kingdom, in September 2021, and was buried at the same location. While his brother’s announcement was widely reported, other controversial sources often criticised for spreading disinformation reported that Chowdhury had not died. Nonetheless, drawing a conclusion to all politically motivated controversies surrounding the matter, His daughter, Samira Tanzin Chowdhury, revealed to the media and confirmed particularly in an investigative report by journalist Matiur Rahman Chowdhury the Editor in Chief of the Manab Zamin that Harris Chowdhury in fact died in Evercare Hospital, Dhaka never having fled the country.

Chowdhury had died on 3 September 2021 and was buried under the fake name Professor Mahmudur Rahman at Savar inside the compound of Jamia Khatamunnabiyyin Madrasa. The body was exhumed and DNA test confirmed it was Chowdhury. He was then reburied at the Shafiqul Haque Chowdhury Memorial Orphanage with state honors. He had established the orphanage and named it after his father at Kanaighat.
