= Banglanews24.com =

Online newspaper published in Dhaka, Bangladesh

- Type: Online newspaper
- Format: Mobile and web
- Owner: East West Media Group
- Publisher: Bashundhara Group
- Editor: Touhidul Islam Mintu
- Founded: 1 July 2010
- Language: Bengali and English
- Headquarters: ABG Tower, Plot - 440, 441 & 442, Road - 18, Block A, Bashundhara R/A, Dhaka - 1229, Bangladesh
- City: Dhaka
- Country: Bangladesh
- Sister newspapers: News24tv; Bangladesh Pratidin; Daily Sun; Radio Capital; Kaler Kantho
- Website: banglanews24.com

Banglanews24.com is an English-Bengali online news portal published in Dhaka, Bangladesh. The website, along with the Daily Sun, Bangladesh Pratidin, and Kaler Kantho, are owned by East West Media Group, a concern of the Bashundhara Group. Alexa ranked the website 2620 worldwide and 15th in Bangladesh.

== History ==
Banglanews24.com officially launched on 1 July 2010. The other national news agencies at the time were the state-owned Bangladesh Sangbad Sangstha (BSS), the privately owned United News of Bangladesh (UNB), and bdnews24.com.

== Controversies ==
On 23 February 2013, Bangladesh Islamist organisations that included Jamaat-e-Islami Bangladesh and its student front Islami Chhatra Shibir, Hefazat-e-Islam, Islami Oikya Jote, and Nabi Premik Jagrata Janata had vandalized offices of the portal in Chittagong, Bangladesh.

Former minister and current Awami League MP Ramesh Chandra Sen sued the portal for defamation in 2014. A photojournalist of the portal was assaulted by paramilitary Bangladesh Ansar members in Shyamoli, Dhaka in March 2014.
