= Lutfun Nesa =

Bangladeshi politician

Member of Parliament
- In office 5 January 2014 – 2019

Personal details
- Born: 25 December 1985 (age 40) Patuakhali District, Bangladesh
- Party: Bangladesh Awami League

Lutfun Nesa (লুৎফুন নেছা) is a Bangladesh Awami League politician and the former Member of Parliament from Reserve seat-14 of Patuakhali District.

== Early life ==
Nesa was born on 25 December 1985. She studied up to class eight and is a resident of Patuakhali District.

== Career ==
Nesa was nominated to contest the Reserve Seat-14 for women of the Bangladesh Parliament on 5 January 2014. She, along with 48 out of 50 women candidates from reserve seats, were elected unopposed after the main opposition party, Bangladesh Nationalist Party, boycotted the election.

According to a report by the Prothom Alo, her husband, Sultan Ahmed Mridha, is involved in land grabbing in Patuakhali. His alleged land grabbing increased after Nesa became a Member of Parliament in 2014. He is a former leader of Bangladesh Nationalist Party and present member of Bangladesh Awami League. He had served as the chairman of Patuakhali municipality. According to the report he built a brick kiln on grabbed land. Nesa and her husband filed a defamation case against the editor of Bangladesh Pratidin, Naem Nizam, and Staff reporter of Bangladesh Pratidin, Ruhul Amin Russel for writing about the alleged corruption by Nesa and her husband on 21 December 2017. In the case they demanded 100 million taka in compensation.

Nesa's house was vandalized on 21 November 2026 by people from a rally of the ruling Bangladesh Nationalist Party.
