= STV-US =

Bangladeshi television channel

- Station ID of STV-US
- Country: Bangladesh; United States
- Broadcast area: Worldwide
- Headquarters: Kawran Bazar, Dhaka; Queens, New York City

Programming
- Language: Bengali
- Picture format: 576i SDTV

Ownership
- Key people: Naem Nizam (managing director and CEO)

History
- Launched: 22 November 2005; 20 years ago
- Closed: 15 March 2007; 19 years ago

STV-US (Bengali: এসটিভি ইউএস) was a Bangladeshi-American Bengali-language television channel headquartered in Queens, New York City. The chairman of the channel was Hannan Firoze, Vice-Chancellor of Stamford University till 2007 when it was closed down. Fatinaaz Feroz, present chairman of Stamford University, served as the President of STV-US from 2004 to 2007, when it was closed. Naem Nizam, later editor of Bangladesh Pratidin, was the managing director of the channel.

== History ==
STV-US was launched on 22 November 2005 to cover Bangladeshi news in New York City by Hannan Firoze, Vice-Chancellor of Stamford University. Naem Nizam was the founding managing director. It initially did not charge an airing fee. STV and TBC were Bengali language channels based in New York City while Bangla TV was based in London. STV, RTV, and Channel 1 started broadcasting around the same time as part of a wave of new channels opening. It was the first 24-hour Bengali language television channel in the United States.

In 2006, STV-US was the official partner of 1st National Debate Championship 2006 organized by Stamford University. It launched a talk show, Positive Bangladesh, hosted by Bibi Russell.

=== Closure ===
In March 2007, the caretaker government of Bangladesh urged STV-US to cease operations as it was accused of broadcasting illegally without permission or a no-objection certificate. Salim Hossain was the news anchor of the STV till 2007 when it closed and he would later join ATN Bangla USA and Voice of America Bengali. Another reporter of STV, Akbar Haider Kiran, became a correspondent of Voice of America and was also stationed in New York City. Naem Nizam would join Bangladesh Pratidin, largest circulated newspaper in Bangladesh, as editor.

== Programing ==
STV-US focused on news and educational programs.
