= Borak Tower =

- Interactive map of the Borak Tower area

General information
- Type: Commercial
- Architectural style: skyscraper
- Location: Pantha Path, Dhaka, Bangladesh
- Coordinates: 23.7448°N 90.4016°E
- Completed: 2013
- Opening: 2013

Height
- Roof: 210 feet (64 m) Main building
- Top floor: 210 feet (64 m) Main building

Technical details
- Structural system: Reinforced concrete and steel, glass façade
- Floor count: 20 +

Borak Tower (Bengali: বোরাক) is a commercial high-rise complex in Dhaka, Bangladesh. The tower is located at Panthapath in Dhaka. Construction was completed and the building was inaugurated in 2013.
