= Gautam Das =

Bangladeshi journalist

- Born: c. 1978; Bangladesh
- Died: November 17, 2005; Faridpur, Dhaka Division, Bangladesh
- Cause of death: Strangulation
- Body discovered: in Dainik Samakal office
- Resting place: Faridpur, Dhaka Division, Bangladesh
- Occupations: Journalist & bureau chief
- Employer: Dainik Samakal
- Known for: Reporting on crime and corruption
- Spouse: Dipali Das

Gautam Das (c. 1978 – November 17, 2005) was a Bangladeshi print journalist and bureau chief for Dainik Samakal in Faridpur, Dhaka Division, Bangladesh when he was murdered in his office. He was known for his reporting on crime and corruption throughout the area.

== Personal ==
Das was 33 at the time of his death. Das's widow is Dipali Das. Guatam Das is now buried at Chandidashi village of Bhanga Upazila in Faridpur, Bangladesh. On the 9th anniversary of his death, journalist Gautam Das Memorial Association, Faridpur Press Club, and Samakal Surid Samabesh provided various programs to remember the day.

== Career ==
Das was well respected for his reports exposing corruption. He was the Faridpur bureau chief of the Dainik Samakal. He was a journalist for print media. A short time before his murder, Das had published a series of reports for the Dhaka-based daily Samakal, which detailed illegal activity corruption by Bangladesh Nationalist Party officials. In addition, The Associated Press reported Das having written about local government officials accused of taking bribes in exchange for construction contract awards.

== Death ==
Faridpur is located within Bangladesh and shown relative to the capital Dhaka.

Gautam Das was found killed in his office on November 17, 2005. In his office, he was found to be strangled and his hands and legs were fractured. Journalists' leaders in Dhaka protested the killing of Das and gave a three-day ultimatum to the government to arrest the killers. On November 19, 2005, police arrested Tamjid Hossain Babu, 35. Babu is the son of a former Bangladesh Awami League lawmaker. He was arrested from his residence, followed by being produced in court where he was placed on a seven-day remand.

On June 27, 2013, nine assailants were convicted of killing Gautam Das. The Dhaka court sentenced Asif Imran, Asif Imtiaz Bulu, Zahid Khan, Kamrul Islam Apon, Asad Bin Kadir, Siddiqur Rahman Miah, Tamjid Hossain Babu, Rajib Hassan Miah, Abu Taher Mohammad Mortuza Ahsan (Appollo Biswas) to a life in prison. Of these nine convicts, eight are junior politicians belonging to the opposition Bangladesh Nationalist Party.

It was confirmed in court that they had killed Gautam Das for publishing news on the corruption of Faridpur Mujib Road repairing works in the newspaper.

Of the nine convicts, Appollo went in hiding on June 19, 2013, after the court had fixed June 27, 2013 for delivering the judgment in the case. Punishment of Appollo was effective from the day of his arrest or surrender, added by the court. Judge Shahed Noor Uddin also fined 50,000 each and in default they will have to suffer one additional year in jail. During the court date, 27 prosecution witnesses were recorded. The case remained a High Court order for a long while, but charges were framed against the accused on August 15, 2006. An investigation officer on the case pressed charges in the case on January 19, 2006, showing 31 people as prosecution witnesses. During the trial, the judge of the Dhaka Speedy Trial Tribunal, Shahed Nuruddin, called Das “brave, fearless, honest” and a crusader against social injustice and graft as he handed down life sentences to the nine accused.

== Context ==
Attacks on Bangladesh's ethnic and religious minorities has been on the rise for many years according to Desh Rights.

Regarding the case, a colleague of Das called the police after repeatedly failing to contact him by phone and his work door remained locked throughout the day. Police had eventually busted Das' office door down to find his body inside. Colleagues were not aware of any threats against the reporter, but did note the journalist wrote on sensitive topics such as Islamic militant group activities.

Bangladesh Federal Union of Journalists (BFUJ) and Supreme Court Bar Association (SCBA) condemned the killing. Leaders from both of these organizations demanded the arrest and punishment to perpetrators of the murder.

Bangladesh was ranked to be among the fourteen countries worldwide with the worst record of violence against journalists/bloggers, and 19th deadliest country for the press. Since 1992, at least 27 journalists and freelancers have been killed in Bangladesh. However, with Bangladesh being so high in violence against these individuals, only one case—Gautam Das—has had its perpetrators tried and convicted. The motives behind the crimes have only been confirmed in 19 of these cases and the remaining eight are determined unconfirmed.

Of the killings since 1992, the other victims include Mohammad Kamaruzzaman, Saiful Alam Mukul, Mir Eias Hossain, Shamsur Rahman, Nahor Ali, Harunur Rashid, Shukur Hossain, Syed Faruq Ahmed, Manik Saha, Humayun Kabir, Kamal Hossain, Dipankar Chakravarty, Shahid Anwar, Sheikh Belal Uddin, Golam Mahfuz, Belal Hossain Dafadar, Jamal Uddin, Talhad Ahmed Kabid and Sadrul Alam.

While Das' case received the outcome Bangladesh was searching for, not every suspect was prosecuted. During the course of the trial, an accused died. Alongside the accused, all were released on bail right away, and witnesses backed out of the trial as they began to get scared of testifying. Also, in 2006 the case was transferred from the local district court to Dhaka Speedy Tribunal Court 1 for an expedited after being pressured by local journalists—the speedy trial lasted for seven years. The case lasted for several years after a defendant challenged the legality of the transfer.

The legal system in Bangladesh is sure the men prosecuted are the killers behind Das' murder, but what remains unknown is whether or not they were also the masterminds based on the police investigation, witnesses, and confessions from the convicted. Of the nine prosecuted for Das' murder, eight were junior politicians belonging to the opposition Bangladesh Nationalist Party.

== Impact ==
Gautam Das' case is considered a landmark for Bangladesh journalists, as this is the first ever case to prosecute the murderer of a journalist in the country. Following the murder, the International Press Institute claimed the many journalists killed over the past twenty years has compromised their freedom of speech in Bangladesh. Bulbul of the CPJ claims "this is the beginning of the end of the culture of impunity that exists for journalist murders in Bangladesh." Overall, several local journalists in Gautam's surrounding area found that the verdict of his murder was a landmark, being the first time Bangladeshi court had ever successfully prosecuted a murder of a journalist.

== Reactions ==
Just two days after the murder of Das, journalist groups around the country of Bangladesh protested the killing and even protested the government for not doing more to protect the press from acts such as this.

Koïchiro Matsuura, the director-general of UNESCO said, "I condemn the brutal assassination of Gautam Das. I am shocked by the brutal killing of this young reporter and wish to support the large number of Bangladeshi journalists and other professionals who have been calling for the arrest and trial of the perpetrators of this crime. It draws some comfort from the fact that so many people in Bangladesh realize that this crime affects their society as a whole in view of essential role journalists play in sustaining democracy and rule of law."

During Das' funeral, the town was filled with hundreds of people who came to fill the streets and hold rallies demanding exemplary punishment for the killers. Of the rallies, several organizations in Bangladesh participated, such as Bangladesh Federal Union of Journalists, Dhaka Union of Journalists, Jatiya Press Club, and Bangladesh Chamber of Industries.

== See also ==
- List of journalists killed in Bangladesh
