= Daily Bir Chattagram Mancha =

Bangladeshi daily newspaper

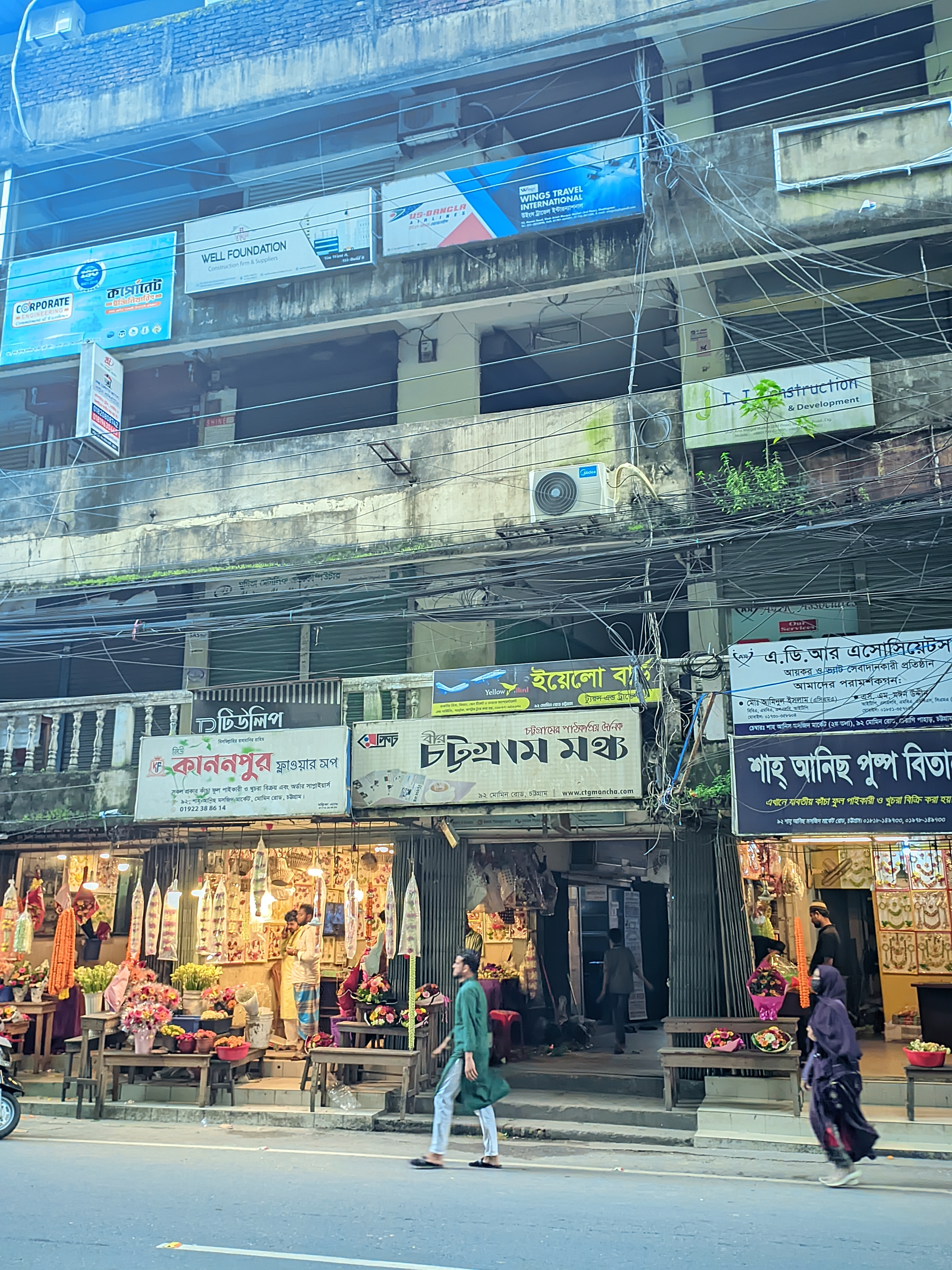
- office in Momin Road
- Type: Daily newspaper
- Format: Broadsheet
- Editor-in-chief: Syed Omar Farooq
- Founded: 1997
- Language: Bengali
- Headquarters: 92 Momin Road; Shah Anis Masjid Market; Chittagong; Bangladesh

Daily Bir Chattagram Mancha (Bengali: দৈনিক বীর চট্টগ্রাম মঞ্চ) is a newspaper in Chittagong, Bangladesh. The newspaper was first published as a weekly in 1997 and since 2000, has operated as a daily newspaper. Syed Omar Farooq is the founding editor-in-chief.

On 22 August 2004, journalist Kamal Hossain, who worked for the Ajker Kagoj and Chattagram Mancha, was murdered at his home in Manikcchari where he was the local correspondent.

During a period of widespread harassment of journalists in the area in 2006, Chattagram Mancha reporter Sukumar Barua was arrested for two days until local journalists agitated for his release. According to reports, seven journalists were tortured and 35 legal cases were filed against them by politicians.

The newspaper and staff has been an active member of the Chittagong Union of Journalists by participating in programmes and token strikes for wages.

== See also ==
- List of newspapers in Bangladesh
- List of journalists killed in Bangladesh
