= Nurul Kabir =

Bangladeshi journalist, writer and activist

- নূরুল কবির
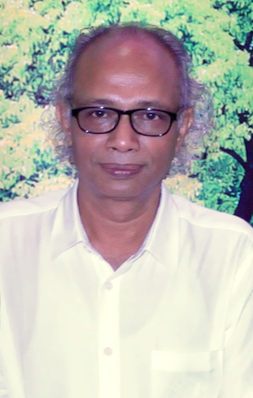
- Kabir in 2020
- Born: 4 November 1960 (age 65); Munshiganj
- Occupations: Writer, editor
- Known for: Journalism, activism, and writing
- Notable work: Nairbachanik Swairatantra O Ganatantrer Sangram, The Red Moulana

Nurul Kabir (born 4 November 1960) is a Bangladeshi journalist, writer, columnist, editor, and activist. He is the editor of the Bangladeshi newspaper, New Age and the editor of the Bengali weekly Budhbar. Nairbachanik Swairatantra O Ganatantrer Sangram and The Red Moulana are two of his most well-known books. On 13 November 2025, he was elected as the President of Editors' Council. He was elected for a two-year term.

== Education ==
Kabir was born in the Munshiganj District of Bangladesh. He received a Bachelor of Law degree from the University of Dhaka in 1983, and a Master of Arts degree in English from the same university in 1984. Also, Nurul Kabir studied advanced journalism at the Thompson Foundation in the UK in 1988, and was awarded the Jefferson fellowship for studying journalism at the East-West Center, the University of Hawaii at Manoa, Hawaii, the US, in 2004.

== Activism ==
During his student life at Dhaka University, Nurul Kabir was a left-wing student leader and activist, who played an active role in forming the Students Committee of Action for Democracy in 1983; the Committee played a decisive role in fighting against the martial law regime during the eighties.

== Journalism ==
Nurul Kabir is the editor of the New Age, the most outspoken newspaper in Bangladesh, highly regarded for its anti-establishment editorial policy. He was also the editor of the Bengali weekly Budhbar. Known for his upright journalism and bold political views, Nurul Kabir wrote many books, published numerous essays at both home and abroad, and presented many papers at regional, national, and international conferences.

Because of his opposition to the military regime of Bangladesh and his defence of media freedom, Nurul Kabir has been attacked on several occasions. In 2007/8 he had both his legs broken and was chased by gunmen on motorbikes.

On 18 December 2025, following the death of Inqilab Mancha spokesperson Osman Hadi, an attack was carried out by violent mobs at the office of The Daily Star, located in the Karwan Bazar area of Dhaka. Nurul Kabir went to the front of The Daily Star building to protest the attack, but he was verbally harassed and branded an "Indian agent" by the mob when he attempted to intervene during the incident.

== Selected publications ==
- The Red Moulana (2012)
- Nairbachanik Swairatantra O Ganatantrer Sangram (2012)
- Kathokota (a collection of interviews) (2014)
- Disposing of a Dictator: Revisiting a Magnificent Mass Uprising after 50 Years (2020)
- Birth of Bangladesh : The Politics of History and the History of Politics (2022)
