= Khalil Rahman =

Bangladeshi political cartoonist

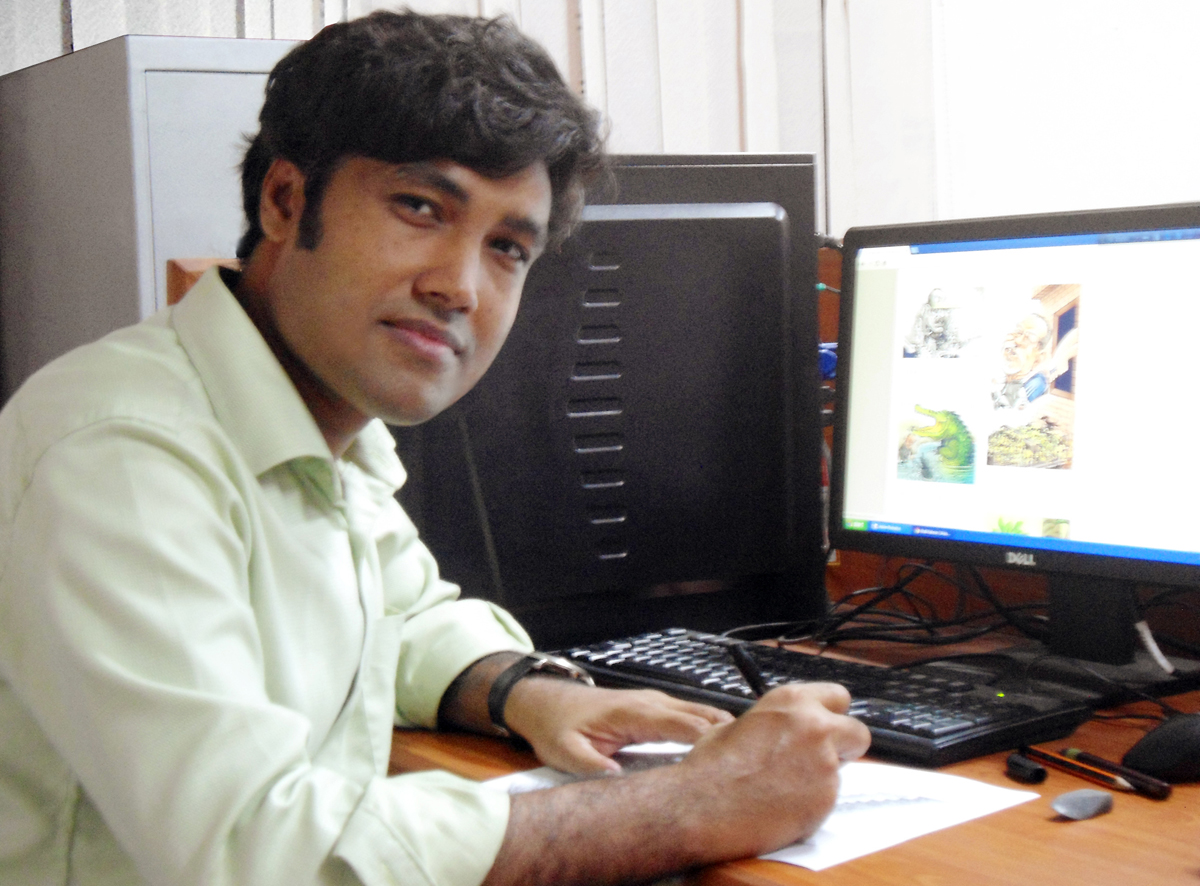
- Born: Khalil Rahman; 16 April 1983 (age 43); Jhenaidah, Khulna, Bangladesh
- Education: Masters (PS)
- Occupation: Cartoonist
- Years active: 2003-present
- Notable work: Political cartoons
- Website: khalilrahman.com

Khalil Rahman (Bengali: খলিল রহমান; born 16 April 1983) is a Bangladeshi political cartoonist. His cartoons have been appearing on the front page of some leading Bengali dailies including Prothom Alo, Jugantor, and Samakal.

== Biography ==
Khalil Rahman was born in 1983 and grew up in a small village in Jhenaidah District. From his school days, he has drawn cartoons for national dailies. But he started his career as a political cartoonist in The New Nation in 2003 when he was studying at university. After he worked 2 years for the newspaper he joined a Bengali daily newspaper. Khalil worked for the newspaper for about 3 years. Then as a cartoonist he joined the Samakal, a leading national daily. His cartoons were regularly published on the front page of The daily for 5 years. At present Khalil is working as a cartoonist for Prothom Alo, a popular daily newspaper in Bangladesh.

=== Cartoons ===
Since his early career days, his political cartoons carry strong messages. His cartoons mostly reflect political violence, injustice, corruption, traffic jams of Dhaka city, load shedding as well as social evils. His cartoons are also distributed internationally by cagle.com, one of the most popular and largest editorial cartoon's websites around the world, which distributes editorial cartoons and columns to over 850 newspapers. Khalil's cartoons have the power inside their strokes to unveil the hidden truth from an event. About his cartoon, American Pulitzer prize winner cartoonist Steave Sack said, 'Khalil Rahman's cartoons are a fresh and witty visual delight. With his vibrant drawing style he expertly comments on today's issues with cleverness and charm. Bangladeshi famous cartoonist Rafikun Nabi (Ranabi) and Shishir Bhattacharya also eulogized him for his cartoons.

=== Books ===
- The Best of Khalil (খলিলের নির্বাচিত কার্টুন) - (2014)
