= Bangladesh Pratidin =

Bengali-language independent daily newspaper

- 9 September 2023 front page of Bangladesh Pratidin
- Type: Daily newspaper
- Format: Broadsheet
- Owner: East West Media Group
- Publisher: Moynal Hossain Chowdhury
- Editor: Abu Taher (Acting Editor)
- Founded: 15 March 2010
- Political alignment: Independent
- Language: Bengali
- Headquarters: Plot -371 / A, Block-D, Bashundhara Residential Area, Baridhara, Dhaka, Bangladesh
- Website: www.bd-pratidin.com

Bangladesh Pratidin (lit. 'Bangladesh Everyday') is a Bengali-language daily newspaper in Bangladesh. It was founded on 15 March 2010. Bangladesh Pratidin tops the list of highest circulated dailies in the country out of 345 newspapers published from Dhaka and elsewhere, the information minister told parliament 10 March 2014. Abu Taher is the Acting Editor of Bangladesh Pratidin. Bangladesh Pratidin is a subsidiary of East West Media Group (EWMG), which is owned by Bashundhara Group. On behalf of EWMG, the publisher of the newspaper is Moynal Hossain Chowdhury.

== History ==
Bashundhara Group is diversifying its operations, beginning with real estate and moving on to the steel industry. It founded a number of media outlets under EWMG including Bangladesh Pratidin in 2009. The first printed paper came out on 15 March 2010. Daily Sun and Kaler Kantho are sister newspapers of Bangladesh Pratidin under East West Media Group.

In 2011, Bangladesh Pratidin had a circulation of 422,405 making it the second highest circulated newspaper in Bangladesh after Prothom Alo which had a circulation of 437,360.

According to the Minister of Information Hasanul Haq Inu based on the data of Department of Films and Publications, Bangladesh Pratidin has the highest circulation in Bangladesh in 2014. This was reported as over 553,000 copies sold daily.

As of January 2018, Bangladesh Pratidin continued to have the highest national print readership, with a circulation figure of 553,300, however Prothom Alo had higher total circulation when the readership of online platforms was included.

In February 2020, the vice president of Dhaka South Chhatra League, Shahidul Islam Khan Riyad, had been suspended for assaulting journalists, including a correspondent of Bangladesh Pratidin, in Faridabad who were covering the Dhaka South City Corporation elections. Those who assaulted them took the phone of Mahabub Momtaji, correspondent of Bangladesh Pratidin, and deleted content on his phone.

In April 2020, a correspondent of Bangladesh Pratidin and News24 were assaulted by Thakurgaon District police. It was part of a pattern of harassment of journalists during the COVID-19 pandemic in Bangladesh. In November 2020, special correspondent of Bangladesh Pratidin, Shaban Mahmood, was appointed Bangladesh minister (press) to the Bangladesh High Commission in India. His term was extended for two years in November 2022. On 24 June 2020, the chief news editor of Bangladesh Pratidin, Mashuk Chowdhury, died in Rushmono Specialised Hospital.

In March 2021, Bangladesh Pratidin awarded 19 individuals on the newspapers 12th anniversary. The Awardees were Atiur Rahman, A. B. Mirza Azizul Islam, Anwara Begum, Arifa Parvin Zaman Moushumi, Gazi Mazharul Anwar, Hafizuddin Ahmed, Helal Hafiz, Jewel Aich, Kangalini Sufia, Khondkar Ibrahim Khaled, Monirul Islam, Mustapha Khalid Palash, Rezwana Choudhury Bannya, Samanta Lal Sen, Selina Hossain, Sheikh Mohammad Aslam, Syed Abdul Hadi, and Zafar Imam.

In February 2022, the search committee for commissioners of Bangladesh Election Commission meet with senior journalists, including the editor of Bangladesh Pratidin Naem Nizam, to seek their input and recommendation. Peer Habibur Rahman, executive editor of Bangladesh Pratidin, died on 5 February 2022.

In August 2022, Border Guards Bangladesh arrested two people in Jhenaidah District near the Bangladesh-India Border with fake currency who falsely identified themselves as journalists of Bangladesh Pratidin.

In February 2023, ten lawyers sent legal notices to governments offices to close street food following reports on the unhygienic conditions in food stalls published in the Prothom Alo and Bangladesh Pratidin.

== Litigation ==
In April 2014, former State Minister of Primary and Mass Education, Motahar Hossain, filed a lawsuit against the editor and publisher of Bangladesh Pratidin, Naem Nizam and Moynal Hossain Chowdhury respectively, over a news item in the paper on 9 April 2014 titled Sabekder Amalnama: Ration Dealer Sabek Protimontri Motaharer Shato Koti Taka. Lalmonirhat Cognizance Court-4, Judge Md Afaz Uddin, issued an arrested warrant against the accused on 11 January 2018. The duo secured an anticipatory bail from Justices Obaidul Hassan and Krishna Debnath of the Bangladesh High Court on 15 January 2018.

In February 2017 the Savar based correspondent of the paper was arrested by Bangladesh Police for fermenting labor unrest, attacking factories, and stealing garments. His lawyer accused the police of torturing him in custody. His family and lawyer claimed he was arrested for his reports on police extortion of garment factory owners.

In February 2018, two leaders of the Awami League in Bogra filed two defamation case against four journalists of Bangladesh Pratidin for a report that alleged they were involved in the Ya ba trade.

In April 2018, Tarique Rahman, vice-chairman of Bangladesh Nationalist Party, sent a legal notice to Bangladesh Pratidin and Kaler Kantho asking them to withdraw a news report based on the statement of Shahriar Alam, state minister for foreign affairs of Bangladesh, in which he alleged Tarique Rahman had renounced his citizenship for foreign one.

In July 2021, the superintendent of Thakurgaon Sadar Hospital, filed a Digital Security Act case against the correspondent of Bangladesh Pratidin, two correspondent of News Bangla, and one correspondent of Jagonews24 over reporting on irregularities concerning the food given to COVID-19 pandemic patients. In August 2021, Azizul Haque Arzu, former member of parliament, sued a correspondent of Bangladesh Pratidin in Pabna District under the Digital Security Act over a news report.

In August 2021, Shamsul Haque Chowdhury, whip of Bangladesh Parliament, filed a defamation case against Ahmed Akbar Sobhan, chairman of Bashundhara Group, Sayem Sobhan Anvir, managing director of Bashundhara Group, Naem Nizam, editor of Bangladesh Pratidin, Imdadul Haq Milan, editor of Kaler Kantho, Enamul Haque Chowdhury, editor of the Daily Sun, and five other journalists.

Barrister M Sarwar Hossain filed a defamation case under the Digital Security Act against seven staff of Bangladesh Pratidin, including publisher and editor, in 2021 accusing the newspaper of running false and defamatory news against him. The Criminal Investigation Department was told to investigate the case by Justice Mohammad Iqbal Hossain of Dhaka Cyber Tribunal by 10 May 2022.

== Products ==
=== Print ===
The main newspaper is printed in Dhaka but an edition is printed in Bogra for North Bengal.

=== North American edition ===
Bangladesh Pratidin has a North American version published from Queens, New York City. It was incorporated on 15 February 2018. It is a weekly version of the newspaper.

=== Europe ===
A European edition is printed from London. Plans were announced for its publication in September 2018.

== Controversies ==
According to the book The Rohingya Crisis and the Two-Faced God of Janus by Rafiqul Islam, Muhammad Mazedul Haque, Umme Wara, Abdullah Yusuf, Roberta Dumitriu, and Mehdi Chowdhury Bangladesh Pratidin has contributed to the negative view of Rohingya refugees in Bangladesh by publishing negative news on the refugees. The book looked at 72 news articles published by Bangladesh Pratidin and found 57 percent covered crimes committed by refugees and 30 percent covered the vulnerability and difficulties faced by Rohingya women.

A study, News coverage on environmental issues: A study on print media of Bangladesh, conducted on Bangladesh media coverage on environmental issues found that Bangladesh Pratidin did not provide adequate coverage to environmental issues and when it did the coverage was minimized in the paper.

== Reputation ==
Bangladesh Pratidin is owned by East West Media Limited a subsidiary of the Bashundhara Group,. The newspaper enjoys popularity among those seeking low cost subscription. Bangladesh Pratidin caters to a lower social-economic group than Prothom Alo or The Daily Star.

=== Awards ===
In September 2011, Zulker Nain Rano of Bangladesh Pratidin received the UNESCO Club Journalism Award from National Association of UNESCO Clubs at the Bangladesh National Commission for UNESCO.

Bangladesh Pratidin journalist, Ruhul Amin Rasel, received the 'Centre for NRB (non-resident Bangladeshis) Award-2020' at the World Conference Series-2020.

Debashish Biswas, a journalist of Bangladesh Pratidin, received Journalism Award 2022 from Rajbari Circle based in Rajbari District in 2022.

== See also ==
- List of newspapers in Bangladesh
- New Age
- The Daily Ittefaq
- Prothom Alo
