= Daily Sun (Bangladesh) =

English-language newspaper in Dhaka, Bangladesh

- Logo of Daily Sun
- Type: Daily Newspaper
- Format: Broadsheet
- Owner: Bashundhara Group
- Publisher: Maynal Hossain Chowdhury
- Editor: Md. Rezaul Karim Lotus
- Founded: October 24, 2010
- Language: English with Bangla (Online)
- Headquarters: East West Media Group Limited, Plot No: 371/A, Block No: D, Bashundhara R/A, Baridhara, Dhaka -1229
- Website: daily-sun.com

Daily Sun is an English-language daily newspaper published in Dhaka, Bangladesh, founded in 2010. It also operates an English news portal and a Bangla news portal, apart from maintaining a website for the e-version of the published copies. The main paper has 16 pages including 4 pages on business and 2 on sports. Daily Sun is owned by East West Media Group, a concern of Bashundhara Group.

Rezaul Karim Lotus is the Editor of the Daily Sun, Tasvir Ul Islam is the Executive Director, and Suman Kumar Saha is the Editor of Business and Economic Affairs.

== Description ==
The Daily Sun is an English-language daily newspaper published in Dhaka, Bangladesh. Also it publishes Bengali-language daily news. It was founded in 2010. The main paper has 16 pages including 4 pages on business and 2 pages on sports which is called "Winner".

The Daily Sun is owned by East West Media Group, a part of Bashundhara group, along with Bangladesh Pratidin, Kaler Kantho, and online news portal Banglanews24.com. Professor Syed Anwar Husain was the founder editor of this newspaper.

== Weekly supplements ==
Its weekly supplements include:

- Groove
- The Hood
- Morning Tea

== See also ==
- List of newspapers in Bangladesh
