= M. A. Hannan Feroz =

Bangladeshi entrepreneur and academic (born 1965)

M. A. Hannan Feroz was a Bangladeshi entrepreneur, academic, and vice-chancellor and president of Stamford University. He was the president of the editorial board of Daily Amader Shomoy and editor of Daily Bangladesh Shomoy. He was the chairman of STV-US.

== Early life ==
Feroz was born on 1 October 1965 in Rajapur Upazila, Jhalakati District, East Pakistan, Pakistan. He did his bachelor's degree and master's in commerce at the University of Dhaka in 1977. He completed his PhD at the London Institute of Technology and Research.

== Career ==
Feroz was a lecturer at Stamford College Group in Malaysia from 1987 to 1993. He founded Stamford University in 1994. He became a visiting professor at University at Buffalo and Claflin University in 1998. From 2002 to 2008, Feroz was the vice chancellor of Stamford University, of which he was the founding president. In May 2006, he entered the university campus under police protection following protests by students demanding improvements to services and facilities on campus.

In 2005, Feroz became the founding chairman of STV-US, based in New York City. He became and editor of publisher of The Daily Bangladesh Shomoy in 2007.

In July 2014, Bangladesh Police detained Feroz on charges of ordering a hit against AKM Enamul Hoque Shameem, leader of the Awami League and member of the board of trustee of Stamford University, who was shot but survived. An inspector of the Detective Branch and lead investigator alleged Feroz had hired a hitman to shoot and kill Shameem. Rapid Action Battalion suggest the attack was linked with a dispute over the ownership of Stamford University. He secured bail in August. He signed an MOU with Bangladesh Academy for Rural Development on 10 January 2015.

== Personal life ==
Feroz was married to Fatinaaz Feroz.

== Death ==
Feroz died on 29 October 2017 from a brain stroke in Dhaka, Bangladesh. AKM Enamul Hoque Shameem attended an event marking the first death anniversary of Feroz.
