= Shahed Muhammad Ali =

Shahed Muhammad Ali is a Bangladeshi journalist, columnist and editor. He currently serves as the editor of the Bangla-language daily newspaper Samakal.

He started his journalism career as a sub-editor of Bhorer Kagoj in 1996. Before becoming editor of Samakal, he had been appointed as acting editor of Kaler Kantho.
