= Kaler Kantho =

Bangladeshi national daily newspaper

Kaler Kantho; দৈনিক কালের কণ্ঠ
- Type: Daily newspaper
- Format: Broadsheet
- Publisher: Maynal Hossain Chowdhury on behalf of East West Media Group PLC
- Editor: Mahadi Hasan Talukder
- Founded: 10 January 2010; 16 years ago
- Political alignment: Centre-left
- Language: Bengali
- Headquarters: East West Media Group PLC, Plot No: 371/A, Block No: D, Bashundhara R/A, Baridhara, Dhaka-1229 and Printed at Plot No: C/52, Block-K, Bashundhara, Khilkhet, Badda, Dhaka
- Website: kalerkantho.com

Kaler Kantho (Bengali: কালের কণ্ঠ) is one of the Bengali newspapers in Bangladesh. It is a part of East West Media Group, which is a part of Bashundhara Group. The same group owns Bangladesh Pratidin, Daily Sun, News24, Banglanews24, and Radio Capital.

Abed Khan was the founder editor of Kaler Kantho. The daily was first published on 10 January 2010. Khan resigned as editor in June 2011. After Khan's resignation, Imdadul Haq Milan, a popular novelist from Bangladesh, became the editor. Shahed Mohammad Ali, former senior news editor of Prothom Alo, became the acting editor on 3 October 2021 after Milan became the EWMG director and brand ambassador.

On 18 August 2024, the offices of Kaler Kantho were vandalized.

There are many features and daily pages in Kaler Kantho, including - Chakri Ache (Career and jobs), Tech Bisshow (IT feature page), Tech Pratidin, Oboshore, A2Z, Dosh Dik (Literature), Biggapon biroti, Doctor Achen (Health), Kothay Kothay, Rongey Mela (Entertainment), Ghorar Dim (Fun), Mogoj Dholai, and Tin Tin Toon Toon.

== Controveries ==
Kaler Kantho was criticized by NCP leader Hasnat Abdullah, on social media for publishing alleged misleading news against National Citizen Party and its party members.

== See also ==
- List of newspapers in Bangladesh
- List of city corporations in Bangladesh
- List of companies of Bangladesh
- Bengali-language newspapers
