= Kebab Turki Baba Rafi =

Indonesian kebab shops

PT Baba Rafi Indonesia
- Trade name: Kebab Turki Baba Rafi
- Type: Subsidiary
- Industry: Kebab shop
- Founded: 2003; 23 years ago (original); 2005; 21 years ago (franchise)
- Founders: Hendy Setiono; Nilam Sari
- Headquarters: Pondok Labu, Cilandak, South Jakarta, Indonesia
- Number of locations: 1,300+ (2022)
- Area served: Indonesia; Malaysia; Singapore; Philippines; Sri Lanka; Brunei Darussalam; China; Netherlands; India
- Products: Kebabs, hamburgers, sandwiches, roti canai, drinks, kripik, frozen foods
- Parent: Baba Rafi Enterprise
- Website: www.babarafi.com

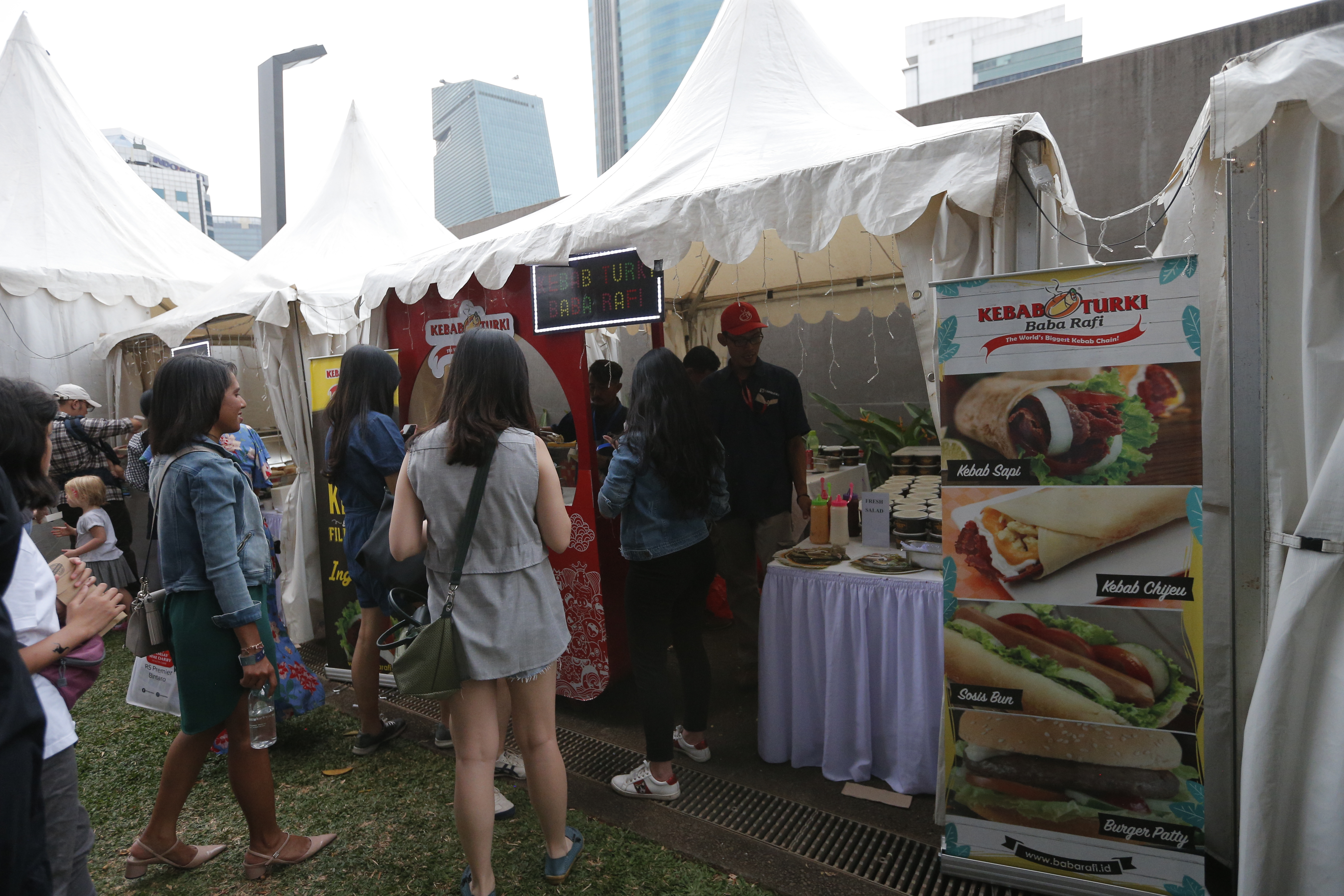
A Kebab Turki Baba Rafi stand at the 2019 Gig on the Green at the Embassy of Australia, Jakarta

PT Baba Rafi Indonesia, d/b/a Kebab Turki Baba Rafi (abbreviated as KTBR) is the world's largest chain of kebab shops, which operates more than 1,300 outlets in Indonesia, Malaysia and the Philippines as of 2022. Headquartered in Indonesia, the business began in 2003 as a cart operated by young entrepreneurs, Nilam Sari and Hendy Setiono. In 2005, the business applied the franchise system. It is owned by the founders through their company Baba Rafi Enterprise, which also owns Piramizza, Bebek Garang, and Voila! 360’ communication agency.

An outlet is operated either by a franchisee or by the corporation itself. It is also a pioneer of sharia investing franchise in Indonesia. A variety of outlet types are used, such as food carts, shops, booth, indoor, and non-stop 24-hour outlets.

Kebab Turki Baba Rafi primarily sells shawarmas, hamburgers, sandwiches (such as shawarma and hot dogs), kripik, roti canai, and frozen foods.

The Philippines outlets also serves drinks, such as matcha, lemonade, and tamarind.

== History ==
The business began in 2003, with a cart operated by husband and wife team Nilam Sari and Hendy Setiono at Nginden Semolo Street in Surabaya, Indonesia. They built the business inspired by a journey to Qatar and the many sellers of Turkish-style doner kebab or shawarma. The "Baba Rafi" name was taken from Arabic word, "baba" meaning father, and "Rafi" is inspired from their first child's name, Rafi Darmawan.

In 2005, the business applied the franchise system for growing the business. It expanded to Malaysia, the expansion succeeded. The outlets operate not only in Indonesia, but also in Malaysia and the Philippines. Later, Kebab Turki Baba Rafi has continued its expansion into Singapore, Brunei, China, Sri Lanka, the Netherlands, Hong Kong, and India. By 2015, the company imports around 200 tonnes (200 long tons; 220 short tons) of halal-certified meat from New Zealand every three months.

== Headquarters ==
The Kebab Turki Baba Rafi headquarters complex, Graha Baba Rafi, is located in Pondok Labu Cilandak, South Jakarta. The office from Nginden Semolo, Surabaya and its facility moved to Jakarta, between 2008 and 2009.
