= Bonik Barta =

- Type: Daily newspaper
- Format: Broadsheet and online edition
- Publisher: Dewan Hanif Mahmud
- Editor: Dewan Hanif Mahmud
- Founded: 7 June 2011
- Language: Bengali
- Headquarters: BDBL Bhaban (Level 17), 12 Kazi Nazrul Islam Avenue, Karwan Bazar, Dhaka-1215
- Country: Bangladesh
- Website: bonikbarta.com

Bonik Barta is a Bengali-language daily newspaper published from Dhaka, Bangladesh. The paper began publication on 7 June 2011. Dewan Hanif Mahmud is its founder, editor and publisher. Since its founding, the paper has given particular emphasis to news on business, trade and economics. Over time, its coverage has expanded to include politics and national affairs as well.

Alongside its print edition, Bonik Barta runs an online news portal and an e-paper. In addition to news reporting, the paper organises conferences, policy discussions and award ceremonies on economics, education, health, agriculture and other national issues.

== History ==
Bonik Barta began publication on 7 June 2011. At its founding, the paper gave primary emphasis to news on business, trade and the economy. Over time, the scope of its coverage widened, and alongside business and economic news, the paper began publishing reports on politics, national affairs and other areas.

== Description ==
Bonik Barta is a daily newspaper published in broadsheet format. Its print edition typically runs to six columns and 16 pages. Alongside the main paper, a special tabloid supplement titled Silk Route is published once a week, carrying features on history, culture and archaeology, among other subjects.

The paper also carries several regular subject-based pages, notably Sasthojotno (health and medicine), Common Room (youth, education and campus-related topics), and Novera (lifestyle, art and culture).

Besides its print edition, Bonik Barta maintains an online news portal and an e-paper.

== Circulation ==
In a list of circulation figures and advertisement rates for Bengali-language dailies registered in Dhaka, published on 16 September 2018 by the Department of Films and Publications, Bonik Bartas circulation was recorded at 134,000.

== Events and initiatives ==
Beyond news publication, Bonik Barta organises conferences, conclaves, policy discussions and other events on various subjects. Among these, the Bangladesh Economic Conference is notable. Its fourth edition was held in 2025, bringing together political parties, economists and policymakers to discuss the country's economy and policymaking.

The paper also organises Policy Conclaves on various economic and policy issues, covering topics such as food prices, market systems, LPG and energy security. It has additionally hosted the Sonar Bangla Policy Dialogue and various round-table discussions.

Since 2014, Bonik Barta has jointly organised the Gunijon Shongbordhona (Honouring the Eminent) with the Bangladesh Institute of Development Studies (BIDS), recognising individuals for their contributions across various fields. It has also presented an Entrepreneur Honour Award to entrepreneurs.

In partnership with the Faculty of Business Studies at the University of Dhaka, Bonik Barta organises the Non-Fiction Book Fair. Its ninth edition was held in 2026.

The paper has also organised various conferences, conclaves and fairs on higher education, health, agriculture and the financial sector, including the Bangladesh Higher Education Conference, the Bangladesh Health Conclave, the Agriculture, Food Security and Nature Conference, and the NBFI Fair.

== Book publishing ==
Bonik Barta runs its own publishing programme, through which it has released books on business, economics, management and related subjects, including titles on the lives and careers of entrepreneurs and businesspeople. In 2023, the paper published Sheikh Akij Uddin: Jibon O Shomoy (Sheikh Akij Uddin: Life and Times), a biography of Sheikh Akij Uddin.

== See also ==
- List of newspapers in Bangladesh
- Bangladesh Sangbad Sangstha
- United News of Bangladesh
