= Radio Capital FM 94.8 =

Radio Capital 94.8 FM রেডিও ক্যাপিটাল
- Dhaka; Bangladesh
- Frequency: 94.8 FM

Programming
- Language: Bengali
- Format: Music
- Affiliations: East West Media Group

Ownership
- Owner: Bashundhara Group
- Sister stations: News24, T Sports

History
- Founded: November 2015
- First air date: November 2015

Links
- Webcast: Listen Radio Capital
- Website: Radio Capital

Radio Capital FM 94.8 is a radio station based in Dhaka, Bangladesh. Bangladeshi journalist Naem Nizam was the founder CEO of the radio station.

== History ==
Radio Capital was established in November 2015 as a company of East West Media Group a subsidiary of Bashundhara Group. It broadcasts on 94.8 FM. It also broadcasts online.

Commercial Broadcasting from 02.01.2017

== Special Capital program ==
- Good Morning Capital
- Janen Bhabi
- Capital Cocktail
- Naat Boltu
- Tabiz
- Tumi Ami Ar Gaan
- Capital Theatre
- Moddhorater Voboghure

== See also ==
- Bangladesh Betar
- Swadhin Bangla Betar Kendra
- Banglanews24.com
- Bangla Tribune
