= Matiur Rahman Chowdhury =

Bangladeshi journalist, editor and talk-show host

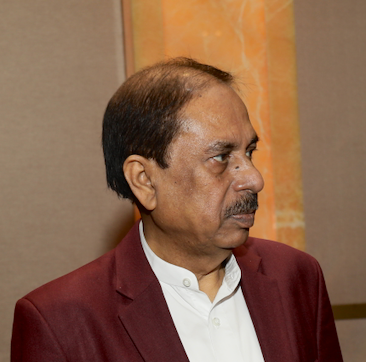
- Matiur in 2024
- Occupation: Journalist
- Spouse: Mahbuba Chowdhury
- Children: Mehzeb Chowdhury
- Awards: Ananda Alo Purashkar

Matiur Rahman Chowdhury is a Bangladeshi journalist, editor and talk-show host. He is the editor-in-chief of the Manab Zamin, a Bengali language tabloid newspaper. Chowdhury also reports for Voice of America (Bangla) as a correspondent. He has hosted a late night chat-show, Ajker Sangbadpatra, on Channel i, a privately owned broadcast channel, since 2005.

He also hosted another political chat-show, called Frontline, on Banglavision, before it was suspended citing "technical problems". However, several journalists including Chowdhury claimed that authorities were behind the closure.

Chowdhury serves as treasurer of the Newspaper Owners' Association of Bangladesh (NOAB) and a member of Editors' Council, an organisation of newspaper editors in the country. In addition, Chowdhury is a member of the governing body of Association for Social Advancement, a micro-credit financing organisation. He was an editor for the now-defunct Bangla Bazar Patrika, a broadsheet newspaper based in Dhaka, Bangladesh.

Chowdhury participated in Bangladesh Liberation War in 1971 and was tortured by the Pakistan Army in his native Moulvibazar District.

== Personal life ==
Chowdhury is married to Mahbuba Chowdhury, a poet, journalist, and news presenter. Their only son, Mehzeb Chowdhury, is a barrister and a forensic science and criminal investigation researcher.

== Career ==
Chowdhury began his career in journalism as a correspondent with Daily Banglar Bani, co-founded and edited by Sheikh Fazlul Haque Mani, a nephew of Sheikh Mujibur Rahman, Bangladesh's founding father, shortly after the country became independent, according to an article he wrote for Manab Zamin. Having obtained the university degree, he soon became a staff reporter at Daily Banglar Bani. In 1974, he was fired from the paper allegedly on the instruction of the authorities, according to a short biography.

He later worked at Purba Desh, Daily Desh Bangla as a chief reporter, and then at The Sangbad. In 1980, his press accreditation was allegedly revoked by the government.

In 1982, he joined The Daily Ittefaq, where he worked as its diplomatic correspondent for 10 years. He covered the Gulf War for Ittefaq from Hafar al-Batin, Saudi Arabia.

As the first Bangladeshi journalist, he covered 1990 FIFA World Cup and five subsequent tournaments (the most for any Bangladeshi journalist), interviewing the likes of Diego Maradona, Paolo Rossi and John Barnes among a host of others.

In the early nineties, he joined Ajker Kagoj as associate editor but resigned shortly afterwards.

In 1994, he founded Bangla Bazar Patrika as its editor. In 1995, he wrote an article in the vernacular daily implicating BNP politician Morshed Khan, then a special adviser to Prime Minister Khaleda Zia, in a banking scandal. In response, Khan brought a case against Chowdhury, resulting in his arrest and subsequent bail.

In 1997, he founded Manab Zamin as its editor-in-chief.

In 2000, the tabloid ran the transcript of an implicating phone conversation between Hussain Muhammad Ershad, a former president, and a High Court judge, Latifur Rahman, who was overseeing the former's graft case. The publication of the recording triggered a judicial investigation. The court, however, held Chowdhury for contempt of court and awarded him six months of prison sentence, which was stayed on appeal.

In 2006, he was accused of playing down the revelation of terror plots in Britain as "the game of the British government" in the Aajker Sangbadpatra programme he hosted in Channel.

In 2009, an Awami League politician filed a Tk. 100 crore defamatory case against three journalists including Chowdhury for publishing "a false report".

On 9 March 2020, Chowdhury and 31 others, was sued by a ruling Awami League lawmaker for a story his newspaper ran about a sex ring operated out of a luxury hotel in Dhaka, triggering responses from Amnesty International, Human Rights Watch, and other press organizations. He maintained that the story did not have any reference of the said lawmaker. The high court later granted him bail.

=== Politics ===
Chowdhury was elected the vice president of Moulvibazar College student union. He was associated with Bangladesh Chhatra League, the student wing of Bangladesh Awami League, and acted as the organisation's central books and publications secretary.

== Books ==
Chowdhury published three books: Inside Politics, Palashi Theke Baghdad, Kutnitir Andarmahal.
