= Bashundhara City =

Shopping mall in Dhaka, Bangladesh

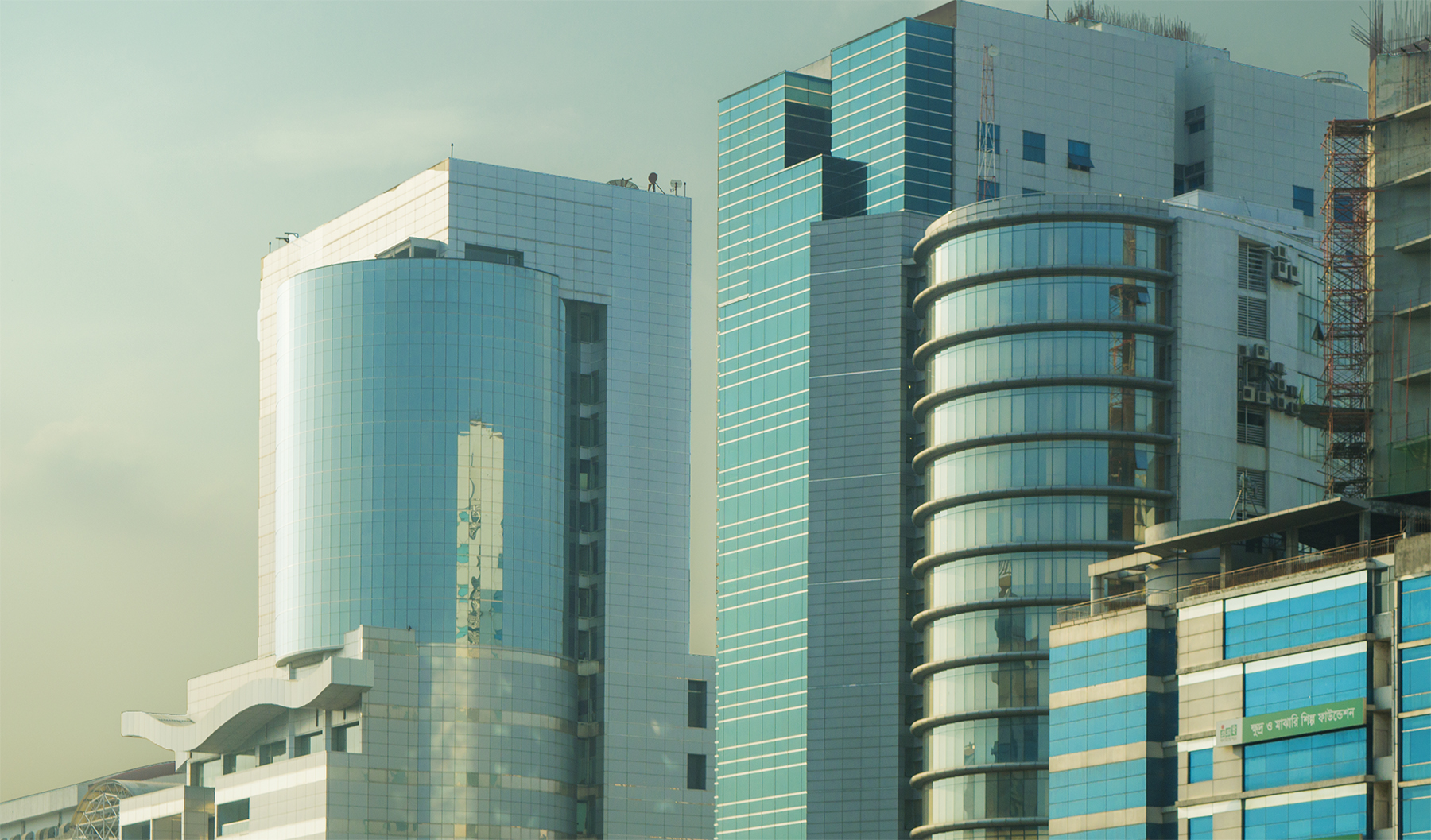
- Bashundhara City Shopping Complex shopping centre on the left
- Interactive map of the Bashundhara City area

General information
- Location: Panthapath, Dhaka, Bangladesh
- Coordinates: 23°45′4.71″N 90°23′26.28″E
- Opening: 4 October 2004

Technical details
- Floor count: Mall: 1 to 8 Office: 9 to 19
- Floor area: 111,480 m2 (1,200,000 sq ft) (of the mall; excluding the top floors used as commercial space)

Other information
- Number of stores: 2,325 shops including 100 food courts.
- Number of anchors: 9
- Parking: 500 cars
- Public transit: MRT Line 6 Kawran Bazar metro station (450m)

Website
- www.bashundhara-city.com

Bashundhara City (Bengali: বসুন্ধরা সিটি), often marketed as Bashundhara City Shopping Complex or Bashundhara City Shopping Mall, is a shopping mall in Dhaka. The mall is located in Panthapath, near Karwan Bazar, and was opened to the public on 6 August 2004. The building complex is 19 stories tall and comprises the shopping mall occupying the lower podium floors, while corporate offices are located on the upper floors. The shopping mall has a floor area of 111,480 m^{2} (1,200,000 sq ft), making it the second largest mall in the city and the country behind Jamuna Future Park. It is also one of the largest shopping malls in South Asia, with up to 50,000 visitors each day.

The mall has space for 2,325 retail stores and cafeterias. It features a large Gold's Gym gymnasium and fitness club with a swimming pool, a movie theatre by Bangladeshi movie theatre chain Star Cineplex, a penthouse food court, and a theme park named Toggi World. It also includes the 19-story corporate offices of the Bashundhara Group. There used to be an ice skating rink, which is now permanently closed.

It is designed by the principal architect Mustapha Khalid Palash and Mohammad Foyez Ullah of Vistaara.

== Construction ==
Construction started in 1998 under Shafiat Sobhan, the vice-chairman of the Bashundhara Group. The cost of the building was more than US$57 million.

== 2009 fire ==
On 13 March 2009, the top floors of the Bashundhara City complex caught on fire. The blaze started around 1:30 pm, after Friday prayers, on one of the top floors. Most of the offices were empty, as Friday is the first day of the weekend in Bangladesh. A security guard died as he jumped off the top of the building to escape the fire and seventeen other people were injured. The chief security officer of the building was rescued from the rooftop by a Bangladesh Air Force Bell 212 helicopter.

Later that day, reports announced the deaths of three more people found in an elevator by a group of fire fighters and the number of injured people climbed to fifty. Most of the injuries were caused by smoke inhalation. The fire took six hours to be brought under control due to the strong summer winds. The city's mayor, Sadeque Hossain Khoka, ordered all the fire services in the capital to the scene and requested assistance from army personnel. The fire attracted thousands of onlookers outside the complex from Panthapath to Hatirpool, causing heavy traffic.

The fire was extinguished after nearly ten hours. Most of the victims who died were employees, and most of the shoppers were unharmed. The mall was closed for two days and was once again opened to the public on 16 March. According to the mall authorities, damages reached Tk2 billion (US$29m). Minister of Home Affairs Tanjim Ahmad Sohel ordered a three-member committee to review the incident. He proclaimed the damage was caused due to the lack of fire-protection equipment during the time of the incident.

== Gallery ==
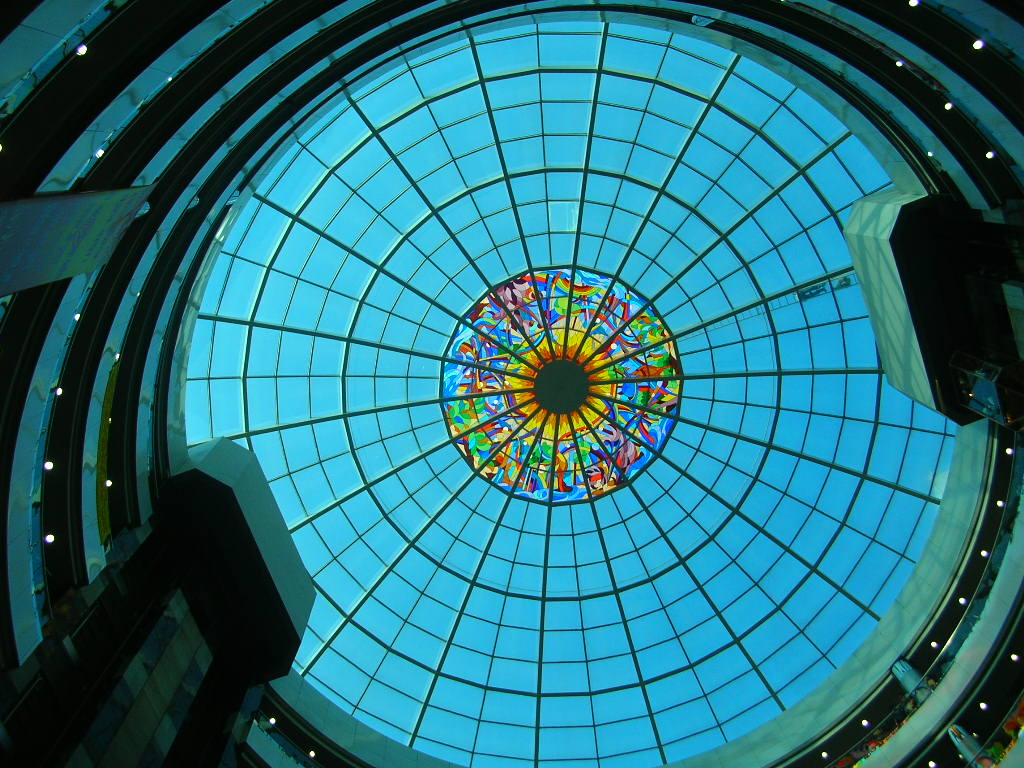
Dome of Bashundhara City Mall.

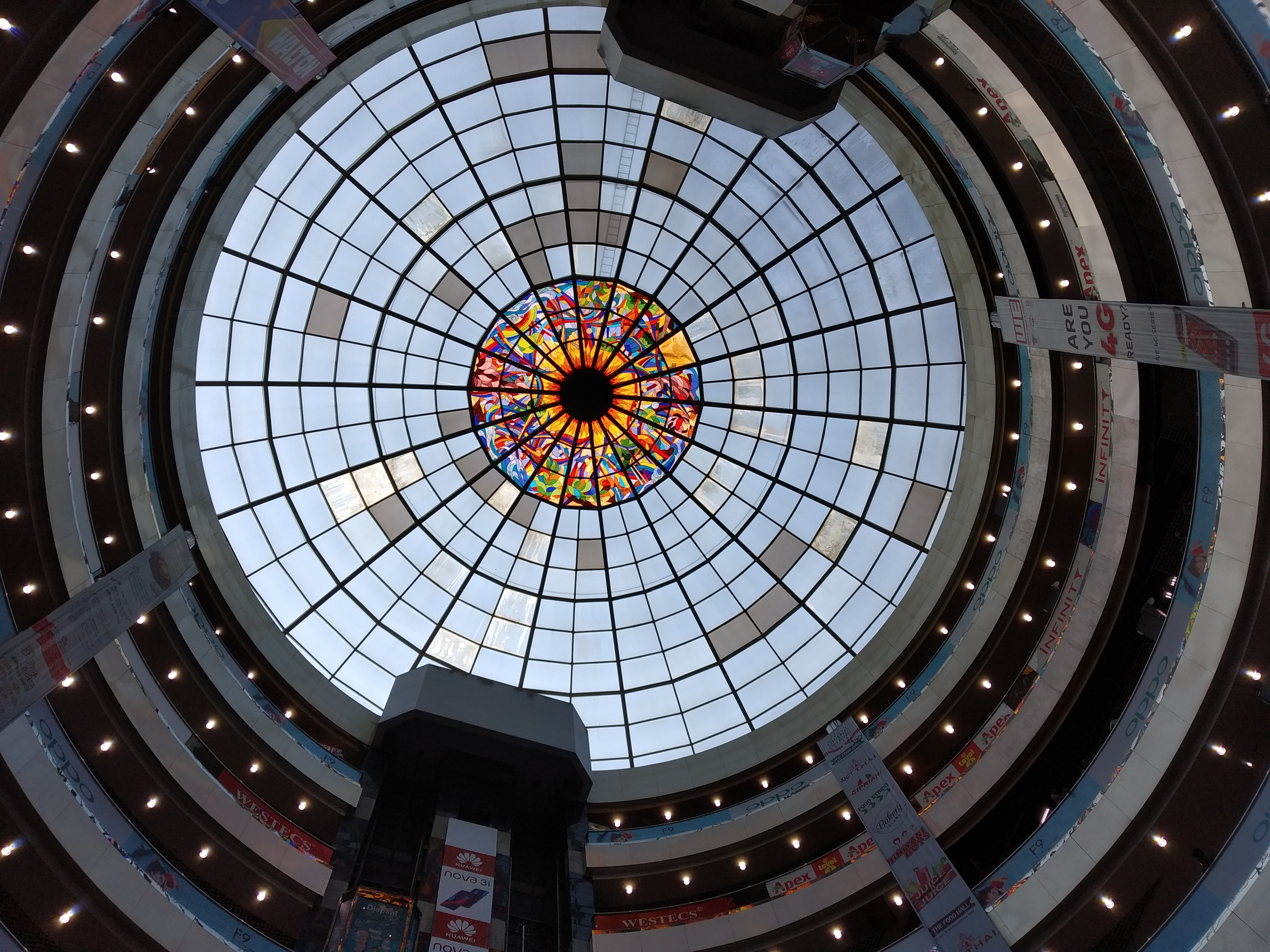
Dome of Bashundhara City Shopping Complex

Interior of Bashundhara City Mall.

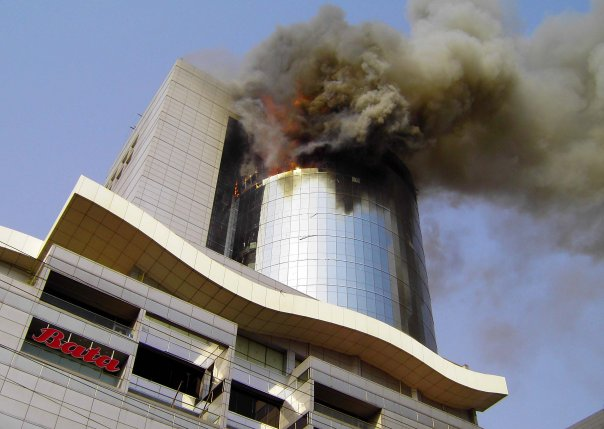
Blaze at The Bashundhara City March 2009 Fire.

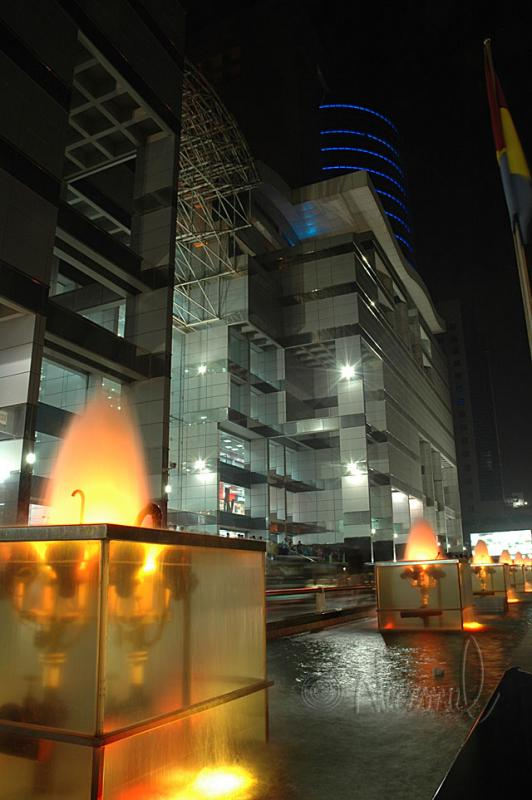
At night.

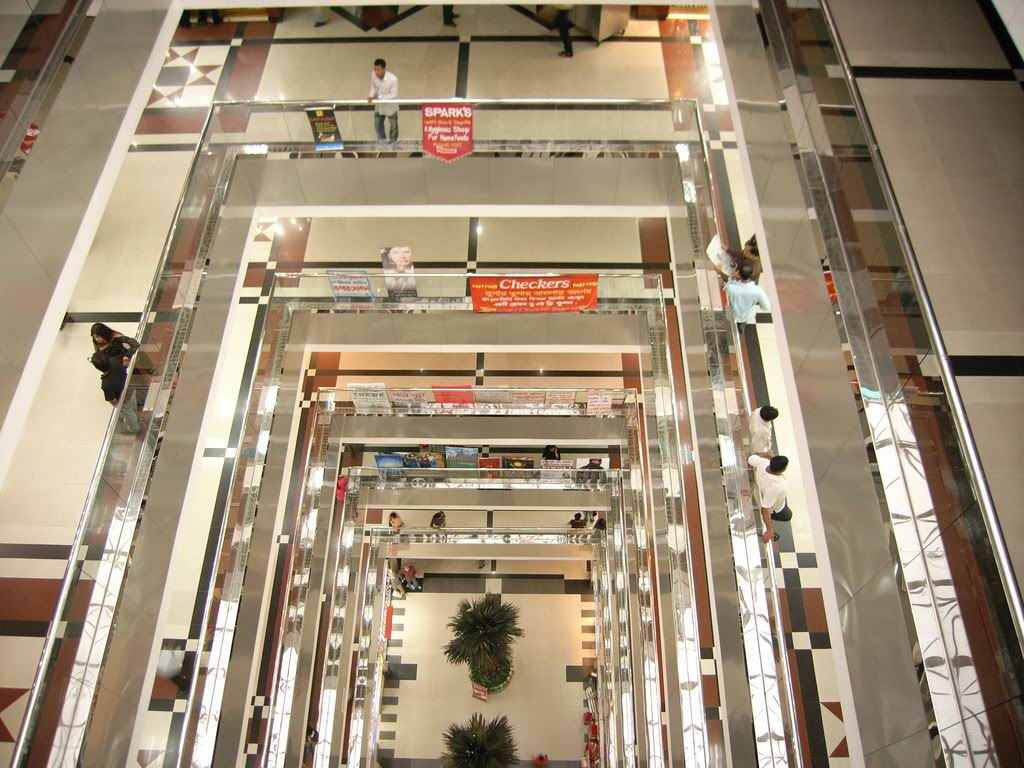
Interior.

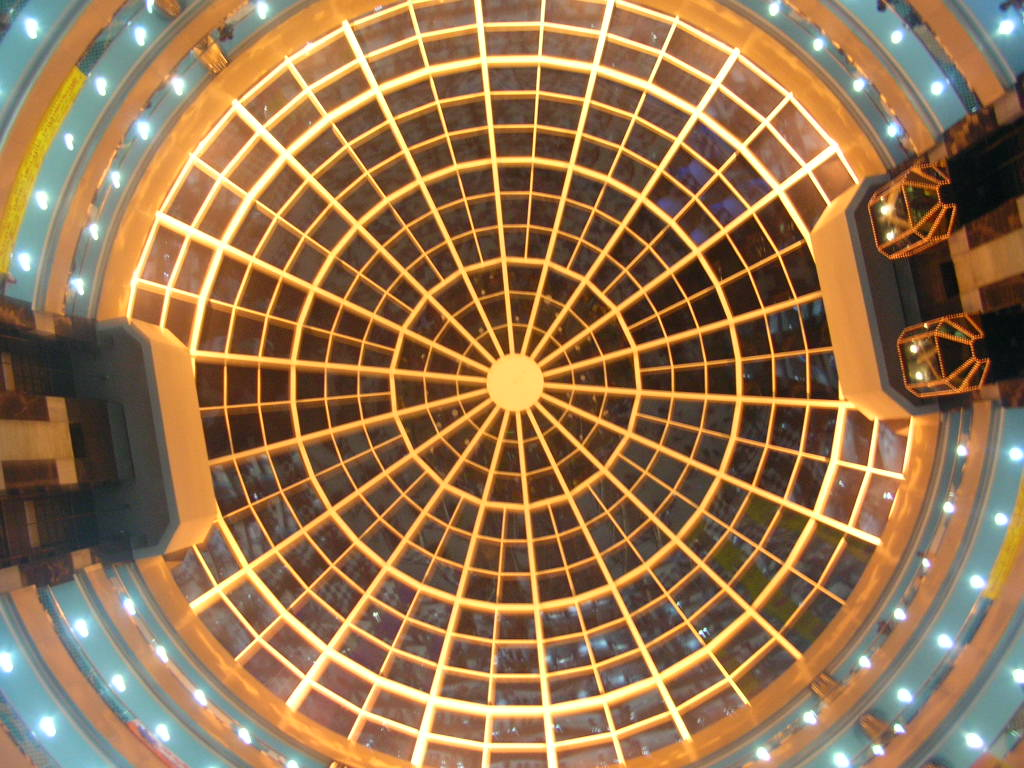
The Dome at night.

== See also ==
- List of shopping malls in Bangladesh
- Architecture of Bangladesh
- Jamuna Future Park
