= Naem Nizam =

Bangladeshi journalist

- নঈম নিজাম
- Born: 11 November 1965 (age 60); Goharua (Bhuiyan Bari), Nangalkot, Comilla
- Education: Tejgaon College; Dhaka University
- Occupations: Journalist and editor
- Employer: Bangladesh Pratidin
- Known for: Editorship of Bangladesh Pratidin and ATN Bangla
- Spouse: Farida Yasmin (m. 1990)
- Children: 2

Naem Nizam (born 5 November 1965) is a Bangladeshi journalist, writer, columnist, and editor of daily Bangladesh Pratidin. Nizam is also the director of East West Media Group, the largest media conglomerate in Bangladesh. He is former CEO of News24 and Radio Capital. He is the former managing director of STV-US.

Nizam philanthropic endeavors have led to the establishment of Heshakal Bazar Naem Nizam Degree College in his hometown of Comilla, Bangladesh. He is the vice president of Sheikh Russell KC, a professional football club based in Dhaka, Bangladesh, currently playing in the Bangladesh Premier League. He is a member of Newspaper Owners' Association of Bangladesh.

Nizam's career has spanned many decades where he has been involved with starting up multiple national media organizations in Bangladesh, including ATN Bangla, Bangladesh Pratidin, News24, T-Sports, the Daily Sun, and STV US."

== Early life ==
Nizam was born on 11 November 1965 in Nangalkot Upazila, Comilla District, East Pakistan, Pakistan.

== Career ==
Nizam started his career in the late 1980s as a political correspondent and worked at national newspapers Ajker Kagoj and Bhorer Kagoj.

=== ATN bangla ===
Nizam was founding news editor of ATN Bangla. ATN Bangla began broadcasting Bengali-language news programming on 16 August 2001. It later began airing English-language news programming on 1 October 2002. Nizam served as the chief news editor of ATN Bangla.

=== STV ===
Nizam was the managing director of STV-US, a Bengali language television channel based in New York City in 2006.

=== News 24 ===
Nizam served as first CEO of News24, a 24 hour news channel, and is currently director of its parent company, East West Media Group. In November 2013, the Bangladesh Telecommunication Regulatory Commission granted East West Media Group a broadcasting license to operate News24. It received its frequency allocation in January 2015. The channel began test broadcasts on 25 March 2016.

=== Bangladesh Pratidin ===
Nizam is a member of the Editors' Council a grouping of the newspaper editors of Bangladesh. In that capacity he along with other editors including that of Prothom Alo signed a statement demanding the release of Mahmudur Rahman, protesting the raid on newspaper Daily Inqilab and the arrest and harassment of journalists across the Bangladesh. They also criticized the new broadcast policy saying it would harm the freedom of the media.

Nizam was sued by Ashikur Rahman Miku, general secretary of the Bangladesh Volleyball Federation following the publication of a critical report about him 18 May 2012. On 3 June 2012, Miku filed a defamation case against him. On 15 September 2015, Senior Judicial Magistrate Md Zakaria of a Narail court issued an arrest warrant against him. Nizam secured bail from the court after appearing before it.

On 6 July 2014, Nizam attended an iftar hosted by former Prime Minister Khaleda Zia for prominent newspaper editors and journalists.

In March 2015, Nizam received threats from Safiur Rahman Farabi, an Islamic extremist. Farabi was arrested by the Rapid Action Battalion and charged under Information and Communication Technology Act. On 11 April 2019, Farabi was acquitted by Judge Ash Sams Joglul Hossai of the Cyber Tribunal Court. On 16 February 2021, Farabi was sentenced to life imprisonment in the Avijit Roy murder case.

On 5 October 2017, Nizam was summoned a local Dhaka Court by Metropolitan Magistrate Debabrata Biswas following a case filed by Dhaka Lawyers Association President Saidur Rahman Manik. The case alleged a joke about lawyers in an editorial by Member of Parliament Golam Mawla Rony defamed lawyers. In December 2017, he was sued by reserved Member of Parliament, Lutfunnesa following a report on Bangladesh Pratidin on corruption by her and her husband. The member of parliament was criticized by the Bangladesh Federal Union of Journalists and the Dhaka Union of Journalists for filling the case.

On 16 August 2017, a legal notice was served against Nizam by the organizing secretary of the Bangladesh Awami Olama League, Maulana Abdul Jalil, for publishing a column by Taslima Nasreen. On 23 August 2017, Nizam was appointment member of the Bangladesh Press Council.

An arrest warrant was issued against Nizam in January 2018, following a defamation case filed by Awami League politician and State Minister of Primary and Mass Education, Motahar Hossain. He had filed the defamation case following a report on his corruption published on Bangladesh Pratidin on 9 April 2014. The issue of an arrest warrant was condemned by the Bangladesh Federal Union of Journalists and the Dhaka Union of Journalists. He condemned the passage of the Digital Security Act, 2018.

On 16 September 2019, Nizam was elected general secretary of the Editors' Council while Mahfuz Anam was elected president. In a statement of the Editors Council he condemned the usage of Digital Security Act to arrest journalists. In August 2020, a statement issued by the council and signed by Nizam condemned the absence of national newspapers from the "government list of online news portals". The statement said it was unreasonable to require special permission or separate licenses for online versions of national newspapers.

In 2020, Nizam was awarded the Bashir Ahmed Award. In June, Bangladesh Financial Intelligence Unit investigated his accounts and that of his colleague in Bangladesh Pratidin, Peer Habibur Rahman. He called on the Ministry of Finance to reduce the import duty on newsprint in a virtual meeting with Finance Minister AHM Mustafa Kamal in April 2021.

Nizam was elected director of Sheikh Russel KC, sponsored by Bashundhara Group, on 29 May 2021.

== Bibliography ==
- TV News (2011) - A guide book on TV journalism and Technical aspects of broadcast journalism based on his experiences.
- BDR Bidroho (2011)
- Ghure Beraye deshe deshe (2015)
- Electronics and Print Journalism (2015)
- Jyotishi Ballen kkhomota Gele Mantri Jele (2015)
- Vromoner Koto Kahini (2016)
- 'Print Journalism (2016)
- Chander Aloye Mritu Dekha (2016)
- Nirbachito Colum (2017)
- Gano Adalat (2017)- about the Gono Adalat.
- Amar Kichhu Katha (2017)
- Rong Mahal (2018)
- General Moeen ke bidai diyese Pranab (2018)

== Personal life ==
Nizam is married to journalist Farida Yasmin since 1990 and has two children. Farida Yasmin was a member of the 12th Bangladeshi Parliament. She is the current two-term president of the National Press Club of Bangladesh. Previously, she was elected the first female general secretary and first female president of the National Press Club of Bangladesh.
