= Panthapath =

Panthapath পান্থপথ
- Road
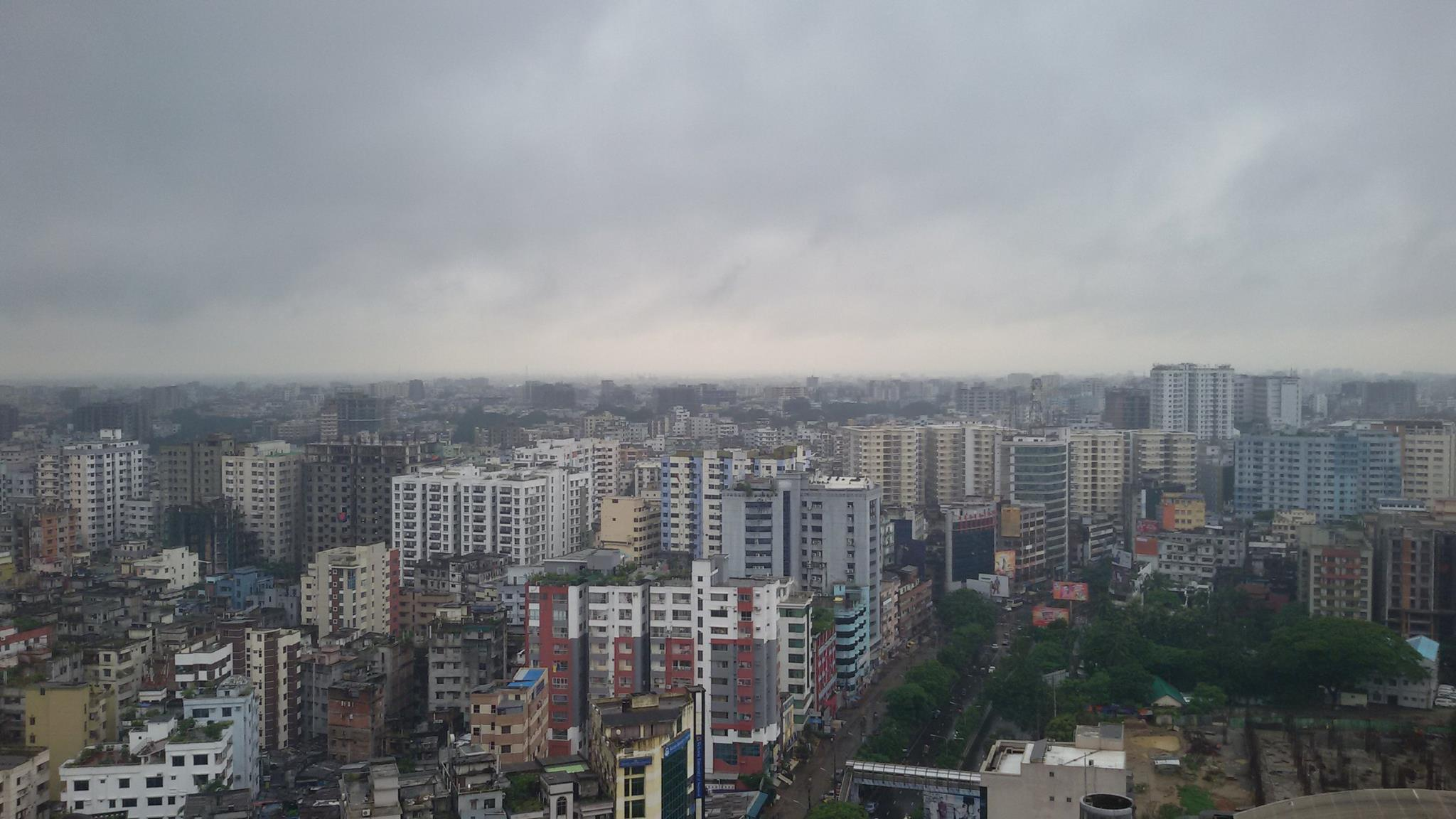
- Skyline of Panthapath
- Expandable map of vicinity of Panthapath
- Location of Panthapath within Dhaka Location of Panthapath within Dhaka Division Location of Panthapath within Bangladesh
- Coordinates: 23.7519°N 90.3855°E
- Country: Bangladesh
- Division: Dhaka Division
- District: Dhaka District
- Established: 1900
- Elevation: 23 m (75 ft)
- Time zone: UTC+6 (BST)

Pantapath is an important east-west road in Dhaka City, the capital of Bangladesh. It connects Tongi Diversion road, Mymenshing Road (now Old Airport Road) and Mirpur Road.

== Features ==
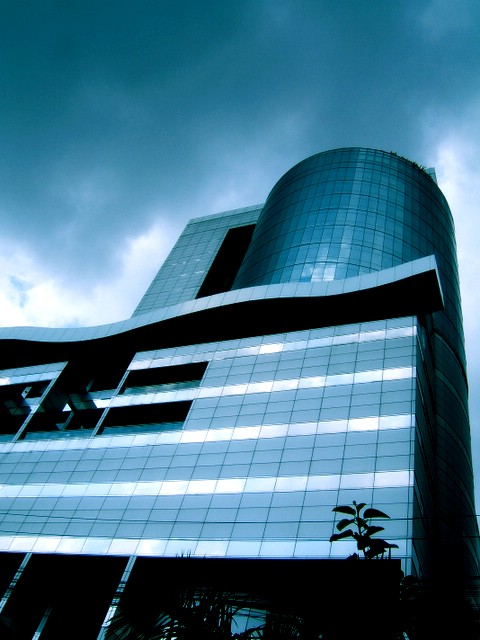
Bashundhara City

Panthapath is home to one of South Asia's largest shopping centers, Bashundhara City. Other landmarks are Square Hospital, Samorita Hospital, Unique Trade Center, etc. Green Road intersects this road at about the middle from north to south.

There was originally a canal connecting Hatirjeel-Begunbari with Dhanmondi Lake. But in late 1980, this east–west road was constructed. The construction of the road was completed in 1995. Bangladesh Film Development Corporation (FDC) and Hotel Pan Pacific Sonargaon are also located on the eastern section of this road.

There are two mosques in Pantapath.
