= Mustapha Khalid Palash =

Bangladeshi architect and multidisciplinary artist

- মুস্তাফা খালীদ পলাশ
- Born: 11 September 1963 (age 62); Dhaka, East Pakistan (present day Bangladesh)
- Education: Bangladesh University of Engineering and Technology
- Occupations: Architect, artist

Mustapha Khalid Palash (born 11 September 1963) is a Bangladeshi architect and artist.

== Early life and education ==
Palash was born to artist Afroz Mustapha (d. 2018). He graduated with a Bachelor of Architecture degree from Bangladesh University of Engineering and Technology in 1988. He worked as an assistant professor at Bangladesh University until 1998, then held visiting faculty positions in the Department of Architecture at the University of Asia Pacific, North South University and BRAC University.

== Career ==
After graduating, Palash established Vistaara Architects with Mohammed Foyez Ulla and Shahzia Islam.

He has participated in architectural exhibitions, seminars, and workshops in Bangladesh and internationally, and has undertaken architectural consultancy projects.

Palash is a member of the Institute of Architects Bangladesh, an international associate member of the AIA, and a member of the Council on Tall Buildings and Urban Habitat (CTBUH) and the World Architecture Community. He served as president of the Architecture Alumni Association of BUET (7th Executive Committee) in 2013 and 2014.

Palash serves as editor of the quarterly DOT: Journal on Art & Architecture.

=== Architecture projects ===
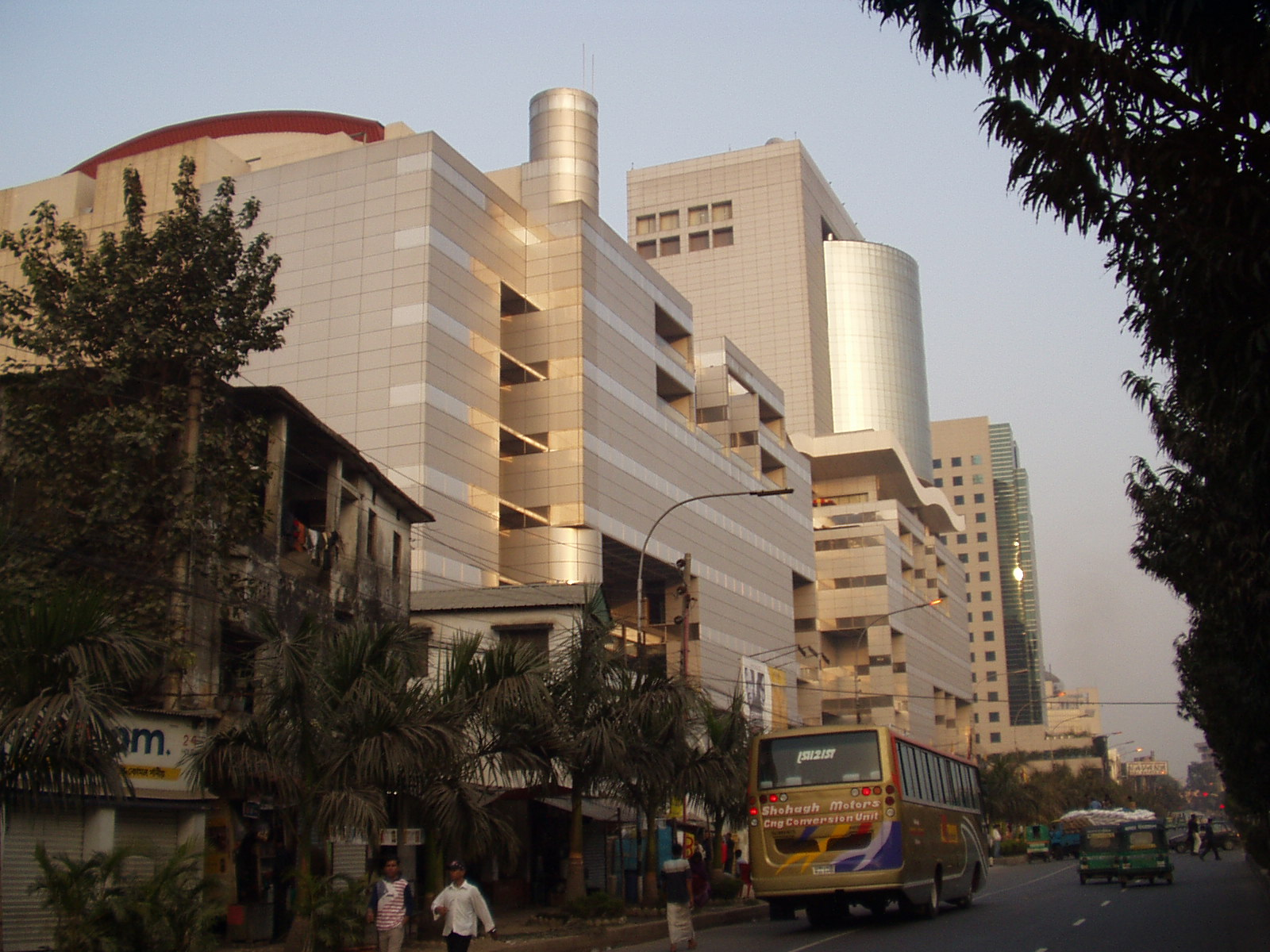
Bashundhara City

Peoples Insurance Bhaban (PIB)

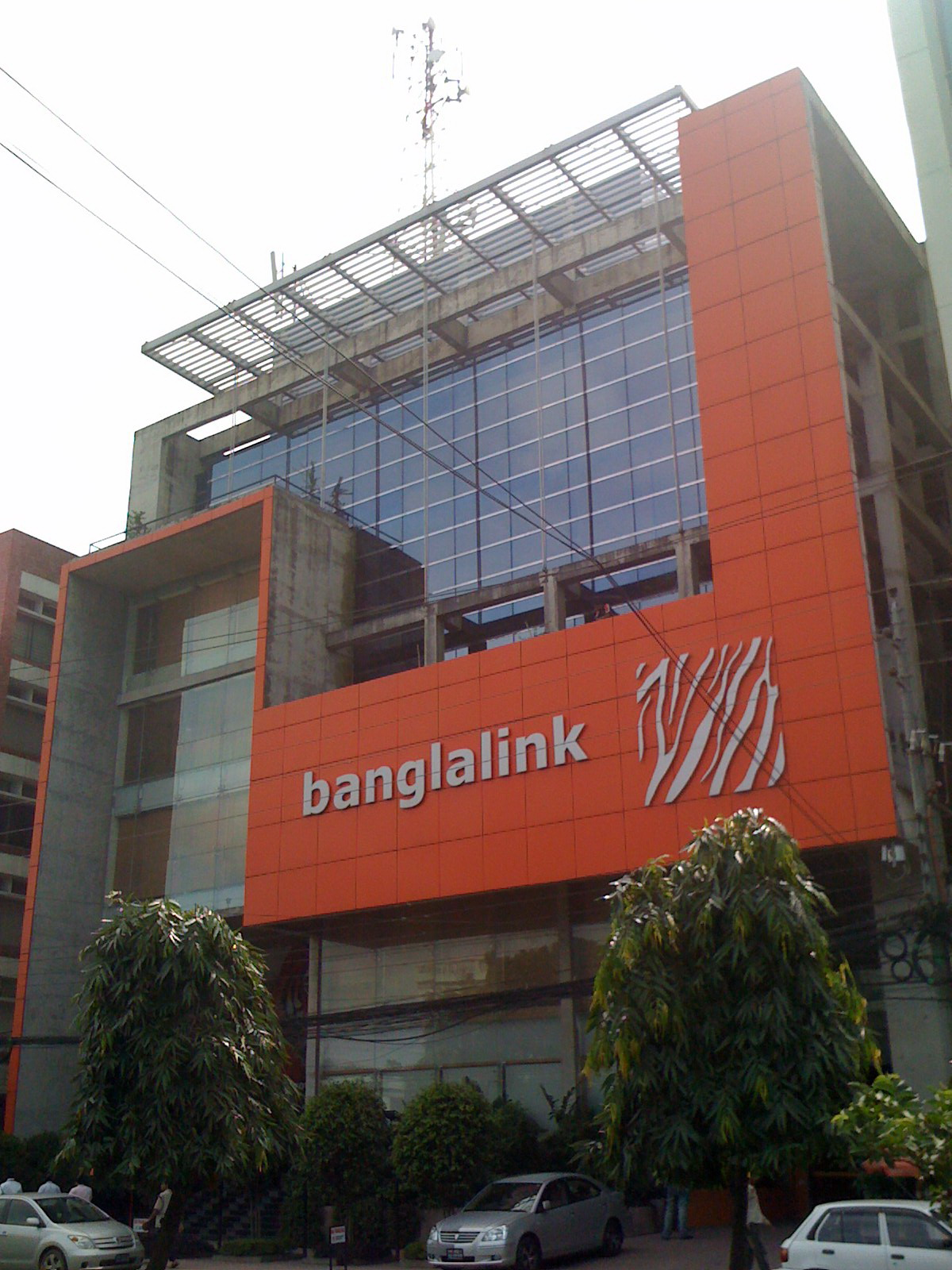
Tiger's Den (Banglalink's headquarter)

==== Corporate Offices ====
- Grameenphone Corporate Headquarters
- Banglalink Head Office
- Robi Head Office
- Health Engineering Department (HED) Headquarters, Ministry of Health & Family Welfare
- Investment Corporation of Bangladesh (ICB) Headquarters
- EBL Headquarters
- Mobil House
- Rangs RD Square
- Jamuna Bank Ltd Headquarters
- Bank Asia Headquarters
- Union Bank Headquarters
- Standard Bank Headquarters
- Uttara Motors Limited Headquarters
- Grand Delvistaa
- Jamuna Gas Building
- Samsonite Tower

==== Malls and Centres ====
- Bashundhara City Shopping Complex
- Unique Trade Centre (UTC)
- SPL Western Tower
- Bashundhara Fitness Center
- Shahara Centre
- Anabil Tower
- Rangs Babylonia
- BTI Landmark
- Rupayan Maxus
- Konik Tower
- Raffas Tower
- Samsonite Tower
- Elegant Tower
- Konka Jubilee Tower
- Palmal Tower
- Delvistaa Syed Villa
- Hosaf Tower
- Irving Rishta
- Shaptak Square
- RTV Studio
- Skylark Tower

==== Hotels and Hospitals ====
- Radisson Bay View Hotel Chittagong
- Hilton Dhaka
- The Westin Dhaka
- Lab Aid Cardiac Care Hospital
- The Olives, Dhaka

==== Universities and Schools ====
- State University of Bangladesh
- American International School Dhaka (AISD)

=== Visual art ===
Palash works as a painter in addition to his architectural practice. His solo painting exhibition Of Conflict and Harmony was held in 2009 at the Gallery of Fine Arts of Asiatic Society, Dhaka. In June 2011, his third solo exhibition, titled Of Tears and Joy, was displayed at Dhaka Art Centre.

== Awards and recognition ==
- Shilpacharya Puroshkar (Award) for Fine Arts Architecture 2011
- Berger Commendation Award for Excellence in Architecture (Grameenphone House), 2011
- Institute of Architects Bangladesh (IAB) Design Award 1998
- Holcim Green Built Bangladesh Award, 2010
- Berger Award for Excellence in Architecture, 2007
- Architect of the Year Award, instituted by JK Lakshmi Cement, India
