= Samakal =

Bengali-language daily newspaper

- 08-09-2023 cover of Samakal.
- Type: Daily newspaper
- Format: Broadsheet
- Owner: Ha-meem Group
- Publisher: Abul Kalam Azad
- Editor: Sahed Muhammad Ali
- Founded: 31 May 2005
- Language: Bengali
- Headquarters: Dhaka, Bangladesh
- Website: samakal.com

Samakal (Bengali: সমকাল, lit. 'Contemporary') is a Bengali-language daily newspaper published in Dhaka, Bangladesh. The paper is owned by Ha-Meem Group. It began publication in 2005.

== History ==
Golam Sarwar was the editor of the paper from its launch until his death in 2018. Sahed Muhammad Ali became Editor of Samakal in 2025. In 2020, Samakal had a circulation of 270,000, which made it the eighth most widely read newspaper in the country.

Over the years, the paper's writers have included Ajoy Dasgupta, Abed Khan, Mizanur Rahman Khan, and Khalil Rahman. Gautam Das, the paper's Faridpur bureau chief, was murdered in November 2005 by junior Bangladesh Nationalist Party (BNP) politicians after reporting on corruption in the party.

== See also ==
- List of newspapers in Bangladesh
- Bengali-language newspapers
- Amar Desh
- Dainik Bangla
- Daily Inqilab
- The Daily Sangram
- Daily Naya Diganta
- Daily Janakantha
