= Manab Zamin =

Bangladeshi Daily Newspaper

The Daily Manab Zamin

- 10-09-2023 cover of Manab Zamin.
- Type: Daily newspaper
- Format: Tabloid
- Publisher: Mahbuba Chowdhury
- Editor-in-chief: Matiur Rahman Chowdhury
- Founded: 1998; 28 years ago
- Political alignment: Liberal
- Language: Bengali
- Headquarters: Daily Manab Zamin; 40 Zenith Tower, Kawran Bazar; Dhaka; Bangladesh
- Website: mzamin.com

The Daily Manab Zamin (Bengali: মানবজমিন lit. People's Land) is a major daily tabloid newspaper in Bangladesh, published from Dhaka in the Bengali language. It is the first and largest circulated Bengali tabloid daily in the world, with 19,000,000 monthly pageviews on its online edition. 1.6 million visitors from 189 countries from all over the planet visit the web site every month, making it one of the most visited Bengali-language online publications worldwide. It is ranked within the World Top 500 newspaper web sites of the world, and is in the top 1% of all sites globally.

== See also ==
- List of newspapers in Bangladesh
- Bengali-language newspapers
