= News24 (Bangladeshi TV channel) =

Bangladeshi News channel

- Country: Bangladesh
- Broadcast area: Nationwide
- Headquarters: Bashundhara Residential Area, Baridhara, Dhaka

Programming
- Language: Bengali
- Picture format: 1080i HDTV (downscaled to 16:9 576i for SDTV sets)

Ownership
- Owner: East West Media Group
- Sister channels: T Sports

History
- Launched: 28 July 2016; 10 years ago

Links
- Website: news24bd.tv

News24 (Bengali: নিউজ টোয়েন্টিফোর), stylized as NEWS24, is a Bangladeshi Bengali-language satellite and cable pay television channel dedicated to news programming. It began broadcasts on 28 July 2016 and is owned by East West Media Group, a subsidiary of Bashundhara Group. News24 is based in the Bashundhara Residential Area in Baridhara. News24 is sister to T Sports, a sports channel, and privately owned radio station Radio Capital.

== History ==
In November 2013, the Bangladesh Telecommunication Regulatory Commission granted East West Media Group a broadcasting license to operate News24. It received its frequency allocation in January 2015. Its logo was officially revealed in February 2016. The channel began test broadcasts on 25 March 2016 at 19:00 (BST). News24 was one of the nine Bangladeshi television channels to sign an agreement with Bdnews24.com to subscribe to a video-based news agency run by children called Prism in May 2016. The channel officially went on the air on 28 July 2016, claiming to stay "biased to the people" at its inaugural ceremony in the International Convention City Bashundhara in Dhaka.

== Programming ==
- Aj Shokaler Bangaldesh
- Alokito Protidin
- Amar Krishi Amar Khamar
- Antorjatik Sangbad
- Bangladesh Live
- Bishesh Sakkhatkar
- Bisshe Onno Rokom Sangbad
- Biz Sanglap
- Chattogram Protidin
- Dupurer Sangbad
- English News
- Islam o Amra
- Jonotontro Gonotontro
- News24 Business
- News24 Desh
- Newsroom Sanglap
- Orthoniti Bhabna
- Rater Sangbad
- Shastho Sanglap
- Sholpo Doirgho Golpo
- Shondhar Sangbad
- Sokaler Sangbad
- Sports Special
- Team Undercover

== Organisation ==
Sayem Sobhan is the managing director of News24. Shahnaz Munni is the chief news editor. Naem Nizam was the CEO of the channel from its inception until November 2021, when he was relieved from his position.

== See also ==
- List of television stations in Bangladesh
