= Imdadul Haq Milan =

Bangladeshi novelist and journalist

- ইমদাদুল হক মিলন
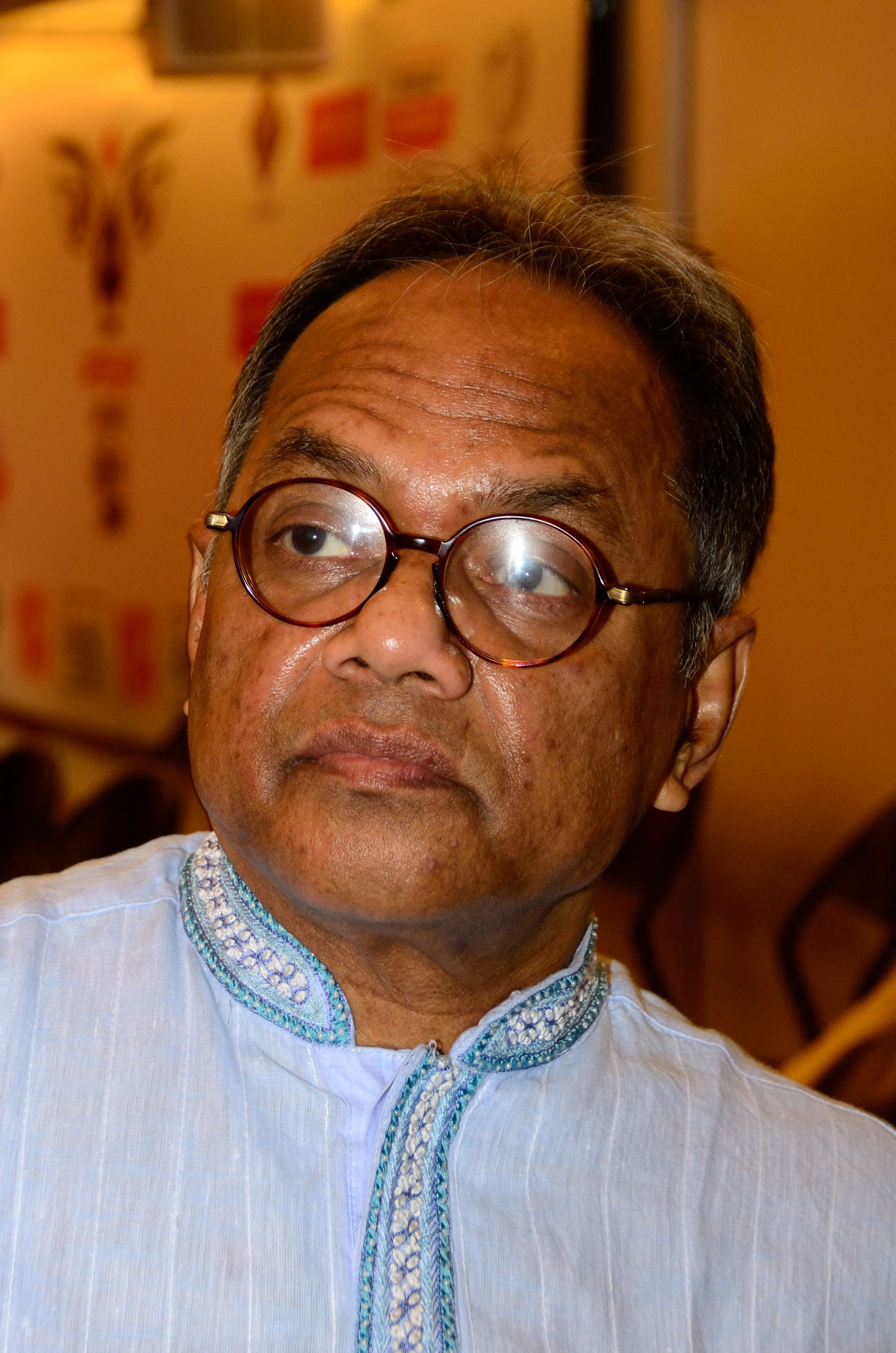
- Milan in 2015
- Born: 8 September 1955 (age 71); Munshiganj District, East Bengal, Dominion of Pakistan
- Education: BA
- Alma mater: Jagannath College
- Occupations: Author; dramatist; editor; columnist; television personality
- Awards: Bangla Academy Literary Award, Ekushey Padak

Imdadul Haq Milan (born 8 September 1955) is a Bangladeshi novelist and journalist. He was editor of the daily newspaper Kaler Kantho. He is the founder of Bashundhara Shuvosangho a platform dedicated to social welfare, humanitarian service, and community development.He is the recipient of Bangla Academy Literary Award in 1992 and Ekushey Padak in 2019. In 2018 He received Kazi Mahbub Ullah award.

== Early life and education ==
Born in Bikrampur, Milan spent his childhood with his maternal grandmother. He then moved to Gendaria in Dhaka. He wrote his first story Bondhu in 1973. Bangla Academy's Uttaradhikar magazine published his first novel Jabojjibon. Milan graduated from Jagannath College, now Jagannath University, located in Sadarghat, Dhaka.

== Works ==
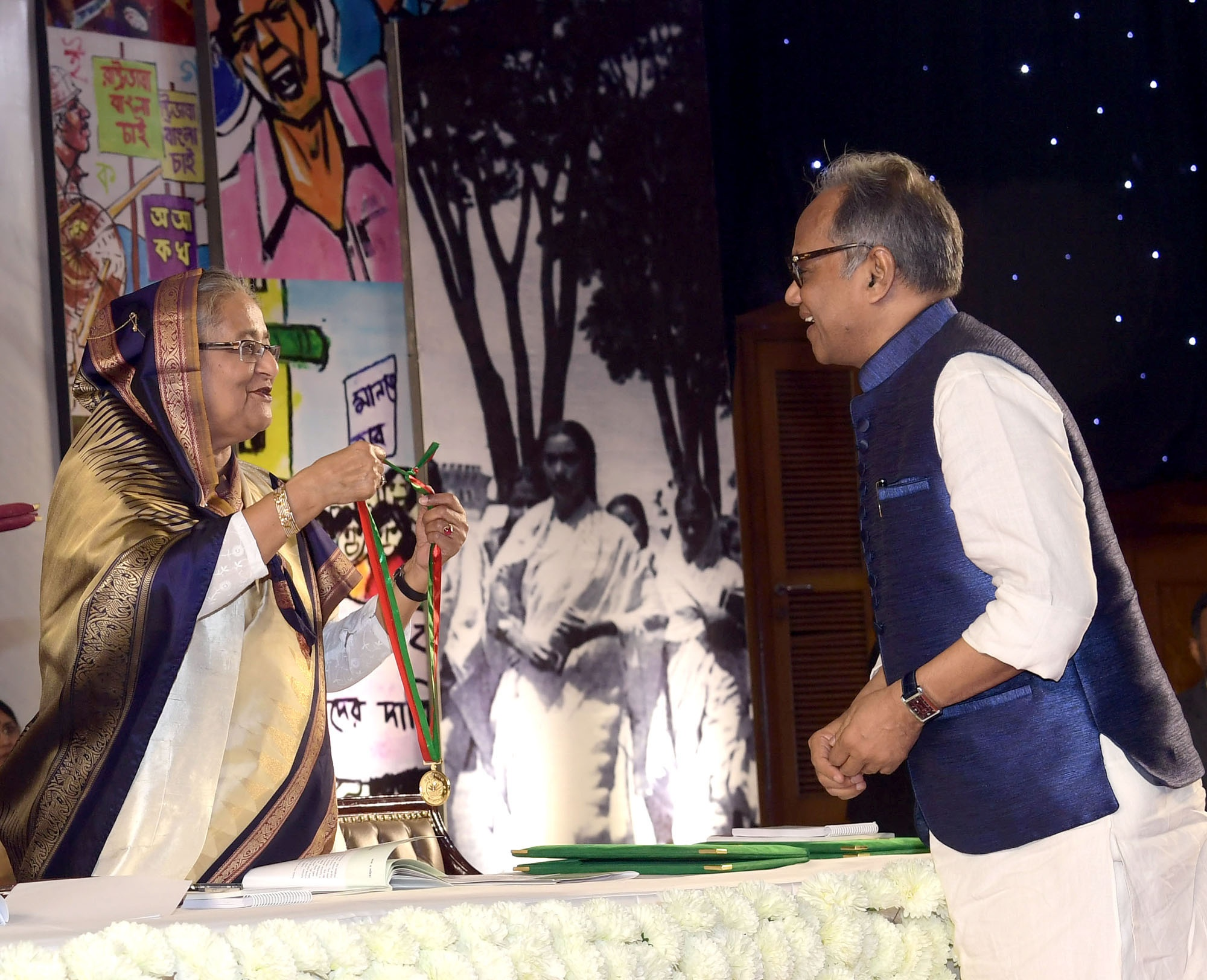
Milan receives Ekushay Padak 2019.

As of February 2019, Milan has published over 200 books.

Romantic

- Bhalobashar Shukh Dukh (1993)

Non-fiction

- Jabojjibon (Lifelong, written in 1976, published in 1990)
- Nodi Upakhyan (The Story of River, 1985)
- Bhumiputro (A Son of the Soil, 1985)
- Kalakal (Proper or Improper Time, 985)
- Poradhinota (Subjugation, 1985)
- Rupnagor (A Place of Love, 1988)
- Rajakartontro (Time of the Collaborators, 1990)

Based on liberation war

- Kalo Ghora (The Black Horse)
- Gherao
- Ekattor O Ekjon Maa (2019)

Historical

- Desh Vager Por (After the division of the country)
- Neta Je Rate Nihoto Holen (The night the leader was assassinated)

Others

- Noorjahan-1
- Noorjahan-2
- O Radha O Krisna (O Radha! O Krisna!) in 1977 (published in 1982)
- Duhkho Kasto (Pains and Sufferings) in 1978 (published in 1982)
- Uponayok (The Second Hero) in 1979 (published in 1990)
- Kon Gramer meye (series BTV Natok) (2009–10)
