= Timeline of the Islamic State (2026) =

2026 ISIS-related events

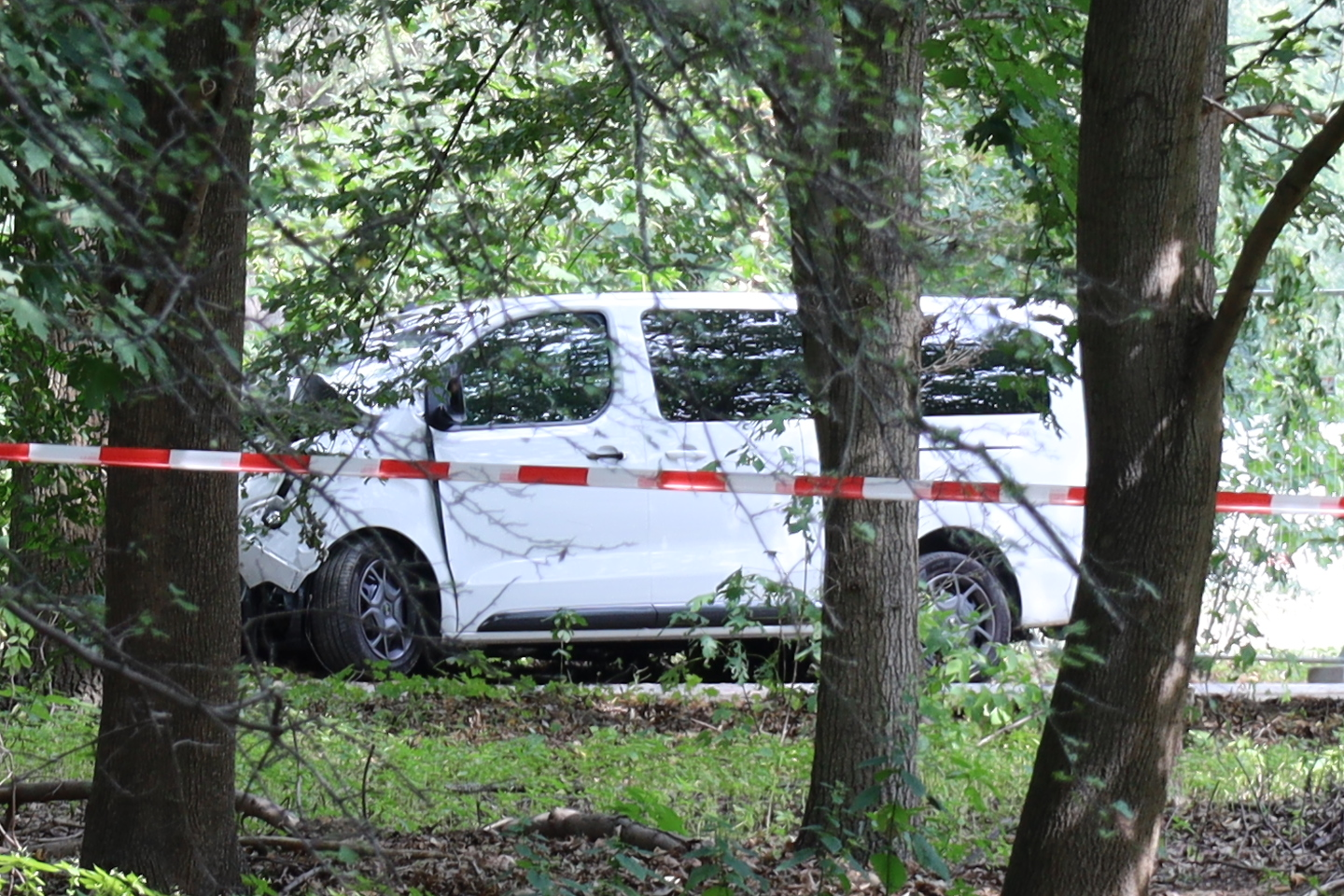
The aftermath of the Berlin Pride attack, in which 21-year-old Lebanese-German Abdul Ballout drove a van into pedestrians during Berlin Christopher Street Day, a Pride celebration in Tiergarten, Berlin, Germany. One woman was killed and 29 people were injured. The attack was notable for its links to IS, as the perpetrator had pledged allegiance to the group.

During 2026, terrorist activity linked to the Islamic State (IS), a Salafi jihadist militant group and unrecognized quasi-state, has fallen to a historical low. This reveals a sharp decline from the group's peak in the 2010s, when it controlled significant territory in Syria and Iraq, managed a large-scale global recruitment network, executed complex attacks abroad, and managed its own economic structures. When compared to the increased activity seen in 2023 and 2024, the number of attacks in 2026 remains substantially lower.

Despite the historic low, IS has still conducted large-scale attacks across the world, including an attack on a Chinese restaurant in Kabul, Afghanistan, an attack on the Diori Hamani International Airport in Niamey, Niger, an attack on a Shia mosque in Islamabad, Pakistan, an attack on the Israeli consulate in Istanbul, Turkey, an attack on a pride parade in Berlin, Germany, an attack on a Church in Jordan, and many other attacks. According to the group's claims, IS allegedly carried out 587 operations worldwide during the first six months of the year, resulting in 2,529 reported deaths and injuries. The group also claimed to have destroyed or damaged 380 military vehicles, captured 56 others, destroyed eight aircraft, and set fire to more than 1,500 civilian homes, as well as dozens of military facilities and churches.

In Asia, the Islamic State – East Asia Province (ISEAP) carried out its first attack since October 2024, an ambush that killed four people; before being subsequently demoted from provincial status in January 2026; meanwhile, following major external operations by the Islamic State – Khorasan Province (ISKP) in Iran and Russia in 2024, military pressure mounted by the Taliban has caused ISKP to shift its strategy from territorial control towards transnational networks. The group remained relatively inactive internationally while continuing to maintain an online presence that incorporates virtual currencies and artificial intelligence in its operations and propaganda activities. Its propaganda was produced in multiple languages and aimed at different audiences, while its recruitment networks extended across Pakistan and other parts of South Asia.

This year also saw Africa consolidate its position as the primary region of IS' activity, with its branches in Nigeria, the Democratic Republic of the Congo (DRC), Mozambique, Somalia, Mali, and Niger accounting for a large proportion of the group's reported attacks and casualties. The Islamic State – Mozambique Province (ISMP) regularly targets churches, local villages, and artisanal mining sites within Cabo Delgado Province, Mozambique, leading to significant civilian displacement; in the nearby DRC, the Allied Democratic Forces (IS), an IS-linked militant group, has also intensified attacks on civilians and expanded there territorial control. In North West Nigeria, the Islamic State – Sahel Province (ISSP) claimed responsibility for two ambushes on Nigerian forces, reportedly killing 19 people, the first time it publicly claimed an attack in the region.

== Timeline ==
Included events include attacks, military operations, arrests, legal actions, propaganda activity, and organizational developments involving IS or IS-aligned groups such as the ADF, Jaysh al-Islam (Army of Islam) in the Gaza Strip, the Bangsamoro Islamic Freedom Fighters (BIFF) in the Philippines, Lakurawa in Nigeria, and other groups across the world.

=== January ===
- 1 January:
  - In Syria, an IS suicide bomber targeted New Year's celebrations killing 1 person and wounding 2 others.
  - In North Kivu, DRC, IS claims responsibility for attacking two Congolese military bases and three Christian-majority villages. In the attack on the bases, two soldiers were killed and the bases were burnt down. In the other attacks, fifteen people were killed and forty homes were burnt down.
- 2 January – In the United States, the FBI foiled a New Year's Eve attack plot targeting a grocery store and fast-food restaurant in North Carolina, authorities say they arrested an IS member.
- 3 January – In Syria, the United Kingdom and France launched airstrikes on an underground arms cache formerly used by the IS.
- 4 January – Eight Nigerian soldiers were killed by an Islamic State – West Africa Province (ISWAP) IED detonation targeting their vehicle near Damasak, Borno State.
- 5 January – In Nigeria, nine Nigerian soldiers were killed and several others were injured when they hit a landmine and came under fire by ISWAP near Bindundul, Borno State.
- 8 January:
  - United States Africa Command (USAFRICOM) forces, in coordination with the Federal Government of Somalia, conducted an airstrike against IS militants in the vicinity of the Golis Mountains, approximately 31 km southeast of Bossaso, Somalia.
  - In Nigeria, 15 Christians are killed by the ISWAP in various raids in North Eastern Nigeria.
- 9 January – In Somalia, USAFRICOM forces, in coordination with the Federal Government of Somalia, conducted an airstrike against IS militants in the vicinity of the Golis Mountains, approximately 33 km southeast of Bossaso, Somalia.
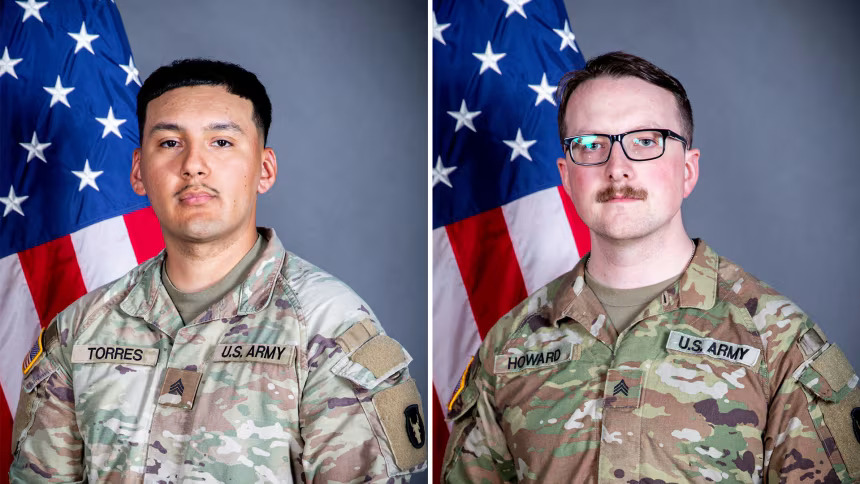
  The victims of the 2025 Palmyra attack.
- 10 January – In Syria, the United States Central Command (CENTCOM) forces, alongside partner forces, conducted multiple airstrike against IS. The strikes are part of Operation Hawkeye Strike, which was launched in direct response to the 2025 Palmyra attack.
- 11 January – USAFRICOM forces, in coordination with the Federal Government of Somalia, conducted an airstrike against IS militants in the vicinity of the Golis Mountains, approximately 27 km southeast of Bossaso, Somalia.
- 14 January – In Nigeria, the Nigerian Air Force launched airstrikes on the 'Timbuktu Triangle' killing 10 militants.
- 16 January – CENTCOM forces conducted a precision airstrike in northwest Syria against a militant leader with direct ties to Al-Qaeda and the IS gunman responsible for the 2025 Palmyra attack.
- 19 January:
  - Seven people are killed and twenty others are injured in a bombing at a Chinese restaurant in Shahr-e Naw, Kabul, Afghanistan. ISKP claimed responsibility.
  - The Syrian Democratic Forces (SDF) says it has lost control of a prison holding thousands of IS fighters in Al-Hasakah Governorate after the prison came under attack from armed groups. A video released by the SDF appears to show dozens of IS militants escaping the prison.
- 20 January:
  - In Nigeria, the military arrested three recruiters for ISWAP in Borno State.
  - Clashes between Boko Haram and ISWAP leave hundreds dead in the Lake Chad.
- 21 January:
  - The 2026 northeastern Syria offensive conducted by the Syrian transitional government against theSDF led to a significant security vacuum, resulting in the escape and mass transfer of 7,000 ISIS detainees. Following the SDF's withdrawal from key facilities such as the al-Hawl and al-Shaddadi prisons.
  - USAFRICOM forces, in coordination with the Federal Government of Somalia, conducted an airstrike against IS militants in the vicinity of the Golis Mountains, approximately 66 km southeast of Bossaso, Somalia.
- 22 January – IS claims responsibility for burning down two Cameroonian military bases in the town of Darak, Logone-et-Chari, Far North Region, Cameroon. IS fighters also seized weaponry.
- 23 January:
  - USAFRICOM forces, in coordination with the Federal Government of Somalia, conducted multiple airstrike against IS militants in the vicinity of the Golis Mountains, approximately 40 km southeast of Bossaso, Somalia.
  - In the Philippines, an ambush by the IS-linked Maute Group kills 4 people.
  - In Mozambique, ISMP stole a motorboat and kidnapped people. ISMP demanded a ransom of 50,000 meticais ($784) each.
  - In the United States, a 17-year-old pleaded guilty for planning a terrorist attack.
- 25 January:
  - Jama'at Nusrat al-Islam wal-Muslimin (JNIM) launched an offensive against the IS in Arbinda, Burkina Faso. IS militants were driven out of the area and four were killed.
  - In Mocímboa da Praia, Mozambique, ISMP abducted the son of a local militia member.
- 26 January – In the DRC, 25 people are killed in an IS-linked attack in eastern DRC.
- 27 January:
  - In Azerbaijan, the State Security Service announced that it foiled an attempt by ISKP to bomb the Israeli embassy in Baku.
  - From 27 January to 2 February, the U.S. conducted five strikes against "multiple" IS targets in Syria, locating and destroying "an IS communication site, critical logistics node, and weapons storage facilities" utilizing "50 precision munitions delivered by fixed-wing, rotary-wing, and unmanned aircraft," according to CENTCOM.
- 28 January:
  - In Singapore, a 14-year old supportive of IS has been issued a restriction order.
  - In Borno State, Nigeria, overnight attacks by ISWAP leave dozens of civilians and soldiers dead.
- 29 January:
  - In Brazil, an IS member is arrested for allegedly planning a suicide attack in the country.
  - The Diori Hamani International Airport is attacked by the IS.
- 30 January:
  - USAFRICOM forces, in coordination with the Federal Government of Somalia, conducted an airstrike against IS militants in the vicinity of the Golis Mountains, approximately 43 km southeast of Bossaso, Somalia.
  - In the Philippines, ISEAP claimed an ambush that killed four soldiers, its first claimed attack since October 2024, before it was subsequently demoted from provincial status in January 2026.

=== February ===
- 1 February:
  - ISSP claimed an attack in Ménaka, Mali.
  - USAFRICOM forces, in coordination with the Federal Government of Somalia, conducted an airstrike against IS militants in the vicinity of the Golis Mountains, approximately 40 km southeast of Bossaso, Somalia.
- 2 February – ISWAP appoints Abu Khalifa as its new commander in the 'Timbuktu Triangle'.
- 3 February – USAFRICOM forces, in coordination with the Federal Government of Somalia, conducted an airstrike against IS militants in the vicinity of the Golis Mountains, approximately 41 km southeast of Bossaso, Somalia.
- 5 February – Jamal Borhot, convicted of joining the IS, is sentenced to 16 years in prison.
- 6 February:
  - The Iraqi Air Force carries out strikes on IS hideouts near Hatra in northern Nineveh Governorate, Iraq, using F-16 fighter jets, killing four militants.
  - An IS suicide bomber detonates explosives at a hideout in Al-Qa'im District, Iraq, during an attempted arrest, killing himself and injuring two security officers.
    Footage of the 2026 Islamabad mosque bombing
  - The Islamic State – Pakistan Province (ISPP) claimed responsibility for 2026 Islamabad mosque bombing through Telegram, releasing a photo purported to show the assailant holding a gun. The attack killed at least 31 people and injured more than 169 others.
  - IS member, Humzah Mashkoor, pleads guilty to terrorism charges.
  - ISSP militants attacked a Nigerien customs office in Kouré, Niger. Two officers were reportedly killed.
- 7 February – Pakistani security forces arrest four suspects involved in the 2026 Islamabad mosque bombing.
- 9 February – In the DRC, IS-linked ADF kill 20 people in eastern DRC.
- 11 February – ISPP launched an English-language magazine called Invade.
- 13 February – USAFRICOM forces, in coordination with the Federal Government of Somalia, conducted an airstrike against IS militants in the vicinity of the Golis Mountains, approximately 50 km southeast of Bossaso, Somalia.
- 14 February – USAFRICOM forces, in coordination with the Federal Government of Somalia, conducted an airstrike against IS militants in the vicinity of the Golis Mountains, approximately 65 km southeast of Bossaso, Somalia.
- 16 February:
  - A 21-year-old IS member is charged with terrorism and other offences for his role in the 2024 Vienna terrorism plot on a Taylor Swift concert in Vienna, Austria, in 2024.
  - USAFRICOM forces, in coordination with the Federal Government of Somalia, conducted an airstrike against IS militants in the vicinity of the Golis Mountains, approximately 70 km southeast of Bossaso, Somalia.
- 17 February – 4 IS members are arrested by the Israel Defense Forces (IDF) in Jericho in the West Bank.
- 18 February – A security officer is killed and another is injured in an attack by IS in Raghib, Deir ez-Zor Governorate, Syria.
- 19 February – In the DRC, ISCAP claims responsibility for the killing of three Congolese soldiers.
- 21 February:
  - IS claims responsibility for two attacks on security personnel in northern and eastern Syria, in which a soldier and a civilian were killed.
  - ISWAP begins the so-called "Ramadan offensive" against Nigerian security forces.
- 22 February – In Nigeria, the Nigerian Army kills 25 ISWAP fighters.
- 23 February:
  - The Syrian interior ministry reports that four security personnel and an assailant were killed in an attack claimed to involve the IS at a checkpoint in Raqqa.
  - Nigerian Army troops kill five suspected Lakurawa insurgents near Mayama Hill, Kebbi State, Nigeria, and recover a cache of weapons.
- 24 February – In Russia, the IS claimed a suicide bombing that killed 1 person and injured 3 more.
- 27 February – 25 Nigerien militiamen were killed in a suspected IS ambush near Tillaberi, western Niger.
- 28 February – In Tora Bora, Afghanistan, ten IS militants are killed by an Afghan strike.

=== March ===
- 3–14 March: Nigerian Army soldiers and a local imam are killed and several others are injured in two separate attacks by ISWAP militants on army bases in Gwoza, Borno State, Nigeria. 9 soldiers and the local imam in Ngoshe town and 5 soldiers Pulka.
- 5 March:
  - ISWAP fighters launched attacks against Nigerian military positions in Konduga, Marte, Jakana, and Mainok in Borno State.
  - A vehicle-borne suicide bomber belonging to ISWAP detonated an explosive device a Nigerian Army camp.
- 6 March – In Malaysia, six people were arrested on terrorism charges linked to the IS.
- 7 March – In Pakistan, ISPP gunmen kill a Hazara Shia man in Quetta, Balochistan.
- 8 March:
  - USAFRICOM forces, in coordination with the Federal Government of Somalia, conducted an airstrike against IS militants in the vicinity of the Golis Mountains, approximately 70 km southeast of Bossaso, Somalia.
  - Dawlah Islamiyah-Hassan faction's "emir" was killed in an encounter near Barangay Tinimbacan, Banisilan, Cotabato.
  - As part of the "Ramadan Offensive" in Nigeria, ISWAP militants launched major attacks on three military camps in Goniri, Yobe State, and Kukawa and Dalwa, Borno State. Other ISWAP units carried out diversionary attacks in Marte and Doron Baga.
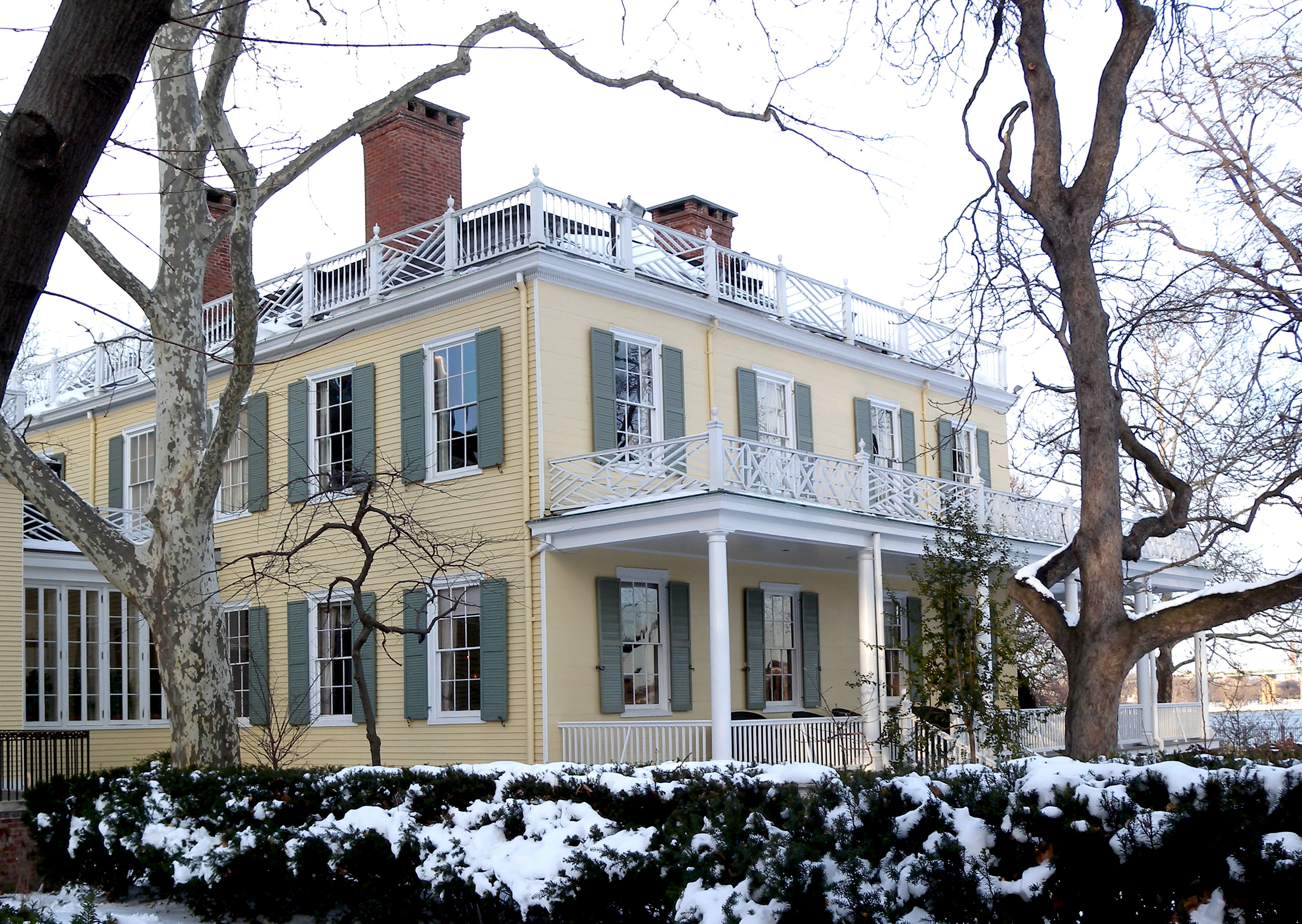
    The Gracie Mansion
- 9 March:
  - In New York City, an attempted bombing took place outside of Gracie Mansion. Two men, Ibrahim Kayumi and Emir Balat, allegedly attempted to detonate two bombs in a crowd of people protesting the Iran War. Both bombs failed to detonate. Investigators say they were inspired by the IS and wanted the incident to be deadlier than the 2013 Boston Marathon bombing.
  - In Niger, ISSP targeted Tahoua’s military airport, also known as Base 401, where Niger’s TB2 drones were stationed. The attack damaged two drones and destroyed the facility’s control station.
  - In Niger, ISSP launched an attack against military barracks in Tahoua. Locals referred to the barracks as the “American base”, as it had previously been used by the United States to train Nigerien special forces until 2024.
- 11 March:
  - Attackers from the Islamic State – Central Africa Province (ISCAP) claimed to have killed seven FARDC Soldiers during an attack on the Muchacha mine in the eastern Ituri Province. They burned buildings, stole weapons and killed 17 civilians in the village of Muchacha.
  - A Lakurawa fighter was executed by his own comrades for the rape of a 10-year-old girl in Sitti village, Tangaza, Sokoto state.
- 12 March – 36-year-old Mohamed Bailor Jalloh, opened fire on a Reserve Officers' Training Corps (ROTC) group. The perpetrator was an IS supporter.
- 14 March – In the DRC, IS militants ambushed and killed seven soldiers as they were traveling to Mambasa.
- 16 March:
  - USAFRICOM forces, in coordination with the Federal Government of Somalia, conducted airstrikes against IS militants in the vicinity of the Golis Mountains, approximately 45 km southeast of Bossaso, Somalia.
  - In the Philippines, 3 members of BIFF and Dawlah Islamiyah surrender.
- 17 March:
  - In India, a 19-year-old student allegedly linked to IS was arrested by the Uttar Pradesh Anti-Terrorism Squad.
  - In the DRC, ISCAP claimed an attack on the Congolese army near Bandegaido, Ituri Province.
- 18 March:
  - Over 60 Boko Haram and ISWAP insurgents are killed in an operation by the Nigerian Army in Abadam, Borno State, Nigeria.
  - USAFRICOM forces, in coordination with the Federal Government of Somalia, conducted airstrikes against IS militants in the vicinity of the Golis Mountains, approximately 65 km southeast of Bossaso, Somalia.
- 20 March – Polish defence minister Władysław Kosiniak-Kamysz announces the withdrawal of Polish Armed Forces from Iraq, stationed there as part of the CJTF–OIR joint task force against the IS, citing the regional threat from Iran.
- 23 March – In the DRC, IS militants withdrew from the Muchacha mine in the eastern Ituri Province after they attacked and occupied it since 11 March, the death toll rose to 67.
- 24 March:
  - In Morocco and Spain, 3 suspected IS members were arrested in coordinated raids.
  - In Nigeria, IS insurgents kill nine Nigerian troops, one police officer and a civilian during attacks in Kebbi State, Nigeria.
- 25 March – In Melbourne, Australia, a teen was arrested for owning an IS flag and extremist manuals.
- 31 March:
  - In response to United States sanctions, Rwanda threatened to stop fighting the IS in Mozambique.
  - 27 civilians had their throats slit by ISWAP militants in a mass execution in a forest outside the town of Mafa, northeastern Nigeria.
  - 11 people were killed in an ISWAP raid on Kautikeri village outside the town of Chibok.

=== April ===
- 2 April:
  - The IS-linked ADF kill 43 people in attack on Bafwakoa, DRC.
  - In an editorial, IS condemned Israel's law that allows the execution of Palestinian prisoners, and the execution of Muslim detainees without due process in Iraqi prisons.
- 4 April – In Nigeria, at least 38 people were killed by IS attacks.
- 7 April:
  - Three suspected IS members opened fire next to the Israeli Consulate building in Istanbul. One of the attackers was killed by a General Directorate of Security officer. Two perpetrators were injured and captured, and two policemen were injured. Nine people were detained in connection with the attack.
  - In a nationwide operation, Turkey arrested nearly 200 IS suspects in response to the 2026 attack on Israeli consulate in Istanbul.
- 13 April – The French court found Lafarge guilty of financing terrorist groups in Syria, by paying millions of euros to the IS and al-Nusra Front between 2013 and 2014. The court also convicted several former executives involved in the scheme.
- 12 April:
  - An IS-inspired arson attack occurred at a synagogue in Skopje, North Macedonia.
  - In Pakistan, ISPP gunmen opened fire on Shia Hazara vegetable vendors in Quetta, Balochistan, killing four people and injuring several others.
- 15 April:
  - ISWAP killed at least five people in an attack in Askira Uba Local Government Area, Borno state.
  - Three suspected suppliers linked to ISWAP and Boko Haram were arrested.
- 16 April:
  - Ashraf al-Safoo, a member of the IS' Khattab Media Foundation is found guilty and sentenced to 25 years in prison.
  - ISWAP claims to have executed two sorcerers in Borbor and Bama in Borno State, Nigeria.
  - The United States fully completed their withdrawal from Syria when American troops evacuated the Qasrak air base in Hasakah province, ending the United States' military intervention in Syria after troops first arrived in 2015 to fight against the IS militant group.
- 17 April:
  - In the Philippines, ten members of Dawlah Islamiyah are killed in a joint operation.
  - In Nigeria, ISWAP attacks the a military base in Mussa village killing at least 5 soldiers.
  - USAFRICOM forces, in coordination with the Federal Government of Somalia, conducted an airstrike against IS militants in the vicinity of the Golis Mountains, approximately 50 km southeast of Bossaso, Somalia.
- 18 April – In Ethiopia, 138 militants linked to IS and Al-Shabaab are arrested by Ethiopia's National Intelligence and Security Service.
- 20 April:
  - Ugandan and Congolese forces rescue at least 200 civilians being held by the IS-linked ADF.
  - In Turkey, 90 IS members are arrested.
  - Following a reenactment of the IS-inspired Bondi Beach attack, a 22-year-old man was sentenced to a maximum of 12 months in jail, with nine being served without the option for parole. He could be seen on the same pedestrian walkbridge as where the attack had taken place, four months prior to his sentencing. He was seen posing to mimic as if he was holding a rifle and shooting, meanwhile shouting rhetoric like: "Fuck the Jews", and statements like "What the fuck are you looking at?" to a passerby with his family.
  - USAFRICOM forces, in coordination with the Federal Government of Somalia, conducted a series of airstrikes against IS militants in the vicinity of the Golis Mountains, approximately 90 km southeast of Bossaso, Somalia.
- 21 April – Mohammad Sharifullah's trial begins on 21 April 2026, he is accused of aiding the deadly 2021 Kabul airport attack.
- 22 April – A resident of Ottawa, Canada is found guilty of terror charges related to an IS-inspired terrorist plot against Jewish people.
- 23 April:
  - Senior ISWAP commander identified as Abu Umar Bundi Munzir is killed alongside 24 other militants in Borno State, Nigeria.
  - The IS releases The Sydney Attack: The Revenge of the Oppressed Ummah which encourages supporters to replicate the 2025 Bondi Beach attack.
- 24 April – The IS released a video showing Christian captives paying Jizya. After they paid, the captives were released.
- 25 April – USAFRICOM forces, in coordination with the Federal Government of Somalia, conducted a series of airstrikes against IS militants in the vicinity of the Golis Mountains, approximately 75 km southeast of Bossaso, Somalia.
- 26 April:
  - 12 Christians are killed in an ISWAP attack on a village in Adamawa State, Nigeria.
  - ISWAP attacked football pitch in Guyaku, Adamawa State, killing about 30 people.
  - USAFRICOM forces, in coordination with the Federal Government of Somalia, conducted a series of airstrikes against IS militants in the vicinity of the Golis Mountains, approximately 75 km southeast of Bossaso, Somalia.
- 28 April:
  - Malian and Russian troops withdrew from Labbezanga in the Gao Region, a border post on the Mali–Niger border, which was subsequently occupied by ISSP members. ISSP also began amassing forces around Ménaka, the capital of the Ménaka Region, and launched probing attacks on military positions around the city.
  - ISKP attacks a Pakistani intelligence officer in the town of Khansar, leading to his death.
- 29 April – Reuters reported that Ménaka, Mali was under government control and that ISSP militants had retreated from the town.
- 30 April:
  - Insurgents attacked and destroyed the historic St. Louis de Montfort Church in Mesa, Cabo Delgado Province, Mozambique.
  - In North Macedonia, seven people are arrested in connection to an IS-inspired arson attack that occurred at a synagogue in Skopje, North Macedonia.

=== May ===
- 1 May:
  - ISMP claimed responsibility for the attack on St. Louis de Montfort Church in Mesa, Cabo Delgado Province, Mozambique.
  - In Damascus, Syria, IS assassinated Shi'ite cleric Sheikh Farhan Hassan al-Mansour, Imam and preacher of the Sayyidah Zaynab shrine.
- 3 May:
  - Four Palestinians are charged for planning IS-inspired attacks in Israel.
  - Puntland regional officials say that they have recaptured the Miraale area following clashes with IS members.
- 4 May:
  - The Islamic State – Iraq Province (ISIP) claimed an attack against the Iraqi military, its first attack in 2026.
  - USAFRICOM forces, in coordination with the Federal Government of Somalia, conducted an airstrike against IS militants in the vicinity of the Golis Mountains, approximately 75 km southeast of Bossaso, Somalia.
- 6 May – USAFRICOM forces, in coordination with the Federal Government of Somalia, conducted an airstrike against IS militants in the vicinity of the Golis Mountains, approximately 75 km southeast of Bossaso, Somalia.
- 7 May – Three women that joined the IS are arrested in Australia.
- 8 May:
  - Forty people are killed and homes are burned by the IS-linked ADF during attacks in North Kivu and Ituri Province, DRC.
  - Four Melbourne men are charged after allegedly accessing and distributing IS propaganda online following an Australian Federal Police investigation.
- 9 May – Nigerian troops repelled an attack by ISWAP on the 27th Brigade in Buni Gari, Yobe State, the battle left 50 ISWAP insurgents dead.
- 11 May:
  - A 27-year-old man suspected of plotting an attack and joining the IS in Syria or Mozambique is arrested.
  - IS claimed responsibility for an attack on a Syrian army bus in Al-Hasakah, in eastern Syria, in which six Syrian soldiers were killed.
- 12 May:
  - The United States warned of the IS spreading in West Africa, the Sahel, the Lake Chad Basin, Mozambique, Sudan, and Somalia.
  - After three Australian women linked to IS were arrested after returning to Australia, was met with anger from people living in the Al-Roj refugee camp . One women inside the Al-Roj refugee camp said it was "not good" and called them "our sisters".
- 13 May:
  - In Turkey, 324 suspected IS members are detained in nationwide sweeps.
  - In Nigeria, troops seized 400 Starlink devices allegedly used by Boko Haram and ISWAP terrorists, while killing more than 250 insurgents.
- 14 May:
  - In Nigeria, two suspected ISWAP fighters are killed in an ambush near Bazamri, Borno State.
  - In Nigeria, two suspected ISWAP logistics operatives are arrested in Yobe State.
- 15 May – In Nigeria, U.S. president Donald Trump announced that U.S. and Nigerian forces eliminated IS second-in-command Abu-Bilal al-Minuki during a joint mission.
- 16 May:
  - Six members of ISWAP were killed after an IED detonated prematurely in Marte Local Government Area, Borno State.
  - A Melbourne man is charged after allegedly accessing and distributing IS propaganda online following an Australian Federal Police investigation which saw four other men charged on 8 May 2026.
- 17 May:
  - United States and Nigeria carried airstrikes on ISWAP targets in the North East region. No United States or Nigerian forces were harmed in the offensive, however at least 20 militants were killed.
  - ISMP insurgents claim to have killed 27 members of the Naparama ethnic militia in the forest of Katapua, after setting fire on the entire village of Messanje, Chiúre, Mozambique.
  - Three civilians are killed and another three abducted when a group of ISMP militants attacked Pundanhar, Palma, Mozambique.
- 18 May – In Tanzania, three Kenyans are arrested for attempting to join ISMP in Mozambique.
- 19 May:
  - In Turkey, 110 suspected IS members are detained, mainly in Istanbul.
  - The United States and Nigeria launched their third round of airstrikes.
  - The Nigerian Defence Headquarters confirmed that around 175 ISWAP and Boko Haram militants have been killed since the joint operations began.
  - IS-linked militants killed 17 people in the Alima village in Ituri, during the time of the attack Ituri was in the midst of an Ebola outbreak.
  - ISMP fighters raid Namoro locality, Chiúre, killing one "infidel", and burned a church as well as other structures.
- 20 May:
  - AFRICOM says that United States and Nigerian forces launched airstrikes on an ISWAP camp in Nigeria.
  - Three Georgians are sarrested for joining the IS in Panski Gorge.
  - Five fishing boats are seized by ISMP militants near Pangane.
- 21 May:
- In Canada, the Royal Canadian Mounted Police arrested Ali Ben Chaoua, a man who posted TikToks in support of the IS.
- 21 May – An alleged "Christian fighter" is killed by suspected ISMP insurgents.
- 23 May – The Syrian General Intelligence Directorate and the Turkish National Intelligence Organization conduct a joint operation in Syria and arrest ten people allegedly linked with IS.
- 24 May – ISMP militants kill at least two civilians on a violent attack in Muanona village, Namuno District, Mozambique. Forty houses and 13 shops were set on fire and immediately displaced dozens of families. Thirteen motorcycles were also stolen, as well as looting and destroying food supplies.
- 26 May – In Germany, two people are charged with IS membership.
- 27 May – Clashes between ISMP and state forces kill one Mozambican soldier.
- 28 May:
  - The Melbourne Magistrates' Court in Victoria, Australia, charges 34-year-old IS bride Rayann El Houli, who recently returned from Syria, for being a member of a terrorist organization after joining the IS after traveling there in the early 2010s.
  - Three people are injured in a mass stabbing at a train station in Winterthur, Switzerland. Police said that the perpetrator had been identified in 2015 for spreading IS and faced criminal charges for his IS support.
  - In North West Nigeria, ISSP claimed responsibility for two attacks on the Nigerian Army.

=== June ===
- 1 June – United States and Nigerian forces launched airstrikes that killed 21 ISWAP fighters in Borno State.
- 2 June:
  - In Italy, a 21-year-old Moroccan man is arrested for allegedly planning an IS-inspired terrorist attack.
  - Popular Mobilization Forces in Nineveh announce that three IS suspects have been killed during a military operation in the Al-Ba'aj District.
- 3 June:
  - In the DRC, IS militants kill 16 people in the village of Mbau.
  - In the DRC, IS militants kill 21 Christians in Biakato, Mambassa Territory, Ituri province.
  - IS celebrates Eid al-Adha in ISCAP territory.
- 4 June:
  - IS threatens Pope Leo XIV prior to his trip to Spain.
  - It is reported that the 2026 Ebola epidemic in the DRC has spread to IS-controlled Mambasa Territory. The epidemic has so far only killed one person under IS-control.
- 5 June – In the United States, three men are arrested for allegedly funding IS drone attacks.
- 7 June – ISSP releases photos showing its operations during Eid al-Adha.
- 9 June – In Kosovo, three people are arrested for funding IS with cryptocurrency.
- 10 June – In Kyrgzstan, 31 suspected members of IS and Katibat al-Tawhid wal-Jihad (KTJ) are arrested for planning attacks in the country.
- 15 June – In Syria, a security member is killed in an IS attack in Raqqa.
- 17 June – In North Macedonia, five people are arrested for forming an online terrorist network inspired by IS.
- 21 June – In Iraq, the Iraq's Joint Operations Command conducted strikes on IS in Anbar Province.
- 24 June – In Northwestern Syria, an Americans airstrike killed Ali Husayn al-Ulaywi, a senior member of the IS.
- 30 June:
  - Amid the FIFA World Cup, IS and Al-Qaeda flags are allegedly spotted in Dhaka, Bangladesh.
  - In Pakistan, Afghanistan's Ministry of Defense allegedly struck ISKP positions Pakistan.

=== July ===
- 1 July – A report released by the Observatory for Religious Freedom in Africa reveals that 79,323 people have been killed and another 34,773 have been kidnapped by ISWAP and Boko Haram militants from 2020–2025 in Nigeria.
- 3 July – Following a recent operation against IS militants in Nigeria, the United States withdrew most of its deployed forces while continuing to provide intelligence support to Nigeria at the request of its government.
- 4 July – In Kirkuk, Iraq, security forces ambush and kill a suspected IS member.
- 6 July – In Morocco, Morocco's counterterrorism agency foils an attack and arrests 10 IS militants.
- 7 July – Two explosive devices exploded near the Four Seasons Hotel Damascus, killing a person and wounding 36 more. The attacks occurred during the state visit of Emmanuel Macron there.
- 9 July:
  - In India, the National Investigation Agency launched coordinated raids at 20 locations across the country, targeting an alleged network involving IS and Al-Qaeda in the Indian Subcontinent (AQIS).
  - The Syrian Ministry of Interior announced the arrest of all members of a cell accused of carrying out the Damascus bombings during French President Emmanuel Macron's visit. Syrian Interior Minister Anas Khattab and Rif Dimashq internal security commander Ahmed al-Dalati said that security forces had conducted coordinated raids in Damascus and its countryside, including areas such as al-Qutayfah, Sayyidah Zaynab, Qudsaya, and Ash al-Warwar, and had captured an IS-linked cell they claimed were responsible for the attacks.
- 10 July:
  - A cholera outbreak kills nine ISWAP militants in the Timbuktu Triangle, a stronghold of the group in Borno State.
  - Two other ISWAP fighters were executed after being infected with cholera.
  - In Spain, 4 people, including a women, are arrested by the Spanish police for IS links.
- 13 July – The Armed Forces of the Philippines launch a military operation against the ISEAP, BIFF, and election-related violence.
- 14 July – Iran reports the hanging of two members of IS that were captured in a hideout in the Bamo District after an operation that resulted in several militants and three members of the Islamic Revolutionary Guard Corps being killed.
- 18 July – In Turkey, authorities arrest 119 people linked to IS.
- 19 July:
  - In Iraq, two IS militants are captured in Kirkuk.
  - In Nigeria, the army and police allegedly prevented a mass abduction after engaging ISWAP fighters at a student hostel in Monguno, rescuing all 46 occupants. However, Nigeria's Federal Ministry of Education dismissed the reports as false.
  - In the Philippines, BIFF militants are blamed for two grenade attacks in the Bangsamoro Autonomous Region in Muslim Mindanao.
  - In the Philippines, three BIFF fighters were injured in a skirmish with soldiers in Talitay, Maguindanao del Norte.
  - In Segev Shalom, Israel, a 20-year-old is arrested for having links to IS.
- 21 July – The Iraqi military say that they have destroyed six IS hideouts in Kirkuk, Iraq.
- 25 July – An IS-linked vehicle-ramming attack occurred during Berlin Christopher Street Day, a pride celebration in the Tiergarten in central Berlin, Germany. One woman was killed and 29 people were injured, several critically. The perpetrator fled on foot, and a large-scale manhunt was launched. The perpetrator pledged allegiance to IS.
- 26 July:
  - The perpetrator of the IS-inspired 2026 Berlin Pride attack was shot and killed by the SEK during an attempted arrest in Spandau.
  - The perpetrator of the 2026 Berlin Pride attack is praised by IS supporters.
- 27 July:
  - At least 31 civilians are left dead after ADF attacks in the DRC.
  - Three members of the Internal Security Forces were injured following an attack by IS using explosive devices, in Al-Baghuz Fawqani, Syria.
- 28 July:
  - A 30-year-old man from Houston, Texas pleaded guilty to sharing IS propaganda.
  - In Lebanon, a man is arrested for transferring half a million United States dollars to IS in Syria.
  - Law enforcement working with Jalloh, the perpetrator of the IS-inspired 2026 Old Dominion University shooting, failed to provide Jalloh's ties with IS to the Old Dominion University.
  - In Iraq, the Counter Terrorism Service arrested an IS commander near Baghdad, known by the alias "Abu Nour".
- 29 July:
  - In Syria, seven people affiliated with IS were arrested by the Internal Security Forces in security operations targeting two cells in Aleppo, Azaz and Al-Bab.
  - In Iraq, six IS members, including the self-proclaimed "Governor of Anbar" were sentenced to death by hanging.
  - In Nigeria, two suspected ISWAP collaborators are arrested in Borno State.
  - Two men from Essex County, New Jersey plead guilty to aiding IS.
  - A man from Washington pleaded guilty for attempting to aid IS.
  - In Nigeria, clashes took place between Boko Haram and ISWAP around Mangari and Tumbun Allura, Boko Haram seized two boats and killed several ISWAP fighters before withdrawing.
- 31 July:
  - In Dier ez-Zor, Syria, five members of an IS cell are arrested.
  - In Germany, a Syrian man accused of being a former-IS police man is arrested.
  - In Afghanistan, ISKP claims responsibility for assassinating a Taliban official.

=== August ===
- 2 August – The Afghanistan United Front announced the beginning of its armed struggle against the Taliban, al-Qaeda, IS, and the Pakistani Taliban.
- 2 August – The IDF confirms that they have killed Alaa Imad Khamis Tarams, a Jaysh al-Islam (Army of Islam) militant in Gaza City. Jaysh al-Islam has been a part of Islamic State – Sinai Province since 2015.
- 3 August – In Bergen op Zoom, Netherlands, a person is arrested for attempting to join ISKP in Afghanistan.
- 4 August:
  - An attack by IS-linked Lakurawa militants results in the death of 3 people, including a police officer in Kebbi State, Nigeria.
  - In Kampala, Uganda, nine members of ISCAP are convicted for a kidnapping in 2018.
- 6 August:
  - In Germany, two former IS fighters from Iraq are arrested.
  - As of August 6, it has been three months since the last United States airstrike Somalia.
  - In the Philippines, five members of Dawlah Islamiyah are killed in an operation in Cotabato.
- 7 August:
  - In Nigeria, troops apprehended four IS-linked Lakurawa members while they were selling cows at a village market in Gudu Local Government Area, Sokoto State.
  - In Syria, two IS members were neutralized by the Internal Security Forces after attempting to plant an explosive device in Sayyidah Zaynab.
- 8 August:
  - In the DRC, the IS-linked ADF attacked a village, burning and looting several homes, leaving 13 dead people.
  - The Government of Maharashtra in India, bans 114 literature linked to IS and Al-Qaeda, including Voice of Khurasan.
- 9 August:
  - In Nigeria, an airstrike by the Nigerian Air Force leaves nine ISWAP militants dead, including a senior commander.
  - In Italy, police arrested a 16-year-old boy for possessing neo-Nazi and IS propaganda.
  - In Nigeria, ISWAP burned a Nigerian military base and 18 military vehicles.
- 10 August:
  - In Iraq, the Iraqi Air Force launched airstrikes and destroyed eight IS hideouts in Kirkuk.
  - In Nigeria, troops foiled an attack by ISWAP on a military base in Gajiram, Nganzai Local Government Area of Borno State.
  - Near the Israeli-Syria border, Syrian authorities announced that they had dismantled a nine-member IIS-linked cell in Khan Arnabah, Quneitra.
- 11 August – In Switzerland, a Swiss-Turkish nineteen-year-old is arrested for planning an IS-inspired stabbing attack.
- 12 August:
  - In Kuwait, the Ministry of Interior says it foiled an IS attack plot.
  - In Colorado, a man pleaded guilty for attempting to join IS.
  - Iraqi officials announced that United States forces will fully withdraw from Iraq on September 30, 2026.
- 13 August – In Nigeria, the Nigerian Armed Forces launch an offensive against IS-linked Lakurawa militants in North West Nigeria.
- 14 August:
  - In Germany, two suspected IS members are arrested.
  - Kevin Rideout, an American Christian missionary who was taken hostage by ISSP in the Sahel region of Africa is released after 9 months in captivity.
    The Government of National Stability controls eastern Libya.
  - The leader of the de facto Government of National Stability in Libya, Khalifa Haftar, reportedly was involved in the release of Rideout.
  - In Nigeria, a gun battle between IS-linked Lakurawa militants and local residents of Sokoto killed 32 civilians, 4 Nigerian soldiers and 13 militants. The militants also set fire to seven houses, two shops and three vehicles.
- 15 August:
  - Three IS members were arrested in Iraq, two in Diyala Governorate and one in Al-Anbar Governorate.
  - The Syrian General Intelligence Service reported the arrest of a prominent IS leader, but without revealing his identity or position.
  - The IS-affiliated Amaq News Agency released a video showing ISWAP militants attacking a Nigerian military base in Borno State, Nigeria.
- 16 August:
  - In Zamfara State, Nigeria, at least 40 members of the IS-linked Lakurawa are killed by Nigerian troops.
  - In Sokoto State, Nigeria, IS-linked Lakurawa militants killed 2 people.
  - In Arizona, United States, a congressman is attempting to rename a portion of an interstate highway after two Arizonians killed by IS.
- 17 August:
  - An explosion is reported at a school in the Dashte Barchi neighborhood of Kabul, Afghanistan, injuring several people.
  - A man from Castle Rock, Colorado pleaded guilty for attempting to join IS.
  - In Kirkuk, Iraq, the Iraqi Air Force claims to have destroyed 5 IS hideouts.
- 18 August:
  - According to the Taliban-led government in Afghanistan, IS is allegedly behind the explosion at a school yesterday.
  - In Israel, a 20-year-old man is charged for planning to carry out an IS-inspired terrorist attack.
  - In northern Syria, Hamza Abdullah Muhammad (nom de guerre Abu Jihad al-Muhajir), the military leader of Islamic State – Syria Province was captured during a security operation.
  - In Nigeria, the Nigerian Armed Forces captured three ISWAP militants and rescued a Cameroonian hostage held by ISWAP.
  - An IS-linked Turkish national that was deported from the Netherlands reportedly has joined IS in Somalia.
  - In Sulaymaniyah, Kurdistan Region, Iraq, seven members of IS are arrested.
  - In the United Kingdom, 22-year-old Mohamed Mohamoud pleaded guilty for attempting to join IS.
- 19 August:
  - The Reserve Bank of India has amended IS and Al-Qaeda sanctions.
  - In Borno State, Nigeria, an airstrike launched by the Nigerian Air Force kills 8 ISWAP militants.
  - IS-affiliated Al-‘Adiyat Foundation releases multiple English-language posters.
  - In Iraq, two members of IS are arrested in Mosul and Saladin Governorate.
- 20 August:
  - In Nigeria, the Nigerian Armed Forces free 39 hostages held by ISWAP, kill an ISWAP insurgent, and capture other ISWAP fighters.
  - In Albany, New York, United States, a 35-year-old is arrested for planning to bomb the New York State Capitol building in an IS-inspired terrorist attack.
  - In Finland, a women is arrested for trafficking her children to IS-controlled territory in Syria in 2014.
  - The Democratic Autonomous Administration of North and East Syria, which helped fight against IS in Syria, officially dissolves itself.
- 22 August – Eight members of IS are arrested in Urfa, Turkey.
- 23 August:
  - The IDF's Duvdevan Unit says that they have arrested four Palestinians over the weekend, including two affiliated with IS.
  - Baa Shuwa, an ISWAP commander, ordered the execution of a Shura Council member for alleged defiance.
  - Several Boko Haram fighters are reportedly killed in clashes with ISWAP in the Sambisa Forest area of Borno State, with fighting reported around the Zarmari, Bula Daloye and Chirchor enclaves.
  - In Borno State, Nigeria, 25 ISWAP militants, including 3 senior commanders are killed after clashes near Mandaragirau.
  - In Saladin Governorate, Iraq the Popular Mobilization Forces successfully repelled an attack by IS.
  - In Borno State, Nigeria, airstrikes by the Nigerian Air Force destroy two ISWAP gun trucks.
- 25 August:
  - The Kurdish-led SDF officially dissolves itself.
  - In Turkey, 40 suspected IS members are arrested across the country.
- 26 August:
  - The Iraqi government announces that the German military intervention against IS in Iraq has officially concluded.
  - The United States Department of State announced a reward of $8 million for information on Shahab al-Muhajir, the current leader of ISKP.
- 27 August – In Borno State, Nigeria, airstrikes by the Nigerian Air Force kills 8 ISWAP militants and destroys 12 boats.
- 28 August – In Israel, two IS-inspired teens are indicated for planning attacks on the Temple Mount and an IDF base.
- 31 August:
  - In Poland, a 20-year-old is indicated over an IS-inspired attack on a Christmas market.
  - In India, a second Islamic State – Hind Province (ISHP) member is sentenced to seven years in prison.

=== September ===
- 1 September:
  - Abu Hudhayfah al-Ansari, the spokesperson for IS, is killed during a security operation.
  - In Iraq, the First Karkh Investigation Court completed its interrogation of more than 5,700 IS members.
- 2 September:
  - In Israel, a former IDF soldier, Khamis Su’ad, is arrested for allegedly supporting the IS.
  - In Borno State, Nigeria two ISWAP militants surrender to the Nigerian Army.
- 3 September:
  - In Iraq, an IS member is sentenced to 15 years in prison for planning to attack Arba'in pilgrims.
  - ISMP claimed responsibility for separate attacks on a Christian tourist site and a police station near Marangira, Niassa Province, Mozambique. The attacks reportedly destroyed the site, seized two vehicles, and injured a police officer.
- 4 September – In Turkey, a 21-year-old suspect linked to IS opened fire on Turkish police during an operation in the Sultanbeyli district of Istanbul. Police returned fire, killing the suspect, while a civilian was wounded in the exchange and later died in hospital.
- 8 September:
  - The United Nations announces that Puntland's counter-terrorism operations have successfully weakened ISSP's insurgency.
  - In Israel, a 19-year-old teen is indicated for allegedly pledging allegiance to IS.
  - In Borno State, Nigeria, the Nigerian Armed Forces and the Civilian Joint Task Force (CJTF) repel an attack on a military base in Pulka.
  - In France, three suspected IS supporters are arresting for planning attacks on the Jewish community.
  - In Pakistan, Khurshid Pandrani Raisani, an alleged intelligence informant, was killed by ISPP militants in the Kank Ziarat area of Mastung District in Balochistan.
- 9 September – In Saladin Governorate, Iraq, the Iraqi Air Force carried out 4 airstrikes on IS hideouts. After the strikes, Iraqi troops launched a search operation in the area.
- 10 September – In Pakistan, a shootout between ISKP militants and the Counter Terrorism Department occurred on the border between Peshawar and Nowshera districts, killing five people, including an ISKP commander.
- 11 September:
  - In Kirkuk, Iraq, two IS militants are killed in an airstrike.
  - On the 25th anniversary of the September 11th attacks, the IS-linked al-Naba magazine releases an Arabic-language article saying that its conflict with the United States is “far from over”.
  - In Mozambique, ISMP said it was responsible for an attack on the Coutada de Marangira concession in the Niassa Special Reserve. The assault resulted in at least one death, the displacement of about 2,700 people, and the abduction of 11 others.
  - The Sinjar Resistance Units, which was formed as a response to the IS-led Yazidi Genocide, has officially been disarmed and integrated into Iraqi security forces.
- 13 September – In Kurdistan Region, Iraq, 22 members of IS, including an "emir" were arrested.
- 14 September:
  - In Borno and Adamawa, Nigeria, troops rescue eight hostages and arrest six ISWAP members.
  - In Kebbi State, Nigeria, troops killed several members of the IS-linked Lakurawa and seize there weapons.
  - In Pennsylvania, United States, a 21-year-old man is arrested after pledging allegiance to IS and planning a mass casualty event.
    Footage of the 2021 Kabul airport attack
- 16 September:
  - In Borno State, Nigeria, ISWAP claims responsibility for 4 different attacks that left a total of 8 people dead.
  - Mohammad Sharifulla is sentenced to 20 years in prison for providing material support to ISKP. Jurors could not agree if he was involved with the 2021 Kabul airport attack.
- 17 September – Three members of the Syrian security forces are killed during clashes with IS in Daraa, Syria.
- 19 September – A series of clashes, involving combined police and military forces and remaining wanted members of the Dawlah Islamiyah and the IS-linked BIFF, erupts in Tugunan, Special Geographic Area of the Bangsamoro, Philippines. Seven members from both groups are killed.
- 20 September:
  - In Kebbi State, Nigeria, militants belonging to the IS-linked Lakurawa beheaded the village head of Lafagu community.
  - In Kirkuk, Iraq, an IS mortar attack on Al-Malha village killed a woman and wounded several civilians.
- 22 September:
  - In Sri Lanka, 15 people are found guilty for involvement in the 2019 Sri Lanka Easter bombings.
  - 12 people were allegedly abducted and three more were killed in attacks by ISMP insurgents in Miangaleua, Muidumbe district, and Chai, Macomia district. The attackers were demanding MZN50,000 per hostage released, according to local sources.
- 23 September – In the DRC, ISCAP claims to have killed seven soldiers and burned more than 70 homes in two separate operations on the same day.
- 24 September:
  - In Lebanon, a Syrian IS member is arrested for plotting to assassinate Pope Leo XIV.
  - In Quebec City, Canada, a man had intended to carry out an attack on behalf of IS using a chemical weapon. There was online communication with the terrorist organization to build a chemical weapon that "could be used to poison Canadians".
  - IS' weekly newsletter released by Al-Naba reported 27 attacks across several of its regional branches, allegedly resulting in more than 74 casualties. Most of the reported operations occurred in West and Central Africa, with additional attacks in Mozambique, Iraq, Somalia, and Pakistan. It also reported attacks in Iraq and Balochistan, Pakistan, including sabotage and attacks on security personnel in Iraq, and the killing of two police officers in Pakistan.
- 25 September:
  - In Georgia, two suspected IS members are detained.
  - In Turkey, Turkish authorities arrested 83 suspected IS members during operations spanning 28 provinces.
  - Between 19 and 25 September, at least 17 people linked to ISWAP, including family members of an ISWAP fighter, surrendered to the Nigerian military in various parts of Borno State, Nigeria.
- 26 September – In Syria, Sharmeena Begum is arrested for membership and support of IS.
- 27 September:
  - In Syria, an IS cell was dismantled while planning attacks within the country; its activities spanned Raqqa, Idlib, Aleppo, and Homs.
  - In Iraq, a security operation was carried out against 3 people affiliated with IS, killing 2 people and arresting one.
  - In Sulaymaniyah Governorate, Iraq, three IS members are arrested.
  - Afghanistan forces allegedly killed 28 fighters associated with IS and capture another 32 from Pakistan.
  - In Niger, ISSP claimed responsibility for two separate attacks that killed more than 50 Nigerien security force members.
- 29 September – In South Korea, a 18-year-old South Korean is sentenced to prison for membership in IS.
- 30 September:
  - The United States fully withdraws from Iraq, marking the end of Operation Inherent Resolve in Iraq.
  - In Germany, a Kuwaiti-born German suspected of working for IS in Iraq as a military police officer is arrested.

=== October ===
- 1 October – In North Macedonia, authorities raided a suspected IS cell, seizing weapons and a flag.
- 2 October – IS' weekly editorial criticized the United Nations, portraying them as a mechanism used for the oppression of Muslims and presenting the establishment of a caliphate as the only solution.
- 5 October:
  - In Iraq, IS militants launched an attack on police near Hawija, killing one policeman and wounding four others. The attack is the first reported attack since the United States withdrew from Iraq on 30 September.
  - In Nigeria, senior ISWAP commander Abdussamad Ohida is killed in Owo, Ondo State.
  - In Indonesia, eleven suspected IS militants are arrested.
- 22 October – In Rankous, Syria, clashes between the Internal Security Forces and an IS cell left five people dead and wounded five others.
- 23 October – a mass shooting occurred at the Hammoud Church, a Greek Orthodox church in the Jordanian village of Hammoud, in Karak Governorate. At least seven people were killed and 40 others were wounded when three gunmen opened fire on the church. The perpetrators allegedly appeared in a video in which they verbally expressed their allegiance to IS.
- 26 October – The Royal Jordanian Air Force conducted airstrikes on Daraa and Suwayda Governorate in southern Syria, killing at least seven people. The alleged target was the Islamic State.
- 28 October – A minor, suspected of supporting the Islamic State, armed with two knives wounds a police officer outside the Israeli embassy in Belgrade, Serbia, before being shot and killed.

=== November ===
- 4 November – In Libya, a 20-year-old Copt is executed by IS for refusing to denounce Christianity.
- 5 November – A stabbing occurred near the Sri Lankan Embassy in Amman, Jordan, resulting in the death of a Public Security Directorate Corporal and the wounding of a second officer. The alleged perpetrator had been previously incarcerated since 2022 for attempting to join the Islamic State's Sinai Province and plotting an attack on an unnamed Jordanian security compound, being sentenced to nine years in prison but released in October 2026 for provisional reasons.

== See also ==
- Timeline of the Islamic State
