= 2026 Old Dominion University shooting =

School shooting in Virginia, US

2026 Old Dominion University Shooting
- Location: 36.8875°N 76.3052°W; Old Dominion University; Norfolk, Virginia, US
- Date: March 12, 2026 c.10:49 a.m. (EDT)
- Target: Reserve Officers' Training Corps members
- Attack type: School shooting
- Weapon: .22-caliber Glock 44 semi-automatic pistol
- Deaths: 2 (including the perpetrator)
- Injuries: 2
- Victim: Brandon Shah
- Perpetrator: Mohamed Bailor Jalloh
- Defender: Unknown amount of students
- Motive: Under investigation (possibly terrorism)
- Charges: Firearm seller: Unlawful firearms dealing offenses and false statements

On March 12, 2026, a shooting took place at Old Dominion University in Norfolk, Virginia, United States. The assailant, 36-year-old Mohamed Bailor Jalloh, attacked a Reserve Officers' Training Corps (ROTC) group, yelling "Allahu Akbar" while opening fire. One ROTC instructor was killed and two ROTC cadets were injured before Jalloh was fatally stabbed as the students subdued him. The shooting is being investigated as an act of terrorism.

== Background ==
Old Dominion University is a public research university in Norfolk, Virginia, United States. In 2023, it had an enrollment of 23,494 students. Its main campus covers 250 acres. Constant Hall, the place where the shooting occurred, is the hub of the university's College of Business. It has two lecture halls and another 19 classrooms.

== Shooting ==
CCTV showed the gunman parked his car on campus at approximately 9:40 a.m. EDT. At around 10:43 a.m., he opened fire on members of the university's ROTC program in Constant Hall before a group of cadets, two of whom were injured during the struggle, subdued and fatally stabbed him. Jalloh entered the ROTC classroom shortly before the instructor, Brandon Shah, was about to let the students leave class and asked if it was a ROTC class. Students described Jalloh as looking nervous, and when no one replied to the initial question, he repeated the question. When someone replied yes, he shouted "Allahu Akbar," before opening fire at the instructor, Brandon Shah, and the students inside the classroom.

After Jalloh opened fire, some students dove for cover, but one student used a pocket knife to stab Jalloh as Shah and Jalloh grappled with each other. Shah and the student tackled the shooter to the ground and were then joined by other students, and they stabbed him, punched him, and attempted to disarm him, with one student eventually able to get the gun away from Jalloh. After Jalloh had been subdued, Shah fell onto a wall and a student caught him as he fell. After Shah fell, some students made a tourniquet with a belt to try and stop the bleeding from a gunshot wound Shah had suffered to his leg.

At 10:48 a.m., a University alert urged students to avoid the area and follow run-hide-fight protocols. The first call was made in less than 10 minutes. Police arrived four minutes later and found that the shooter was dead. Three nearby schools were placed on lockdown. Dozens of police and first responders were dispatched to the scene. At 12:10 p.m., the university sent an all-clear alert stating that there was no remaining threat but to avoid the area where the shooting occurred.

== Victims ==
One person was killed and two ROTC members were injured. Brandon Shah and one of the injured students were transported to the Level 1 trauma center at Sentara Norfolk General Hospital in critical condition, where Shah died from his injuries. Initially, police reported they were the only victims; however, another victim brought themself to a hospital in Virginia Beach. All victims were members of the university.

The deceased victim, 42-year-old Lieutenant Colonel Brandon A. Shah, was a resident of Staunton. At the time of his death, he was the department chair for military sciences at Old Dominion University. Born in Staunton; his father was a Pakistani American. Shah graduated from Charlottesville High School. He enlisted in the Army in 2003 as an aviation operations specialist and enrolled at Old Dominion University in 2005. Shah received his Army commission and graduated in 2007 with a bachelor's degree in sociology and a minor in military science. He was an Apache pilot. Shah had served in Afghanistan, and Iraq; and received numerous badges and awards including a Senior Army Aviator Badge, a Combat Action Badge, two Bronze Star Medals, and Air Medal with valor device. He completed postgraduate education both at University of Georgia's Terry College of Business and the University of Kansas. Shah had a wife and son.

== Perpetrator ==
Authorities identified the shooter as 36-year-old Mohamed Bailor Jalloh (September 1989 – March 12, 2026), a naturalized US citizen, who was born in Sierra Leone, and had been a resident of Sterling, Virginia. Jalloh previously served as a member of the Virginia Army National Guard from 2009 until early 2016. He previously pled guilty on October 27, 2016, for attempting to provide material to support the Islamic State before his arrest on July 3, 2016, and was sentenced to 11 years in federal prison and five years of supervised release on February 10, 2017. He was registered as inmate #90187-083 based on a document from the United States District Court for the Eastern District of Virginia, and was incarcerated at Federal Correctional Institution, Allenwood Low, near Allenwood, Pennsylvania. He was released early from both Allenwood and federal custody on December 23, 2024, after completing a drug treatment program. Federal inmates convicted of terrorism-related offenses are ineligible for early release via such programs or for good behavior. The last contact with his parole officer was four months before the shooting. After being released, he took online classes at the university.

Court documents confirmed that Jalloh traveled back to Sierra Leone on June 11, 2015, and returned to the United States on January 16, 2016. During his stay at Sierra Leone, Jalloh became radicalized while briefly living in Nigeria in August 2015, after meeting with Islamic State (IS) members and viewing extremist propaganda, including lectures from Al-Qaeda-linked cleric Anwar al-Awlaki. On the day before his arrest, Jalloh test-fired and purchased a Stag Arms 5.56×45mm NATO rifle from the Blue Ridge Arsenal gun store and firing range in Chantilly, Virginia, after attempting to purchase a Bushmaster XM-15 rifle at the same store, and failing to purchase another firearm one month earlier in North Carolina. Jalloh had previously praised Muhammad Youssef Abdulazeez, who committed the 2015 Chattanooga shootings, in which five people were killed at two military installations. Jalloh told an FBI confidential informant, pretending to be an Islamic State member, that he had considered carrying out a shooting in the United States sometime in summer 2016, during Ramadan, making references to the 2009 Fort Hood shooting and stating that he believed that such attacks were "100 percent the right thing".

== Aftermath ==
Memorial to Brandon Shah at Old Dominion University

Classes were cancelled and operations on the main campus were suspended for the remainder of the day. The university was closed the day after the shooting. Norfolk Botanical Garden offered free admission to students, faculty and staff of the university for the weekend.

The university closed Constant Hall for the remaining Spring 2026 semester. Old Dominion University sent out a questionnaire to students via email, asking them about any past felony convictions as "an additional step to further strengthen our awareness and support the campus community". State law prevents universities from asking about criminal histories in student applications or denying admission based on them, but universities are allowed the right to rescind admissions if the school determines that a student's criminal history makes them "a threat to the institution’s community".

The day after the shooting, the University of Virginia, George Mason University, Bridgewater College, Randolph–Macon College, Longwood University, and Shenandoah University all investigated the areas of their respective on-campus libraries due to bomb threats.

Eight cadets received Meritorious Service Medals, and two cadets received a Purple Heart, for their actions that ended the shooting. Shah was memorialized at a funeral held in the Chartway Arena, which was attended by over 600 people including Representatives Jen Kiggans and Bobby Scott, and Governor Abigail Spanberger. Shah posthumously received a Legion of Merit and a Purple Heart.

== Investigation ==
Federal Bureau of Investigation (FBI) director, Kash Patel, said in a post on X (formerly Twitter) that the shooting is being investigated as an act of terrorism. The Joint Terrorism Task Force (JTTF) is investigating. A day after the shooting, the FBI raided the perpetrator's home. Investigators also went to the house. .22 caliber ammunition consistent with the firearm used in the shooting was recovered. Also on March 13, federal authorities arrested Kenya Mcchell Chapman, a 32-year-old Smithfield resident accused of unlawfully selling a Glock 44 with a partially altered serial number to Jalloh. Chapman stole the firearm from Newport News about a year prior to the shooting and sold it to Jalloh for $100 in cash just days before it. Chapman said he met Jalloh at work and Jalloh said that he needed the gun for protection as a delivery driver. He frequently contacted Chapman the week prior to the shooting. Chapman was known to law enforcement as he was previously under federal investigation for straw-purchasing firearms, including two used in homicides. He was charged by the United States Department of Justice (DOJ) with false statements and unlawful firearms dealing offenses.

== Reactions ==
President Donald Trump said on March 13 that "the Old Dominion University shooting was carried out by an individual previously arrested for providing material support to an Islamic State terrorist group, and who was released early from federal prison under the Biden Admin. This should have never happened."

Rep. Kiggans was "furious" that this "terrorist monster" with ties known to ISIS was walking around Hampton Roads and offered her condolences to Lt. Col. Shah's family.

Norfolk Commonwealth Attorney Ramin Fatehi called gun violence a "national sickness", and urged legislators to enact gun control.

For its first game of the 2026 season, the Old Dominion Monarchs football team wore camouflage uniforms to honor Shah. The jerseys were sold after the game and the proceeds donated to Shah's family.

== See also ==
- 2026 Austin bar shooting, a mass shooting 11 days prior that was also linked to terrorism
- Crime in Virginia
- 2026 New York City bombing attempt, five days prior that was also linked to terrorism
- Temple Israel synagogue attack, a terrorist attack on a synagogue in Michigan on the same day
