= 2025–2026 United States airstrikes in Syria =

2025–2026 United States military action

Operation Hawkeye Strike
- Part of the war on terror, war against the Islamic State, Operation Inherent Resolve, United States intervention in Syria and the Aftermath of the Syrian civil war
- A video depicting a retaliatory strike against the Islamic State
- Type: Airstrikes
- Location: Syria
- Planned by: United States
- Commanded by: (President of the United States) Donald Trump
- Target: Islamic State; Al-Qaeda
- Objective: Retaliation against the December 2025 Palmyra attack
- Date: 19 December 2025 – 16 April 2026
- Executed by: United States Air Force; Royal Jordanian Air Force

Operation Hawkeye Strike was a retaliatory military action by the United States against the Islamic State, following the December 2025 Palmyra attack by a Syrian police officer, suspected of being affiliated with the Islamic State, that killed two U.S. soldiers and a civilian interpreter.

== Background ==
After the December 2025 Palmyra attack, the United States, in coordination with regional allies, conducted 10 operations which, according to an US-official, led to the killing or arrest of 23 individuals suspected of links to the Islamic State.

== Operations ==
On 19 December 2025, the United States, supported by Jordan, launched a massive airstrike campaign across Syria consisting of at least 100 munitions against 70 Islamic State targets. The United States operated A-10s and F-16s, Apache helicopters and HIMARS guided artillery with support from Jordanian F-16s.

The operation was named "Hawkeye Strike" to reflect the involvement of Iowa-based units and the high level of precision required to identify targets across Syria's vast landscape. Iowa is nicknamed the "Hawkeye State".

According to U.S. officials and the Syrian Observatory for Human Rights (SOHR), the strikes targeted command centers, weapons depots, training facilities, drone sites, and logistical hubs in central and eastern Syria, including Jabal al-Amour area near Palmyra in Homs province, Ma'adan desert in rural Raqqa, and al-Hammad desert in Deir ez-Zor province. The SOHR reported that at least five Islamic State members were killed, including a cell leader involved in operating and coordinating unmanned aerial systems used by the group.

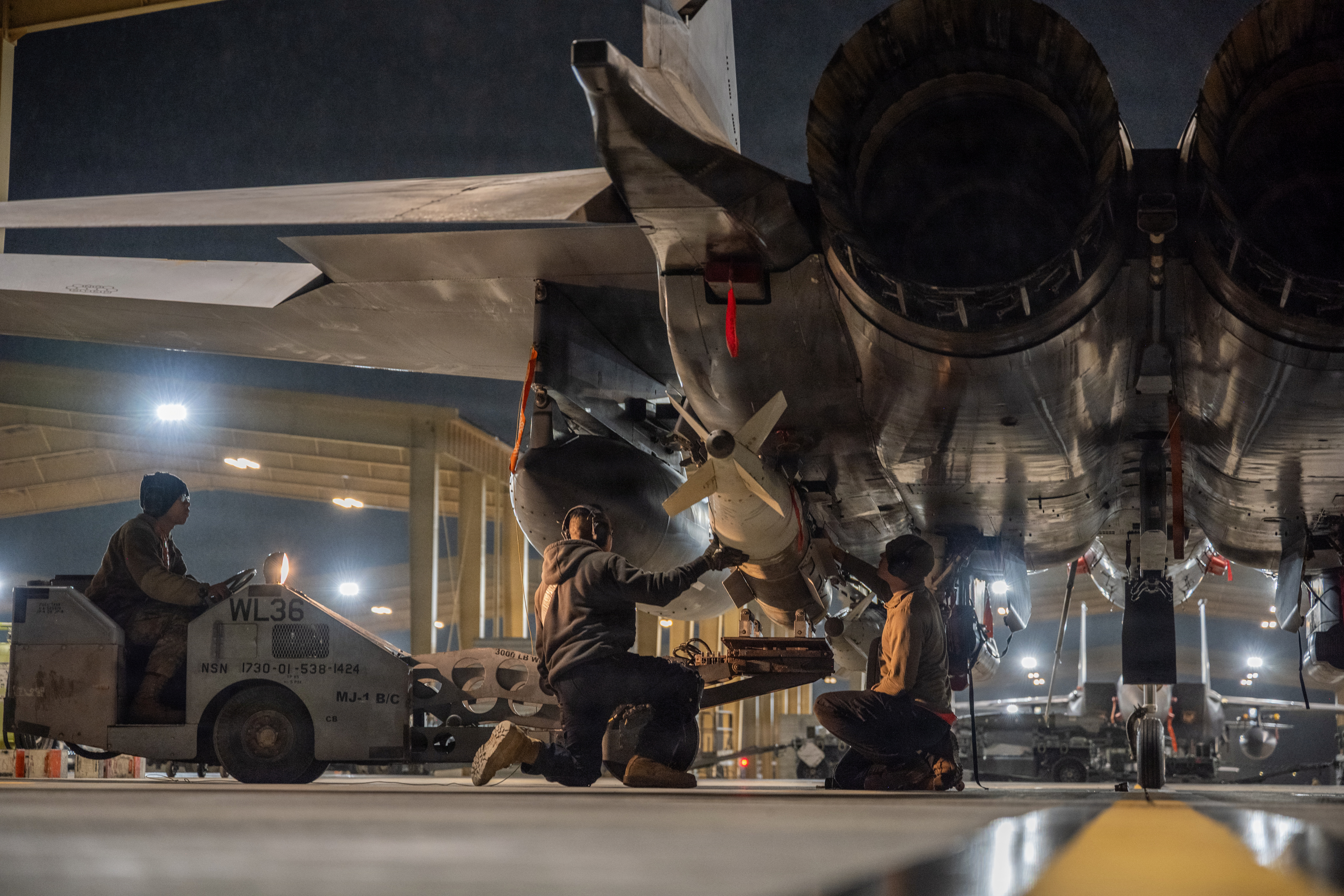
U.S. Airmen load munitions onto an F-15E Strike Eagle during Operation Hawkeye Strike, 10 January 2026

On 10 January 2026 at around 12:30 pm EST, the U.S. and Jordan launched a second wave of airstrikes against Islamic State targets in Syria, utilizing over 90 precision munitions to strike over 35 targets. According to a U.S. official, over 20 aircraft were involved, reportedly including F-15Es, A-10s, AC-130Js, MQ-9s and Jordanian F-16s. Casualty figures and the exact locations of the strikes remained unclear.

On 16 January, the U.S. conducted another retaliatory strike in northwestern Syria, killing Bilal Hasan al-Jasim, a senior leader of an al-Qaeda-affiliated group who was linked to the 13 December ambush.

From 27 January to 2 February, the U.S. conducted five strikes against "multiple" Islamic State targets in Syria, locating and destroying "an ISIS communication site, critical logistics node, and weapons storage facilities" utilizing "50 precision munitions delivered by fixed-wing, rotary-wing, and unmanned aircraft," according to CENTCOM. From 3 to 12 February 2026, U.S. forces carried out ten additional strikes across Syria targeting more than 30 Islamic State infrastructure and weapons storage sites, with more than 50 Islamic State fighters killed or captured during the broader operation.

== Reactions ==
=== State actors ===
- Jordan: Jordan confirmed its involvement in striking Islamic State targets, stating that it aimed "to prevent extremist groups from exploiting these areas as launching pads to threaten the security of Syria's neighbors and the wider region, especially after ISIS regrouped and rebuilt its capabilities in southern Syria."
- Syria: The Syrian foreign ministry said it "reiterates its steadfast commitment to fighting ISIS and ensuring that it has no safe havens on Syrian territory, and will continue to intensify military operations against it wherever it poses a threat."
- United States: President Donald Trump called the first retaliatory strikes "very successful" and said, "We hit the ISIS thugs in Syria who were trying to regroup after their decimation by the Trump administration five years ago." Following the strikes, Defense Secretary Pete Hegseth stated that "this is not the beginning of a war — it is a declaration of vengeance" and that "the United States of America, under President Trump's leadership, will never hesitate and never relent to defend our people."

=== Non-state actors ===
- Syrian Democratic Forces: The SDF praised the U.S. strikes for targeting "the hideouts of the ISIS terrorist organization in Syria during the past hours", saying that "this continuous air support represents a decisive factor in preventing the organization from regrouping its cells or restoring its sabotage activity."

== Analysis ==
According to Nanar Hawach, senior Syria analyst at the International Crisis Group, Syrian president Ahmed al-Sharaa is "trying very hard to walk a thin line" by engaging with international partners while simultaneously not alienating some of his hard-line supporters, including those which formerly held extremist views, which could be antagonized at strikes by a Western country on their homeland.

According to Andrew Tabler, who was the Syria director during the first Trump administration, "the number of strikes shows ISIS' presence remains stronger than previously acknowledged."
