= Syrian desert =

Desert in West Asia

- بادية الشام
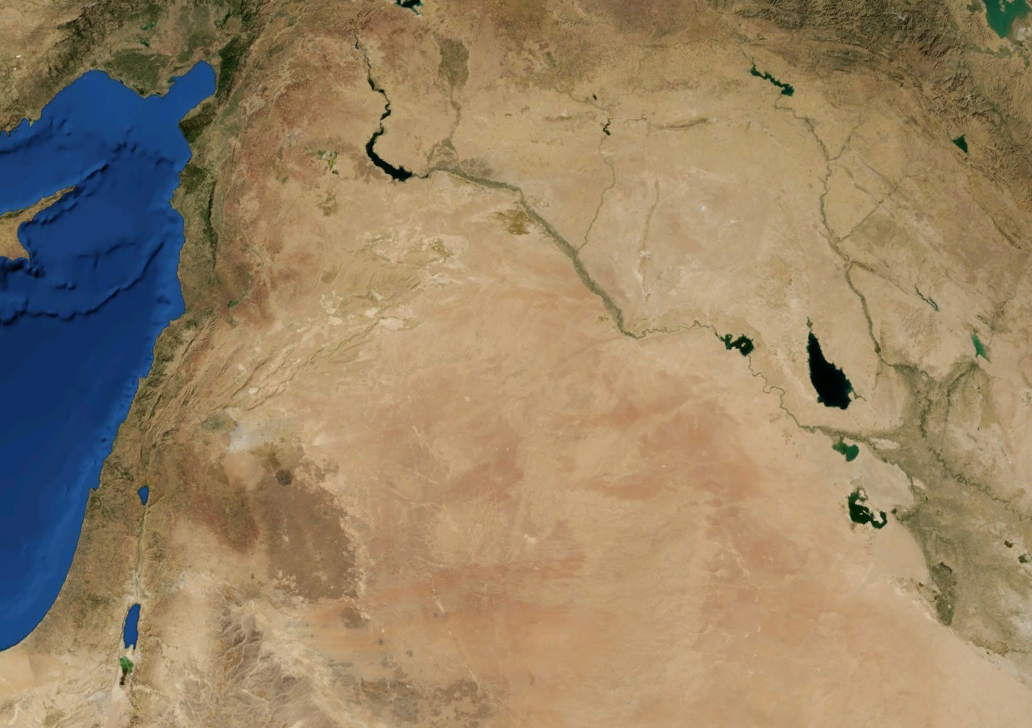
- Composite satellite image
- Area: 500,000 km^{2} (190,000 mi^{2})

Geography
- Countries: Syria; Jordan; Iraq; Saudi Arabia
- Coordinates: 33°24′N 38°45′E
- Interactive map of Syrian desert

The Syrian desert (Arabic: بادية الشام Bādiyat Ash-Shām), also known as the North Arabian desert, the Jordanian steppe, the Syrian steppe, or the Badiya, or Badiyat al-Sham, is a region of desert, semi-desert, and steppe, covering about 500,000 square kilometers (200,000 square miles) of West Asia, including parts of northern Saudi Arabia, eastern Jordan, southern Syria, and western Iraq. It accounts for about 85% of the land area of Jordan and 55% of Syria. To the south, it borders and merges into the Arabian Desert. The land is open, rocky or gravelly desert pavement, cut with occasional wadis, or river valleys, generally dry riverbeds.

== Location and name ==
The desert is bounded by the Orontes Valley and the volcanic field of Harrat al-Shamah to the west, and by the Euphrates to the east. In the north, the desert gives way to the more fertile areas and to the south it runs into the deserts of the Arabian Peninsula.

Parts of the Syrian Desert have been referred to otherwise, such as Homs Desert, Palmyrene Desert for the part around Palmyra, and, from an Iraqi point of view, Western Desert for the part of the eastern section of the Syrian Desert that lies entirely within the borders of Iraq. The name Shamiyah has also been used for the Syrian Desert, the name having been translated in the past as Badiyat al-Sham or Badiyat ash-Sham.

== Geography ==
The 700–900-metre high (2,300–3,000 ft) region in the middle of the desert is the Hamad Plateau, a rather flat, stony semi-desert consisting of limestone bedrock covered with chert gravel. What little rain arrives on the plateau flows into local salt flats. The highest peaks of the plateau are those of the 1,000 m (3,300 ft)+ Khawr um Wual in Saudi Arabia, and the 960-metre high (3,150 ft) Jebel Aneiza, at the border tripoint of Jordan, Iraq and Saudi Arabia.

Together with the other deserts of the Arabian Peninsula, the Hamad Desert has been described as one of the most arid deserts of the world.

== Wildlife ==
Some of the climax plants in the Syrian Badia are Caroxylon vermiculatum, Stipa barbata, Artemisia herba-alba and Atriplex leucoclada. This desert ecosystem is under threat from drought, over-grazing, hunting and other human activities. Some native animals no longer inhabit this area, and many plant species have died out while grasses with a lower nutritional value to livestock have replaced them.

The Syrian Desert is the origin of the golden hamster.

Storks, herons, cranes, small waders, waterfowl, and also raptors visit the seasonal lakes. Small rodents are common, as are their predators such as snakes, scorpions and camel spiders. Previously common were Arabian sand gazelle, Indian wolf, golden jackal, Arabian red fox, sand cat and caracal, as well as ostrich, Asiatic cheetah, hartebeest, and onager, but larger mammals are now locally extinct.

== History ==
=== Ancient ===
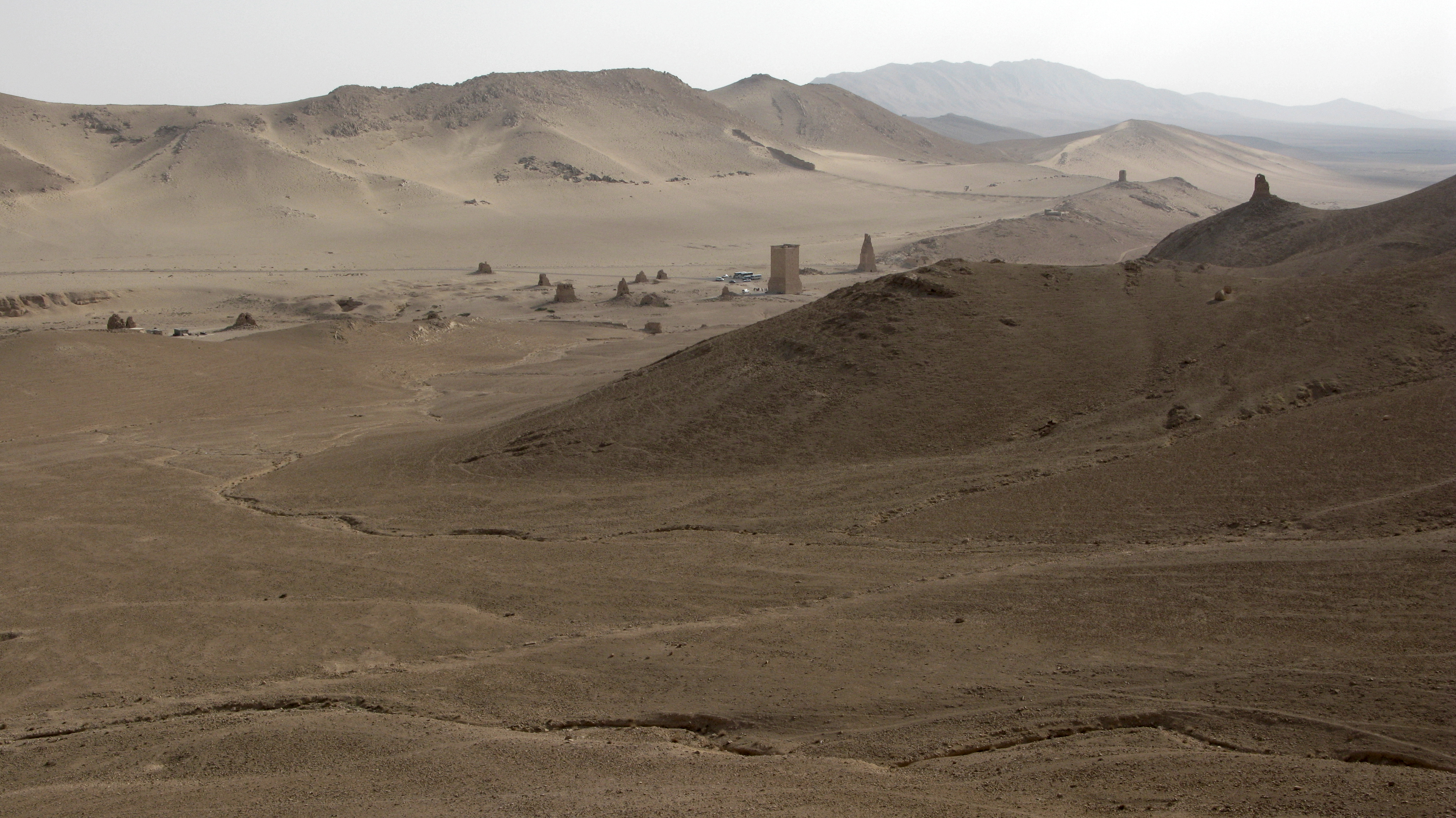
Palmyra was an important trading center located in the Syrian desert

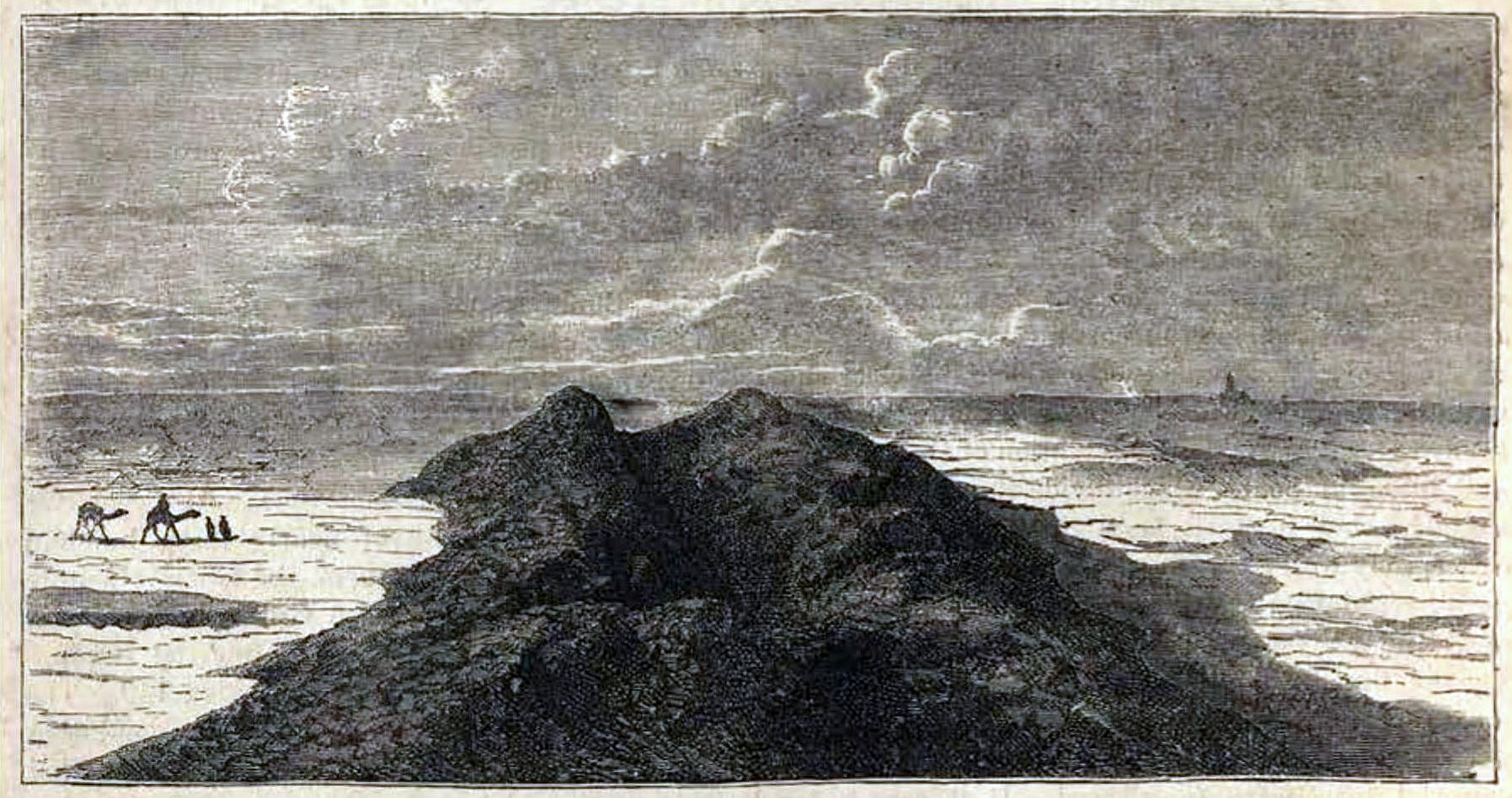
View of the Syrian Desert

The desert was historically inhabited by nomadic Arabs (Bedouins) and nomadic Aramean tribes, and many tribes still remain in the region, their members living mainly in towns and settlements built near oases. Some Bedouin still maintain their traditional way of life in the desert. Safaitic inscriptions, proto-Arabic texts written by literate Bedouin, are found throughout the Syrian Desert. These date roughly from the first century BC to the fourth century AD.

One of the most important ancient settlements in the Syrian desert is Palmyra; first mentioned in the second millennium BC, the city was an important trading center in Roman times, and its people were renowned merchants who took advantage of its strategic position on the Silk Road linking the Far East to the Mediterranean Sea, by taxing caravans that were passing by, establishing colonies on the silk road, and trading in the rare commodities from the far east, thus bringing enormous wealth to their city.

Another important ancient settlement is the city of Dura-Europos on the Euphrates. Originally a fortress, it was founded during the Seleucid Empire and initially given the name Dura, which means "Fortress", but was called Europos by the Greeks. The combination Dura-Europos is a modern invention. The city prospered, mainly for its location on the Euphrates, fostering commercial and military connections between Mesopotamia to the Mediterranean. After it was raided by the Sasanian emperor Shapur I in the 250s, most of its citizens fled, and under Sasanian rule, the city was abandoned.

=== Modern ===
During the Ottoman Empire's Armenian genocide, large numbers of victims were deported across the Euphrates River into the desert to die.

The Syrian desert was first traversed by motor vehicle in 1919.

During the Iraq War, the desert served as a major supply line for the Iraqi resistance, with the Iraq portion of the desert becoming a primary stronghold of the Sunni resistance operating in the Al Anbar Governorate, particularly after the Multi-National Force – Iraq capture of Fallujah during the Second Battle of Fallujah. A series of Coalition military operations were relatively ineffective at removing the insurgency presence in the Desert. As the resistance began to gain control of the surrounding areas, coalition spokesmen began to downplay the importance of the Syrian Desert as a center of operations; nevertheless the Syrian Desert remained one of the primary routes for smuggling equipment and insurgents due to its location near the Syrian border. By September 2006, the resistance had gained control of virtually all of the Anbar Governorate and had moved most of their forces, equipment and leaders further east to resistance-controlled cities near the Euphrates river.

During the Syrian civil war and concurrent War in Iraq, ISIS managed to occupy most of the desert region in both Iraq and Syria between 2013 and 2015 during the Anbar campaign and Eastern Syria offensive. Starting in December 2016 and throughout 2017, several campaigns successfully retook the entire region from the militant group, leaving only sporadic skirmishes.

== Economy and agriculture ==
With low rainfall and poor-quality soils, today the region is principally used as rangeland for livestock. Bedouin herdsmen, many of whom are still nomadic, graze about twelve million sheep and goats here, as well as a smaller number of camels.

The International Fund for Agricultural Development aims to alleviate rural poverty, and in 1995, in cooperation with the Syrian government, it started a project to rehabilitate over a million hectares of degraded land in the Syrian Badia. In some areas, when grazing was restricted, there was a spontaneous return of many of the native plants. In other areas which were more heavily degraded, grazing restrictions were supplemented by reseeding and the planting of fodder species. By the time the project ended in 2010, nearly a quarter of a million hectares had been reseeded, and nearly a hundred thousand hectares had been planted with native fodder shrubs. The result has been a great success, with some herdsmen reporting tenfold increases in the productivity of their livestock.

== Gallery ==
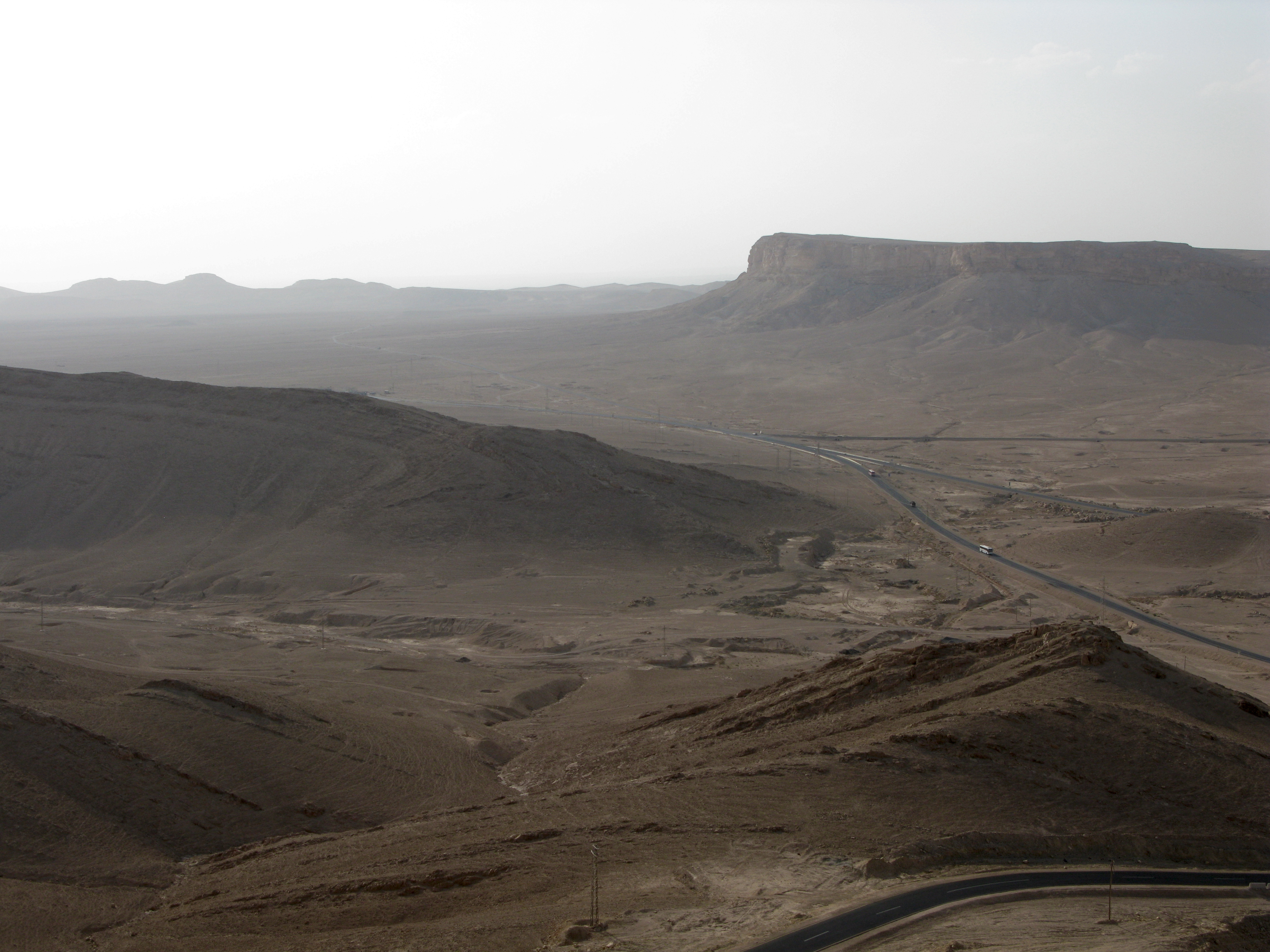
Desert around Palmyra

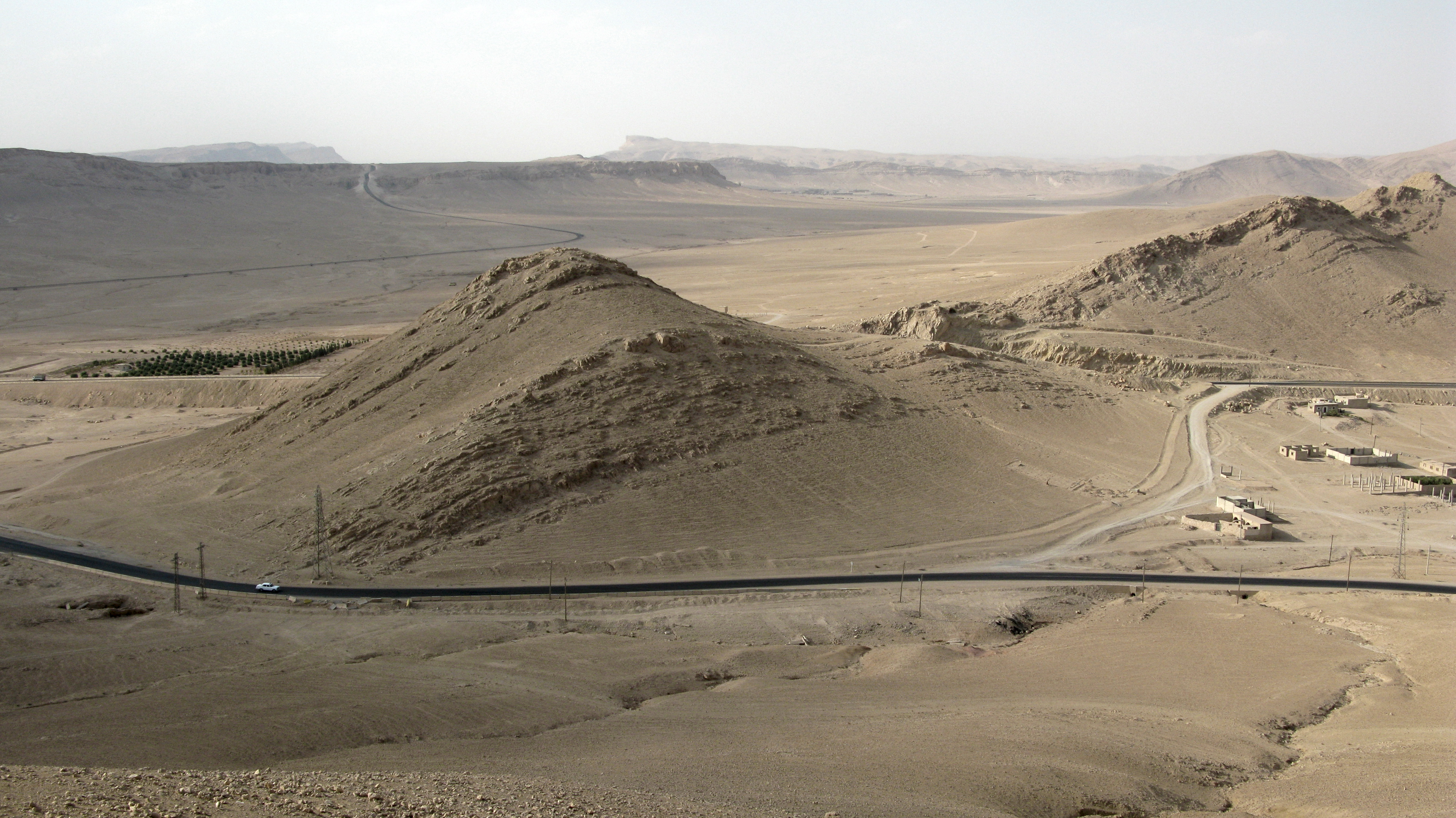
Road in the desert near Palmyra

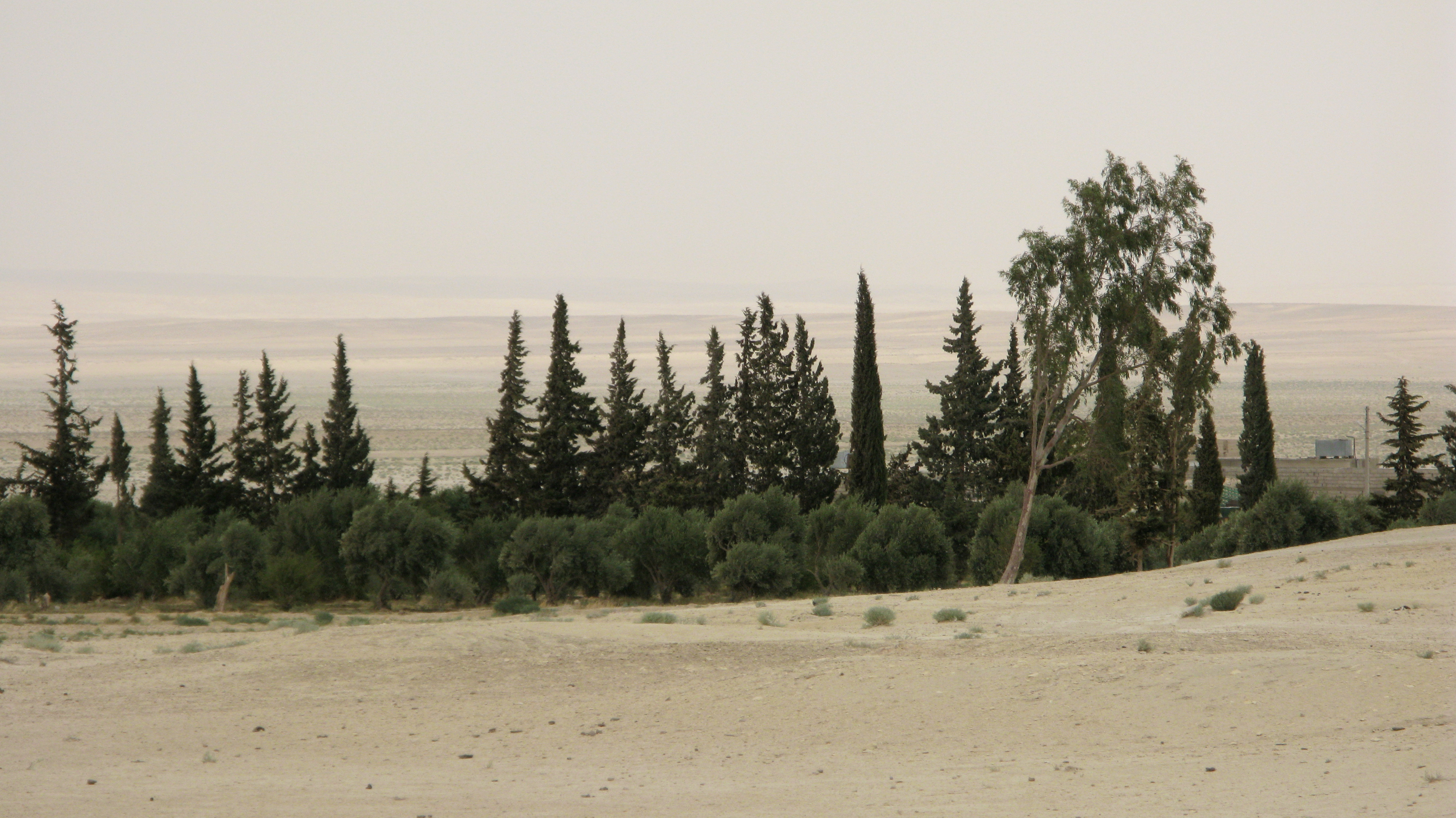
Oasis near Al-Sukhnah

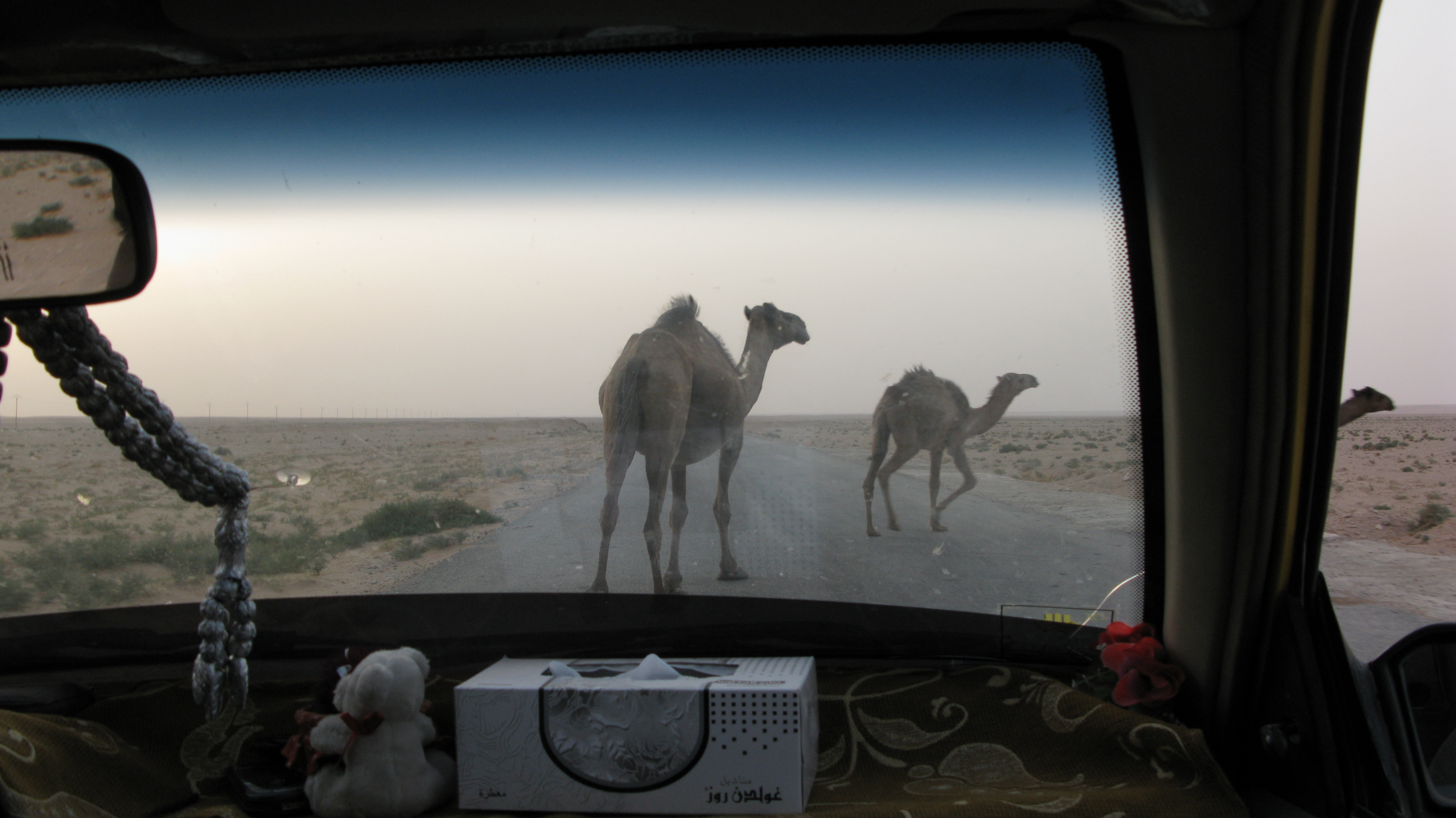
Camels in the desert near Raqqa

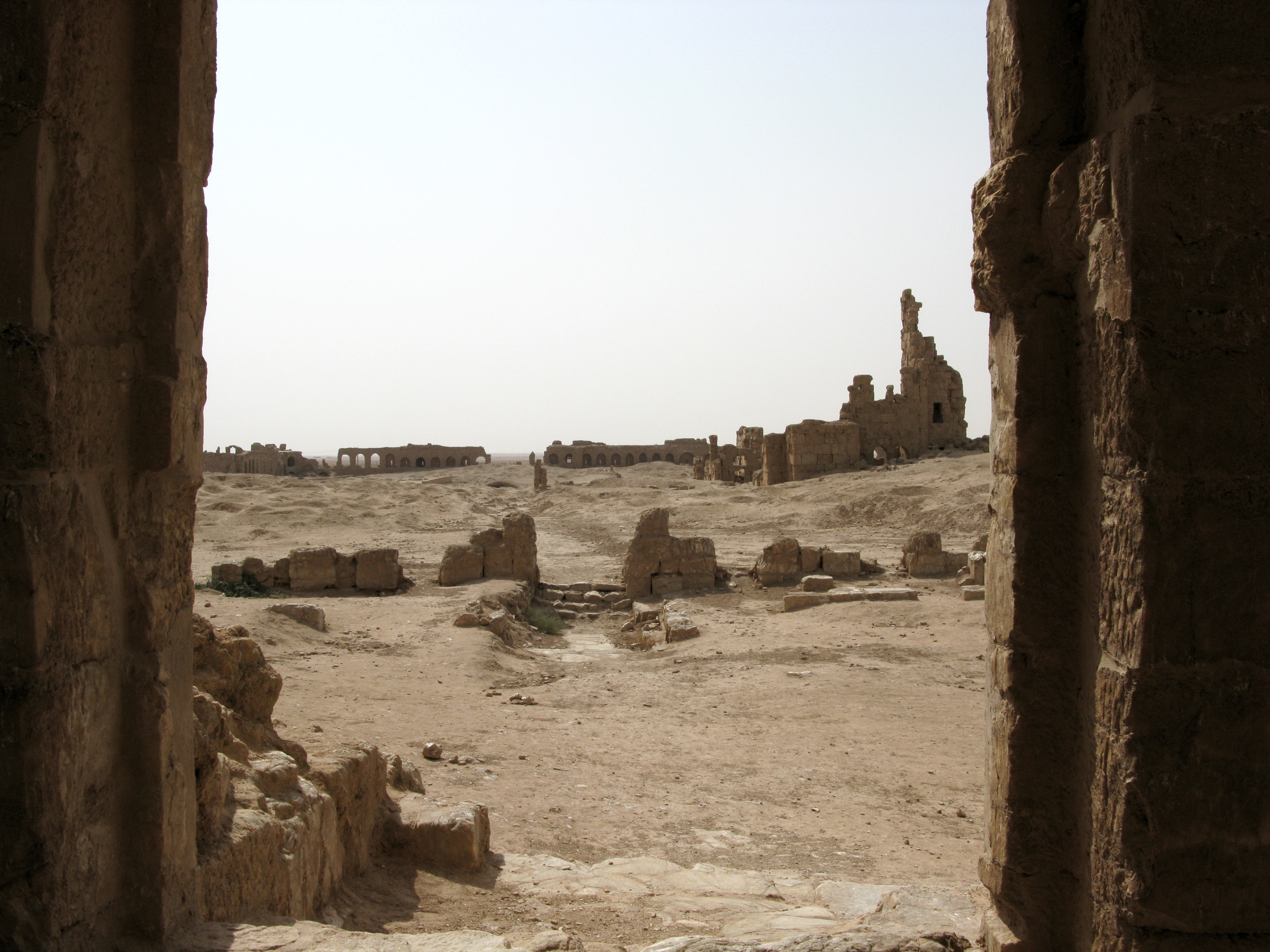
Resafa ruins southwest of Raqqa and the Euphrates.

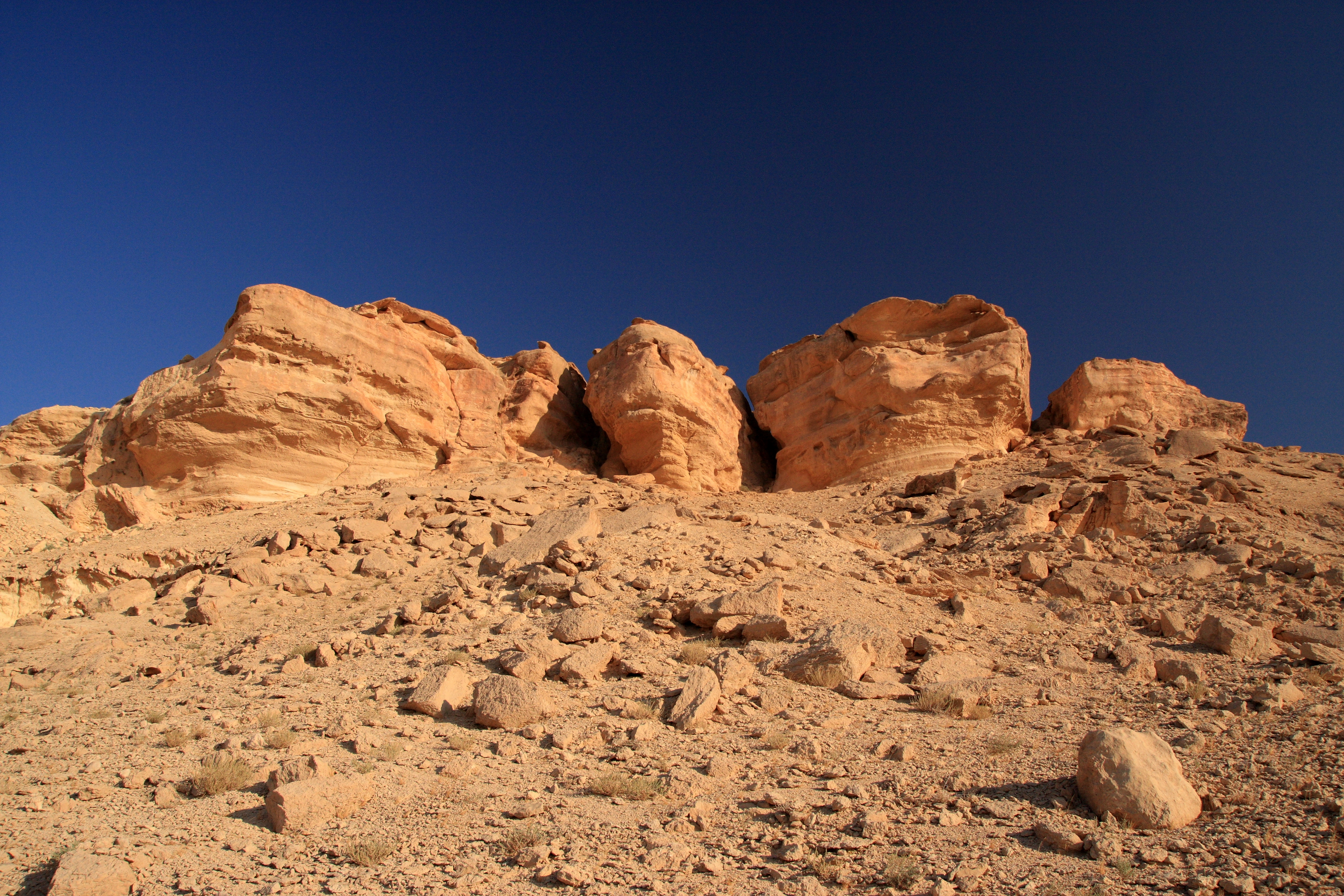
Rocks, unidentified location

== See also ==
- Arabian Desert
- Fertile Crescent
- List of deserts by area
