= 2026 attack on Israeli consulate in Istanbul =

Terrorist attack in Istanbul, Turkey

- Part of Turkey–Islamic State conflict
- Location: 41°4′53″N 29°0′45.6″E; Istanbul, Turkey
- Date: 7 April 2026; 12:15 (UTC+3)
- Target: Consulate General of Israel in Istanbul and police officers
- Attack type: Shootout, terrorist attack
- Deaths: 1 (a perpetrator)
- Injuries: 4 (including 2 perpetrators)
- Perpetrators: Yunus E.S †; Onur Ç; Enes Ç
- No. of participants: 3
- Motive: Religious terrorism

On 7 April, 2026, three gunmen affiliated with the Islamic State attacked the Israeli Consulate in Istanbul, Turkey. One attacker was killed while two other gunmen and two police officers sustained injuries. Both Turkey and Israel declared the attack an act of terrorism.

== Background ==
The attack took place during the 2026 Iran war, causing high tensions all around the Middle East and the European continent. The conflict has strained Israel–Turkey relations.

The three gunmen arrived in Istanbul via a rental car from İzmit, around 100 kilometres east of Istanbul.

== The attack ==
On 7 April, 2026, at 12:15 pm (UTC+3), three perpetrators opened fire next to the Israeli Consulate building in Istanbul. At least two dozens shots were heard in less than a minute. The consulate was not staffed at the time of the shooting. One of the attackers was killed by a police officer. Two perpetrators were injured and captured, and two police officers were lightly injured. Both officers were transported to hospital in non-life threatening condition.

== Investigation ==
Turkey police sealed off the area and the incident was being investigated as an terrorist attack. Turkish interior minister Mustafa Çiftçi identified the deceased gunman as Yunus E.S., and the injured being Onur Ç and Enes Ç, who are brothers. He claimed Yunus E.S. belonged to a group connected to "an organisation that exploits religion". Turkish media speculated that this might be the Islamic State, although no group had claimed responsibility for it at the time. Nine people were detained in connection with the attack.

In a nationwide operation Turkey arrested nearly 200 Islamic State suspects.

== Reactions ==
The Israeli Ministry of Foreign Affairs condemned the attack, calling it an act of Islamic terrorism, and thanked the Turkish security forces' quick action.

United States Ambassador to Turkey Tom Barrack condemned the attack, calling it an "attack on international order" and commending the Turkish security forces for their response.

Turkish president Recep Tayyip Erdoğan called it a "heinous terrorist attack" and said it would not affect or damage Turkey's trust and security.

== See also ==
- List of attacks against Israeli embassies and diplomats
- List of attacks on diplomatic missions
- 1992 Buenos Aires Israeli embassy bombing
- 1994 London Israeli embassy bombing
- 2008 United States consulate in Istanbul attack
- List of terrorist incidents in 2026
