= 2026 Damascus bombings =

Bomb attack and alleged assassination attempt in Damascus

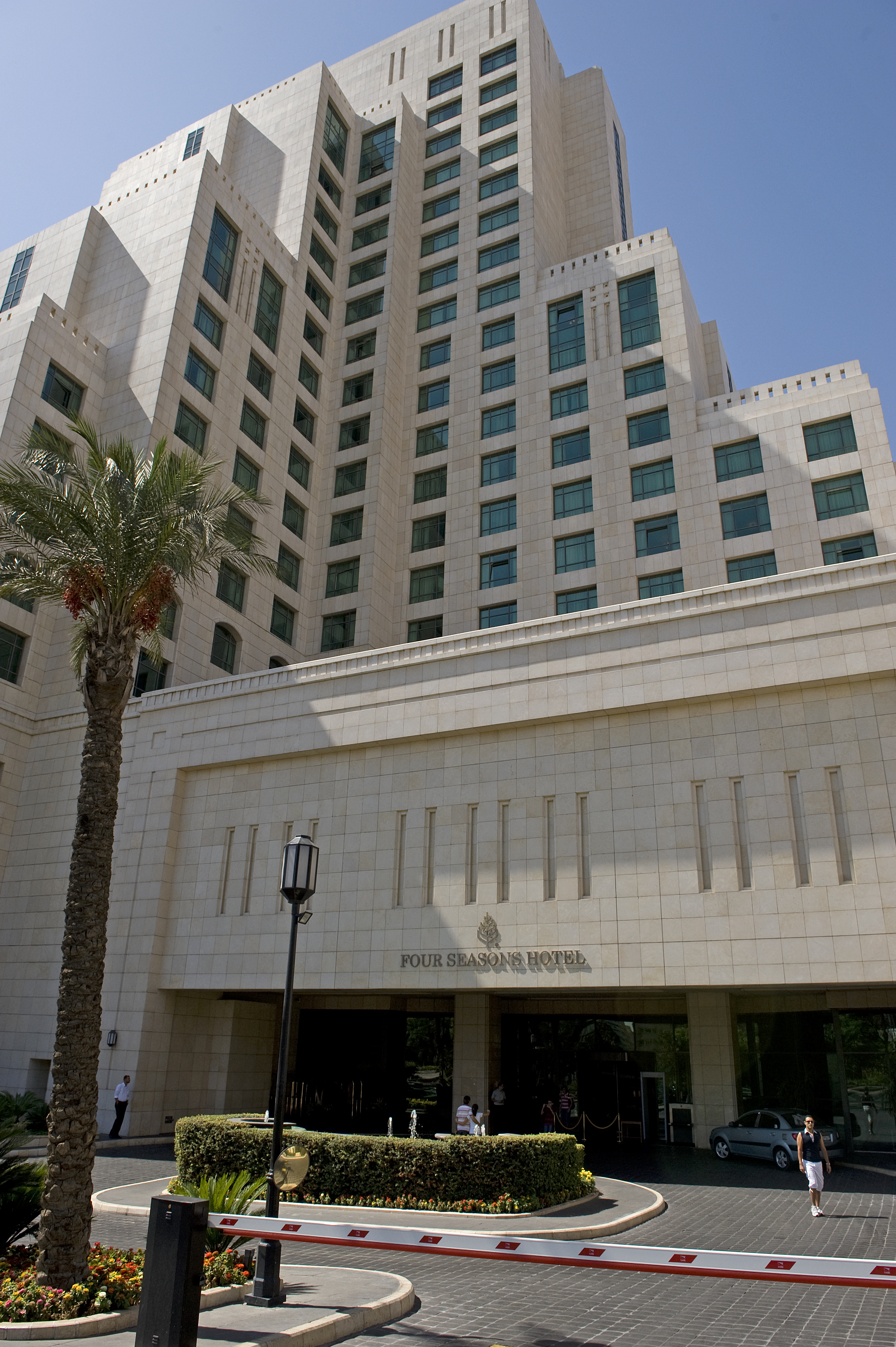
- Four Seasons Hotel Damascus in 2008, near where the bombings occurred
- Location: 33°30′47.8″N 36°17′29.8″E; Near the Four Seasons Hotel Damascus, Syria
- Date: 7 July 2026 c. 11:00 (AST)
- Target: Emmanuel Macron (alleged)
- Deaths: 1
- Injuries: 36
- Perpetrator: Islamic State (accused)

On 7 July 2026, two explosive devices exploded near the Four Seasons Hotel Damascus, killing a person and wounding 36 more. The attacks occurred during the state visit of Emmanuel Macron there.

== Background ==
Following the fall of President Bashar al-Assad on 8 December 2024, Syria's new government struggled to establish full control over the country and to contain attacks by extremist groups and remnants of the former regime. The country also experienced a resurgence of attacks by the Islamic State, which exploited gaps in security and targeted civilians, religious minorities and government-controlled areas.

On 2 July 2026, an explosive device detonated at a café near Damascus' main judicial complex in the Midan neighbourhood, killing 10 people and injuring 21 others. No group claimed responsibility for the attack, though many Syrians blamed loyalists of the former Assad regime. During funeral processions on 3 July, mourners called for those responsible to be brought to justice. On the same day, a man on a motorcycle attacked a security checkpoint in the Damascus suburb of Jaramana with hand grenades, wounding three security personnel before being killed when another grenade exploded in his hand. Syrian authorities arrested another suspect in connection with the attack.

== Bombing ==
At approximately 11:00 AST on 7 July 2026, two improvised explosive devices detonated approximately between the Four Seasons Hotel and the Ministry of Tourism building in Damascus while French President Emmanuel Macron was on a state visit to Syria.

According to the Syrian Ministry of Interior, security forces had discovered two improvised explosive devices near the hotel. One bomb was placed in a dumpster, and the other bomb was placed in a parked vehicle near the Four Seasons Hotel. Ministry spokesperson Nour al-Baba stated that the bombs had been planted only minutes before the explosions. The explosions injured at least 18 people, including civilians and members of the security forces. The blasts damaged several nearby vehicles and shattered windows of surrounding buildings, including structures in the vicinity of the Four Seasons Hotel. As of 8 July 2026, the Ministry of Health reported one death and 36 injuries.

The first explosion occurred shortly after Macron's motorcade had departed the Four Seasons Hotel for the People's Palace, where he was scheduled to meet Syrian President Ahmed al-Sharaa. The Élysée confirmed that Macron was safe and would continue his visit to Damascus.

=== Perpetrators ===
On 9 July 2026, the Syrian Ministry of Interior announced the arrest of all members of a cell accused of carrying out the Damascus bombings during French President Emmanuel Macron's visit. Syrian Interior Minister Anas Khattab and Rif Dimashq internal security commander Ahmed al-Dalati said that security forces had conducted coordinated raids in Damascus and its countryside, including areas such as al-Qutayfah, Sayyidah Zaynab, Qudsaya, and Ash al-Warwar, and had captured an Islamic State-linked cell they claimed were responsible for the attacks.

== Reactions ==
According to ACLED, the bombings "overshadowed Macron's visit to Syria and raised questions about the government’s ability to prevent terrorist attacks in the capital." Macron expressed solidarity with those injured in the Damascus bombings and stressed the need to remain uncompromising on security, saying the attacks should not destabilize Syria or undermine the path toward reconstruction and stability. International and regional condemnations and expressions of solidarity came from Egypt, Jordan, Kuwait, Lebanon, Oman, Palestine, Qatar, Saudi Arabia, Turkey, the United Arab Emirates, the Gulf Cooperation Council, and the Muslim World League.
