= Al-Hammad =

Desert region of West Asia

Al-Hammad Desert
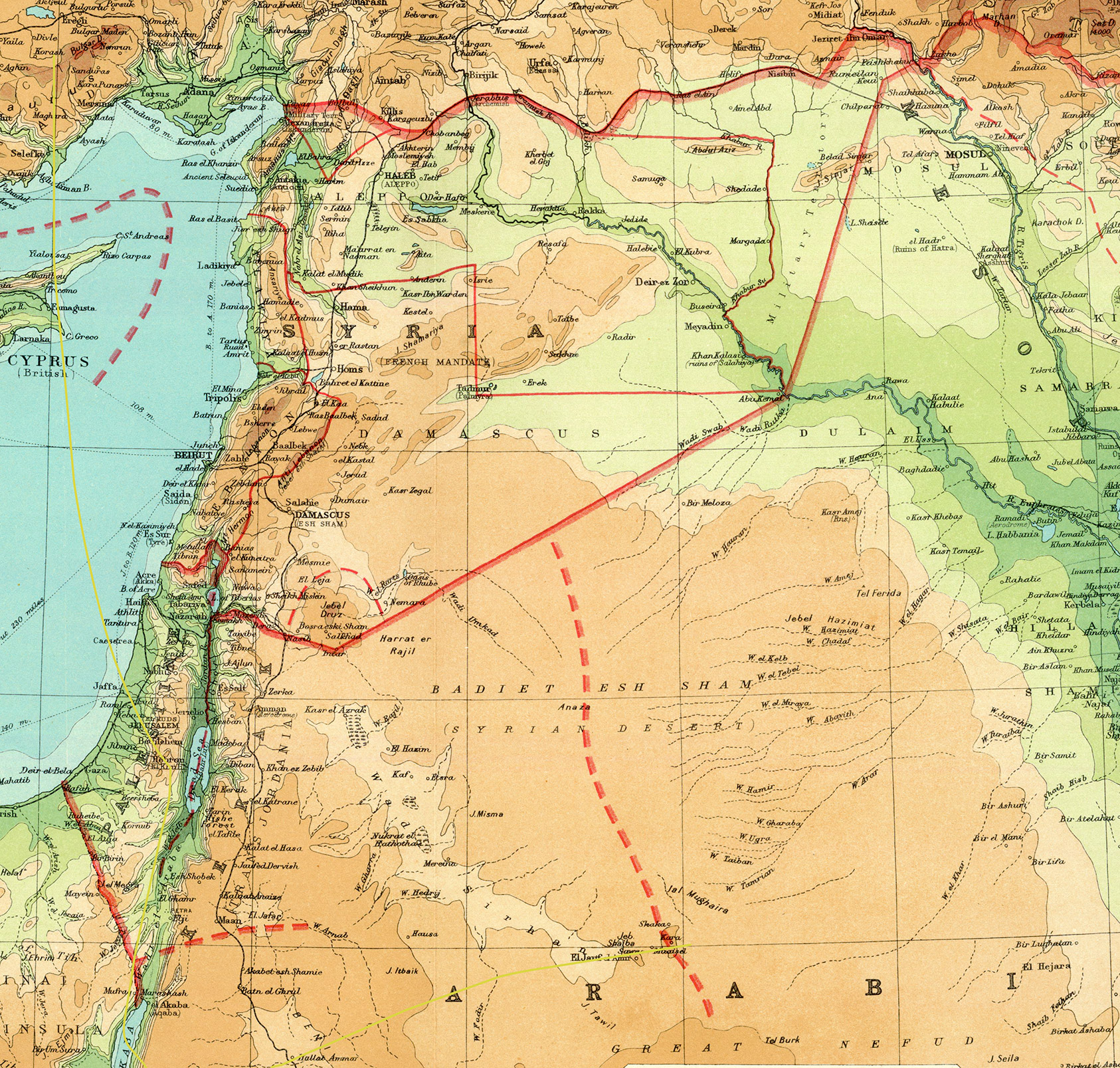
- 1922 map of the Levant; Al-Hammad is the plateau labelled Badiet Esh Sham

Highest point
- Peak: 815 km^{2} (315 sq mi)
- Coordinates: 32°49′47″N 38°59′36″E

Dimensions
- Area: 166,000 km^{2} (64,000 sq mi)

Geography
- Location: Iraq, Syria, Jordan, Saudi Arabia

Al-Hammad (Arabic: بادية الحماد, romanized: Bādiyat al-Hammad) is a stony plateau in the Syrian Desert, straddling the borders of Syria, Jordan, Iraq, and Saudi Arabia.
