= 2025 Palmyra ambush =

ISIS attack on US and Syrian troops in Syria

2025 Palmyra attack
- Part of Attacks on US bases during the Middle Eastern crisis (2023–present), War against the Islamic State and the American intervention in the Syrian civil war
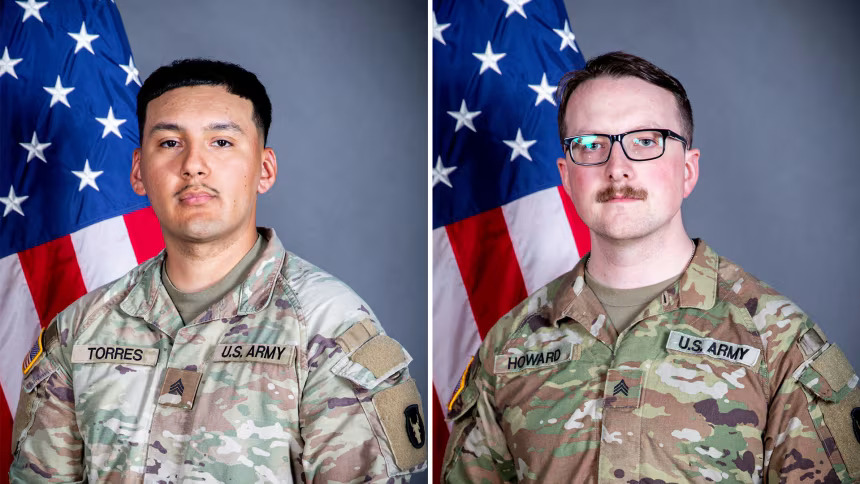
- Edgar Brian Torres-Tovar (left) and William Nathaniel "Nate" Howard (right), the two American soldiers killed in the attack
- Location: Palmyra, Syria
- Date: December 13, 2025
- Target: American and Syrian soldiers
- Attack type: Mass shooting, ambush
- Deaths: 4 (including the perpetrator)
- Injuries: 5
- Assailant: Lone gunman †
- Motive: Islamic extremism

The 2025 Palmyra attack was an ambush carried out on 13 December 2025 against Syrian and US troops stationed near the Syrian city of Palmyra. The attack was conducted by a lone Syrian security officer, affiliated with the Islamic State. The attack resulted in the deaths of two US soldiers (Sergeant Edgar Brian Torres-Tovar and Sergeant William Nathaniel "Nate" Howard, both posthumously promoted to the rank of staff sergeant) and Turkish-US linguist Ayad “Eddie” Mansoor Sakat, which were the first US military casualties in Syria since the fall of the Assad regime.

== Attack ==
On 13 December 2025, a Syrian police officer, suspected of being affiliated with the Islamic State, carried out an ambush attack on Syrian and US troops stationed in Palmyra. The attack occurred a month after Syrian president Ahmed al-Sharaa signed a political cooperation agreement with the United States-led coalition against the Islamic State, which coincided with al-Sharaa's visit to the White House.

The soldiers were stationed for counter-terrorist measures when they came under gunfire by a lone gunman. The gunman was shot and killed by US troops of B Troop 1-113th Cavalry Division. Two Syrian troops were also reported to be wounded. The injured troops were evacuated to the Al-Tanf military base controlled by the United States.

The Syrian Observatory for Human Rights stated that the attacker was a member of the security forces of Syria. Syrian interior minister Noureddine al-Baba in a broadcast interview on the public television of Syria stated that the gunman had been a member of the security forces, whose dismissal for his "extremist" views had been planned for 14 December. He stated that the gunman had infiltrated a meeting between a delegation from the United States to combat the Islamic State and the Syrian Armed Forces.

== Responses ==
U.S. president Donald Trump addressing the press shortly after the attack

Syria arrested five suspects in the shooting of American troops at Palmyra. Syria's Interior Ministry stated that arrests took place in coordination with the international coalition forces and special Syrian units. On 14 December, U.S. Secretary of State Marco Rubio held a discussion about the issue with the Syrian foreign minister Asaad al-Shibani on Sunday.

=== US/Jordanian military response ===
Operation Hawkeye Strike was a retaliatory military action by the United States against the Islamic State, following the December 2025 Palmyra attack by a Syrian police officer, suspected of being affiliated with the Islamic State, that killed two U.S. soldiers and a civilian interpreter.

The US carried out an airstrike northwest Syria on Jan. 16, that resulted in the death of a leader affiliated with Al-Qaeda who had direct ties to the terrorist responsible for an ambush which killed two U.S. service members and an American interpreter on Dec. 13, 2025.

== Reactions ==
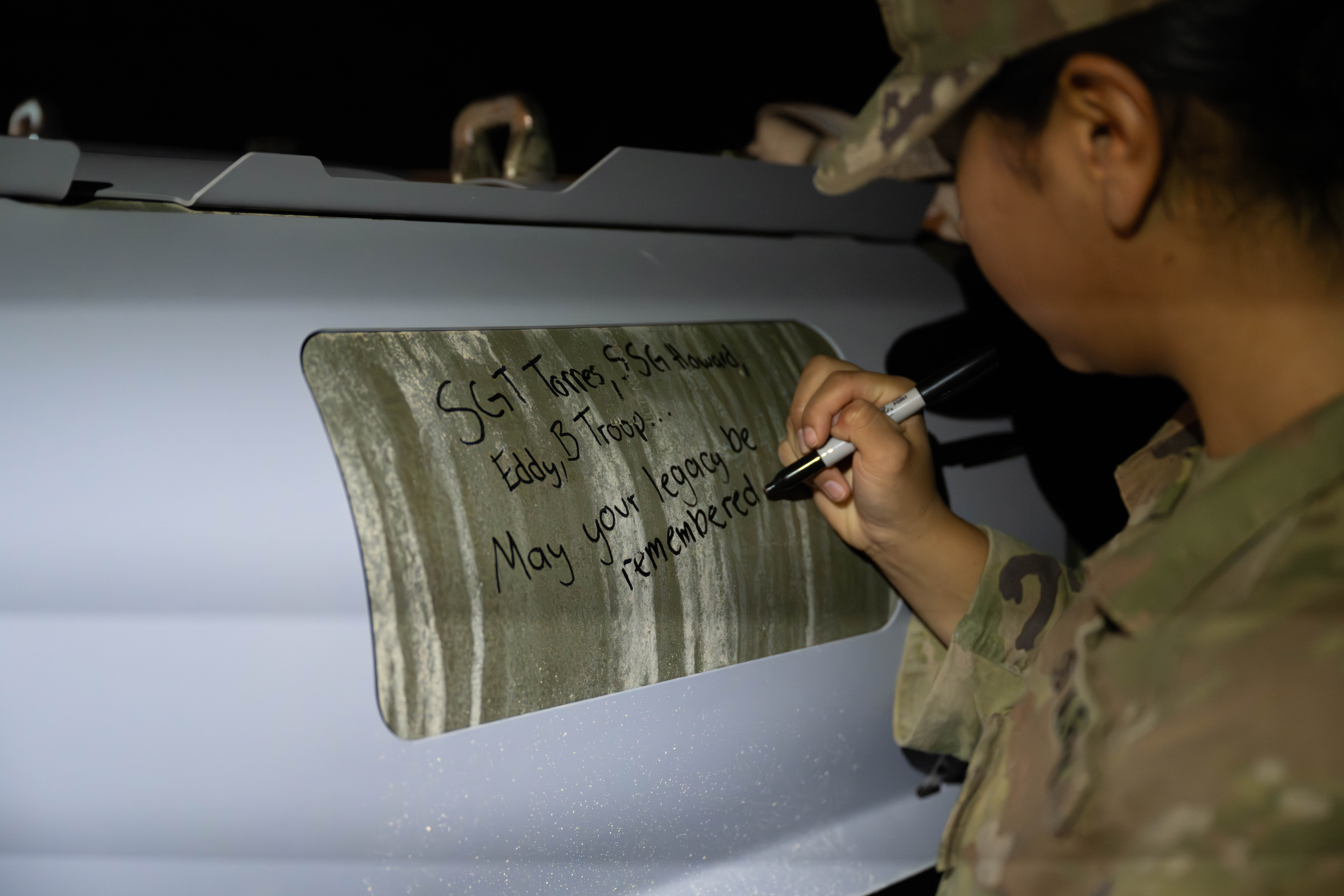
Iowa National Guard soldier signs a GBU-31 JDAM prior to Operation Hawkeye Strike on 18 December 2025

- Syria: President Ahmed al-Sharaa expressed condolences for the victims and vowed to promote stability in the region.
- United States: President Donald Trump blamed ISIL for the attack and vowed retaliation.
- Saudi Arabia: Saudi Arabia expressed strong condemnation of the attack on US and Syrian troops in Palmyra.
- United Arab Emirates: The United Arab Emirates expressed strong condemnation of the incident and called for undermining safety and stability in the region.
- Bahrain: In a statement issued by the Foreign ministry of Bahrain, Bahrain condemned the ISIS attack and expressed solidarity with Syria and the United States.
- Iraq: The foreign ministry of Iraq condemned the attack and stated that "The Ministry of Foreign Affairs condemns the terrorist attack that targeted a joint patrol of Syrian internal security forces and U.S. forces near the city of Palmyra, which resulted in a number of casualties".
- Jordan: The foreign ministry spokesperson Ambassador Fouad al Majali affirmed Syria and the United States with full solidarity of Jordan and condemned the attack.
- Turkey: In an official statement on Sunday, Turkey condemned the attack and expressed condolences for the victims of the Palmyra attack.
