= 2026 New York City protest bombing attempt =

Attempted bombing in New York City

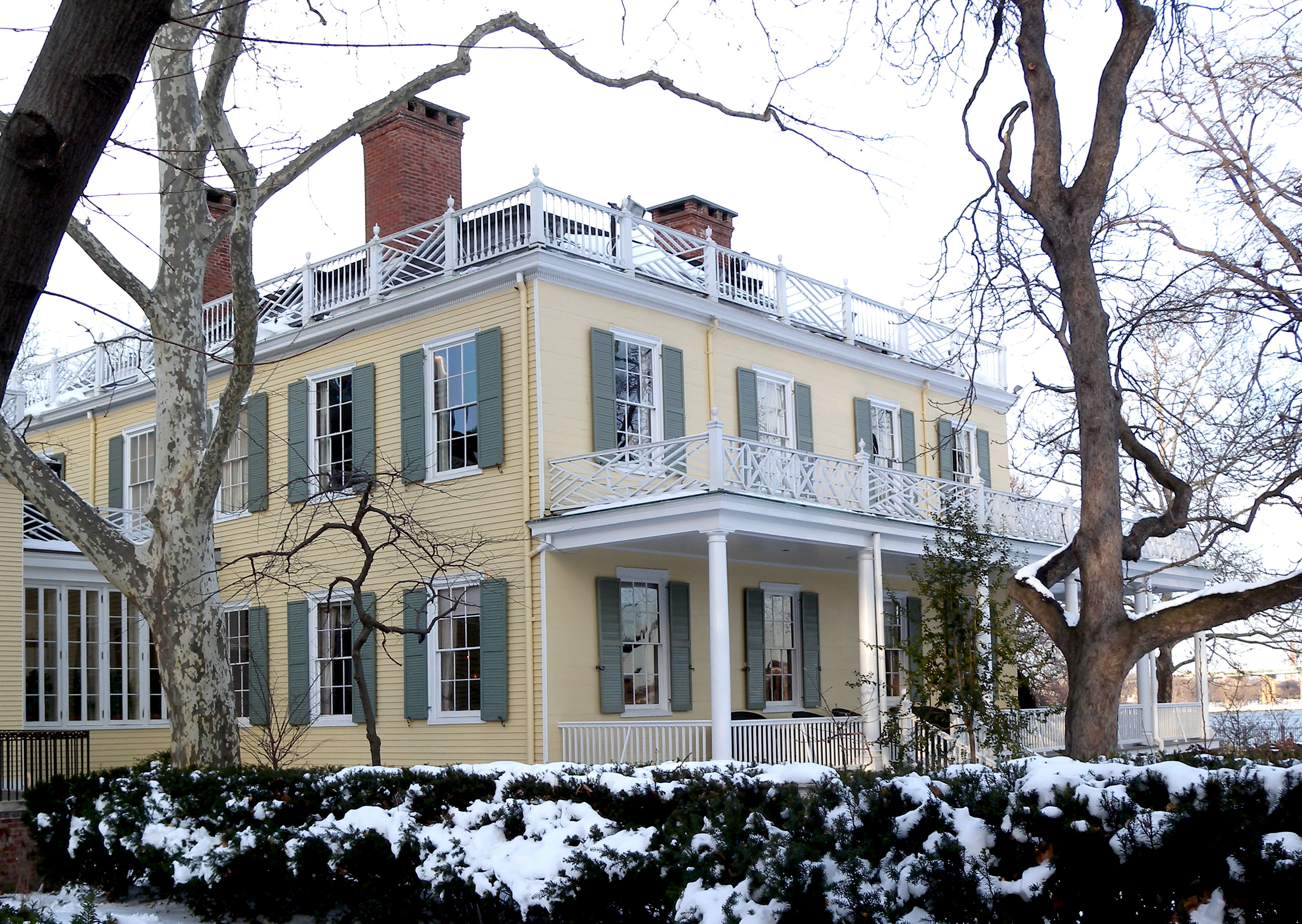
- The east front of Gracie Mansion
- Location: 40.776288°N 73.943634°W; Gracie Mansion, New York City, US
- Date: March 7, 2026
- Attack type: Attempted bombing
- Weapon: Two homemade bombs
- Deaths: 0
- Injuries: 0
- Motive: Under investigation, suspected Islamic State inspiration
- Charges: Terrorism

An attempted bombing occurred on March 7, 2026, outside of Gracie Mansion, the residence of the New York City mayor, in the Yorkville neighborhood on the Upper East Side of Manhattan in New York City, United States. Two men, inspired by Islamic State, from Bucks County, Pennsylvania, allegedly attempted to detonate two bombs in a crowd of people attending the "Stop the Islamic Takeover of New York City" protest held by American far-right activist Jake Lang. Both bombs failed to detonate, and no one was injured in the attack.

== Investigation ==
On March 9, 2026, at a city press conference including Mayor Zohran Mamdani, the New York City police commissioner Jessica Tisch said that the attack was being investigated as an "act of ISIS-inspired terrorism". Tisch identified two suspects from Bucks County, Pennsylvania, one from Langhorne and the other from Newtown, who were taken into custody. Two additional devices were identified at the scene—one dropped by a suspect on the run and one in a parked vehicle a few streets south of the residence. In addition, federal charges were brought by the U.S. Attorney for the Southern District of New York against the two men including "material support and resources to a designated foreign terrorist organization".

Investigators say the attackers were inspired by the Islamic State and wanted the incident to be deadlier than the 2013 Boston Marathon bombing. Police recovered a notebook from the attackers which had alternative targets such as shopping centers.

== Reactions ==
Speaking about the incident, Mayor Mamdani first called the rally itself that had been attacked "appalling". He praised the counter-protestors, which were larger in number than the number of protesters, according to authorities. He then condemned the incident, saying, "Many of the counter-protesters met this display of bigotry peacefully. A few did not. Two men [...] traveled from two different towns in Bucks County and attempted to bring violence to New York City." He also commended the quick action of the NYPD officers and spoke in support of the right to free speech, saying the "right to peaceful protest is sacred. It does not belong only to those we agree with."

== See also ==
- 2026 Invasion Day protest bombing attempt
