= Persecution of journalists in Bangladesh under Muhammad Yunus =

After the resignation of Sheikh Hasina in the aftermath of the July uprising, various cases of official and unofficial persecution and harassment against the journalists were reported throughout the country in the interim government of Muhammad Yunus. According to Ain o Salish Kendra, 294 attacks and harassment took place against journalists in Yunus government, 62 such incidents took place in 2025. Rights and Risks Analysis Group reported 640 journalists were targeted by the interim government, and 118 journalists accreditation of press council were stripped.

Despite these, the government promised to support freedom of the press, while criticizing the media for its role during the revolution against Sheikh Hasina. In the 2025 World Press Freedom Index published by the Reporters Without Borders (RSF), Bangladesh was ranked at 149, up from 165 previously, outperforming regional peers like India and Pakistan.

== Background ==
On 5 August 2024, at around 2:25 p.m., Sheikh Hasina resigned from her position as the Prime Minister of Bangladesh and fled the country on a helicopter with her sister, Sheikh Rehana, to India, arriving in Delhi via Agartala.

On 8 August 2024, Muhammad Yunus took power as the head of the interim government and was sworn into office. Sheikh Hasina's government had suppressed the press during its 15-year rule. There were expectations that press freedom in Bangladesh would improve under the new government.

== History ==
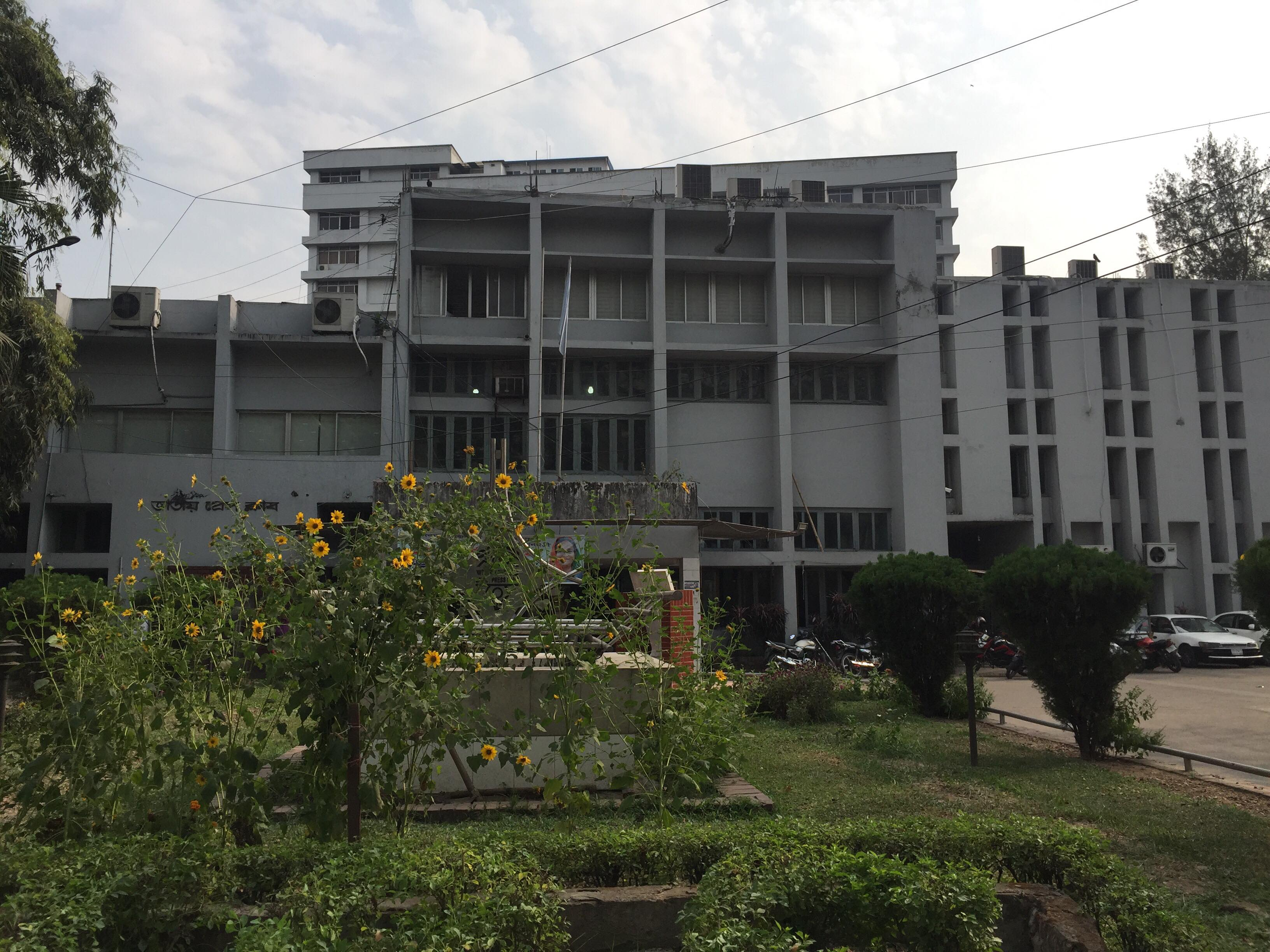
Jatiya Press Club building

During the quota movement protests, mainstream media had begun a campaign of villainizing the protestors.

After the fall of the Sheikh Hasina-led Awami League government, the office of the president and general secretary of the Jatiya Press Club, National Press Club of Bangladesh, was vandalised and forcefully occupied after Abdul Hannan Masud of the quota movement demanded their resignation and banning Awami League-supporting journalists from the profession. The office of Shyamal Dutta of the Jatiya Press Club was vandalised and he was prevented from leaving Bangladesh. On 12 August 2024, A section of Jatiya Press Club's managing committee revoked the memberships of its president, Farida Yasmin, general secretary, Shyamal Dutta and managing committee member, Shahnaj Siddiqui Soma.

A mob attacked and vandalized Chittagong Press Club. On 18 August 2024, the offices of Kaler Kantho and Radio Capital were vandalized at the East West Media Group compound. About 25 vehicles in the media compound were damaged.

In November 2024, editor of the New Age, Nurul Kabir, was harassed twice at Hazrat Shahjalal International Airport. The International Federation of Journalists and Bangladesh Manobadhikar Sangbadik Forum condemned the harassment. Protestors attacked the offices of independent newspapers The Daily Star and Prothom Alo, accusing them of promoting anti-Islamic and pro-India agendas. Reporters Without Borders condemned the assaults and urged the interim government to ensure press freedom.

In December, Coordinator of the Students Against Discrimination Hasnat Abdullah led a group of students and barged into the office of City Group which owns Somoy TV. He had alleged the journalists were engaging in propaganda and twisting his words. After the incident five journalist of the television channel were sacked without any explanation. Muhammad Yunus' press secretary, Shafiqul Alam, stated that the government was not involved in the matter, saying that if any individual took action, the responsibility rested with that person.

The former adviser in charge of the Ministry of Information and Broadcasting, Mahfuj Alam, announced a revenue of all media organizations owned by people affiliated with the Awami League and then take "necessary actions". He also announced that the government would form a task force to "improve quality" of newspapers in Bangladesh. Media Reform Commission head Kamal Ahmed and other members attended the meeting.

A legal team filed a complaint with the UN over the continued detention of Bangladeshi journalists Farzana Rupa and Shakil Ahmed, calling the charges politically motivated and arbitrary.

Security forces attacked journalist Milan Tripura in Khagrachhari District and forced him to delete his footage. The Committee to Protect Journalists called for an investigation into the incident.

=== Press accreditation ===
The government of Bangladesh revoked the press credentials of 167 journalists. There was no explanation for the revocations. This move was condemned by human rights organizations. The government explained that "the revoked cards would not prevent the journalists from working but it would limit their access to the official government building." The accreditation were issued by the Press Information Department. The Bangladesh Financial Intelligence Unit started targeting bank accounts of journalists following a request from the Ministry of Information.

=== Criminal charges ===
Around 140 journalists have been accused in cases filed over the death of protestors against Prime Minister Sheikh Hasina. In one case, the name of journalist Mohammad Nesar Uddin was added to the list of accused while the plaintiff did not even know the journalist. Critics have argued the case were not based on evidence. According to Irene Khan, journalists have faced politically motivated and dubious charges, including murder and terrorism, with many held in prolonged arbitrary detention, reflecting a continuing pattern of impunity toward the persecution of the media.

=== Closure of media organizations ===
Bhorer Kagoj which began publication on 15 February 1992 and was led by founding editor Nayeemul Islam Khan. In January 2025, the owners stopped the print edition of Bhorer Kagoj following protests by employees some of whom were linked to the Bangladesh Nationalist Party (BNP). After the fall of the Sheikh Hasina led Awami League government and the detention of editor Shyamal Dutta some journalists backed by the BNP had been trying to establish control over the newspaper. Shyamal Dutta has been in jail since September 2024. The interim government delisted the newspaper in April 2025.

In August 2025, Daily Janakantha became the subject of a dispute over its editorial control, following allegations by editor and publisher Shamima A Khan that a rival group of staff, backed by retired army officer and former Directorate General of Forces Intelligence (DGFI) Major Afizur Rahman, had staged a takeover of the newspaper's office. Critics also linked him to businessman Chowdhury Nafeez Sarafat and former state minister Mohammad A. Arafat, as well as to prior attempts to influence journalist union elections. Rahman denied the allegations, asserting that his actions were in line with official directives and not personal initiatives.

On 5 August 2024, Somoy TV abruptly ceased transmissions temporarily shortly after the resignation of Sheikh Hasina after being attacked and vandalized by mobs. The channel later went back on the air. On 10 August 2024, it was reported that the managing director and chief executive of Somoy, Ahmed Jobaer, was relieved from his position and replaced by Shampa Rahman. This decision was taken after a meeting of Somoy's Board of Directors. Jobaer later clarified that the license of Somoy was in his name and, according to regulations, he must be in charge of the main operations. He also stated that he would go to court to challenge the decision. Somoy later denied sacking Jobaer, calling the board meeting "illegal" on its web portal. Justices Naima Haider and Sashanka Shekhar Sarkar of the High Court Division ordered Somoy to suspend broadcasts for a week following a writ petition filed by Shampa Rahman, the managing director of the television channel. Somoy went off the air on television at 23:59 (BST) on 19 August 2024, although it continued its operations online. Somoy resumed television broadcasts under new management on 26 August at 23:59 (BST).

On 29 April Deepto TV temporarily suspended its news broadcasting, citing internal reforms. The decision followed public controversy involving a reporter from the channel, Mizanur Rahman, who faced backlash for a question posed to Adviser of Cultural Affairs Mostofa Sarwar Farooki regarding the number of 1,400 July martyrs. It also terminated two journalists. Government officials claimed that the state did not impose the suspension. ATN Bangla also took action against a report from the same conference for questioning Farooki.

== Notable cases ==
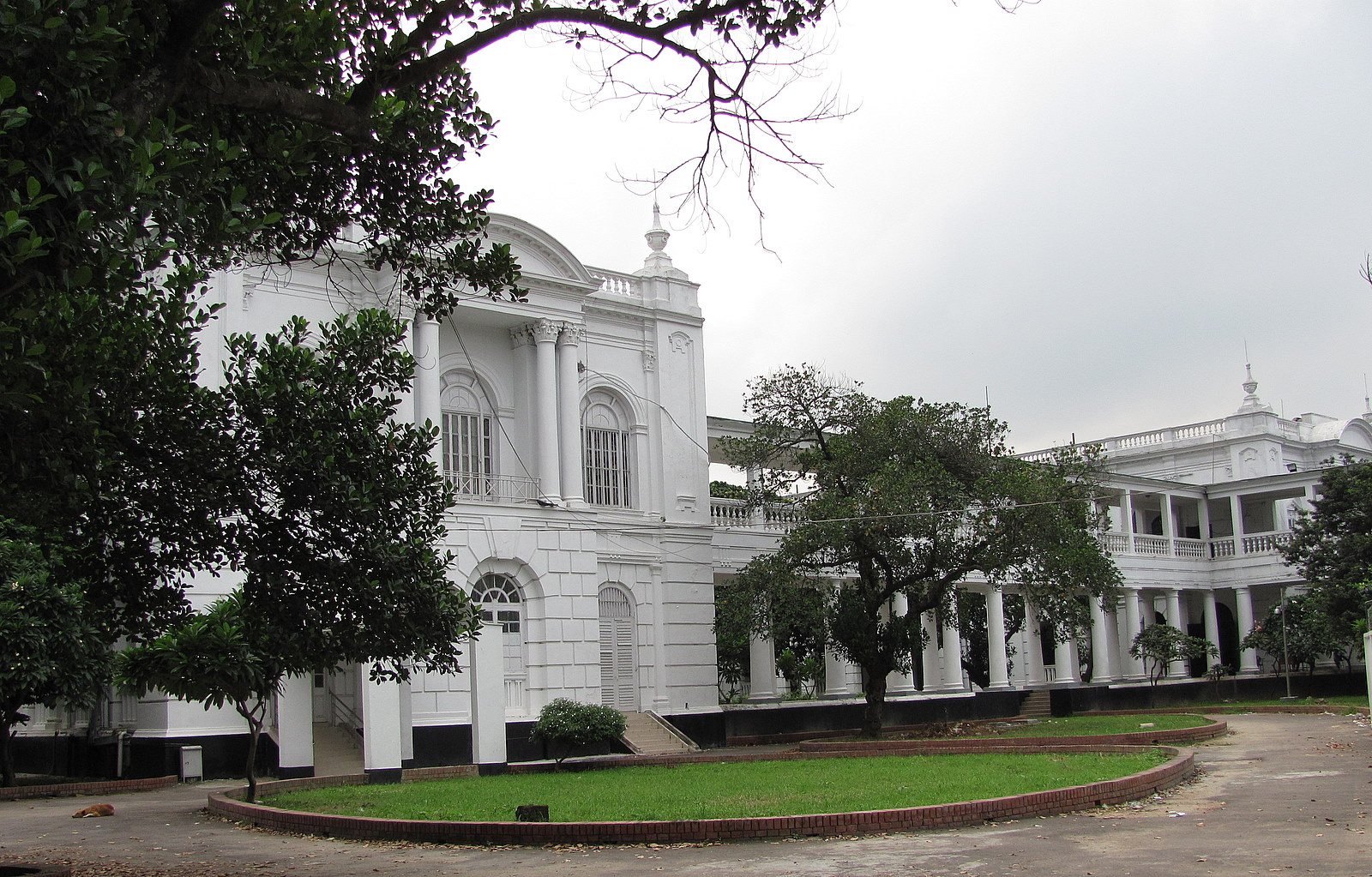
The International Crimes Tribunal

The International Crimes Tribunal Investigation agency has accused Shyamal Dutta, editor of the Bhorer Kagoj, of inciting murder, genocide, and torture during the 2024 Bangladesh quota reform movement. In addition, a case was filed against him in connection with the murder of Mohammad Fazlu, which occurred in Dhaka's Bhashantek area during the Students Against Discrimination protests. On 6 March 2025, Shyamal Dutta was detained near the Dhobaura border in Mymensingh while allegedly attempting to cross into India. On 23 September 2025, a Dhaka court rejected his bail application and ordered him to be sent to jail. Prior to the rejection of his bail, Dutta had been placed on a seven-day remand for interrogation related to the murder case.

Gazi MH Tamim filed a case of genocide at the International Crimes Tribunal against Mozammel Haque Babu, former prime minister Sheikh Hasina, former prosecutor of the International Crimes Tribunal Tureen Afroz, journalist Shahriar Kabir, professor of the University of Dhaka Muntassir Mamoon and 15 others over the police raid on 2013 Shapla Square protests of Hefazat-e-Islam Bangladesh. Other accused were journalist Subhash Singha Roy, convener of Gonojagoron Moncho Imran H Sarkar, journalist Ahmed Jobaer, journalist Nayeemul Islam Khan, former director general of National Security Intelligence M. Manzur Ahmed, and Aziz Ahmed, chief of Bangladesh Army. Babu is currently in jail on charges of abetting genocide, crimes against humanity, and murder during the protests.

Nayeemul Islam Khan is a Bangladeshi journalist and former press secretary to prime minister Sheikh Hasina. On 3 March 2025, the Bangladesh Financial Intelligence Unit ordered the freezing of the personal and institutional bank accounts of Khan, his wife Nasima Khan Monty, and their children. The directive was issued to all banks and financial institutions in Bangladesh. On the same day, the Anti-Corruption Commission obtained a court order to seize the tax files of Khan and his wife. Khan was named as an accused in a case filed over the death of Sajjad Hossain, a student who was shot during the protests in Rangpur. The case also named Hasina, her sister Sheikh Rehana, and journalist Subhash Singha Roy, among others. Additionally, another case was filed at Jatrabari Police Station in connection with the death of Nayeem Howlader, a student who was shot during the protests. The case accused Hasina and seven journalists, including Khan.

Subhash Singha Roy is a Bangladeshi journalist and politician. He is a recipient of the Bangla Academy Literary Award. He is the editor of the news website ABnews24.com. The Students Against Discrimination demanded Roy be expelled from the Jatiya Press Club on 10 August 2025 following the fall of the Sheikh Hasina-led Awami League government. This was criticized as an attack on the freedom of the press. Roy was sued along with 25 journalists at the International Crimes Tribunal for crimes against humanity.

Julfikar Ali Manik is a Bangladeshi journalist and writer, who has been accused in a murder case filed over the death of a protestor along with 164 others including seven other journalists.

Sumi Khan is a Bangladeshi investigative journalist known for her reporting on minority persecution and political affairs in Bangladesh. She was forced into exile in February 2025 due to increasing threats from radical Islamist groups. Previously, she had also faced intimidation from the Bangladesh Jamaat-e-Islami, which she alleges has significant influence over the Muhammad Yunus led interim government and media in Bangladesh. She has criticized arrest of journalists Shyamal Dutta and Mozammel Haque Babu, as well as the revocation of press accreditations for over 160 journalists by the new regime. She alleges that the government has empowered the Bangladesh Jamaat-e-Islami to take control of the media in Bangladesh.

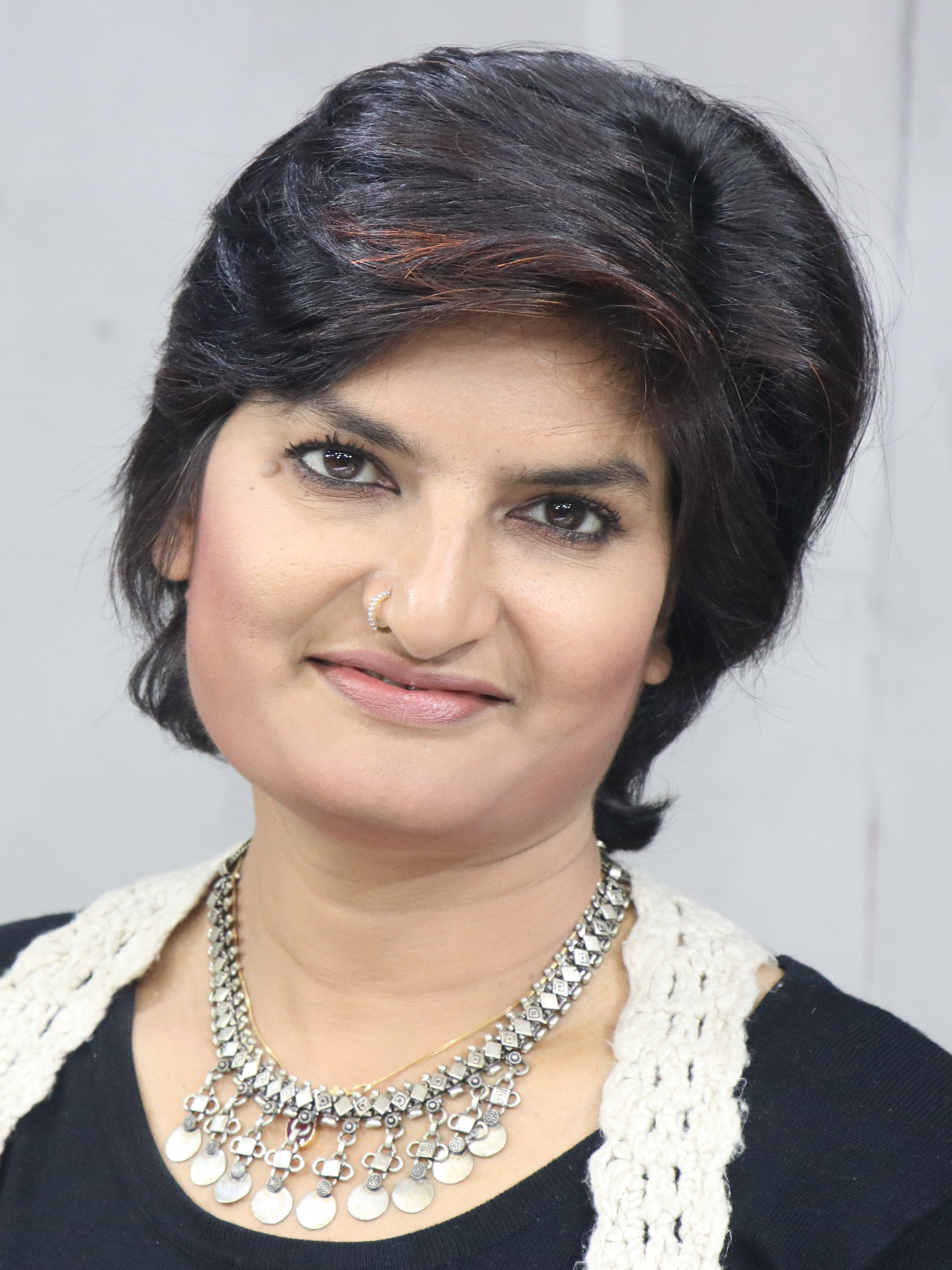
Munni Saha

Munni Saha is a Bangladeshi journalist and television host. From 2016 to 2023, she was the editor-in-chief of ATN News, a broadcast news TV channel in Bangladesh. Saha was charged with crimes against humanity, along with several other journalists. The charges were linked to a murder case filed during the July massacre. In December 2024, she was verbally attacked by a mob, which accused her of attempting to make Bangladesh a part of India.

On 21 August 2024, Farzana Rupa, former principal correspondent of Ekattor TV. was detained at Hazrat Shahjalal International Airport in connection with a murder case filed at Uttara East Police Station. On 5 March 2025, during a court appearance, she stated, "I am a journalist. One murder case is enough to hang me," and expressed the desire to represent herself for bail, citing a lack of legal representation. Rupa was sent to jail by the magistrate along with Farzana Shakila and Sumu Chowdhury after rejecting their bail petition. Her legal team filed a complaint with the United Nations. Her husband and journalist, Shakil Ahmed, was detained with her. On 8 August 2024, Shakil Ahmed was dismissed from his position at Ekattor TV. A statement from Mustafa Azad, on behalf of the channel's management, confirmed their dismissal.

Anis Alamgir, a veteran Bangladeshi journalist was arrested in December 2025 after publicly criticizing the interim administration led by Muhammad Yunus. He was detained by the Detective Branch of the Dhaka Metropolitan Police from the Dhanmondi area of Dhaka shortly after leaving a gym. Authorities later showed him arrested in a case filed under the Anti‑Terrorism Act. A Dhaka court subsequently granted police several days of remand for interrogation. The arrest drew criticism from international press-freedom groups, including the Committee to Protect Journalists and Amnesty International, which argued that using anti-terrorism legislation against a journalist for critical commentary undermines freedom of expression and press freedom in Bangladesh.

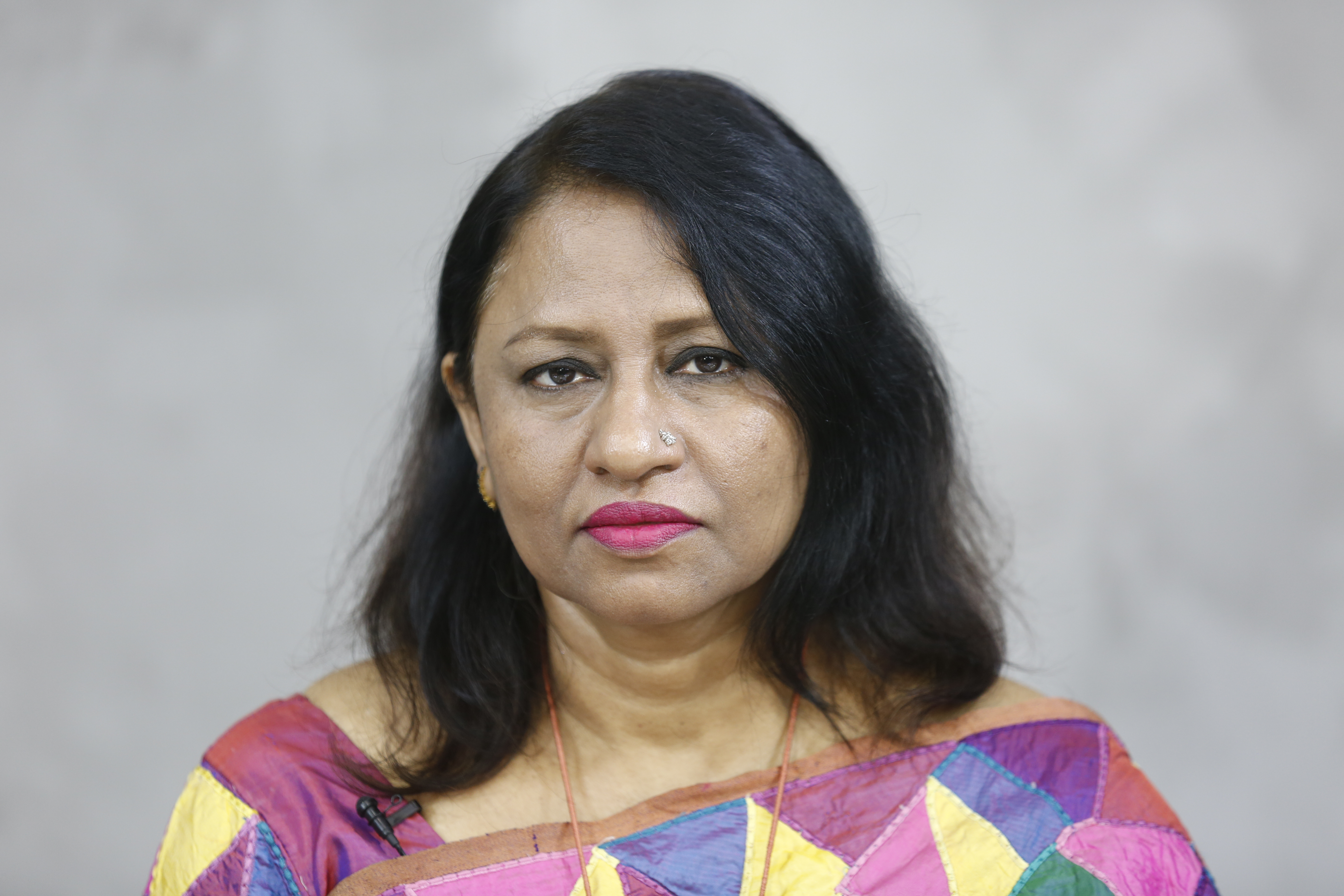
Farida Yasmin is the first female president of the Jatiya Press Club. She was forcefully removed from the Jatiya Press Club, and her membership was revoked.

=== Attacks on The Daily Star and Prothom Alo ===
On 19 December 2025, coordinated attacks targeted the offices of The Daily Star and Prothom Alo in Dhaka amid unrest following the death of Sharif Osman Hadi. Late on 18 December, groups of protesters gathered near Shahbagh and later moved toward the Prothom Alo office in Karwan Bazar, where parts of the building were vandalised and documents were set on fire. Shortly after midnight, another group attacked The Daily Star office near Farmgate, breaking glass panels, removing office items, and setting fires. Several staffs were trapped inside during the incidents. Security forces, including army personnel were deployed to assist with evacuations and restore order. Yunus administration condemned the attacks and launched investigations, with law enforcement agencies examining CCTV footage and other information to identify the suspects. Publication of the two media was stopped for several days following the attacks.

A case filed by the Prothom Alo accused 400-500 unnamed people, and the Daily Star accused 350-400 unnamed attackers. Police and other agencies later carried out operations across the country, identifying at least 31 suspects and making multiple arrests. By 23 December 2025, more than two dozen people had been detained, and continued operations brought the total number of arrests to 37 across cases related to both newspaper offices. Several suspects were remanded for questioning, while others were sent to jail following court proceedings.

Interim government led by Muhammad Yunus was highly criticised by news media for failing to respond immediately to disperse the mob during the incidents.

== Reactions ==
Workers Party of Bangladesh politician, Sharif Shamshir said:

The persecutions took place, not because they committed any real crime but because they were considered to be allies of the Hasina government and their fate depends on how the parties close to the new system think about them in the end.

— Sharif Shamshir

President of Overseas Correspondents Association Bangladesh, Nazrul Islam Mithu said:

The government urges journalists to criticize them. But they are not ensuring conditions conducive to healthy journalism. An atmosphere of fear is prevailing.

— Nazrul Islam Mithu

Journalist Robaet Ferdous said:

People thought the situation would change after Aug. 5. But the situation has not changed. Now, the students have replaced the government agencies deciding who would go to TV talk shows or not, and Theoretically, an atmosphere of free journalism exists, but not in practice.

— Robaet Ferdous

Mahfuz Anam, editor of The Daily Star mocked the lawsuits against journalists, saying:

Bangladesh must be the country with the highest number of murder suspects masquerading as journalists in the whole world.

— Mahfuz Anam

William Horsley, Executive Committee member of the Commonwealth Journalists Association said:

Despite Nobel laureate Muhammad Yunus's claims of media freedom under Bangladesh’s interim government, journalists continue to face arrests, threats, and censorship, with critics calling it a retaliatory purge.

— William Horsley

Beh Lih Yi, Asia program coordinator at the Committee to Protect Journalists said:

We are disturbed by the apparently baseless detentions and criminal cases against journalists, and incidents of media groups' offices being targeted and vandalized. These assaults on press freedom must end. They create a chilling effect on the media.

— Beh Lih Yi

- Dhaka Reporters Unity condemned the filing of murder charge against 25 journalists, including President of the Dhaka Reporters Unity Syed Shukkur Ali Shuvo on 11 September 2024.
- Committee to Protect Journalists it was "alarmed by the apparently baseless criminal cases lodged against Bangladeshi journalists in retaliation for their work, which is seen as supportive of the recently ousted government."
- Reporters Without Borders, Transparency International Bangladesh, and Editors' Council condemned the revocation of press credentials of 167 journalists by the Press Information Department. Reporters Without Borders called for the withdrawal of unfounded murder charges against journalists and end of judicial harassment.
- Article 19 called on the Interim government to protect freedom of expression and stated the Cyber Protection Ordinance 2025, made to replace the Cyber Security Act, did not adhere to international human rights standards.
- UNESCO-International Programme for the Development of Communication and News Network has started a program for safety of journalists working in Dhaka. It also asked the government to ensure the safety of journalists.

== Dismissal of suppression claims ==
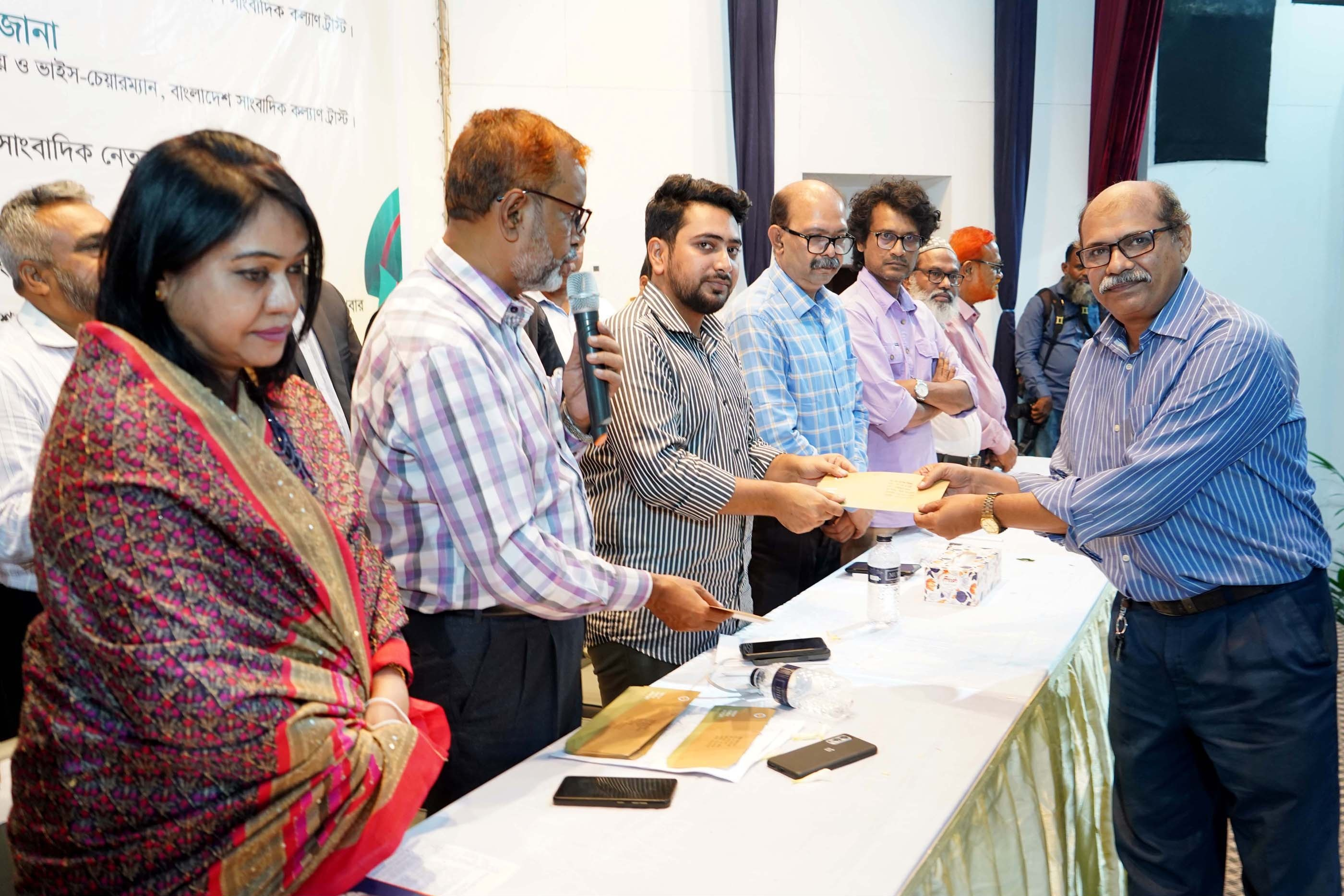
Nahid Islam, as the advisor on Information and Broadcasting, in presence of Faruk Wasif, distributing financial assistance to the families of deceased journalists and to injured and indigent journalists.

In response to the criticism, Shafiqul Alam, Press Secretary of the Interim government, in a statement said that the accusation of press suppression "mischaracterizes a deeply complex political transition and underplays the efforts being made to build the rule of law in the aftermath of state-sponsored authoritarianism."

Shafiqul Alam, Press Secretary of the Interim government said:

The government will not hinder press freedom.

— Shafiqul Alam

The government established the Media Reform Commission which provided recommendation to the government on improving the media in Bangladesh.

Yunus acknowledged that the murder charges against over 140 journalists were hastily filed under outdated laws and pledged to halt such actions while forming a review committee. He also stated that while the revoked press accreditations restrict access to government buildings they did not prevent journalists from working. The Yunus government established a Press Wing Facts to fact-check news but critics questioned the role of the government as the arbitrator of truth.

== See also ==
- Persecution of journalists in Bangladesh under Sheikh Hasina
- Interim government of Muhammad Yunus
- Human rights in Bangladesh
