= Riaz Uddin Ahmed =

Bangladeshi journalist (1945–2021)

- রিয়াজ উদ্দিন আহমেদ

President of Jatiya Press Club
- In office 1995–1998

Personal details
- Born: 30 November 1945 Narandi, Manohardi, Narsingdi
- Died: 25 December 2021 (aged 76) United Hospital, Dhaka
- Education: University of Dhaka
- Awards: Ekushey Padak- 1993

Riaz Uddin Ahmed (30 November 1945 – 25 December 2021) was a Bangladeshi journalist who was the president of the National Press Club. In 1993, he was awarded the Ekushey Padak, the state's second highest civilian honor, for his outstanding contribution to journalism. He was the editor of News Today. He was an advisor to former Prime Minister of Bangladesh Khaleda Zia.

== Early life ==
Riaz Uddin Ahmed was born on 30 November 1945, in the village of Narandi, Manohardi, Narsingdi. He passed MA in economics from University of Dhaka in 1986 and LLB in 1982. His only son is Mashroor Riaz, a former World Bank official and chairman of the Policy Exchange.

== Career ==
He taught for a while before joining the Pakistan Observer in 1968. In 1970, he was a member of the executive council of the then East Pakistan Journalists Union. He resigned from the Pakistan Observer on 25 March 1971 and joined the war of liberation. After independence, he again joined the Observer and worked until November 1990.

He was the General Secretary of Dhaka Union of Journalists from 1973 to 1978. From 1978 to 1984, he was the Secretary General of the Bangladesh Federal Union of Journalists. He was the President of Bangladesh Federal Union of Journalists from 1986 to 1992.

He was the chairman of the South Asia Coordinating Council of Journalists, formed in May 1992 by the SAARC Federation of Journalists. He was the President of the National Press Club from 1995 to 1998. He was the deputy editor of The Daily Star. In 1991, he was the editor of The Daily Telegraph. He was the editor of News Today. He was the editor-in-chief of The Financial Express.

In 1993, he was awarded the Ekushey Padak, the state's second highest civilian honor, for his outstanding contribution to journalism.

== Books ==
Among the books published by Riaz Uddin Ahmed are: -

- Every day in search of truth

== Awards and honors ==
- Ekushey Padak-1993
- Sher-e-Bangla Padak
- Maulana Akram Khan Gold Medal
- Narsingdi Press Club Gold Medal
- Anti-Drug Federation Gold Medal

== Death ==
After contracting COVID-19, during the COVID-19 pandemic in Bangladesh, Riaz was taken to United Hospital, Dhaka where he died on 25 December 2021.
