= Farida Yasmin (journalist) =

Bangladeshi journalist and politician

- ফরিদা ইয়াসমিন
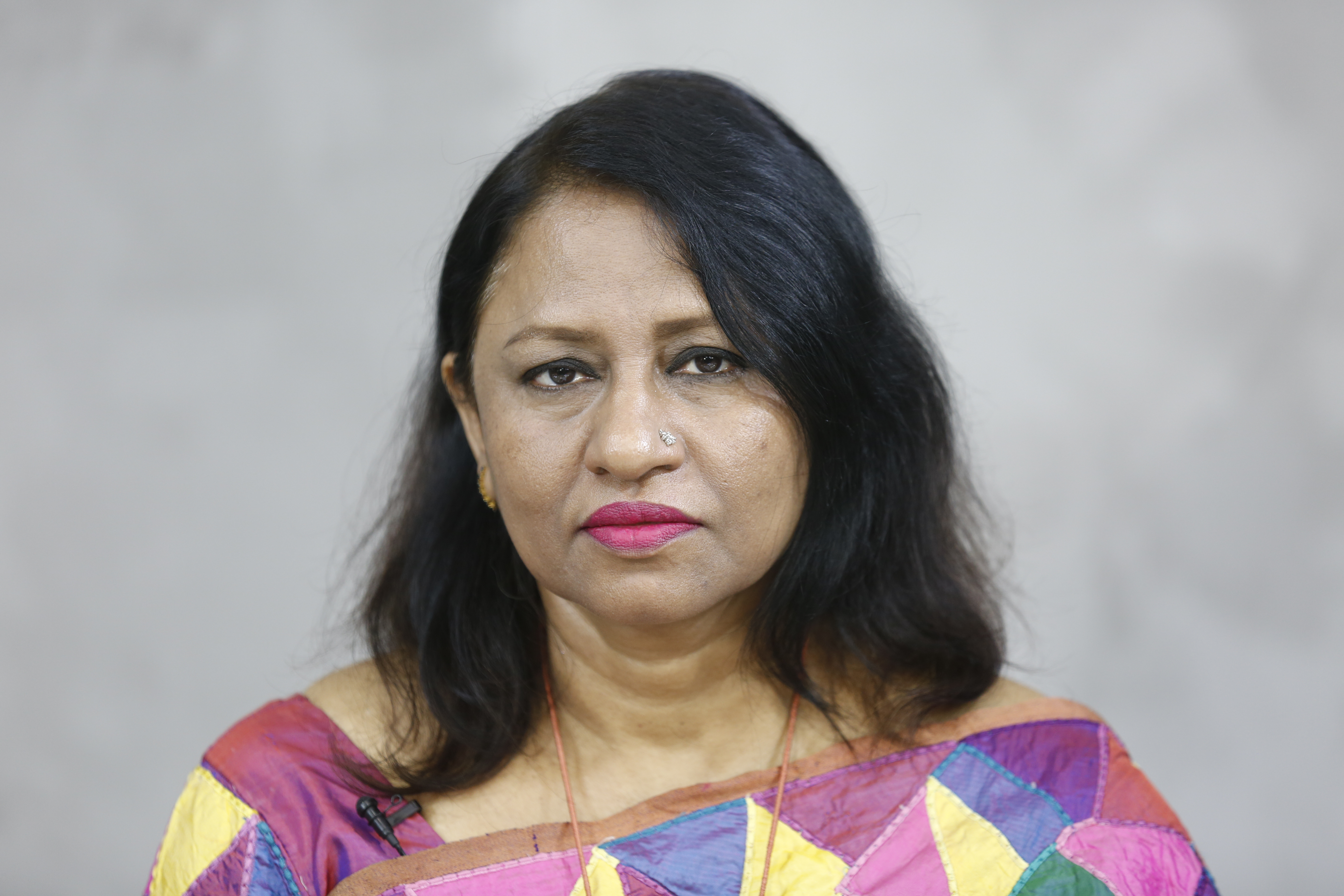
- Yasmin in 2018

Member of the Bangladesh Parliament for Reserved Women's Seat–35
- In office 28 February 2024 – 6 August 2024

Personal details
- Born: Farida Yasmin Bulbul; 1 June 1963 (age 63) Narsingdi, East Pakistan, Pakistan
- Spouse: Naem Nizam (m. 1990)
- Children: 2
- Education: University of Dhaka
- Occupation: Journalist and editor
- Known for: her tenure senior sub-editor of The Daily Ittefaq and joint secretary of Bangladesh National Press Club
- Awards: Women lead the nation award, Bangladesh Mahila Parishad award
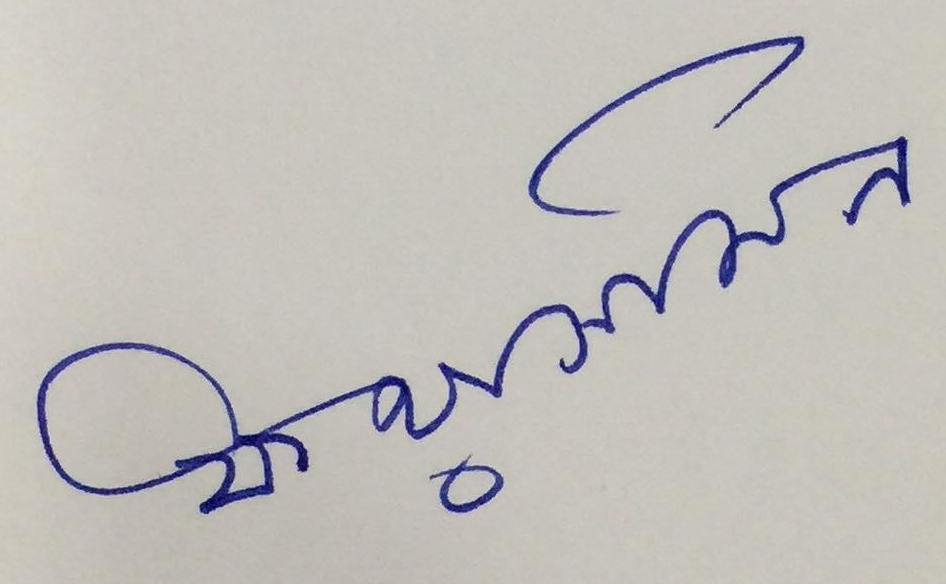
- Signature

Farida Yasmin (born 1 June 1963) is a Bangladeshi journalist, and former president of the Jatiya Press Club. She was the first female president of the National Press Club. Twice elected president of the press club, she was holding that position from the year 2020 to August 2024. She is a former senior journalist of The Daily Ittefaq and former general secretary of Bangladesh National Press Club. In 2017, she was elected the first female general secretary of Bangladesh Press Club. She has also been a former joint secretary of Jatiya Press Club.

== Early life and education ==
Her father is Shakhawar Hossain Bhuiyan and her mother is Jahanara Hossain. She was the student of Shibpur Girls High School, Narsingdi. She passed SSC exam from Shibpur Girls High School and HSC exam from Eden Mohila College. Yasmin completed a master's from University of Dhaka.

== Career ==
Yasmin was elected joint secretary of the NPC in 2011, and 2012. She is the joint secretary of South Asian Women's Media Forum and was a founding member of the forum. She spoke for keeping the age of marriage in Bangladesh at 18 for women. She was shift in charge at The Daily Ittefaq.

In 2016, Yasmin was made the vice-president of Dhaka University Mass Communication and Journalism Alumni Association. She was elected general secretary of Jatiya Press Club on 1 January 2017, she was first female general secretary of the Jatiya Press Club. She was re-elected to the post of general secretary of the Jatiya Press Club on 18 December 2018. She is the editor and publisher of womeneye24.com.

On 31 December 2020, Yasmin was elected president of Jatiya Press Club, the first woman to be elected president. She received 581 votes while her rival, Kamal Uddin Sabuj, received 395 votes. Bangladesh Financial Intelligence Unit opened an investigation into her accounts, and the accounts of other elected leaders of the Press Club, Dhaka Union of Journalists, and Bangladesh Federal Union of Journalists in September 2021. She criticized the government for investigating elected leaders of the journalist community and questioned why an investigation without any complaints against the journalists. This was around the time the government was looking into the account of reporter Rozina Islam of Prothom Alo who had been arrested in May. Yasmin had met Home Minister Asaduzzaman Khan Kamal criticizing the harassment of Rozina, sought her bail, and said, "We want justice, no one has the right to harass anyone (Rozina) like this".

Yasmin was re-elected on 31 December 2022 with 567 votes while Kamal Uddin Sabuj received 401 votes.

Yasmin was appointed to the women's reserved seat for Narsingdi by the Awami League in February 2024.

== Published books ==
- Basha Andolon o nari, 2005
- Ujjal Narir Mukhomukhi, 2005
- Itehasher Aynay Bangabandhu, 2017

== See also ==
Persecution of Journalists under Bangladesh's Interim Government (2024–25)
