= Mubashar Hasan =

Bangladeshi political scientist

- মোবাশ্বার হাসান
- Born: Dhaka, Bangladesh
- Occupations: Human rights defender, Political scientist
- Employer: North South University
- Known for: Research on terrorism, extremism, and democracy
- Website: mubasharhasan.com

Mubashar Hasan (Bengali: মোবাশ্বার হাসান; pseudonym: Caesar), is a Bangladeshi researcher, political scientist, and assistant professor of Political Science at North South University in Dhaka. He is known for his research on democracy, political Islam, terrorism, and the rise of violent religious extremism in Bangladesh. He was one of many victims of enforced disappearance in Bangladesh under the Sheikh Hasina led Awami League government.

== Early life and education ==
Hasan's father is Motahar Hossain. He completed his Bachelor of Social Sciences in Mass Communication and Journalism from the University of Dhaka. He then earned an MSc in Politics from the University of Dundee and a Master of Letters from the Al-Maktoum Institute of Islamic and Arabic Studies at Aberdeen University. He later completed his PhD at the School of Government and International Relations, Griffith University.

== Career ==
Before entering academia, Hasan worked as a journalist and media campaign strategist for Oxfam in both Bangladesh and Pakistan. He also consulted for the Government of Bangladesh's Access to Information (a2i) project. He founded Alochonaa.com, an interactive blog promoting multiculturalism and critical dialogue about politics and society in Bangladesh.

In 2016, Hasan said ethical journalism and credible news sourcing are essential for democracy, especially amid increasing political intolerance and media suppression in Bangladesh. He was an assistant professor of the Media Studies and Journalism Department of the University of Liberal Arts Bangladesh.

=== Abduction and release ===
In September 2017, Hasan was invited by the United States Department of State to speak at a seminar on terrorism in the United States.

On 7 November 2017, Hasan went missing in Dhaka after attending a meeting at the United Nations Development Programme office. His disappearance sparked international concern, particularly due to his research into Islamic militancy. He had previously expressed concern about his safety after a suspicious individual visited his home in October 2017.

Hasan was abducted while riding in an Uber taxi and was later forced into a van by unidentified men. He was held in captivity for 44 days before being released in the early hours of 20 December 2017. He was blindfolded and dropped on a highway, and later recounted being threatened with death and robbed while in captivity. Upon his release, he was told: “If you look back, we will kill you.” Hasan's abduction was widely condemned by academics and human rights organizations, including Front Line Defenders, which linked the incident to his academic work and human rights advocacy. Robayet Ferdous, Gitiara Nasreen, Zahid Newaz Khan, Shafiqul Alam, Shariful Hasan, and Shushashoner Jonno Nagorik had called for his immediate return.

Hasan is a postdoctoral researcher at the Department of Culture Studies and Oriental Languages of the University of Oslo in Norway. He is a director of the director of the Sydney Policy and Analysis Centre. He is an adjunct research fellow at the Humanitarian and Development Research Initiative at the University of Western Sydney.

== Bibliography ==
- Hasan, Mubashar (27 January 2020). Islam and Politics in Bangladesh. Palgrave Macmillan Singapore. p. 215. doi:10.1007/978-981-15-1116-5. ISBN 978-981-15-1116-5.
- Hasan, Mubashar (2020). Narratives of Bangladesh. Prothoma. p. 183. ISBN 978-9849436195.
- Ruud, Arild Engelsen; Hasan, Mubashar (18 October 2021). Masks of Authoritarianism. Palgrave Macmillan Singapore. p. 250. doi:10.1007/978-981-16-4314-9. ISBN 978-981-16-4314-9.
