= DUJ =

DUJ may refer to:

- Dhaka Union of Journalists, a trade union of journalists based in Dhaka, Bangladesh
- DUJ, the IATA and FAA LID code for DuBois Regional Airport, Clearfield County, Pennsylvania
- Duane Underwood Jr., American baseball player
