= Persecution of journalists in Bangladesh under Sheikh Hasina =

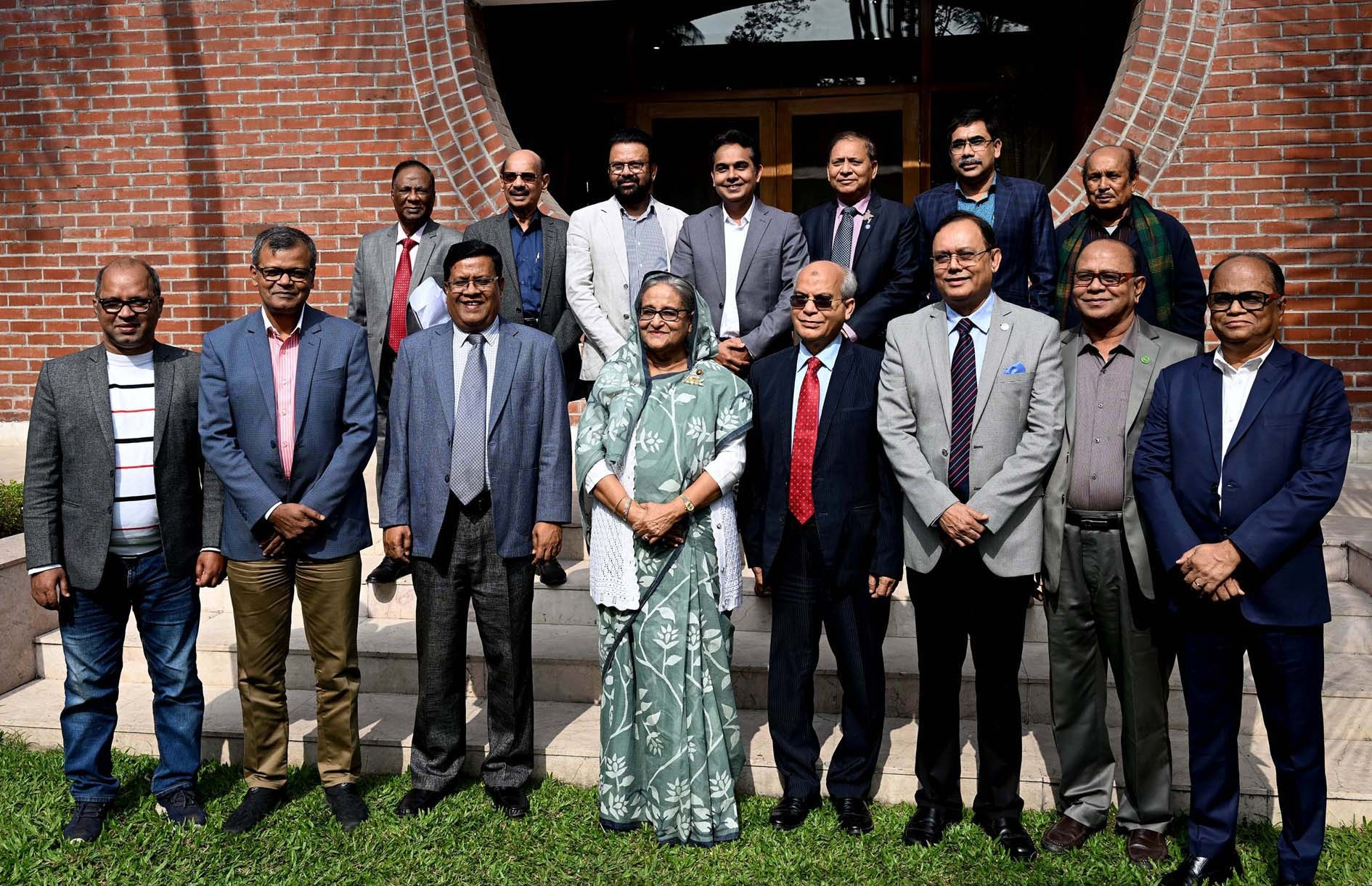
Sheikh Hasina with the members of Bangladesh Federal Union of Journalists, an Awami League aligned trade union of journalists (January 2024)

After Sheikh Hasina took over power following the 2008 general election, many cases of both official and unofficial suppression of journalists and media outlets during the sixteen consecutive years (2009–2024) of Sheikh Hasina's authoritarian rule were reported. Since 2014, Numerous journalists were systematically and judicially punished for challenging her views. In 2021, Reporters Without Borders gave a negative assessment of Hasina's media policy for curbing press freedom in the country.

== Notable incidents ==
=== 83 lawsuits against Mahfuz Anam ===
Mahfuz Anam, the editor of The Daily Star, faced 83 lawsuits filed by members of the Bangladesh Awami League in various courts across the country between 2016 and 2017.

=== Arrest of Shafik Rehman ===
In April 2016, Shafik Rehman, a senior Bangladeshi journalist and former speech writer for former opposition leader Khaleda Zia, was arrested in Dhaka by plain-clothed police officers on allegations of involvement in a plot to assassinate Sajeeb Wazed Joy, the son of Prime Minister Sheikh Hasina. He was sentenced to seven years in prison in 2023.

=== Sagar-Runi murder ===
Journalists Sagar Sarwar and Meherun Runi were killed in their Dhaka residence on 11 February 2012, while their five-year-old son was present in the home. Thirteen years after the incident, the case remains unsolved.

=== Daily Amar Desh ===
The national daily newspaper Amar Desh was forcibly shut down in 2013. Its editor, Mahmudur Rahman, was charged with sedition and accused of publishing a leaked conversation that allegedly led to the resignation of the chief judge of a war crimes tribunal. In 2018, journalist Mahmudur Rahman was assaulted in the courtyard of a Kushtia Upazila courtroom by members of the Bangladesh Chhatra League, the student wing of the ruling party.

=== Digital Security Act ===
The Digital Security Act, 2018, was a digital security law in Bangladesh. The Act was passed with the objective of preventing the spread of racism, sectarianism, extremism, terrorist propaganda, and incitement of hatred against religious or ethnic minorities through social, print, or electronic media. Any content over the Internet or any other media that was deemed pornographic or otherwise inappropriate by the government could be punished by fines or prison terms of various lengths.

The Diplomat expressed feared that the law could be used to suppress dissenters against the government, due to some of its provisions that are vague and ambiguous, open to interpretation or prone to abuse. This law has been used to sue and arrest journalists and activists. It has been described as a "Draconian" law.

The Digital Security Act was repealed in 2023 with the Cyber Security Act, 2023.

=== Death of Mushtaq Ahmed ===
Mushtaq Ahmed, a Bangladeshi writer and an entrepreneur, was arrested on 6 May 2020 under the Digital Security Act (DSA) for a series of social media posts that allegedly criticised the government’s handling of the COVID-19 pandemic. Police charged him with spreading “false rumours” online, defaming the image of Sheikh Mujibur Rahman, and “hurting the spirit of the 1971 Liberation War.” He was denied bail six times while awaiting trial. Ahmed died in police custody on 25 February 2021, prompting widespread criticism from human rights organisations and press freedom groups, including the Committee to Protect Journalists (CPJ), which condemned his detention and called for accountability.

=== Arrest of Shahidul Alam ===
On 5 August 2018, Photojournalist Shahidul Alam was arrested for making what authorities described as “provocative” comments in an Al Jazeera interview about student protests that had gripped Bangladesh for more than a week. According to reports, at around 10 p.m. that evening, at least 20 plain-clothes police officers raided Alam's home in Dhaka, several hours after the interview was broadcast. The following day, he was charged under Section 57 of Bangladesh’s Information and Communication Technology Act, a law that criminalizes electronic communication deemed to “deprave or corrupt” the image of the state. He was released after spending 107 days in prison.

=== Arrest of Rozina Islam ===
On 17 April 2021, Rozina Islam, a senior female reporter of the Bangladeshi daily Prothom Alo, went to the Health Ministry office in the Bangladesh Secretariat for COVID-19 related reporting. She was confined in the ministry for five hours and her cell phones were seized. She was allegedly harassed and assaulted during her detention at the secretariat. She was then arrested from the Ministry for alleged theft and taking photographs of sensitive state documents. Sibbir Ahmed Osmani, Deputy Secretary of the Health Services Division, filed a case against her around midnight of 17 April 2021 with Shahbagh police station under the Official Secrets Act. She was jailed in Dhaka Kashimpur Women's Central Jail amid widespread protests. A virtual hearing for her bail was held on 20 May 2021, later the court announced the decision would be delayed to 23 May 2021, and on that day she was granted a conditional bail after being imprisoned for 7 days.

== See also ==
- Controversies related to Sheikh Hasina
- Human rights in Bangladesh
- Persecution of journalists in Bangladesh under Muhammad Yunus
