= Gitiara Nasreen =

Gitiara Nasreen is a professor of the Department of Mass Communication and Journalism at the University of Dhaka.

== Early life ==
Nasreen completed her PhD at the University of Hawai'i at Manoa in political science and government from 1991 to 1998.

== Career ==
Nasreen wrote Bangladesher Cholochitro Shilpo Sangkote Jonnosongshkriti on cinema of Bangladesh with Fahmidul Haque, which was published in 2008. She has said women in media are marginalized and stereotyped.

In 2013, Nasreen spoke against the Rampal Powerplant due to possible environmental damage to the Sundarban. In 2014, she was a Fulbright scholar at Howard University. She was one of 11 people who sent a legal notice for the revoke Section-57 of the Information and Communication Technology Act, 2006.

Nasreen has been critical of media coverage of terror attacks, saying “We always see that in terrorist attacks, if the attacker is Non Muslim, the media do not focus on religious identity [but] rather describe the attacker as mentally ill or insane,”. She participated in protests calling for the return of Mubashar Hasan, a North South University faculty who was a victim of enforced disappearance and sought the intervention of Prime Minister Sheikh Hasina. In July 2018, she condemned attacks by Bangladesh Chhatra League on quota reform activists of the University of Dhaka. She condemned a death threat issued by extremists to Sultana Kamal, Muntassir Mamoon, and Shahriar Kabir. She called on the election commission to be neutral ahead of the 2018 general election. She called for the release of students detained for participating in the safe road protests.

Nasreen has written and spoken against sexual harassments on campus in Bangladesh. She called for a fair investigation into the death of 15 year old Preeti Urang, maid of Syed Ashfaqul Haque, executive editor of The Daily Star. She called on the media to be more gender sensitive. In 2021, as part of the University Teachers' Network, Nasreen called for "vindictive" measures taken against academics Mahbubul Haque Bhuiyan and Kazi Anis by Comilla University to be revoked. She was a jury of Bangladesh Press Photo Contest 2023. She called on the people of Bangladesh to reject the 7 January 2024 election as part of the University Teachers' Network, Bangladesh.

After the Sheikh Hasina led Awami League government was overthrown, Nasreen laid out some reform proposals as part of the Bangladesh University Teachers' Network. She was appointed member of a newly created Media Reform Commission under Kamal Ahmed.
