= The Dissent =

Bangladeshi digital investigative media outlet

- দ্য ডিসেন্ট
- Logo of The Dissent
- Formation: 2025
- Founder: Qadaruddin Shishir
- Type: Digital investigative news outlet
- Purpose: Investigative journalism, fact-checking and analytical reporting
- Headquarters: Dhaka, Bangladesh
- Fields: Journalism
- Website: thedissent.news

The Dissent (Bengali: দ্য ডিসেন্ট) is a Dhaka-based digital investigative news outlet in Bangladesh. The outlet publishes investigative reports and analyses on disinformation, online campaigns, cybercrime and various contemporary issues. The editor of the outlet is Qadaruddin Shishir, who previously served as the Bangladesh editor of AFP's fact-checking division.

== History ==
According to Daily Waadaa and information published on the organization's official website, Descent is a digital investigative journalism platform. It was established to publish investigative reports examining misinformation, online campaigns, and the facts and context behind various events. In addition to conventional fact-checking, Descent emphasizes analyzing the sources of information, how it spreads, and its potential impact. The organization's editor, Qadaruddin Shishir, previously served as the editor of AFP Fact Check Bangladesh.

== Activities ==
The Dissent's activities include digital investigative journalism, fact-checking, identifying misleading information circulating online, and publishing analyses on contemporary issues. The outlet verifies images, videos, social media posts and various online claims before publishing reports.

In addition to investigative reports and fact-checking, The Dissent also publishes surveys and data-driven analytical reports.

Qadaruddin Shishir has also been quoted by international media outlets, including Al Jazeera, regarding online political campaigns, social media narratives and misinformation-related issues in Bangladesh.

== Notable work ==
- The Dissent has published reports verifying claims, images and videos circulating on social media and analysing online disinformation campaigns. It has also published analyses on misinformation and online campaigns during election periods.
- In the case of the killing of Osman Hadi, The Dissent published an investigation claiming to identify a suspected attacker. The report analysed CCTV footage, publicly available images and social media data. The investigation was later covered by other media outlets.
- In 2025, following an investigative report by The Dissent, Bangladeshi media reported the arrest of a couple in connection with allegations of producing and distributing pornographic content online. The case was also covered by international media, including ThePrint.

== Reception and analysis ==
The Dissent's reports and analyses have been discussed by other media outlets. An opinion article published in Prothom Alo examined the methodology, presentation of information and research structure of one of The Dissent's analytical articles.
