= Bhorer Kagoj =

Bangladeshi newspaper

- Front page of Bhorer Kagoj on 2 February 2009
- Type: Daily newspaper
- Format: Broadsheet
- Owner: Mediascene Ltd
- Publisher: Saber Hossain Chowdhury
- Editor: Shyamal Dutta
- Founded: 15 February 1992
- Political alignment: Liberal
- Language: Bengali
- Headquarters: Karnaphuli Point; 70 New Circular Road; Malibagh, Dhaka; Bangladesh
- Website: bhorerkagoj.com

Bhorer Kagoj (Bengali: দৈনিক ভোরের কাগজ Bhorer Kagoj "Dawn's Paper") is a major Bengali-language daily newspaper, published from Dhaka, Bangladesh. The newspaper is published in both print and online formats.

== History ==
Bhorer Kagoj began publications on 15 February 1992 led by founding editor Nayeemul Islam Khan. Julfikar Ali Manik worked at the paper in the 1990s.

In June 2003, Abed Khan became editor of Bhorer Kagoj replacing Benzir Ahmed. In January 2005, Shyamal Dutta was appointed acting editor of Bhorer Kagoj and full editor in March 2006.

In October 2013, Bangladesh Nationalist Party blasted crude bombs outside the headquarters of Bhorer Kagoj.

Editor Abed Khan and Publisher Saber Hossain Chowdhury were found guilty of contempt in 2014 by the High Court Division. In October 2016, a journalist of the newspaper was assaulted in the main town of Pirganj Upazila, Thakurgaon.

Shampadak Parishad (Editors' Council) condemned threats and legal action against Bhorer Kagoj editor Shyamal Dutta in 2018.

In January 2025, the owners stopped the print edition of Bhorer Kagoj following protests by employees some of whom were linked to the Bangladesh Nationalist Party. After the fall of the Sheikh Hasina led Awami League government and the detention of editor Shyamal Dutta some journalists backed by the Bangladesh Nationalist Party had been trying to establish control over the newspaper. Shyamal Dutta, former secretary general of the National Press Club, has been in jail since September 2024.

== Editors ==
Naimul Islam Khan was the founding editor of the newspaper. Then Matiur Rahman took charge of the newspaper, followed by Benazir Ahmed, Abed Khan, and current editor Shyamal Dutta.

== See also ==
- List of newspapers in Bangladesh
- Bengali-language newspapers
