= Spice FM =

- Dhaka; Bangladesh
- Frequency: 96.4 MHz

Programming
- Languages: Bangla, English
- Format: Music Radio

Ownership
- Owner: City Group
- Sister stations: Ekhon TV

History
- First air date: 1 September 2016

Links
- Website: spicefmbd.com

96.4 Spice FM is the official radio station of Radio Masala Limited in Dhaka. It is privately run by Radio Masala Limited and is now a sister concern of City Group.

== Radio jockeys ==
Radio jockeys include:

- RJ Tazz
- Rj Raju
- RJ Apon
- Rj Anik
- Rj Srabon
- RJ Aniza
- RJ Sifat
- RJ Mim
- RJ PK
- Rj Rima
- RJ Heaven
- RJ Shafin
- RJ Ony
- Rj Amy
- RJ SHATHI
- RJ SHOAIB
- RJ MOCHA
- RJ NISHITA
- RJ JUTHIKA
- HOST KABBO
- RJ JAJABOR RASEL

== PROGRAM MANAGER ==
- KABBO SHARIAR

== HEAD OF SOUND ==
- JAJABOR RASEL

== Assistant Manager, Transmission & Broadcast ==
- MD TANBIR HOSSAIN

== Programs schedule ==
Spice FM shows include:

=== Regular shows ===
- Jumps Start
- Torker Raat
- The D Show
- Breaking Music Show
- The After hours show

=== Weekly shows ===
- Gangsta time with Tazz
- ANONDO NIBASH
- SHOPNODHORA
- REPORTERS FILE
- ROHOSSHO
- CHUTIR SHOKAL
- CAREER A TO Z
- SPICE GAAN LOUNGE
- Health Talk
- Spice Sunday Night
- Travellers Diary
- Shottanneshi
- Bhoot Night
- Islami Sawal Jawab
