= Daily Kalbela =

Daily newspaper in Bangladesh

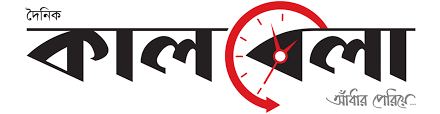
- Type: Online, Print
- Format: Broadsheet
- Publisher: Kalbela Media Ltd
- Editor-in-chief: Santush Sarma
- Language: Bengali
- Country: Bangladesh
- Website: Official Website

Dainik Kalbela is a daily newspaper published from Bangladesh. The newspaper received its first publication permission on 25 January 1991 from the Government of Bangladesh. Santosh Sharma is the publisher of the daily newspaper on behalf of Kalbela Media Limited. The headquarter of the newspaper is located in the Newmarket area of Dhaka. Abed Khan has served as the editor of the newspaper since June 2022. According to a government notification of 2022, the total number of daily Kalbela broadcasts was 1 lakh 41 thousand.

== History ==
Daily Kalbela was allowed to publish by the government in 1991. Journalist Abed Khan joined as editor in 2022. He was forced to resign in November 2023 by the current editor, Santosh Sharma. The newspaper is published in broadsheet form from Dhaka. The magazine can be read online and in print.

== Pages and titles ==
- As many faiths so many paths
- Business hours
- The country
- The need
- World time
- At night
- Yantra Mantra
- The sports
- Last page

== Content, coverage and criticism ==
In September 2024, Rumor Scanner Bangladesh ranked Daily Kalbela as the biggest source of media misinformation according to the fact-checking website's data from the first six months of the year. According to the report, 78 out of the total 681 fact-checked reports were identified as false information. This involved an analysis of reports from 164 media outlets in the country, and Daily Kalbela had been responsible for 20 of the false news reports published across its website, YouTube channel and Facebook page.
