= Abed Khan =

Bangladeshi journalist and columnist

- আবেদ খান
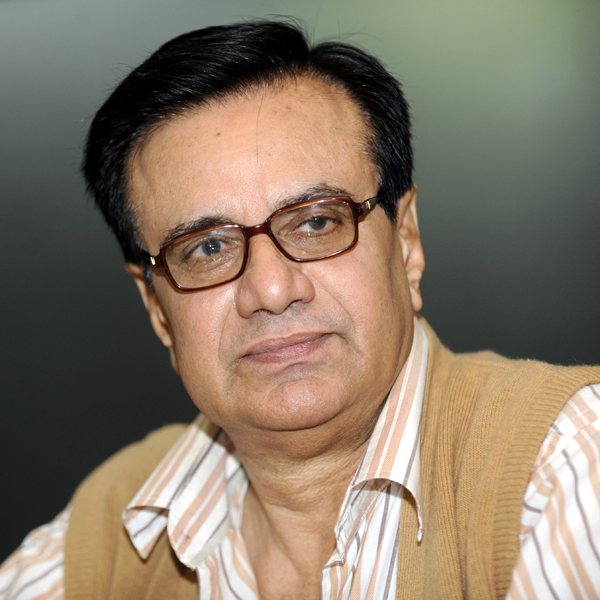
- Abed Khan in 2010
- Born: 16 April 1945 (age 81); Rasulpur, Khulna, Bengal Presidency, British India
- Occupations: Journalist, columnist, author
- Known for: Editing Kaler Kantho, Samakal, Jugantor, Bhorer Kagoj, kalbela
- Spouse: Sanjida Akhter
- Children: 1

Abed Khan (Bengali: আবেদ খান; born 16 April 1945) is a Bangladeshi journalist and columnist. He has been an influential figure in the Bangladeshi news industry in various capacities for five decades. Khan is currently editor and publisher of the Dhaka-based daily Jagaran and is the former chief executive officer and chief editor of ATN News.

== Early life ==
Abed Khan was born in the village of Rasulpur, Khulna district, Bengal Presidency, British India. Both his father and maternal grandfather were renowned journalists in British India. Khan graduated from Dhaka University by 1962, and started working as a sub-editor at daily newspaper Jehad at the age of 17. After almost a year with the Jehad, he joined the daily newspaper Sangbad.

== Career ==
In 1966, Khan took a position at the influential daily newspaper Ittefaq; Khan would later become Ittefaq's chief reporter.

He fought in the Bangladeshi army during the 1971 Bangladesh Liberation War. In 1972, Ittefaq began publishing Khan's "Open Secret", an investigative column dealing with corruption in Bangladesh. Ittefaq also published a series of Khan's columns entitled "Abhajoner Nibedon Iti", written under the pseudonym "Obhajan" (an ordinary man). Khan became Ittefaq's assistant editor in 1978.

In 1995, after 31 years of service at Ittefaq, Abed Khan resigned and became a freelance journalist. He continued to write for several top-ranked Bangladeshi newspapers, includingJagaran, Janakantha, Bhorer Kagoj, Prothom Alo and Sangbad. Janakantha published "Gaurananda Kobi Bhone Shune Punyaban" (Poet Gaurananda describes, that the pious listen to), Khan's highly popular series of satirical articles. Khan briefly served as chief of incipient broadcast network Ekushey Television's news department in 2000. Khan was also elected president of the East Pakistan Journalists' Union and the Dhaka Journalists' Union.

Abed Khan joined the daily Bhorer Kagoj on 18 June 2003 as its editor. He worked there from 2003 until his resignation in 2005, helping Bhorer Kagoj polish its image and recover from financial instability. Khan then acted as editor of the daily Jugantor from 2005 to 2006. He also worked as editor of the daily Samakal.

In January 2010, Abed Khan founded and served as editor of a new daily newspaper, Kaler Kantho, after securing a sponsorship from Bangladeshi business conglomerate Bashundhara Group. Within months, Kaler Kantho's daily circulation had exceeded 200,000 copies. Abed Khan resigned from Kaler Kantho on 30 June 2011, protesting against allegedly unethical articles printed in the daily and citing "the pressure to publish news that went against principle and journalism ethics" as a factor in his resignation.

In late 2011, Abed Khan announced that he would publish and edit a new daily newspaper, Jagoran. After the death of then-chief executive officer of ATN News Mishuk Munier in 2011, Khan served as its chief executive officer and chief editor. He resigned his posts in April 2013, alleging a "poisonous work environment".

After the fall of the Sheikh Hasina-led Awami League government, the Bangladesh Financial Intelligence Unit, along with 32 other journalists, sought information on Khan's bank accounts.
