= Saiful Alam (journalist) =

Bangladeshi journalist

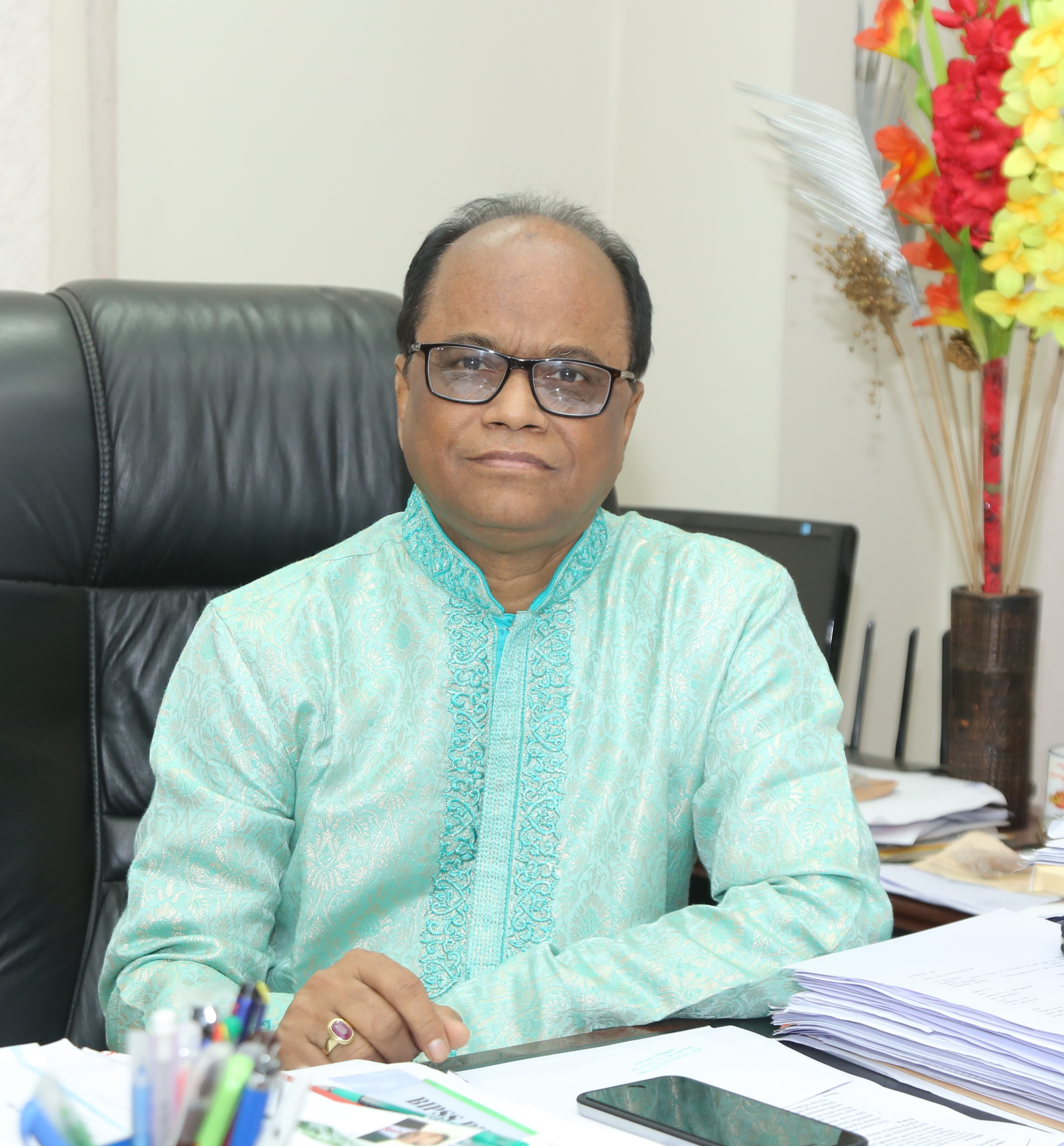

President of the National Press Club
- In office 18 December 2018 – 2020

Editor of the Daily Jugantor
- Incumbent
- Assumed office 19 November 2013

Personal details
- Born: 1 November 1956 (age 69) Dhaka
- Education: University of Dhaka
- Occupation: journalist

Saiful Alam (born 1 November 1956) is a Bangladeshi journalist. He is the former President of Bangladesh National Press Club. He was also the editor of Daily Jugantor.

== Early life ==
Alam was born on 1 November 1956 in Dhaka of the then East Pakistan (now Bangladesh) to Ali Arshad Mia and Shamsun Nahar. He completed his Secondary School Certificate from Motijheel Government Boys' High School and Higher Secondary School Certificate from Dhaka College in 1974. He graduated from the Department of Linguistics of Dhaka University in 1977 and obtained his post graduate degree from the same University in 1978.

From 1972 to 1975, he was an active member of the Bangladesh Students Union. He was also the vice president of Dhaka University Cultural Union.

== Career ==
Alam started his journalism career with the juvenile weekly Kishore Bangla in 1979. In 1983, he joined the Daily Janata as a senior reporter. He worked at the Daily Inqilab as senior reporter from 1986 to 1999. When Jugantor started its publication in February 2000, he joined there at the same post. Subsequently, he was made deputy editor and executive editor. He served as acting editor of the newspaper from 19 November 2013 to 21 February 2020. He was made editor on 22 February 2020.

Alam was a member of the managing committee of Press Institute of Bangladesh (PIB) from 1997 to 1999. From 2016 to 2018, he also served as the director on the Board of Directors of Bangladesh Sangbad Sangstha (BSS). He is one of the members of Bangladesh Editors' Council. He was the Joint Secretary of National Press Club from 1995 to 1998. He served as the senior vice president from 2017 to 2018 before elected its president on 18 December 2018. He is also the founder member of Dhaka Reporter's Unity.

In November 2024, the Interim government of Bangladesh cancelled Alam's press accreditation.

== Publications ==
Alam has written 6 books:

- Cherapata (juvenile story - 1982)
- Nim Fuler Gran (1996)
- Hat Baralei Akash
- Kichu Vabna Kichu Kotha (2013)
- Ganatranta Minus Noy Pluser Proggai
- Ganatranter Jatra O Annayana (2019)

== Personal life ==
Alam is married to Ferdausi Begum, and has two daughters.

== Awards and honors ==
- Abdul Rahman Chishti Memorial Award (2007)
- Padakhep Award (2010)
- Sher-E-Bangla Memorial Honor (2018)
- Altaf Ali Hashu Smriti Padak (2019)
