= Amader Shomoy =

Bangladeshi daily newspaper

- 10 September 2023 cover of Amader Shomoy.
- Type: Daily newspaper
- Format: Broadsheet
- Owner: New Vision Limited
- Publisher: Dr Khondaker Showkat Hossain
- Editor: Md. Shakawath Hossain
- Founded: 2003
- Language: Bengali
- Headquarters: 118-121, Tejgaon I/A, Dhaka-1208, Bangladesh
- Website: dainikamadershomoy.com

Amader Shomoy (Bengali: দৈনিক আমাদের সময়, lit. 'Our Times') is a prominent Bengali-language daily newspaper published from Bangladesh. It was launched in 2003 under the editorial leadership of Nayeemul Islam Khan, who served as the founding editor and publisher. However, he was removed as publisher by a court order in 2012. The paper is known for its extensive national and international coverage, feature pages, and supplements. It is printed in a four-color broadsheet format on brown newsprint paper. The standard edition includes 12 pages with 8 columns per page.

== Regular Sections ==
- News
- More News
- Daily Life & Health (Japit Shomoy o Shastho Protidin)
- Editorial
- International
- Nationwide
- Entertainment Shomoy
- Sports News

== Weekly Feature Pages ==
- Saturday: Samantoral
- Sunday: Artho Shomoy (Economy Time)
- Monday: Bahurekhik
- Tuesday: Projukti Shomoy (Technology Time)
- Wednesday: Ayna Shomoy (Mirror Time)
- Thursday: Ghotangghot
- Friday: Lekhalekhi (Writings)

== Supplements ==
- Shomoyer Dana (সময়ের ডানা): Friday supplement offering a different perspective on current affairs and lifestyle.
- IT Shomoy (আইটি সময়): A daily ICT news corner focused on information and communication technology.

== Former Editors ==
- Nayeemul Islam Khan: 2003 – 2011
- Abu Hasan Shahriar: 2011 – 2014
- Mohammad Golam Sarwar: 2014 – 2023
- Abul Momen: 2023 – 2025
- Abu Syeed Khan: 2025 – 2025

== Social Media ==
Follow Amader Shomoy on social media for the latest updates:

- Facebook: Amader Shomoy
- Facebook: Amader Shomoy Entertainment
- Facebook: Amader Shomoy Sports
- YouTube: Amader Shomoy
- YouTube: Amader Shomoy Entertainment
- Instagram: Amader Shomoy
- Instagram: Amader Shomoy Entertainment
- Twitter/X: Amader Shomoy
- Tiktok: Amader Shomoy
- Website: dainikamadershomoy.com

== See also ==
- List of newspapers in Bangladesh
- Bengali-language newspapers
