= AM Ataul Haque =

Bangladeshi naval officer and freedom fighter

Lt. AM Ataul Haque, also known as AW Chowdhury, was the first Chief of the Bangladesh Navy, serving until 1972, and a veteran of the Bangladesh Liberation War. A former officer of the Royal Indian Navy, he later joined the Pakistan Navy before defecting in 1971 to participate in the war for Bangladesh’s independence. He played a key role in the post-war formation of the Bangladesh Navy.

== Career ==
Haque joined the Royal Indian Navy in 1945. Following the partition of India in 1947, he continued his service in the Pakistan Navy.

After the start of the Bangladesh Liberation War in 1971, Haque renounced his allegiance to the Pakistan Navy and joined Bangladesh’s independence war. His defection was part of a broader wave of Bengali military personnel who sided with the Mukti Bahini. He served in Sector 10, the naval sector, during the war.

Following Bangladesh's victory in December 1971, Haque made significant contributions to the organisation and development of the newly formed Bangladesh Navy. Till April 1972, he was the acting chief of the Bangladesh Navy.

== Personal life ==
Haque was married to Begum Fazilatunnessa. They had seven sons and three daughters. His eldest son, Enamul Haque Md. Al Mamun, disappeared on 10 August 2006. His another son, Zulfikar Ali Manik, is a journalist.

== Death ==
Haque died on 23 February 1977 from cardiac arrest at the Combined Military Hospital, Dhaka.
