= Anis Alamgir =

Bangladeshi journalist, columnist, educator

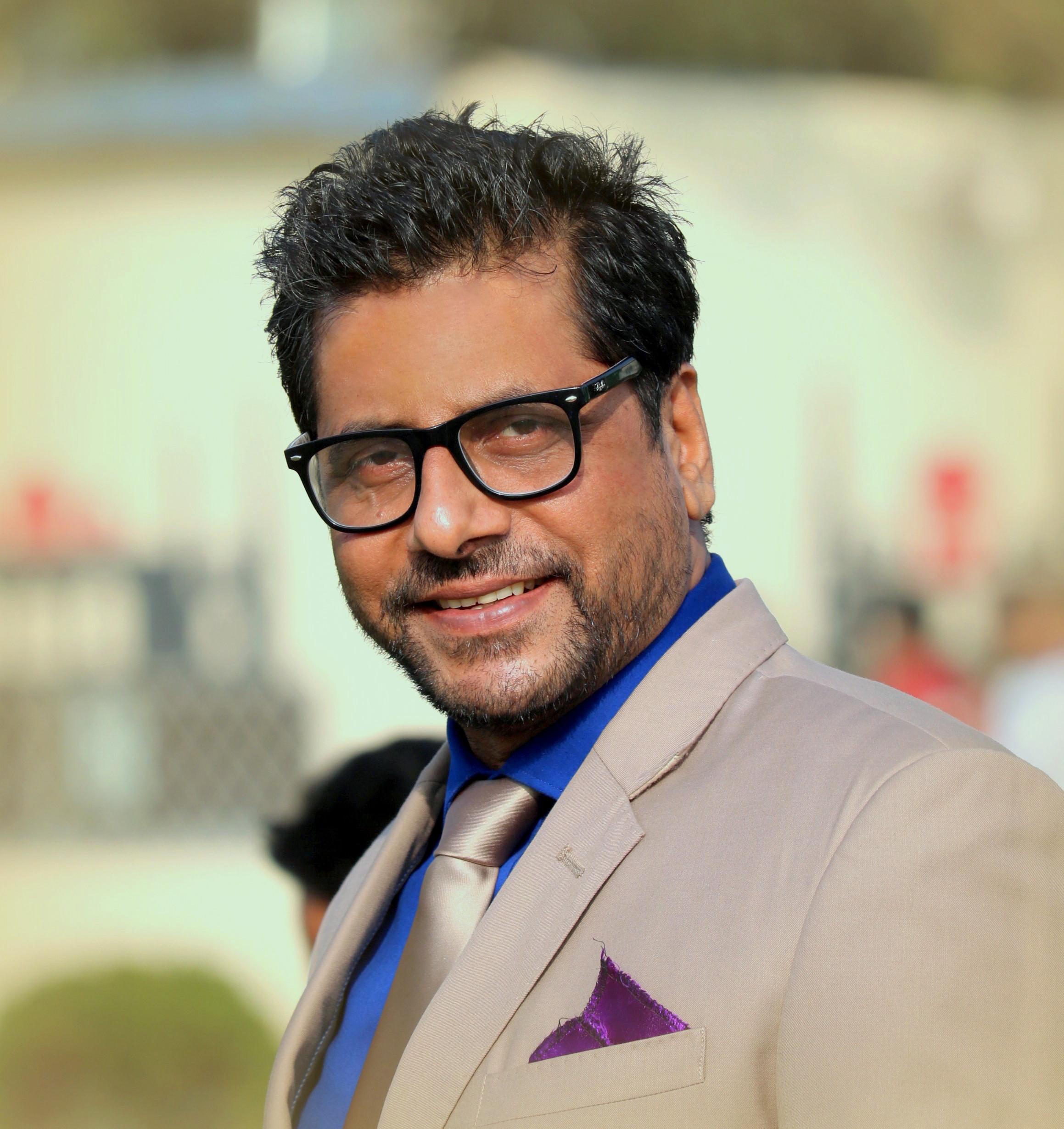
- Anis Alamgir
- Born: Chittagong, Bangladesh
- Education: Dhaka University
- Occupations: Journalist, columnist, educator
- Known for: Reporting from Afghanistan War (2001) and Iraq War (2003)
- Spouse: Shahnaz Chowdhury
- Website: anisalamgir.com

Anis Alamgir (আনিস আলমগীর) is a Bangladeshi journalist, columnist, and educator. He is known for reporting from the battlefields of the Afghanistan War (2001) and the Iraq War (2003). In 2025, Alamgir was arrested under the Anti-terrorism Act and, while in prison, faced a case by the Anti-Corruption Commission before being released on bail in 2026.

== Early life and education ==
Alamgir was born to Hossainuzzaman Bhuiyan and Lailun Nahar Bhuiyan and is from Mirsharai Upazila, Chittagong District. He completed a Master of Arts in Mass Communication and Journalism at the University of Dhaka in 1993.

== Career ==
=== Journalism ===
Alamgir began his journalism career as a staff reporter with Dainik Desh. He later worked as a diplomatic correspondent and later as a special correspondent for Daily Ajker Kagoj. He also worked as a diplomatic correspondent for The Independent. He has served as the staff correspondent of The Morning Sun. He served as editor of Daily Manobkantha. In electronic media, he served as a special correspondent for Channel I. Alamgir has held several senior positions in broadcast journalism. He served as the CEO of Mohona Television for a short time. He also served as head of news at Asian Television, where he also hosted the talk show Table Talk. He held similar roles at RTV and Boishakhi Television.

=== International reporting ===
As a diplomatic correspondent, Alamgir covered a number of major international events, including the Organisation of Islamic Cooperation (OIC) Summit in Iran (1997), the United Nations General Assembly (1999), the United Nations Conference on Trade and Development (UNCTAD) conference in Bangkok (2000), the general elections in Pakistan (2002), OIC Malaysia Summit (2003), and the South Asian Association for Regional Cooperation (SAARC) Summit in Islamabad (2004). He also reported on the Agra Summit between Indian Prime Minister Atal Bihari Vajpayee and Pakistani President Pervez Musharraf, among others.

=== War reporting ===
Alamgir reported on the War in Afghanistan in 2001, during which he was arrested by the Taliban. He later covered the Iraq War in 2003 as a journalist for Daily Ajker Kagoj, reporting from Baghdad.

Following his return from Iraq, Alamgir authored the book Iraq Ronangoney, which was published in 2004 and documents his experiences during the war. He was the only Bangladeshi journalist to report from the battlefields of the Afghanistan War (2001) and the Iraq War (2003).

=== Investigative work ===
Alamgir has produced investigative reports on a range of issues of national and international concern. These include reports on the conditions faced by Bangladeshi pilgrims during the Hajj, the use of Bangladeshi children as camel jockeys in the Middle East, and the situation of undocumented Bangladeshis in Delhi.

=== Notable reporting ===
Alamgir produced a special television report for Boishakhi Television on 15 August 2007, which included archival footage of the killing of Bangabandhu Sheikh Mujibur Rahman and his family members. The footage was broadcast for the first time in over three decades following the 1975 assassination.

=== Academic career ===
Alamgir has been involved in teaching, training, and academic writing. He taught as an adjunct faculty member at the Department of Journalism and Mass Communication at Daffodil International University and at the Department of Television, Film and Photography at the University of Dhaka.

== Legal issues ==
=== 2007 Detention incident ===
On 22 August 2007, Alamgir was briefly detained at a police station following an incident at a checkpoint in Dhanmondi, Dhaka, according to his own account. He reported that he was injured during the encounter and later received medical treatment.

=== Cybercrime case (2018) ===
In January 2018, a case was filed against Alamgir at the Cyber Crime Tribunal in Dhaka under Section 57 of the Information and Communication Technology Act. The case alleged that he had made “offensive and indecent” remarks about the Hindu goddess Saraswati in a Facebook post on 22 January, which reportedly hurt religious sentiments. The complaint was filed by Supreme Court lawyer Sushanta Kumar Basu after police declined to register the case at a local station. The tribunal subsequently took cognizance of the complaint and ordered police to investigate the allegations. Alamgir denied wrongdoing, stating that his post had been intended as praise for the goddess’s beauty. He also said that he had apologized multiple times and removed the post following the controversy.

=== 2025 arrest ===
On 14 December 2025, Alamgir was taken into custody by the Detective Branch of the Dhaka Metropolitan Police from a gym in Dhanmondi for questioning. He was subsequently shown arrested in a case filed under the Anti-Terrorism Act at Uttara West Police Station. The case was filed by an individual identified as a member of the July Revolutionary Alliance, who alleged that Alamgir and others had conspired to destabilise the state and made inciting statements through television appearances and social media. He was produced before a Dhaka court, where police sought a seven-day remand; the court granted a five-day remand for interrogation. Following the completion of remand, he was sent to jail.

The arrest of Alamgir drew criticism from several human rights and press freedom organizations. Amnesty International, Ain o Salish Kendra (ASK), Editors' Council, PEN International Bangladesh and Dhaka Reporters Unity condemned the arrest. The Committee to Protect Journalists (CPJ) additionally called for his unconditional release and to drop the charges against him. While in custody, he was also shown arrested in a case filed by the Anti-Corruption Commission on allegations of acquiring assets beyond known sources of income and money laundering. In response to allegations regarding acquiring assets beyond known sources, Alamgir denied wrongdoing and provided his explanation in an interview with Prothom Alo. He stated that the issue stemmed from the sale of a piece of land, for which taxes had not yet been paid at the time of his arrest, and that the matter had since been presented before a court. He further alleged that the case against him was baseless and intended to damage his reputation. He was released on bail on 14 March 2026.

=== 2026 General Diary ===
In July 2026, a General Diary (GD) was filed at Shahbag Police Station against him, along with five others. The complaint, lodged by a representative of the State Dialogue Forum (SDF), alleged that the accused individuals were involved in running propaganda campaigns against the July Uprising. The accusations against him included allegations of ridiculing the movement on social media and providing support to political activists.

== Books ==
- Iraq Ronangoney (2004)
- Tragedy of Arab Spring (2016)
- Dharma Niye Byabsa (2017)
