= Shyamal Dutta =

Bangladeshi journalist

- শ্যামল দত্ত
- Citizenship: Bangladeshi
- Education: International journalism
- Alma mater: University of California
- Occupations: journalist and newspaper editor
- Years active: 1987 - present

Shyamal Dutta is a Bangladeshi journalist and editor of Bhorer Kagoj. He was the former general secretary of the Jatiya Press Club, the national press club of Bangladesh. He was the vice-chairman of Bangladesh Film Censor Board. He was also a member of the board of governors of the Capital Market Stabilization Fund.

== Early life ==
Dutta did a diploma in international journalism at the University of California. He worked as an intern at the Lincoln Journal Star.

== Career ==
Dutta started his career in journalism in 1987.

Dutta was the general secretary of the Bangladesh Diplomatic Journalist's Association. He had served as the joint secretary of the Commonwealth Journalist's Association. In January 2005, he was appointed acting editor of Bhorer Kagoj and full editor in March 2006.

Dutta has served as a director of Bangladesh Sangbad Sangstha. He is a mentor of WaterAid.

Bangladesh Manobadhikar Sangbadik Forum, Commonwealth Journalists Association, and the International Federation of Journalists called on the government of Bangladesh to protect Dutta after he received threats following Bhorer Kagoj publishing a critical report on book of the Bangladesh Madrassah Education Board in January 2018. Editor's Council condemned an arrest warrant issued against Dutta in a defamation case regarding a news report published about Fazle Hossain Badshah, general secretary of Workers Party of Bangladesh.

Dutta was elected general secretary of the Jatiya Press Club on 31 December 2022. In January 2023, he sat on an appeal board of the Bangladesh Film Censor Board that cleared Shonibar Bikel for release. He received 496 votes while his rival Ilias Khan received 474 votes. He is the vice-president of Commonwealth Journalist's Association. Dhaka Reporters Unity condemned a defamation case filed against him by Arfanul Haque Rifat, Awami League politician and mayor of Comilla. In October 2023, he condemned attacks on journalist during protest programs of Bangladesh Nationalist Party and Bangladesh Jamaat e Islami. He was critical of Bangladesh Bank banning journalist and questioned why one person was allowed to own so many banks.

Dutta accused Vice President Hasan Hafiz and Joint General Secretary Aiyub Bhuiyan of illegally grabbing the control of the National Press Club by removing him and the president Farida Yasmin from office. Students Against Discrimination movement had called for his removal. He was prevented from travelling to India on 6 August 2024 after the resignation of Prime Minister Sheikh Hasina.

== Controversy ==
Shyamal Dutta has been accused by the International Crimes Tribunal investigation agency of inciting murder, genocide, and torture during the 2024 Bangladesh Quota Reform Movement. In addition, a case was filed against him in connection with the murder of Mohammad Fazlu, which occurred in Dhaka's Bhashantek area during the Anti-Discrimination Student Movement.

On March 6, 2025, Shyamal Dutta was detained near the Dhobaura border in Mymensingh while allegedly attempting to cross into India. On September 23, 2025, a Dhaka court rejected his bail application and ordered him to be sent to jail. Prior to the rejection of his bail, Dutta had been placed on a seven-day remand for interrogation related to the murder case.

The arrest of Shyamal Dutta has drawn concern from several international journalist organizations. The Committee to Protect Journalists (CPJ), Reporters Without Borders (RSF), and the Editors' Council expressed concerns over press freedom and called for a fair trial.
