= Ahmed Jobaer =

Bangladeshi journalist

- আহমেদ জোবায়ের
- Education: Dhaka University
- Occupation: Journalist

Ahmed Jobaer (Bengali: আহমেদ জোবায়ের) is a Bangladeshi journalist who previously served as the Managing Director and CEO of Somoy Media Limited, the parent company of Somoy TV. He was sacked after the fall of the Sheikh Hasina-led Awami League government as part of leadership changes in the media in Bangladesh.

== Early life ==
Jobaer studied Mass Communication and Journalism at the University of Dhaka.

== Career ==
Jobaer was a member of the Association of Television Channel Owners and the Federation of Bangladesh Chambers of Commerce & Industries. Jobaer, as Managing Director of Somoy TV, served as the moderator of the talk show Sompadokio, which aired discussions on the prosecution of war crimes following the verdict against Mir Quasem Ali. The programme drew scrutiny from the Supreme Court of Bangladesh, which requested footage, audio, and transcript to examine whether the remarks constituted contempt of court.

Jobaer was sued under the Digital Security Act, 2018, in connection with a report aired by the channel alleging corruption by a Noakhali District Judge's Court official. The case, filed by Mohammad Alamgir, also named two other Somoy TV journalists, has drawn criticism from rights groups over the law’s use against journalists.

After the fall of the Sheikh Hasina led Awami League government in August 2024, Jobaer was removed from his position following internal disputes. Shampa Rahman was subsequently appointed as his replacement. He filed a writ in the High Court on 14 August 2024, challenging the validity of his removal. Following legal proceedings, the High Court ordered a seven-day suspension of Somoy TV’s broadcast. In response, Jobaer submitted a petition to the Appellate Division of the Supreme Court seeking a stay on the High Court’s order. On 25 August 2024, the Supreme Court’s Chamber Judge upheld the suspension order, extending it until further notice.

In August 2024, Jobaer was named in a murder case alongside former Prime Minister Sheikh Hasina and 191 others, including seven journalists. Nearly 200 thousand people were accused in nearly 300 cases targeting Awami League politicians and supporters in August. The case was related to the death of a student, Nayeem Howlader, during protests in Dhaka's Jatrabari area on 19 July 2024. Including journalists in the case led to concerns from international media organisations regarding press freedom. Dhaka Union of Journalists has expressed concerns while Public Prosecutor Omar Faruq Faruqi defended it, saying, "They might not be directly involved, but they aided and abetted through their speeches.".
