= Deshbandhu Group =

Bangladeshi multinational conglomerates

- Formation: 1932
- Headquarters: Dhaka, Bangladesh
- Region served: Bangladesh
- Official language: Bengali
- Revenue: Tk 2,400 crore ▲US$290 million (2020)
- Website: www.dbg.com.bd

Deshbandhu Group (Bengali: দেশবন্ধু গ্রুপ) is a Bangladeshi diversified conglomerate based in Dhaka. Golam Mostafa is the Chairperson and Golam Rahman is the Managing Director of Deshbandhu Group. It headquarters in Mostafa Centre, Banani, is located inside a residential neighborhood.

== History ==
Deshbandhu Sugar Mills Limited was established in 1932. In the early 1960s, it was the smallest of East Pakistan's eight sugar mills, with a rated production capacity of 2,500 tons annually, and was uneconomic.

In 2011, Deshbandhu sought approval from the government of Bangladesh to establish a sugar mill in Thailand or Brazil but was denied permission from Bangladesh Bank.

Sahera Auto Rice Mills Limited started operations on 15 March 2012.

Deshbandhu Group entered in a partnership with Chemtex to build a US$100 million polyester factory in Sirajganj District on 13 September 2015.

The Group invested US$53 million to establish garments factory under Deshbandhu Textile Mills, in Uttara Export Processing Zone in Nilphamari District. The factory was inaugurated by Tipu Munshi, Minister of Commerce, on 5 August 2019. The government of Bangladesh provided approval to City Group and Deshbandhu Group to export sugar on 4 October 2017.

Deshbandhu Group announced plans to invest US$200 million to develop a joint venture Jiangsu Sanfangxiang Group Co., Ltd to petrochemical and chemical fibre production at Mirsarai Economic Zone in Chittagong on 30 October 2018.

On 31 March 2021, Deshbandhu Group started operations of GM Apparels and Southeast Sweaters. Deshbandhu announced plans to raise US$250 million through issuing Sukuk bond and pay off the loans of the group.

== Businesses ==
- Deshbandhu Sugar Mills Limited
- Deshbandhu Food & Beverage Limited
- Deshbandhu Consumer and Agro Products Limited
- Sahera Auto Rice Mills Limited
- Deshbandhu Oil Refinery Limited
- Deshbandhu Polymer Limited
- Deshbandhu Packaging Limited
- Deshbandhu Textile Mills Limited
- Southeast Sweaters Limited
- GM Apparels Limited
- Deshbandhu Cement Mills
- GM Holdings Limited
- Rapa Plaza
- Deshbandhu Parcel and Logistics Limited
- Deshbandhu Shipping Limited
- Deshbandhu Media Limited (Weekly Dudkumar, The Daily Haq Kotha, The Daily Ajkaler Khabar Limited)
- Deshbandhu Power Plant Limited
- TMS Sahera-Wasek Hospital
- Fertilizer Marketing Corporation (FMC)
- M.R. Trading
- Moru Trading Limited
- Commodities Trading Company (CTC)
