= Daily Manobkantha =

Bangladesh newspaper

- Type: Newspaper and Online
- Language: Bangla
- Website: www.manobkantha.com.bd

Daily Manobkantha is a Bangla newspaper of Bangladesh. The newspaper is published in Dhaka. In 2024, its circulation was 171,150. The newspaper was founded in 2012, and is owned by Ashiyan Group.
