= Nasima Khan Monty =

Bangladeshi journalist and writer (born 1977)

- Born: 21 February 1977 (age 49)
- Citizenship: Bangladeshi
- Education: Bachelor (Honors); Master's degree
- Alma mater: University of Dhaka; University of Chittagong
- Occupation: Journalism
- Years active: 1998–present
- Employer: Editor-in-Chief
- Organization: Amader Arthaniti
- Spouse: Nayeemul Islam Khan
- Awards: Bangladesh Online Media Association Award (2017)

Nasima Khan Monty (born 21 February 1977) is a Bangladeshi journalist and writer. She is the editor of the national Daily Amader Arthaniti. For her special contributions to journalism and online media, she was honored by the Bangladesh Online Media Association on 7 October 2017, where Bangladesh's Home Minister Asaduzzaman Khan Kamal presented the award.

== Early life ==
Monty completed her bachelor's degree in Public Administration from the University of Chittagong and later earned a master's degree in Gender Studies from the University of Dhaka. She has been involved in journalism since her student life and has held various positions in print and electronic media.

== Career ==
While studying at the University of Chittagong in 1997, Monty began her journalism career as a university correspondent for the daily newspaper Ajker Kagoj (1997–1998). Alongside practical experience, she pursued higher degrees in film and media studies. She is also associated with the research and training institute Bangladesh Center for Development Journalism and Communication (BCDJC).

Monty later worked in the news division of Bangladesh's private television channel ATN News for several years. After leaving ATN News, she became the editor of AmaderShomoy.com. She is the editor-in-chief of the English daily The Our Time and the Bengali daily Amader Notun Shomoy. She has also worked with Center for Policy Dialogue (CPD).

Monty signed a letter in September 2023 condemning an open letter by 171 global leaders calling for halting legal proceedings against Muhmmad Yunus, founder of Grameen Bank.

Following the fall of the Sheikh Hasina led Awami League government, the interim government led by Muhammad Yunus imposed a travel ban on her, her husband, and their three daughters. Bangladesh Financial Intelligence Unit investigated their bank accounts. Senior Special Judge Zakir Hossain Galib of Dhaka Metropolitan imposed a travel ban on her and her family following a petition of the Anti-Corruption Commission.

== Personal life ==
Monty is married to Nayeemul Islam Khan, press secretary to former Prime Minister Sheikh Hasina.
