= Nayeemul Islam Khan =

Bangladeshi journalist

- নাঈমুল ইসলাম খান
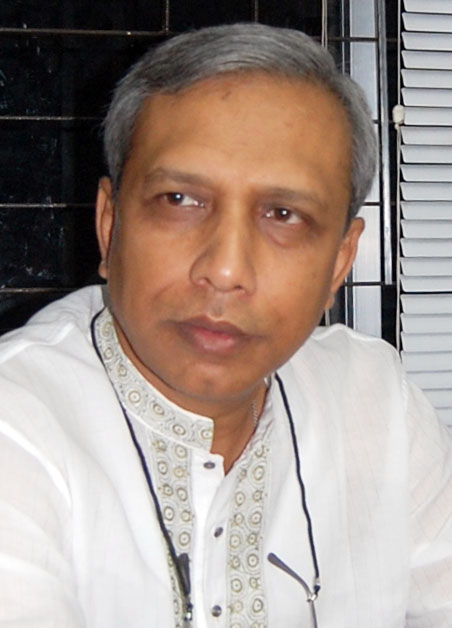
- Khan in 2009

Prime Minister's Press Secretary
- In office 6 June 2024 – 5 August 2024
- Prime Minister: Sheikh Hasina
- Preceded by: Ihsanul Karim
- Succeeded by: Shafiqul Alam

Personal details
- Born: 21 January 1960
- Spouse: Taslima Nasrin (m. 1990; div. 1991) Nasima Khan Monty
- Parent(s): Nurul Islam Khan (father); Nurun Nahar Khan (mother)
- Education: University of Dhaka
- Alma mater: Comilla Zilla School
- Occupation: Newspaper editor and journalist

Nayeemul Islam Khan (Bengali: নাঈমুল ইসলাম খান born 1960) is a Bangladeshi journalist who has been active in the field since 1982. He served as the press secretary to Prime Minister Sheikh Hasina. Khan has also worked as the editor of several newspapers, including the Bengali dailies Amader Notun Shomoy and Amader Orthoneeti, as well as the English daily The Our Time.

He is known for his introduction of 'modern approach' of Bengali daily newspapers with the illustrated daily, Ajker Kagoj, launched in 1990. Shortly after, he published the newspaper Daily Bhorer Kagoj.

He is the founding editor of the daily Amader Shomoy newspaper in 2003.

== Career ==
Nayeemul Islam Khan's debut as an editor was for the short-lived monthly magazine Shomoy that was published for a few months in 1982. His next project was editing Khoborer Kagoj, which made its debut as a weekly in 1987. He is acclaimed as the father of modern approach to the Bengali-language newspaper for his work at Ajker Kahoj, in which he served as editor from its founding 1990 until 1992. That newspaper later closed in 2007. In 1992, he also founded another Bengali-language daily Bhorer Kagoj, which was later edited by Matiur Rahman. Both Ajker Kahoj and Bhorer Kagoj were non-traditional in style and tone. He quit the Bhorer Kagoj in 1992 to run the non-governmental organisation Bangladesh Centre for Development, Journalism and Communication. He made an abortive attempt to publish another daily under the title Notundhara. He also started his own daily, Amader Shomoy in 2007 but was removed as publisher by a court order in 2012. It was a four-page daily that cost TK 2.

In 2013, Khan and his wife were returning home from a social event on 11 March when his car, which was clearly marked as a car belonging to the media, was attacked with molotov cocktails, one of which hit the car. He and his wife had to go to the hospital for treatment. The source of the attacks is unknown. The International Federation of Journalists believed he could have been targeted as he had been making frequent television appearances. The Committee to Protect Journalists called for quick investigations and demanded the violence directed against journalists be stopped.

On March 3, 2025, the Bangladesh Financial Intelligence Unit (BFIU) ordered the freezing of the personal and institutional bank accounts of Nayeemul Islam Khan, his wife Nasima Khan Monty, and their children. The directive was issued to all banks and financial institutions in Bangladesh. On the same day, the Anti-Corruption Commission (ACC) obtained a court order to seize the tax files of Khan and his wife.

Khan was named as an accused in a case filed over the death of Sajjad Hossain, a student who was shot during the anti-discrimination movement in Rangpur. The case also named former Prime Minister Sheikh Hasina, her sister Sheikh Rehana, and journalist Subhash Singha Roy, among others. Additionally, another case was filed at Jatrabari Police Station in connection with the death of Nayeem Howlader, a student who was shot during anti-quota protests. The case accused Hasina and seven journalists, including Khan.
