= Capital Market Stabilization Fund =

Special fund of country Bangladesh

- Formation: 2021
- Headquarters: Dhaka, Bangladesh
- Region served: Bangladesh
- Official language: Bengali
- Website: cmsfbd.org

Capital Market Stabilization Fund (CMSF) (Bengali: ক্যাপিটাল মার্কেট স্ট্যাবিলাইজেশন ফান্ড) is a fund established by the Bangladesh Securities and Exchange Commission (BSEC) under the Bangladesh Securities and Exchange Commission (Capital Market Stabilization Fund) Rules, 2021, promulgated pursuant to section 33(1) of the Securities and Exchange Ordinance, 1969.

CMSF acts as the custodian of undistributed cash dividends, stock dividends, non-refunded public subscription money, unallotted rights shares and other unclaimed investor entitlements transferred by issuers of listed securities in accordance with the Rules. Eligible shareholders and investors may claim such assets from the Fund through the prescribed procedures.

== History ==
The concept of the Capital Market Stabilization Fund (CMSF) emerged from the need to manage undistributed or unclaimed dividends, bonus shares, rights shares, and other investor entitlements that had remained uncollected for extended periods. Prior to the establishment of the Fund, such assets remained with listed companies, raising concerns regarding investor protection, transparency, and accountability.

On 1 June 2021, the Bangladesh Securities and Exchange Commission (BSEC) established CMSF under the Bangladesh Securities and Exchange Commission (Capital Market Stabilization Fund) Rules, 2021, promulgated pursuant to section 33(1) of the Securities and Exchange Ordinance, 1969. Under the Rules, listed companies were required to transfer undistributed cash dividends, stock dividends, rights shares, non-refunded public subscription money, and other investor benefits that had remained unclaimed for more than three years to the Fund.

CMSF was established as the custodian of such transferred assets and provides a mechanism through which eligible investors and their legal successors may recover their entitlements through a claims settlement process. The Fund also supports investor education, research, financial literacy, and other capital market development initiatives in Bangladesh.

Md. Nojibur Rahman, former Principal Secretary to the Prime Minister of Bangladesh, was appointed as the inaugural Chairman of CMSF. Md. Monowar Hossain served as the Fund's first Chief of Operations.

== Legal status ==
CMSF was established in 2021 under the Bangladesh Securities and Exchange Commission (Capital Market Stabilization Fund) Rules, 2021, issued by the Bangladesh Securities and Exchange Commission (BSEC) in exercise of powers under section 33(1) of the Securities and Exchange Ordinance, 1969.

A draft Capital Market Stabilization Fund Ordinance, 2026 has been published by the Ministry of Finance for public consultation. The proposed legislation seeks to provide a strengthened statutory framework for CMSF, including provisions relating to governance structure, fund management, and investor protection mechanisms.

== Management status ==
An Operations Management Committee (OMC) has been constituted by the Bangladesh Securities and Exchange Commission (BSEC) to oversee the operational activities of the Capital Market Stabilization Fund (CMSF) until the proposed CMSF Act, 2026 is enacted.

The committee is responsible for supervising operational functions of the Fund and ensuring implementation of regulatory objectives under the CMSF Rules.

As of the latest available information, the Operations Management Committee includes the following members:

- Mr. Kamrul Anam Khan, FCMA – Chief Accountant (Executive Director), BSEC and Chairman, OMC, CMSF
- Mr. Md. Monsur Rahman – Executive Director, BSEC
- Mr. Mohammed Humayun Kabir, FCA – President (2026), South Asian Federation of Accountants (SAFA)
- Mr. Md. Abdul Mutaleb – Managing Director, Central Depository Bangladesh Limited (CDBL)

Md. Wasi Azam serves as the Head of Operations of CMSF.

== Fund size and settlement activity ==
As of 31 December 2025 (unaudited), the Capital Market Stabilization Fund (CMSF) reported receipts from issuer companies comprising cash dividends and other monetary transfers, along with listed securities transferred under the CMSF framework. The Fund also generated earnings from investments and bank interest.

CMSF has also processed investor claims relating to transferred assets, including cash dividends, stock entitlements, and other eligible benefits, under its settlement mechanism. According to available reports, the Fund has settled claims in favour of investors including individuals and institutions.

== Reception ==
The establishment of CMSF has been subject to differing views among market participants. Some concerns have been raised regarding governance structure, administrative procedures, and operational efficiency during its initial years of operation. The Fund has also faced public scrutiny related to its administrative expenditures and meeting-related costs in its early operational period.

Despite these concerns, CMSF continues to operate under the regulatory framework established by the Bangladesh Securities and Exchange Commission and remains responsible for managing unclaimed investor entitlements and facilitating their return to eligible claimants.

== Current status ==
CMSF continues to operate under the Bangladesh Securities and Exchange Commission (Capital Market Stabilization Fund) Rules, 2021. In 2026, the Government of Bangladesh considered the introduction of a dedicated legal framework for the Fund through a proposed CMSF Ordinance or Act.

An Operations Management Committee (OMC) was constituted by BSEC to oversee the operational activities of the Fund pending the enactment of the proposed legislation.

As of 31 December 2025, CMSF reported assets comprising cash, listed securities, and investment earnings received from issuer companies. The Fund had also settled claims in favour of shareholders, investors, and other beneficiaries through its claims settlement mechanism.
