= Daily Waadaa =

English-language online news outlet in Bangladesh

- Type: News outlet
- Format: Web portal
- Owner: MGH Media Limited
- Editor: Shafiqul Alam
- Founded: 2026
- Language: English
- Headquarters: Autograph Tower (9th Floor), 67 & 68 Kamal Ataturk Avenue, Banani, Dhaka 1213, Bangladesh
- Website: www.dailywaadaa.com

Daily Waadaa is an English-language online news outlet in Bangladesh that began publishing in 2026. Owned by MGH Media Limited and based in Dhaka, it has Shafiqul Alam as its editor.

Following its launch, several international news outlets cited reporting by The Daily Waadaa in their coverage of defence relations between Bangladesh and China.

== History ==
In February 2026, several news outlets reported that Shafiqul Alam had joined the publication as editor, while Azad Majumder had been appointed executive editor around the same time.

Shafiqul Alam had previously served as the Dhaka bureau chief of the international news agency Agence France-Presse (AFP) and was appointed press secretary to the chief adviser of the Interim government of Muhammad Yunus in 2024. Both journalists took up founding editorial positions at the publication after completing their duties in the government's press wing.

The publication began operating in 2026, initially on a limited scale.

In June 2026, Asian News International (ANI), Firstpost and The Times of India published reports citing The Daily Waadaa's coverage of Bangladesh–China defence relations, stating that Bangladesh was planning to purchase Chinese J-10CE fighter jets.

In August 2026, The Daily Waadaa published a report stating that a decision had been finalised to nominate Mirza Fakhrul Islam Alamgir as the next president of Bangladesh. The following day, Channel i Online cited The Daily Waadaa's report as a source in its own coverage.
