= Julfikar Ali Manik =

- Occupation: Bangladeshi journalist
- Years active: 1990–present
- Known for: reporting on Islamic extremism in Bangladesh
- Parents: AM Ataul Haque (father); Begum Fazilatunnessa (mother)
- Relatives: 6 brothers, 3 sisters

Julfikar Ali Manik is a Bangladeshi journalist and writer known for his reporting on Islamic extremism in Bangladesh. He has written for The Daily Star, Dhaka Tribune, The New York Times, Mint, The Seatle Times, The Orange County Register, South Asia Citizens Wire, and The Business Standard.

== Early life ==
Manik's parents were AM Ataul Haque, the first Chief of the Bangladesh Navy, and his mother was Begum Fazilatunnessa. He has six brothers and three sisters. His elder brother, Enamul Haque Md. Al Mamun, disappeared on 10 August 2006.

== Career ==
Manik started working as a journalist in 1990.

Manik received awards from the Bangladesh Press Institute and Transparency International Bangladesh in 2001.

In 2004, Manik started working as a stringer for The New York Times. From 2004 to 2013, he worked at The Daily Star. Manik became a Dart Asia Fellow in 2013. He was critical of Section 57 of the Information and Communication Technology Act, 2006, being used to target journalists and leading to self-censorship. He was awarded the Gerald Loeb Award for his reporting on the Rana Plaza collapse.

Manik was a planning consultant for Boishakhi TV. He supported hiring Tashnuva Anan Shishir as the first transgender anchor in Bangladesh at Boishakhi TV.

After the fall of the Sheikh Hasina led Awami League government, about 1000 journalists were targeted after being "deemed too secular". Manik has also been targeted for his reporting against Islamic extremism and terrorism. Bangladesh Financial Intelligence Unit sought information on his bank accounts along with 26 other journalists and media professionals.

== See also ==
- Persecution of Journalists under Bangladesh's Interim Government (2024–25)
