= University Teachers' Network, Bangladesh =

The University Teachers' Network of Bangladesh
- The University Teachers' Network of Bangladesh
- বিশ্ববিদ্যালয় শিক্ষক নেটওয়ার্ক
- Founded: March 2014
- Location: Bangladesh

The University Teachers' Network of Bangladesh (UTN) is a coalition of Bangladeshi academics established in March 2014. It includes educators from public and private universities in Bangladesh as well as those based abroad.

== History ==
The UTN emerged in 2014 amid protests at Rajshahi University over the commercialization of evening courses. Initially focused on academic freedom and higher education policy, the network evolved into a significant actor in civic and constitutional reform. UTN used digital platforms like Facebook and WhatsApp to coordinate, circulate reform proposals, and organize actions such as lectures, human chains, and protests.

== Role in 2024 Uprising ==
During the 2024 mass uprising in Bangladesh, UTN played a prominent role. It organized the "Anti-Repression Teachers' Rally" on 29 July 2024 at Dhaka University, demanding the release of detained students and recognition of the killings as a "massacre".

On 4 August 2024, UTN announced a five-point proposal for forming an inclusive interim government, comprising teachers, judges, civil society representatives, and student-nominated members.

On 10 August 2024, it followed up with an 11-point charter for democratic transformation, advocating free media, minority rights, cyber freedom, and electoral reforms.

== Later Activities ==
On 6 August 2024, the UTN denounced government inaction in protecting minorities and called for military neutrality.

In September 2024, UTN defended textbook authors against "hate tag" campaigns and rejected attempts to politicize educational content.

In January 2025, UTN demanded the reopening of Dhaka University’s full campus, advocated for participatory governance, and pushed for timely student elections.

On 3 August 2025, the Network held a seminar titled "What Kind of Universities Do We Have in Post-Uprising Bangladesh?", where speakers warned that authoritarianism and bureaucratic dominance persist in higher education.

On 6 August 2025, UTN condemned an exhibition by Islami Chhatra Shibir at Dhaka University glorifying war criminals, calling it a desecration of the university’s historical role in the liberation war.
