= City Group =

Bangladeshi conglomerate

- Type: Private
- Industry: Conglomerate
- Founded: 6 February 1972 (as City Oil Mills)
- Founder: Fazlur Rahman
- Headquarters: City House, House # NW(J) 06, Road # 51, Gulshan-2, Dhaka- 1212, Bangladesh
- Key people: Hamida Rahman (chairperson); Md. Hasan (managing director)
- Products: Consumer goods, foods, steel, printing & packaging, shipping, power & energy
- Brands: TEER, BENGAL, Sun, Natural, Jibon, Quick Bite
- Services: Stocks & securities, insurance, media, healthcare
- Revenue: Tk. 32,000 crore (US$2.6 billion) (2025)
- Owner: Fazlur Rahman family
- Website: https://citygroup.com.bd/

City Group (Bengali: সিটি গ্রুপ, stylised as citygroup) is a Bangladeshi conglomerate. It began on 6 February 1972 as a mustard oil company venture under the name City Oil Mills. It presently owns more than 25 major concerns located throughout Bangladesh.

== History ==
City Group was established by Fazlur Rahman, a business magnate in the private sector of Bangladesh. City Group began on 6 February 1972 as a mustard oil company venture. After its first project, City Group invested in new fields, including manufacturing, industry and trading. More enterprises were established in the early 1990s; these included consumer goods, foods, steel, printing & packaging, shipping, power and energy, shares and securities, insurance, media, and healthcare.

On 4 October 2017, the government of Bangladesh approved the export of 57,273 tones of sugar by Deshbandhu Group and City Group.

== City Hi-Tech Park ==
City Group plans to build a Hi-Tech Park in Demra, Dhaka which would be the biggest hi-tech park developed by a private company. The park is intended to be used to manufacture technology products such as microprocessors, chips, circuits, mobile phones and laptops.

== Controversy ==
On 14 July 2022, A Chittagong court issued an arrest warrant for City Group Chairman Fazlur Rahman, in a case filed by the Bangladesh Standards and Testing Institution (BSTI) for not maintaining standard Vitamin A levels in soybean and palm oils.

Prior to that, on 20 October 2019, BSTI inspector Rajiv Dasgupta filed a case as the group's "Teer" oil failed to pass the "Vitamin-A" test in BSTI lab. In the case statement, the allegation was brought against Fazlur Rahman saying that he violated the government order and act by not following edibles oil fortification with Vitamin A Act-2013.

== List of companies ==
City Group operates over 25 major concerns:

- Asgar Ali Hospital Ltd.
- Ekhon Television (Spice Television Limited).
- C.S.I Power & Energy Ltd.
- Chandpur Belgaon Tea estate, Banskhali, Chittagram.
- City Bran Oil Ltd.
- City Dal Mills Ltd.
- City Edible Oil Ltd
- City Feed Products Ltd.
- City Fibers Ltd.
- City Navigations Ltd.
- City Oil Mills
- City PET Industries Ltd.
- City Re-rolling Mills
- City Salt Industries Ltd.
- City Seed Crushing Industries Ltd.
- City Sugar Industries Ltd.
- City Vegetable Oil Mills Ltd.
- Deepa Food Products Ltd.
- Dhaka Insurance Ltd.
- Farzana Oil Refineries Ltd.
- Hamida Plastic Industries Ltd.
- Hasan Containers Ltd.
- Hasan Flour Mills Ltd.
- Hasan Plastic Industries Ltd.
- Hasan Printing & Packaging Ltd.
- Hasan Securities Ltd.
- Nahar Tea Estate, Sreemongal, Moulovibazar.
- New Sagurnal Tea Co. Ltd. Juri, Moulovibazar.
- Radio Masala Limited (96.4 Spice FM)
- Rahman Synthetics Ltd.
- Rupshi Flour Mills Ltd.
- Rupshi Foods Ltd.
- Shampa Flour Mills Ltd.
- Shampa Oil Mills Ltd.
- Somoy Media Ltd (Somoy TV).
- Speech Bubble Communications Ltd.
- VOTT Oil Refineries Ltd.

== See also ==
- List of companies of Bangladesh
