= Somoy TV =

Bangladeshi television channel

Somoy TV সময় টিভি
- Country: Bangladesh
- Broadcast area: Nationwide
- Headquarters: Bir Uttam CR Dutta Road, Dhaka

Programming
- Language: Bengali
- Picture format: 1080i HDTV (downscaled to 16:9 576i for SDTV sets)

Ownership
- Owner: City Group

History
- Launched: 17 April 2011; 15 years ago

Links
- Website: www.somoynews.tv

YouTube information
- Channel: SOMOY TV
- Years active: 2015–present
- Genre: News (in Bengali)
- Subscribers: 27 million
- Views: 16.1 billion
- Last updated: 24 June 2024

Somoy TV (Bengali: সময় টিভি, lit. 'Time TV'), also known as just Somoy (Bengali: সময়; Bengali pronunciation: [ˈʃɔmɔe̯]) as branded on-air, is a Bangladeshi Bengali-language satellite and cable news television channel. It is based in the Nasir Trade Centre at Bir Uttam CR Dutta Road in Dhaka. Somoy is primarily owned by City Group.

The channel was launched on 17 April 2011. It broadcasts using the Bangladesh-1 satellite since 2019. The official YouTube channel of Somoy TV is one of the most subscribed channels from Bangladesh, being the first to receive the Diamond Play Button in 2021. Several fact-checking organizations have identified Somoy TV as a significant source of misinformation within Bangladesh.

== History ==
Somoy TV received government permission to broadcast in October 2009. It started test transmission on 10 October 2010 and has been commercially on-air since 17 April 2011. Before its official launch, Somoy TV was sold to City Group on 8 June 2010. In November 2011, Somoy TV, along with three other Bangladeshi television channels, signed an agreement with UNICEF to air children's programming for one minute. My TV was available for streaming on phones through Teletalk's 3G services in October 2012.

On 19 May 2019, Somoy TV, along with five other channels, began broadcasting via the Bangladesh-1 satellite after signing an agreement with BSCL. The official YouTube channel of Somoy TV was hacked by unknown hackers on 16 October 2022, subsequently being renamed 'Ethereum 2.0', after the Ethereum cryptocurrency. The channel was reverted to its original form ten minutes after the hacking incident, but its name was not reverted until later.

On 10 August 2024, it was reported that the managing director and chief executive of Somoy, Ahmed Jobaer, was relieved from his position and replaced by Shampa Rahman as the former. This decision was taken after a meeting of Somoy's Board of Directors. Jobaer later clarified that the license of Somoy was in his name and, according to regulations, he must be in charge of the main operations. He also stated that he would go to court to challenge the decision. Somoy later denied sacking Jobaer, calling the board meeting "illegal" on its web portal.

Ahead of the event, Somoy TV became the official Bangladeshi broadcaster of the 2026 FIFA World Cup along with Bangladesh Television and T Sports.

=== Broadcast suspensions ===
On 5 August 2024, Somoy abruptly ceased transmissions temporarily shortly after the resignation of Sheikh Hasina after being attacked and vandalized by mobs. The channel later went back on the air.

Justices Naima Haider Sashanka Shekhar Sarkar of the High Court Division ordered Somoy to suspend broadcasts for a week following a writ petition filed by Shampa Rahman, the managing director of the television channel. Somoy went off the air on television at 23:59 (BST) on 19 August 2024, although it continued its operations online. According to the petitioner's lawyer, Ahsanul Karim, Somoy TV was used as a mouthpiece of the previous AL–led government. Ahmed Jobaer subsequently filed an application with the company bench of the High Court which challenged the validity of his removal. He also filed an appeal in the chamber court of the appellate division to resume the television broadcasts of Somoy.

The hearing of the writ petition occurred on 25 August 2024, with the order on Somoy's broadcast suspension originally being scheduled for 27 August, but was later postponed until 1 September. Meanwhile, Somoy resumed television broadcasts under new management on 26 August at 23:59 (BST).

It was one of the Bangladeshi channels whose YouTube channels were geo-blocked in India on 9 May 2025, citing threat to national security concerns during the 2025 India–Pakistan conflict.

== Controversies ==
On 1 January 2014, unidentified individuals threw bombs at a vehicle owned by Somoy, injuring the driver, in Chittagong. Journalists at the network accused Bangladesh Jamaat-e-Islami and Islami Chhatra Shibir activists of the attack.

On 1 April 2015, the Bangladesh Police seized the broadcast equipment of Somoy outside the Gulshan office of the former prime minister and chairperson of Bangladesh Nationalist Party, Khaleda Zia. The officer-in-charge of the Gulshan police station, Rafiqul Islam, stated that the device was being examined to ensure no sensitive content was contained.

In May 2016, drug dealers assaulted Somoy's Cox's Bazar correspondent, Sujauddin Rubel, for his reports on drug trafficking. Four other journalists were assaulted as well. In August 2016, the Attorney General of Bangladesh, Mahbubey Alam, filed a complaint with the Bangladesh Supreme Court over remarks on a talk show broadcast on the channel that discussed the trial of the executed war crimes convict Mir Quasem Ali. Somoy TV was later asked to submit transcripts of the show to the court on 31 August, which they did on 5 September.

On 30 November 2017, a group of men from the Jubo League, led by the son of the former Minister of Land Shamsur Rahman Sherif, allegedly beat four journalists, including a correspondent of Somoy, in Rooppur, Ishwardi, where they went to report on Prime Minister Sheikh Hasina's visit to the upazila in preparations of the inauguration of constructions of the Rooppur Nuclear Power Plant. Three were arrested by police afterward.

In August 2023, Bangladesh Nationalist Party boycotted Somoy's talk shows, alleging 'bias'.

During the 2024 quota reform protests, Md. Shariatullah, a video journalist was suspended due to unprofessional behavior while covering the student protests clash. He was seen requesting policemen to shoot at the protesters while on duty at Jatrabari in the capital, which later garnered criticism on the internet.

== See also ==
- List of television stations in Bangladesh
