= Bangladesh Federal Union of Journalists =

Trade union

BFUJ
- Bangladesh Federal Union of Journalists
- বাংলাদেশ ফেডারেল সাংবাদিক ইউনিয়ন
- Founded: 1971
- Headquarters: 18 Artillery Road; Dhaka-1000
- Location: Bangladesh
- Members: 3786
- Key people: Manjurul Ahsan Bulbul, President
- Affiliations: Bangladesh Awami League
- Website: bfujonline.com

The Bangladesh Federal Union of Journalists (Bengali: বাংলাদেশ ফেডারেল সাংবাদিক ইউনিয়ন, romanized: Bānlādēśa phēḍārēla sāmbādika i'uniẏana) is a national trade union of professional journalists in Bangladesh and is located in Dhaka, Bangladesh. It is aligned with the political party Bangladesh Awami League.

== History ==
The Bangladesh Federal Union of Journalists was founded in 1950 as the Pakistan Federal Union of Journalists. After the independence of Bangladesh in 1971, the name was changed to Bangladesh Federal Union of Journalists. As of 2016, the union had 3786 members throughout Bangladesh. In the same year, Manjurul Ahsan Bulbul was elected as its president through a by-election.

In 2017, along with the Dhaka Union of Journalists, BFUJ called for the repeal of section 57 of the Information and Communication Technology Act of Bangladesh, which it said was being used to censor journalists.
