= Robaet Ferdous =

Robaet Ferdous is a professor of Mass Media and Journalism at the University of Dhaka. He is an indigenous people's right activist. He is a member of the Shushashoner Jonno Nagorik (Shujon). He is a member of the syndicate board of Northern University Bangladesh.

== Career ==
In January 2008, Ferdous demanded release of faculty members of the University of Dhaka detained by the Caretaker government following clashes between Bangladesh Army and students on campus.

Ferdous hosted “Our Democracy” program on RTV. He has been critical of the Army Housing Scheme forcing residents of Rupganj to sell their land at low prices to the scheme. He was a judge of Meena Media Award, 2013.

Ferdous condemned a threat by Hefajat-e Islam Bangladesh to Sultana Kamal in 2017. He as a jury of the Migration Media Award, 2017.

In 2019, Ferdous joined members of the civil society in condemning the cancellation venue permit to Arundhati Roy. He was part of a delegation of the Citizens' Platform (Nagorik Samaj) which visited Moulvibazar in June 2021 to protest eviction of Khasia and Garo communities from their lands. He signed a statement calling for the release of Rozina Islam, a journalist of Prothom Alo. He was a judge of the UNICEF Meena Media Awards-2021.

After the fall of the Sheikh Hasina led Awami League government, Ferdous supported the creation of a new constitution and establishment of strong state institutions to protect democracy.

== Bibliography ==
- Babsaye Sangbadikota (Business Journalism, 2010) coedited with Ajoy Dasgupta.
