= Shafiqul Alam =

Bangladeshi journalist

- শফিকুল আলম
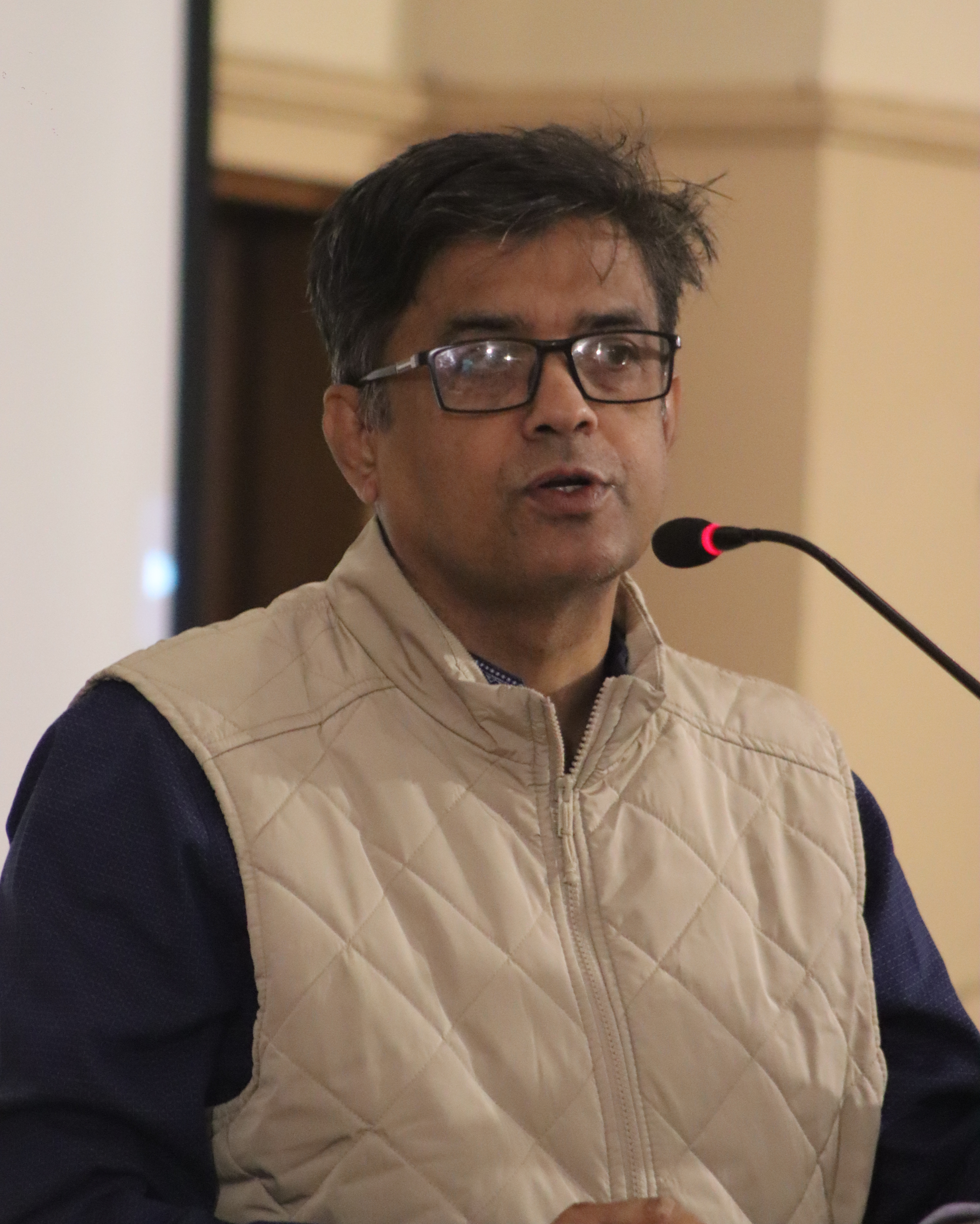
- Alam in 2024

Press Secretary to the Chief Adviser
- In office 13 August 2024 – 17 February 2026
- Chief Adviser: Muhammad Yunus
- Preceded by: Nayeemul Islam Khan
- Succeeded by: Abdullah M. Saleh

Personal details
- Born: Bangladesh
- Education: Notre Dame College, Dhaka; University of Dhaka
- Profession: Journalist

Shafiqul Alam is a Bangladeshi journalist. He was the Press Secretary to the chief adviser of the interim government of Bangladesh, Muhammad Yunus. He was appointed to this position in August 2024.

== Early life and education ==
Shafiqul Alam completed his secondary education at Dhaka's Motijheel Government Boys' High School and his higher secondary education at Notre Dame College. He went on to earn a bachelor's degree from the University of Dhaka.

== Career ==
Shafiqul Alam began his career in the field of sports journalism, where he spent seven and a half years working with The Bangladesh Observer. He then transitioned to business journalism, joining The Financial Express for two and a half years. On January 14, 2005, he joined Agence France-Presse (AFP) as a correspondent. During his two-decade tenure at AFP, he served as a correspondent for the first seven years before being promoted to the position of bureau chief for Bangladesh in 2012, a role he held until his appointment as press secretary.

In January 2025, Shafiqul Alam reported that a group of youths called him a "public enemy" (Ganashatru) while he was passing by. He expressed concerns that growing public resentment might force him to move to a government flat and stated that his family was deeply worried about their safety. On February 3, 2025, he stated that anyone distributing leaflets in support of the Awami League would be arrested, calling the party "fascist" and accusing its supporters of inciting unrest. In June 2025, Alam won the Society of Publishers in Asia (SOPA) Awards 2025.

=== Appointment as press secretary ===
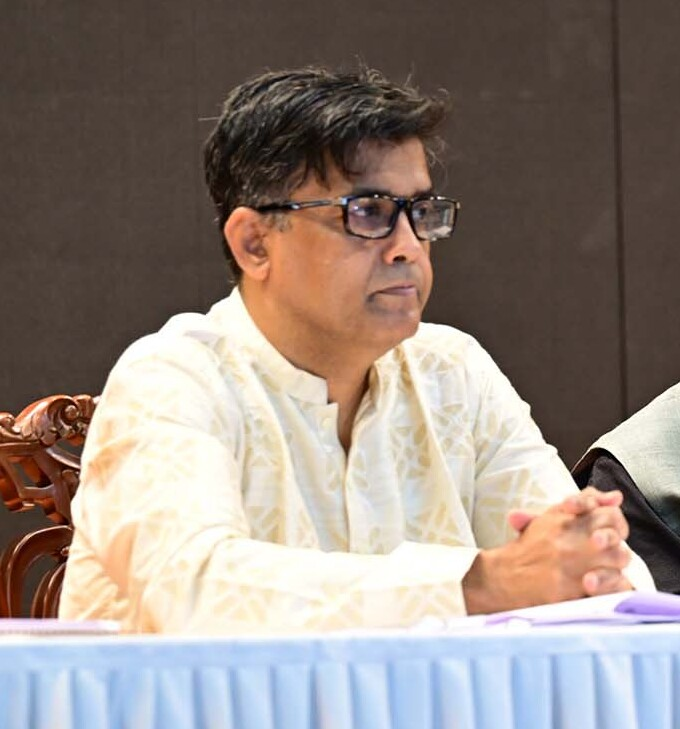
Alam at a press conference

In August 2024, Shafiqul Alam was appointed as the press secretary to the chief adviser of Bangladesh, Muhammad Yunus. His appointment was confirmed through a gazette notification by the Ministry of Public Administration.

== Return to Journalism ==
The press wing of the interim government officially concluded its duties on 17 February, following the swearing-in of the newly elected government. After serving as press secretary to the Chief Adviser, Shafiqul Alam returned to journalism. He joined the newly established English-language daily Daily Waadaa as its editor.

In August 2026, Shafiqul Alam commented on the future of journalism in Bangladesh. He stated that the events of July 2024 would also influence the country's journalism landscape and that journalists of the post-July period would play a role in shaping Bangladesh's future.
