= Jatiya Press Club =

Professional club for journalists of Bangladesh

- Seal of the Jatiya Press Club

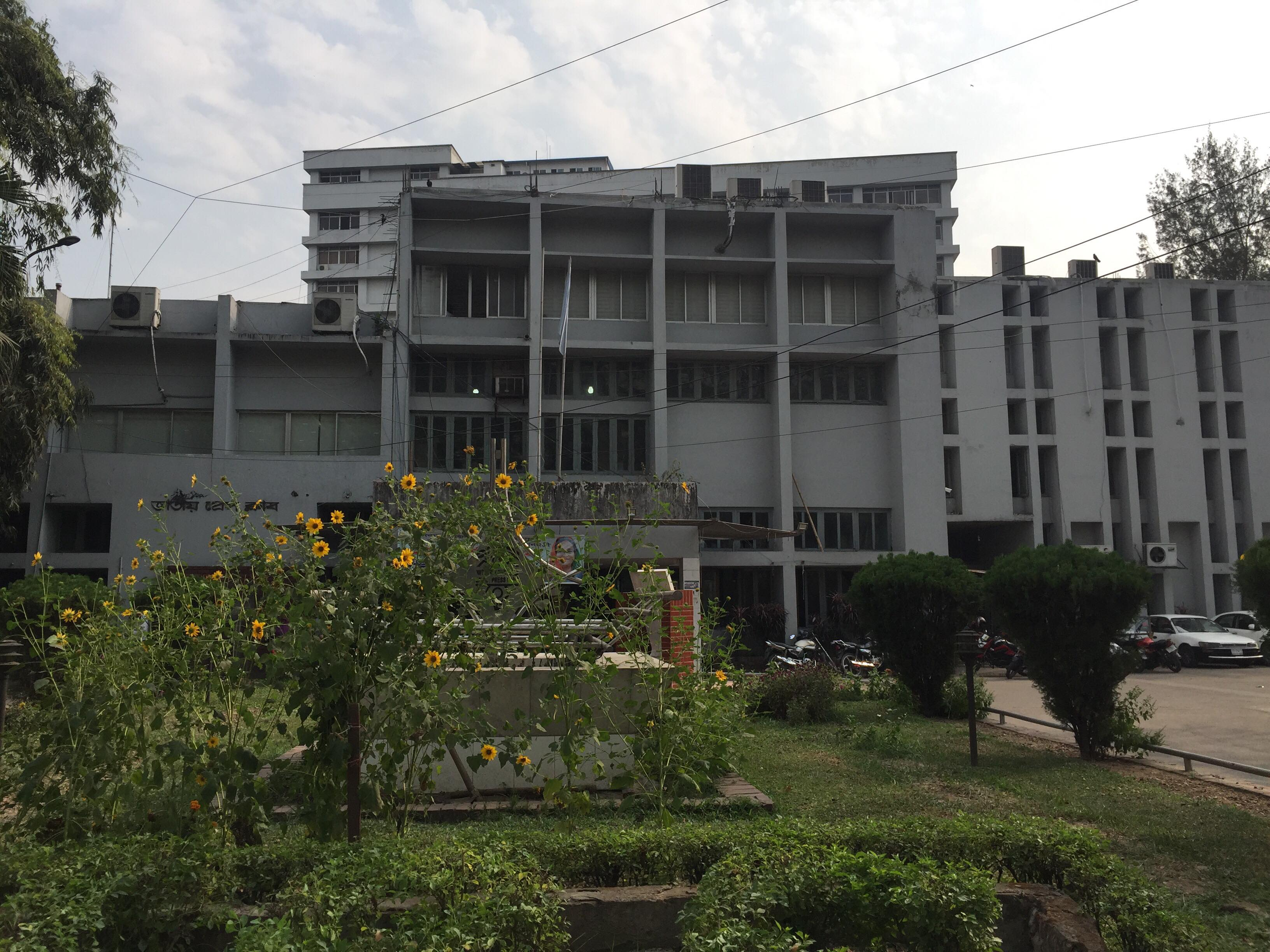
- Formation: 1954
- Headquarters: Segunbagicha, Dhaka, Bangladesh
- Region served: Bangladesh
- Members: 800
- Official language: Bengali
- Website: jatiyapressclub.com

Jatiya Press Club (Bengali: জাতীয় প্রেস ক্লাব, lit. 'National Press Club') is a Bangladeshi professional journalist club located in Segunbagicha, Dhaka.

== History ==
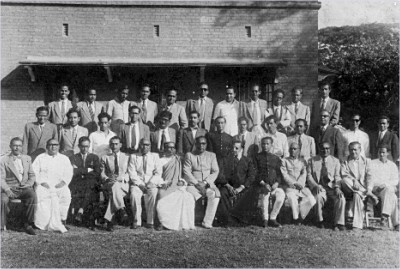
Huseyn Shaheed Suhrawardy, Prime Minister of Pakistan visited the Press Club in 1958

The Jatiya Press Club was founded in 1954 as the East Pakistan Press Club. It was formed to be run by an elected committee guided by its rules and regulations. The Government of East Pakistan rented out a building at 18, Topkhana Road, Segunbagicha at a monthly rent of Tk 100 to be used as the press club headquarters. The building before 1947 was a residential house of Dhaka University and was once the residence to physicist Satyendra Nath Bose.

The first life member of the club was N. M. Khan who was chief secretary of the provincial government. Mujibur Rahman Khan was the first president of the club. On 25 March Pakistan army started Operation Searchlight and shelled the club, the structure was completely destroyed. After the Independence of Bangladesh it was named the National Press Club. In 1977 the building was leased to the club permanently and the government of Bangladesh covered the expense of a new building. In 1995 the club's logo and emblem were selected.

From 2018 to 2020, Saiful Alam was the President and Farida Yasmin became the first woman general secretary of the Jatiya Press Club. In 2020, Farida Yasmin was elected the first woman president of the Jatiya Press Club, and Elias Khan was elected general secretary. Farida was re-elected the club's president and Shyamal Dutta was elected general secretary.

After the fall of the Sheikh Hasina-led Awami League government, the office of the president and general secretary of the Jatiya Press Club was vandalised and forcefully occupied after Abdul Hannan Masud of the quota movement demanded their resignation and banning Awami League-supporting journalists from the profession. The office of Shyamal Dutta of the Jatiya Press Club, National Press Club of Bangladesh, was vandalised, and he was prevented from leaving Bangladesh. On 12 August 2024, a section of Jatiya Press Club's managing committee revoked the memberships of its president, Farida Yasmin, general secretary, Shyamal Dutta and managing committee member, Shahnaj Siddiqui Soma.

== Structure ==
The Jatiya Press Club offers journalists three kinds of membership, first is life membership, second is permanent membership for professional journalists and the third is associate membership for public relations personnel. Associate members do not get voting rights. The National Press Club currently has about 800 members. The press club is managed by a 17-member executive council.
