= Dhaka Union of Journalists =

Trade union of journalists

DUJ
- Dhaka Union of Journalists
- Founded: 1947
- Headquarters: Dhaka, Bangladesh
- Official language: Bengali
- Key people: Sajjadul Alam Khan Topu, President; Akhtar Hossain, General Secretary

The Dhaka Union of Journalists (Bengali: ঢাকা সাংবাদিক ইউনিয়ন, romanized: Ḍhākā sāmbādika i'uniẏana) is a trade union of journalists based in Dhaka, Bangladesh. Sajjadul Alam Khan Topu is the union's president and Akhtar Hossain its general secretary. The union monitors freedom of speech and violence against journalists in Bangladesh.

== History ==
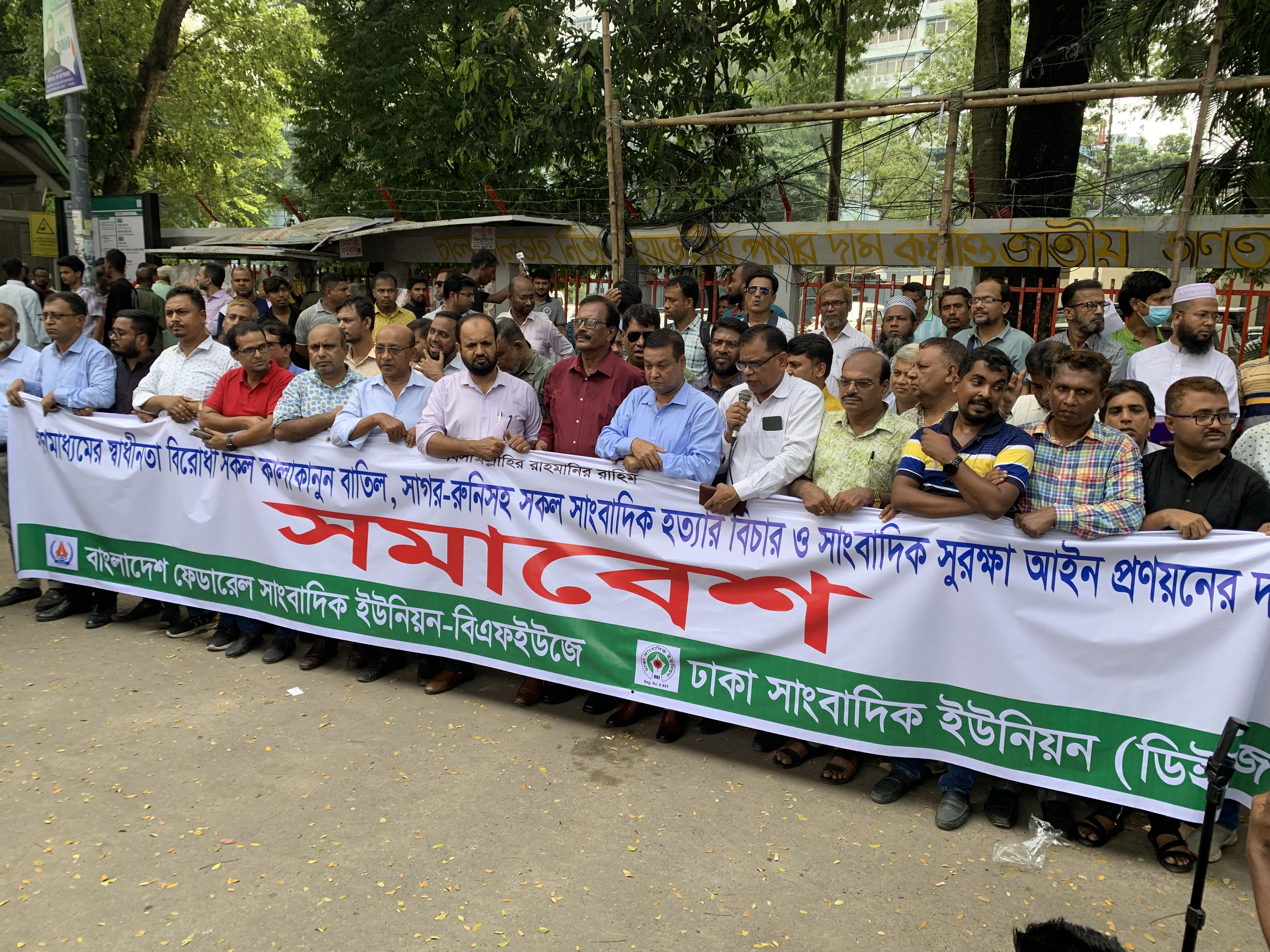
Protest rally of Dhaka Journalist Union demanding justice for Murder of Sagar Sarowar and Meherun Runi-2024

The Dhaka Union of Journalists was founded in 1947. It called for wages to be increased for journalists in the ninth wage board. In 2017, the union protested to demand repeal of section 57 of the Information and Communication Technology Act, calling it a ploy to oppress journalists.

Following the 2025 murder of journalist Md Asaduzzaman Tuhin in Gazipur, the DUJ issued a condemnation of the murder and called for increased pressure on law enforcement to arrest the killers. In 2026, the union advocated for the release of journalists arrested following the July Uprising during the interim government of Muhammad Yunus.
