= List of newspapers in Bangladesh =

This list of newspapers in Bangladesh is a list of newspapers printed and distributed in Bangladesh. Newspapers published in Bangladesh are written in Bengali or English language versions. Most Bangladeshi daily newspapers are usually printed in broadsheets; few daily tabloids exist. Daily newspapers in Bangladesh are published in the capital, Dhaka, as well as in major regional cities such as Chittagong, Khulna, Rajshahi, Rangpur, Sylhet, and Barisal. All daily newspapers are morning editions; there are no evening editions in Bangladesh. Some newspapers offer online versions.

== Notable daily newspapers ==
=== Bengali-language newspapers ===
Newspaper name		Nameplate	Founded	Owner/Publisher	Editor	Region	Circulation (May, 2021)
English	Bengali	Nameplate	Founded	Owner/Publisher	Editor	Region	Circulation (May, 2021)
Bangladesh Pratidin	বাংলাদেশ প্রতিদিন		2010,15 March	East West Media Group	Abu Taher (Acting Editor)	National	553,300
Prothom Alo	প্রথম আলো		1998,4 November	Transcom Group	Matiur Rahman	National	525,801
Jugantor	দৈনিক যুগান্তর		1999,1 February	Jamuna Group	Saiful Alam	National	290,200
Kaler Kantho	কালের কন্ঠ		2010,10 January	East West Media Group	Hasan Hafiz	National	290,200
The Daily Ittefaq	দৈনিক ইত্তেফাক		1953,24 December	Ittefaq Group of Publications Ltd.	Tasmima Hossain	National	290,200
Janakantha	দৈনিক জনকণ্ঠ		1993,21 February	Globe Janakantha Shilpa Paribar	Mohammad Atikullah Khan Masud	National	290,200
Samakal	দৈনিক সমকাল		2005,31 May	Times Media Limited	Mustafiz Shafi	National	271,000
Amader Shomoy	দৈনিক আমাদের সময়		2003,2 October	New Vision Limited	Mohammad Golam Sarwar	National	270,000
Amar Desh	আমার দেশ		2004	Mahmudur Rahman	Mahmudur Rahman	National	
Bhorer Kagoj	ভোরের কাগজ		1992,15 February	Saber Hossain Chowdhury	Shyamal Dutta	National	161,160
Manab Zamin	দৈনিক মানবজমিন		1997	Mahbuba Chowdhury	Matiur Rahman Chowdhury	National	161,100
Alokito Bangladesh	আলোকিত বাংলাদেশ		2013	Alokito Media Ltd.	Kazi Rafiqul Alam	National	152,000
The Sangbad	দৈনিক সংবাদ		1951, 17 May	Alatamasa Kabir	Khandakar Muniruzzaman	National	127,000
Daily Inqilab	দৈনিক ইনকিলাব		1986,4 June	Inqilab Enterprise & Publications Limited	A.M.M. Bahauddin	National	125,460
Jaijaidin	যায়যায়দিন		2006,6 June	Jaijaidin Publication Limited	Sayeed Hossain Chowdhury	National	116,000
Ajker Patrika	আজকের পত্রিকা		2021,27 June	US-Bangla Group	Golam Rahman	National	108,100
Daily Naya Diganta	দৈনিক নয়া দিগন্ত		2004,25 October	Diganta Media Corporation	Alamgir Mahiuddin	National	90,650
The Azadi	দৈনিক আজাদী		1960,5 September	MA Malek	MA Malek	National (published from Chattogram)	56,000
Desh Rupantor	দেশ রুপান্তর		2019,12 March	Rupayan Media and Communications Ltd	Kamal Uddin Sabuj		
The Daily Sangram	দৈনিক সংগ্রাম		1970,17 January	Bangladesh Publications Ltd.	Azam Mir Shahidul Ahsan	National	32,020
The Daily Shomoyer Alo	দৈনিক সময়ের আলো		2019, 2 March	Amin Mohammad Group	Syed Shahnewaz Karim	National	161,808
Amar Barta	আমার বার্তা						

=== English-language newspapers ===
Newspaper name	Nampeplate	Founded	Owner/Publisher	Editor	Region	Circulation
The Daily Star		1991,14 January	Transcom Group	Mahfuz Anam	National	44,814
The Financial Express	Logo of The Financial Express (Bangladesh)	1993	International Publications Limited	Shahiduzzaman Khan	National	39,010
Daily Sun		2010,23 October	East West Media Group	Md. Rezaul Karim Lotus	National	38,800
The Daily Observer		2011,1 February	Observer Ltd	Iqbal Sobhan Chowdhury	National	38,750
Dhaka Tribune	This is the logo for Dhaka Tribune.	2013,19 April	2A Media Limited	Reaz Ahmad	National	38,700
New Age		2003, June	Media New Age Limited	Nurul Kabir	National	38,600
The Independent(defunct)		1995, 26 March	Independent Publications Limited	M. Shamsur Rahman	National	37,800
The Business Standard		2020, 21 January	The Horizon Media and Publication Limited, Orion Group	Inam Ahmed	National	35,500

=== Online newspapers and portals ===
Newspaper Name		Founded Date	Owner/ Publisher	Editor
English	Bengali	Founded Date	Owner/ Publisher	Editor
BBC Bangla	বিবিসি বাংলা	1941, 11 October	Broadcasting House	Mir Sabbir
bdnews24.com	বিডি নিউজ ২৪	2006, 23 October	Bangladesh News 24 Hours Ltd.	Toufique Imrose Khalidi
Banglanews24.com	বাংলা নিউজ ২৪	2010, 1 June	East West Media Group	Lutfor Rahman Himel
Jagonews24.com	জাগোনিউজ২৪.কম	2014, 10 May	AKC Private Limited	K. M. Zeaul Haque
Bangla Tribune	বাংলা ট্রিবিউন	2014, 13 May	2A Media Limited	Zulfiqer Russell
Dhaka Mail	ঢাকা মেইল	2021, 15 December	Bijoy Bangla Media Limited	Mohiuddin Sarker
Dhaka Post	ঢাকা পোস্ট	2021, 16 February	Bijoy Bangla Media Limited	Mohiuddin Sarker

== Monthly/weekly newspapers and magazines ==
- Monthly Madina, most widely circulated monthly that has been published since 1961
- Forum, a human rights oriented magazine published between 1969 and 1971, re-established in 2006
- Dhaka Courier, English-language news magazine founded in 1984, it is the longest running English current affairs magazine in the country.
- Holiday, an English-language weekly newspaper
- ICE Today, an English-language fashion and lifestyle magazine
- Weekly Blitz, an English-language tabloid weekly founded in 2003 and edited by Salah Choudhury

== News agencies ==
Before 1972, news agencies in Bangladesh were local branches of international agencies.

- Bangladesh Sangbad Sangstha (BSS), the official government-owned news agency of Bangladesh, was created on 1 January 1972 from the Dhaka bureau of the state-owned. Abul Kalam Azad, who was formerly Prime Minister Sheikh Hasina's press secretary, became its chief editor in 2014. Associated Press of Pakistan (APP) (no relation to Associated Press (AP)) was the previous name of this organization. But the name changed after independence of Bangladesh. It exchanges news with AFP, Xinhua, Press Trust of India (PTI), APP(Pakistan) and other foreign agencies.
- United News of Bangladesh (UNB) is a private news agency in service since 1988. It partners with AP, United News of India (UNI), and other foreign agencies.

== Defunct newspapers ==
- Ajker Kagoj (Bengali: দৈনিক আজকের কাগজ; "Today's Paper"), a Bengali-language newspaper published in the modern approach between 1991 and 2007.
- The Bangladesh Observer, an English-language daily published between 1949-2010 and last edited by Iqbal Sobhan Chowdhury.
- Kishore Bangla, a Bengali juvenile weekly published between 1977 and 1983.
- Daily Banglar Bani, a Bengali-language newspaper.
- The Kohinoor, a Bengali-language monthly published from 1898 to 1912.
- The Daily Dinkal, a Bengali-language daily published from 1986 to 2023.

== See also ==
- Mass media in Bangladesh
- Telecommunications in Bangladesh
- List of companies of Bangladesh
