= The Daily Shomoyer Alo =

Daily newspaper in Bangladesh

- 10 June 2026 cover of Daily Shomoyer Alo
- Type: Daily newspaper
- Format: Broadsheet and online edition
- Owner: Amin Mohammad Group
- Publisher: Gazi Ahmed Ullah
- Editor: Shairul Kabir Khan (advisory editor)
- News editor: Syed Shahnewaz Karim
- Founded: 2 March 2019; 7 years ago
- Language: Bengali
- Headquarters: Nasir Trade Center, 89, Bir Uttam C.R. Dutta Road (Sonargaon Road), Bangla Motor, Dhaka
- Circulation: 1 lakh 61 thousands 808
- Website: www.shomoyeralo.com

The Daily Shomoyer Alo is a daily newspaper from Bangladesh and published in the Bengali-language. It was first published on 2 March 2019, with the inauguration of the Home Minister of Bangladesh, Asaduzzaman Khan Kamal, and the Prime Minister's Information Advisor, Iqbal Sobhan Chowdhury. It has an online edition and an e-paper edition in addition to the broadsheet. Amin Mohammad Media Communication Limited publishes the newspaper.

== History ==
The Daily Somoyer Alo is printed in 'broadsheet' format. It uses brown newsprint paper. Number of columns 8. In addition to the online version, the newspaper is printed in four colors and has an e-paper. Regular issue 12 pages. Gazi Ahmed Ullah on behalf of the owner and publisher of the newspaper Amin Mohammad Media Communication Limited. Acting Editor Syed Shahnewaz Karim.

In February 2026, Shairul Kabir Khan, a member of the Bangladesh Nationalist Party, has joined the Daily Shomoyer Alo as an advisory editor.

== Features ==
The following are the regular events organized in the light of the daily news:

- News
- City-town
- Bangla of time
- Happy time
- Game
- Editorial
- Literature
- The light of Islam

== Promotion and readership ==
The number of copies of Shomoyer Alo is 161,808.

== See also ==
- List of newspapers in Bangladesh
- Bangladesh Sangbad Sangstha
- United News of Bangladesh
- Amader Shomoy
