= Kamal Uddin Majumder (journalist) =

Bangladeshi journalist

MD and chief editor of Bangladesh Sangbad Sangstha
- Incumbent
- Assumed office 7 April 2026
- Succeeded by: Mahbub Morshed

Personal details
- Education: Chittagong University
- Occupation: Journalist

Kamal Uddin Majumder (commonly known as Kamal Uddin Sabuj) is a Bangladeshi journalist. He is the managing director (MD) and Editor-in-Chief of the Bangladesh Sangbad Sangstha (BSS). He succeeded Mahbub Morshed in this role.

== Early life and education ==
Majumder was born to Sultan Ahmed Mozumder and Jebun Naher Begum in Banshpara village under Chhagalnaiya Upazila of Feni District. He completed his bachelor's and master's degrees in English Language and Literature from the University of Chittagong.

== Career ==
He has had a long career in journalism spanning several decades. He began his journalism career in 1985 as a staff reporter at the now-defunct The Daily News. He later joined the United News of Bangladesh (UNB), where he worked from 1988 to 1991. In 1991, he joined the Bangladesh Sangbad Sangstha (BSS).

He held senior positions in leading media organizations in Bangladesh. Most recently, he served as the Editor-in-Chief of the daily newspaper Desh Rupantor. He also served as elected president and general secretary of the National Press Club twice.

=== Appointment as BSS managing director ===
On 7 April 2026, the Ministry of Public Administration issued a notification appointing Kamal Uddin Majumder as the managing director and Editor-in-Chief of the Bangladesh Sangbad Sangstha on a contractual basis for a term of one year.
