= Amar Barta =

Daily newspaper in Bangladesh

Amar Barta আমার বার্তা
- 2 July 2026 cover of Daily Amar Barta
- Type: Daily newspaper
- Format: Broadsheet
- Publisher: Md Jasim Uddin
- Editor: Md Jasim Uddin
- Founded: 1 February 2014; 12 years ago
- Language: Bengali
- Headquarters: Saiham Skyview Tower (9th Floor), 45 Bijoy Nagar, Dhaka-1000
- Country: Bangladesh
- Circulation: 160,000 (as of 2020)
- Website: www.amarbarta.com

Amar Barta is a national daily newspaper published from Dhaka, Bangladesh. As of 2020, it has a circulation of 160,000. It was first published on 1 February 2014.

== Related pages ==
- Prothom Alo
- Bangladesh Pratidin
- The Daily Ittefaq

== See also ==
- List of newspapers in Bangladesh
- Bangladesh Sangbad Sangstha
- The Daily Shomoyer Alo
