= Kishore Bangla =

Bangladeshi magazine

- Publisher: Observer House
- Editor-in-chief: Iqbal Sobhan Chowdhury
- Editor: Mir Mosharref Hossain Pakbir
- Founded: 1977
- Website: kishorebangla.com

Kishore Bangla (Bengali: কিশোর বাংলা) is a Bangladeshi juvenile magazine. Its the first juvenile weekly magazine ever published in the Bengali language in the Indian subcontinent.

== Background ==
The publication of this newspaper commenced in 1977 at the behest of the Bangladesh government. It was published from the 'Observer House' and the eminent journalist and editor of weekly cine-magazine the Chitrali, Syed Mohammad Parvez, was appointed the editor. However, writer, journalist and children's organizer Rafiqul Haque, popularly known as Dadu bhai was in charge as its executive editor.

The Government of Bangladesh discontinued publication of Kishore Bangla in 1983. Since 2018, it is issued under a new ownership.

== Team ==
The work team of Kishore Bangla comprised, in addition to Rafiqul Haque, the eminent journalist Shah Alamgir, writer Abdur Rahman, actor and graphic artist Afzal Hossain, journalist Saiful Alam Lytton and author Mustafa Majid, among others. Najimuddin Manik, Faizul Latif Chowdhury, and Syed Borhan Kabir also there worked for some time.

== Contributors ==
Regular contributors to the Kishore Bangla included children's author Fayez Ahmed, Ali Imam, Mobarak Hossain Khan, Tofazzal Hossain, Shahriar Kabir, Muhammed Zafar Iqbal, Faridur Reza Sagar, Rokeya Sultana, Rhymer Rabbani Choudhury, poet Abu Hassan Shahriar, writer Faizul Latif Chowdhury, Ahmed Mazhar, novelist Nasreen Jahan, Imdadul Hoque Milon rhyme-composer Faruque Hossain, Amirul Islam and Lutfar Rahman Riton.

== Novels ==
Some of the novels published in the Kishore Bangla were "Nulia chorir shonar pahar", "Dipu Number Two" and "Operation Kakonpur".

== Circulation ==
Kishore Bangla was published every Friday. It was a multi-coloured newspaper that was meant only for children. It was unique in its kind because it was a newspaper, rather than a literary magazine that was published on a weekly basis for a long period of time. Starting from mid-1970s, it made significant contribution in moulding and grooming the mindset of boys and girls of middle-class Bangladesh in a positive way.

Kishore Bangla was re-introduced for its readers with new look and feel later. Now it is a publication of Mohammadi Group of Companies Ltd.

== Current publication ==
Iqbal Sobhan Chowdhury, a prominent journalist of Bangladesh, former editor of Bangladesh Observer, editor of The Daily Observer and chairman of Dhaka Bangla Channel (DBC) is the chairman of the board of editors of Kishore Bangla.

Mir Mosharref Hossain, another eminent journalist, chairman of Mohammadi Group of Companies Ltd., a director of The Daily Observer, chief editor of Mohammadi News Agency (MNA) and chief patron of children's organization Bangabandhu Shishu Kishore Mela is the editor of the magazine.

Readers can read the magazine online. The office of Kishore Bangla is located at Aziz Bhaban (9th floor), 93, Motijheel C/A, Dhaka-1000, Bangladesh.

== See also ==
- List of newspapers in Bangladesh
