= The Daily Sangram =

Daily newspaper of Bangladesh

- 11 September 2023 cover of Dainik Sangram.
- Type: Daily newspaper
- Format: Broadsheet
- Owner: Bangladesh Publication Limited
- Publisher: Al Falah Printing Press
- Editor: Azam Mir Shahidul Ahsan
- Founded: January 17, 1970; 56 years ago
- Political alignment: Right-wing
- Language: Bengali
- Headquarters: 423, Elephant Road, Bara Moghbazar, Dhaka - 1217
- Country: Bangladesh
- Website: dailysangram.com

The Daily Sangram, also known as Dainik Sangram (Bengali: দৈনিক সংগ্রাম, Doinik Shôŋgram, translation: "Daily Struggle"), is a Bengali daily newspaper and published from Dhaka, Bangladesh, it is the mouthpiece of Bangladesh Jamaat-e-Islami. The name of the editor is Azam Mir Shahidul Ahsan. The Daily Sangram publishes both Bangladesh-related and international news, as well as local and regional perspectives. It also provides entertainment, business, science, technology, sports, movies, travel, jobs, education, health, environment, human-rights news and more.

== History ==
In January 1970, The Daily Sangram was established and began its publication in East Pakistan.

=== Bangladesh War of Independence ===
Before and during the Bangladesh War of Independence in 1971, Daily Sangram functioned as the mouthpiece of the then East Pakistan branch of Jamaat-e-Islami. Jamaat-e-Islami opposed Bangladesh’s independence and through Daily Sangram, carried out campaigns to build public opinion against the independence movement. At that time, leaders of Jamaat and its student wing, such as Ghulam Azam and Ali Ahsan Mohammad Mojaheed, regularly had various statements published in the newspaper following the launch of Operation Searchlight. Abdul Quader Molla and Muhammad Kamaruzzaman, both later were convicted of crimes against humanity and executed after the verdicts of the Supreme Court of Bangladesh, served as executive editors of the paper.

=== Homosexuality ===
Human rights organizations have criticized Daily Sangram for publishing homophobic statements and misinformation about LGBTQ issues. Justice makers Bangladesh, along with its France-based affiliate, urged the newspaper to apologize to the LGBTQ community and stop publishing content that spreads hatred or false claims. The newspaper has published articles asserting that students in Bangladesh are developing “homosexual inclinations,” that some nations face destruction because of homosexuality, and that homosexuals are mentally disordered and spread incurable diseases. These views have drawn condemnation from activists and advocacy groups.

=== 2019 sedition case ===
In December 2019, Daily Sangram editor, Abul Asad was arrested after the newspaper described Abdul Quader Molla, a former Jamaat-e-Islami leader and Daily Sangram executive editor who had been executed in 2013 for accusations of participating in massacring unarmed civilians during the Bangladesh War of Independence in 1971 as a “martyr”, Both Asad and reporter Ruhul Amin Gazi were charged with sedition over the publication. The international Committee to Protect Journalists (CPJ) urged the Bangladeshi authorities to release them. Asad was granted bail in late 2020, and Gazi was released in March 2022.

== See also ==
- List of newspapers in Bangladesh
- Bengali-language newspapers
- Daily Nayadiganta
- Daily Inqilab
- Desh Rupantor
