= The Daily Observer (Bangladesh) =

English-language newspaper in Bangladesh

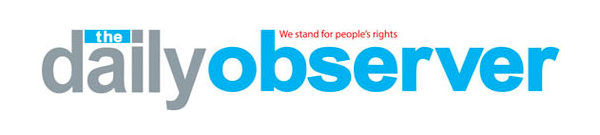
- Type: Daily newspaper
- Format: Broadsheet
- Owner(s): Observer Ltd
- Publisher: Observer Ltd
- Editor: Iqbal Sobhan Chowdhury
- Founded: 1 February 2011
- Language: English
- Headquarters: 93, Motijheel C/A (2nd Floor), Dhaka-1000, Bangladesh.
- Website: observerbd.com

The Daily Observer is an English-language newspaper in Bangladesh. The founding editor is Iqbal Sobhan Chowdhury, who was the former editor of The Bangladesh Observer.

== History ==
The Daily Observer hit the stands in Bangladesh on 1 February 2011. Iqbal Sobhan Chowdhury, the last editor of Bangladesh Observer, started the circulation of a new newspaper by the name of The Daily Observer in 2011.

The editor was sued by MP Nizam Uddin Hazari, an AL politician, in 2017 for publishing an allegedly defamatory article mentioning him.

== See also ==
- List of newspapers in Bangladesh
- The Daily Star (Bangladesh)
- Dhaka Tribune
- Prothom Alo
