= Nobonita Chowdhury =

Bangladeshi journalist, singer, news editor and television host

- নবনীতা চৌধুরী
- Education: University of Dhaka
- Occupations: Journalist, singer, television host
- Awards: Anannya Top Ten Award, 2017

Nobonita Chowdhury is a Bangladeshi journalist, singer and director of the Preventing Violence Against Women Initiative at BRAC, the largest non-governmental organization in Bangladesh. She was an editor of DBC News and a television talk show host at channel 71.

== Early life and education ==
Chowdhury got her Bachelor of Laws at the University of Dhaka. She got her Master's at School of Oriental and African Studies of the University of London.

== Career ==
Chowdhury started her career at the Bhorer Kagoj. She worked there till 2000 and then joined Ekushey Television. She has worked for Bitopi, BBC World Services, Ice Media Ltd publisher of Ice Today, and Robi Axiata Limited.

Chowdhury moderated a panel at the Dhaka Lit Fest 2016 called Juddho Sheshe Juddho which discussed Bengali Muslim identity and secularism.

In 2017, Chowdhury was awarded the Anannya Top Ten Award.

Chowdhury joined as the director of the Preventing Violence Against Women Initiative at BRAC in 2019, leaving DBC News. She participated in the Facebook South Asia Safety Summit-2019 in India. She hosted Mastermind Family Bangladesh, the Bangladeshi version of Mastermind (British game show).

Chowdhury is a member of the executive committee of Bangladesh Nari Sangbadik Kendra (A Center for Women Journalist, Bangladesh). She sang at Praner Khela programme in Bengal Shilpalaya. She released an album with Bengal Foundation called Song of Three Mahajans.

After the resignation of Prime Minister Sheikh Hasina and the fall of the Awami League government, lawyer Gazi MH Tamim filed a complaint of genocide against Sheikh Hasina and 32 journalists, including Chowdhury, with the Investigation Agency-ICTBD, the investigative arm of the International Crimes Tribunal, on 29 August 2024. Reporters Without Borders condemned the filing of the case. In June 2025, she started hosting her own show named Nobonita Chowdhurir Boyan on Facebook and YouTube, where she discusses various contemporary political issues.

== Personal life ==
Chowdhury's sister, Nirupoma Rahman, is a singer. The two sisters studied music while growing up.
