= Feni-2 =

Bangladeshi parliamentary constituency

Coordinates: 23.02°N 91.39°E

- Constituency for the Jatiya Sangsad
- District: Feni District
- Division: Chittagong Division
- Electorate: 437,078 (2026)

Current constituency
- Created: 1984
- Party: Bangladesh Nationalist Party
- Member: Joynal Abedin
- ← 265 Feni-1 267 Feni-3 →

Feni-2 is a constituency represented in the Jatiya Sangsad (National Parliament) of Bangladesh since 2026 by Joynal Abedin of the Bangladesh Nationalist Party.

== Boundaries ==
The constituency encompasses Feni Sadar Upazila.

== History ==
The constituency was created in 1984 from a Noakhali constituency when the former Noakhali District was split into three districts: Feni, Noakhali, and Lakshmipur.

Ahead of the 2008 general election, the Election Commission redrew constituency boundaries to reflect population changes revealed by the 2001 Bangladesh census. The 2008 redistricting altered the boundaries of the constituency.

== Members of Parliament ==
Election	Member	Party
1986	Joynal Hazari	Awami League
1988	Joynal Abedin	Bangladesh Nationalist Party
1991	Joynal Hazari	Awami League
Feb 1996	vacant	
Jun 1996	Joynal Hazari	Awami League
2001	Joynal Abedin	Bangladesh Nationalist Party
2008	Joynal Abedin	Bangladesh Nationalist Party
2014	Nizam Uddin Hazari	Awami League
2018	Nizam Uddin Hazari	Awami League
2024	Nizam Uddin Hazari	Awami League
2026	Joynal Abedin	Bangladesh Nationalist Party

== Elections ==
=== Elections in the 2020s ===
General election 2026: Feni-2
Party	Candidate	Votes	%	±%
BNP	Joynal Abedin	131,210		
AB Party	Mohammad Mujibur Rahman Bhuiyan	80,058		
Majority		51,152		
Turnout				
Registered electors		437,078		
BNP gain from AL				

=== Elections in the 2010s ===
Nizam Uddin Hazari was elected unopposed in the 2014 general election after opposition parties withdrew their candidacies in a boycott of the election.

=== Elections in the 2000s ===
General Election 2008: Feni-2
Party	Candidate	Votes	%	±%
BNP	Joynal Abedin	120,297	57.5	−3.9
AL	Iqbal Sobhan Chowdhury	86,713	41.5	+5.8
BJP	Kazi Mominul Hoque	885	0.4	N/A
BKA	Ibrahim Kholil Ullah	745	0.4	N/A
BSD	Haradhan Chakrabarty	456	0.2	N/A
Majority		33,584	16.1	−9.6
Turnout		209,096	80.1	+11.9
BNP hold				

General Election 2001: Feni-2
Party	Candidate	Votes	%	±%
BNP	Joynal Abedin	115,278	61.4	+20.6
AL	Joynal Hazari	67,025	35.7	−9.0
Independent	Md. Akram Hossain	1,860	1.0	N/A
IJOF	Tajul Islam	722	0.4	N/A
Independent	Mohammad Main Uddin	625	0.3	N/A
BIF	Masum Faruki	531	0.3	+0.1
Independent	Shawkat Osman	463	0.2	N/A
Independent	Golam Faruk	302	0.2	N/A
JSD	Md. Noor Nabi	269	0.1	N/A
Bangladesh Samajtantrik Dal (Basad-Khalekuzzaman)	Haradhan Chakrabarty	219	0.1	N/A
Independent	A. S. M. Yasin	120	0.1	N/A
Independent	Liakat Ali	118	0.1	N/A
Independent	Shukdevna Nath	109	0.1	N/A
Independent	Haroonar Rashid Majumder	56	0.0	N/A
Independent	Mosharaf Hossain Hazari Mia	41	0.0	N/A
Majority		48,253	25.7	+21.8
Turnout		187,738	68.2	−4.0
BNP gain from AL				

=== Elections in the 1990s ===
General Election June 1996: Feni-2
Party	Candidate	Votes	%	±%
AL	Joynal Hazari	68,566	44.7	+5.2
BNP	Ferdaus Ahmed Qureshi	62,647	40.8	+7.5
Jamaat	Mohammad Liakat Ali Bhuiyan	11,933	7.8	−12.6
Jatiya Samajtantrik Dal-JSD	Joynal Abedin	5,770	3.8	N/A
JP(E)	Jafar Imam	1,507	1.0	−3.1
IOJ	Nurul Karim Balal	462	0.3	N/A
BIF	A. T. M. Kaikobad	375	0.2	N/A
Independent	Shah Alam Majumder	348	0.2	N/A
Bangladesh Samajtantrik Dal(Khalekuzzaman)	Joinal Abedin	341	0.2	−0.2
Zaker Party	Nur Mohammad Khan	333	0.2	−0.2
FP	Zia Uddin	249	0.2	N/A
Independent	Alamgir Kabir Chowdhury	224	0.1	N/A
Independent	M. Shajahan Saju	176	0.1	N/A
Independent	Amanat Ullah Aman	116	0.1	N/A
Independent	Jahid Hossain	107	0.1	N/A
Independent	Shuk Dev Nath	87	0.1	N/A
Independent	AKM Fakhrul Islam Chowdhury	78	0.1	N/A
Independent	AFM Azizul Bari	40	0.0	N/A
Majority		5,919	3.9	−2.3
Turnout		153,359	72.2	+31.9
AL hold				

General Election 1991: Feni-2
Party	Candidate	Votes	%	±%
AL	Joynal Hazari	44,000	39.5	
BNP	Shahid Uddin Ferdaus	37,045	33.3	
Jamaat	Mokbul Ahmad	22,670	20.4	
JP(E)	Zafarullah Khan	4,569	4.1	
Jatiya Janata Party and Gonotantrik Oikkya Jot	Mir Ahmad Bhuiyan	873	0.8	
NAP (Muzaffar)	Dr. Md. Muzibul Huq	686	0.6	
Zaker Party	Abu Bakar Siddique	416	0.4	
Bangladesh Samajtantrik Dal (Khalekuzzaman)	Joinal Abedin	403	0.4	
Independent	Fakhrul Islam	332	0.3	
CPB	Md. Ziauddin Ahmed Chowdhury	311	0.3	
Majority		6,955	6.2	
Turnout		111,305	40.3	
AL gain from JP(E)				
