= Ajker Patrika =

Bangladeshi newspaper

- 23-08-2023 cover of Ajker Patrika.
- Type: Daily newspaper
- Format: Broadsheet
- Owner: US-Bangla Group
- Publisher: Mohammad Abdullah Al Mamun
- Editor: Kamrul Hasan (Acting Editor)
- Founded: 27 June 2021
- Political alignment: Liberal
- Language: Bengali
- Headquarters: Dhaka, Bangladesh
- Website: ajkerpatrika.com

Ajker Patrika is a Bengali-language daily newspaper that is published in Dhaka, Bangladesh. The newspaper started publishing on 27 June 2021. Golam Rahman is the editor of Ajker Patrika. As of September 2022, the circulation of Ajker Patrika is around 108,100.

== History and details ==
The inaugural issue of Ajker Patrika was published on 27 June 2021. Its slogan is "Country's Local Newspaper". The head office of the newspaper in Banasree, Rampura of the capital Dhaka. In addition to the printed version, Ajker Patrika has online portal and e-paper as well. Ajker Patrika is printed in the form of a broadsheet newspaper using newsprint paper. It consists of 12 pages. Each page has 8 columns. This newspaper has 12 local editions. Ajker Patrka publishes news in different sections through its print and digital platforms. Notable amongst these are national, regional and international news, business, editorial, sports, entertainment, lifestyle, health, fact check, technology, education, career and environment. The online portal of Ajker Patrika includes assortment of news, features and information accompanied by pictures and videos. The e-paper site carries electronic newspaper of 12 regional editions of Ajker Patrika.

== See also ==
- List of newspapers in Bangladesh
- Prothom Alo
- The Daily Ittefaq
- Jugantor
- Daily Naya Diganta
- The Daily Star
- Desh Rupantor
