= Cheragi Pahar =

Cheragi Pahar চেরাগী পাহাড়
- Historical place
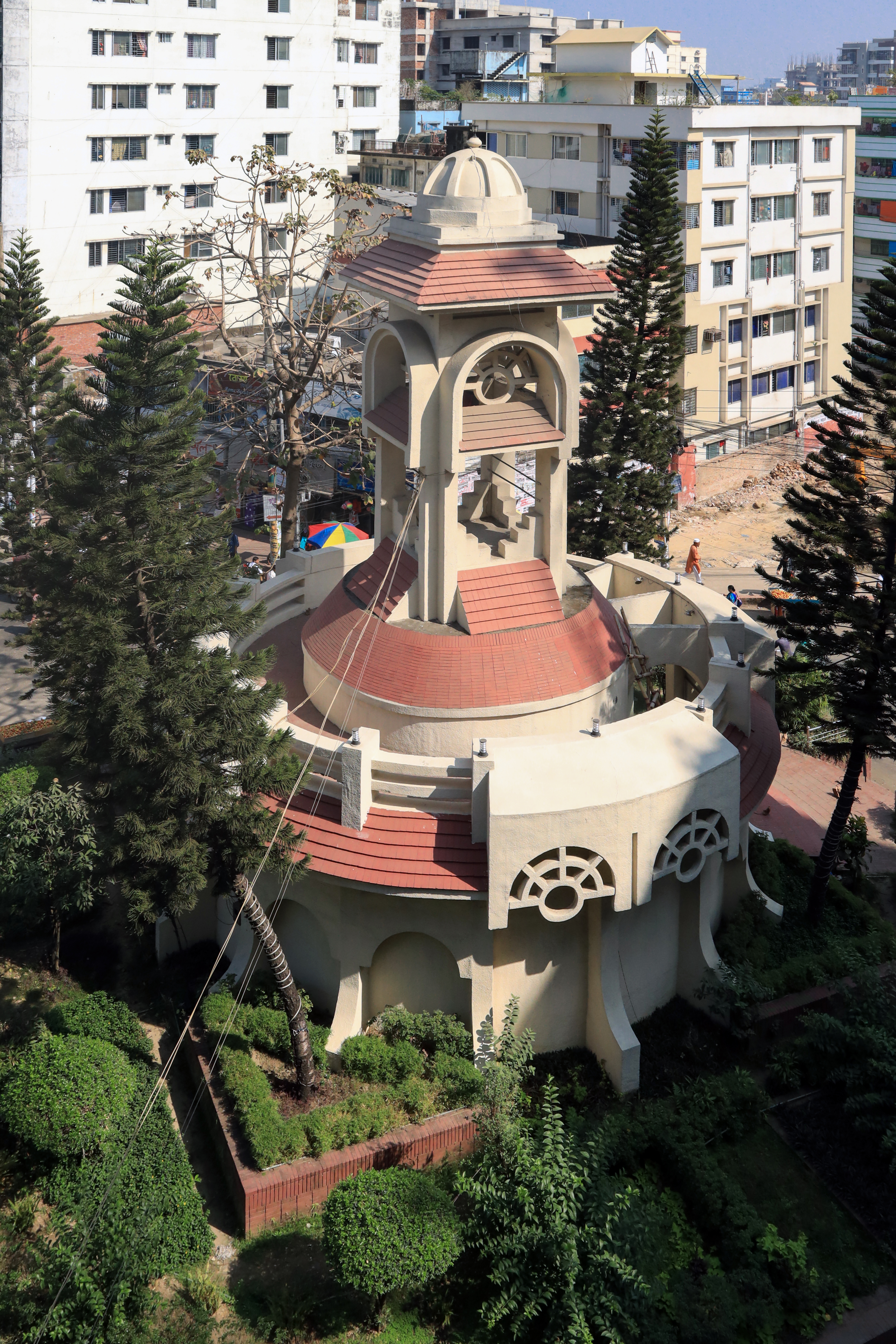
- Cheragi Pahar Circle
- Nicknames: Cheragi More, Cheragi Square
- Location of Cherai Pahar in Bangladesh Cheragi Pahar (Asia)
- Coordinates: 22.34367°N 91.83368°E
- Country: Bangladesh
- District: Chittagong
- Place: Cheragi Pahar

Government
  - Type: Mayor–council
  - Mayor: Khorshed Alam Sujon (City Administrator)
  - City Mayor: Chittagong City Corporation
- Demonym: Chittagonian
- Time zone: UTC+06:00 (BST)
- BTCL: 031

Cheragi Pahar (sometimes written Cheragee Pahar) is a cultural and historical place located at Chittagong, Bangladesh. Most of the cultural activities of Chittagong and related business were established in the place. Some parts of the region Momin Road are the part of Cheragee Pahar Circle.

== Cultural activities ==
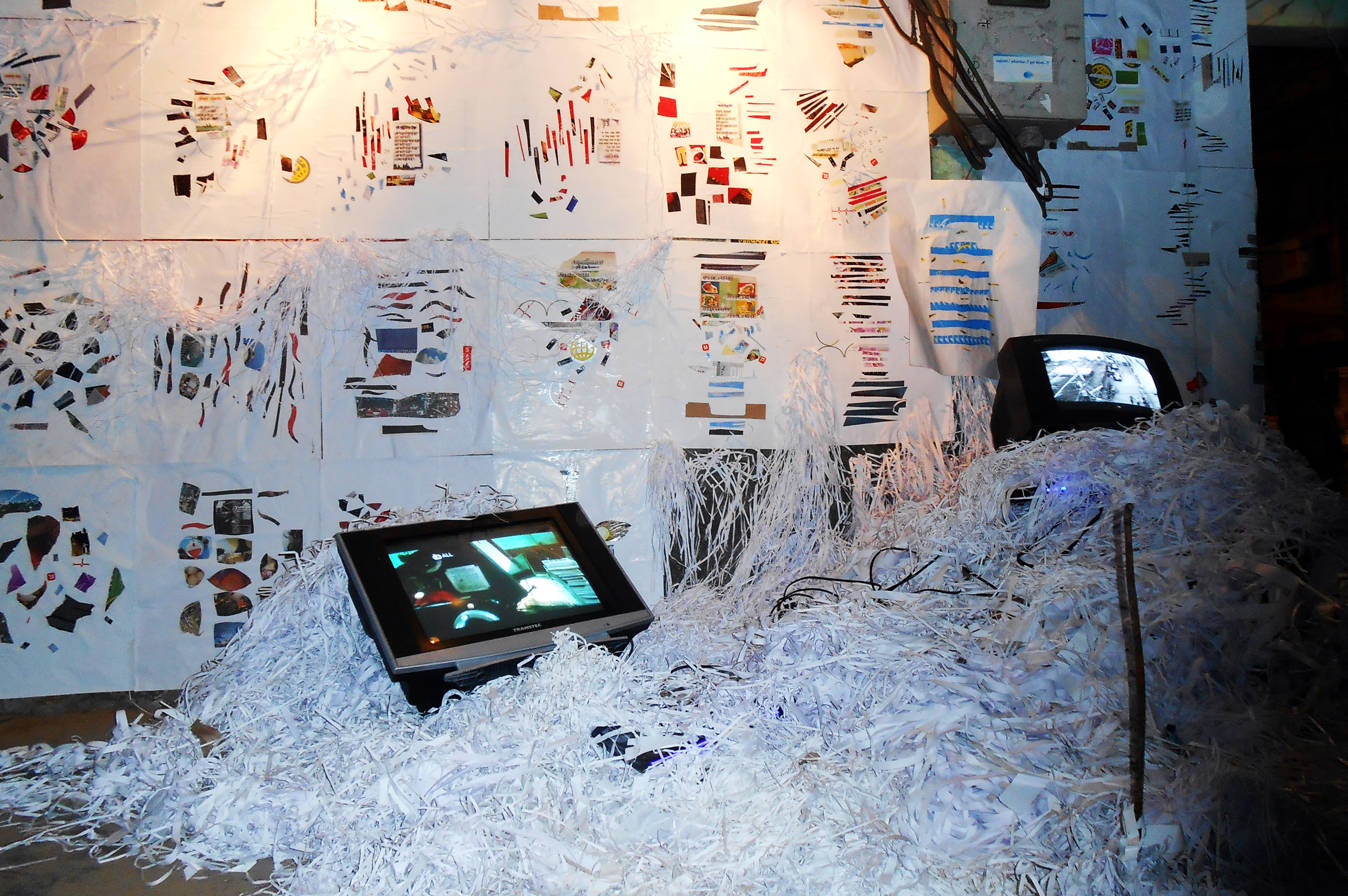
Cheragi Art Show 2, is a site specific art exhibition held in 2013.

The poets, authors, little magazine activist, artists, musicians, journalists, dramatist, model and cultural workers gather at Cheragee Pahar Circle every day. Pohela Boishakh, Pohela Falgun is celebrated in every year at the place.

In 2012, an art exhibition was held at the place.

== Media and communications ==
Several newspapers, including daily newspapers, opposition newspaper, business newspapers based in Chittagong are published from the place. Various little magazines are also published and distributed from Cheragi Pahar. BEside the newspapers offices, cultural-book shops can also be found here.

=== Newspaper publishes ===
- The Daily Azadi
- The Daily Bhorer Kagoj

== Gallery ==
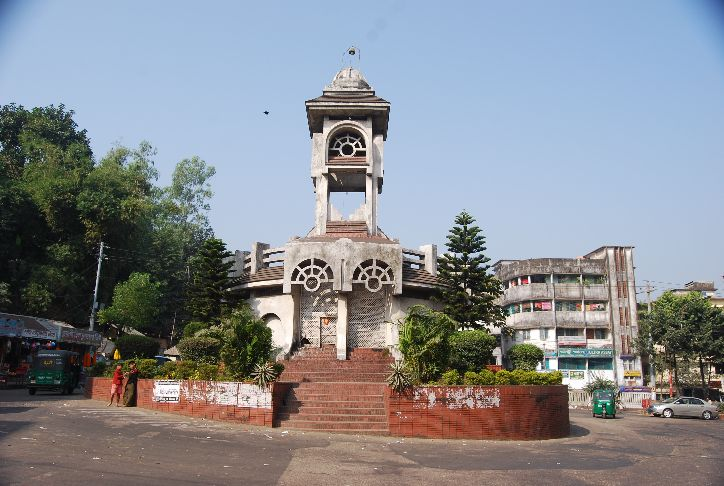
Cheragi Pahar Circle

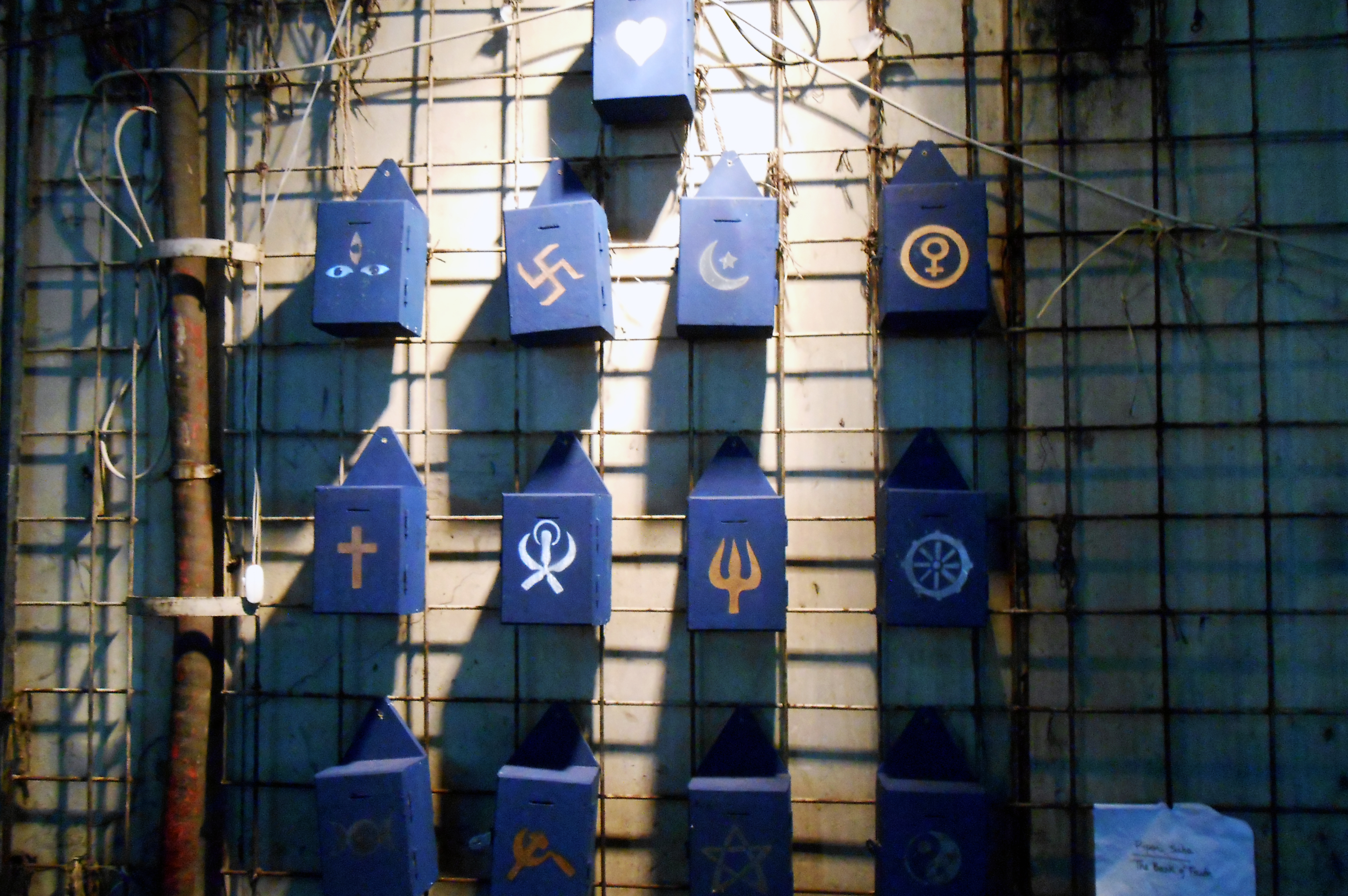
Cheragee Art Show 2, in 2013

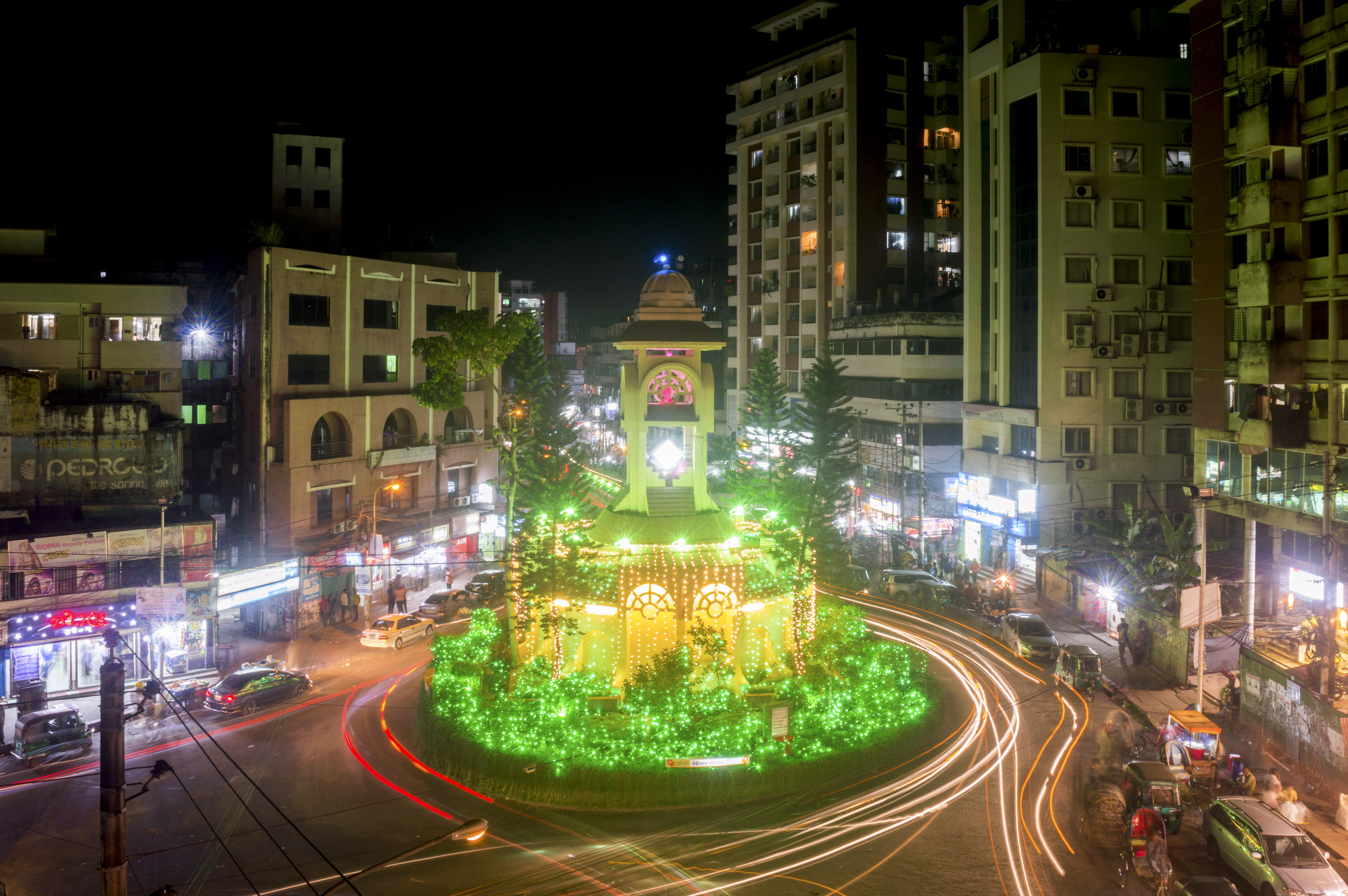
