= Mohammad Khaled =

Bangladeshi politician (1922–2003)

- মোহাম্মদ খালেদ

Member of Parliament for Chittagong-6
- In office 1973–1977
- Preceded by: Seats start
- Succeeded by: Zaheer Uddin Khan

Editor of The Azadi
- In office 1962–2003
- Preceded by: Abdul Khaleq
- Succeeded by: MA Malek

Personal details
- Born: 6 July 1922
- Died: 21 December 2003 (aged 81)
- Party: Bangladesh Awami League
- Relations: MA Malek (brother-in-law)

Mohammad Khaled (6 July 1922 – 21 December 2003) was a Bangladeshi politician, academic and journalist who was a member of parliament for the Chittagong-6 constituency. He was awarded the Swadhinata Puraskar by the government of Bangladesh in 2019 for his contribution to the war of liberation.

== Birth and early life ==
Mohammad Khaled was born on 6 July 1922 in Patna, the capital of the then British Indian state of Bihar, to Abdul Hadi Chowdhury. His ancestral home is Daroga Bari in Sultanpur village of Raozan in Chittagong. He completed his higher secondary and bachelor's degree from Chittagong College in 1942 and obtained his MA degree in the history of Islam from Calcutta University.

== Political and career ==
Mohammad Khaled was the editor of The Azadi from 1962 to 2003. He joined the anti-British movement in 1944 while studying at Calcutta University. He joined the Awami Muslim League in 1949. He played an active role in the education movement of 1962, the six-point movement of 1966 and the mass movement of 1969.

In the election of the then Pakistan National Assembly in 1970, he was elected as a member of the National Assembly by defeating the speaker of the National Assembly, Fazlul Quader Chowdhury, from Raozan-Hathazari parliamentary seat by a huge margin. During the War of Liberation in 1971, he was a member of the editorial board of Joy Bangla published as the mouthpiece of the Mujibnagar government. In 1972, he became a member of the 32-member Bangladesh Constitution Committee and contributed to the drafting of the constitution.

He was elected to parliament from Chittagong-6 as a Bangladesh Awami League candidate in 1973. When Bakshal was formed in 1975, he was appointed governor of Chittagong North District.

== Death ==
Mohammad Khaled died on 21 December 2003 in Chittagong.
