= Syed Fahim Munaim =

Bangladeshi journalist (1953–2016)

Syed Fahim Munaim (4 July 1953 – 1 June 2016) was a Bangladeshi journalist. He was the former press secretary to Chief Advisor Fakruddin Ahmed, ambassador of Bangladesh to Indonesia, and CEO of Maasranga Television.

== Early life ==
Munaim was born on 4 July 1953. His father, Syed Nuruddin, was a journalist. He studied at Mirzapur Cadet College. He did his undergraduate and graduate studies in public administration at the George Mason University.

== Career ==
Munaim started his journalism career at Sangbad as executive director. He worked as the managing editor of The Morning Sun and the weekly Dhaka Courier. He was the managing editor of United News of Bangladesh. He served as the press councilor at the Bangladesh Embassy in Japan in 1991.

Munaim joined The Daily Star on 10 June 1996. He was promoted to managing editor in December 1997. He was the managing editor of The Daily Star from 1997 to 2007.

In 2007, Munaim joined the caretaker government as press secretary to the chief advisor (equivalent to prime minister). In July 2007, he was appointed to the 12-member management committee of Bangladesh Cricket Board.

On 8 November 2008, Munaim was appointed the ambassador of Bangladesh to Indonesia.

On 1 February 2010, he was promoted to executive editor of The Daily Star. In March 2010, he left The Daily Star to join Maasranga Television, a subsidiary of Square Pharmaceuticals, as its chief editor and chief executive officer (CEO).

== Death ==
Munaim died on 1 June 2016 at his home in Gulshan, Dhaka, Bangladesh. He died from cardiac arrest. He was buried in Banani graveyard.
