= Ihsanul Karim =

Bangladeshi journalist (1951–2024)

- ইহসানুল করিম

Prime Minister's Press Secretary
- In office 15 June 2015 – 10 March 2024
- Preceded by: AKM Shamim Chowdhury
- Succeeded by: Nayeemul Islam Khan

President's Press Secretary
- In office 21 May 2013 – June 2015

Managing Director and Chief Editor of Bangladesh Sangbad Sangstha
- In office 2009 – 12 February 2013

Personal details
- Born: 5 January 1951
- Died: 10 March 2024 (aged 73) Dhaka, Bangladesh
- Education: Dhaka University
- Occupation: Journalist

Ihsanul Karim (Bengali: ইহসানুল করিম; 5 January 1951 – 10 March 2024) was a Bangladeshi journalist. He was the press secretary to the Prime Minister of Bangladesh. Prior to his appointment at the Prime Minister's Office, Karim worked as the Press Secretary to the President. He also served as the Managing Director and Chief Editor of Bangladesh Sangbad Sangstha (BSS), Bangladesh's state-run national news agency.

== Early life ==
Ihsanul Karim was born on 5 January 1951. He obtained his master's degree in economics from Dhaka University. He participated in the Bangladesh Liberation War in 1971 under the command of Mujib Bahini.

== Death ==
Karim died at Bangabandhu Sheikh Mujib Medical University on 10 March 2024, at the age of 73.
