= Tipu Sultan (journalist) =

Bangladeshi journalist

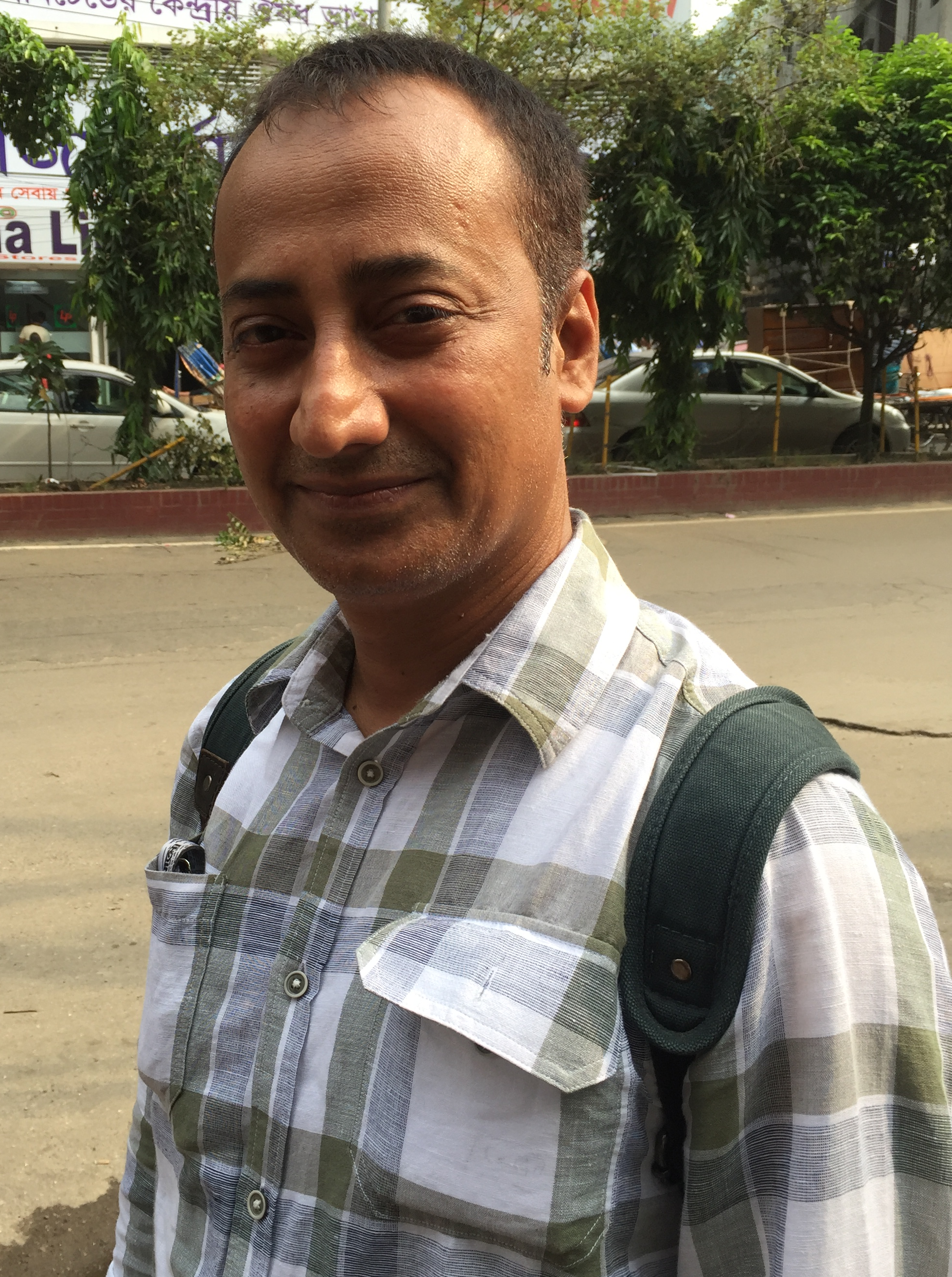
- Tipu Sultan, Dhaka 2018
- Born: c. 1973
- Occupation: Reporter
- Organizations: United News of Bangladesh (2000–01); Prothom Alo (2003–present)
- Known for: 2001 assault case
- Awards: CPJ International Press Freedom Award (2002)

Tipu Sultan (Bengali: টিপু সুলতান; born c. 1973) is a Bangladeshi freelance investigative journalist who received the CPJ International Press Freedom Award in 2002. He was the victim of a widely publicised attack instigated by a local politician that almost cost him his life.

== 2001 assault case ==
In January 2001, Tipu Sultan was working in Feni District where he investigated an arson attack on the Sultana Memorial Junior Girls School in Omarpur. The school that had just been completed. On 17 January, he filed a report for United News of Bangladesh, an independent wire service, implicating Joynal Hazari, an Awami League Member of Parliament nicknamed "the Godfather of Feni".

On 25 January 8 days after his report on the destruction of the school, a group of approximately fifteen masked men abducted Sultan. He was beaten with sticks, bats and rods, both of his legs and hands were deliberately broken. The assailants particularly focused on his right hand, which he used for writing. According to Sultan, his attackers told him, "This is the order of Hazari." After the beating, they left him unconscious beside the road.

The following day, Sultan was transferred to Pangu Hospital in Dhaka for further treatment, as well as for his own safety. However, Pangu medical personnel would not operate on his right hand for fear of reprisals from Hazari. He was discharged before his treatment was complete. A group of Bangladeshi journalists then launched an international campaign on Sultan's behalf and managed to source sufficient funding to finance the transfer to Bangkok, Thailand. He was treated by orthopaedic surgeons at the renowned Bumrungrad Hospital and regained the use of his right hand within a year.

Although Sultan attempted to file criminal charges against Hazari and his attackers, local police refused to investigate or even accept the complaint until forced to do so by a court order. Hazari denied any involvement in the attack. Following a change of government in late 2001, the police began to investigate the attack. On 16 April 2003, twenty-eight months after the original attack, Hazari and twelve other men were charged. However, eight of the thirteen suspects absconded, including Hazari, who had lost his seat in the 2001 general election and much of his political power. He was wanted for murder in an unrelated case and in 2003 was sentenced in absentia to life in prison. He is thought to have fled to India.

Bidan Majumder Sumon, one of the remaining suspects and the only person ever arrested for the attack, soon was released on bail. Sultan and his family received threats that they would be killed if they continued to pursue the case, causing Amnesty International to call for an "Urgent Action" letter-writing campaign on their behalf. A colleague and witness to the beating, Bakhtiar Islam Munna, was reportedly also threatened with death if he testified against Sultan's attackers. In the days leading up to the hearing, Munna was the subject of two murder attempts. In the second, a bomb was thrown at him near the entrance of his home. Munna escaped unharmed—the bomb only damaged the road—but withdrew his offer to testify. As Hazari could not be apprehended, the trial did not proceed.

According to the Committee to Protect Journalists (CPJ), the attack on Sultan became "symbolic of the rising tide of violence directed against the press in Bangladesh", leading to both national and international outcry. In November 2002, Sultan was awarded the CPJ International Press Freedom Award, "an annual recognition of courageous journalism". He was also a finalist for the 2001 Reporters sans frontières-Fondation de France Award, which went to Reza Alijani of Iran.

By 2003, Sultan had moved to Dhaka and was working for the daily newspaper Prothom Alo.
