= Farid Hossain =

Bangladeshi diplomat, journalist (born 1953)

- Born: April 3, 1953 (age 73); Bangladesh
- Education: University of Dhaka (BA, MA in English Literature)
- Occupations: Journalist, former Press Minister
- Years active: 1976–present
- Known for: Former bureau chief of Associated Press, Press Minister at Bangladesh High Commission, New Delhi

Farid Hossain (born 3 April 1953) is a Bangladeshi journalist, former Bangladesh bureau chief of the Associated Press, and former diplomat. He is known for his long international journalism career and tenure as Press Minister at the Bangladesh High Commission in New Delhi. He is a founding member of United News of Bangladesh.

== Early life and education ==
Hossain was born on 3 April 1953. He completed his bachelor's and master's in English literature at the University of Dhaka.

== Career ==
Hossain is a veteran of the Bangladesh Liberation War in 1971.

Hossain began his career in journalism in 1976. Over the years, he worked with multiple national and international media organizations, including serving as the Bangladesh bureau chief of the Associated Press. He also contributed to Time, Wion, and The Telegraph. He retired from the Associated Press in 2013. Julhas Alam replaced him as the Bangladesh bureau chief.

In 2016, Hossain was appointed the Press Minister at the Bangladesh High Commission, New Delhi. He had replaced Enamul Haque as the press secretary. In 2018, the government extended his term by two years. In October 2024, Hossain was made advisor editor of United News of Bangladesh, while Mahfuzur Rahman replaced him as editor of the United News of Bangladesh. Shaban Mahmood succeeded him as the Press Minister at the Bangladesh High Commission, New Delhi.

Hossain was actively involved in journalistic communities. He served as Senior Vice President of the Jatiya Press Club, President of the Overseas Correspondents Association of Bangladesh, and President of the Commonwealth Journalists Association's Bangladesh chapter.
