= MA Malek (journalist) =

Bangladeshi journalist

M. A. Malek
- এম. এ. মালেক
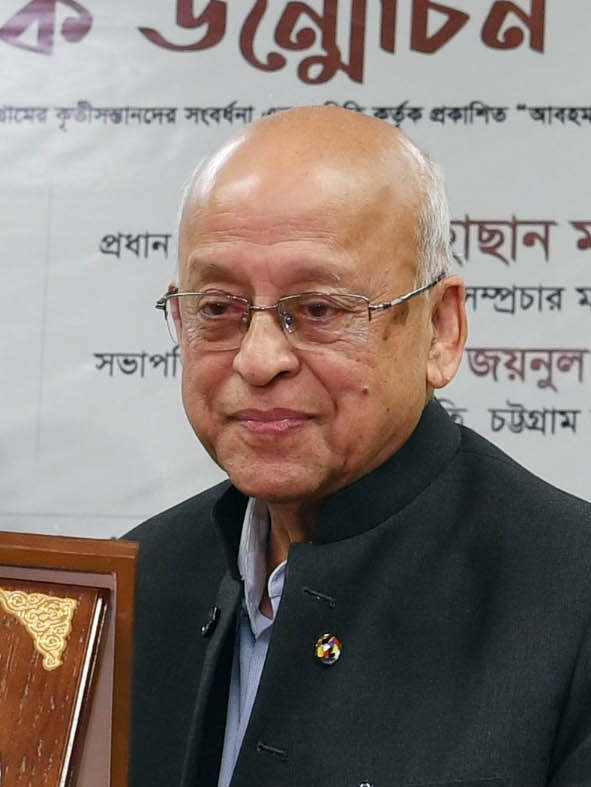
- Malek in 2022.
- Born: Mohammad Abdul Malek; 29 November 1940 (age 85); Chittagong
- Occupation: Journalist
- Years active: 1960–present
- Spouse: Kamrun Nahar
- Father: Abdul Khaleque
- Relatives: Mohammad Khaled (brother-in-law)
- Awards: Ekushey Padak

M. A. Malek (Bengali: এম. এ. মালেক) is a Bangladeshi journalist who is currently the editor of Dainik Azadi, the first newspaper to be published in independent Bangladesh. The Government of Bangladesh awarded him the Ekushey Padak in Journalism in 2022 for his significant contribution to journalism.

== Career ==
MA Malek has been a journalist since the publication of the Daily Azadi on September 5, 1960. He has been the editor of the daily Azadi since 2003. He is the former president of Chittagong Press Club, president of Chittagong Newspaper Council, Chittagong Editors Council, Chittagong Club and Chittagong Seniors Club.

The Government of Bangladesh awarded him the Ekushey Padak in Journalism in 2022 for his significant contribution in journalism.

== Award ==
- Ekushey Padak- 2022
