= AKM Shamim Chowdhury =

Bangladeshi journalists

Press Secretary to the Prime Minister
- In office 3 June 2014 – 14 June 2015
- Preceded by: Abul Kalam Azad
- Succeeded by: Ihsanul Karim

Personal details
- Education: Dhaka University
- Occupation: Journalist

AKM Shamim Chowdhury is a Bangladeshi journalist. He served as the press secretary to the Prime Minister of Bangladesh from 3 June 2014 to 14 June 2015.

Prior to his appointment in the Prime Minister's Office, Chowdhury served as the director general of the Department of Films and Publications, Press Institute of Bangladesh, Bangladesh Betar, Bangladesh Film Archive and National Institute of Mass Communication. He also served as principal information officer under the Press Information Department.

== Early life ==
Chowdhury was born in Narayanganj. He received his master's degree in political science from the University of Dhaka. He joined the government service under information cadre through Bangladesh Civil Service Examination in 1982.
