= Green Model Town =

Housing project in Dhaka

- Location within Bangladesh
- Coordinates: 23°43.7′N 90°27.1′E
- Country: Bangladesh
- Division: Dhaka Division
- District: Dhaka District
- Time zone: UTC+6 (Bangladesh Time)

Green Model Town is a private housing project straddling the boundary between Demra and Mugda Thana Khilgaon Thanas of Dhaka District, Bangladesh. Main entrance is Manda which is situated at Dhaka South City Corporation including ward 71,72,73. It is being developed by Amin Mohammad Lands Development Limited (AMLDL), a subsidiary of Amin Mohammad Group.

== History ==
In 2005, the housing project, among others, was subjected to allegations of illegal business practices and land grabbing. The project was one of the 77 housing development initiatives that the High Court declared illegal in June 2011. However, in 2012, it received approval from the Ministry of Housing and Public Works.

In September and July 2023, the company has been fined a total of ৳339,000 by the Dhaka South City Corporation for allowing mosquito larvae infestation to occur within the project area.

== Geography ==
Green Model Town is located at 23.7283°N 90.4518°E. It is bounded on the south by the Matuail landfill and waste treatment plant, and on the west by Manda Khal, a canal into which the landfill discharges its effluent. Houses built on pillars encroach on the canal area, and are even built in the middle of the canal. With no access by land, the latter are reachable only by boat.

== Recreation ==
An area adjacent to a wetland near Green Model Town experiences significant overcrowding by visitors on weekends, which locals have dubbed "Mini Cox's Bazar". The area has seen the emergence of children's play areas, mini amusement parks, fairs, and restaurants, with occasional kayaking facilities available on the wetland.

== Controversies ==
The housing project have faced allegations of fraud and environmental damage. The project was accused of filling in canals and reservoirs, occupying land illegally, and selling plots with fake documents. Despite residents' protests and a High Court order, RAJUK, the responsible organisation, has not taken any action against the project. The residents claim to have lost their land and are facing difficulties due to the project's activities. Developed illegally, leading to the destruction of wetlands, flood plains, cropland, and rural homesteads, the scheme was found to be in violation of the Private Housing Development Act 2004 and the conditions of the Detailed Area Plan.
