= Joynal Hazari =

Bangladeshi politician (1945–2021)

- জয়নাল হাজারী

Member of Parliament for Feni-2
- In office 10 July 1986 – 6 December 1987
- Preceded by: Position created
- In office 20 March 1991 – 30 March 1996
- Preceded by: Joynal Abedin
- In office 23 June 1996 – 15 July 2001
- Succeeded by: Joynal Abedin

Personal details
- Born: 24 August 1945
- Died: 27 December 2021 (aged 76) Dhaka, Bangladesh
- Party: Bangladesh Awami League

Joynal Abedin Hazari (24 August 1945 – 27 December 2021) was a Bangladeshi politician who was a member of the advisor Bangladesh Awami League and served as a member of Jatiya Sangsad, representing the Feni-2 constituency. He won election in 1986, 1991 and 1996.

== Early life ==
Joynal Abedin Hazari was born on 24 August 1945 to Goni Hazari. He was a student at Feni College when he got involved in politics in the late 1960s.

== Career ==
Hazari studied in Feni college where he entered politics. He served as the general secretary of the Feni district Awami League during 1984–2004. Dubbed the "Godfather of Feni", he was accused of torture, extortion and murder during the term he was in power. His relative Nizam Hazari is the current member of parliament from his old constituency.

Hazari formed a steering committee with members drawn from his close accomplices in 1993. He was first expelled from the party in April 2003 for creating chaos at a meeting in Feni in presence of the then party general secretary Abdul Jalil and also for working against the party-backed chairman candidate in the Sadar upazila election in the same year. He was expelled from Awami League on 2 May 2005 for his involvement in anti-organisational activities.

Hazari left the country for Kolkata, India on 16 Aug 2001 when the caretaker government came into power. He was sentenced to a total of 60 years' imprisonment in five cases in absentia. He returned to Bangladesh in February 2009, soon after the Awami League government took power in January. He surrendered to a Feni court on 15 April, and was imprisoned in Comilla jail. On 26 August the same year, among the total 23 cases, the High Court granted him bail in 11 cases and acquitted him of the remaining 12 cases. He was then freed from prison.

In 2012, Hazari met Prime Minister Sheikh Hasina at Ganabhaban and handed over a letter seeking permission to be active in politics. Eventually, in 2019, he returned to politics as an adviser to the central committee appointed by Hasina. In September 2019, Hasina donated Tk 4 million for his medical expenses.

== Charges and convictions ==
=== Murder cases ===
As of 2014, according to Feni police, around 44 cases – mostly for murder – had been filed against Hazari since the 1970s. He was first imprisoned in 1973 on charge of killing Nasir, a Chhatra Union leader. He was sentenced to three years of imprisonment in the Engineer Gias murder case.

In April 2009, Hazari was acquitted by Divisional Speedy Trial Tribunal (STT) of charges of killing four BNP activists at Sonagazi Upazila on 12 August 2001 and got bail from the court in the Sujan murder case.

=== Arms case ===
On 17 August 2001, a day after Hazari fled the country, Feni police raided his residence at Masterpara in Feni in his absence and recovered arms and ammunition including a rifle, two loaded revolvers, sub-machine gun magazine, 431 bullets, lethal weapons and contraband items including Viagra. The police filed a case against him and his private secretary Farooq Hossain Mridha in this connection. On 10 August 2003, the district and sessions judge in Feni convicted and sentenced both Hazari and Farooq to life imprisonment in the case. On 26 August 2009, the High Court acquitted him of the case.

=== Money laundering case ===
During the caretaker administration in 2007, the Anti-Corruption Commission (ACC) filed a case accusing Hazari of illegally acquiring wealth worth Tk 11.33 million, which was disproportionate to his known income sources. Hazari's sister, Khodeza Begum, was arrested at her residence in October 2007 for this case. On 27 November 2008, a Special Judge's Court of Dhaka sentenced him to 10 years' imprisonment on that case. His plea for bail on this case was rejected on 15 April 2009 and he was imprisoned in Comilla jail. On 18 July, he was granted bail on this case. On 5 December 2011, the High Court acquitted him of the charge following an appeal challenging the lower court verdict. And on 31 August 2015, the Supreme Court in turn cancelled the High Court verdict.

=== Journalist Tipu Sultan torture case ===
On 15 April 2009, Hazari got bail from the court in the journalist Tipu Sultan torture case.

=== Other cases ===
On 15 April 2009, Hazari got bail from an indoor stadium demolition case.

== Personal life and death ==
Hazari was never married. He died in Dhaka on 27 December 2021, at the age of 76. He had been suffering from heart, kidney, and lung diseases.

== Publications ==
Hazari owned a local news publication, Hazarika. He published an autobiography Joynal Hazari Bolchhi in February 2010 in an event in Dhaka inaugurated by the writer Abdul Gaffar Chowdhury.

== Bibliography ==
- Badhon Ache, Biju Kothay?
- Badhoner Bichar Chai
- Bijur Bichar Chai
- Joynal Hazari Bolchi
