= Kader Gani Chowdhury =

Bangladeshi journalist and editor

Managing Director and Chief Editor of Bangladesh Sangbad Sangstha
- Incumbent
- Assumed office 27 August 2026

Personal details
- Born: Fatikchhari Upazila, Chattogram District, Bangladesh
- Education: University of Dhaka
- Occupation: Journalist

Kader Gani Chowdhury (Bengali: কাদের গনি চৌধুরী) is a Bangladeshi journalist who has been serving as the managing director and chief editor of Bangladesh Sangbad Sangstha (BSS), the national news agency of Bangladesh, since August 2026. The government appointed him to the position on a contractual basis for one year under the Bangladesh Sangbad Sangstha Act, 2018, with his tenure taking effect from the date of his joining.

== Early life and education ==
Kader Gani Chowdhury is from Fatikchhari Upazila in Chattogram District. He completed his postgraduate degree in history at the University of Dhaka. During his student years, he served as joint general secretary of the Dhaka University Journalists Association.

== Career ==
Kader Gani began his journalism career in 1993 as a Dhaka University correspondent for the Bengali-language newspaper Dainik Dinkal. He later worked for Dainik Ittefaq and Amar Desh, and served as Deputy Managing Director of East West Media Group.

Gani has also held several positions in professional journalists' organizations. He served as President of the Dhaka Union of Journalists and Joint Secretary of the National Press Club. He was also Member Secretary of the Bangladesh Sammilito Peshajibi Parishad. In 2026, he was serving as Secretary General of the Bangladesh Federal Union of Journalists and as a member of the management committee of the National Press Club.

On 27 August 2026, the Ministry of Public Administration issued a gazette notification appointing Kader Gani as Managing Director and Chief Editor of Bangladesh Sangbad Sangstha (BSS) on a contractual basis for one year from the date of his joining. The appointment was made under Section 10(1) of the Bangladesh Sangbad Sangstha Act, 2018.

== Personal life ==
Gani Chowdhury was born in Fatikchhari Upazila in Chittagong District. He is the father of one daughter.
