= Ice Today =

Bangladeshi lifestyle magazine

ICE Today
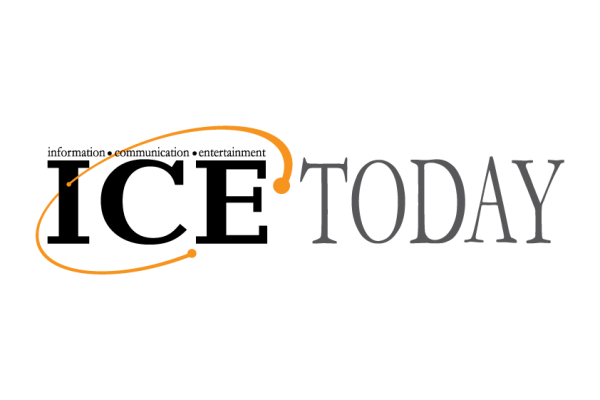
- Executive director: Nawshin Khair
- Former editors: Ziaul Karim
- Staff writers: Tawhidur Rashid, managing editor Tanuva Aumia Khundkar, associate editor Goutom Saha, fashion editor
- Categories: Entertainment and lifestyle
- Frequency: Monthly
- Publisher: Abul Khair Litu
- Founded: 2003; 22 years ago
- Company: ICE Media Limited
- Country: Bangladesh
- Based in: Dhaka, Bangladesh
- Language: English
- Website: www.icetoday.net

ICE Today is a Bangladeshi lifestyle magazine focusing on contemporary culture and society in the country. The magazine has sections dedicated to business, fashion, health, women, music, travel and cuisine.

== History and profile ==
ICE Today was started in 2003. It is published on a monthly basis. The magazine is under the ICE Media Ltd publishing umbrella, which produces ICE Business Times, Jamini, Charbela Chardik, and Bengal Barota. Its publisher is entrepreneur Abul Khair Litu, who has also published Shilpa O Shilpi about Bangladeshi art. Litu is an art enthusiast and active in the Bengal Gallery of Fine Arts.

The current staff is Nawshin Khair, executive director; Nobonita Chowdhury, managing editor; Syeda Samara Mortada, associate editor; and Goutom Saha, fashion editor.

The current editor replaced Ziaul Karim, who was appointed editor of the magazine in 2007. Karim, active in journalism since 1990, was a former reporter for The Morning Sun (newspaper) and The Daily Star (Bangladesh), and he was the former features editor for News Day. Karim was also appointed at the same time the editor of Jamini.

Several prominent literary names have been associated with the magazine. Author and poet Syed Shamsul Haque is chair of the editorial board. The Bengali poet Hayat Saif is a former managing editor.

== Editorial focus ==
The magazine says its title ICE stands for "information, communication and entertainment", and the magazine regularly covers "fashion, beauty, food ... travel, gadgets, events" and contains monthly interviews.

The magazine is a booster for Bangladeshi businesses, such as airlines and other national brands, through its content, awards and service. Its staff is also active in community service and the art scene.
