= Rashed Rouf =

Bangladeshi novelist, editor and journalist

- রাশেদ রউফ
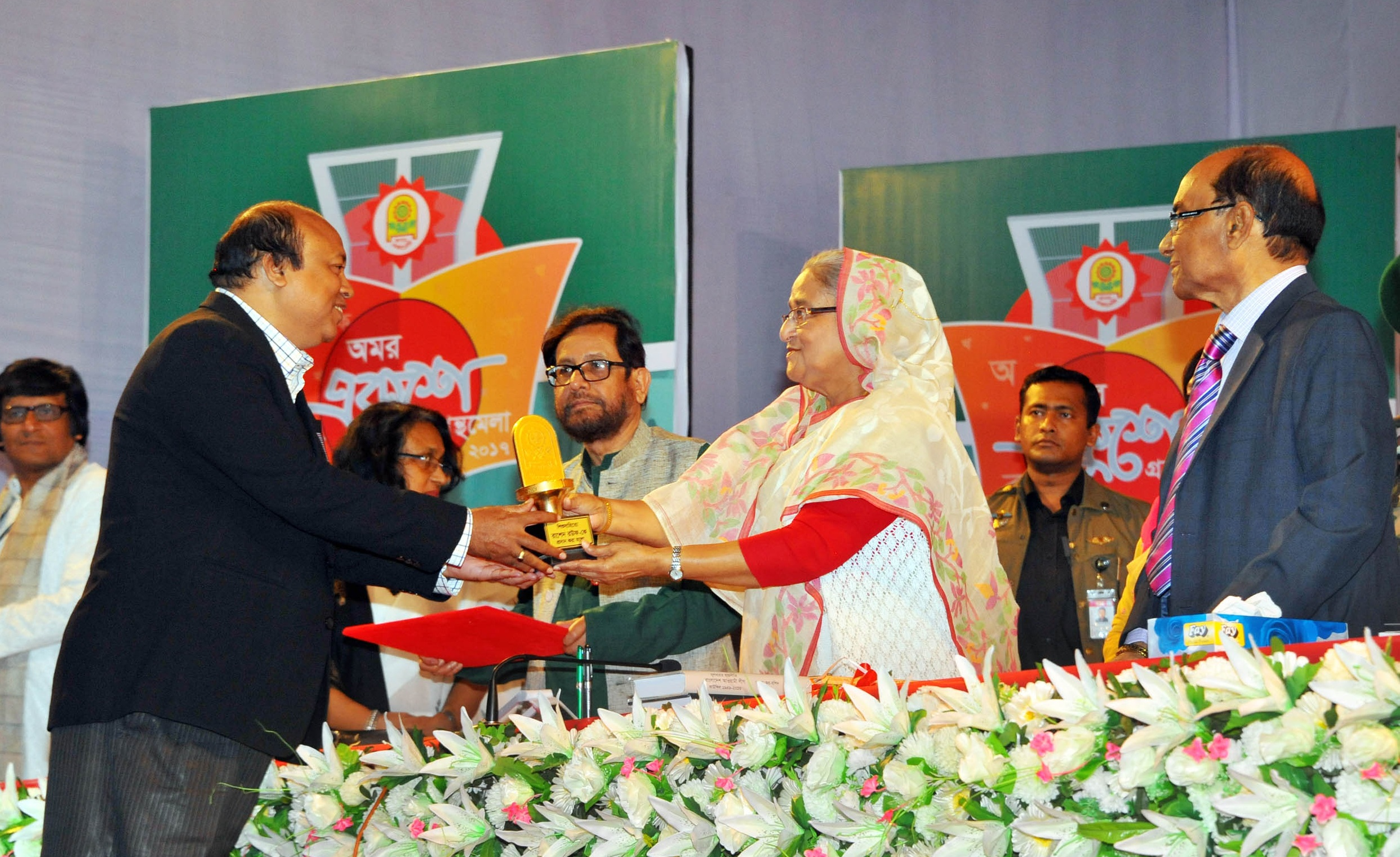
- Rouf receiving an award from Sheikh Hasina (2017)
- Born: 1 January 1964 (age 62); Chittagong District, East Pakistan, Pakistan
- Education: BSc (mathematics)
- Alma mater: University of Chittagong
- Occupations: journalist, writer, editor
- Awards: Bangla Academy Literary Award (2017)

Rashed Rouf (born January 1, 1964) is a Bangladeshi novelist, editor and journalist. He was awarded the Bangla Academy Literary Award in 2017. As of 2019, Rouf is an associate editor of Dainik Azadi, a Bengali-language daily newspaper.

== Early life ==
Rashed Rouf was born at Patiya in Chittagong in 1964. His father was Noor Syed. His mother is Mabeya Begum. He spent his childhood in his native village, Chonhora in Patiya. Rouf is the eldest of eleven children with six brothers and four sisters.

== Education ==
Rashed Rouf's education started at Chonhora Primary School in Patiya. Then he studied at Chonhora Shoroshy Bala High School, Patiya Government College and then at Chittagong University. In 1986, he completed his graduation in mathematics from the University of Chittagong and in 1987 completed his post-graduate.

== Career ==
After completing his education, he chose journalism as a profession. In 1991, he joined the Dainik Azadi, one of the oldest newspapers in Bangladesh, as a sub editor. As of 2019, he is an associate editor there.

== Literary works ==
He started writing when he was in school. While studying in class six, he inspired by a classmate's poetry practice. Later, his beloved teacher Asha Kiran Chowdhury's inspiration boost his uninterrupted journey of writing. however, his first poem published in newspaper in 1980, when he was a student of Higher secondary.

So far, half a dozen books have been published by Rashed Rouf.

=== Teenage poetry ===
- Akasher Seemanay Surzer thikana (1991)
- Agol Vanga Pagol Haowa (1996),
- Bikel mane Chuti (1996),
- Dhaner gaane praner banshi (1998),
- Jaoar pothe haowar raile (1999),
- Sadhinotar Priyo Kobita (2000)
- Chutir Moja kemon Moja (2000)
- Ayre Kjokon Ghore Ai (2002)
- Nirbachito Kishor Kobita (2008)
- Chobir Moto Desh (2008)
- Anondo Sampan (2009)
- Porir Nupur (2012)
- Bhasha Andolon Mukthijoddo-Sadhinota o Desher Kobita (2014)
- Tumer Jonno Soanr Bangla (2016)
- Ki Shuva Ki Chaya Go (2017)

=== Articles and research books ===
- Chondo Porichoy (1996)
- Chora Jadukor Sukumar Barua (1999)
- Chora Shilpi Lutfur Rahman Riton (2000)
- Bangladesher Chora : Rup o Rupukar
- Robindra Nath : Chotoder Apon (2012)
- Aloi Bhuban Vora (2016)
- Amader Shishu Sahitto : Chondomoy Sonali Rekha (2016)

=== Biography ===
- Mohammad Khaled (2016)

=== Poetry ===
- Tumar Jonno Sokal Amar Tumar Jonno Rat (1997)
- Eso Ponchashe Eso Mon Chashe (2013)

=== Rhyme books ===
- Somokaleen Chora (1997)
- Ontomilsomogro : 1 (2016)
