= Enayetullah Khan =

Bangladeshi Entrepreneur and Journalist

- Born: 1953 (age 72–73); Dhaka, Bangladesh
- Citizenship: Bangladeshi
- Education: Masters
- Alma mater: University of Dhaka
- Occupations: Journalism, Business
- Organization(s): Cosmos Group, Dhaka Courier and United News of Bangladesh
- Known for: Journalist, businessman
- Website: www.enayetullahkhan.com

Enayetullah Khan (born 1953) is a Bangladeshi entrepreneur, author, journalist and patron of the arts. He is best known as the founder and managing director of the Cosmos Group, a Bangladeshi conglomerate incorporating over a dozen companies operating at home and abroad. He is the founder of Dhaka Courier and United News of Bangladesh.

== Early life ==
Khan was born in 1953 in Dhaka, Bangladesh. He is son of M Masud Khan and Shamsun Nahar Khan. His grandfather Amanat Khan was a prominent member of Chittagong society.

== Education ==
After completing his master's degree in mass communication and journalism (MCJ) from the University of Dhaka in 1975, Khan taught briefly at the MCJ department before leaving to start his career as a media entrepreneur.

== Career ==
While still a student, Khan rose to prominence as a news commentator on Radio Bangladesh and as an English newscaster on BTV. As part of a generation of media entrepreneurs, Khan in the 1988s established the United News of Bangladesh (UNB), the first fully digitized wire service in South Asia and is the founding editor of the Dhaka Courier, an independent newsweekly.

== Author ==
Apart from his entrepreneurial career, he is passionate about promoting and preserving Bangladesh's history and heritage. He is also involved in environmentalism centering the Royal Bengal Tiger and is an avid promoter of art and music, for “their capacity to transcend barriers and borders”. These passions have most frequently found expression in the form of books he has either authored or co-authored.

== Published books ==
- Khan, Enayetullah; Alam, Shahidul; Ahmed, Noazesh (2001). Bangladesh: Splendours of the Past. Dhaka: Cosmos Print and Publications. OCLC 48517851.
- —— (2011). The Bangladesh Sundarbans. Dhaka: Wildlife Trust of Bangladesh. ISBN 978-984-33-3829-7.
- ——; Marre, Yves (2014). Boats: A Treasure of Bangladesh. Dhaka: Cosmos Books. ISBN 978-984-33-8353-2.
