= Dainik Azadi =

Daily newspaper published in Bangladesh

Daily Azadi
- 10-09-2023 cover of Dainik Azadi.
- Type: Daily newspaper
- Format: Print, online
- Founder: Mohammed Abdul Khalek
- Editor-in-chief: MA Malek (journalist)
- Associate editor: Rashed Rouf
- Founded: August 5, 1960; 66 years ago
- Political alignment: Liberal; Secular
- Language: Bengali
- Country: Bangladesh
- Website: dainikazadi.net

Daily Azadi (Bengali: দৈনিক আজাদী) is a Bangladeshi newspaper published in Bangladesh.

== History ==
The Azadi was first published on 5 September 1960. The paper was pro-democracy and supported various autonomy movements in East Pakistan. It was blacklisted by the Pakistani Government for a year and banned from receiving government advertisement. It stopped publishing for three months during the Bangladesh Liberation War.

Abdul Khaleq was the founding editor and publisher of Azadi. At first, the price of the magazine was two annas (12 paise). After Khaleq's death, his son-in-law Md. Mohammad Khaled took over as editor in 1962. MA Malek has been in charge of the newspaper since 2003 after his death.

== See also ==
- List of newspapers in Bangladesh
- Bengali-language newspapers
- Ajker Patrika
- Bhorer Kagoj
- Bangla Tribune
- Banglanews24.com
- Samakal
- United News of Bangladesh
