= 2024 Dhaka Bailey Road fire =

Fire in shopping mall in Bailey Road, Dhaka

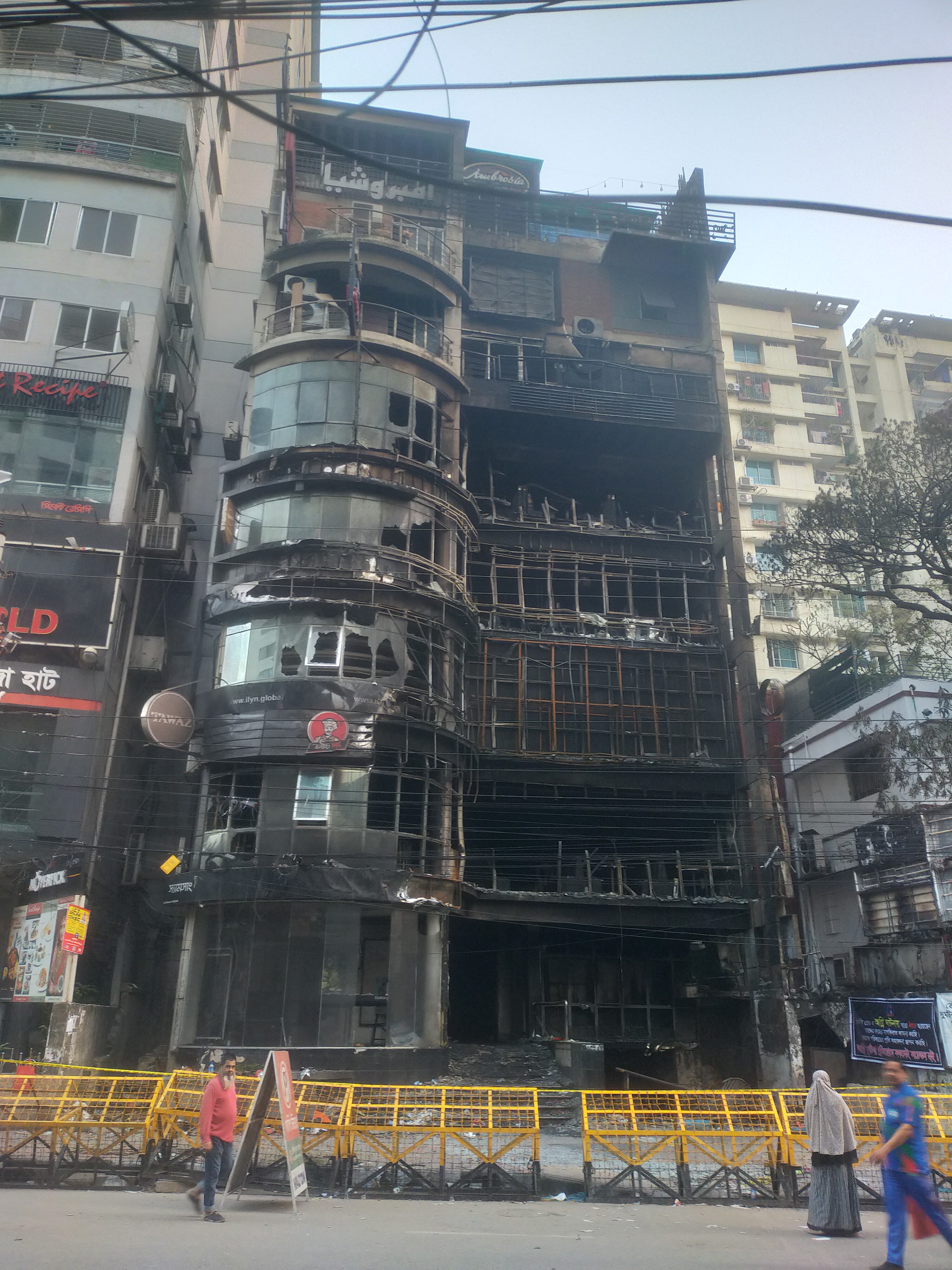
- The burnt out plaza one day after the incident
- Location of the Green Cozy Cottage Shopping Mall
- Date: 29 February 2024
- Time: 21:50 BST
- Duration: 2 hours
- Location: Green Cozy Cottage Shopping Mall, Dhaka, Bangladesh; 23.7420°N 90.4102°E
- Also known as: Bailey Road Fire
- Type: Structure fire
- Deaths: 46
- Injuries: 75

On the night of 29 February 2024, a fire broke out in a seven-storey shopping mall located in the New Bailey Road of Dhaka, Bangladesh, killing 46 people.

== Background ==
Fires in Bangladesh are a common occurrence, with a dense population and new buildings which at times lack safety measures, causing many fires and explosions due to faulty gas cylinders, electrical wiring and air conditioners. A fire at a food processing plant in 2021 killed 54 people, at least 70 were killed in another fire in 2019, and a garment factory fire killed at least 117 people in 2012.

== Fire ==
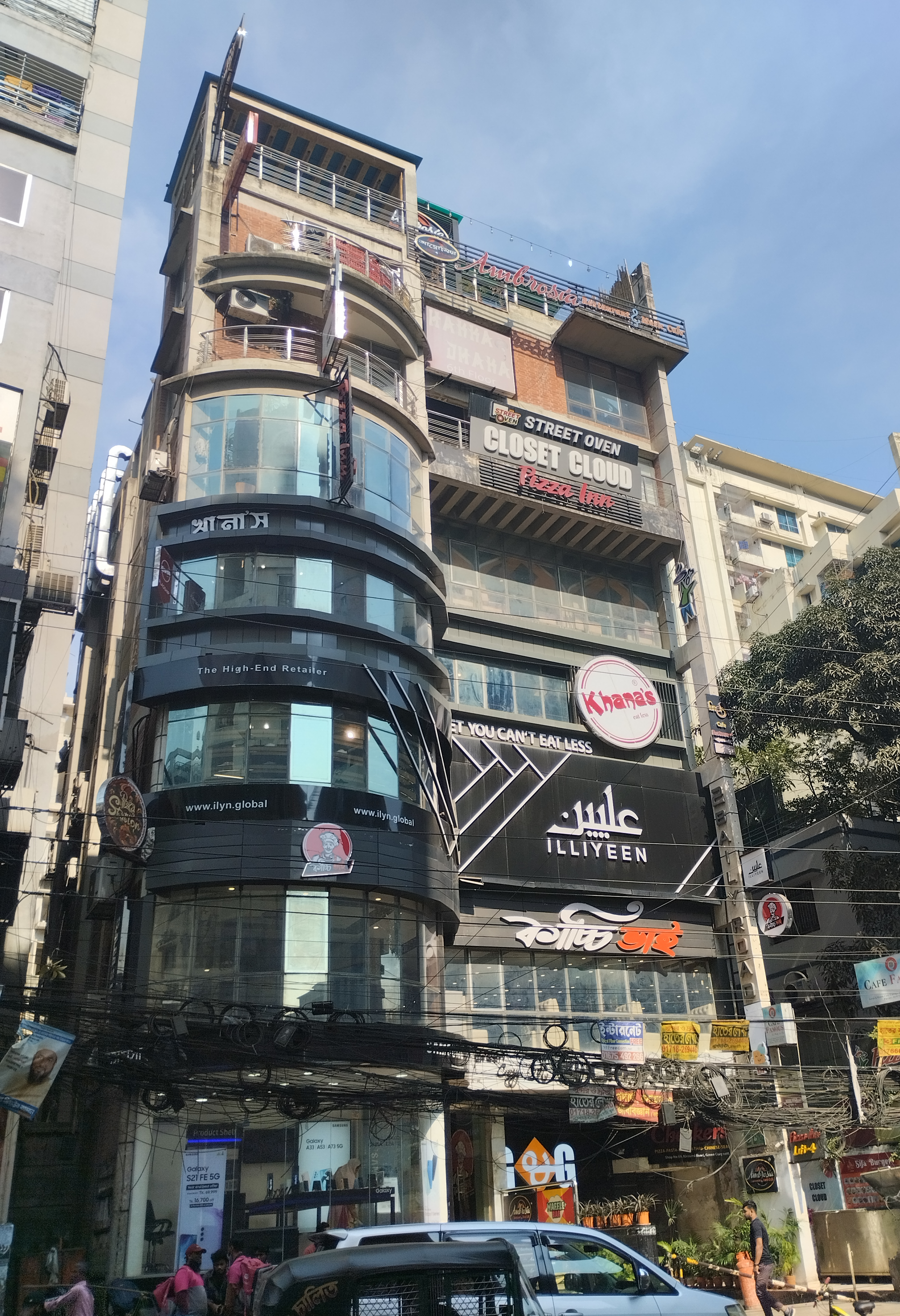
The Green Cozy Cottage Shopping Mall in December 2022

The fire started at 21:50 BST in the Kacchi Bhai biryani restaurant on the first floor of the Green Cozy Cottage Shopping Mall on Bailey Road and quickly spread to other floors, trapping dozens inside. The building mainly contained restaurants, along with some clothing and mobile phone shops. Fire officials said a gas leak or a problem with a stove could have caused the blaze. They stated that the fire spread rapidly due to the presence of gas cylinders in the kitchens of multiple restaurants in the building. Evacuation was also hindered due to smoke in the building's staircase.

A survivor recounted that he had entered a kitchen and broke a window to evacuate the building. A cashier and server he worked with had attempted to urge customers to leave. The fire killed the cashier and server.

Thirteen firefighting units were deployed to the site. Firefighters rescued 75 people from the building and used a crane to evacuate people from the upper level of the charred structure. The blaze was brought under control after two hours.

== Casualties ==
At least 46 people were killed, at least 75 others were injured, and 42 were found unconscious. At least 22 people were treated for burns and described as in critical condition. Fire officials have stated that many of the deceased were due to injuries sustained in attempting to evacuate by jumping from the building, burns or suffocation.

Thirty-three bodies were brought to the Dhaka Medical College Hospital, ten to the Sheikh Hasina National Institute of Burn and Plastic Surgery, and one person died at the police hospital. At least 41 bodies have been identified, while 38 have been claimed by relatives.

== Investigation ==
The government ordered an inquiry into the incident. It was later found that the Green Cozy Cottage was constructed by Amin Mohammad Group and managed by Amin Mohammad Property Management Services Limited; therefore Amin Mohammad Group has been responsible for the building's security, safety measures, personnel for guarding, and lifts. However Amin Mohammad Group claimed themselves only a developer of the building. After the tragic incident Mohammad Tanvirul Islam, executive director of Amin Mohammad Group, left Bangladesh to avoid any possible legal proceedings. A Rajuk source revealed that the building was approved for commercial offices up to the fifth floor, with the sixth and seventh floors designated for residential use. However, Md Ramzanul Haque Nihad, managing director of Amin Mohammad Group, purchased the seventh floor and rented it to a Chinese restaurant named Hakka Dhaka. Further investigation found that the building had multiple “voids” spaces designed for light and air circulation whiche were closed to expand usable space inside the building.

Police filed a case against Amin Mohammad Group, Anwarul Haque, owner of 'Chumuk' fast food (where the fire originated), Munshi Hamimul Alam Bipul, the manager of the building, and 'Kacchi Bhai' owner Sohel Siraj with causing deaths by attempted murder in addition to their negligence. Eight members of the Amin Mohammad Group along with four others associated with the restaurants in that building were detained after the incident as per the sources of Dhaka Metropolitan Police. Later Kacchi Bhai owner Shoel SIraj was placed on two-day remand. Though exact cause of the fire is still under investigation, but officials suspect that the fire started after the explosion of a gas cylinder in the restaurant. Gas cylinders were reported to be on every floor of the building, as well as on staircases. The building did not have a fire exit.

In April 2026, two years after the incident, an investigation revealed that the restaurant allegedly locked its exits during the fire to prevent customers from leaving without paying the bills. The probe also found that blocked stairways and obstructed emergency exits significantly increased the death toll. Around 22 people were charged, including owners and managers.

== Response ==
Prime Minister Sheikh Hasina expressed shock and sorrow over the disaster and ordered officials to provide swift treatment for the injured. Mirza Fakhrul Islam Alamgir, the secretary general for the opposition Bangladesh Nationalist Party, blamed the government for the fire, claiming that it had occurred due to the lack of "rule of law" and the government's lack of accountability.

== See also ==
- List of fires in high-rise buildings
- Rana Plaza collapse—2013 building collapse in Dhaka that killed 1,134 people
