= Joynal Abedin =

Bangladeshi politician

Member of Parliament for Feni-2
- In office 2001–2014
- Preceded by: Joynal Hazari
- Succeeded by: Nizam Hazari

Personal details
- Born: Feni, Bangladesh
- Party: Bangladesh Nationalist Party

Joynal Abedin (also known as V.P. Joynal) is a Bangladesh Nationalist Party politician and former Jatiya Sangsad member from the Feni-2 constituency. He is currently advisor to the Chairperson of BNP and the Member of Parliament from Feni-2 constituency. He was elected in 1988, 2001, 2008 and 2026.
