= Rafiqul Haque =

Bangladeshi journalist and poet (1937–2021)

- রফিকুল হক
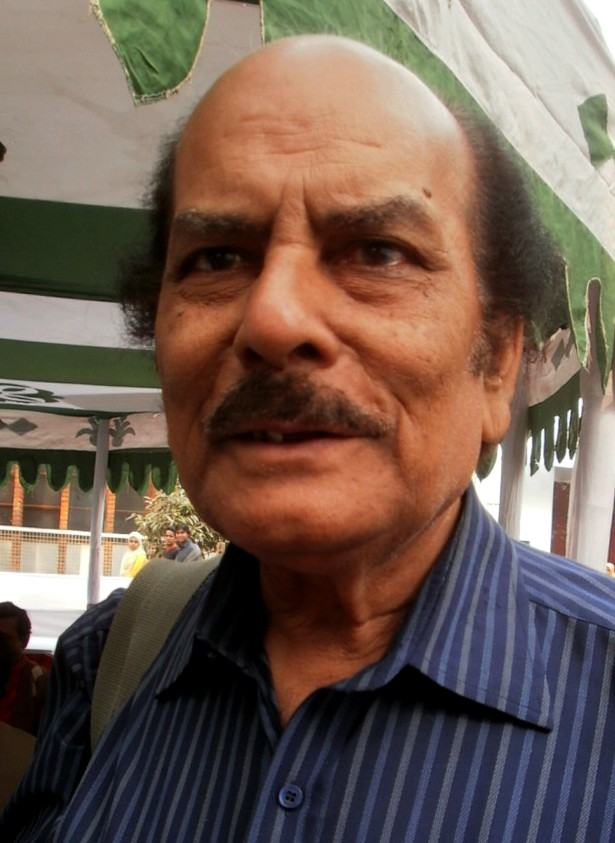
- Haque in 2013
- Born: 8 January 1937
- Died: 10 October 2021 (aged 84)
- Occupations: Journalist, poet

Rafiqul Haque (known as Dadu Bhai; 8 January 1937 – 10 October 2021) was a Bangladeshi journalist and poet. He worked for the Daily Jugantor, published in Dhaka, as its feature editor. Earlier in his career, he was the executive editor of the Dainik Rupali, Dainik Janata and also worked for Dainik Azad, Dainik Lal Sabuj and The Bangladesh Observer. Haque was reputed for his rhymes.

Haque was the acting editor of the Kishore Bangla from 1976 to 1983, the only weekly newspaper for children ever published in the Indian sub-continent.

Haque received many awards, including the Bangla Academy Award, Bangladesh Children's Academy Award, Agrani Bank Children's Literature Award, Chandrabati Academy Award, and All India Children's Literature Award.

He died in 2021.
