= Abul Kalam Azad (journalist) =

Bangladeshi journalist

MD and Chief Editor of Bangladesh Sangbad Sangstha
- In office 3 February 2014 – 5 August 2024

Press Secretary to the Prime Minister
- In office 2009 – 27 January 2014
- Preceded by: Syed Fahim Munaim
- Succeeded by: AKM Shamim Chowdhury

Personal details
- Education: Dhaka University
- Occupation: journalist

Abul Kalam Azad is a Bangladeshi journalist and former Managing Director and Chief Editor of Bangladesh Sangbad Sangstha (BSS), state-run national news agency of Bangladesh. Prior to his appointment at BSS, Azad worked as the Press Secretary to the Prime Minister of Bangladesh.

== Early life ==
Azad was born in Haridia village at Lohajang Upazila in Munshiganj District. His father's name is Habibur Rahman Sikder. After graduating from Dhaka University, he received a diploma in 'advanced journalism' from Moscow. While studying at Dhaka University, he was a member of the central committee of Bangladesh Chhatra League. During the 1969 Mass uprising in East Pakistan, he was Dhaka divisional treasurer of the Sarbadaliya Chhatra Sangram Parishad.
