= Faizul Latif Chowdhury =

Bangladeshi diplomat and writer (born 1959)

- ফয়জুল লতিফ চৌধুরী
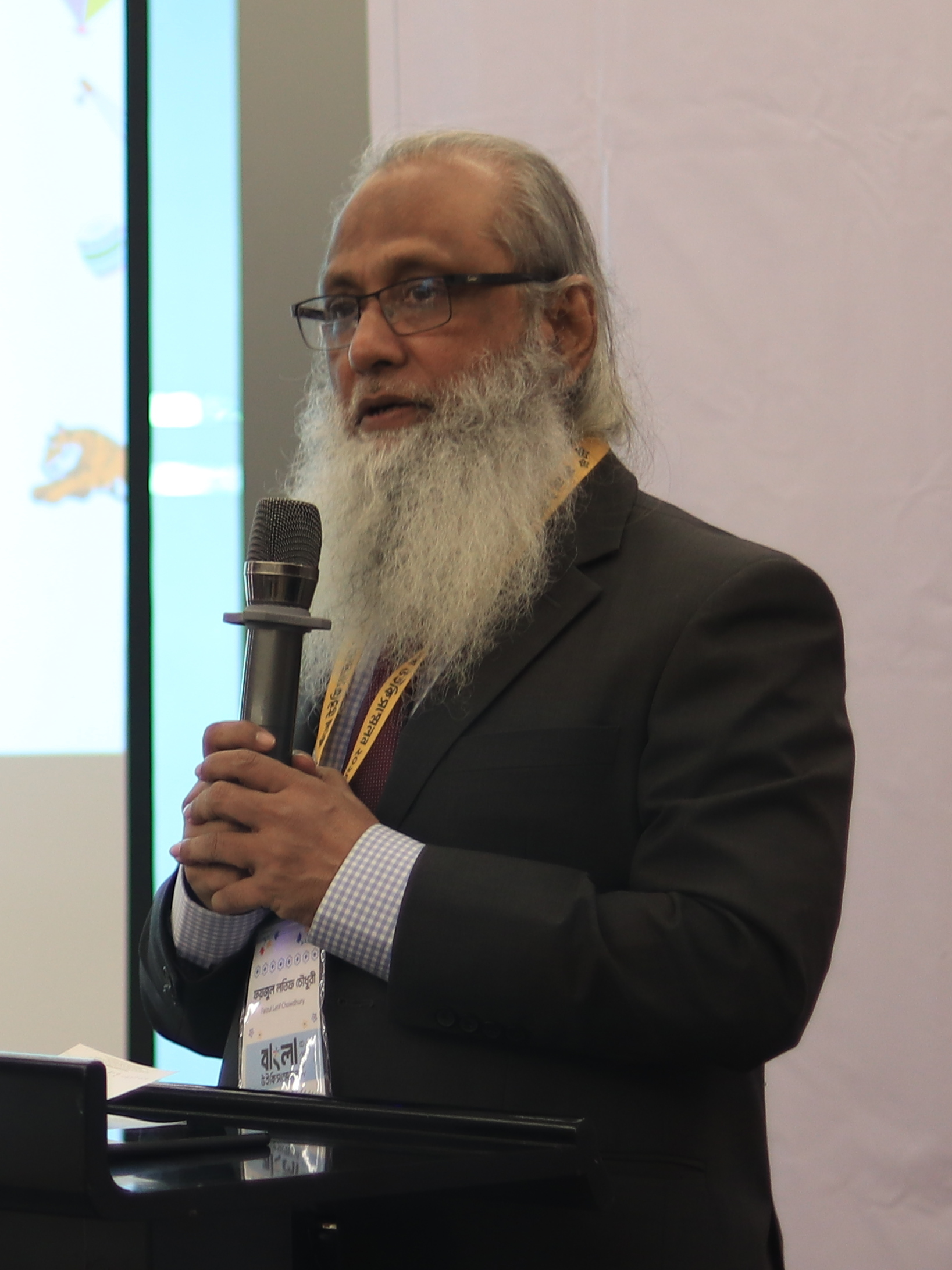
- Chowdhury in 2024
- Born: Faizul Latif Chowdhury; 3 June 1959 (age 67); Mymensingh
- Education: Post-graduate
- Alma mater: University of Dhaka; Monash University; London School of Economics and Political Science; Deakin University
- Occupations: Diplomat, economist, writer, teacher
- Writing career
- Language: Bengali
- Subjects: Economics, political science, revenue administration, literature
- Notable work: Corruption in Bureaucracy

Faizul Latif Chowdhury (Bengali: ফয়জুল লতিফ চৌধুরী, romanized: Phoyjul Lotiph Cōudhuri, pronounced [fɔedʒul lotif tʃoudʱuɾi]; born 3 June 1959) is a civil servant from Bangladesh. He served as the director general of Bangladesh National Museum. Chowdhury has written on a variety of academic topics, including corruption in public administration, tax policy, economics of tax evasion and tax avoidance, smuggling, and international trade policy. He is also a translator of Bengali poetry, and has researched the modern poet Jibanananda Das. Currently he works at Independent University Bangladesh as adjunct professor business.

== Education and training ==
Chowdhury studied science at the high school and pre-university college in Mymensingh, Bangladesh. He went to Mymensingh Zilla School for SSC and Ananda Mohan College for HSC. Later he studied Economics at the University of Dhaka for his Bachelor of Social Science and Master of Social Science degrees. He studied public policy at the Deakin University, Australia. Later, in 1992, he obtained his MBA from the Monash University. Professor Owen Hughes was his thesis supervisor. Finally he studied public administration and public policy at the Department of Government at the London School of Economics and Political Science (LSE). At the LSE, Professor Keith Dowding was his dissertation supervisor. At different times he received training on information technology.

== Career ==
Chowdhury's professional career started in freelance journalism in the Kishore Bangla, a juvenile weekly published from Dhaka. However, his literary career commenced when he started to write for the Bangladesh Observer and the daily Purbadesh in his school days, since 1973. In 1974, for a brief period, he edited the children's page of Banglar Darpan, a Bengali weekly published from Mymensingh since 1972. Later he worked for a while (1978–80) for the weekly Kishore Bangla, a juvenile magazine published from Dhaka. Then he worked as the Feature Editor in the Saptahik Chitrabangla (1981–83). Just after finishing education at the Dhaka University, Chowdhury briefly worked at the Planning Division of the Rupali Bank as a senior officer.

Towards the end of 1983, he joined the Bangladesh Civil Service as a fast-track career civil servant. He worked at the National Board of Revenue and its attached offices for a long time in different capacities (1983–2000) until he was appointed as a deputy secretary to the Government of Bangladesh in 2001. He was promoted as joint secretary to the government in 2005.

Meanwhile, he also worked as a national consultant in two projects, one funded by the World Bank and the other by Norway. He also worked in the Prime Minister's Office as director in charge of the Ministries of Finance, Planning, ERD, IMED, Statistics and IRD. In 2003, he was appointed by the government as a diplomat for four years. In 2008, National Board of Revenue of Bangladesh appointed him as research and statistics expert on its Modernization and Automation Project. At present he working as the director general of Bangladesh National Museum. Between 2009 and 2014 he worked as director and chief operating officer of GeneSys Technology Group. For a brief period he worked as COO of the Prothom Alo during 2009-2010 period. Since 2010 he has been an adjunct professor at the Independent University Bangladesh.

Chowdhury involved himself with many publications and publishing houses. He engineered establishment of two publishing houses, namely Adhuna Prokashony and Desh Prokashan. He played a vital role in the publication of a monthly literary magazine titled Dwitiyo Chinta (tr. Second Thought), published from Mymensingh town and edited by Iffat Ara since 1985. He also conceived and organized publication of monthly Adhuna (1985–1987), a top-rate literary magazine edited by poet Shamsur Rahman. He worked as the Literary editor of the daily Banglabazaar Patrika for a brief period (1992–93).

== Literary works ==
=== Poet Jibanananda Das ===
Chowdhury has worked extensively on life and works of Bengal's most popular modern poet Jibanananda Das. He has published a number of titles on his poetry. He has translated a number of Jibanananda poems into English, reviewed a number of poems, and written articles on the literary works and style of the poet. He has collected and published all the non-fictional prose works of poet Jibanananda Das. He considers Jibanananda Das as a poet with all signs of post-modern poetry. His latest work on the poet, titled Essays on Jibanananda Das was published in 2009. In 2015 he collected and published 101 letters of poet Jibanananda Das in a volume.

=== Translation ===
Chowdhury has translated a number of major Bengali poets into English. His Poems from Jibanananda Das published in 1995 collects poems of Bengal's most important modernist poet Jibanananda Das. He published Beyond Land and Time, a collection of one hundred poems of Jibanananda Das in English translation. He edited Voice of Hayat Saif, a compilation of poems of 1960s Bengali poet Hayat Saif translated into English. He has also translated fiction of Maltese fictionist Oliver Friggieri and, Booker awardee Arundhati Roy of India, among others.

== Economic works ==
Chowdhury has dealt several aspects of applied economics. His works include revenue administration, economics of tax evasion, design of value added tax, economics of smuggling, rent-seeking by public servants, economics of corruption, tax administration and tax evasion, tax farming and making of budgetary policy, among others.

== Publications ==
=== Literary ===
- Chotoder, Boroder (Collection of Bengali rhymes) (ed.), 1990: Shilpataru, Dhaka.
- Stories of Nadine Gordimer (translated) (ed. with Introduction), 1992: Dibya Prokash, Dhaka.
- Jibanananda Daser "Aat Bochor Ager Ek Deen (literary criticism) (ed.), 1994: Dibya Prokash, Dhaka.
- Jibanananda Daser "Godhuli Sandhir Nritya" (literary criticism) (ed.), 1995: Dibya Prokash, Dhaka.
- Poems from Jibanananda Das (ed. Tr.), 1995: Creative Workshop, Chittagong.
- Amiyo Chakrabartyr Sreshtha Prabandha (Anthology of Essays) (ed.). 1998: Mawla Brothers, Dhaka
- Oliver Friggeirie's Koranta and Other Short Stories from Malta (translated) (ed), Desh Prokason, 1998: Dhaka.
- Arundhati Roy's "Avilash Talkies" (Translated with Introduction), 1999: Dibya Prokash, Dhaka
- Jibanananda Bibechona (Anthology of essays on poet Jibanananda Das with Introduction) (ed.), 1999: Anya Prokash, Dhaka.
- Homosexual References in Bengali Literature, 1999: Jijnasa, Calcutta.
- Voice of Hayat Saif, (ed. Tr.), 1999: Desh Prokashan, Dhaka
- Jibanananda Daser "Mrityur Aage" (literary criticism) (ed.), 2000: Dibya Prokash, Dhaka.
- Oprakashito Jibanananda 51 (Poetry anthology) (ed.), 2000 : Mawla Brothers, Dhaka
- Jibanananda Daser Prabandha Samagra (Anthology of Essays) (ed.), 2000: 2nd edition, Mawla Brothers, Dhaka.
- Shilpa Shahitye Nagnata Jounata Oshlilata (Anthology of Essays with Introduction) (ed.), 2000 : Dibya Prokash, Dhaka
- Jibanananda Daser Agranthitha Prabandhabali (Anthology of uncompiled essays by poet Jibanananda das) (ed.), 2000: Mawla Brothers, Dhaka.
- Prasanga : Jibanananda (Literary essays on poet Jibanananda Das), 2000: Somoy Prokashon, Dhaka.
- Bengali Essays of Nirad C. Chowdhury (Anthology of Essays with Introduction) (ed.), 2000 : Somoy Prokashon, Dhaka.
- Jibanananda – Tulonay, Shomporkey (Anthology of comparative essays on poet Jibanananda Das with Introduction) (ed.), 2000 : Somoy Prokashon, Dhaka.
- Beyond Land and Time, 2007, Pathak Samabesh, Dhaka.
- Essays on Jibanananda Das, 2009, Pathak Samabesh, Dhaka.

=== Social science ===
- Chowdhury, F. L. (1992) Evasion of Customs Duty in Bangladesh, unpublished MBA dissertation submitted to Monash University, Australia
- Chowdhury, F. L. (1994) 'An Estimate of under-invoicing in relation to Bangladesh's import from seven Asian partner countries', Fiscal Frontier, Dhaka
- Chowdhury, F. L. (1995) 'Need for upgrading fiscal reforms for small and medium enterprises in Bangladesh', Keynote paper presented in a seminar organized by Dhaka Chamber of Commerce & Industry (DCCI), Dhaka, Bangladesh
- Chowdhury, F. L. (1999) A production-substitution model of Smuggling, Keynote paper presented in a seminar organized by the National Board of Revenue, Dhaka, Bangladesh
- Chowdhury, F. L. (2006) Corrupt bureaucracy and privatization of Customs in Bangladesh, Pathok Samabesh, Dhaka.
