= Syed Nuruddin Munaim =

Bangladeshi writer

Syed Nuruddin Munaim is a Bangladeshi writer.

== Career ==
In 1980, Munaim was the Press Counsellor at the Embassy of Bangladesh in Washington DC.

Munaim was awarded the Ekushey Padak, the second highest civilian award in Bangladesh, in 1983 for his contribution to journalism in Bangladesh.

== Personal life ==
Munaim's son, Syed Fahim Munaim, was a notable journalist in Bangladesh.
