= Daily Naya Diganta =

Bangladeshi daily newspaper

Daily Naya Diganta; দৈনিক নয়া দিগন্ত

- 10 September 2023 cover of Daily Naya Diganta.
- Type: Daily newspaper
- Format: Broadsheet
- Owner: Diganta Media Corporation
- Publisher: Shamsul Huda
- Editor: Alamgir Mohiuddin
- Founded: 2004
- Language: Bengali
- Headquarters: 1 RK Mission Road Manik Mia Foundation, Motijheel, Dhaka-1203, Bangladesh
- OCLC number: 868012647
- Website: dailynayadiganta.com

The Daily Naya Diganta (lit. 'Daily New Horizons') is a Bengali daily newspaper published in Bangladesh since 2004.

== History ==
It is part of Diganta Media Corporation, which was owned by Mir Quasem Ali, politician of the Jamaat-e-Islami. The television channel, Diganta TV, is a sister concern of the newspaper. The television was launched in August 2008. Alamgir Mohiuddin is the editor of Naya Diganta.

A Daily Naya Diganta reporter was cautioned for misrepresenting a statement of prosecution witness in the International Crimes Tribunal in January 2012. On 17 June 2012, the chairman of the holding company, Mir Quasem Ali, was arrested by Rapid Action Battalion on charges of war crimes during the 1971 war. He was convicted and sentenced to death by the International Crimes Tribunal. Bangladesh Information Minister Hasanul Haq Inu accused the newspaper of carrying out "propaganda" against the International Crimes Tribunal.

In 2018, Dhaka high court indicated the editor of Naya Diganta for libel regarding the case of defaming Muhammad and another case was filled for defaming Sheikh Mujibur Rahman against Naya Diganta editor. Dhaka Union of Journalists (DUJ) expelled its units at The Daily Sangram, Naya Diganta, Weekly Sonar Bangla and Diganta Television as those media houses are run by Jamaat-e-Islami and Islami Chhatra Shibir.

== Supplements ==
- Fun Magazine: Therapy, Editor: Ahmed Shahabuddin.
- Social Magazine: Abokash, Editor: Maksuda Sultana.
- Lifestyle Magazine: Satrong, Editor: Sabira Sultana
- Monthly Magazine: Onno Ek Diganta, Editor: Alfaz Anam

== See also ==
- List of newspapers in Bangladesh
- Bengali-language newspapers
