= DBC News =

- Country: Bangladesh
- Broadcast area: Nationwide
- Headquarters: Mohakhali, Dhaka

Programming
- Language: Bengali
- Picture format: 1080i HDTV (downscaled to 16:9 576i for SDTV sets)

Ownership
- Owner: Dhaka Bangla Media & Communication Ltd.

History
- Launched: 21 September 2016; 10 years ago

Links
- Website: dbcnews.tv

DBC News (Bengali: ডিবিসি নিউজ), derived from "Dhaka Bangla", is a Bangladeshi Bengali-language satellite and cable news television channel, owned and operated by Dhaka Bangla Media & Communication Ltd. The founder of the channel was Iqbal Sobhan Chowdhury. DBC News is headquartered in the Mohakhali neighbourhood of Dhaka.

== History ==
In 2013, the Bangladesh Telecommunication Regulatory Commission granted Iqbal Sobhan Chowdhury's Dhaka Bangla Media & Communication a license to broadcast "Dhaka-Bangla Television". It later received its frequency allocation in January 2015. The channel was launched as DBC News on 21 September 2016, beginning with the ten o'clock morning news bulletin. The launch ceremony was attended by then Commerce Minister Tofail Ahmed and then Information Minister Hasanul Haq Inu. In December 2019, DBC News, along with three other Bangladeshi television channels, signed an agreement with UNICEF to air programming regarding children's issues.

=== Censorship and violence ===
On 27 October 2017, a motorcade of former Prime Minister Khaleda Zia was attacked in Feni District. The news van of DBC and other news organizations were damaged in the attack. DBC News correspondent Partho Hasan was attacked by Shirhan Sharif Tomal, Bangladesh Jubo League leader and son of Land Minister Shamsur Rahman Sherif, on 29 November 2017. Bangladesh Police closed eight members of the Detective Branch of Barisal Metropolitan Police for torturing a cameraman of DBC in Barisal on 12 March 2018. The police team that attacked the journalist were led by sub-inspector Abul Bashar. According to the US State Department Human Rights Report for 2017 the government of Bangladesh forced DBC news to remove a news item titled “Bangladesh’s Hasina Survives another Attempt on Her Life.” The news was sourced to a Burmese news portal.

After the fall of the Sheikh Hasina led Awami League government, Iqbal Sobhan Chowdhury was removed from the ownership of the channel. In November 2026, he went to the office to assert ownship of the TV channel and was detained by Detective Branch. He was then arrested in a murder case related to the protests against former Prime Minister Sheikh Hasina.

== Programming ==
Rajkahon on DBC News is a primetime political talk show hosted by Sharmin Chowdhury, a television journalist. Choturnogo is a weekly show featuring individuals from the arts and entertainment field.
