= Dhaka Courier =

Bangladeshi English-language news magazine

- Executive Editor: Shayan S Khan
- Categories: Newsweekly
- Frequency: Weekly
- Founded: 1984
- Company: Cosmos Group
- Country: Bangladesh
- Language: English
- Website: Website

The Dhaka Courier (commonly known as the Courier) is a Bangladeshi English-language news magazine. Founded in 1984, it is the longest running English current affairs magazine in the country. Its content is largely focused on politics, international affairs, economics, travel, literature, society and the arts. The publication is owned by the Cosmos Group of businessman Enayetullah Khan, and is a sister concern of United News of Bangladesh (UNB), one of the country's leading news agencies.

Enayetullah Khan is the founding editor. The current executive editor of the magazine is Shayan S Khan. Its previous editors have included Syed Badrul Ahsan, Afsan Chowdhury and M Harunur Rashid.
