= Syed Borhan Kabir =

Bangladeshi journalist and television show host

- Occupations: Journalist, Writer
- Organization(s): Bangla Insider, Poriprekkhit
- Known for: Poriprekkhit
- Website: syedborhankabir.com

Syed Borhan Kabir is a Bangladeshi journalist and editor of Bangla Insider. He hosted the show Poriprekkhit on Bangladesh Television, the national channel of Bangladesh. He is the executive director of Poriprekhit, a non-profit.

== Early life ==
Kabir's mother was Syeda Rahela Begum (died 2021).

== Career ==
From 1993 to 1996, Kabir was the chief correspondent of BBC in Bangladesh. On 29 February 1996, he was arrested from his office, Ajker Kagoj, where he worked as a reporter. He had written a report which called the posting of Bangladesh Army personnel in polling station unconstitutional and had reported some soldiers refusing to following orders. He was charged with sedition and denied bail.

Kabir worked at Bhorer Kagoj.

Kabir hosted Pariprekshit TV show on Bangladesh Television. Kabir filed a Public Interest Litigation against the government of Bangladesh concerning adulted Paracetamol Syrup Case. He is an executive director of Poriprekkhit foundation.

In July 2003, Kabir filed a Public Interest Litigation along with Dr Harunur Rashid, and Waheedul Haq challenging the transfer of ownership of NTV. They argued it was owned by close relatives of government official Mosaddeq Ali Falu and Lutfuzzaman Babar and Bangladesh Telecommunication Regulatory Commission provided post facto approval based on the connection of the owners.

Kabir was arrested in February 2008 from Shantinagar. He was sent to Dhaka Central Jail after his detention. He had been charged with fraud. His book, Sheikh Hasina: From Leader to Statesperson, was launched in April 2009.

In March 2022, Dhaka Cyber Tribunal ordered the Criminal Investigation Department to investigate a Digital Security Act case against Kabir and six other journalists.

Kabir is the chairperson of Creative Media Limited, an ad agency. He had written articles critical of Tarique Rahman, acting chairman of the Bangladesh Nationalist Party. Ruhul Kabir Rizvi, Joint Secretary General of the Bangladesh Nationalist Party, accused him of spreading propaganda against the Party on behalf of the ruling Awami League.

After the fall of the Sheikh Hasina led Awami League government, the Ministry of Information cancelled his press accreditation and asked Bangladesh Financial Intelligence Unit to investigate his bank accounts along with about 30 other senior journalists in October 2022. He was accused in a murder case along with other journalists. The Anti-discrimination Students Movement he be expelled from the Jatiya Press Club and "banned" from the profession.

== Bibliography ==
- Sheikh Hasina: From Leader to Statesperson
