= Nizam Uddin Hazari =

Bangladeshi politician (born 1966)

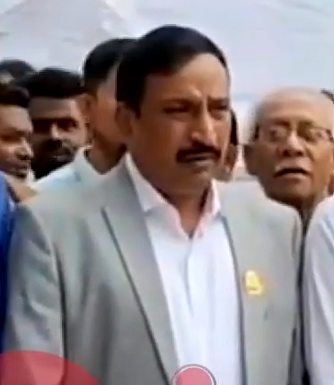

Member of the Bangladesh Parliament for Feni-2
- In office 29 January 2014 – 6 August 2024
- Preceded by: Joynal Abedin

Personal details
- Born: 1 January 1966 (age 60) Feni, East Pakistan, Pakistan
- Party: Bangladesh Awami League
- Occupation: Politician

Nizam Uddin Hazari (born 1 January 1966) is an Awami League politician and a former Jatiya Sangsad member representing the Feni-2 constituency.

== Early life ==
Hazari was born on 1 January 1966 to Dil Afroze Begum and Zainal Abedin. He has a B.com degree.

== Career ==
Hazari started politics while he was a student of Chittagong Govt. Commerce College. In the 1990s Uddin worked under AJM Nasir Uddin in Chittagong. Uddin was sentenced to jail on an arms case on 22 March 1992. He returned to Feni in 1997 to work under Joynal Hazari.

On 16 August 2000, a court in Chittagong sentenced Hazari to ten years imprisonment on an arms case. He was released after serving five years in jail. He had appealed against the verdict with Bangladesh High Court and Bangladesh Supreme Court.

Hazari was mayor of Feni in 2011.

Hazari was elected to parliament from Feni-2 in 2014 unopposed as the election was boycotted by all major political parties. He resigned from the post of mayor of Feni to participate in the election.

In May 2014, Ekramul Haque, chairperson of Fulgazi Upazila, was assassinated. All of the accused were followers of Hazari. Uddin and Joynal Hazari blamed each other over the murder. According to The Daily Star, Uddin is believed to be behind the murder but he was not charged in case.

On 8 June 2014, Bangladesh High Court issued a ruling asking the Election Commission, Government of Bangladesh, and Hazari to explain why his parliamentary membership should not be cancelled due to his conviction in the arms case. Two subsequent benches of Bangladesh High Court said they were "too embarrassed" to hear the case and it was delayed.

Hearing in the case over Hazari's parliamentary seat began on 19 June 2016 under justices Md Emdadul Huq and Md Iqbal Kabir who deferred the verdict. On 2 March 2018, Justice Md Abu Zafor Siddique gave a verdict in favor of Uddin that allowed him to keep his parliamentary seat.

In January 2017, Hazari sued the editor, Iqbal Sobhan Chowdhury, of The Daily Observer over a report in the newspaper that described him as a drug lord. In November 2017, Bangladesh Nationalist Party alleged Uddin of being responsible for an attack on the convoy of Khaleda Zia, former prime minister and chairperson of the Bangladesh Nationalist Party.

Hazari was re-elected in 2018 from Feni-2 as a candidate of Awami League. He is a trustee board member of Feni University.

Hazari visited Feni jail without permission and violating rules numerous times in 2019 to visit imprisoned Jubo League leaders.

On 13 August 2024, Hazari was named as a primary accused in a murder case filed over the killing of an auto-rickshaw driver in Feni during the Non-cooperation movement (2024) on 4 August. Following the fall of the Sheikh Hasina led Awami League government, his home in Feni was burned down and vandalized in February 2025.
