= Hayat Saif =

Bangladeshi poet and literary critic (1942–2019)

- হায়াৎ সাইফ
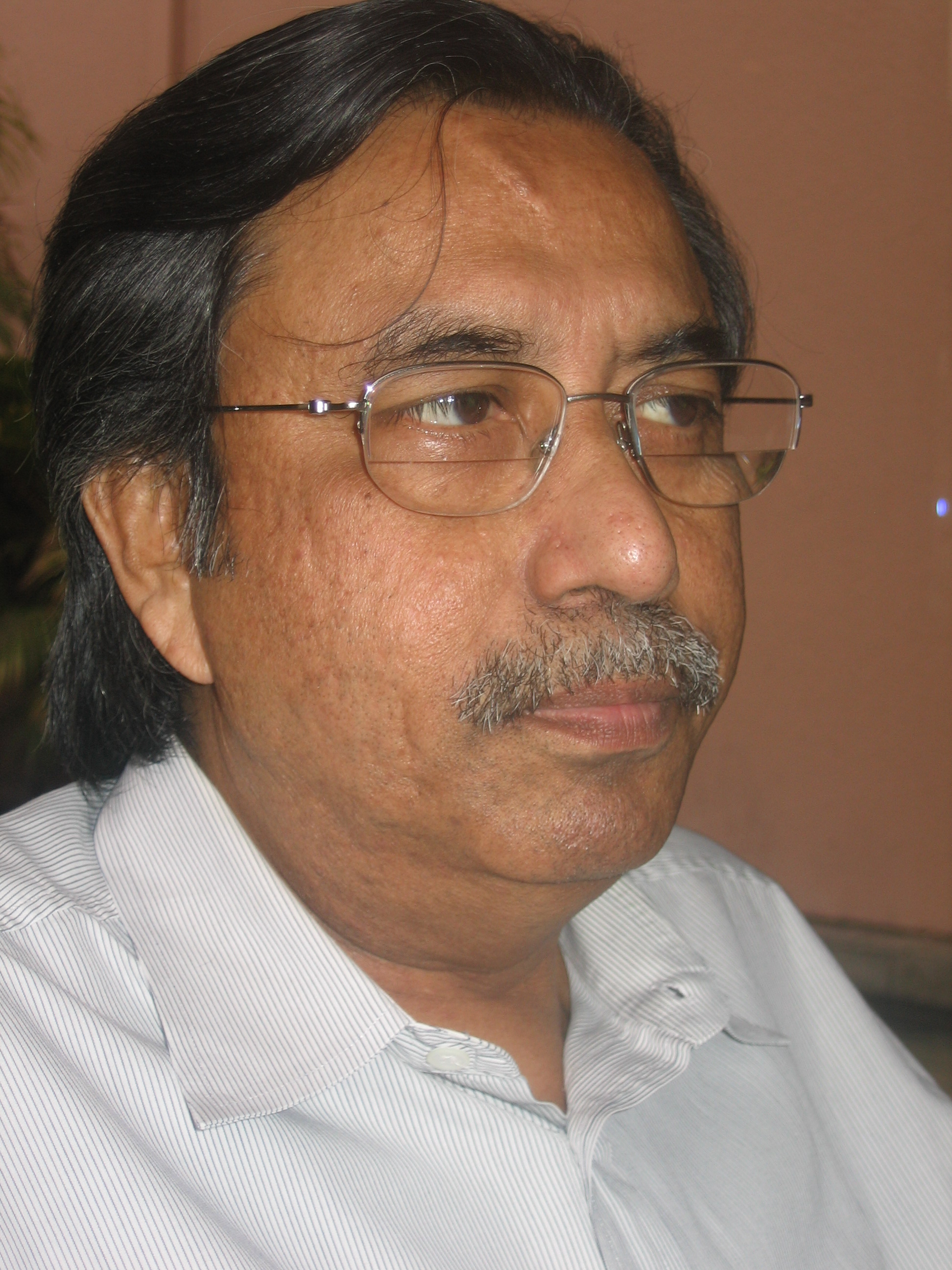
- Saif in 2009
- Born: Saiful Islam Khan; 16 December 1942; Dhaka, Bengal Presidency, British India
- Died: 13 May 2019 (aged 76); Dhaka, Bangladesh
- Occupations: poet, literary critic
- Spouse: Tahmina Islam Laki
- Children: Three sons
- Writing career
- Period: 1959–2019
- Subjects: Love, desolation
- Notable awards: Bronze Wolf Award (2005); Ekushey Padak (2018)

Saiful Islam Khan (known as Hayat Saif; 16 December 1942 – 13 May 2019) was a twentieth century modern Bengali poet and literary critic from Bangladesh. A career bureaucrat, he retired in 2000 and since then was engaged in the corporate private sector and divided his time in World Scouting and literary and artistic pursuits. He has been translated in English and Spanish and, in Bangladesh, is generally acclaimed as an intellectual interpreter of contemporary life and culture.

Saif assumed this pen name in 1961 when contributing to literary journals. In 2005, he was awarded the 305th Bronze Wolf. He was awarded Ekushey Padak in 2018 for his contribution in language and literature.

== Early life and career ==
Saif was born on 16 December 1942 in Dhaka to Moslem Uddin Khan and Begum Sufia Khan. After high school, he studied English literature and obtained his M. A. degree in 1965. After graduation, he taught in colleges for about three years and then joined the Pakistan Superior Service in the Finance cadre in 1968. He was involved in the revenue administration and tax policy making for more than three decades. He acted as Chairman of the National Board of Revenue and retired in 1999. In early 1960s, still a student, he worked as a casual announcer and newscaster in the Dhaka centre of the then Radio Pakistan and later in Pakistan Television at Lahore Center. He later continued his interests in broadcasting and telecasting and anchors literary programmers and talk shows.

== Works ==
Saif was one of the major poets of Bangladesh belonging to the generation of 1960s who set a clear trend of modern poetry in Bangladesh along with such poets as Rafiq Azad, Asad Chowdhury, Mohammad Rafiq, Abdul Mannan Syed, Rabiul Hossain, Imrul Chowdhury and others. His publications in Bengali include eight collections of poems apart from two collections of essays and a huge number of poems and articles published in various periodicals. One of his important books is titled Pradhānata Māṭi o Mānusha. His collection of literary essays Ukti o Upalabdhi was published by Shilpataru in 1992. In 2004, he jointly with Mahbub Talukdar compiled and published A Selection of Contemporary Verse from Bangladesh. His latest collection of poems Prodhanoto Smriti ebong Manusher Pathchola (Mainly memories and man's path-walking) published in 2009 contains fifty seven poems "woven in a fine thread of thought".

=== Works in translation ===
There are two collections of some of Saif's prominent poems in English rendition. One of these is Voice of Hayat Saif edited by Faizul Latif Chowdhury, published by Dibya Prakash in 1998. It contains forty-five poems translated by different hands. The volume titled Hayat Saif: Selected Poems was published by Pathak Samabesh, Dhaka, in 2001. The poems included in this volume have been translated by different hands.

=== Fiscal Frontiers ===
In 1993, Saif launched a periodic journal under the title Fiscal Frontiers. He edited it until 2000. Fiscal Frontiers was focused on revenue policy and administration, fiscal policy and international trade.

=== ICE ===
Saif was working as the Managing Editor of a magazine titled Information Communication and Entertainment, ICE in short, since 2005. This monthly is published from Dhaka.

== Quotes ==
- In spite of all the innovations, verse is still verse as differentiated from prose pieces.
- Music is the basic attribute of the language of poetry that differentiates it from other forms.
- The idea of perfection itself suggests that the condition is not achievable, at best not in the physical sense.
- I don't know really, why I write poetry. I suppose I write poems because I have to; because I have nothing better to write.

== Poetic style ==
Saif's poetic fervour emerged when he was a student of grade-VIII. In 1962, his first poems published appeared in the literary periodical Shomokal edited by Sikander Abu Zafar. In writing poetry, his preferred metrical style in 'Okkherbritta' or 'Poyer', which is the most popular among modern Bengali poems. He is prone to use Bengali language words of Sanskrit origin.

== Scouting ==
Saif was involved in national and international Scouts movement beginning in the early 1990s. He served as the National Commissioner (Public Relations and Publication) of the Bangladesh Scouts, as well as a member of the Asia-Pacific Region Marketing Committee. In 2005, he was awarded the 305th Bronze Wolf, the only distinction of the World Organization of the Scout Movement, awarded by the World Scout Committee for exceptional services to world Scouting.

== Publications ==
There are two collections of some of Saif's prominent poems in English rendition. His publications in Bengali include eight collections of poems apart from two collections of essays and a huge number of poems and articles published in various periodicals.

- Santrashe Shobash
- Roshuon Bonar Eti Katha
- Voice of Hayat Saif
- Poetry and Other Issues
- Ukti o Uplolobdhi
- International Trade and Protectionism
- Maati o Manush
