= Iqbal Sobhan Chowdhury =

Bangladeshi Journalist

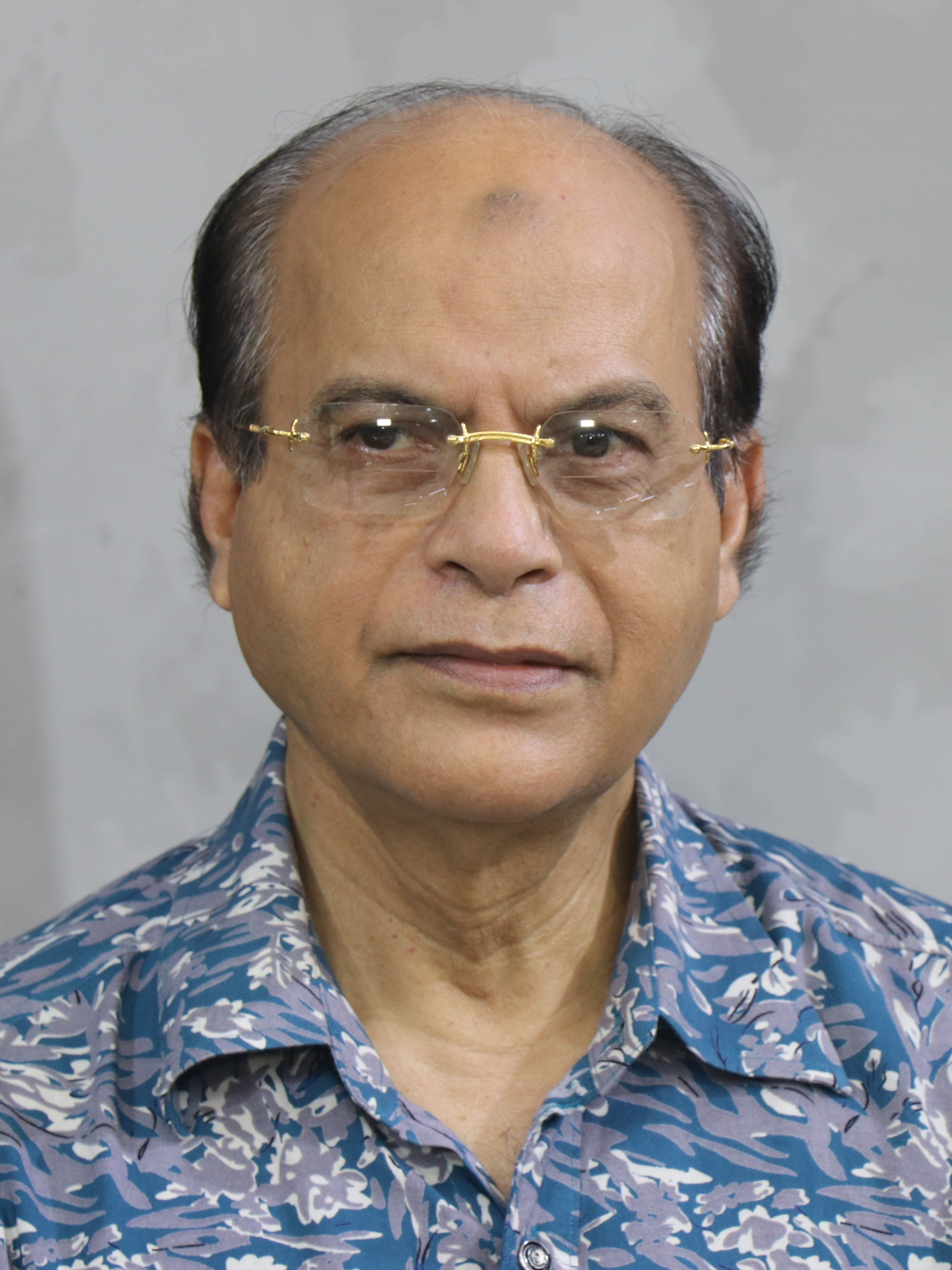
- Chowdhury in 2018
- Born: 1 April 1949 (age 77); Feni, East Bengal, Dominion of Pakistan
- Education: University of Dhaka
- Occupation: Journalist
- Known for: Journalist and Media Advisor to Prime Minister of Bangladesh Sheikh Hasina

Iqbal Sobhan Chowdhury (born 1 April 1949) is a Bangladeshi journalist and the editor of The Daily Observer. He served as the media and information affairs advisor to former Prime Minister Sheikh Hasina for almost 5 years.

== Early life and education ==
Chowdhury was born in Fatehpur of Feni Sadar Upazila in Feni District. He completed both his bachelor degree in political science and his masters in public administration at the University of Dhaka.

== Career ==
Iqbal Sobhan Chowdhury serves as the founding editor of The Daily Observer. He had been the last editor of The Bangladesh Observer before it was shut down by its owners following reports of irregularities surrounding staff pay. He is a former president of Bangladesh Federal Union of Journalists. He also served as a member of Bangladesh Film Censor Board, Bangladesh Press Council, and National Education Policy Draft Committee. He is the chairman of the Mohammadi Group and the founding chairman of DBC News.

In 2012, Chowdhury was made part of the new management board of state-run Bangladesh Sangbad Sangstha (BSS).

Chowdhury also served as the media and information affairs advisor to Prime Minister Sheikh Hasina. He was among the union leaders demanding for justice following the 2012 murder of Sagar Sarowar and Meherun Runi. In July 2013, he was appointed for the advisor role while serving as the President of a faction of the Bangladesh Federal Union of Journalists (BFUJ) and the Chairman of BSS.

In 2014, a conflict had been reported between Chowdhury and the then Managing Director of BSS and the Prime Minister's former press secretary Abul Kalam Azad.

After the fall of the Sheikh Hasina led Awami League government, Chowdhury was removed from the ownership of DBC News. In November 2026, he went to the office to assert ownship of the TV channel and was detained by Detective Branch. He was then arrested in a murder case related to the protests against former Prime Minister Sheikh Hasina.

== Controversy ==
In late 2017, Iqbal Sobhan was sued by Awami League members of parliament Enamul Haque and Nizam Uddin Hazari. The Feni district unit of Awami league alleged he was responsible for the press conference by Azharul Haque Arju that blamed the Awami League for the attack on Khaleda Zia's convoy in Feni.

In December 2017, while inaugurating a cultural event in Agartala, Chowdhury said that it is not possible for Bangladesh government to rule out terrorism in the Rohingya community. He also reportedly remarked that “We [India and Bangladesh] need uniform visas and currencies in similitude with the European Union” and further added that “Sometimes, I notice that efforts are being made to breach the bond between India and Bangladesh. The camaraderie between these two countries will remain as long as the history of our liberation is alive”.
