= Amin Mohammad Group =

Bangladeshi real estate company

- Formation: 1993
- Headquarters: Dhaka, Bangladesh
- Region served: Bangladesh
- Official language: Bengali
- Website: www.amgbd.com

Amin Mohammad Group (AMG) (Bengali: আমিন মোহাম্মদ গ্রুপ) is a Bangladeshi real estate company. The company was established in 1993. it has also diversified operations in sectors like construction, engineering, & agriculture.

== History ==
The group was founded by MM Enamul Haque in 1993. Later it expanded operations into different subsidiaries like Amin Mohammad Lands Development, Amin Mohammad Associates, Amin Mohammad Construction Limited, Amin Mohammad Media Corporation, Amin Mohammad Agro etc.

Amin Mohammad Group has contributed to the housing sector in Bangladesh by developing residential and commercial projects in Dhaka, Chattogram, Sylhet, and Cox's Bazar. The group follows the Bangladesh National Building Code (BNBC) and incorporates earthquake-resistant designs. It ensures sustainable development by preserving green spaces and engages in social initiatives such as education and healthcare support.

In Dhaka, some notable projects by the group include Alokito Bangladesh, Ashulia Model Town, Amin Mohammad City, Amin Mohammad Town, Green Model Town, and Green Bonosree.

In 2019, "Dainik Samayer Alo," a newspaper, was published by Amin Mohammad Media Communication Limited, a subsidiary of Mohammad Group.

In 2021, Amin Mohammad Group signed an agreement with Aviation Dhaka Consortium (ADC) to work on the construction of the third terminal at Hazrat Shahjalal International Airport. In 2022, Berger Paints Bangladesh signed an agreement with Amin Mohammad Construction Limited, a subsidiary of Amin Mohammad Group.

== Controversies ==
Dhaka Bailey Road fire

In 2024, a tragic fire broke out at a building named "Green Cozy Cottage" in Dhaka's Bailey Road, resulting in the death of nearly fifty people. Following the incident, the police filed a case against four individuals, including Amin Mohammad Group, identified as the building's owner.

Later, Amin Mohammad Group issued a statement claiming that they were not the owner of the "Green Cozy Cottage" building but had only completed the construction project as a developer under a joint venture agreement.

== List of business and concerns ==
- Amin Mohammad Lands Development
- Amin Mohammad Foundation Limited
- Amin Mohammad Associates
- Amin Mohammad Construction Limited
- Amin Mohammad Media Corporation
- Amin Mohammad Agro
