= Desh Rupantor =

Bangladeshi daily newspaper

- Editor: Kamal Uddin Sabuj
- Founded: December 20, 2018; 7 years ago
- Language: Bengali
- Country: Bangladesh
- Website: deshrupantor.com

Daily Desh Rupantor is a Bangladeshi daily newspaper. (Note: Bengali: দৈনিক দেশ রূপান্তর, romanized: Dainika dēśa rūpāntara)

== History ==
On 20 December 2018, Desh Rupantor was officially established and began its journey.

On August 2024, offices of The Daily Star and Desh Rupantor were attacked by violent mobs.

Desh Rupantor is published from Tejgaon Industrial Area, Dhaka, Bangladesh. The editor is Kamal Uddin Sabuj. It is printed by Mahir Ali Khan Ratul on behalf of Rupayan Media and Communications Ltd. It is published in both methods, digitally and on paper, it is published in the Bengali language.

== See also ==
- List of newspapers in Bangladesh
- Bengali-language newspapers
