= United News of Bangladesh =

Bangladesh private sector news agency

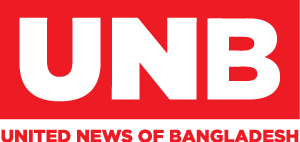
- Native name: ইউনাইটেড নিউজ অব বাংলাদেশ
- Type: News agency
- Industry: News media
- Founded: 1988
- Headquarters: Dhaka, Bangladesh
- Website: unb.com.bd

United News of Bangladesh (Bengali: ইউনাইটেড নিউজ অব বাংলাদেশ, UNB/ইউএনবি) is a Bangladeshi private news agency founded by Enayetullah Khan in 1988. It is the first fully digitized private wire service in South Asia.

UNB has news exchange agreements with other major news agencies and networks, such as Associated Press, UNI, Xinhua, Kyodo, ANSA, Suomen Tietotoimisto and Rompress.

UNB is a member of international bodies such as Organization of Asian and Pacific News Agencies, Commonwealth Press Union, Asian Mass Communication Research and Information Centre and AsiaNet.

UNB says it has correspondents and reporters in every district of Bangladesh, and serves 20 million people daily.

Shayan S. Khan has been named acting editor of UNB. He assumes the role following the departure of Mahfuzur Rahman, who recently left the post of editor to become the speechwriter for Bangladesh Prime Minister Tarique Rahman.

Before Mahfuzur, veteran journalist Farid Hossain was the editor of UNB. He has previously served as the Bangladesh bureau chief of Associated Press. He also served as the press minister at the Bangladesh High Commission in New Delhi on a two-year contract.

Along with Shayan's promotion, UNB also promoted its long-term employee Farzana Haque as the deputy editor. Farzana, who most recently served as news editor, has been with the agency since joining in 2001 as a sub-editor.

This news agency launched in 1988, the organization collects Bangladeshi and international newspapers, periodicals, radio and television news from them. UNB is organizationally affiliated with the Organization of Asia-Pacific News Agencies (OANA), the Commonwealth Press Union (CPU), member of AMIC and AsiaNet. and Bangladesh Sangbad Sangstha (BSS).

== Areas of work ==
UNB provides coverage of Bangladesh's news, from politics to economics, development to disasters, and more.

Recently, UNB assembled a team to provide comprehensive multimedia coverage of events occurring in Bangladesh.

== See also ==
- List of newspapers in Bangladesh
- Mass media in Bangladesh
- Telecommunications in Bangladesh
- List of companies of Bangladesh
