= Bangladesh Sangbad Sangstha =

Bangladeshi national news agency

Bangladesh Sangbad Sangstha (BSS)
- Native name: বাংলাদেশ সংবাদ সংস্থা (বাসস)
- Type: National news agency
- Industry: News agency
- Founded: 1 January 1972
- Headquarters: Dhaka, Bangladesh
- Key people: Kader Gani Chowdhury (Managing Director and Chief Editor)
- Website: bssnews.net

Bangladesh Sangbad Sangstha (BSS; Bengali: বাংলাদেশ সংবাদ সংস্থা, lit. 'Bangladesh News Agency') is the national news agency of Bangladesh. BSS was established on 1 January 1972 by the Government of Bangladesh soon after the Bangladesh Liberation War. Kader Gani Chowdhury is the current managing director and chief editor of the agency. He was appointed to the position on a contractual basis for one year in August 2026.

== History ==
News agencies or wire services have been in existence in present-day Bangladesh from before its independence. Notably, Reuters had branches in different parts of British India including Bengal. The state-owned Associated Press of Pakistan (APP) started functioning in Pakistan as the first local and national news agency from September 1949. It had its head office in Karachi and it covered the then East Pakistan with two branches in Dhaka and Chittagong.

After Bangladesh Liberation War, the APP operations of East Pakistan were taken over by forming the state owned news agency called Bangladesh Sangbad Sangstha (BSS). Under the Bangladesh Sangbad Sangstha Ordinance of 1979, a board of directors runs the agency. Beginning with the head office in Dhaka and a bureau in Chittagong, BSS now has bureaus in Rajshahi, Rangpur, Bogra, Khulna, Barishal, Rangamati and Sylhet and has its correspondents in all the 64 districts of the country.

== See also ==
- List of newspapers in Bangladesh
- Government agencies in Bangladesh
- List of television stations in Bangladesh
