= Lists of legislation =

This list consists of lists of legislation.

== Primary legislation by country ==
=== Australia ===
- List of acts of the Parliament of Australia
- List of acts of the First Legislative Council of New South Wales

=== Azerbaijan ===
- List of Azerbaijan legislation

=== Bangladesh ===
- List of acts of the Jatiya Sangsad (1973 onwards)
- List of ordinances issued in Bangladesh

=== British Isles ===
Legislation in the British Isles includes legislation of the United Kingdom, the Republic of Ireland, the Crown dependencies, the Kingdom of Great Britain, and the pre-union Kingdoms of England, Scotland and Ireland, and other former states. For the legislation of the kingdoms of the Heptarchy, see also Anglo-Saxon law. For Wales, see also Cyfraith Hywel.

- List of legislation in the United Kingdom
- List of acts of the Parliament of England
- List of acts of the Parliament of Great Britain
- List of acts of the Parliament of the United Kingdom
- List of acts of the Parliament of Scotland (to 1707)
- List of acts of the Scottish Parliament (1999 onwards)
- List of acts of the Parliament of Ireland (to 1800)
- List of acts of the Parliament of Northern Ireland
- List of acts of the Northern Ireland Assembly
- List of acts of the Oireachtas
- List of laws of Guernsey
- List of laws of Jersey
- List of acts of Tynwald

=== Canada ===
- List of acts of the Parliament of Canada (1867 onwards)

=== China and Hong Kong ===
- List of statutes of China
- List of Hong Kong legislation

=== India ===
- List of acts of the Parliament of India (includes acts of the Imperial Legislative Council and the Constituent Assembly of India)

=== Malaysia ===
- List of acts of the Parliament of Malaysia
- List of acts of the Parliament of Malaysia by citation number

=== New Zealand ===
- Lists of acts of the New Zealand Parliament (1840 onwards)

=== Nigeria ===
- List of Nigerian legislation

=== Philippines ===
- List of Philippine laws

=== Singapore ===
- List of acts of the Parliament of Singapore

=== South Africa ===
- List of acts of the Parliament of South Africa (1910 onwards)
- List of acts of the Western Cape Provincial Parliament (1994 onwards)

=== Sri Lanka ===
- List of acts of the Parliament of Sri Lanka, 2010–present

=== United States ===
- List of United States federal legislation

== Secondary legislation by type ==
=== Statutory instruments ===
- List of statutory instruments of Australia
- List of statutory instruments of the United Kingdom
- List of statutory instruments of Scotland
- List of Welsh statutory instruments

=== Statutory rules ===
- List of statutory rules of Northern Ireland

=== Statutory rules and orders ===
- List of statutory rules and orders of the United Kingdom
- List of statutory rules and orders of Northern Ireland
