= List of acts of the Jatiya Sangsad =

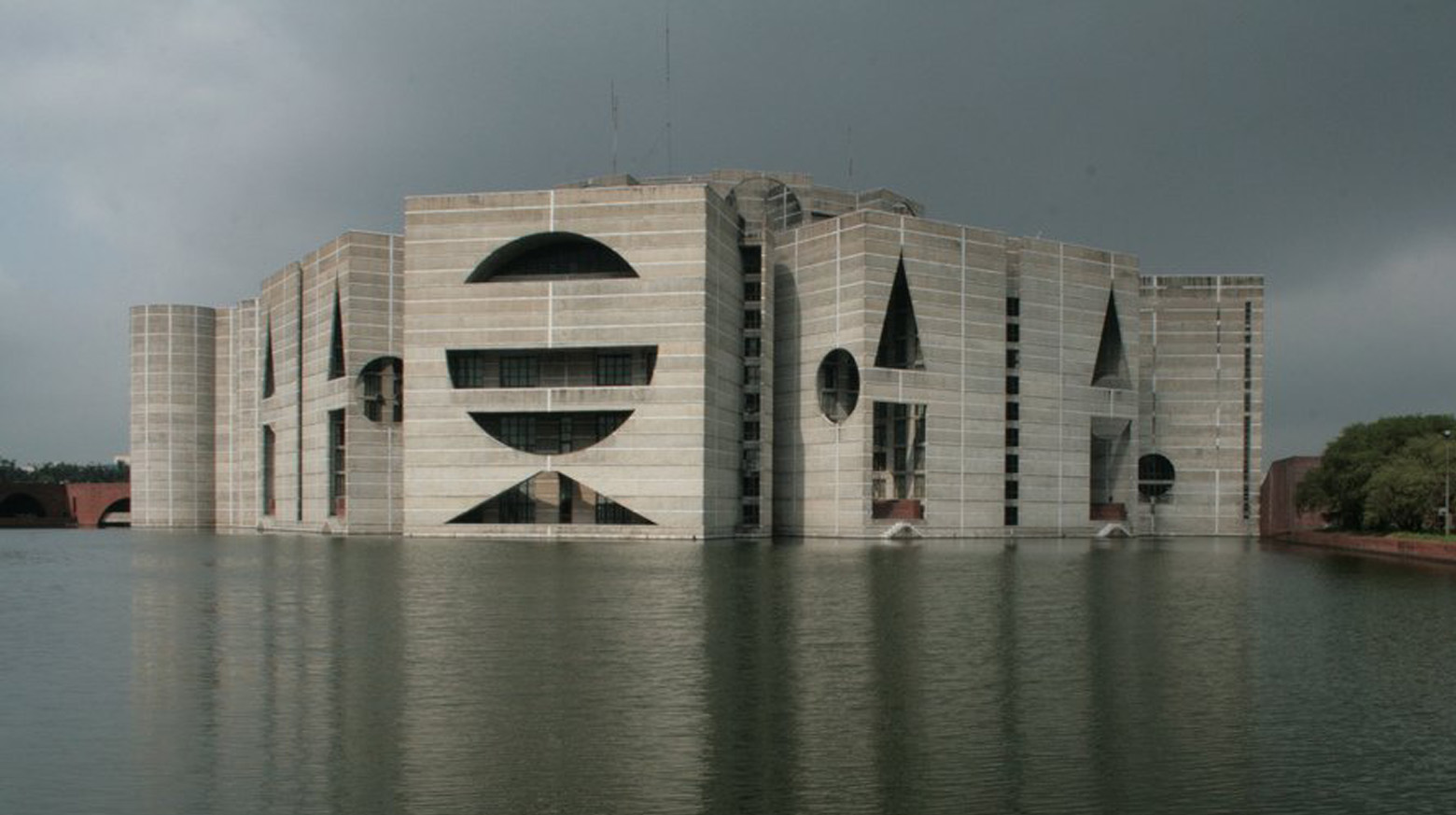
Jatiya Sangsad

This is a list of acts of the Jatiya Sangsad, the national parliament of Bangladesh.

== 1973 ==
- Ministers, Ministers of State and Deputy Ministers (Remuneration and Privileges) Act, 1973 (No 4)
- Insurance Corporation Act, 1973 (No 6) [Repealed]. See further Sadharan Bima Corporation and Jiban Bima Corporation.
- Appropriation (Vote on Account) Act, 1973 (No 7)
- Bangladesh Laws (Revision and Declaration) Act, 1973 (No 8)
- Bangladesh Rice Research Institute Act, 1973 (No 10) [Repealed]
- Finance Act, 1973 (No 11)
- Appropriation (Railways) Act, 1973 (No 12)
- Appropriation Act, 1973 (No 16)
- International Crimes (Tribunals) Act, 1973 (No 19)
- Bangladesh Fisheries Development Corporation Act, 1973 (No 22)
- Printing Presses and Publications (Declaration and Registration) Act, 1973 (No 23)
- Rajshahi University Act, 1973 (No 26)
- Bangladesh Girl Guides Association Act, 1973 (No 31). Sometimes called the Girls Guide Act.
- Chittagong University Act, 1973 (No 33)
- Jahangirnagar University Act, 1973 (No 34)

== 1974 ==
- Special Police Establishment (Repeal) Act, 1974 (No 2)
- Transfer of Railways (Repeal) Act, 1974 (No 4)
- Primary Schools (Taking Over) Act, 1974 (No 8)
- Bidi (Restriction of Manufacture) (Repeal) Act, 1974 (No 9)
- Public Servants (Retirement) Act, 1974 (No 12) [Repealed]
- Bangladesh Jute Research Institute Act, 1974 (No 13) [Repealed]
- Special Powers Act, 1974 (No 14)
- Refugees Rehabilitation Finance Corporation (Repeal) Act, 1974 (No 16)
- Bangladesh Wild Life (Preservation) (Amendment) Act, 1974 (No 17)
- Bangladesh Unnayan Gobeshona Protishthan Act, 1974 (No 19), formerly called the Bangladesh Institute of Development Studies Act, 1974 [Repealed]
- Members of the Bangladesh Public Service Commission (Terms and Conditions of Service) Act, 1974 (No 21)
- Comptroller and Auditor-General (Additional Functions) Act, 1974 (No 24)
- Press Council Act, 1974 (No 25)
- Territorial Waters and Maritime Zones Act, 1974 (No 26)
- Essential Services Laws (Amendment) Act, 1974 (No 36)
- Children Act, 1974 (No 39) [Repealed]
- Appropriation (Supplementary) Act, 1974 (No 42)
- Appropriation (Vote on Account) Act, 1974 (No 43)
- Finance Act, 1974 (No 44)
- Speaker and Deputy Speaker (Remuneration and Privileges) Act, 1974 (No 48)
- Appropriation Act, 1974 (No 50)
- Muslim Marriages and Divorces (Registration) Act, 1974 (No 52)
- Primary Education Laws (Repeal) Act, 1974 (No 55)
- National Sports Council Act, 1974 (No 57) [Repealed]
- Extradition Act, 1974 (No 58)
- Bangladesh Petroleum Act, 1974 (No 69)
- Oil and Gas Development Corporation (Repeal) Act, 1974 (No 70)
- Stamp Duties (Additional Modes of Payment) Act, 1974 (No 71)
- Record of Jute Growers (Border Areas) Act, 1974 (No 76)

== 1975 ==
- Finance Act, 1975 (No 3)
- Appropriation (Supplementary) Act, 1975 (No 4)
- Appropriation (Vote on Account) Act, 1975 (No 5)
- President's (Remuneration and Privileges) Act, 1975 (No 7)
- Prime Minister's (Remuneration and Privileges) Act, 1975 (No 9)
- Bangladesh Laws (Amendment) Act, 1975 (No 13)
- Bangladesh (Restoration of Evacuee Property) (Effect of Expiry) Act, 1975 (No 15)
- ESSO Undertaking Acquisition Act, 1975 (No 16)
- Islamic Foundation Act, 1975 (No 17)
- Blind Relief (Donation of Eye) Act, 1975 (No 25)
- Islamic Development Bank Act, 1975 (No 28)
- Services (Reorganisation and Conditions) Act, 1975 (No 32) [Repealed]
- Nationalised Banks (Transfer of Business) Act, 1975 (No 34)
- Hundred-Taka Demonetised Notes (Mode of Payment and Recovery of Taxes) Act, 1975 (No 35)
- Government-owned Newspapers (Management) Act, 1975 (No 41)
- Appropriation Act, 1975 (No 44)

== 1980 ==
- University Laws Amendment Act, 1980 (No 1)
- Banks and Financial Institutions Laws Amendment Act, 1980 (No 9)
- Foreign Private Investment (Promotion and Protection) Act, 1980 (No 11)
- Note-Books (Prohibition) Act, 1980 (No 12)
- Ombudsman Act, 1980 (No 15)
- Medical and Dental Council Act, 1980 (No 16) [Repealed]
- Appropriation (Railways Supplementary) Act, 1980 (No 20)
- Appropriation (Railways) Act, 1980 (No 21)
- Appropriation (Supplementary) Act, 1980 (No 22)
- Finance Act, 1980 (No 23)
- Appropriation Act, 1980 (No 24)
- Film Clubs (Registration and Regulation) Act, 1980 (No 28) [Repealed]
- Dowry Prohibition Act, 1980 (No 35) [Repealed]
- Bangladesh Export Processing Zones Authority Act, 1980 (No 36)
- Islamic University Act, 1980 (No 37)
- Public Examinations (Offences) Act, 1980 (No 42)

== 1981 ==
- Members of Parliament (Determination of Dispute) Act, 1980 (No 1 of 1981), passed on 27 January 1981
- Bangladesh Consumer Supplies Corporation (Repeal) Act, 1981 (No 3)
- Administrative Tribunal Act, 1980 (No 7 of 1981)
- Appropriation (Railways Supplementary) Act, 1981 (No 8)
- Appropriation (Railways) Act, 1981 (No 9)
- Appropriation (Supplementary) Act, 1981 (No 10)
- Finance Act, 1981 (No 11)
- Appropriation Act, 1981 (No 12)

== 1987 ==
- Specification (Supplementary) Act, 1987
- Specification (Advance Granting) Act, 1987
- Port of Chalna Authority (Amendment) Act, 1987 (No 1)
- Bengali Language Introduction Act, 1987 (No 2)
- Members of Parliament (Salaries and Allowances) (Amendment) Act, 1987 (No 4) or the Members' of Parliament (Remuneration and Privileges) (Amendment) Act, 1987
- Leader and Deputy Leader of the Opposition (Remuneration and Privileges) (Amendment) Act, 1987 (No 5)
- Speaker and Deputy Speaker (Remuneration and Privileges) (Amendment) Act, 1987 (No 7)
- Vice-Prime Minister's Remuneration and Special Powers Act, 1987 (No 8)
- Building Construction (Amendment) Act, 1987 (No 12)
- Criminal Law Amendment (Amendment) Act, 1987 (No 13)
- Civil Courts (Amendment) Act, 1987 (No 14)
- Shilet Shahjalal Scientific and Technological University Act, 1987 (No 15) or the Shahjalal University of Science and Technology Act, 1987
- Special Powers (Amendment) Act, 1987 (No 17)
- Bangladesh Shilpa Bank (Amendment) Act, 1987 (No 18)
- Bangladesh Shilpa Rin Sangstha (Amendment) Act, 1987 (No 19)
- Explosives (Amendment) Act, 1987 (No 20)
- Explosive Substances (Amendment) Act, 1987 (No 21)
- Local Government (Upazila Parishad and Upazila Administration Reorganisation) (Amendment) Act, 1987 (No 22)
- Local Government Laws (Amendment) Act, 1987 (No 23)
- Bangladesh Industrial Enterprises (Nationalisation) (Amendment) Act, 1987 (No 24)
- Finance Act, 1987 (No 27)
- Government and Autonomous Bodies Employees Benevolent Fund and Group Insurance (Amendment) Ordinance, 1987 (No 28)
- Town Improvement (Amendment) Act, 1987 (No 29)
- Administrative Tribunals (Amendment) Act, 1987 (No 30)
- Appropriation Act, 1987 (No 31)
- Bangladesh Biman Corporation (Amendment) Act, 1987 (No 32)
- Workmen's Compensation (Amendment) Act, 1987 (No 33)
- Presidential Election (Amendment) Act, 1987 (No 34)
- Public Demands Recovery (Amendment) Act, 1987 (No 35)
- University Laws (Amendment) Act, 1987 (No 36)
- Members' of Parliament (Salaries and Allowances) (Second Amendment) Act, 1987 (No 37)
- Rajshahi City Corporation Act, 1987 (No 38) [Repealed]

== 1988 ==
- Relief and Rehabilitation Surcharge Act, 1988
- Movable Property Possession Act, 1988
- Specification (Supplementary) Act, 1988
- Specification (Advance Granting) Act, 1988
- Finance Act, 1988
- Specification Act, 1988

== 1989 ==
- Specification (Advance Granting) Act, 1988
- Finance Act, 1988
- Specification Act, 1988
- Brick Burning (Control) Act, 1989 [Repealed]
- Iodine Deficiency Disease Prevention Act, 1989 [Repealed]
- Ordnance Factory Board (Repair) Act, 1989
- Bangladesh Debt Arbitration Act, 1989
- Hill Districts (Repeal and Enforcement and Special Provisions) Act, 1989
- Board of Investment Act, 1989 [Repealed]
- Rangamati Hill District Council Act, 1989
- Khagrachhari Hill District Council Act, 1989
- Bandarban Hill District Council Act, 1989
- Bangladesh Shilpakala Academy Act, 1989
- Land Reform Board Act, 1989
- Land Appeal Board Act, 1989
- Specification (Supplementary) Act, 1989
- Specification (Advance Granting) Act, 1989
- Finance Act, 1989
- Specification Act, 1989

== 1990 ==
- Bangladesh Computer Council Act, 1990
- Bogra Rural Development Academy Act, 1990
- Drug Control Act, 1990 [Repealed]
- Industrial Development (Regulation and Regulation) (Repel) Act, 1990
- Primary Education (Compulsory) Act, 1990
- Private Educational Institutions Teachers and Employees Welfare Trust Act, 1990
- Dhaka Electricity Distribution Authority Act, 1990
- Specification (Supplementary) Act, 1990
- Specification (Advance Granting) Act, 1990
- Donor Act, 1990
- Finance Act, 1990
- River Research Institute Act, 1990
- Khulna University Act, 1990
- Specification Act, 1990

== 1991 ==
- House Rent Control Act, 1991
- National Women's Organization Act, 1991
- Election Officer (Special Provisions) Act, 1991
- Banking-Company Act, 1991
- Specification (Supplementary) Act, 1991
- Specification (Advance Granting) Act, 1991
- Finance Act, 1991
- Value Added Tax Act, 1991 [Repealed]
- Referendum Act, 1991
- Specification (Advance Granting) Act, 1991
- Presidential Election Act, 1991
- Bangladesh Space Research and Remote Sensing Institutions Act, 1991

== 1992 ==
- Private University Act, 1992 [Repealed]
- National University Act, 1992
- Bangladesh Open University Act, 1992
- Mines and Mineral Resources (Control and Development) Act, 1992
- Bangladesh Trade and Tariff Commission Act, 1992
- Inland Naval Workers (Employment-Control) Act, 1992
- Shrimp Farming Act, 1992
- Local Government (Reorganization of Upazila Parishad and Upazila Administration) Act, 1992
- Water Resources Planning Act, 1992
- Specification (Supplementary) Act, 1992
- Specification (Advance Granting) Act, 1992
- Finance Act, 1992
- Rajshahi Metropolitan Police Act, 1992
- Specification Act, 1992
- National Local Government Institute Act, 1992

== 1993 ==
- Bangladesh Securities and Exchange Commission Act, 1993
- Specification (Supplementary) Act, 1993
- Finance Act, 1993
- Specification Act, 1993
- Nuclear Safety and Radiation Control Act, 1993 [Repealed]
- Bangladesh Jute Corporation (Repellent) Act, 1993
- Financial Institutions Act, 1993

== 1994 ==
- Conventional Law and Legal Documents (Adaptation) Act, 1994
- National Parliament Secretariat Act, 1994
- Scheduled Dargah (Management and Management) Abolition Act, 1994
- Specification (Supplementary) Act, 1994
- Finance Act, 1994
- Specification Act, 1994
- Company Act, 1994
- Suppression of Terrorist Crimes (Special Provisions) Act, 1994
- Coast Guard Act, 1994 [Repealed]

== 1995 ==
- Bangladesh Environmental Protection Act, 1995
- Ansar Bahini Act, 1995
- Battalion Ansar Act, 1995
- Village Defense Team Act, 1995
- Specification (Supplementary) Act, 1995
- Finance Act, 1995
- Specification Act, 1995
- Jamuna Multipurpose Bridge Project (Land Acquisition) Act, 1995
- Judicial Administration Training Institute Act, 1995
- Ansar-VDP Development Bank Act, 1995
- National Library Act, 1995

== 1996 ==
- Combined Funds (Supplementary Grants and Specifications) Act, 1996
- Combined Funds (Advance Granting and Specification) Act, 1996
- Water Supply and Sewerage Authority Act, 1996
- Bangladesh Agricultural Research Council Act, 1996 [Repealed]
- Bangladesh Sugarcane Research Institute Act, 1996 [Repealed]
- Specification Act, 1996
- Finance Act, 1996
- Law Commission Act, 1996
- Bangladesh Private Export Processing Zones Act, 1996
- The Indemnity (Replay) Act, 1996

== 1997 ==
- Bankruptcy Act, 1997
- Bangladesh Commerce and Investment Limited (Restructuring) Act, 1997
- Specification (Supplementary) Act, 1997
- Finance Act, 1997
- Specification Act, 1997
- Anti-Aviation Security Crime Suppression Act, 1997

== 1998 ==
- Bangabandhu Sheikh Mujib Medical University Act, 1998
- Auditor General and Controller (Remuneration and Privileges) Act, 1998
- Employment Bank Act, 1998
- Bangladesh Folk and Crafts Foundation Act, 1998
- Chittagong Hill Tracts Regional Council Act, 1998
- Specification (Supplementary) Act, 1998 13
- Finance Act, 1998
- Specification Act, 1998
- Bangabandhu Sheikh Mujibur Rahman Agricultural University Act, 1998
- Upazila Parishad Act, 1998

== 1999 ==
- Human Organ Transplantation Act, 1999
- Depository Act, 1999
- Specification (Supplementary) Act, 1999
- Finance Act, 1999
- Specification Act, 1999
- Rural Poverty Alleviation Foundation Act, 1999

== 2000 ==
- Legal Aid Act, 2000
- Women and Child Abuse Suppression Act, 2000
- Environmental Court Act, 2000 [Repealed]
- Specification (Supplementary) Act, 2000
- Finance Act, 2000
- Specification Act, 2000
- Bank Deposit Insurance Act, 2000
- District Council Act, 2000
- Terms of Recruitment and Employment of Gazetted Officers (Customs, Excise and VAT) of First and Second Class outside Cadre Act, 2000
- Privatization Act, 2000 [Repealed]
- Bangladesh Water Development Board Act, 2000
- National Housing Authority Act, 2000
- Copyright Act, 2000
- Conservation Act, 2000 for playgrounds, open spaces, parks and natural reservoirs in all municipal areas of the country, including metropolitan, divisional cities and district towns.
- Private Primary Teacher Welfare Trust Act, 2000
- Admiralty Court Act, 2000

== 2001 ==
- Arbitration Act, 2001
- The Dramatic Performance (Replay) Act, 2001
- Sylhet City Corporation Act, 2001 [Repealed]
- Barisal City Corporation Act, 2001 [Repealed]
- Bangladesh Disability Welfare Act, 2001 [Repealed]
- Bangladesh Institute of Parliamentary Studies Act, 2001
- vested property restitution law, 2001
- Bangladesh Telecommunication Regulation Act, 2001
- Dhaka Vehicle Coordination Board Act, 2001 [Repealed]
- Bangladesh Land Ports Authority Act, 2001
- Specification (Supplementary) Act, 2001
- Finance Act, 2001
- Specification Act, 2001
- Bangladesh Shilpi Kalyan Trust Act, 2001
- Rangpur University of Science and Technology Act, 2001
- Haji Mohammad Danesh University of Science and Technology Act, 2001
- Bangabandhu Sheikh Mujibur Rahman University of Science and Technology Act, 2001
- Maulana Bhasani University of Science and Technology Act, 2001
- Patuakhali University of Science and Technology Act, 2001
- Rangamati University of Science and Technology Act, 2001
- Noakhali University of Science and Technology Act, 2001
- Bogra University of Science and Technology Act, 2001
- Pabna University of Science and Technology Act, 2001
- Jessore University of Science and Technology Act, 2001
- Barisal University of Science and Technology Act, 2001
- Sher-e-Bangla Agricultural University Act, 2001
- Cooperative Societies Act, 2001
- CHT Land Dispute Settlement Commission Act, 2001
- Bangladesh Betar Authority Act, 2001
- Bangladesh Television Authority Act, 2001
- Imam and Muazzin Welfare Trust Act, 2001
- Protection of family members of the father of the nation (abolish) Act, 2001

== 2002 ==
- Acid Control Act, 2002
- Acid Crime Suppression Act, 2002
- Preservation and Display of Portraits of the Father of the Nation (Abolish) Act, 2002
- Public Security (Special Provisions) (abolish) Act, 2002
- Prevention of Money Laundering Act, 2002 [Repealed]
- National Freedom Fighters Council Act, 2002
- Law and Order Disruption (Speedy Trial) Act, 2002
- Safe Blood Transfusion Act, 2002
- Specification (Supplementary) Act, 2002
- Finance Act, 2002
- Specification Act, 2002
- Institute of Child and Maternal Health Act, 2002
- Police Staff College Act, 2002
- Private Educational Institutions Teachers and Employees Retirement Benefits Act, 2002
- Speedy Trial Tribunal Act, 2002

== 2003 ==
- Joint Operations Liability Act, 2003
- Travel Tax Act, 2003
- Village Government Act, 2003 [Repealed]
- Fire Prevention and Extinguishing Act, 2003
- Money Lending Court Act, 2003
- Bangladesh Energy Regulatory Commission Act, 2003
- Specification (Supplementary) Act, 2003
- Finance Act, 2003
- Specification Act, 2003
- Bangladesh Silk Research and Training Institute Act, 2003 [Repealed]
- Chittagong University of Engineering and Technology Act, 2003
- Rajshahi University of Engineering and Technology Act, 2003
- Khulna University of Engineering and Technology Act, 2003
- Dhaka University of Engineering and Technology, Gazipur Act, 2003
- Special Courts (Additional Duties) Act, 2003

== 2004 ==
- Bangladesh Employees Welfare Board Act, 2004
- Implementation of Court Reforms (Auxiliary Provisions) Act, 2004
- Anti-Corruption Commission Act, 2004
- Bangladesh Petroleum Institute Act, 2004
- Dispute Resolution (Municipal Area) Board Act, 2004
- Specification (Supplementary) Act, 2004
- Finance Act, 2004
- Specification Act, 2004
- EPZ Trade Unions and Industrial Relations Act, 2004 [Repealed]
- Birth and Death Registration Act, 2004
- Jatiya Sangsad (Reserved Women Seats) Election Act, 2004

== 2005 ==
- Private Teacher Registration and Certification Authority Act, 2005
- Privately owned road transport workers welfare fund
- Veterinary Act, 2005
- Bangladesh Animal and Livestock Products Quarantine Act, 2005
- Smoking and Tobacco Use (Control) Act, 2005
- National Computer Training and Research Academy Act, 2005
- Specification (Supplementary) Act, 2005 15
- Finance Act, 2005
- Specification Act, 2005
- Tax-Ombudsman Act, 2005 [Repealed]
- Jagannath University Act, 2005

== 2006 ==
- Fertilizer Management Act, 2006
- Private Security Services Act, 2006
- Comilla University Act, 2006
- National Poet Kazi Nazrul Islam University Act, 2006
- Village Court Act, 2006
- Specification (Supplementary) Act, 2006
- Finance Act, 2006
- Specification (Supplementary) Act, 2006
- Public Procurement Act, 2006
- Bangladesh Workers Welfare Foundation Act, 2006
- Product Manufacturing State Industrial Estate Workers (Terms of Service) Act, 2006 [Repealed]
- Bangladesh Accreditation Act, 2006
- Chittagong Veterinary and Animal Sciences University Act, 2006
- Microcredit Regulatory Authority Act, 2006
- Chemical Weapons (Prohibition) Act, 2006
- Cable Television Network Operation Act, 2006
- Information and Communication Technology Act, 2006
- Asian University for Women Act, 2006
- Bangladesh Labor Act, 2006
- Rangpur Carmichael University Act, 2006
- Barisal University Act, 2006
- Sylhet Agricultural University Act, 2006
- Special Benefit Act for Women Convicted in Prisons Act, 2006

== 2009 ==
- Specification (Supplementary) (Fiscal Year 2006–07) Act, 2009
- Specification (Fiscal Year 2007–08) Act, 2009
- Specification (Supplementary) (Fiscal Year 2007–08) Act, 2009
- Specification (Fiscal Year 2008–09) Act, 2009
- Election Commission Secretariat Act, 2009
- Voter List Act, 2009
- Prevention of Money Laundering Act, 2009 [Repealed]
- Finance (2007-2008 Fiscal Year) Act, 2009
- Finance (2008-2009 Fiscal Year) Act, 2009
- Anti-Terrorism Act, 2009
- Trademark Act, 2009
- Right to Information Act, 2009
- Sylhet Metropolitan Police Act, 2009
- Barisal Metropolitan Police Act, 2009
- Consumer Protection Act, 2009
- Village Government (Abolish) Act, 2009
- Begum Rokeya University, Rangpur Law, 2009
- Bangladesh University of Professionals Act, 2009
- Padma Multipurpose Bridge Project (Land Acquisition) Act, 2009
- Specification (Supplementary) Act, 2009 35
- Finance Act, 2009
- Specification Act, 2009
- Government Finance and Budget Management Act, 2009
- Protection of Terrestrial Television Broadcasting Facilities for Bangladesh Television Act, 2009
- National Human Rights Commission Act, 2009
- Local Government (Municipality) Act, 2009
- Mobile Court Act, 2009
- Local Government (City Corporation) Act, 2009
- Local Government (Union Parishad) Act, 2009
- Protection of Family Members of the Father of the Nation Act, 2009

== 2010 ==
- Fisheries and Animal Feed Act, 2010
- National Identity Registration Act, 2010
- Bangabandhu Sheikh Mujibur Rahman Novo Theater Act, 2010
- Bangladesh Hi-Tech Park Authority Act, 2010
- National Museum of Science and Technology Act, 2010
- National Institute of Biotechnology Act, 2010
- Bangladesh National Scientific and Technical Documentation Center (Bansdock) Act, 2010
- Insurance Development and Regulation Authority Act, 2010
- Insurance Act, 2010
- Fisheries Hatchery Act, 2010
- Minority Cultural Institutions Act, 2010
- Chartered Secretaries Act, 2010
- Specification (Supplementary) Act, 2010
- Bangladesh Tourism Protected Areas and Special* Tourism Areas Act, 2010
- Specification Act, 2010
- Private University Act, 2010
- Bangladesh Tourism Board Act, 2010
- Bangladesh Gas Act, 2010
- Bangladesh Economic Zones Act, 2010
- EPZ Workers Welfare Association and Industrial Relations Act, 2010 [Repealed]
- Real Estate Development and Management Act, 2010
- Bangladesh Textile University Act, 2010
- Mandatory use of jute wrappers in products Act, 2010
- Rapid increase in supply of electricity and fuel (special provisions) Act, 2010
- Expatriate Welfare Bank Act, 2010
- Environmental Court Act, 2010
- Climate Change Trust Act, 2010
- Domestic Violence (Prevention and Protection) Act, 2010
- International Mother Tongue Institute Act, 2010
- Bangladesh Medical and Dental Council Act, 2010
- Balumhal and Soil Management Act, 2010
- Border Guard Bangladesh Act, 2010

== 2011 ==
- Bangabandhu Sports Welfare Foundation Act, 2011
- Plant Quarantine Act, 2011
- Public Interest Information Disclosure (Protection) Act, 2011
- Specification (Supplementary) Act, 2011
- Tax Ombudsman (Abolish) Act, 2011
- Dhaka Elevated Expressway Project (Land Acquisition) Act, 2011
- Finance Act, 2011
- Specification Act, 2011
- Vagrant and Homeless Persons (Rehabilitation) Act, 2011
- Animal Slaughter and Meat Quality Control Act, 2011
- Science and Technology Development Trust Act, 2011
- Film Parliament (Registration) Act, 2011

== 2012 ==
- Wall Writing and Posting (Control) Act, 2012
- Public Servants (Retirement) (Amendment) Act, 2012
- Prevention and Suppression of Human Trafficking Act, 2012
- Mutual Assistance Act on Crime, 2012
- Prevention of Money Laundering Act, 2012
- Dhaka Transport Coordinating Authority Act, 2012
- Pornography Control Act, 2012
- Bangladesh Agricultural Research Council Act, 2012
- Bangabandhu Poverty Alleviation and Rural Development Academy Act, 2012
- Prime Minister's Education Assistance Trust Act, 2012
- Bangladesh Applied Nutrition Research and Training Institute Act, 2012
- Bangladesh Atomic Energy Control Act, 2012
- Specification (Supplementary) Act, 2012
- Competition Act, 2012
- Product Manufacturing State Industrial Estate Workers (Terms of Service) Act, 2012 [Repealed]
- Specification Act, 2012
- Public University Teachers (Retirement) (Special Provisions) Act, 2012
- Wildlife (Conservation and Security) Act, 2012
- Disaster Management Act, 2012
- Power of Attorney Act, 2012
- Hindu Marriage Registration Act, 2012
- Value Added Tax and Supplementary Duty Act, 2012
- Sustainable and Renewable Energy Development Authority Act, 2012

== 2013 ==
- Court Contempt Act, 2013
- Waqf (Transfer and Development of Property) Special Provisions Act, 2013
- Implementation of certain ordinances issued during the period from 15 August 1975 to 9 April 1979 (Special Provisions) Act, 2013
- Implementation of certain Ordinances (Special Provisions) Act, 2013, issued from March 24, 1982, to November 11, 1986.
- Statistics Act, 2013
- Bangladesh Silk Development Board Act, 2013
- Bangladesh Water Act, 2013
- Exchanges Demutualization Act, 2013
- Bangladesh Rubber Board Act, 2013
- Specification (Supplementary) Act, 2013
- Bangladesh Film and Television Institute Act, 2013
- Children's Act, 2013
- Specification Act, 2013
- Road Maintenance Fund Board Act, 2013
- National River Protection Commission Act, 2013
- Bangla Academy Act, 2013
- Breastfeeding Alternatives, Baby Foods, Commercially Manufactured Baby Extra Feeds and Consumption Equipment (Marketing Control) Act, 2013
- Islamic Arabic University Act, 2013
- Rights and Protection of Persons with Disabilities Act, 2013
- Safe Food Act, 2013
- The Multi-Level Marketing Activities (Regulation) Act, 2013
- Bangladesh Science and Industry Research Council Act, 2013
- Bangabandhu Sheikh Mujibur Rahman Maritime University, Bangladesh Law, 2013
- Overseas Employment and Immigration Act, 2013
- Parental Maintenance Act, 2013
- Torture and Death in Custody (Prevention) Act, 2013
- Neuro-Developmental Disability Protection Trust Act, 2013
- Pigeon Port Authority Act, 2013
- Geographical Indications Products (Registration and Protection) Act, 2013
- Asian Reinsurance Corporation Act, 2013
- Grameen Bank Act, 2013
- Rural Electrification Board Act, 2013
- Brick Preparation and Lower Installation (Control) Act, 2013
- Bangladesh Travel Agency (Registration and Control) Act, 2013
- Bangladesh Weaving Board Act, 2013
- Vitamin ‘A’ Enrichment in Edible Oil Act, 2013
- Bangladesh Institute of International and Strategic Studies Act, 2013

== 2014 ==
- Specification (Supplementary) Act, 2014
- Finance Act, 2014
- Specification Act, 2014
- Bangladesh Journalist Welfare Trust Act, 2014
- Rural Savings Bank Act, 2014
- CHT Development Board Act, 2014
- Deoxyribonucleic Acid (DNA) Act, 2014
- Investment Corporation of Bangladesh Act, 2014
- Non-Formal Education Act, 2014
- Bangladesh Hotel and Restaurant Act, 2014
- Rajshahi Krishi Unnayan Bank Act, 2014

== 2015 ==
- Metro Rail Act, 2015
- Bangladesh Energy and Power Research Council Act, 2015
- Formalin Control Act, 2015
- Government Vehicles (Use Control) Act, 2015
- Bangladesh Oceanographic Research Institute Act, 2015
- Youth Organization (Registration and Management) Act, 2015
- Specification (Supplementary) Act, 2015
- Finance Act, 2015
- Specification Act, 2015
- Khulna Agricultural University Act, 2015
- Export Development Bureau Act, 2015
- International Finance Corporation Act, 2015
- Financial Reporting Act, 2015
- Bangladesh Public-Private Partnership Act, 2015
- Nuclear Power Plant Act, 2015
- Development Surcharge and Levy (Imposition and Recovery) Act, 2015
- Public Servants (Marriage with Foreign Citizens) Act, 2015

== 2016 ==
- Bangladesh Tea Workers Welfare Fund Act, 2016
- Railway Safety Forces Act, 2016
- Surplus Government Employees Assimilation Act, 2016 [Repealed]
- Bangabandhu Science and Technology Fellowship Trust Act, 2016
- Asian Infrastructure Investment Bank Act, 2016
- Pigeon Port Project (Land Acquisition) Act, 2016
- Cox's Bazar Development Authority Act, 2016
- Bangladesh Petroleum Corporation Act, 2016
- Bangladesh Coast Guard Act, 2016
- Department of Defense (Sovereignty) Act, 2016
- Chittagong Medical University Act, 2016
- Rajshahi Medical University Act, 2016
- Specification (Supplementary) Act, 2016
- Finance Act, 2016
- Specification Act, 2016
- Rabindra University, Bangladesh Law, 2016
- Bangabandhu Sheikh Mujibur Rahman Digital University, Bangladesh Law, 2016
- Petroleum Act, 2016
- Youth Welfare Fund Act, 2016
- Bangladesh Bridge Authority Act, 2016
- Railway Property (Recovery of Illegal Possession) Act, 2016
- Bangladesh Investment Development Authority Act, 2016
- Tea Act, 2016
- Presidential Retirement, Rewards and Other Benefits Act, 2016
- Foreign Grants (Voluntary Activities) Regulation Act, 2016
- Bangladesh National Cadet Corps Act, 2016
- Bangabandhu National Agriculture Award Trust Act, 2016
- Bangladesh Nursing and Midwifery Council Act, 2016
- Bus Rapid Transit (BRT) Act, 2016

== 2017 ==
- Cadet College Act, 2017
- Bangladesh Biodiversity Act, 2017
- Civil Aviation Authority Act, 2017
- Bangladesh Rural Development Academy Act, 2017
- Jute Act, 2017
- Child Marriage Prohibition Act, 2017
- Bangladesh Development Research Institute Act, 2017
- Bangladesh Accreditation Council Act, 2017
- Bangladesh Shipping Corporation Act, 2017
- Bangladesh Atomic Agriculture Research Institute (BINA) Act, 2017
- Bangladesh Agricultural Research Institute (BARI) Act, 2017
- Specification (Supplementary) Act, 2017
- Finance Act, 2017
- Specification Act, 2017
- Bangladesh Jute Research Institute Act, 2017
- Bangladesh Road Transport Authority Act, 2017
- Civil Aviation Act, 2017
- Bangladesh Rice Research Institute Act, 2017
- Real Estate Acquisition and Possession Act, 2017
- Bangladesh Wheat and Maize Research Institute Act, 2017
- Bangladesh Atomic Energy Commission Act, 2017
- Bangamata Sheikh Fazilatunnesa Mujib University of Science and Technology Act, 2017

== 2018 ==
- Bangladesh College of Physicians and Surgeons Act, 2018
- Rajshahi Development Authority Act, 2018
- Groundwater Management Act for Agriculture, 2018
- Seed Act, 2018
- Power Act, 2018
- Bangladesh Ship Recycling Act, 2018
- Sheikh Hasina University Act, 2018
- One Stop Service Act, 2018
- Poet Nazrul Institute Act, 2018
- Chiefs of Defense Forces (Recruitment, Salary, Allowances and Other Benefits) Act, 2018
- Sheikh Hasina National Youth Development Institute Act, 2018
- Bangladesh Rural Development Board Act, 2018
- Buddhist Religious Welfare Trust Act, 2018
- Christian Religious Welfare Trust Act, 2018
- Gazipur Metropolitan Police Act, 2018
- Rangpur Metropolitan Police Act, 2018
- Specification (Supplementary) Act, 2018
- Finance Act, 2018
- Specification Act, 2018
- Pesticides (Pesticides) Act, 2018
- Bangladesh Industrial Establishment Nationalization Act, 2018
- Sugar (Road Development Cess) (abolish) Act, 2018
- Cantonment Act, 2018
- Weather Act, 2018
- Wage Earners Welfare Board Act, 2018
- Chittagong Development Authority Act, 2018
- Khulna Development Authority Act, 2018
- Press Institute Bangladesh (PIB) Act, 2018
- Bangladesh Agriculture Development Corporation Act, 2018
- Barind Multipurpose Development Authority Act, 2018
- Textile Act, 2018
- Sylhet Medical University Act, 2018
- Dowry Prohibition Act, 2018
- National Planning and Development Academy Act, 2018
- Hindu Welfare Trust Act, 2018
- Agricultural Marketing Act, 2018
- National Skills Development Authority Act, 2018
- Digital Security Act, 2018
- Road Transport Act, 2018
- Equivalent Payment Act, 2018
- National Sports Council Act, 2018
- Productive state-owned industrial enterprise workers (terms of service) Act, 2018
- Bangladesh Muktijoddha Welfare Trust Act, 2018
- Community Clinic Health Assistance Trust Act, 2018
- Bangladesh Livestock Research Institute Act, 2018
- Housing and Building Research Institute Act, 2018
- Weight and Measurement Standards Act, 2018
- Government Employment Act, 2018
- Bangladesh Shishu Academy Act, 2018
- Mental Health Act, 2018
- Infectious Diseases (Prevention, Control and Eradication) Act, 2018
- National Curriculum and Textbook Board Act, 2018
- Drug Control Act, 2018
- Bangladesh Public Administration Training Center Act, 2018
- Bangladesh News Agency Act, 2018
- Bangladesh Technical Education Board Act, 2018
- Bangladesh Standards and Testing Institution Act, 2018
- Fisheries Quarantine Act, 2018
- Bangladesh Fisheries Research Institute Act, 2018
- Cost and Management Accountants Act, 2018
- Bangladesh Rehabilitation Council Act, 2018

== 2019 ==
- Bangladesh EPZ Labor Act, 2019
- Bangabandhu Sheikh Mujibur Rahman Aviation and Aerospace University Act, 2019
- Plant Breed Conservation Act, 2019
- Bangladesh National Social Welfare Council Act, 2019
- Insurance Corporation Act, 2019
- Specification (Supplementary) Act, 2019
- Specification Act, 2019
- Animal Welfare Act, 2019
- Bangladesh Veterinary Council Act, 2019
- Bangladesh Sugarcrop Research Institute Act, 2019
- Bangladesh's flag-carrying ships (protection of interests) Act, 2019
- Bangladesh Industrial Technical Assistance Center (BITAC) Act, 2019

== 2020 ==
- Bangladesh Tariff Commission (Amendment) Act, 2020
- Voter List (Amendment) Act, 2020
- Bangladesh Sports Education Institutions Act, 2020
- Autonomous, Semi-Autonomous, Statutory Government Authorities, Public Non-Financial Corporations and Self-Governing Institutions.
- Bangladesh Road Transport Corporation Act, 2020
- Bangladesh Lighthouse Act, 2020
- Companies (Amendment) Act, 2020
- Specification (Supplementary) Act, 2020
- Finance Act, 2020
- Specification Act, 2020
- Information Technology Use Act by Court, 2020
- Bangladesh Bank (Amendment) Act, 2020
- Gazipur Development Authority Act, 2020
- Bangladesh Engineering Research Council Act, 2020
- Bangladesh Reference Institute for Chemical Measurements Act, 2020
- Chandpur University of Science and Technology Act, 2020
- Bangabandhu Sheikh Mujibur Rahman University, Kishoreganj Act, 2020
- Habiganj Agricultural University Act, 2020
- Marine Fisheries Act, 2020
- Fisheries and Fisheries (Inspection and Quality Control) Act, 2020
- Air Transport (Montreal Convention) Act, 2020
- Prevention of Violence against Women and Children (Amendment) Act, 2020
- Sunamganj University of Science and Technology Act, 2020
- Companies (Second Amendment) Act, 2020
- Bangladesh Energy Regulatory Commission (Amendment) Act, 2020
- Narcotics Control (Amendment) Act, 2020
- Bangladesh Madrasa Education Board Act, 2020

== 2021 ==
- Intermediate and Secondary Education (Amendment) Act, 2021
- Bangladesh Technical Education Board (Amendment) Act, 2021
- Bangladesh Madrasa Board of Education (Amendment) Act, 2021
- Bangladesh Travel Agency (Registration and Control) (Amendment) Act, 2021
- Civil Court (Amendment) Act, 2021
- Sheikh Hasina Medical University, Khulna, Law, 2021
- Specification (Supplementary) Act, 2021
- Iodized Salt Act, 2021
- Hajj and Umrah Management Act, 2021
- Child Care Center Act, 2021
- Finance Act, 2021
- Specification Act, 2021
- Bangladesh Film Artists Welfare Trust Act, 2021
- Constituency Boundary Act, 2021
- Gandhi Ashram (Board of Trustees) Act, 2021
- Bangladesh Legal Practitioners and Bar Council (Amendment) Act, 2021
- Medical College (Governing Body) (Replay) Act, 2021
- Medical Degree (Replay) Act, 2021
- Bangladesh Children's Hospitals and Institutes Act, 2021
- Kurigram Agricultural University Act, 2021
- Bangladesh National Archives Act, 2021
- Rapid increase in supply of electricity and fuel (special provisions) (Amendment) Act, 2021
- Leader of the Opposition and Deputy Leader (Prizes and Privileges) Act, 2021
- Special Security Forces Act, 2021
- Bangladesh House Building Finance Corporation (Amendment) Act, 2021
- Bangladesh Tour Operators and Tour Guides (Registration and Management) Act, 2021
- Banker's Book Evidence Act, 2021
- Highways Act, 2021
- Territorial Waters and Maritime Zones (Amendment) Act, 2021
- Judges of the Supreme Court of Bangladesh (Rewards and Privileges) Act, 2021
- Judge of the Supreme Court of Bangladesh (Travel Allowance) Act, 2021

== 2022 ==
- Chief Election Commissioner and Other Election Commissioners Appointment Act, 2022
- Bangabandhu Sheikh Mujibur Rahman University of Science and Technology, Pirojpur Act, 2022
- Bangladesh National Museum Act, 2022
- Local Government (Municipality) (Amendment) Act, 2022
- Bangladesh Patent Act, 2022
- Boiler Act, 2022
- Mongla Port Authority Act, 2022
- Chittagong Port Authority Act, 2022
- Trade Organization Act, 2022
- District Council (Amendment) Act, 2022
- Bangladesh Tourism Corporation (Amendment) Act, 2022
- The Specification (Supplement) Act, 2022
- Finance Act, 2022
- Specification Act, 2022
- National Freedom Fighters Council Act, 2022
- Private Medical Colleges and Dental Colleges Act, 2022
- Public Debt Act, 2022
- Bangladesh Atomic Energy Commission (Amendment) Act, 2022
- Bangladesh Oil, Gas and Mineral Resources Corporation Act, 2022
- Evidence (Amendment) Act, 2022
- International Center for Biodiversity Research, Bangladesh, Law, 2022

== 2023 ==
- Bangladesh Supreme Court Judges (Leave, Pension and Privileges) Act, 2023
- Bangladesh Public Works Commission Act, 2023
- Bangladesh Nursing and Midwifery Council (Amendment) Act, 2023
- Universal Pension Management Act, 2023
- Zakat Fund Management Act, 2023
- Bangladesh Energy Regulatory Commission (Amendment) Act, 2023
- Chittagong Shahi Jame Masjid Act, 2023
- Mujibnagar University, Meherpur Act, 2023
- Bangabandhu Sheikh Mujibur Rahman University, Naogaon Act, 2023
- Markets (Establishment and Management) Act, 2023

== See also ==
- List of ordinances issued in Bangladesh
