= K. M. Emrul Kayesh =

Bangladeshi judge

Justice of the High Court Division of Bangladesh

K. M. Emrul Kayesh is a judge of the High Court Division of the Bangladesh Supreme Court.

== Early life ==
Emrul Kayesh was born on 25 May 1966. He has a bachelor of law and master of law from the University of Dhaka.

== Career ==
Emrul Kayesh joined the judicial branch of the Bangladesh Civil Service on 25 April 1994 as an assistant judge.

On 14 June 2015, Emrul Kayesh was promoted to district and sessions judge.

In 2019, Emrul Kayesh was the judge of the Anti-Corruption Commission case against former chief justice Surendra Kumar Sinha. In July, he sent Mizanur Rahman, former deputy inspector general, to prison after rejecting his bail application in a corruption case.

Emrul Kayesh granted bail to the president of Kalabagan Krira Chakra Club over illegal gambling. In August 2020, Emrul Kayesh denied bail to photojournalist Shafiqul Islam Kajol in a Digital Security Act case. He denied bail to Didarul Islam Bhuiyan of Rastrachinta in another Digital Security Act case. In September 2020, Dhaka Metropolitan Sessions Judge Emrul Kayesh sentenced three police officers of Pallabi Police Station to life imprisonment over the 2014 custodial death of Ishtiaque Hossain Jonny. This was the first verdict in Bangladesh under the Torture and Custodial Death (Prevention) Act, 2013 and was described by The Daily Star as a "historic verdict". The verdict was praised by Mia Seppo, United Nations resident coordinator, and Earl R. Miller, ambassador of the United States to Bangladesh. In December 2020, Emrul Kayesh ordered the seizure of 670 bank accounts and immovable properties of Shahid Islam Papul, a member of parliament detained in Kuwait on corruption charges.

Emrul Kayesh found Irfan Selim, son of Awami League member of parliament Haji Selim, innocent in an arms case due to lack of evidence. In June 2021, Emrul Kayesh ordered the freeze of the bank accounts of Sayeed Khokon, former mayor of Dhaka South City Corporation, and his family members on the request of the Anti-Corruption Commission. He rejected the bail petition of Islamic preacher Mamunul Haque in three cases. He issued a travel ban on three members of parliament, Shamsul Haque Chowdhury, Nurunnabi Chowdhury Shaon, and Moazzem Hossain Ratan. Cartoonist Ahmed Kabir Kishore filed a case under Torture and Custodial Death (Prevention) Act alleging he was tortured in custody with the Dhaka Metropolitan Sessions Judge. Emrul Kayesh ordered Police Bureau of Investigation who submitted a report against the alleged torture. Kishore filed a no-confidence motion against the report. He was the judge at the trial of Salim Prodhan, who operated illegal casinos in Dhaka.

In March 2022, Emrul Kayesh issued arrest warrant against four Bangladesh Nationalist Party politicians, including Ruhul Kabir Rizvi. In May, Emrul Kayesh gave permission to the Anti-Corruption Commission to interrogate four members of the trustee board of North South University over a 3.04 billion BDT corruption case. He also refused to hear the bail application of the four. In June 2022, Emrul Kayesh heard the sedition case against former prime minister Khaleda Zia, who was on trial in 11 cases. On 31 July 2022, Emrul Kayesh was appointed an additional judge of the High Court Division by President Mohammad Abdul Hamid.
