= Abdullah Al Momen =

Abdullah Al Momen is a colonel of the Bangladesh Army and a former commander of the Rapid Action Battalion-1. He was charged with crimes against humanity after the fall of the Sheikh Hasina led Awami League government.

== Career ==
Momen had served as the commanding officer of the Rapid Action Battalion-1, responsible for Dhaka. In 2021, he led the Rapid Action Battalion in detaining gangster Nafiz Mohammed Alam with illegal alcohol and narcotics for operating an unlawful liquor business called "Syndicate International". He detained Bazlur Rahman, an Awami League leader and alleged drug lord of Chonpara slum. He busted an organ trafficking ring in July 2022. A man was killed in a crossfire with his unit in November 2022, with an eyewitness telling the media it was an execution. He led an operation against the Global Human Rights and Environment Development Society, an MLM company. He was returned to the Bangladesh Army in June 2023 and was replaced by Lieutenant Colonel Muhammad Mostaq Ahmad.

In April 2025, the Muhammad Yunus-led interim government placed him under house arrest along with Brigadier General S. M. Zakaria Hussain, Brigadier General Imran Hamid, Lieutenant Colonel Muhammad Redwanul Islam, and Major Md Noman Al Faruk. He was one of 25 former and serving security officers charged at the International Crimes Tribunal-1 with crimes against humanity over enforced disappearance during the rule of the Sheikh Hasina-led Awami League regime. Former Prime Minister Sheikh Hasina was also named along with the security officers. The court issued an arrest warrant against him on 8 October 2025.
