= Nafiz Mohammed Alam =

Nafiz Mohammed Alam, also known as Nafiz Don, is a Bangladeshi gangster and survivor of torture by law enforcement officers. Deutsche Welle interviewed him in partnership with Netra News for their documentary Inside the Death Squad, which examined human rights abuses by Rapid Action Battalion. The Bangladesh Nationalist Party condemned his arrest after the documentary came out. He was accused of the murder of 14-year-old Adnan Kabir as part of a turf war between teen gangs in Uttara.

Alam is an activist of the Bangladesh Jatiotabadi Chatradal, the student wing of the Bangladesh Nationalist Party.

== Career ==
Alam secured bail in a case filed after his gang, Disco Boys, stabbed a member of the Nine Star Group gang. Alam was accused of the murder of 14-year-old Adnan Kabir in 2017. Kabir was murdered over the rivalry between teen gangs in Uttara. He was reported to have led one of the teen gangs. He was detained, then 19-year-old, but was released on bail.

In 2021, the Rapid Action Battalion, led by Lieutenant Colonel Abdullah Al Momen, detained Alam with illegal alcohol and narcotics for operating an illegal liquor business called "Syndicate International". Rapid Action Battalion seized 361 bottles, 299 beer cans, cannabis, pethidine, police gear, and a car disguised as a police car. Three cases were filed against him with Vattara Police Station under the Narcotics Control Act, Pornography Control Act and Telecommunication Act.

Deutsche Welle interviewed Alam for the Inside the Death Squad documentary on extrajudicial actions by the Rapid Action Battalion. In the documentary, he alleged Rapid Action Battalion-1 tortured him after his detention. He was detained by the Rapid Action Battalion in April 2023 from Bashundhara Residential Area after the documentary aired. During the arrest, law enforcement officials seized illegal liquor (26 bottles and 32 cans), narcotics, and a motorbike that had a police sign attached to it. He allegedly operated an illegal social media-based alcohol supplier called "Syndicate International." He was sent to Dhaka Central Jail in a case filed under the Narcotics Control Act. Aside from that, he had five other cases against him.

Deutsche Welle journalists Birgitta Schülke and Naomi Conrad expressed concern over his detention. Human Rights Watch's Asia division deputy director Phil Robertson expressed concern over Alam's safety. The Bangladesh Nationalist Party and its general secretary Mirza Fakhrul Islam Alamgir condemned his arrest. Tasneem Khalil tweeted about concerns about his detention.

Following the fall of the Sheikh Hasina led Awami League government, Alam was again arrested in October 2024 with drugs and a handgun. At the time, Kaler Kantho claimed he was an activist of the Bangladesh Chattra League, but Rumour Scanner found he was, in fact, associated with the Bangladesh Nationalist Party and was against the Awami League. Additionally, videos from the July protests against Prime Minister Sheikh Hasina showed Alam involved in the attack on a police station in Uttara.
