= M Imran Hamid =

Bangladesh Army officer

Imran Hamid
- Education: Bangladesh Military Academy
- Military career
- Allegiance: Bangladesh
- Branch: Bangladesh Army; Border Guard Bangladesh
- Service years: 1994 - present
- Rank: Brigadier General
- Unit: East Bengal Regiment
- Commands: Commander of 46th Independent Infantry Brigade; Sector Commander of BGB

M. Imran Hamid is a one star officer of the Bangladesh Army and former independent director of the Dhaka Stock Exchange. Hamid was the commander of the 46th Independent Infantry Brigade during the July Revolution.

== Career ==
Hamid attended the 2021 Bangladesh Disaster Response Exercise and Exchange, arranged by the Ministry of Disaster Management and Relief, Armed Forces Division, and United States Army Pacific Command. He inaugurated the Bangabandhu Sheikh Mujib Dhaka Marathon - 2021 at Dhaka Cantonment. He was one of the first five people to receive the COVID-19 vaccine in Bangladesh.

Hamid was appointed an independent director of the Dhaka Stock Exchange in March 2024. During protests against Prime Minister Sheikh Hasina in July, journalist Zulkarnain Saer Khan claimed Hamid and Brigadier General S. M. Zakaria Hossain were leading block raids in Dhaka. He commanded the 46th Independent Infantry Brigade during the protests and had described the protesters as vandals. After the fall of the Sheikh Hasina-led Awami League government, the board of the Dhaka Stock Exchange and Chittagong Stock Exchange was dissolved, removing him from the post of independent director.

In April 2025, Hamid was placed under house arrest along with Lieutenant Colonel Muhammad Redwanul Islam, Lieutenant Colonel Abdullah Al Momen, and Major Md Noman Al Faruk.
