= Muhammad Mostaq Ahmad =

Bangladesh Army officer

- মোহাম্মদ মোস্তাক আহমদ
- Military career
- Allegiance: Bangladesh
- Branch: Bangladesh Army
- Rank: Lieutenant colonel
- Unit: Rapid Action Battalion

Muhammad Mostaq Ahmad is a Bangladesh Army lieutenant colonel and former commander of the Rapid Action Battalion-1, a paramilitary force of Bangladesh.

== Career ==
Ahmad was deputed to the Rapid Action Battalion (RAB). He served in Dhaka and Khulna regions.

On 3 June 2023, Ahmad, was appointed commanding officer of Rapid Action Battalion-1. His appointment came during a series of reshuffles of key RAB positions in 2023. These included the appointment of Colonel Md Mahabub Alam as additional director general for operations and the return of Lieutenant Colonel Abdullah Al Momen, his predecessor as commanding officer of RAB-1, to Bangladesh Army.

Ahmad led a raid at the home of businessman Adam Tamizi Haque for allegedly threatening Prime Minister Sheikh Hasina. A ruling Awami League leader had filed the case against him under the Cyber Security Act. The team left without making an arrest after Haque began a Facebook Live broadcast threatening suicide and claiming foreign citizenship. Ahmad said the raid was aimed at arresting Haque but that he was not taken into custody, adding that RAB had deployed forces so that Haque could surrender.

In early 2024, Ahmad led operations against teen gang members in Dhaka. He coordinated with the National Telecommunication Monitoring Centre to led raids against illegal Voice over Internet Protocol operators.
