= Freedom of the press in Bangladesh =

Freedom of the press in Bangladesh refers to the censorship and endorsement on public opinions, fundamental rights, freedom of expression, human rights, explicitly mass media such as the print, broadcast and online media as described or mentioned in the constitution of Bangladesh. The country's press is legally regulated by the certain amendments, while the sovereignty, national integrity and sentiments are generally protected by the law of Bangladesh to maintain a hybrid legal system for independent journalism and to protect fundamental rights of the citizens in accordance with secularism and media law. In Bangladesh, media bias and disinformation is restricted under the certain constitutional amendments as described by the country's post-independence constitution.

The Penal Code, one of the criminal codes deals with the media crime, which according to the law may be applicable to all substantive aspects of criminal law. The digital and offline communications such as print, television, radio, and internet are exercised under a set of provisions such as the Information and Communication Technologies Act, the Cyber Security Act and the Broadcast Act, which in particular deals with press-related issues, including arrest without warrant. It allows a journalist or media industries to publish news stories without impacting national security of the country.

== Global ranking ==
In 2020, Reporters Without Borders, a non-government organisations dedicated to safeguard independent journalism, published Press Freedom Index, an annual report indicating decline in press freedom of Bangladesh. The country's ranking dropped to 151 out of 180 following the persistent violations of human rights, involving alleged prosecutions, arrests of journalists and restricting media industries to access certain information, including elections. Bangladesh's press freedom ranking was primarily declined due to several other issues such as "violence by political activists", arbitrary blocking of news publishers, self-censorship, restricting some news media from attending government press conferences, arbitrary arrest and detention, physical attacks carried out against journalists by political activists, including by Awami League headed by Sheikh Hasina, 10th prime minister of Bangladesh in office since 2009. In 2018, the country's rank was 146.

== Censorship on press ==
The government of Bangladesh is claimed to have been involved in direct and self-censorship after introducing Digital Security Act in 2018 which has been a subject of dispute between government and non-government organisations. In 2020, the enforcement agencies detained at least 20 journalists along with 60 other people under the law for alleged social media posts.

A Bangladeshi journalist Shafiqul Islam Kajol who disappeared for 53 days after criticising sex trafficking by ruling political party's official was according to the human rights activists forcibly disappeared before he was sentenced seven years in jail under the Digital Security Act. Odhikar, a Bangladeshi human rights organisation, alleged the law has primarily been exercised by businessmen and politicians.

Bangladeshi authorities blocked 54 news websites, including opposition party's web portal and Al Jazeera, a foreign broadcaster over security issues. On 1 June 2018, the government also blocked the online edition of the Daily Star newspaper.

== Cult of personality ==
The leaders have consistently upheld the personality cult during the past election campaigns. The journalists and human rights activists in the country are argued to have experienced troubles since Awami League came into power. In 2018 general election, the opposition political partys' agents were restricted to attend the pooling stations. The violence between opposition and ruling political party activists killed at least 17 people. In June 2020, the authorities detained a 15 years old child for sharing a "defamatory" Facebook posts which according to the government was an attempt to defame Sheikh Hasina.

While supporting the regime, Bangladeshi media reports are often one-sided and exaggerated, playing little or no role in gathering true information. Although, fake news is regarded one of the media crimes, the government itself is argued engaged in spreading false information. Sometimes, only news that favours ruling parties is published by the government-sponsored media, whilst news that criticises government actions experience threats.

The government, according to news media is argued providing propaganda on its platform. The independent newspapers running in the country reportedly spread false information amid COVID-19 pandemic, leading detention of journalists.

== Persecution of journalists ==
During the Sheikh Hasina regime, from 2018 to 2023, law enforcement agencies and Awami League men have harassed and assaulted the relatives of journalists on multiple occasions.

In April 2020, some members of Bangladesh's military intelligence DGFI visited the house of Naznin Khalil, mother of the editor of Netra News, Tasneem Khalil to question her about her son's journalistic activities and allegedly banged the door when she refused to open.

In October 2021, the U.S.-sanctioned Bangladeshi force RAB raided the home of Nusrat Sarwar Raka, sister of exiled journalist Dr Kanak Sarwar in capital Dhaka and arrested her. Later, the police pressed two charges against her and locked her up in jail for almost a year.

In March 2023, Awami League's armed cadres, loyal to Sheikh Hasina beat the brother of Al-Jazeera I-Unit journalist Zulkarnain Saer Khan in front of his home in Dhaka. The attacker, while attacking, said, "Your brother writes against the prime minister, against the government? He's a journalist? Now you'll see." Zulkarnain Saer Khan exposed the corruption of Bangladesh Prime Minister Sheikh Hasina in the Al-Jazeera documentary All the Prime Minister's Men in 2022 and led an investigation against Sheikh Hasina's close aide Abdus Sobhan Golap's corruption who secretly bought nine properties of US$4 million in New York City.

After the resignation of Prime Minister Sheikh Hasina, a mob looted and vandalized the offices of ATN Bangla and ATN News forcing them to stop transmission. A mob also attacked the offices of Ekattor TV, Independent Television, and Somoy TV. Gaan Bangla TV was also vandalized. Mobs attacked and vandalized five to nine private television channels. A mob led by ATM Akram Hossain Talim, Bangladesh Nationalist Party politician, vandalized Bagerhat Press Club. Mourners outside Bangabandhu Memorial Museum were assaulted on 15 August and the media were prevent from documenting the incident. Talat Mahmud Rafi, the University of Chittagong coordinator of the quota movement warned the media about reporting on the movement and said it would take him less 15 seconds to finish them off on 18 August. He made the comments after media reported about five coordinators resigning from the movement at the university following a dispute with leadership.

The office of the president and general secretary of the Jatiya Press Club was vandalized and forcefully occupied after Abdul Hannan Masud of quota movement demanded their resignation and banning Awami League supporting journalists from the profession. The office of Shyamal Dutta of the Jatiya Press Club, National Press Club of Bangladesh, was vandalized and he was prevented from leaving Bangladesh. A mob attacked and vandalized Chittagong Press Club. Ruhul Quddus Talukder Dulu, leader of the Bangladesh Nationalist Party, threatened to burn down any TV or newspaper that showed video or photo of former prime minister Sheikh Hasina at a public rally of his party. On 18 August 2024, the offices of Kaler Kantho and Radio Capital were vandalized at the East West Media Group compound. About 25 vehicles in the media compound were damaged. Moniruzzaman Monir, President of Raipura Upazila press club and correspondent of Desh Rupantar, was shot after being physically assaulted on 13 August.

On 19 December 2025, Mobs attacked, vandalized, and set fire to the offices of Daily Prothom Alo and The Daily Star. As a result of the attack, both newspapers were not published on Friday, and their online operations were nearly paralyzed. Upon hearing the news, the chairman of the Editors’ Council and Nurul Kabir, editor of New Age, went to the offices and were harassed by the attackers. UN rapporteur Irene Khan described impunity under the Yunus government at the core of mob violence against media and stated that hundreds of journalists were arbitrarily detained for prolonged periods under "politically motivated" dubious charges after August 2024.

On 18 June 2026, Rezanur Islam, acting editor of Dainik Agrojatra Pratidin, was arrested by the Bogra Detective Branch in connection with a Cyber Security Act case filed after his newspaper published a report alleging corruption involving Mir Shahe Alam. A complaint was filed against six individuals associated with the publication, including its publisher, editors and reporters. PEN Bangladesh called for Islam's release stating that the right to investigate and report on matters of public interest is a key component of freedom of expression and public accountability and that such arrests and criminal charges would have a "chilling effect" on investigative journalism.

On 23 June 2026, Mahfuzur Rahman Shishir, a multimedia reporter for the daily Sokal, was assaulted following an anti-Awami League protest march at Dhanmondi 32 by Jamaat-e-Islami associates for trying to take statements from rally participants. The activists allegedly grabbed Shishir by the collar and punched him and kicked him. Jatiyatabadi Chhatra Dal protested what it termed a "barbaric, criminal-style attack and harassment" of journalists by Jamaat leaders and activists.

== See also ==
- 2024 Attacks in Bangladeshi Media
