= Tasneem Khalil =

Bangladeshi journalist

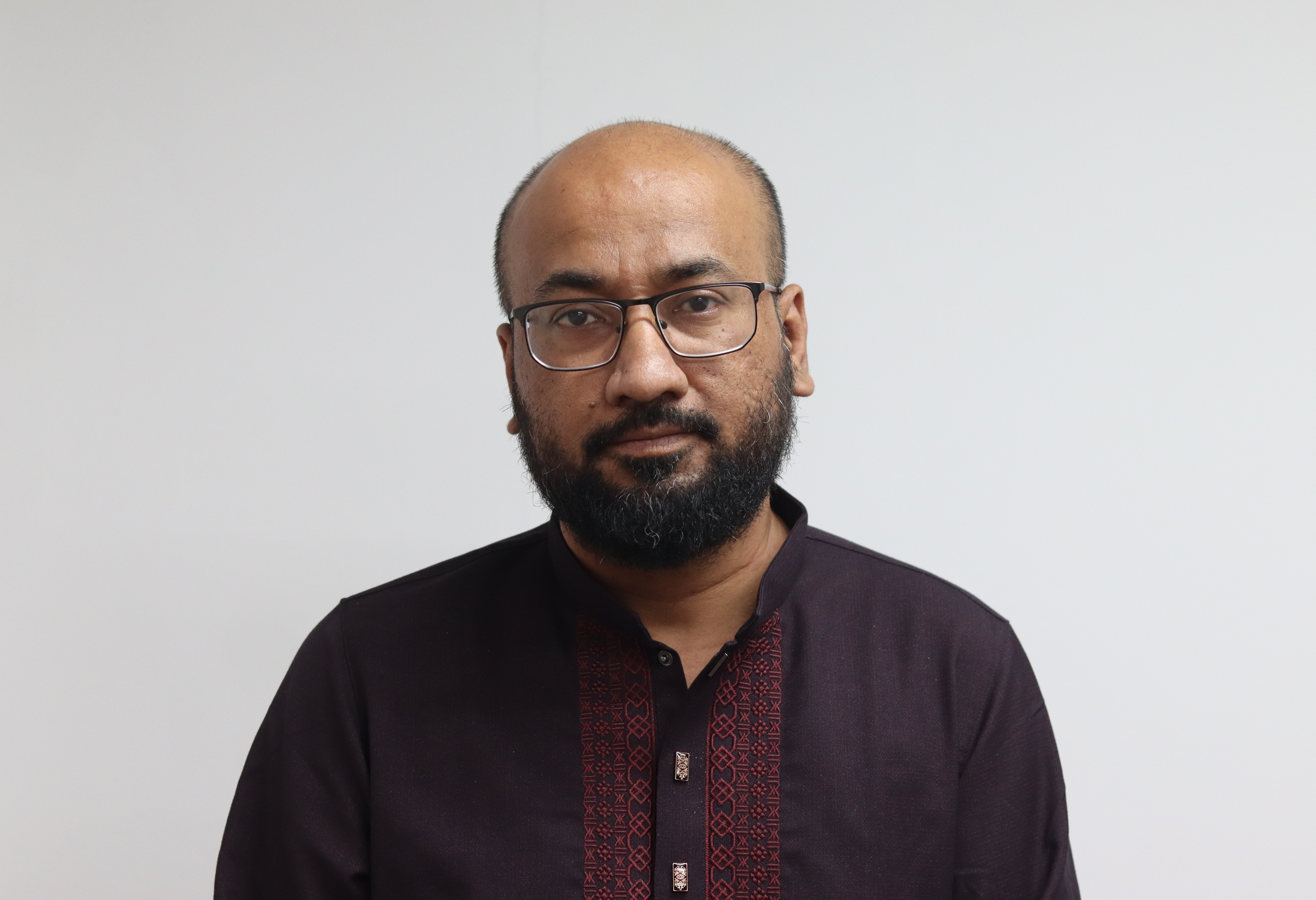
- Tasneem Khalil in 2026
- Born: ca. 1981
- Citizenship: Sweden
- Education: North South University, Bangladesh (Linguistics/English); Malmö University, Sweden (Human Rights)
- Occupations: Journalist, editor & publisher
- Years active: since 2000
- Employer(s): Independent World Report (current publisher & editor), The Daily Star (former Bangladesh journalist), CNN (former stringer)
- Organization: Human Rights Watch (consultant)
- Known for: Human rights reporting
- Spouse: Sharmin Afsana Suchi
- Children: Tiyash
- Website: tasneemkhalil.com

Tasneem Khalil is an exiled Bangladeshi journalist. He is editor in chief of Netra News. He previously worked for The Daily Star and was a stringer for CNN and a consultant for Human Rights Watch. During the 2006–2008 Bangladesh emergency, he was detained on 11 May 2007 and tortured while in the custody of Bangladesh's intelligence services. Khalil currently lives in Örebro, Sweden, where he is publisher and editor of Independent World Report, a world news magazine focused on human rights issues.

== Early history ==
Tasneem Khalil was born around 1981 in Bangladesh. While in Dhaka, Khalil studied English Linguistics at North South University. After his confinement in Bangladesh, he went into hiding for one month, and then on 6 June 2007 was able to escape via a major Bangladeshi airport. From there, he went into exile with his family and sought refuge in Sweden, a country he chose for its record on freedom of speech. Sweden granted him asylum in June 2007. He studied human rights at Malmö University in Malmö and started his own magazine while in Sweden. Khalil is married and the couple has one son, Tiyash.

== Journalism career ==
Tasneem Khalil was an editorial assistant with The Daily Star from 2000 to 2007. During this time he also wrote for Forum, which is a monthly magazine. He later became a stringer from Bangladesh for CNN and a consultant for Human Rights Watch in 2006. Khalil was active in his reporting and "prolific' in his blogging about human rights issues and violations, something his wife said would get him in trouble eventually.

After his confinement in Bangladesh and fleeing to Sweden, Khalil is the publisher and editor of Independent World Report, where he focuses on human rights topics in this subscription-based magazine. At Independent World Report, Khalil is providing dissidents with a means to communicate with the outside world:

The moment an individual signs up as a dissident journalist in China or a human-rights activist in Uzbekistan or a democracy activist in Burma he or she crosses a certain line, very much knowing what lies ahead. None of them have asked us to provide them with anonymity. They also want a global platform of human-rights journalism, and that is what we are trying to build.

== Arrest and torture ==
Dhaka is in Bangladesh.

Tasneem Khalil was taken into custody by four Bangladeshi army security officers, who were wearing plain clothing, from his home in Dhanmondi Thana, Dhaka, just after midnight 11 May 2007. His wife said officers came to their home and took her husband without an arrest warrant but on account of a state of emergency. While, the security force was at his home, they made a thorough search and confiscated his passport, computer and telephone equipment, and paper and electronic files used in his journalism work. Human Rights Watch believed he was detained for his human rights reporting and speaking out against the interim government in Bangladesh, and an editor at The Daily Star said the government had told him Khalil's detention was on account of his blogging at tasneemkhalil.com.

Khalil was not taken to the Dhanmondi Police Station in his area of the city but to the Sangsad Bhavan army camp and held there by the anti-corruption taskforce. During this arrest, he was blindfolded most of the time and beaten with 3 batons. He was questioned about his blogging on tasneemkhalil.com. He was also beaten because of an article he had written in Forum magazine. He was told to confess his crimes of being anti-interim government and working with CNN and Human Rights Watch in other countries as a spy. Khalil was released in front of the Hotel Sonogran within 22 hours of captivity, which is the shortest time anyone has been released from the Directorate General of Forces Intelligence, and a result of the pressure for his release from media outlets, press freedom organisations, and human rights organisations that mobilised on his behalf.

According to Brad Adams at Human Rights Watch, "Tasneem Khalil's prominence as a critical journalist may have prompted his arrest, but it also may have saved his life. Ordinary Bangladeshis held by the security forces under the emergency rules have no such protections."

=== Context ===
Tasneem Khalil was arrested under a state of emergency, that the Bangladesh interim government had ordered in 2007 to quell violence and to last between the time period that the Bangladesh Nationalist Party had surrendered control of the government until elections, in which the Bangladesh Awami League won at the end of 2008. Amnesty International quoted reports in Bangladesh that indicated around 100,000 people had been detained since the interim government took control. Khalil was told, he had been arrested for his personal blogs he had written which Bangladeshi security had deemed anti-Bangladeshi. Other journalists were also detained and tortured during this time period. These were journalists such as Noor Ahmed and Jahangir Alam Akash.

=== Reactions ===
After Tasneem Khalil's detention, his wife contacted a list of people she had been told to call and notify in case of emergency. The organisations, he worked for then provided assistance by publicising with the help of a blogger's network his captivity and urging governments to make inquiries into Khalil's situation. Brad Adams, Asia director of Human Rights Watch, said, "We are extremely concerned about Tasneem Khalil's safety. He has been a prominent voice in Bangladesh for human rights and the rule of law, and has been threatened because of that. The Bangladeshi military should be on notice that its actions are being closely watched by the outside world."

The South Asia Media Commission's coordinator Husain Naqi condemned the detention of Tasneem Khalil: "The Bangladeshi military should desist from such arbitrary actions which are being closely watched by the outside world. Any harm to Khalil will seriously chip away at the army’s claims to legitimacy and upholding the rule of law. The authorities should apologize for and call a halt to the pestering, which is an indication of the fragile state of press freedom in Bangladesh." Joel Simon, executive director of the Committee to Protect Journalists, said, "The apparent military arrest of such a prominent and well-respected journalist as Tasneem Khalil without any stated cause is an indication of the fragile state of press freedom in Bangladesh."

After his release in Bangladesh and fleeing the country, Khalil documented his experience in a Human Rights Watch report. Human Rights Watch has called its publication of The Torture of Tasneem Khalil (2008), which focuses on the above events, "the most detailed public account of a case of torture in Bangladesh."

== Charged under Digital Security Act ==
In 2020, Khalil along with 10 other people including cartoonist Ahmed Kabir Kishore and writer Mushtaq Ahmed were charged with "spreading rumours and carrying out anti-government activities" under the infamous Digital Security Act of Bangladesh.

== Selected writings ==
- Tasneem Khalil (25 September 2009). "Blood Cotton". Independent World Report. Archived from the original on 4 October 2009.
- Tasneem Khalil, "Surviving torture in Bangladesh", New York Times, 2 March 2008.
- Tasneem Khalil, "Modhupur: Wherever the forest department is, there is no forest", The Forum, volume 2, issue 3, March 2007.
- Abrahams, Fred (13 December 2006). Judge, Jury, and Executioner: Torture and Extrajudicial Killings by Bangladesh’s Elite Security Force. Human Rights Watch (Report).
