= Cyber Security Act, 2023 =

Jatiya Sangsad
- Long title: An Act to ensure digital security and to identify, prevent, suppress, and prosecute offences committed through digital devices.
- Citation: Act No. 46 of 2023
- Territorial extent: Bangladesh
- Enacted by: Jatiya Sangsad
- Enacted: 13 September 2023
- Assented to: 13 September 2023
- Commenced: 13 September 2023
- Repealed: 21 May 2025
- Administered by: Ministry of Posts, Telecommunications and Information Technology

Amends
- Digital Security Act, 2018

Repealed by
- Cyber Security Ordinance, 2025

Summary
- The Act aimed to enhance digital security by addressing cyber crimes, replacing the Digital Security Act, 2018. It faced criticism for retaining controversial provisions that were seen as suppressing freedom of expression.
- Status: Repealed

The Cyber Security Act, 2023 was a digital security law enacted in Bangladesh, replacing the Digital Security Act, 2018. Amnesty International described it as a replication of the "draconian" Digital Security Act.

== History ==
The Cyber Security Act, 2023 was passed by the Parliament of Bangladesh in September 2023 with provisions for punishing those filing fake cases under the act. It contains most of the provisions of Digital Security Act, 2018 and Section 57 of the Information and Communication Technology Act, 2006. Amnesty International said it does not comply with "international human rights law". The law renamed Digital Security Agency to Cyber Security Agency.

Transparency International Bangladesh and Article 19 have been critical of the law and its impact on the citizens of Bangladesh.

During the Quota reforms protests, the law was used to file cases against those posting negative posts about then Prime Minister Sheikh Hasina. After the resignation of Prime Minister Sheikh Hasina, Bangladesh Association of Software and Information Services and Forum for Freedom of Expression Bangladesh called for the act to be repealed in August 2024.

On May 22, 2025, The interim government repealed the Cyber Security Act, 2023 and introduced the Cyber Security Ordinance, 2025.
