= Ahmed Kabir Kishore =

Bangladeshi cartoonist

- আহমেদ কবীর কিশোর
- Born: 30 May 1974 (age 52)
- Occupation: Cartoonist

Ahmed Kabir Kishore (Bengali: আহমেদ কবির কিশোর; born 30 May 1974) is a Bangladeshi cartoonist. He was accused of drawing cartoons and was held in pre-trial detention in Bangladesh under the country's infamous Digital Security Act for 10 months since May 2, 2020. His detention and reports of custodial torture drew concern and criticism from Cartoonists Rights Network International, Cartooning for Peace, other international organizations, and members of the Bangladeshi public.

== Biography ==
Kishore's parents are AKM Mozammel Huq and Begum Kohinoor Huq. Mozammel Huque was a deputy general manager of Bangladesh Jute Mills Corporation, an artist, actor, voice artist and a writer as well. He incepted a new cultural activity just after independence war through publishing literature magazines. Kishore learnt how to draw from his father and brother. He completed his SSC at Crescent High School and HSC at BL College. He enrolled in the Department of Architecture at BUET but did not finish his studies. Kishore later joined the Bangladesh Bangladesh Navy as an officer cadet, was promoted to midshipman, and was withdrawn from the academy for protesting corporal punishment four days before the passing-out parade. He received the "Captain’s Cake" award for excellence in arts and crafts and earned a BSc from the Naval Academy. He also completed an MDP course at IBA, University of Dhaka, and studied governance under the Department of Political Science at Dhaka University (2015–16 session), completing up to the third semester.

=== Cartoons and activism ===
Kishore contributed cartoons to several humor periodicals, including "Khobor Ache" of Daily Manobjomin, "Alpin" of Prothom Alo, "Bhimrul" of Amar Desh and "Bicchu" of Daily Jugantor. His first job as a cartoonist was in the noted Bangladeshi weekly Bichitra.Then he joined in the daily Prothom Alo as a contributing cartoonist and later joined the Daily Amar Desh as an editorial cartoonist.

Kishore is identified as a Cartoonist Rights Network International (CRNI) "affiliate leader" in Bangladesh for his decade-long work as a cartoonist and activist. He campaigned for jailed Bangladeshi cartoonist Arifur Rahman (2007) and the disappeared Sri Lankan cartoonist Prageeth Eknaligoda (2010). He worked for human rights, Third gender people, health and consumer rights and the Bengali language.

During March and April 2020, Kishore drew several cartoons criticizing and satirizing the Bangladesh Government's handling of COVID-19 pandemic and posted it in his Facebook timeline with the title "Life in the Time of Corona". In 2020, he also drew a satirical cartoon mocking the chairman of a private bank, a powerful businessman with close ties to the government of Bangladesh.

=== Detention and torture ===
Kishore and his elder friend writer Mushtaq Ahmed were arrested in May, 2020 in Dhaka under the Digital Security Act by Rapid Action Battalion (RAB) unit-3. Kishore, along with ten others, was accused of “spreading rumours” about Sheikh Mujibur Rahman, the Bangladesh Liberation War, and the government’s handling of the COVID-19 pandemic, allegedly with the intent to create confusion and unrest. While authorities claimed he was detained on 5 May from Kakrail, Kishore stated he had been picked up on 2 May from his Shantinagar residence by plainclothes officers. Mushtaq Ahmed was accused of criticizing the government’s COVID-19 response. Others charged included activist Didarul Islam Bhuiyan of the platform Rastrachinta and Swedish-Bangladeshi journalist Tasneem Khalil, editor of Netra News. Among other accused were Didarul Islam Bhuiyan, an activist of a platform called 'Rastrachinta' and Swedish-Bangladeshi journalist Tasneem Khalil, editor of Netra News. Police complaints also linked Kishore’s cartoons, including the Life in the Time of Corona series, and the Facebook page "I am Bangladeshi", to alleged attempts at tarnishing the country’s image."

In March 2021, Kishore testified in court and told journalists that he had been tortured in custody between 2 and 5 May, including beatings with a steel rod, head injuries that ruptured an eardrum, and denial of food and insulin despite his diabetes.He displayed ear and leg injuries to reporters from The Daily Star and Prothom Alo. According to his brother, Kishore required surgery on his ear and eye, and treatment for his nose, throat, and leg after release on bail. RAB denied the allegations of torture, with its media wing director Ashique Billah describing Kishore’s statements as those of “an aggrieved person.

=== Reaction of detention ===
Human Rights Watch, PEN America, UN High Commissioner for Human Rights and 13 OECD countries condemned the arrest, and torture of Kishore and Mushtaq. They also urged the Government of Bangladesh to release Kishore. Nine international organizations: AFAD, FORUM-ASIA, AHRC, ANFREL, CIVICUS, Eleos Justice - Monash University, FIDH, OMCT and Robert F Kennedy Human Rights in a joint statement called for investigations of the allegation of torture on Kishore.

=== Bail ===
Kishore and Mushtaq were denied bail 6 times by the lower court of Bangladesh during the 10 months period they were detained under the Digital Security Act. Mushtaq died inside Kashimpur High Security Prison on February 25, 2021, at the age of 53. After the death of Ahmed, people of Bangladesh protested in the streets of Dhaka. A panel of high court judges granted Kishore bail on March 3, 2021. Kishore got out of the prison on March 5, 2021, and told the journalists in detail how he was tortured by Rapid Action Battalion. Editors' council of Bangladesh in a joint statement asked for dropping all the charges against Kishore. On March 10, 2021, Kishore filed a complaint with a Dhaka court recounting his experiences of torture.

== Cartoonists Rights Network Bangladesh (CRNB) ==
On 24 February 2010, the Cartoonists Rights Network Bangladesh (CRNB) was officially inaugurated at Dhaka University’s Teacher–Student Centre. The launch featured a street exhibition of cartoons and public awareness activities focusing on food adulteration and the preservation of the Bengali language. Organizers, including Kishore, distributed leaflets and urged authorities to take stronger action against corrupt food practices, marking the network’s formal entry into activism through cartooning.

== In the media ==
Kishore’s case has been covered internationally as an example of declining press freedom in Bangladesh. A 2022 Nieman Reports article described his detention under the Digital Security Act and alleged torture as part of a wider crackdown on political cartoonists and journalists. The Globe and Mail similarly reported that despite his detention and alleged torture, he continued producing cartoons and activism, highlighting his resilience and commitment to free expression. In 2023, The Guardian linked his experience of arrest and alleged torture to a broader government crackdown on opposition voices in Bangladesh.

== Books ==
- Bhalobashar Chhoragolpo, Jagriti Publications, 2006
- Kishore er Nirbachito Chushil Cartoon, Amar Prokashoni, 2012
- Bangladesher Cartoon, Cartooner Bangladesh, Shrabon Prokashoni, 2012 - the only publication ever on such topic
- Deyaler Golpo, Priomukh Prokashoni, 2016 - compilation of short stories

== Awards ==
In 2020, Kishore received the Robert Russell Courage in Cartooning Award as a recognition of his "social engagement and defence of human rights". Kishore also received the first Unmad medal from Unmad, a sole cartoon magazine published from Dhaka, Bangladesh.

== See also ==
- Human rights in Bangladesh
