= Jatiya Sangsad (Reserved Women Seats) Election Act, 2004 =

Jatiya Sangsad (Reserved Women Seats) Election Act, 2004 was an act of the Jatiya Sangshad, the parliament of Bangladesh, passed in 2004, creating reserved seats in the parliament of Bangladesh for women.

== History ==
The original constitution of Bangladesh in 1972 reserved 15 seats for women in the Jatiya Sangshad for the first ten years. This was increased to 30 seats in 1979 through the fifth amendment to the Constitution of Bangladesh for the next 15 years. The reserved seats expired in 1988 and no steps were taken to replace them. The tenth amendment to the Constitution of Bangladesh increased the reserved seats to 30 for ten more years in 1990. The provision expired in 2001.

The 14th amendment to the Constitution of Bangladesh was passed on 17 May 2004 that increased the reserved seats to 45.

Moudud Ahmed, Minister of Law of the Bangladesh Nationalist Party, wrote the bill in 2004. The bill would create 45 additional seats reserved for women. They would be distributed to political parties proportional to the number of seats they hold in the parliament. The number would be calculated using a formula and decided by the Election Commission. The move was criticized by the Awami League and the Jatiya Party as being unconstitutional. They called for the women to be elected to the reserved seats rather than appointed.

In January 2005, Justice M. A. Matin and Justice Abdur Rahman of the Bangladesh Supreme Court placed an injunction on holding the polls to reserved seat while it heard three petitions challenging the constitutionality of the act. The petition was filed by a group of women activists including Sigma Huda, Naila Z Khan, Tasneem Siddiqui, and Farida Akhter. The parliament passed an amendment as it failed to hold the election in 45 days extending the deadline.

In September 2005, 36 women members of parliament joined the Jatiya Sangshad under the reservation while the opposition Awami League choose to nominate no-one for their allocated nine reserved seats.

The 2008, Awami League manifesto promised to increased the number of reserved seats for women. In 2009, for the first time women from reserved seats were elected parliament already held the inaugural session. On 30 June 2011, the 15th amendment to the Constitution of Bangladesh was passed which increased the reserved seats from 45 to 50.

In September 2023, the parliament of Bangladesh passed the Jatiya Sangsad (Women Reserved Seat) Election (Amendment) Bill, 2023. The amendment increased the security deposit of candidates from ten thousand taka to 20 thousand taka. It increased the time to hold by-elections to reserved seats from 45 to 90 days. The draft was first approved by the Election Commission.
