= Mushtaq Ahmed (writer) =

Bangladeshi dissident, writer, and entrepreneur (1967–2021)

- মুশতাক আহমেদ
- Ahmed in 2020
- Born: 5 December 1967; Chuadanga District, East Pakistan, Pakistan
- Died: February 25, 2021 (aged 53); Gazipur District, Bangladesh
- Occupations: Writer, entrepreneur

Mushtaq Ahmed (Bengali: মুশতাক আহমেদ; 5 December 1967 – 25 February 2021), popularly known as Kumir Bhai, was a Bangladeshi dissident, writer, and entrepreneur. His pen name was Michael Kumir Thakur. He founded the first ever commercial Crocodile breeding farm in Bangladesh. His book Kumir Chashir Diary was published in 2018. He was working on another book. He was accused with 10 others of sharing cartoons in social media posts criticizing the Bangladeshi government's corrupt and mismanaged response to COVID-19 pandemic and was detained in pre-trial for almost a year. On 25 February 2021 he died in jail, after being denied bail 6 times.

He was the first "martyr" of the notorious 2018 Digital Security Act.

== Personal life ==
Ahmed passed the SSC and HSC examination from Faujdarhat Cadet College. He then attended the University of Chittagong. Ahmed was married to Masiha Akhter Lipa. He has two sisters.

Mushtaq Ahmed was an activist and used to write Facebook posts about contemporary socio-political issues. In one of his Facebook posts before his arrest in May 2020, Ahmed expressed his frustration about COVID-19 pandemic management by Bangladesh Government and wrote, "When a society laments the loss of an economy more than the loss of human life, it doesn't need a virus, it's already sick."

== Arrest and death ==
=== Arrest ===
On 6 May 2020, around 1:00am, Rapid Action Battalion-3 arrested Ahmed from his home in Dhaka for criticising the Bangladesh government's handling of the COVID-19 pandemic in 10 Facebook posts and links. After 8 months, he was charged under the notorious 2018 Digital Security Act, though the act allows a maximum 105 days for completing investigation and submitting charges. Digital Security Act is alleged to be used in Bangladesh to crack down on political dissent. Around 2000 cases have been filed from 2018 to the beginning of 2021 under Digital Security Act.

Six civilians, including security guards of houses and malls, peon and relatives, have been made witnesses of the case against Ahmed, but five of them told Prothom Alo that they didn't give any such testimony to the police.

=== Detention ===
For the whole 9 months, from Ahmed's arrest to his death, his family was not able to meet him. Visit to prison was not allowed due to the pandemic. Two days before his death, the prosecution produced him before the court for bail hearing, only to be denied bail. In all, his bail appeals were denied six times. His wife started suffering from mental illness when bail was denied for the fourth time and needed hospitalization. Human rights organizations around the world decried his arrest and prolonged detention without trial, without bail. Mahfuz Anam, Editor and Publisher, The Daily Star, wrote, "writer Mushtaq was condemned and his punishment implemented without the minimum due process of law being available to him."

=== Death ===
In an interview with The Daily Star, cartoonist Ahmed Kabir Kishore, Ahmed's co-accused, revealed that Ahmed was tortured in custody. Ahmed died on 25 February 2021, after collapsing in Kashimpur High Security Jail with low blood pressure. He was first taken to Jail hospital and later to Shaheed Tajuddin Medical College Hospital where the doctor pronounced him dead on arrival. According to the postmortem report, Mushtaq died naturally even though Mushtaq's lawyer and Mushtaq's co-accused Kishore claimed that Mushtaq was tortured. According to Mushtaq's lawyer Mushtaq was held in prison for nine months and denied bail despite being in poor health. He was buried at Azimpur graveyard.

After his death, in an interview with Prothom Alo, senior jail superintendent Md Gias Uddin said that Mushtaq Ahmed was very gentle and quiet. He was a good person. He did not complain about any issues. Ahmed read books about history and other subjects in prison. Gias Uddin also confirmed that Mushtaq was not suffering from any major illness. "We saw him taking only gastric tablets" he told journalists.

== Reactions ==
=== Domestic ===
Ahmed's death sparked widespread protests across the country demanding justice, repeal of the Digital Security Act and release of all detainees under the act. During the march of 300 protesters at the University of Dhaka and at the National Press Club, security forces clashed with them. The students were chanting "justice" near the Dhaka University campus when police lashed out with batons and fired rubber bullets and tear gas rounds. Thirty activists were injured during the clash and six people were arrested by police. Journalists, civil society and many political parties including the Bangladesh Nationalist Party termed his death as state sponsored murder. Bangladesh's National Human Rights Commission said the state cannot avoid responsibility for the death which is a gross violation of human rights.

Responding to a query on Ahmed's death, the Prime Minister of Bangladesh - Sheikh Hasina, counter questioned, "What can be done if someone falls ill and dies?". "No death is desired. It is also not desired that unrest will be created", she added.

Asaduzzaman Khan Kamal, Home Minister of Bangladesh told journalists that Mushtaq Ahmed violated the law and there were cases against him. He also alleged that Mushtaq Ahmed hurt the faiths of others through his writing several times.

=== International ===
United Nations (UN) High Commissioner for Human Rights Michelle Bachelet urged independent investigation into Ahmed's death and overhaul of Digital Security Act. Thirteen diplomatic mission heads in Bangladesh - including France, the UK and the US, called on the Government of Bangladesh to conduct a swift and transparent inquiry into his death. They questioned Digital Security Act's compatibility with Bangladesh's obligations under international human rights laws and standards. Nine international human rights organizations have urged the Bangladesh government to repeal the Digital Security Act. They asked the UN to review Bangladesh's security forces' and law-enforcement agencies' participation in UN Peacekeeping Operations, given their concerning record of human rights abuses.

"Ahmed's death has sent a chill through Bangladesh civil society and should force the government into ending this peremptory treatment of peaceful criticism," said Brad Adams, Asia director of Human Rights Watch. "Posting satire about the ruling Awami League on Facebook should not amount to the equivalent of a death sentence", he added.

Aliya Iftikhar, Committee to Protect Journalists's senior Asia researcher said, "Mushtaq Ahmed's death in a Bangladeshi prison, where he never should have been detained in the first place, is a devastating and unconscionable loss".

The International Federation of Journalists general secretary, Anthony Bellanger, said, "We stand in solidarity with our colleagues in Bangladesh as they mourn the loss of Mushtaq Ahmed. This writer should have never been imprisoned let alone die in a high-security jail. This is a crime against freedom of expression. The long list of incarcerations against journalists and activists is evidence enough that The DSA must be urgently repealed."

Global association of writers, PEN International, demanded an independent and transparent investigation into writer Mushtaq's death in custody and also urged the Bangladesh government to immediately repeal the Digital Security Act.

== Aftermath ==
On the sixth day of continued protests, cartoonist Kishore was granted bail, 10 months after his arrest. He was released from jail the next day.
