= List of acts of the Parliament of Sri Lanka, 2010–present =

This is a chronological list of acts passed by the Parliament of Sri Lanka, 2010–present:

== Summary ==
Year	Acts	Amendments	Incorporations	Repeals	Constitutional Amendments	Others	Total
2010	7	5	5	-	1	3	21
2011	22	19	9	1	-	1	52
2012	10	8	4	-	-	1	23
2013	18	16	-	1	-	1	36
2014	5	21	19	1	-	1	47
2015	3	9	1	1	1	-	15
2016	9	14	-	-	-	1	24
2017	8	23	-	-	-	1	32
Total	82	115	38	4	2	9	250

== 2010–present ==
=== 13th Parliament ===
==== 2010 ====
No.	#	Act	Certified	Text
1/2010		Sri Lanka Chamber of Small Industry (Incorporation) (Amendment) Act 2010	13 January	
2/2010		Wariyapola Rajamaha Vihara Development Foundation (Incorporation) Act 2010	21 January	
3/2010		Hampton Village Sri Lanka Trust (Incorporation) Act 2010	9 February	
4/2010		Siriniwes Prajamithra Sahayogitha Kendraya (Incorporation) Act 2010	9 February	
5/2010		Maligawatta Janaza and Welfare Society (Incorporation) Act 2010	9 February	
6/2010		Pulathisi Daruwo Foundation Trust (Incorporation) Act 2010	9 February	

=== 14th Parliament ===
==== 2010 ====
No.	#	Act	Certified	Text
7/2010	1	Appropriation Act 2010	13 July	
8/2010	2	Widows' and Orphans' Pension fund (Amendment) Act 2010	17 August	
9/2010	3	Widowers' and Orphans' Pension (Amendment) Act 2010	17 August	
10/2010	4	Judicature (Amendment) Act 2010	18 August	
00/2010	5	18th Amendment to the Constitution	9 September	
11/2010	6	Civil Procedure Code (Amendment) Act 2010	5 October	
12/2010	7	National Institute of Labour Act Act 2010	6 October	
13/2010	8	Provincial Council Act 2010	30 October	
14/2010	9	Civil Aviation Act 2010	3 November	
15/2010	10	Secretary to the Treasury (Nomination of Representative) Act 2010	7 December	
16/2010	11	Default Taxes (Special Provisions) Act 2010	7 December	
17/2010	12	Casino Business (Regulation) Act 2010	7 December	
18/2010	13	Public Enterprises Reform Commission of Sri Lanka Act 2010	7 December	
19/2010	14	Registration of Deaths Act 2010	10 December	
20/2010	15	Appropriation Act 2010	10 December	

==== 2011 ====
No.	#	Act	Certified	Text
1/2011	16	Recovery of Loans by Banks Act 2011	28 January	
2/2011	17	Offensive Weapons Act 2011	28 January	
3/2011	18	Regulation of Insurance Industry (Amendment) Act 2011	7 February	
4/2011	19	Mediation Boards (Amendment) Act 2011	23 February	
5/2011	20	Protection of the Rights of Elders (Amendment) Act 2011	23 February	
6/2011	21	Rohitha Abeygunawardana Foundation (Incorporation) Act 2011	23 February	
7/2011	22	Tharunyata Hetak Organization (Incorporation) Act 2011	23 February	
8/2011	23	Red Lotus Organization for Humanitarian Services (Incorporation) Act 2011	22 March	
9/2011	24	Value Added Tax (Amendment) Act 2011	31 March	
10/2011	25	Nation Building Tax (Amendment) Act 2011	31 March	
11/2011	26	Economic Service Charge Act 2011	31 March	
12/2011	27	Strategic Development Project Act 2011	31 March	
13/2011	28	Provincial Councils (Transfer of Stamp duty) Act 2011	31 March	
14/2011	29	Debits Tax Act 2011	31 March	
15/2011	30	Finance (Amendment) Act 2011	31 March	
16/2011	31	Regional Infrastructure Development Levy (Repeal) Act 2011	31 March	
17/2011	32	Excise (Special Provisions) (Amendment) Act 2011	31 March	
18/2011	33	Ports and Airports Development Levy Act 2011	31 March	
19/2011	34	Recovery of Loans by Banks (Special Provisions) (Amendment) Act 2011	31 March	
20/2011	35	Excise (Amendment) Act 2011	31 March	
21/2011	36	Telecommunication Levy Act 2011	31 March	
22/2011	37	Inland Revenue (Amendment) Act 2011	31 March	
23/2011	38	Tax Appeals Commission Act 2011	31 March	
24/2011	39	Sri Lanka Samata Setha Foundation (Incorporation) Act 2011	6 April	
25/2011	40	Pina Organisation (Incorporation) Act 2011	3 May	
26/2011	41	Census (Amendment) Act 2011	6 May	
27/2011	42	Maheswary Foundation (Incorporation) Act 2011	25 May	
28/2011	43	Elections Act 2011	25 May	
29/2011	44	Food Act 2011	7 June	
30/2011	45	Pradeshiya Sanwardena Bank Act 2011	7 June	
31/2011	46	Control of Pesticides Act 2011	23 June	
32/2011	47	Navy (Amendment) Act 2011	24 June	
33/2011	48	Sri Lanka Economic Association Act 2011	19 July	
34/2011	49	Anuradhapura Sri Puspadana Development Foundation (Incorporation) Act 2011	22 August	
35/2011	50	Pahalagama Sri Somarathana Nayaka Thero Foundation (Incorporation) Act 2011	23 August	
36/2011	51	Lester James Peries & Sumithra Peries Foundation Act 2011	23 August	
37/2011	52	Olangala Maha Sudarshana Paropakari Foundation Act 2011	23 August	
38/2011	53	Institute of Applied Statistics, Sri Lanka (Incorporation) Act 2011	20 September	
39/2011	54	Industrial Dispute (Amendment) Act 2011	6 October	
40/2011	55	Prevention Of Money Laundering Act 2011	6 October	
41/2011	56	Convention of the suppression of Terrorism Financing (Amendment) Act 2011	6 October	
42/2011	57	Finance Business Act 2011	9 November	
43/2011	58	Revival of Underperforming Enterprises or underutilized Assets Act 2011	11 November	
44/2011	59	National Police Academy Act 2011	21 November	
45/2011	60	Housing Development Finance Corporation Bank of Sri Lanka (Amendment) Act 2011	21 November	
46/2011	61	Agrarian Development Act (Amendment) Act 2011	22 November	
47/2011	62	Notaries (Amendment) Act 2011	24 November	
48/2011	63	Registration of documents (Amendment) Act 2011	24 November	
49/2011	64	Coast Conservation Act 2011	30 November	
50/2011	65	Buddhist Cultural Center of Nedimala Dehiwala (Incorporation) (Amendment) Act 2011	30 November	
51/2011	66	Sri Dhammalankara Social Services Act 2011	16 December	
52/2011	67	Appropriation Act 2011	21 December	

==== 2012 ====
No.	#	Act	Certified	Text
1/2012	68	Ramakrishna Sarada Mission (Incorporation) Act 2012	17 January	
2/2012	69	Employee's Provident Fund Act 2012	9 February	
3/2012	70	Board of Investment of Sri Lanka (Amendment) Act 2012	15 February	
4/2012	71	Tax Appeals Commission Act 2012	15 February	
5/2012	72	Central Colleges Past Pupils' Association of Sri Lanka (Incorporation) Act 2012	21 February	
6/2012	73	Rahula College Matara Act 2012	8 March	
7/2012	74	Value Added Tax Act 2012	30 March	
8/2012	75	Inland Revenue (Amendment) Act 2012	30 March	
9/2012	76	Nation Building Tax (Amendment) Act 2012	30 March	
10/2012	77	Ports and Airport Act 2012	30 March	
11/2012	78	Economic Service Charge (Amendment) Act 2012	30 March	
12/2012	79	Finance Act 2012	30 March	
13/2012	80	Defence Services Command and Staff College (Amendment) Act 2012	4 May	
14/2012	81	T. B. Ekanayake Foundation (Incorporation) Act 2012	6 June	
15/2012	82	Buddhasravaka Bikku University (Amendment) Act 2012	11 July	
16/2012	83	Organization for the Erection of Balana Buddha Statue (Incorporation) Act 2012	6 August	
17/2012	84	D. M. Dasanayake Social Service and Charity Foundation Act 2012	6 August	
18/2012	85	Dr. Malani Fonseka Foundation Act 2012	6 August	
19/2012	86	Piya Dasuna Foundation Act 2012	6 August	
20/2012	87	Ranaviru Seva Authority (Amendment) Act 2012	8 October	
21/2012	88	Local Authority (Special) Act 2012	15 November	
22/2012	89	Local Authority Election (Amendment) Act 2012	15 November	
23/2012	90	Appropriation Act 2012	8 December	

==== 2013 ====
No.	#	Act	Certified	Text
1/2013	91	Divinaguma Act 2013	11 January	
2/2013	92	Code of Criminal Procedure Act 2013	6 February	
3/2013	93	Convention of the suppression of Terrorist Financing Act 2013	12 February	
4/2013	94	Society of the Ceylonese Brother's of St. Joseph Act 2013	21 February	
5/2013	95	Ports and Airports Developments Levy (Amendment) Act 2013	22 March	
6/2013	96	Economic Service Charge (Amendment) Act 2013	22 March	
7/2013	97	Excise (Amendment) Act 2013	22 March	
8/2013	98	Telecommunication Levy (Amendment) Act 2013	22 March	
9/2013	99	Customs (Amendment) Act 2013	22 March	
10/2013	100	Resettlement Authority (Amendment) Act 2013	28 March	
11/2013	101	Nation Building Act 2013	23 April	
12/2013	102	Finance Act Act 2013	23 April	
13/2013	103	Notaries (Amendment) Act 2013	23 April	
14/2013	104	Powers of Attorney Act 2013	23 April	
15/2013	105	Fiscal Management (Responsibility) (Amendment) Act 2013	23 April	
16/2013	106	Strategic Development Projects Act 2013	23 April	
17/2013	107	Value Added Tax Act 2013	24 April	
18/2013	108	Inland Revenue Act 2013	24 April	
19/2013	109	Betting and Gaming Levy (Amendment) Act 2013	24 April	
20/2013	110	Tax Appeals Commission Act 2013	24 April	
21/2013	111	Registration of Documents Act 2013	24 April	
22/2013	112	Marriage Registration (Amendment) Act 2013	8 May	
23/2013	113	Kandyan Marriage and Divorce Act 2013	8 May	
24/2013	114	Muslim Marriage and Divorce (Amendment) Act 2013	8 May	
25/2013	115	Births and Deaths Registration Act 2013	8 May	
26/2013	116	Hanguranketha Madanwala Rajamaha Vihara Development Foundation Act 2013	21 May	
27/2013	117	Registration of Electors (Special Provisions) Act 2013	20 June	
28/2013	118	Parliamentary Scholarship Board (Repeal) Act 2013	8 July	
29/2013	119	Defence Services Command and Staff College (Amendment) Act 2013	8 July	
30/2013	120	Local Authorities filling of vacancies Act 2013	12 July	
31/2013	121	Sri Lanka Electricity (Amendment) Act 2013	7 August	
32/2013	122	Science and Technology Development (Amendment) Act 2013	25 October	
33/2013	123	Convention Against Doping in Sport Act 2013	11 November	
34/2013	124	Buddhist Temporalities (Amendment) Act 2013	11 November	
35/2013	125	Fisheries and Aquatic Resources (Amendment) Act 2013	22 November	
36/2013	126	Appropriation Act 2013	20 December	

==== 2014 ====
No.	#	Act	Certified	Text
1/2014	127	Institute of Policy Studies of Sri Lanka (Amendment) Act 2014	6 February	
2/2014	128	National Institute of Business Management (Amendment) Act 2014	21 February	
3/2014	129	Institute of Geology, Sri Lanka (Incorporation) Act 2014	4 March	
4/2014	130	Philip Gunawardena Commemorative Society (Incorporation) Act 2014	4 March	
5/2014	131	Chandima Weerakkody Foundation (Incorporation) Act 2014	4 March	
6/2014	132	Medical (Amendment) Act 2014	10 April	
7/2014	133	Value Added Tax Act 2014	24 April	
8/2014	134	Inland Revenue (Amendment) Act 2014	24 April	
9/2014	135	Economic Service Charge (Amendment) Act 2014	24 April	
10/2014	136	Nation Building Tax (Amendment) Act 2014	24 April	
11/2014	137	Telecommunication Levy (Amendment) Act 2014	24 April	
12/2014	138	Special Commodity Levy (Amendment) Act 2014	24 April	
13/2014	139	Companies Act (Amendment) Act 2014	24 April	
14/2014	140	Default Taxes (Special Provisions) (Amendment) Act 2014	24 April	
15/2014	141	Monetary Law (Amendment) Act 2014	24 April	
16/2014	142	Samastha Lanka Sasanarakshaka Mandalaya (Incorporation) Act 2014	24 April	
17/2014	143	The Rehabilitation of Buddhist Temples Foundation (Incorporation) Act 2014	24 April	
18/2014	144	National Enterprise Development Authority (Amendment) Act 2014	4 June	
19/2014	145	Kumarasiri Hettige Foundation (Incorporation) Act 2014	17 June	
20/2014	146	Mohan Lal Grero Foundation (Incorporation) Act 2014	17 June	
21/2014	147	Victor Antony Foundation (Incorporation) Act 2014	17 June	
22/2014	148	Dampe, Meegoda, Bodhiwardhanarama Sri Madurasama Pirivena Viharastha Sanwardhana Sabhawa (Incorporation) Act 2014	23 July	
23/2014	149	Nimal Siripala De Silva Foundation (Incorporation) Act 2014	23 July	
24/2014	150	Lakshman Wasantha Perera Community Development Foundation (Incorporation) Act 2014	23 July	
25/2014	151	Institute of Fundamental Studies, Sri Lanka (Amendment) Act 2014	8 August	
26/2014	152	Prescription (Amendment) Act 2014	8 August	
27/2014	153	John Seneviratne Foundation (Incorporation) Act 2014	20 August	
28/2014	154	Bodirajarama Educational and Cultural Foundation (Incorporation) Act 2014	21 August	
29/2014	155	Vasantha Senanayake Foundation (Incorporation) Act 2014	21 August	
30/2014	156	Roman Catholic Archbishop and Bishops of Ceylon (Amendment) Act 2014	21 August	
31/2014	157	Ocean University of Sri Lanka Act 2014	7 September	
32/2014	158	Piyasena Gamage Foundation (Incorporation) Act 2014	7 September	
33/2014	159	Construction Industry Development Act 2014	16 October	
34/2014	160	Municipal Councils (Amendment) Act 2014	23 October	
35/2014	161	Urban Councils (Amendment) Act 2014	23 October	
36/2014	162	Pradeshiya Sabhas (Amendment) Act 2014	23 October	
37/2014	163	Local Authorities filling of vacancies (Special Provisions) (Amendment) Act 2014	23 October	
38/2014	164	Land (Restrictions on Alienation) Act 2014	29 October	
39/2014	165	DFCC Bank (Repeal and Consequential Provisions) Act 2014	1 November	
40/2014	166	Sri Lanka Atomic Energy Act 2014	4 November	
41/2014	167	Appropriation Act 2014	24 November	
42/2014	168	Kalpawaruksha Development Foundation (Incorporation) Act 2014	24 November	
43/2014	169	Sivmuni Se Vehera Buddhist Foundation (Incorporation) Act 2014	24 November	
44/2014	170	P. Harrison Community Development Foundation (Incorporation) Act 2014	24 November	
45/2014	171	Welfare Society of the School for the Mentally Subnormal Child (Incorporation) (Amendment) Act 2014	24 November	
46/2014	172	Sri Lanka Association of Professional Social Workers (Incorporation) Act 2014	24 November	
47/2014	173	Appropriation (Amendment) Act 2014	25 November	

==== 2015 ====
No.	#	Act	Certified	Text
1/2015	174	Appropriation (Amendment) Act 2015	7 February	
2/2015	175	Fisheries and Aquatic Resources (Amendment) Act 2015	2 March	
3/2015	176	National Authority on Tobacco and Alcohol (Amendment) Act 2015	3 March	
4/2015	177	Assistance to and Protection of Victims of Crime and Witnesses Act 2015	7 March	
5/2015	178	National Medicines Regulatory Authority Act 2015	19 March	
6/2015	179	Madahapola Sri Ratnapalaramaya Religious and Buddhist Educational Development Foundation (Incorporation) Act 2015	6 April	
00/2015	180	19th Amendment to the Constitution	15 May	
7/2015	181	Immigrants & Emigrants (Amendment) Act 2015	3 June	
8/2015	182	National Authority on Teacher Education (Repeal) Act 2015	3 June	

=== 15th Parliament ===
==== 2015 ====
Act No.	#	Act	Certified	Text
9/2015	1	Inland Revenue (Amendment) Act 2015	30 October	
10/2015	2	Finance Act 2015	30 October	
11/2015	3	Value Added Tax (Amendment) Act 2015	30 October	
12/2015	4	Nation Building Tax (Amendment) Act 2015	30 October	
13/2015	5	Economic Service Charge (Amendment) Act 2015	30 October	
14/2015	6	Betting & Gaming Levy (Amendment) Act 2015	30 October	

==== 2016 ====
Act No.	#	Act	Certified	Text
1/2016	7	Local Authorities Elections (Amendment) Act 2016	17 February	
2/2016	8	Fisheries and Aquatic Resources (Amendment) Act 2016	17 February	
3/2016	9	National Minimum Wage of Workers Act 2016	23 March	
4/2016	10	Budgetary Relief Allowance of Workers Act 2016	23 March	
5/2016	11	Prescription (Special Provisions) Act 2016	26 April	
6/2016	12	Microfinance Act 2016	20 May	
7/2016	13	Asian Infrastructure Investment Bank Agreement (Ratification) Act 2016	30 May	
8/2016	14	Registration of Persons (Amendment) Act 2016	7 July	
9/2016	15	Mediation Board (Amendment) Act 2016	21 July	
10/2016	16	Homoeopathy Act 2016	27 July	
11/2016	17	National Research Council Act 2016	27 July	
12/2016	18	Right to Information Act 2016	4 August	
13/2016	19	Fiscal Management (Responsibility) (Amendment) Act 2016	23 August	
14/2016	20	Office on Missing Persons (Establishment, Administration & Discharge of Functions) Act 2016	23 August	
15/2016	21	Animal Feed (Amendment) Act 2016	7 September	
16/2016	22	Registration of Deaths (Temporary Provisions) (Amendment) Act 2016	7 September	
17/2016	23	Universities (Amendment) Act 2016	5 October	
18/2016	24	Code of Criminal Procedure (Amendment) Act 2016	17 October	
19/2016	25	Law Commission (Amendment) Act 2016	17 October	
20/2016	26	Value Added Tax (Amendment) Act 2016	1 November	
21/2016	27	Ports & Airports Development Levy (Amendment) Act 2016	7 November	
22/2016	28	Nation Building Tax (Amendment) Act 2016	7 November	
23/2016	29	Appropriation (Amendment) Act 2016	7 November	
24/2016	30	Appropriation Act 2016	10 December	

==== 2017 ====
Act No.	#	Act	Certified	Text
1/2017	31	Medical (Amendment) Act 2017	21 February	
2/2017	32	Divineguama (Amendment) Act 2017	21 February	
3/2017	33	Land (Restrictions on Alienation) (Amendment) Act 2017	22 February	
4/2017	34	Engineering Council, Sri Lanka Act 2017	9 March	
5/2017	35	Revocation of irrevocable Deeds of Gift on the ground of Gross Ingratitude Act 2017	4 April	
6/2017	36	National Transport Commission (Amendment) Act 2017	7 April	
7/2017	37	Economic Service Charge (Amendment) Act 2017	17 May	
8/2017	38	Civil Procedure Code (Amendment) Act 2017	7 June	
9/2017	39	Office on Missing Persons (Establishment, Administration and Discharge of Functions) (Amendment) Act 2017	3 July	
10/2017	40	Registration of Electors Act 2017	21 July	
11/2017	41	Fisheries and Aquatic Resources (Amendment) Act 2017	25 July	
12/2017	42	Foreign Exchange Act 2017	28 July	
13/2017	43	Nation Building Tax (Amendment) Act 2017	9 August	
14/2017	44	Sugathadasa National Sports Complex Authority (Amendment) Act 2017	17 August	
15/2017	45	Ceylon German Technical Training Institute Act 2017	24 August	
16/2017	46	Local Authorities Elections (Amendment) Act 2017	31 August	
17/2017	47	Provincial Councils Elections (Amendment) Act 2017	22 September	
18/2017	48	Motor Traffic (Amendment) Act 2017	3 October	
19/2017	49	Sri Lanka Sustainable Development Act 2017	3 October	
20/2017	50	Municipal Councils (Amendment) Act 2017	12 October	
21/2017	51	Urban Councils (Amendment) Act 2017	12 October	
22/2017	52	Pradeshiya Sabhas (Amendment) Act 2017	12 October	
23/2017	53	Regulation of Insurance Industry (Amendment) Act 2017	19 October	
24/2017	54	Inland Revenue Act 2017	24 October	
25/2017	55	Electronic Transactions Act (Amendment) Act 2017	2 November	
26/2017	56	Judicature (Amendment) Act 2017	17 November	
27/2017	57	Assistance to and Protection of Victims of Crime and Witnesses (Amendment) Act 2017	17 November	
28/2017	58	Local Authorities (Special Provisions) Act 2017	17 November	
29/2017	59	Prevention of Crimes (Amendment) Act 2017	18 November	
30/2017	60	Appropriation Act 2017	9 December	
31/2017	61	Local Authorities Elections (Amendment) Act 2017	14 December	
32/2017	62	Appropriation (Amendment) Act 2017	14 December	
