= Digital Security Act, 2018 =

Repealed legislation in Bangladesh

Digital Security Act, 2018 Cyber Security Act

Jatiya Sangsad
- Long title: Whereas it is expedient and necessary to make provisions for ensuring digital security and identification, prevention, suppression and trial of offences committed through digital device and for matters ancillary thereto
- Citation: Act No. 46 of 2018
- Territorial extent: Bangladesh
- Enacted by: Jatiya Sangsad
- Enacted: 8 October 2018
- Assented to: 8 October 2018
- Commenced: 8 October 2018

Repealed by
- Cyber Security Act, 2023
- Status: Repealed

The Digital Security Act, 2018, was a digital security law in Bangladesh. The Act was passed with the objective of preventing the spread of racism, sectarianism, extremism, terrorist propaganda, and incitement of hatred against religious or ethnic minorities through social, print, or electronic media. Any content over the Internet or any other media that was deemed pornographic or otherwise inappropriate by the government could be punished by fines or prison terms of various lengths.

The Diplomat expressed feared that the law could be used to suppress dissenters against the government, due to some of its provisions that are vague and ambiguous, open to interpretation or prone to abuse. This law has been used to sue and arrest journalists and activists. It has been described as a "Draconian" law.

The Digital Security Act was repealed in 2023 with the Cyber Security Act, 2023.

== History ==
Digital Security Act was adopted in October 2018. The Act was passed by the Parliament of Bangladesh in September 2018. The act allows police officers to detain people without a warrant. The act was opposed by members of the media, the opposition Jatiya Party, and human rights organizations. The act emulated Section 57 of Information and Communication Technology Act, which was passed in 2006, as the model. The act was protested by the Editors' Council. The Daily Star has been critical of the application of the act, describing it as a gag on the free press.

== Cases ==
The Bangladesh police headquarters has reported that in the first five months of 2020, 403 cases were filed and 353 arrests were made under the Act.

=== Prominent cases ===
- On 14 April 2020, Journalist Golam Sarwar Pintu, of Dainik Bangladesher Alo, was arrested under Digital Security Act.
- On 17 April 2020, Toufique Imrose Khalidi, editor of Bdnews24.com, and Mohiuddin Sarker, editor of Jagonews24.com, for publishing a report on the looting of relief materials in Thakurgaon District. The case was filled by Swechasebak League, the volunteer wing of Bangladesh Awami League, leader Mominul Islam Bhasani.
- On 29 April 2020, three journalists were sued in Narsingdi District under the act after publishing news report on an auto rickshaw driver who died after a confrontation with members of Bangladesh Police. The journalists worked for the local newspapers, Dainik Grameen Darpan and Narsingdi Pratidin. The case was filled by officer-in-charge of Ghorashal Police Station, Johirul Alam.
- On 6 May 2020, 11 people were sued by the government of Bangladesh by Assistant Director, Abu Bakar Siddique, of unit 3 of Rapid Action Battalion. Among them one cartoonist Ahmed Kabir Kishore, and one writer, the older brother of Xulhaz Mannan, Minhaj Mannan Emon, Asif Mohiuddin, Tasneem Khalil and Zulkarnain Saer Khan. Mushtaq Ahmed, one of the 11 accused, died in prison on 25 February 2021. He had been in detention since his arrest in May 2020.
- On 6 May 2020, Sub-inspector Motaleb of Rupganj police station in Narayanganj District filed a case against Momen Prodhan for sharing a picture mocking Soto Monir, Member of Parliament of Tangail-2 for harvesting unripe rice plants.
- On 8 May 2020, Journalist Shafiqul Islam Kajol, who had disappeared, was "found" and charged under this act by Bangladesh Police.

== Reception ==
According to Article 19, the act violates human rights and threatens freedom of speech in Bangladesh. According to Amnesty International the act places "dangerous restrictions on freedom of expression". It believed the act will be used against dissidents, similar to the way Information and Communication Technology Act was used to detain hundreds of people. The act has been criticized by the United States as something that could be used to suppress free speech. Bangladesh Nationalist Party has called for the act to be repealed.

22nd Chief Justice of Bangladesh, Syed Mahmud Hossain is a strong supporter of the act. In a verdict made on 6 March 2021, Hossain cautioned an accused of violating the act that there would be no consideration of bail for people who would tarnish the image of Bangladesh in any manner.

== See also ==
- Freedom of the press in Bangladesh
- Torture and Custodial Death (Prevention) Act
