= List of ordinances issued in Bangladesh =

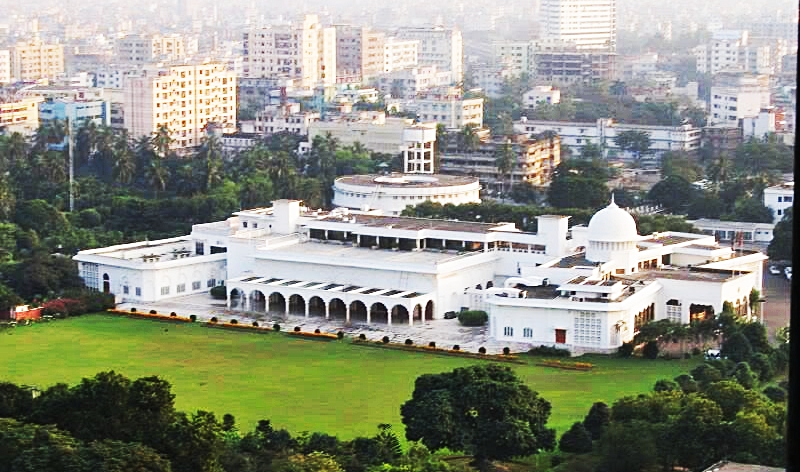
Bangabhaban, the official residence of the President of Bangladesh

This is a list of the ordinances issued by President of Bangladesh.

== 1971 ==
- The Bangladesh (Collection of Taxes) Order, 1971 (Acting President's Order)
- The Bangladesh (Administration of Banks) Order, 1971 (Acting President's Order)

== 1972 ==
- The Bangladesh (Taking Over of Control and Management of Industrial and Commercial Concerns) Order, 1972 (Acting President's Order)
- The Bangladesh (Administration of Financial Institutions) Order, 1972 (A.P.O.)
- The Bangladesh Law Officers Order, 1972 (President's Order) Bangladesh Collaborators (Special Tribunals) Order, 1972
- The Bangladesh Shipping Corporation Order, 1972 (President's Order) [Repealed]
- The Bangladesh (Legal Proceedings) Order, 1972 (President's Order)
- The Bangladesh Abandoned Property (Control, Management and Disposal) Order, 1972 (President's Order)
- The Bangladesh (Adaptation of Insurance Act) Order, 1972 (President's Order)
- The Bangladesh Bank (Demonetisation of Currency Notes) Order, 1972 (President's Order)
- The Bangladesh Constituent Assembly Members (Cessation of Membership) Order, 1972 (P.O.)
- The Bangladesh Banks (Nationalisation) Order, 1972 (President's Order)
- The Bangladesh Industrial Enterprises (Nationalisation) Order, 1972 (President's Order) [Repealed]
- The Bangladesh Inland Water Transport Corporation Order, 1972 (President's Order)
- The Bangladesh (Vesting of Property and Assets) Order, 1972 (President's Order)
- The Bangladesh Insurance (Emergency Provisions) Order, 1972 (President's Order)
- The Bangladesh (Resumption of Easement Lands) Order, 1972 (President's Order)
- The Bangladesh (Adaptation of East Pakistan Intermediate and Secondary Education Ordinance) Order, 1972 (President's Order)
- The Bangladesh Industrial Development Corporation Order, 1972 (President's Order)
- The East Pakistan Madrasah Education Ordinance (Repeal) Order, 1972 (President's Order)
- The Bangladesh Names and Emblems (Prevention of Unauthorised Use) Order, 1972 (President's Order)
- The Bangladesh Legal Practitioner's and Bar Council Order, 1972 (President's Order)
- The Bangladesh (Adaptation of Existing Laws) Order, 1972 (President's Order)
- The Bangladesh Special (Remuneration and Privileges) Order, 1972 (President's Order)
- The Finance (1971-1972) Order, 1972 (President's Order)
- The Bangladesh Nationalised Enterprises and Statutory Corporation (Prohibition of Strikes and Unfair Labour Practices) Order, 1972 (President's Order)
- The Bangladesh Power Development Boards Order, 1972 (President's Order)
- The Bangladesh (Demonetisation of Bank Notes) Order, 1972 (President's Order)
- The Bangladesh Taxation Laws (Adaptation) Order, 1972 (President's Order)
- The Bangladesh College of Physicians and Surgeons Order, 1972 (President's Order) [Repealed]
- The Bangladesh (Whips) Order, 1972 (President's Order)
- The Trading Corporation of Bangladesh Order, 1972 (President's Order)
- The Bangladesh (Legal Proceedings) (Second) Order, 1972 (President's Order)
- The Census Order, 1972 (President's Order)
- The Government Educational and Training Institutions (Adaptation) Order, 1972 (President's Order)
- The Bangladesh (Budgetary Provisions) Order, 1972 (President's Order)
- The National Board of Revenue Order, 1972 (President's Order)
- The Finance Order, 1972 (President's Order)
- The Printing Corporation (Vesting) Order, 1972 (President's Order)
- The Bangladesh Coinage Order, 1972 (President's Order)
- The Bangladesh Currency Order, 1972 (President's Order)
- The International Financial Organisations Order, 1972 (President's Order)
- The Bangladesh (Legal Proceedings) (Third) Order, 1972 (President's Order)
- The Bangladesh (Freedom Fighters) Welfare Trust Order, 1972 (President's Order) [Repealed]
- The Bangladesh Insurance (Nationalisation) Order, 1972 (President's Order)
- The Bangladesh Land Holding (Limitation) Order, 1972 (President's Order)
- The Bangladesh Scouts Order, 1972 (President's Order)
- The Pakistan Television Corporation (Taking Over) Order, 1972 (President's Order)
- The Bangladesh Committee of Management (Temporary Arrangement) Order, 1972 (P.O.)
- The Bangladesh Bank Order, 1972 (President's Order)
- The Bangladesh Shilpa Rin Sangstha Order, 1972 (President's Order)
- The Bangladesh Shilpa Bank Order, 1972 (President's Order)
- The Bangladesh National Anthem, Flag and Emblem Order, 1972 (President's Order)
- The Bangladesh Industrial Development Corporation (Dissolution) Order, 1972 (President's Order)
- The Bangladesh Transfer of Immovable Property (Temporary Provisions) Order, 1972 (President's Order)
- The Bangladesh Parjatan Corporation Order, 1972 (President's Order)
- The Bangladesh Rifles Order, 1972 (President's Order) [Repealed]
- The Bangladesh Citizenship (Temporary Provisions) Order, 1972 (President's Order)
- The Representation of the People Order, 1972 (President's Order)
- The Bangladesh Insurance Corporation (Dissolution) Order, 1972 (President's Order)
- The Bangladesh (Adaptation of University Laws) Ordinance, 1972

== 1973 ==
- The Bangladesh Chartered Accountants Order, 1973 (President's Order)
- The Asian Development Bank Order, 1973 (President's Order)
- The Bangladesh House Building Finance Corporation Order, 1973 (President's Order)
- The Bangladesh Passport Order, 1973 (President's Order)
- The University Grants Commission of Bangladesh Order, 1973 (President's Order)
- The Dhaka University Order, 1973 (President's Order)
- The Bangladesh Laws (Repealing and Amending) Order, 1973 (President's Order)
- The Bangladesh Atomic Energy Commission Order, 1973 (President's Order)
- The Bangladesh National Liberation Struggle (Indemnity) Order, 1973 (President's Order)
- The Trade Marks (Invalidation and Summary Registration) Order, 1973 (President's Order)
- The Bangladesh Wild Life (Preservation) Order, 1973 (President's Order) [Repealed]
- The Bangladesh Red Crescent Society Order, 1973 (President's Order)
- The Bangladesh Krishi Bank Order, 1973 (President's Order)
- The Members of Parliament (Remuneration and Allowances) Order, 1973 (President's Order)

== 1975 ==
- The Jute Companies (Acquisition of Shares) Ordinance, 1975
- The Government of Bangladesh (Services) (Repeal) Ordinance, 1975
- The District Administration (Repeal) Ordinance, 1975
- The Government Servants (Review of Penalties) Ordinance, 1975
- The Gandhi Ashram (Board of Trustees) Ordinance, 1975 [Repealed]
- The Jatiya Rakkhi Bahini (Absorption in the Army) Ordinance, 1975
- The Bidi Manufacture (Prohibition) Ordinance, 1975
- The Bangladesh Government Hats and Bazars (Management) (Repeal) Ordinance, 1975
- The Registration (Extension of Limitation) Ordinance, 1975
- The Universities Laws Amendment Ordinance, 1975
- The Bangladesh Collaborators (Special Tribunals) (Repeal) Ordinance, 1975
- Indemnity Ordinance, 1975

== 1976 ==
- The International Finance Corporation Ordinance, 1976 [Repealed]
- The Pharmacy Ordinance, 1976
- The Delimitation of Constituencies Ordinance, 1976 [Repealed]
- The Statutory Corporations (Delegation of Powers) (Repeal) Ordinance, 1976
- The Alienation of Land (Distressed Circumstances) (Restoration) Ordinance, 1976
- The Supreme Court Judges (Travelling Allowances) Ordinance, 1976 [Repealed]
- The Investment Corporation of Bangladesh Ordinance, 1976 [Repealed]
- The Land Development Tax Ordinance, 1976
- The Appropriation Ordinance, 1976
- The Appropriation (Railways) Ordinance, 1976
- The Finance Ordinance, 1976
- The Appropriation (Supplementary) Ordinance, 1976
- The Railway Nirapatta Bahini Ordinance, 1976 [Repealed]
- The Bangladesh Jute Corporation (Repeal) Ordinance, 1976
- The Newspapers (Annulment of Declaration) (Repeal) Ordinance, 1976
- The Dhaka Metropolitan Police Ordinance, 1976
- The Chittagong Port Authority Ordinance, 1976
- The Mongla Port Authority Ordinance, 1976
- The Public Servants (Marriage with Foreign Nationals) Ordinance, 1976 [Repealed]
- The Bangladesh Agricultural Research Institute Ordinance, 1976 [Repealed]
- The Inland Shipping Ordinance, 1976
- The Bangladesh Shishu Academy Ordinance, 1976 [Repealed]
- The Chittagong Hill Tracts Development Board Ordinance, 1976 [Repealed]
- The Rajshahi Town Development Authority Ordinance, 1976 [Repealed]
- The Police Officers (Special Provisions) Ordinance, 1976
- The Bangladesh Rifles (Special Provisions) Ordinance, 1976 [Repealed]
- The Bangabandhu National Agriculture Award Fund Ordinance, 1976
- The Bangladesh Petroleum Corporation Ordinance, 1976 [Repealed]
- The Chittagong Division Development Board Ordinance, 1976
- The Vested and Non-Resident Property (Administration) (Repeal) Ordinance, 1976

== 1977 ==
- The Bangladesh Malaria Eradication Board (Repeal) Ordinance, 1977 [Repealed]
- The Government of Bangladesh (Services Screening) (Repeal) Ordinance, 1977
- The Bangladesh Biman Corporation Ordinance, 1977
- The Appropriation Ordinance, 1977 The Appropriation (Supplementary) Ordinance, 1977
- The Finance Ordinance, 1977
- The Appropriation (Railways) Ordinance, 1977
- The Appropriation (Railways Supplementary) Ordinance, 1977
- The Paurashava Ordinance, 1977 (Ordinance) [Repealed]
- The Minimum Wages (Fixation) (Repeal) Ordinance, 1977
- The Seeds Ordinance, 1977 [Repealed]
- The Tea Ordinance, 1977 [Repealed]
- The Regulation of Salary of Employees Laws Repeal Ordinance, 1977
- The Export Promotion Bureau Ordinance, 1977 [Repealed]
- The Bangladesh Travel Agencies (Registration and Control) Ordinance, 1977 [Repealed]
- The Housing and Building Research Institute Ordinance, 1977
- The Rural Electrification Board Ordinance, 1977 [Repealed]
- The Cost and Management Accountants Ordinance, 1977 [Repealed]
- The Bangladesh Public Service Commission Ordinance, 1977
- The Financial Institutions Laws Amendment Ordinance, 1977
- The Bangladesh Sericulture Board Ordinance, 1977 [Repealed]
- The Bangladesh Handloom Board Ordinance, 1977 [Repealed]

== 1978 ==
- The Government Servants (Review of Penalties) (Dissolution of Review Board) Ordinance, 1978
- The Prevention of Malaria (Special Provisions) Ordinance, 1978 [Repealed]
- The Bangladesh Council of Scientific and Industrial Research Ordinance, 1978 [Repealed]
- The Madrasah Education Ordinance, 1978 [Repealed]
- The Supreme Court Judges (Remuneration and Privileges) Ordinance, 1978 [Repealed]
- The Defence Services Laws Amendment Ordinance, 1978 [Repealed]
- The Bangla Academy Ordinance, 1978 [Repealed]
- The Finance Ordinance, 1978
- The Appropriation (Railways Supplementary) Ordinance, 1978
- The Appropriation (Railways) Ordinance, 1978
- The Appropriation (Supplementary) Ordinance, 1978
- The Appropriation Ordinance, 1978
- The Asian Reinsurance Corporation Ordinance, 1978 [Repealed]
- The Political Parties Ordinance, 1978
- The Foreign Donations (Voluntary Activities) Regulation Ordinance, 1978 [Repealed]
- The Chittagong Metropolitan Police Ordinance, 1978
- The Law Reforms Ordinance, 1978
- The International Centre for Diarrhoeal Disease Research, Bangladesh, Ordinance, 1978

== 1979 ==
- The Government Servants (Special Provisions) Ordinance, 1979 [Repealed]
- The Bangladesh Telegraph and Telephone Board Ordinance, 1979
- The Railway Property (Unlawful Possession) Ordinance, 1979 [Repealed]
- The President's Pension Ordinance, 1979 [Repealed]
- The Bangladesh Sangbad Sangstha Ordinance, 1979 [Repealed]
- The Leader and Deputy Leader of the Opposition (Remuneration and Privileges) Ordinance, 1979 [Repealed]
- The Defence Services (Supreme Command) Ordinance, 1979 [Repealed]
- The Armed Police Battalions Ordinance, 1979

== 1982 ==
- The Acquisition and Requisition of Immovable Property Ordinance, 1982 [Repealed]
- The Medical Practice and Private Clinics and Laboratories (Regulation) Ordinance, 1982
- The Bangladesh Abandoned Children (Special Provisions) (Repeal) Ordinacne, 1982
- The Zakat Fund Ordinance, 1982
- The Drugs (Control) Ordinance, 1982
- The Standards of Weights and Measures Ordinance, 1982 [Repealed]
- The Bangladesh Flag Vessels (Protection) Ordinance, 1982 [Repealed]
- The Finance Ordinance, 1982
- The Supreme Court Judges (Leave, Pension and Privileges) Ordinance, 1982
- The Emigration Ordinance, 1982 [Repealed]
- The Bangladesh Veterinary Practitioners Ordinance, 1982 [Repealed]
- The Foreign Contributions (Regulation) Ordinance, 1982 [Repealed]
- The Attia Forest (Protection) Ordinance, 1982
- The Public Employees Discipline (Punctual Attendance) Ordinance, 1982 [Repealed]
- The Chittagong City Corporation Ordinance, 1982 [Repealed]
- The Haor Development Board (Dissolution) Ordinance, 1982
- The Off-shore Islands Development Board (Dissolution) Ordinance, 1982
- The Institute of Islamic Education and Research (Repeal) Ordinance, 1982
- The Bangladesh Hotels and Restaurants Ordinance, 1982 [Repealed]
- The Bangladesh Rural Development Board Ordinance, 1982 [Repealed]
- The Electoral Rolls Ordinance, 1982 [Repealed]

== 1983 ==
- The Fish and Fish Products (Inspection and Quality Control) Ordinance, 1983 [Repealed]
- The Bangladesh Railway Board (Repeal) Ordinance, 1983
- The Bangladesh Merchant Shipping Ordinance, 1983
- The Finance Ordinance, 1983
- The Bangladesh Irrigation Water Rate Ordinance, 1983
- The Bangladesh Unani and Ayurvedic Practitioners Ordinance, 1983
- The Marine Fisheries Ordinance, 1983 [Repealed]
- The National Archives Ordinance, 1983 [Repealed]
- The Dhaka City Corporation Ordinance, 1983 [Repealed]
- The Bangladesh Homoeopathic Practitioners Ordinance, 1983
- The Primary Education (Repeal) Ordinance, 1983
- The Grameen Bank Ordinance, 1983 [Repealed]
- The Local Government (Union Parishads) Ordinance, 1983 [Repealed]
- The Bangladesh Jatiya Jadughar Ordinance, 1983
- The Motor Vehicles Ordinance, 1983 [Repealed]
- The Chief Election Commissioner and Election Commissioners (Remuneration and Privileges) Ordinance, 1983
- The National Curriculum and Text-Book Board Ordinance, 1983 [Repealed]
- The Bangladesh Krira Shikkha Protishtan Ordinance, 1983 [Repealed]
- The Bangladesh Nursing Council Ordinance, 1983
- The Santosh Islamic University (Board of Trustees) Ordinance, 1983
- The Hindu Religious Welfare Trust Ordinance, 1983 [Repealed]
- The Buddhist Religious Welfare Trust Ordinance, 1983 [Repealed]
- The Christian Religious Welfare Trust Ordin ince, 1983 [Repealed]
- The Foreign Voluntary Organisations (Acquisition of Immovable Property) Regulation Ordinance, 1983

== 1984 ==
- The Bangladesh Institute of Nuclear Agriculture Ordinance, 1984 (Ordinance) [Repealed]
- The Land Reforms Ordinance, 1984
- The Agricultural Labour (Minimum Wages) Ordinance, 1984
- The Bangladesh Public Administration Training Centre Ordinance, 1984 [Repealed]
- The Bangladesh Institute of International and Strategic Studies Ordinance, 1984 [Repealed]
- The Livestock Research Institute Ordinance, 1984 [Repealed]
- The Industrial Relations (Regulation) (Repeal) Ordinance, 1984
- The Breast-Milk Substitutes (Regulation of Marketing) Ordinance, 1984 [Repealed]
- The Income-tax Ordinance, 1984
- The Bangladesh Women's Rehabilitation and Welfare Foundation (Repeal) Ordinance, 1984
- The Nazrul Institute Ordinance, 1984 [Repealed]
- The Finance Ordinance, 1984
- The Fisheries Research Institute Ordinance, 1984 [Repealed]
- The Districts (Extension to the Chittagong Hill-tracts) Ordinance, 1984
- The Khulna City Corporation Ordinance, 1984 [Repealed]

== 1985 ==
- The Public Servants (Dismissal on Conviction) Ordinance, 1985 [Repealed]
- The Ghousul Azam Abdul Qader Jillani Mosque Trust (Repeal) Ordinance, 1985
- The Family Courts Ordinance, 1985
- The Bangladesh Oil, Gas and Mineral Corporation Ordinance, 1985
- The Surplus Public Servants Absorption Ordinance, 1985 [Repealed]
- The Government Primary School Teachers Welfare Trust Ordinance, 1985
- The Ground Water Management Ordinance, 1985 [Repealed]
- The Finance Ordinance, 1985
- Bangladesh Bridge Authority Ordinance, 1985 [Repealed]
- The Bangladesh Standards and Testing Institution Ordinance, 1985 [Repealed]
- The Civil Aviation Authority Ordinance, 1985 [Repealed]
- The Youth Welfare Fund Ordinance, 1985 [Repealed] The Khulna Metropolitan Police Ordinance, 1985
- The Abandoned Buildings (Supplementary Provisions) Ordinance, 1985

== 1986 ==
- The Chittagong Shahi Jame Masjid Ordinance, 1986
- The Official Vehicles (Regulation of Use) Ordinance, 1986 [Repealed]
- The Drugs (Supplementary Provisions) Ordinance, 1986
- The Police (Non-Gazetted Employees) Welfare Fund Ordinance, 1986
- The Special Security Force Ordinance, 1986 [Repealed]
- The Finance Ordinance, 1986
- The Development Board Laws (Repeal) Ordinance, 1986
- The Public Corporations (Management Co-ordination) Ordinance, 1986
- The Rajshahi Krishi Unnayan Bank Ordinance, 1986 [Repealed]
- The Bangladesh Cha Sramik Kallyan Fund Ordinance, 1986 [Repealed]
- The Bangladesh Academy for Rural Development Ordinance, 1986 [Repealed]

== 2020 ==
- Suppression of Violence against Women and Children (Amendment) Ordinance, 2000

== 2023 ==
- Bangladesh Energy Regulatory Commission (Amendment) Ordinance, 2022

== 2024 & 2025 ==
133 ordinances issued during the tenure of the interim administration.

== See also ==
- List of acts of the Jatiya Sangsad
