= Muhammad Redwanul Islam =

- Military career
- Allegiance: Bangladesh
- Branch: Bangladesh Army; Border Guard Bangladesh
- Service years: 2000–2024
- Rank: Lieutenant colonel
- Unit: Bangladesh Infantry Regiment
- Commands: CO of 26th Border Guard Battalion; CO of 20th Bangladesh Infantry Regiment; Deputy Director and Company Commander, RAB-3
- Conflicts: Operation Thunderbolt
- Awards: Sena Gourab Padak; Sena Utkorsho Padak; President Border Guard Medal

Muhammad Redwanul Islam is a former lieutenant colonel of the Bangladesh Army and former commanding officer of 26th Border Guard Bangladesh battalion. He is accused of crimes against humanity and shooting at protestors during the July Uprising.

== Career ==
Major Islam was the deputy director and company commander of Rapid Action Battalion-3, based in Khilgaon. He received training under the Counter Terrorism Capacity Building project.

As commander of the 26th Battalion Border Guard Bangladesh, Islam oversaw an operation to secure the capital, Dhaka, before the 7 January 2024 election.

During protests against the then Prime Minister Sheikh Hasina in July 2024, video footage of Islam went viral showing him firing at protestors at Rampura, where 28 people were killed in firing by police and Border Guard Bangladesh.

In October 2025, Islam was charged with crimes against humanity at the International Crimes Tribunal-1, with the correlation of the timing of his shootings, and the death of the protestors during protests, as the basis of evidence. He was one of 25 officers charged with crimes against humanity at the court. The Bangladesh Army took him into custody on 12 October.
