= Torture and Custodial Death (Prevention) Act, 2013 =

Legislation in Bangladesh

Jatiya Sangsad
- Citation: Act No. 50 of 2013
- Territorial extent: Bangladesh
- Enacted by: Jatiya Sangsad
- Enacted: 27 October 2013
- Assented to: 27 October 2013
- Commenced: 27 October 2013
- Status: In force

The Torture and Custodial Death (Prevention) Act, 2013 (Bengali: নির্যাতন এবং হেফাজতে মৃত্যু (নিবারণ) আইন, ২০১৩) is an Act passed by the Jatiya Sangsad in 2013 to prohibit custodial torture in Bangladesh.

The Act stipulates that the Police, Rapid Action Battalion (RAB), Border Guard Bangladesh (BGB), Customs, Immigration Department, Criminal Investigation Department (CID), intelligence agencies, Ansar & VDP, Coast Guard, and other public officials are prohibited from extracting confessional statements through torture. The law states any custodian torturing a detainee would be liable of committing offences under the law. It states any person attempting to commit, aiding and abetting to commit, or conspiring to commit an offence must be considered an offender. The law stipulates for any death in custody, the custodian would be awarded with rigorous life imprisonment or a fine of ৳100,000. They must also compensate family members of the affected with ৳200,000.

== History ==
The Torture and Custodial Death (Prevention) Act, 2013 was passed by the Awami League-led Government of Prime Minister Sheikh Hasina as part of its commitment to the United Nations' Committee Against Torture. Bangladesh ratified the United Nations Convention against Torture in 1998.

In 2017, Bangladesh Police demanded that the government of Bangladesh repeal the Torture and Custodial Death (Prevention) Act. Bangladesh Police also requested Prime Minister Sheikh Hasina to amend the law to allow bail for law enforcement officers charged under the act.

The Daily Star reported in 2020 that the people were too scared to file cases under the act as they feared reprisals from law enforcement. On 9 September 2020, the first verdict was delivered under the Torture and Custodial Death (Prevention) Act. On 8 February 2014, Ishtiaque Hossain Jonny and his brother, Imtiaz Hossain Rocky, got in an argument with two police informants who were drunk and harassing women at a wedding. The brothers were detained by officers from Pallabi police station. In custody Jonny was tortured to death. KM Emrul Kayesh of the High Court Division sentenced three police officers from Pallabi police station to life imprisonment over the death of Jonny under the Torture and Custodial Death (Prevention) Act. The court also sentenced two informants to seven years imprisonment.

On 2 April 2020, former Inspector of Amtali Police Station, Manoranjan Mistry, was charged under this act for the death of Shanu Hawlader, a 55 year old farmer, in police custody.
