= Information and Communication Technology Act, 2006 =

The Information and Communication Technology Act, 2006 is an act passed by the Parliament of Bangladesh in 2006 to promote and regulate ICT services in the country. Cybercrimes in Bangladesh are adjudicated by cyber tribunals established under this Act. The act was further revised through an amendment in 2013. However, the law became controversial due to certain provisions that were seen as threats to freedom of speech. Section 57, in particular, drew significant criticism and was eventually replaced by the controversial Digital Security Act.

== History ==
The Information and Communication Technology Act was passed in 2006 by the Bangladesh Nationalist Party-Bangladesh Jamaat-e-Islami led government. On 20 August 2013, the Information and Communication Technology Act, 2006 was amended through an ordinance which was passed by the parliament of Bangladesh on 9 October. The amendment allowed the police to detain suspects under the act without warrants and increased the jail time. The amendment also removed the requirement for law enforcement to seek prior approval from the government before filing cases under the act. The amendment was criticized for potential for violation of human rights. Iftekharuzzaman, director of Transparency International Bangladesh, criticized the act while Shahdeen Malik said the amendment would drag Bangladesh back to the "mediaeval age".

=== Prominent cases ===
- Mahmudur Rahman, editor of the daily Amar Desh, was sued under the Information and Communication Technology Act on 13 December 2012 on sedition charges for writing on the 2012 ICT Skype controversy.
- Shahidul Alam, a notable photographer, was charged under Section 57 of the Information and Communication Technology Act, 2006 by the Detective Branch during the 2018 Bangladesh road-safety protests. Shahidul Alam has challenged the legality of the Section 57 of the ICT act with the Bangladesh Supreme Court after his challenge was rejected by Bangladesh High Court.

== Criticism ==
The law was criticized for not defining liabilities of domain holders.

=== Section 57 ===
Section 57 of the Information and Communication Technology Act, 2006 drew criticism from writers and journalists for its potential impact on freedom of speech in Bangladesh. This was the most used section of the act by the Bangladesh Police to file cases. The act made it illegal to post material online that is provocative, defamatory, or "hurt religious sentimentality". Jyotirmoy Barua criticized the act, saying it was used by the Bangladesh Police and the Awami League to silence dissent. In four months of 2017, 21 journalists were sued under the act. From 2013 to 2017, a minimum of 700 cases were filed under the act with the Cyber Tribunal.

The section was replaced by the Digital Security Act, 2018. The act has been criticized for curbing free speech in Bangladesh. The Digital Security Act has been criticized by the Office of the United Nations High Commissioner for Human Rights.
