= Mozammel Haque Babu =

Bangladeshi journalist

Mozammel Haque Babu is a Bangladeshi journalist and former CEO and chief editor of Ekattor TV. He was the president of Editors Guild. He was also the vice-president of Association of Television Channel Owners. Babu is currently in jail on charges of abetting genocide, crimes against humanity, and murder during the student protests. Mozammel Babu was detained by local authorities while allegedly attempting to cross the Dhobaura border area in Mymensingh district into India. The Bangladesh Journalists in International Media (BJIM) and the Committee to Protect Journalists (CPJ) have expressed serious concerns over his detention.

== Career ==
Babu founded weekly Deshbandhu in 1987, where Anisul Hoque worked. He later founded Purbabhas, another weekly. Babu was one of the founders of Editors Guild to protect freedom of the press. Babu moderated a session of Dhaka Global Dialogue, 2019.

Babu was selected president of the Editors Guild, an association of news editors, on 17 March 2020 after Syed Ishtiaque Reza proposed his name. He succeeded Toufique Imrose Khalidi, the editor of Bdnews24.com, who had become president in 2019. He was critical of All the Prime Minister's Men, a report by Al Jazeera. He expressed concern of at the suggestion of the Ambassador of the United States to Bangladesh, Peter D. Haas, suggesting possible visa restrictions on media workers. He was a director of Fareast Islami Life Insurance Company Limited.

== Controversies ==
Gazi MH Tamim filed a case of genocide at the International Crimes Tribunal against Babu, former prime minister Sheikh Hasina, former prosecutor of the International Crimes Tribunal Tureen Afroz, journalist Shahriar Kabir, professor of the University of Dhaka Muntasir Mamun and 15 others over the police raid on 2013 Shapla Square protests of Hefazat-e-Islam Bangladesh. Other accused were journalist Subhash Singha Roy, convener of Gonojagoron Moncho Imran H. Sarker, journalist Ahmed Jobaer, journalist Nayeemul Islam Khan, former director general of National Security Intelligence M. Manzur Ahmed, and Aziz Ahmed, chief of Bangladesh Army.

The Bangladesh Financial Intelligence Unit (BFIU) also instructed banks to freeze Babu's accounts.

== Personal life ==
Babu is married to Aparajita Haque, a former member of parliament. His father in law, Khandaker Asaduzzaman, was an advisor to Sheikh Hasina and his brother in law, Khandaker Mashiuzzaman Romel, was the president of Dhaka Club.

Babu is a member of the board of governors of Dhaka Ahsania Mission for Ahshania Mission Cancer and General Hospital, Uttara.

== See also ==
- Persecution of journalists in Bangladesh under Muhammad Yunus
