= Gazi MH Tamim =

Bangladeshi lawyer

Gazi MH Tamim is a Bangladeshi lawyer on the Supreme Court of Bangladesh. He was a defense lawyer at the International Crimes Tribunal. He has filed genocide charges against members of the former Awami League government and media personnel at the International Crimes Tribunal after the resignation of Prime Minister Sheikh Hasina. Now he is a prosecutor of International Crimes Tribunal.

== Early life ==
Tamim did his bachelor of law from 2004 to 2008 at Eastern University. He did his masters of law at Bangladesh Islami University. He did a post graduate diploma in genocide studies at the University of Dhaka.

== Career ==
In January 2011, Tamim became a defense lawyer at the International Crimes Tribunal.

Tamim became a lawyer of the Supreme Court of Bangladesh in August 2013. He was a defense lawyer of AKM Yusuf at the International Crimes Tribunal. Yusuf was a leader of Bangladesh Jamaat-e-Islami and had accused of committing war crimes during the Bangladesh Liberation War. In 2016, he defended eight members of Al-Badr, two in custody and six absconding, who were sentenced to life imprisonment on 18 July 2016. He vowed to appeal their sentences after the verdict.

On 14 August 2024, Tamim filed a genocide charge against former prime minister Sheikh Hasina over death of protestors in the 2024 Bangladesh quota reform movement from 15 July to 5 August and nine others. He filed the case on behalf of Bulbul Kabir, a father of grade nine student Arif Ahmed Siyam. Other accused include Ministers, former police officers, and Awami League activists.

Tamim filed a case of genocide at the International Crimes Tribunal against former prime minister Sheikh Hasina, former prosecutor of the International Crimes Tribunal Tureen Afroz, journalist Shahriar Kabir, professor of the University of Dhaka Muntasir Mamun and 15 others over the police raid on 2013 Shapla Square protests of Hefazat-e-Islam Bangladesh. Tamim filed the complaint on behalf of the joint secretary general of Hefazat-e-Islam Bangladesh, Harun Ijahar Chowdhury. The other accused in the case include Obaidul Quader, general secretary of the Awami League, Rashed Khan Menon, former Minister of Civil Aviation and Tourism, Sheikh Fazle Noor Taposh, Mayor of Dhaka South, Salman F. Rahman, former advisor of Prime Minister Sheikh Hasina, Tarique Ahmed Siddique, former advisor to Prime Minister of Sheikh Hasina, A. K. M. Shahidul Haque, inspector general of Bangladesh Police, journalist Subhash Singha Roy, convener of Gonojagoron Moncho Imran H. Sarker, journalist Mozammel Haque Babu, journalist Ahmed Zobayer, journalist Nayeemul Islam Khan, former director general of National Security Intelligence M Manzur Ahmed, and Aziz Ahmed, chief of Bangladesh Army.

On 7 September 2024, Tamim, Md Mizanul Islam, Mohammad Tajul Islam, and BM Sultan Mahmud were appointed prosecutors of the International Crimes Tribunal. Md Mizanul Islam and Mohammad Tajul Islam were defense lawyers of Bangladesh Jamaat-e-Islami leaders.
