= Subhash Singha Roy =

Bangladeshi journalist

Subhash Singha Roy is a Bangladeshi journalist and politician. He is a recipient of the Bangla Academy Literary Award. He is the editor of the news website ABnews24.com. Following the fall of the Sheikh Hasina-led Awami League government, he was sued on charges of genocide. Reporters Without Borders called the charges against Roy and 24 other journalists "outrageous".

== Career ==
Roy was a member of the Bangladesh Chhatra League.

He was a director of Sonali Bank. In September 2012, Roy and fellow bank director Jannat Ara Henry denied having any links with the Hallmark-Sonali Bank Loan Scam. They were questioned by the Anti-Corruption Commission. The commission did not indict them when it pressed charges over the scam. He was reappointed director of the bank in 2012 along with Chairman Quazi Baharul Islam, and directors Shahidulla Mia and Kashem Humayun.

Roy is a member of the Bangladesh Progressive Columnist Forum.

In January 2023, Roy was awarded the Bangla Academy Literary Award by Prime Minister Sheikh Hasina for his research on Bangabandhu Sheikh Mujibur Rahman. He was critical of the Bangladesh Nationalist Party threatening journalists for allegedly supporting the Awami League government.

The Anti-Discrimination Students' Movement demanded Roy be expelled from the Jatiya Press Club on 10 August 2024 following the fall of the Sheikh Hasina-led Awami League government. This was criticized as an attack on the freedom of the press. Roy was sued along with 25 journalists at the International Crimes Tribunal for crimes against humanity. The case was filed by Gazi MH Tamim representing Harun Ijahar Chowdhury of Hefazat-e-Islam Bangladesh over the deaths in police action against the 2013 Shapla Square protests. Others accused included Shahriar Kabir and Muntassir Mamoon. Reporters Without Borders demanded withdrawal of the case against journalists. The Bangladesh Financial Intelligence Unit sought information on his bank accounts and those of 28 journalists.

== Bibliography ==
- "Bangabandhur Ditiyo Biplob o Baksal" (Bangabandhu's second revolution and BAKSAL
- Padma Setur Satkahon (Details of Padma Bridge) co-written with Abdul Mannan.
