= Mohammad Gholam Rabbani =

Bangladeshi judge

- মোহাম্মদ গোলাম রাব্বানী

Justice of the Appellate Division of Bangladesh
- In office 11 January 2001 – 10 January 2002

Justice of the High Court Division of Bangladesh
- In office 18 February 1992 – 11 January 2001

Personal details
- Born: 10 January 1937 Rajshahi, Bengal Province, British India
- Died: 14 November 2022 (aged 85) Dhaka, Bangladesh
- Profession: Judge

Mohammad Gholam Rabbani (10 January 1937 – 14 November 2022) was a judge of the Appellate Division of Bangladesh Supreme Court.

== Background ==
Mohammad Gholam Rabbani was born on 10 January 1937 in his maternal grandfather's house in Rajshahi in the then Bengal Province, British India.

== Career ==
Rabbani became a lawyer in 1960.

Rabbani was appointed a judge of the High Court Division on 18 February 1992.

On 11 January 2001, Rabbani was elevated to the Appellate Division of the Bangladesh Supreme Court. In the Hefzur Rahman Vs Shamsun Nahar case, he mandated that men provide for their divorced wife till they remarry. He and Justice Nazmun Ara Sultana said in their verdict only the court could decide on matters concerning Muslim family law. The verdict led to violent protests in which seven people were killed following which the verdict was stayed by the Supreme Court.

He along with all the other judges of the Appellate Division refused to hear an appeal against a High Court verdict that found two accused in the Assassination of Sheikh Mujibur Rahman case innocent. The appeal was filed by five convicts in the case who were not acquitted.

He retired on 10 January 2002. Following the 2005 Jhalakathi bombing targeting Judges, Rabbai said that the terrorist where targeting the judiciary as they could not change it graduate and would have to change it instantly. He said, "It's not that the judges, who have been targeted, attempted to interpret Islamic rules; in fact, they are not empowered to do that. So it's clear that the perpetrators with fascist mentality are out to unleash a reign of terror. Their intention is to render the judicial system ineffective so that the people will seek arbitration before the persons who want to implement Shariah law instead of going to court".

Rabbani called for the restoration of the 1972 constitution of Bangladesh for the trial of those accused of war crimes during the Bangladesh Liberation War at an event organized by the Forum for Secular Bangladesh in 2008. He was the judge of a symbolic peoples tribunal at the Jatiya Press Club that heard charges against Asian Development Bank, International Monetary Fund, and the World Bank.

Rabbani was a member of the Asiatic Society of Bangladesh and the Bangla Academy. He wrote the foreword of the book Deprivation of Hindu Minority in Bangladesh Living with Vested Property. He called for the return of vested properties to their original owners. In 2009, he was a joint convenor of the National Committee to Protect and Develop Railway and Waterways. He commented that it was education that could make men "rational, courageous, benevolent and selfless" not religion at a discussion titled Education and Education Policy. In 2010, he was the president of the Ekatturer Ghatak Dalal Nirmul Committee.

In 2015, leaders of the Ekattorer Ghatak Dalal Nirmul Committee, Justice Rabbani, Shahriar Kabir, and Muntasir Mamun criticised Bangladesh Nationalist Party chairperson Khaleda Zia for questioning the number of dead in the Bangladesh Liberation War. He received criticism for endorsing anti-Islamic activities referenced in Shah Ahmad Shafi's open letter named An Open Letter from Shah Ahmad Shafi to the Government and the Public related to the Shahbag protests in 2013.

== Bibliography ==
- Bangladesher Sangbidhaner Bikash
- Boishishtho o Bichyuti
- Bangladesher Dukkher Bichar
- Journey Within Islam
- Munajat Manjusha
- Okalati O Jajiati Jiboner Jolorekha

== Personal life and death ==
Rabbani had a son, Ziaul Hasan Ruposh, a United States resident barrister.

Rabbani died on 14 November 2022 in his own residence in Gulshan, Dhaka.
