= National Intelligence Coordination Committee =

National Intelligence Coordination Committee may refer to:

- National Committee for Intelligence Coordination of Bangladesh
- National Intelligence Coordination Committee (Australia)
- National Intelligence Coordination Committee (Pakistan)

== See also ==
- Intelligence Committee (disambiguation)
