= T. M. Jobaer =

Bangladeshi army general

Tariq Mohammed Jobaer
- তারিক মোহাম্মদ জোবায়ের
- Military career
- Allegiance: Bangladesh
- Branch: Bangladesh Army
- Service years: 1987–2024
- Rank: Major General
- Unit: Regiment of Artillery
- Commands: Director General of National Security Intelligence; Director of CTIB; Director General of National Telecommunication Monitoring Centre; Commander of 6th Independent Air Defence Artillery Brigade; Commandant of School of Military Intelligence

Tariq Mohammed Jobaer (Bengali: তারিক মোহাম্মদ জোবায়ের) is a retired major general who was director general of National Security Intelligence, the main civil intelligence agency in Bangladesh, from July 2018 to March 2024.

== Career ==
In 2011, Jobaer served as the director of National Security Intelligence. While serving as a director, he focused on the War on Terror. He identified Hizb ut-Tahrir as the biggest threat among terror organizations in South Asia in an interview with The Outlook. Before taking over the charge of director general, National Security Intelligence, he was the minister (counsellor) of the Bangladesh High Commission to the United Kingdom.

On 31 July 2018, Major General Jobaer was appointed director general of National Security Intelligence, replacing Major General Md Shamsul Haque. The Ministry of Public Administration transferred him from the Bangladesh Army to the National Security Intelligence under the Prime Minister's Office. He made the welcome speech at the inauguration of the new headquarters of the National Security Intelligence in April 2021, which Prime Minister Sheikh Hasina inaugurated. He is the director general of National Security Intelligence as of November 2023.

== Corruption Allegations and Investigation ==
Following the downfall of the Sheikh Hasina led government in August 2024, the Anti-Corruption Commission (ACC) initiated an inquiry into T.M. Jobaer following a complaint detailing extensive illicit wealth accumulation and money laundering. The allegations included abusing his official authority from 2018 to April 2024 to acquire domestic assets—including real estate in Gulshan, Uttara, Gazipur, Savar, and Segunbagicha—as well as purchasing an overseas property in London valued at over £2.9 million.

On 6 October 2024, a Dhaka court granted a petition by the Dudok to impose a travel ban on T.M. Jobaer and his wife, Fahamina Masud, to prevent them from fleeing the country amid the ongoing financial investigation.
