= Prime Minister of Bangladesh =

Head of government of Bangladesh

Prime Minister of the People's Republic of Bangladesh
- গণপ্রজাতন্ত্রী বাংলাদেশের প্রধানমন্ত্রী
- Seal of the prime minister of Bangladesh

- Standard of the prime minister of Bangladesh

- Incumbent; Tarique Rahman since 17 February 2026
- Government of Bangladesh; Prime Minister's Office; Cabinet Division
- Style: Mr. Prime Minister (informal); The Honorable (formal); His Excellency (diplomatic)
- Type: Head of government
- Abbreviation: PM
- Member of: Cabinet; Parliament; Armed Forces Division; Planning Commission; Intelligence Community; National Committee for Intelligence Coordination; National Committee on Security Affairs; National Cyber Security Council
- Reports to: President of Bangladesh; Parliament of Bangladesh
- Residence: 196, Gulshan Avenue, Dhaka
- Seat: Primary: Prime Minister's Office, Old Sangsad Bhaban, Tejgaon, Dhaka; Secondary: Bangladesh Secretariat, Segunbagicha, Dhaka
- Appointer: President of Bangladesh by convention, based on appointee's ability to command the confidence of the Jatiya Sangsad
- Term length: At the pleasure of the president; Jatiya Sangsad term is 5 years unless dissolved sooner No term limits
- Constituting instrument: Constitution of Bangladesh
- Inaugural holder: Tajuddin Ahmed
- Formation: 17 April 1971; 55 years ago
- Salary: ৳305000 (US$2,500) per month (incl. allowances)
- Website: pmo.gov.bd

The Prime Minister of Bangladesh (Note: Bengali: বাংলাদেশের প্রধানমন্ত্রী, romanized: Baṅladeśer Prôdhanmôntri, pronounced [ˈbaŋlaˌdeʃeɾ ˈpɾɔdʱanˌmɔntɾiˑ]), officially the Prime Minister of the People’s Republic of Bangladesh (Note: Bengali: গণপ্রজাতন্ত্রী বাংলাদেশের প্রধানমন্ত্রী, romanized: Gôṇôprôjatôntri Baṅladeśer Prôdhanmôntri,pronounced [ˈɡɔnoˌpɾodʒaˌtɔntɾiˑ ˈbaŋlaˌdeʃeɾ ˈpɾɔdʱanˌmɔntɾiˑ]), is the head of government of Bangladesh. The Prime Minister leads the cabinet and, together with the cabinet, is collectively responsible for their policies and decisions to the parliament, to their political party, and ultimately to the electorate. While the Prime Minister is the chief executive of the government, they are ceremonially appointed by the President of Bangladesh and exercise powers in accordance with the constitution and parliamentary conventions.

Prime Minister's crest.

The position was taken over by the Bangladesh Armed Forces during the years of 1975–78, 1982–86 and 1990–91 due to imposed martial law. In each of these periods, the national government leadership was controlled by the Armed Forces with the executive authority of the President and the Prime Minister. During the period between 1996 and 2008, the Chief Adviser of the caretaker government exercised authority as per the Constitution as chief executive for 90 days during the transition from one elected government to another. The Chief Adviser heads an Advisory Committee consisting of ten advisers. With powers roughly equivalent to an elected Prime Minister, it's executive power was constrained by certain constitutional limitations. The system was scrapped in 2011 by the 15th Amendment of the Constitution to allow any political government to conduct a general election in the future. However, on 17 December 2024, the 15th Amendment was declared illegal by the Supreme Court of Bangladesh.

Sheikh Hasina was the longest-serving Prime Minister in the country's history until her resignation on 5 August 2024, which left the position vacant. Tarique Rahman assumed office on 17 February 2026, after his Bangladesh Nationalist Party won the 2026 general election.

== Appointment ==
According to the Constitution, the Prime Minister is appointed by the President based upon the result of the electorate's choice in a parliamentary general election held by the Election Commission. The Prime Minister is the leader of the majority party (or coalition) in the Jatiya Sangsad and must have the confidence of the Jatiya Sangsad to govern. The Cabinet is composed of Ministers selected by the Prime Minister and appointed by the President. At least 90% of the Ministers must be MPs. The other 10% may be non-MP experts or "technocrats" who are not otherwise disqualified from being elected MPs. According to the Constitution, the President can dissolve Parliament upon the written request of the Prime Minister. The appointments of the Prime Minister and other Ministers and Ministers of State shall be made by the President: At least nine-tenths of their number shall be appointed from among Members of Parliament, and not more than one-tenth of their number may be chosen from persons qualified for election as Members of Parliament.

The Prime Minister is appointed and sworn in by the President through the oath below:

Bangla

আমি, (নাম), সশ্রদ্ধচিত্তে শপথ (বা দৃঢ়ভাবে ঘোষণা) করিতেছি যে, আমি আইন-অনুযায়ী সরকারের প্রধানমন্ত্রী (কিংবা ক্ষেত্রমত মন্ত্রী, প্রতি-মন্ত্রী, বা উপমন্ত্রী)-পদের কর্তব্য বিশ্বস্ততার সহিত পালন করিব: আমি বাংলাদেশের প্রতি অকৃত্রিম বিশ্বাস ও আনুগত্য পোষণ করিব; আমি সংবিধানের রক্ষণ, সমর্থন ও নিরাপত্তাবিধান করিব; এবং আমি ভীতি বা অনুগ্রহ, অনুরাগ বা বিরাগের বশবর্তী না হইয়া সকলের প্রতি আইন-অনুযায়ী যথাবিহীত আচরণ করিব।

English

I, (name) do swear with honor (or solemnly affirm) that I, according to the laws, shall faithfully discharge the functions of the office of the Prime Minister (or Minister or State Minister or Sub-minister, as the circumstances allow). I shall possess pure faith and obedience to Bangladesh. I shall preserve, support, and secure the constitution and deal with all with equity as suggested by laws, without being affected by fear or mercy, love or hatred.

== Duties of the Office ==
The office of the Prime Minister is located at Tejgaon in Dhaka. It is considered a government ministry and, among other duties, provides clerical, security, and other support to the Prime Minister, governs intelligence affairs and NGOs, and arranges protocol and ceremonies.

Some specific ministries/departments are not allocated to anyone in the cabinet but the Prime Minister. The Prime Minister is usually always in charge/head of:

- Leader of the House (responsible for managing and scheduling government business in the Jatiya Sangsad)
- Cabinet Division
- Head of the Armed Forces Division
- Minister of Defense
- Minister of Power, Energy and Mineral Resources
- Chairperson of the Planning Commission
- Bangladeshi intelligence community

== History and timeline ==
Bangladesh's origins lie in Bengal, a province of British India that included present-day West Bengal. Between 1937 and 1947, it was intermittently governed by a popularly elected ministry, whose head was often designated the Premier of Bengal. In 1947, the Province of Bengal was partitioned into the Indian state of West Bengal and East Pakistan. All three erstwhile Bengal premiers—A. K. Fazlul Huq, Khawaja Nazimuddin and H. S. Suhrawardy—became Pakistani citizens; the latter two went on to become Prime Ministers of Pakistan in the 1950s.

East Pakistan's history from 1947 to 1971 was marked by political instability and economic difficulties. The nascent democratic institutions foundered in the face of military intervention in 1958, and the government imposed martial law between 1958 and 1962 and again between 1969 and 1971. Between 1947 and 1971, it was intermittently governed by Governors and the Chief Ministers of East Pakistan.

=== Independence and first parliamentary era (1971–1975) ===
The modern office of the prime minister was established following the declaration of independence of East Pakistan by the Provisional Government of Bangladesh on 17 April 1971, of which Tajuddin Ahmad became the first Prime Minister of Bangladesh. Since the adoption of the current Constitution of Bangladesh in 1972, the formal title of the office is the Prime Minister of the People's Republic of Bangladesh.

=== Military coups and presidential regimes (1975–1991) ===
From 1975 to 1991, the Prime Minister was appointed by the President while the President had executive power. However, S. A. Bari was Prime Minister during this time.

=== Return of parliamentary government (1991–present) ===
In September 1991, the Electorate approved changes to the Constitution, formally creating a parliamentary system and returning governing power to the office of the Prime Minister, as in Bangladesh's original Constitution. In October 1991, Members of Parliament elected a new head of state, President Abdur Rahman Biswas.

==== Premiership of Khaleda Zia (1991–1996, 2001–2006) ====
Khaleda Zia served as Prime Minister of Bangladesh twice from 1991 to 1996 and from 2001 to 2006. Once in power, Khaleda Zia's government made substantial changes in education policy, introducing free education for girls up to the 10th grade, a stipend for female students, and food for education programme funds. It also made the highest budgetary allocation in the education sector since her administration.

She became Prime Minister for the second consecutive term after the BNP had a landslide victory on 15 February 1996 general election to the sixth Jatiya Sangsad which was widely believed to be rigged, after allegations or the BNP bribing the then Election Commissioner arose. The election was, however, boycotted by all other major parties who were demanding that the elections be held under a neutral caretaker government, following allegations of rigging in a by-election held in 1994. Turnout was estimated at around 5%, though the government at the time claimed it to be much higher. On 12 June 1996 polls, BNP lost to Sheikh Hasina's Awami League but emerged as the largest opposition party in the country's parliamentary history with 116 seats.

Aiming to return to power, the BNP formed a four-party alliance on 6 January 1999 with its former political opponent, the Jatiya Party, and the Islamic party of Jamaat-e-Islami Bangladesh and the Islami Oikya Jot whom launched several agitation programmes against the ruling Awami League. In the 2001 general elections BNP won the election with a two-thirds majority of seats in the Jatiya Sangsad and 46% of the total vote (compared to the principal opposition party's 40%) and Khaleda Zia was once again sworn in as the Prime Minister of Bangladesh.

In the 2008 elections, they faced a landslide defeat. The Khaleda-led Four-Party alliance won only 32 seats and emerged as the smallest opposition party in the country's parliamentary history. They won only 32% of the total vote whereas their main rival, the Awami League won more than 50% of the total vote.

In the Tenth Jatiya Sangsad election of 2014, the BNP, along with its 18 party alliance boycotted and violently protested the election to no avail.

==== 2007 political crisis and caretaker government ====
The scheduled 22 January 2007 elections were marred by controversy. The Awami League and its allies protested, saying that the elections would not be fair because of alleged bias by the caretaker government in favour of Khaleda Zia and the BNP. Hasina demanded that the head of the caretaker government, President Iajuddin Ahmed, step down from that position, and on 3 January 2007, she announced that the Awami League and its allies would boycott the elections. Later in the month, the military led by Army Chief General Moinuddin Ahmed intervened and President Iajuddin Ahmed was asked to resign as the Chief Adviser. He was also made to declare a state of emergency. A new military-controlled caretaker government was formed with Fakhruddin Ahmed as the chief adviser. The scheduled parliamentary election was postponed.

On 12 January 2007, President Iajuddin Ahmed swore in Fakhruddin Ahmed as the Chief Adviser to the interim caretaker government. For a country widely perceived as one of the world's most corrupt, the most dramatic aspect of Fakhruddin Ahmed's rule is his antigraft campaign against the establishment. So far, more than 160 senior politicians, top civil servants and security officials had been arrested on suspicion of graft and other economic crimes. The roundup had netted former ministers from the two main political parties, including former prime ministers Khaleda Zia and Sheikh Hasina and former adviser Fazlul Haque.

On 11 May 2017, the office of then Prime Minister Sheikh Hasina announced that the US Secretary of State Hillary Clinton called her office in March 2011 to demand that Muhammad Yunus, a 2006 Nobel Peace Prize winner, be restored to his role as Chairman of the microcredit bank, Grameen Bank. The bank's nonprofit Grameen America, which Yunus chairs, had given between $100,000 and $250,000 to the Clinton Global Initiative. Grameen Research, which is also chaired by Yunus, had donated between $25,000 and $50,000, according to the Clinton Foundation website.

==== Premiership of Sheikh Hasina (1996–2001, 2009–2024) ====
Sheikh Hasina lost to Khaleda Zia in the 1991 parliamentary election after managing to win 88 seats and her party sat in opposition benches. She boycotted the 1996 February 15 elections giving Khaleda Zia a default victory.

The Awami League won 146 seats in the 1996 June 12 parliamentary elections. The support of the Jatiya Party and a few independent candidates were enough for the 150 or more seats needed for the required majority. Hasina took the oath as the prime minister of Bangladesh. She vowed to create a Government of National Unity. Though some smaller parties and a few individuals from BNP did join the government, the distance between the main two political parties as well as their leaders remained as large as ever.

The Awami League was defeated in the 2001 Parliamentary elections. It won only 62 seats in the Parliament, while the Four-Party Alliance led by the Bangladesh Nationalist Party won more than 200 seats, giving them a two-thirds majority in the Parliament. Hasina herself was defeated from a constituency in Rangpur, which happened to contain her husband's hometown, but won from three other seats. Sheikh Hasina and the Awami League rejected the results, claiming that the election was rigged with the help of the President and the caretaker government. However, the international community was largely satisfied with the elections and the Four-Party Alliance went on to form the government.

In the December 2008 election, the Sheikh Hasina-led Awami League achieved a landslide victory, winning 230 seats, which gave them a two-thirds majority in the Parliament. She made an alliance with the Jatiya Party and other leftist parties, named the Grand Alliance which won 252 seats in the Parliament. Sheikh Hasina took oath as Prime Minister on 6 January 2009. She began her third term as Prime Minister of Bangladesh after winning a walkover 5 January 2014 election when Khaleda Zia's BNP boycotted the general election.

Sheikh Hasina secured a fourth term as Prime Minister after winning the 2018 general election. Since then, Hasina became the longest-serving Prime Minister of Bangladesh since the country's independence in 1971.

After nationwide protests against the government, on 5 August 2024, Sheikh Hasina was forced to resign and flee from Bangladesh to India.

==== Premiership of Tarique Rahman (2026–present) ====
Following an 18-month transition under an interim government led by Nobel Laureate Muhammad Yunus, Bangladesh held its 13th general election on 12 February 2026. The Bangladesh Nationalist Party (BNP), led by Chairman Tarique Rahman, secured a landslide victory, winning 209 seats in the Jatiya Sangsad. On 17 February 2026, Tarique Rahman was sworn in as the 11th Prime Minister of Bangladesh by President Mohammed Shahabuddin, marking the end of the interim administration and the country's first elected government since the 2024 uprising.

== Prime Ministerial residence and office ==
The principal official residence of the Prime Minister at State Guest House Jamuna is located in Dhaka. The Prime Minister's Office is situated at Tejgaon in Dhaka, which serves as the principal workplace of the Prime Minister.

Prime ministerial amenities

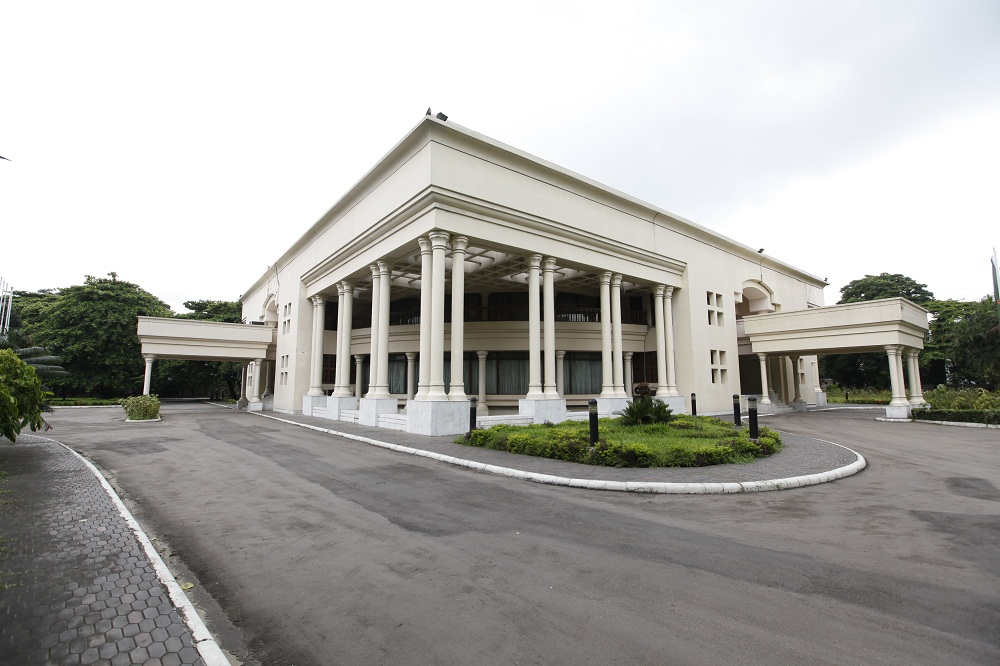
State Guest House Jamuna, official residence of the Prime Minister, located in Dhaka.

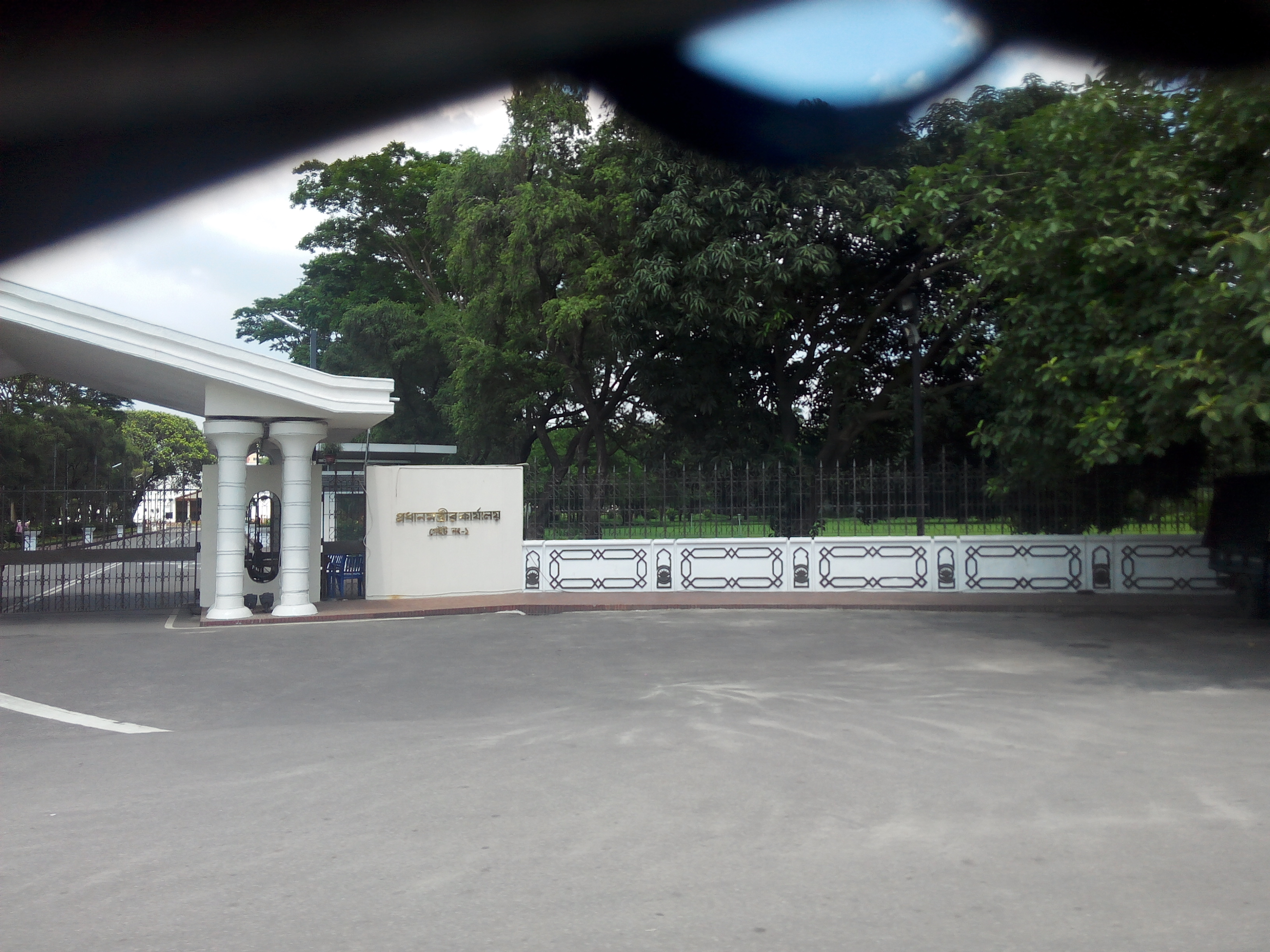
Prime Minister's Office, located at Tejgaon, Dhaka.

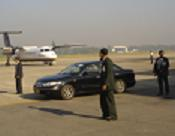
Special Security Force, which provides physical security to the President and Prime Minister.

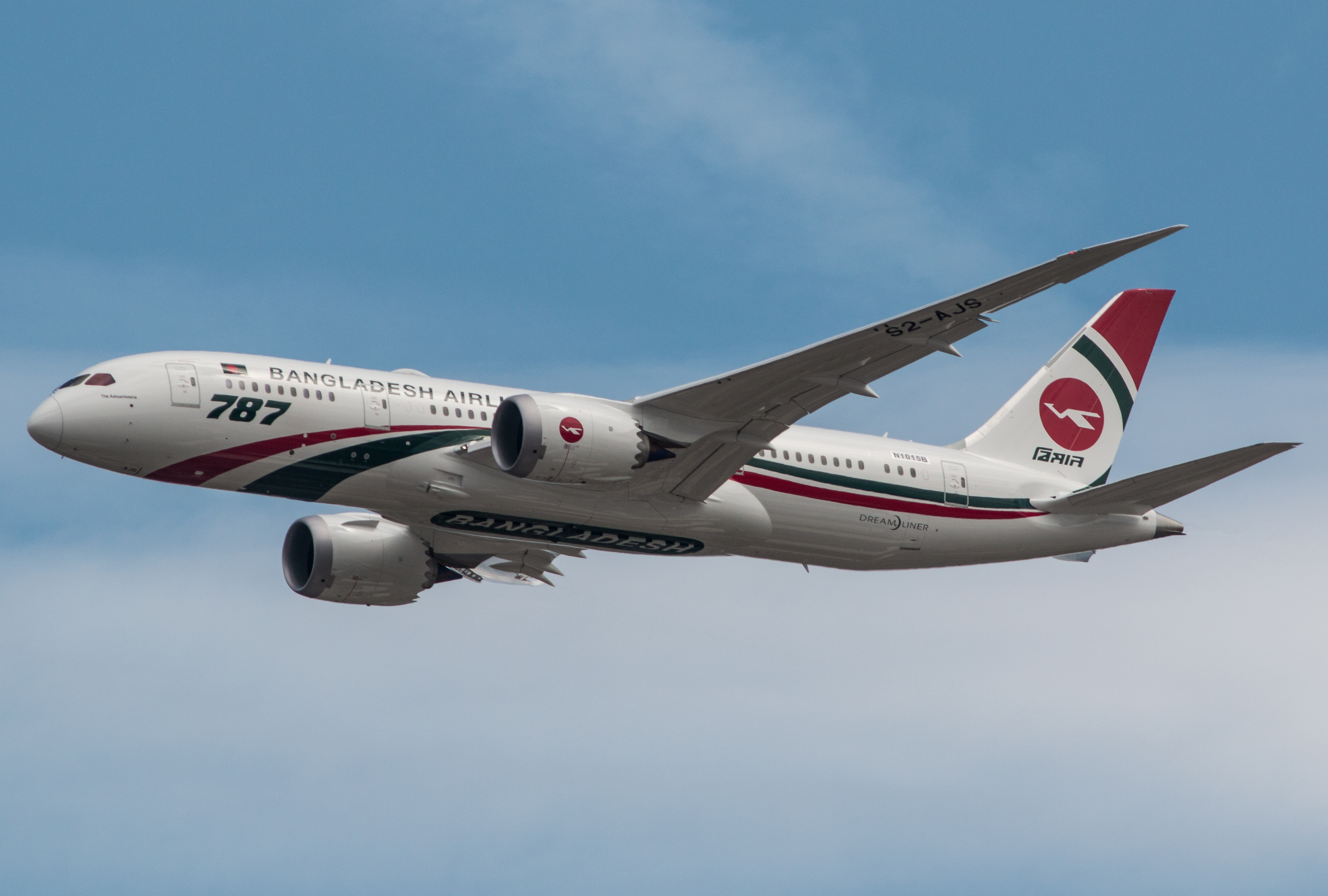
Biman Bangladesh Airlines Boeing 787-9 Dreamliner, used for official overseas visits by the Prime Minister.

== See also ==
- Chief Adviser of Bangladesh
- Constitution of Bangladesh
- Deputy Prime Minister of Bangladesh
- Foreign Minister of Bangladesh
- List of prime ministers of Bangladesh
- Politics of Bangladesh
- President of Bangladesh
- Prime Minister of Bengal
