= Abu Mohammad Sarwar Farid =

Director general of National Intelligence Agency of Bangladesh

- আবু মোহাম্মদ সরোয়ার ফরিদ

Director General of National Security Intelligence
- Incumbent
- Assumed office 13 August 2024
- President: Mohammed Shahabuddin; Hafiz Uddin Ahmad (acting); Mirza Fakhrul Islam Alamgir
- Prime Minister: Tarique Rahman Muhammad Yunus
- Preceded by: Mohammed Hossain Al Morshed

Personal details
- Born: Bangladesh
- Education: Military Training Bangladesh Military Academy
- Awards: Bishishto Seba Padak (BSP)

Military service
- Allegiance: Bangladesh
- Branch/service: Bangladesh Army
- Years of service: 1992–present
- Rank: Major General
- Unit: Armoured Corps
- Commands: Director general of National Security Intelligence; Commandant of Bangladesh Military Academy; Commander of 93rd Armoured Brigade

Abu Mohammad Sarwar Farid ndc, afwc, psc is a major general of the Bangladesh Army currently serving as director general of National Security Intelligence and formerly the commandant of the Bangladesh Military Academy. Before that, he was deputy military secretary (DMS) at Bangladesh Army Headquarters and also served as director of armour in Army Headquarters, Armoured Directorate. He commanded the 93rd Armoured Brigade under the 11th Infantry Division in Bogra. After that, he served as a directing staff in the Armed Forces War Course Wing in the National Defence College, Bangladesh.
