= Select Committee on Intelligence =

Select Committee on Intelligence can refer to:

- The Pike Committee (established 1975, mandate expired 1976, no report)
- The United States Senate Select Committee on Intelligence (permanent, established 1976)
- The United States House Permanent Select Committee on Intelligence (established 1977, replacing Pike Committee)

== See also ==
- Intelligence Committee (disambiguation)
