= Intelligence Committee =

Intelligence Committee may refer to:

- European Coordinating Committee for Artificial Intelligence
- Intelligence Community Coordination Committee (Croatia)
- Intelligence and Security Committee of Parliament (UK)
- Joint Intelligence Committee (India), see National Security Council (India)
- Joint Intelligence Committee (UK)
- National Intelligence Co-ordinating Committee (South Africa)
- Parliamentary Joint Committee on Intelligence and Security (Australia)
- Security Intelligence Review Committee (Canada)
- United States House Permanent Select Committee on Intelligence
- United States Senate Select Committee on Intelligence

== See also ==
- Joint Intelligence Committee (disambiguation)
- National Security Council (disambiguation)
- Select Committee on Intelligence (disambiguation)
- National Intelligence Coordination Committee (disambiguation)
