= Fareast Islami Life Insurance Company Limited =

- Company type: Public Limited
- Industry: Financial services, insurance
- Founded: May 29, 2000; 26 years ago
- Headquarters: Dhaka, Bangladesh
- Key people: Sheikh Kabir Hossain (Chairman); M. A. Khaleq (Founder); Dr. Chowdhury Mohammad Wasiuddin FCA, FCMA (CEO)
- Number of employees: 1,811
- Website: www.fareastislamilife.com

Fareast Islami Life Insurance Limited (Bengali: ফারইস্ট ইসলামী লাইফ ইন্স্যুরেন্স কোম্পানী লিমিটেড), was founded in Bangladesh as a public life insurance company in 2000. Currently the company has 23 Divisional Offices, 103 Service Center Offices, 252 Zonal Offices and 635 Premium collection centers throughout Bangladesh. Sheikh Kabir Hossain is the chairman of the company.

== History ==
Fareast Islami Life Insurance Company Limited was established on 29 May 2000. It then listed with the Dhaka Stock Exchange and Chittagong Stock Exchange.

MA Khaleque, director of Fareast Islami Life Insurance Company Limited, was appointed chairman of Fareast Finance and Investment Limited on 18 September 2007.

Md Nazrul Islam was appointed chairman of the Fareast Islami Life Insurance Company Limited in February 2010. Islam was a founding director of the insurance company and managing director of Surmi Cold Storage Limited.

The Bangladesh Securities and Exchange Commission has removed the board of directors of Fareast Islamic Life Insurance and appointed 10 new independent directors on 1 September 2021 to protect investors, policyholders and the overall capital market. Insurance Development and Regulatory Authority removed the chief executive officer of Fareast Islami Life Insurance Company Limited, Md Hemayet Ullah, after its investigation had found evidence of financial irregularities. It also banned him from joining any insurance company. According to an audit report by A Wahab & Co. Chartered Accountants, commissioned by Bangladesh Securities and Exchange Commission, 21 billion taka was stolen from Fareast Islami Life Insurance Company Limited from 2010 to 2020.

On 22 February 2022, Bangladesh Securities and Exchange Commission reformed the board again and appointed Sheikh Kabir Hossain chairman of the board. Beximco Group had taken control of Fareast Islami Life Insurance Company Limited. The insurance company decided to sell assets to pay insurance claims. It shares declined in the Dhaka Stock Exchange. Sheikh Kabir Hossain claimed the company paid to taxes from 2014 to 2021 to the National Board of Revenue.

== Financial performance ==
As on 31 December 2017 the authorized capital of the company is taka 1000 million and paid up capital is taka 747.42 million.

== Insurance services ==
- Ekok Bima
- Sarbojonon Bima
- Group Bima

== Board of directors ==
Name	Title	Reference
Sheikh Kabir Hossain	Chairman	
Ibraheem Hosein Khan	Director	
Sheikh Mamun Khaled	Director	
Md. Rafiqul Islam	Director	
Lafifa Jamal	Director	
Mozammel Haque Babu	Director	
Mohammad Helal Miah	Director	
Arif Khan	Director	
Mostafa Zamanul Bahar	Director	
Jahurul Islam Chowdhury	Director	
Mohammad Ali Nawaz	Director	
Md. Masum Mia	Director	

== Subsidiaries ==
- Fareast Islami Securities Limited
- Fareast Islami Properties Limited
