= Joint Intelligence Committee =

The Joint Intelligence Committee is a nodal government agency in several countries, responsible for the internal and external security apparatus of the respective nations.

- Joint Intelligence Committee (India)
- Joint Intelligence Committee (United Kingdom)
- National Committee for Intelligence Coordination (Bangladesh)

== See also ==
- Intelligence Committee (disambiguation)
- National Security Council (disambiguation)
- United States Joint Intelligence Community Council, formerly U.S. Joint Intelligence Committee for the Joint Chiefs of Staff
