= A. B. S. Safdar =

Bangladesh police and intelligence officer (born 1925)

- Born: 29 December 1925; Mymensingh, Bengal, British India
- Police career
- Allegiance: Pakistan (before 1971); Bangladesh
- Branch: Directorate General of Intelligence and Investigation; Bangladesh Police
- Service years: 1950 – 1990
- Status: Retired
- Rank: Deputy Inspector General
- Awards: BPM (bar); PPM (bsa)

A. B. S. Safdar (born 29 December 1925) was a Bangladeshi police and intelligence officer. He is a former director general of National Security Intelligence, the main civilian intelligence agency of Bangladesh.

== Early life ==
Safdar was born in 1925 in Mymensingh District, East Bengal, British India.

== Career ==
Safdar joined the intelligence wing of the Pakistan Police in 1950. In 1959, he became the assistant director of the Intelligence Bureau of Pakistan Police. He received a promotion in 1965 to the post of deputy director general of the Intelligence Bureau and was in charge of the bureau in East Pakistan.

During the Bangladesh Liberation War, Safder travelled to the United States under USAID's Office of Public Safety to train at the International Police Academy. Near the end of the war, he and fellow trainee Abdur Rahim returned to East Pakistan and joined the Pakistan security establishment. Safdar did counter insurgency and Rahim was placed in the Razakar unit.

After the assassination of Sheikh Mujibur Rahman, Safder was appointed the director general of National Security Intelligence. He met Mahbub Alam Chashi and Taheruddin Thakur before the coup and found prominent roles in the new administration.
