= Ekattorer Ghatak Dalal Nirmul Committee =

Bangladeshi activist organisation

The Ekattorer Ghatak Dalal Nirmul Committee (Bengali: একাত্তরের ঘাতক দালাল নির্মূল কমিটি, lit. 'Committee for Eradicating the Killers and Collaborators of '71') is a pressure group founded to demand the trial of war criminals from the Bangladesh War of Independence. It advocates for secularism in Bangladesh.

== History ==
The Ekattorer Ghatak Dalal Nirmul Committee was founded on 19 January 1992 by 101 Bangladeshi activists to seek justice for the genocide carried out by the Pakistan Army and local collaborators during the Bangladesh War of Independence. Operating in Bangladesh and Britain, they claim the policies of the Jamaat-e-Islami are similar to those of the British National Party. The London branch protested against the arrival of Delwar Hossain Sayeedi at a Mosque in East London and demanded his British visa be revoked.

In 2000, the committee's leaders established the secular heritage group Swadhinata Trust to raise youth awareness of, and pride in, Bengali history and culture.

In 2015, leaders of the committee, Justice Mohammad Gholam Rabbani, Shahriar Kabir, and Muntasir Mamun criticised Bangladesh Nationalist Party chairperson Khaleda Zia for questioning the number of dead in the Bangladesh War of Independence. Ekattorer Ghatak Dalal Nirmul Committee in 2016 asked the government to make denial of Bangladesh genocide a crime. It established a European chapter with Tarun Kanti Chowdhury as its president.

Shahriar Kabir was elected president and Kazi Mukul was elected general secretary of the committee in 2017. Justice Mohammad Golam Rabbani was elected president of the 31 member advisory board. The general executive board had 61 members.

In 2020, the president of the committee, Shahriar Kabir, asked UN Human Rights Commission to resettle the Rohingya refugees in Bangladesh to a third country. Describing them as victims of genocide it collected the testimonies of 10 thousand Rohingya refugees. It criticized Muslim extremists who dug out the body of a Ahmadiyya baby from a Muslim graveyard in Brahmanbaria District.

In April 2022, the committee called for the release of a Hindu college teacher detained for "insulting" Islam describing the charges as a conspiracy by religious extremists. It called for a judicial committee to investigate the incident. The committee created People's Inquiry Commission on Fundamentalist and Communal Violence (Gono Commission) with the Parliamentary Caucus on Indigenous and Minorities to investigate religious violence and published a white paper which identified 116 Islamic scholars as money launderers and financiers of terrorism. In response, the Islamic Cultural Forum Bangladesh asked the government to investigate the wealth of Ekattorer Ghatak Dalal Nirmul Committee members. The Minister of Home Affairs, Asaduzzaman Khan, initially supported the report but later changed his position. In June, it organized an event criticizing the Digital Security Act and highlighting victims of its use.

== Notable members ==
- Jahanara Imam
- Shahriar Kabir
