= Tureen Afroz =

Bangladeshi lawyer

- তুরিন আফরোজ়
- Occupations: Lawyer, educator
- Known for: Prosecutor at the International Crimes Tribunal of Bangladesh

Tureen Afroz (Bengali: তুরিন আফরোজ়; [t̪urin afɾoz]) is a Bangladeshi lawyer and educator. She has worked a lawyer at the Supreme Court of Bangladesh and taught law at Western Sydney University, Monash University and BRAC University. In 2013, she was appointed by the Hasina government as a senior prosecutor of the International Crimes Tribunal of Bangladesh to try war criminals of the 1971 Bangladesh Liberation War. She prosecuted cases against Ali Ahsan Mohammad Mojaheed, Ghulam Azam, Muhammad Kamaruzzaman, Motiur Rahman Nizami, and Salauddin Quader Chowdhury. She was removed from the tribunal amid controversy over allegedly meeting accused war criminal Mohammad Wahidul Haque. She has denied these allegations.

== Career ==
Afroz became a lawyer of the Supreme Court of Bangladesh in 1998. She started working as a lawyer in Australia in 2001. She taught law at Western Sydney University and Monash University. She joined BRAC University as an associate professor of school of law.

Afroz was appointed prosecutor of the International Crimes Tribunal in February 2013. She prosecuted the case against Ali Ahsan Mohammad Mojaheed and Ghulam Azam, Bangladesh Jamaat-e-Islami politicians.

Afroz's mother Samsunnahar Taslim filed a complaint at Uttara West police station alleging Afroz evicted her and her son, Shahnewaz Ahmed Shishir, from their residence in Uttara on 2 March 2017. She had evicted her family and other tenants of the building and filed a case against her own family in May. Her family asked for Prime Minister Sheikh Hasina to intervene while she questioned the point of asking the prime minister for held regarding a judicial matter.

In November 2015, Afroz received a threatening phone call asking her to withdraw from the International Crimes Tribunal prosecution team in the war crimes case against Syed Mohammad Hossain, alias Hossain Daroga or Razakarer Daroga, of Kishoreganj District. Hossain was a member of Razakar paramilitary unit and his father, Syed Musleh Uddin, was the leader of the Kishoreganj District unit of the East Pakistan Central Peace Committee and vice president of Pakistan Democratic Party in East Pakistan. Hossain left for Malaysia on 21 May 2014 five months before the prosecution began against him. Hossain was sentenced to death in absentia.

Afroz sought the nomination of Awami League in 2018 to contest the upcoming parliamentary elections.

Afroz was removed from all cases of the in May 2018 after some allegation of indiscipline was raised against her. Ekattorer Ghatak Dalal Nirmul Committee also opened their investigation against her on allegations of meeting a war crimes suspect at a restaurant in secret. Anisul Huq, Minister of Law, promised a quick resolution on the complaint against her. On 11 November 2019, the Solicitor Wing of the Law and Justice Division removed Afroz from the prosecution team after the Ministry of Law found evidence of her talking to a war criminal accused and telling the suspect the case against them had "no merit". She denied allegations of meeting Mohammad Wahidul Haque, war crimes suspect, and taking money from him, and said she was not allowed to defend herself. The allegations were raised by senior coordinator of International Crimes Tribunal's investigation agency Md Sanaul Haque. Mohammad Wahidul Haque served in the Pakistan Army's 29th Cavalry Regiment during the Bangladesh Liberation War and had been charged with participating in the killing of hundreds in Rangpur.

Afroz was the member secretary of Gono Commission of Ekattorer Ghatak Dalal Nirmul Committee. She was part of a delegation led by AHM Shamsuddin Chowdhury Manik which submitted a list of 116 Islamic leaders to the Anti-Corruption Commission which was condemned in a statement by Hefazat-e-Islam Bangladesh. On 10 April 2022, She joined a march of Sohel Taj to the Ganabhaban to demand 10 April, the day Mujibnagar government took oath, be declared Republic Day of Bangladesh.

In January 2023, Justices Md. Salim and Md. Riaz Uddin Khan of the High Court Division stopped Afroz's case against her brother and asked her why the case should not be dismissed.

After the resignation of Prime Minister Sheikh Hasina in August 2024, Afroz said that her Uttara residence was attacked by Islamist radicals. She said that she was assaulted with her head being shaved for not wearing a hijab and the attackers stabbing her thighs multiple times with a pencil. Afroz also stated that they pressured her to denounce the International Crimes Tribunal. Her ancestral home and law office in Jaldhaka Upazila of Nilphamari District were also vandalized.

In August 2024, a complaint was filed at the International Crimes Tribunal against her and 18 others, alleging crimes against humanity and genocide, alleging her involvement in police shootings during the 2013 Shapla Square protests. She was arrested in April 2025.

== Bibliography ==
- Trials of 1971 Bangladesh Genocide Through a Legal Lens (2019)
- Justice for 1971 War Rapes Trial and Beyond (2022)
