= M. Manzur Ahmed =

Bangladeshi general

M Manzur Ahmed
- Military career
- Allegiance: Bangladesh
- Branch: Bangladesh Army
- Service years: 1976–2014
- Rank: Brigadier General
- Unit: Army Service Corps
- Commands: Director General of National Security Intelligence; Station Commander, Jessore; Commandant of Army Service Corps Centre and School

M Manzur Ahmed is a retired brigadier general of the Bangladesh Army and former director-general of National Security Intelligence, the main civilian intelligence agency of Bangladesh.

== Career ==
Ahmed joined the Bangladesh Army as part of the 2nd short commission.

Ahmed was sent to forced retirement during the Bangladesh Nationalist Party government term from 2001 to 2006. He was reinstated in the army and promoted after the Awami League came to power in 2009.

Despite being a retired officer, Ahmed was appointed director general of National Security Intelligence on 17 March 2009. He replaced Sheikh Md Monirul Islam, who had been appointed director general of the Bangladesh Institute of International and Strategic Studies. Ahmed was placed in charge of the agency as part of Prime Minister Sheikh Hasina's plan to reorganize the intelligence agencies of Bangladesh.

Ahmed was replaced by Major General Shamsul Haque as director general of National Security Intelligence in March 2014.
