= National Committee for Intelligence Coordination =

Bangladesh government advisory committee

- গোয়েন্দা সমন্বয়ের জন্য জাতীয় কমিটি
- · National Emblem · Government Seal

Committee overview
- Formed: July 2009; 17 years ago
- Jurisdiction: Bangladesh
- Headquarters: Bangladesh Secretariat, Dhaka
- Prime Minister of Bangladesh responsible: Tarique Rahman, Chairman
- Committee executive: AKM Shamsul Islam, Defence Adviser to the Prime Minister of Bangladesh (Coordinator)
- Parent department: Prime Minister’s Office
- Parent Committee: Government of Bangladesh

The National Committee for Intelligence Coordination is the principal forum used by the Prime Minister of Bangladesh for matters of national security and coordination between intelligence agencies. Since its inception under Sheikh Hasina, the function of the council has been to advise and assist the prime minister on national security and foreign policies.

The committee has also served as the prime minister's principal arm for coordination and integration of intelligence on foreign, defence, and internal security matters by bringing together the principal civilian and military intelligence outfits. The council has counterparts in the Joint Intelligence Committee of many other nations.

== History ==
Bangladesh is situated near the infamous Golden Crescent and close to the Golden Triangle, of which are both located in Myanmar. This makes it a transit point for the smuggling of heroin and illegal arms from Myanmar. From Bangladesh, one can easily reach Pakistan and Afghanistan. The close proximity of Bangladesh to Myanmar, Pakistan, Afghanistan and insurgency affected states of India also results in a high probability for Bangladesh to have complex security problems arising from terrorism.

The last nail of the coffin that showed the lack of coordination between intelligence agencies was the disastrous mutiny in the Bangladesh Rifles (BDR) in 2009, in which the country had lost 74 people, including 47 military officers. Reform initiatives taken after the mutiny, which led to the creation of "National Committee for Intelligence Coordination".

== Structure ==
Compared with the American, British, and Indian intelligence coordination structures, the intelligence coordination mechanism in Bangladesh is unique. At least two factors can reveal why the Bangladeshi case is unique and does not resemble the UK, US or Indian model.

First, the Prime Minister's security advisor is the coordinator of the NCIC, unlike the UK and India, where a serving bureaucrat in the cabinet secretariat assumes the role of intelligence coordinator. In the US, the Director of National Intelligence (DNI) is responsible for the coordination of various civilian, military, and signals intelligence agencies. In the United Kingdom and India, the Joint Intelligence Committee (JIC)—located in the cabinet secretariat—is responsible for the coordination of domestic, external, and defence intelligence agencies. Therefore, a cabinet secretary in the British and Indian system of JIC acts as a counterpart of the American DNI.

Second, the co-ordination structure in Bangladesh is also sharply different from the American case, in which the position of Director of National Intelligence is separate from that of the National Security Advisor.

== Membership ==
In July 2009, the government formed an eight-member "National Committee for Intelligence Coordination," with the prime minister as the chairperson, to effectively coordinate the intelligence activities of different agencies.

Her security advisor coordinates this committee. The NCIC comprises the Cabinet Secretary, Principal Secretary to the Prime Minister's Office, the Inspector General of Police and the respective Director Generals of the National Security Intelligence (NSI), the Directorate General of Forces Intelligence (DGFI). The heads of the Special Response Battalion (SRB), the Special Security Force (SSF), the Special Branch (SB), and the Criminal Investigation Department (CID) are required to assist the NCIC in performing its activities.

Structure of the National Committee for Intelligence Coordination
Chairperson	Prime Minister of Bangladesh
Coordinator	Defence Adviser to the Prime Minister of Bangladesh
Members	Cabinet Secretary Principal Secretary to the Prime Minister The Inspector General of Police Director General of National Security Intelligence Director General of the Directorate General of Forces Intelligence
Assisting Members	Director General of Special Response Battalion Director General of Special Security Force Chief of Special Branch Chief of Criminal Investigation Department

== Functions ==
- Provide necessary information to the government before any crisis arises.
- Coordinate and strengthen the activities of the various intelligence agencies functioning within Bangladesh.
- Improving the campaign against extremism through exchanges between law enforcement and intelligence agencies.
