= Bangladeshi intelligence community =

Group of intelligence agencies of Bangladesh

The Bangladesh intelligence community consists of multiple intelligence agencies. They gather and analyze information with the aim of protecting the state from foreign and domestic enemies. The main agencies are the Directorate General of Forces Intelligence (DGFI), the National Security Intelligence (NSI), and the Special Branch (SB). All are under civilian control. The heads of the DGFI and NSI have historically been the closest advisers of the leader of Bangladesh.

== Members ==
During the 1971 Bangladesh Liberation War, the Mukti Bahini were supported by volunteers who collected intelligence.

=== Directorate General of Forces Intelligence ===
The Directorate General of Forces Intelligence (DGFI) is the country's key intelligence agency. It is the top military intelligence outfit. It focuses on national defense and monitors disaffection within the ranks. It also runs counterintelligence operations. The army, navy, and air force each have their own intelligence directorates. They deal with tactical data to support military operations.

=== National Security Intelligence ===
The National Security Intelligence (NSI) is a civilian agency. Even so, it is commonly headed by a senior military officer. It mainly engages in worldwide espionage. It also monitors domestic politics.

=== Special Branch ===
The Special Branch (SB) is the main intelligence unit of the Bangladesh Police. It supplements the intelligence capabilities of the NSI and the DGFI.

=== Criminal Investigation Department ===
The Criminal Investigation Department (CID) is a specialized body of the Bangladesh Police. It gathers intelligence, but the SB is the main intelligence-gathering unit of the police.

== Organizational structure and leadership ==
When Bangladesh was ruled by military strongmen Ziaur Rahman and Hussain Muhammad Ershad, the DGFI and NSI were under military control. Post-1990, the DGFI started to report to the defence minister (a portfolio commonly reserved by the prime minister). Whether under military or civilian control, the heads of the DGFI and NSI have usually been the closest advisers of the leader of Bangladesh.

Human rights organizations have alleged that the DGFI, NSI, and SB have all used informers to surveil Bangladeshis perceived to be critical of the government.
