= Syed Ishtiaque Reza =

Bangladeshi journalist

- সৈয়দ ইশতিয়াক রেজা
- Born: 1965 (age 60–61); Brahmanbaria
- Education: Dhaka University
- Occupations: Journalist; media executive

Syed Ishtiaque Reza (Bengali: সৈয়দ ইশতিয়াক রেজা) is a Bangladeshi journalist, media executive, and editor. He was the chief executive officer and editor-in-chief of Global Television Limited and held the position of editor-in-chief at GTV and the online news portal Sara Bangla. He was also the former chief news editor at Ekattor TV.

On February 20, 2021, he was appointed as information editor in the Information and Research Subcommittee of the Bangladesh Awami League.

== Early life and education ==
Reza completed his bachelor's and master's degrees in Mass Communication and journalism from the University of Dhaka.

== Career ==
Reza started his career as a university correspondent for The Bangladesh Observer and later worked as a senior reporter at The Financial Express and chief reporter at The Morning Sun. In 1999, he joined Ekushey Television as news editor. He worked as the news editor of the ATN Bangla. He was the special correspondent of The Financial Express. He was the chief news editor of television channel RTV. He then was the head of news of Boishakhi TV.

Reza also was the chief executive officer and editor-in-chief of Global Television Limited and was the chief editor of GTV. On April 26, 2022, while CEO of Global Television, he was elected president of the executive committee of the Brahmanbaria Journalist Forum, Dhaka (BJFD).

Reza is the joint editor of Editors Guild Bangladesh, an organization comprising editors from various media outlets. He received the Manansheel Award in the Essay and Research category from the Dhaka Reporters Unity (DRU) for his contributions to literature.

In 2018, Reza was one of the journalist leaders who threatened to seize the Ministry of Home Affairs if the government did not bring to justice those who attacked journalists during the road safety protests. He is a faculty member of the State University of Bangladesh.

After the fall of the Sheikh Hasina led Awami League government in August 2024, Reza was accused in a murder case related to the student quota protests in Jatrabari, Dhaka. A case was filed against him and six other journalists following the death of a student during clashes between protesters and law enforcement. Also accused in the case was former prime minister Sheikh Hasina. In December 2024, the Bangladesh Financial Intelligence Unit (BFIU) requested banking information for Reza and 11 other journalists, along with details of their privately owned companies. The Muhammad Yunus led interim government stripped him and 117 other journalists of their accreditation.
