= National Security Intelligence =

National Intelligence Agency of Bangladesh

- জাতীয় নিরাপত্তা গোয়েন্দা
- Insignia of NSI

Agency overview
- Formed: 29 December 1972; 53 years ago
- Type: Intelligence agency
- Jurisdiction: Government of Bangladesh
- Headquarters: NSI Building, Segunbagicha, Dhaka, Bangladesh; 23.74°N 90.41°E
- Motto: Committed to national security
- Employees: Classified
- Annual budget: Classified
- Agency executive: MG Abu Mohammad Sarwar Farid, Director General
- Parent department: Prime Minister's Office

The National Security Intelligence (Note: Bengali: জাতীয় নিরাপত্তা গোয়েন্দা) commonly known as the NSI, is an intelligence agency of Bangladesh. It serves as the government's lead organization for internal security, counter-intelligence, and foreign intelligence operations. It is part of the Bangladesh Intelligence Community.

== History ==
The National Security Intelligence was established in 1972. It operated under the direct oversight of the Prime Minister's Office and was expected to safeguard the state's stability.

In its early years, NSI operated with a low public profile while developing its internal surveillance capabilities. Personnel were drawn from the civil bureaucracy as well as former Mukti Bahini operatives, and the agency was headquartered in Segunbagicha, Dhaka. On 15 August 1975, when Sheikh Mujibur Rahman and much of his family were assassinated. The incident highlighted intelligence shortcomings and underscored NSI's inability to anticipate the military coup carried out by disaffected army officers, an event widely described as Bangladesh's first major intelligence failure. During the BAKSAL period, NSI increasingly emphasized strengthening state control amid post-independence insurgencies and political fragmentation; however, the coup disrupted coordination across the wider intelligence ecosystem. Under President Ziaur Rahman, NSI continued domestic monitoring, but following the establishment of the Directorate General of Forces Intelligence in 1978, military-led foreign intelligence and counter-insurgency became more prominent.

During the period of military rule under Hussain Muhammad Ershad, intelligence operations became increasingly militarized. The National Security Intelligence was frequently confined to supporting roles in internal surveillance, and the Ershad government used intelligence functions to monitor political opponents. This approach coincided with widespread protests that ultimately led to Ershad's ouster in 1990. After the restoration of parliamentary democracy in 1991 under Prime Minister Khaleda Zia's Bangladesh Nationalist Party government, NSI's mandate was renewed with greater emphasis on its civilian character and on coordination with police intelligence structures, particularly the Special Branch, for counter-terrorism amid rising Islamist militancy and intensifying political violence. During BNP tenures, NSI expanded its monitoring activities, including attention to cross-border threats and internal stability. However, it faced criticism for insufficient responses to major attacks, including the 2004 grenade attacks on Awami League rallies.

Under Sheikh Hasina's Awami League governments, NSI increasingly emphasized centralized surveillance. In 2009, the National Committee for Intelligence Coordination was formed to coordinate multi-agency intelligence activities. NSI has also been criticized for alleged political use, including monitoring opposition figures and participating in digital monitoring initiatives linked, from 2015 onward, to claims of foreign funding and spyware procurement. The U.S. State Department has reported allegations that NSI was involved in politically motivated human rights violations, including arbitrary detentions, indicating a shift from primarily security-focused intelligence toward regime protection.

After Sheikh Hasina resigned in August 2024 amid mass protests, the interim government led by Muhammad Yunus prioritized de-politicizing intelligence functions. It replaced NSI leadership associated with the previous regime and initiated reforms to limit domestic operations, improve oversight, and refocus intelligence work on evidence-based threat assessment rather than partisan goals. These steps were framed as a response to critiques that NSI's evolution has often reflected ruling-party priorities, contributing to persistent gaps, including in counter-terrorism, despite increased resources.

== Structure ==
The National Security Intelligence (NSI) has a hierarchical structure with several senior positions intended to maintain effective operations. At the top of the organization are the Director (Brigadier General/DIGP), Additional Director (Colonel/Addl DIGP), Joint Director, Deputy Director, and Assistant Director, each responsible for key aspects of the agency's functioning. In addition to these leadership roles, the NSI employs specialized personnel, including computer engineers, telephone engineers, and research officers, who provide technical and analytical support for its intelligence activities.

The organization is further divided into directorates focused on particular aspects of national security. These directorates include the Internal, Dhaka Wing, Border, External, Security, Media Wing, Training, Political, Eco-Security, Administration, Research, Counter-Terrorism Cell, and Intelligence directorates. Each directorate has a distinct mandate contributing to the overarching goal of safeguarding national interests.

=== Functions ===
- Information gathering: collecting intelligence regarding foreign governments, organizations, individuals, and politicians, as well as monitoring Bangladeshi government officials, political parties, extremist groups, separatists, religious bodies, unions, popular movements, and non-governmental organizations (NGOs) that may affect national security.
- Information analysis: evaluating collected information alongside intelligence from other Bangladeshi agencies to produce assessments for the Prime Minister and the National Committee for Intelligence Coordination.
- Covert operations: conducting or overseeing covert activities abroad, either through its personnel, military members, or allied forces, based on executive orders.

=== List of directors general ===
- Mohammad Mesbahuddin (1972-August 1975)
- A. B. S. Safdar (August 1975-?)
- S A Hakim (-)
- Brigadier General Ashraf (-)
- Brigadier General A. J. M. Aminul Haque, Bir Uttom (1993 - 1996)
- Major General Golam Kader (1996)
- Major General Mustafizur Rahman (1996 - 1997)
- Colonel Mohammad Wahidul Haque (acting; 1997 – 1998)
- Kazi Moshiur Rahman (1998 - 2000)
- Major General Abdur Rahim (2001 – 5 January 2005)
- Major General Rezzakul Haider Chowdhury (5 January 2005 –2008)
- Major General Sheikh Md Monirul Islam (20 April 2008 – 17 March 2009)
- Brigadier General (rtd) M Manzur Ahmed (17 March 2009 – 25 March 2014)
- Major General Shamsul Haque (25 March 2014 – 31 July 2018)
- Major General T. M. Jobaer (since 31 July 2018 - 3 April 2024)
- Major General Mohammed Hossain Al Morshed (3 April 2024 - 13 August 2024)
- Major General Abu Mohammad Sarwar Farid (13 August 2024 – present)

== Recruitment and training ==
The NSI is predominantly staffed by civilian personnel. Officers are recruited through the Prime Minister's Office, where Class-1 officers, who are directly recruited by the agency, commence their careers as Assistant Directors (Grade-9).

Furthermore, officers may also be seconded from the Bangladesh Police, Armed Forces, and Bangladesh Ansar.

== Operations ==
Yemen

- On 11 February 2022, Lt. Col. (Retd.) Sufiul Anam, a Bangladeshi individual employed by the United Nations, was abducted from Yemen's Mudiah province by members of Al-Qaeda. A ransom of $3 million was demanded for his release. After 18 months in captivity, he was successfully rescued by the National Security Intelligence.

India

- In 2004, NSI operated a hit-to-kill mission against Indian narcotics smugglers, who were accused of being linked with Indian R&AW. The objective was to make it easier to get narcotics for the Bangladeshi youths. Targeted cities were Delhi, Calcutta, Mumbai and Agartala, from where most of the operatives work to smuggle drugs, especially phensedyl, inside Bangladesh. About 17 places and 27 men were eliminated. 1 NSI officer was arrested at the end of the mission. However, the mission was accomplished.

== Controversies ==
=== Human rights abuses ===
According to Human Rights Watch's May 2009 issue, during the 2006–08 Bangladeshi political crisis in Bangladesh, the NSI was actively involved in harassment and arbitrary arrest of labor activists.

=== Killing of Aminul Islam ===
NSI's name had appeared several times during the trial of the mysterious murder of labor rights activist Aminul Islam in April 2012. The only convict, Aminul's friend Mostafijur Rahman, was found to be a mystery man, about whom no one knew much, who apparently had a cover job at an EPZ clinic and regularly met with security officers, is believed to be linked with NSI, though the court has not asked the agency for clarification and nor did the prosecution try to bring them, media has speculated on such controversies, though denied by the agency.

=== Infiltration of R&AW ===
According to Amar Desh report National Security Intelligence came under the influence of an Indian intelligence network from 2009 to 2024 through recruitment, training in India, and placement of personnel in key roles. The claims also allege covert support via an internet service provider company linked to media figures and bypassing technical controls at a major telephone exchange, followed by an inquiry whose outcome is said to be unclear. Further allegations describe extensive patronage-based hiring, including family connections and controversial placements across NSI recruitment batches, and that recruitment processes deteriorated after 2001 with increased inclusion of Bangladesh Chhatra League cadres.

== See also ==
- Bangladeshi intelligence community
- National Committee for Intelligence Coordination
