= Mohammad Wahidul Haque =

- Allegiance: Bangladesh; Pakistan (before 1971)
- Branch: Bangladesh Army; Pakistan Army
- Service years: 1966–1977
- Commands: Director General of National Security Intelligence; Director General of Department of Immigration & Passports; Station Commander, Rangpur
- Conflicts: Bangladesh Liberation War
- Police career
- Allegiance: Bangladesh
- Branch: Bangladesh Police
- Service years: 1978–2005
- Status: Retired
- Rank: Additional Inspector General
- Awards: BPM (bar)

Mohammad Wahidul Haque is a former army and police officer. He is the former director general of National Security Intelligence, the main civilian intelligence agency of Bangladesh.

== Career ==
Haque received a commission in the Pakistan Army in 1966. In 1971, Haque was a captain in the Pakistan Army, stationed in Rangpur Cantonment, East Pakistan. He was the adjutant of the 29th Cavalry Regiment. After the start of the Bangladesh Liberation War in March 1971, his unit launched a crackdown on protests, killing many. He was transferred to West Pakistan. After the independence of Bangladesh in 1971, he returned to Bangladesh and joined the Bangladesh Army in 1973. He was sent into forced retirement from the army.

In October 1978, Haque joined the Bangladesh Police with the rank of assistant superintendent. In 1988, he was appointed the commissioner of Chittagong Metropolitan Police. In 1991, he was appointed director of national security intelligence. In 1996, he became the acting director general of national security intelligence. He served in that capacity till 1997, when he was made the director general of the Department of Immigration and Passports. The appointment was reconfirmed and extended in 2002. In October 2005, he retired from active duty with the rank of additional inspector general of police.

On 24 April 2018, Haque was arrested at his residence in Baridhara DOHS over his role in the Bangladesh genocide during the Bangladesh Liberation War. An investigation into the massacre of Bengali and Santal civilians by soldiers based in Rangpur cantonment began in 2016. On 16 October 2019, the International Crimes Tribunal ordered the beginning of his criminal trial for war crimes. He pleaded not guilty to the charges.

Haque was freed on bail in October 2024 after the fall of the Sheikh Hasina-led Awami League government.
