= Shahriar Kabir =

Bangladeshi journalist, filmmaker and human rights activist

- শাহরিয়ার কবির
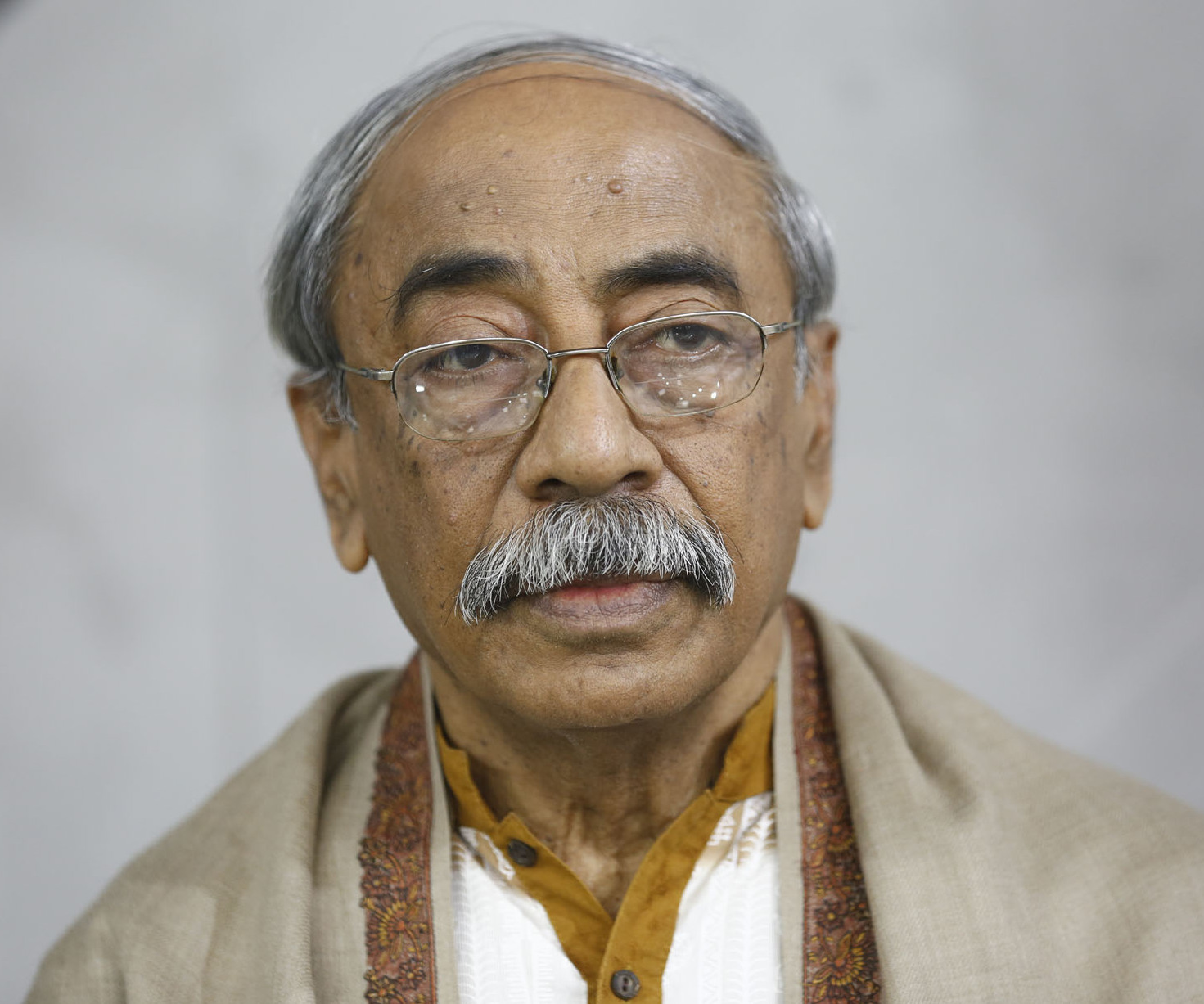
- Kabir in 2023
- Born: 20 November 1950 (age 76); Feni, East Bengal, Dominion of Pakistan
- Education: Jagannath College; University of Dhaka
- Occupations: Journalist, filmmaker, activist, author

Shahriar Kabir (Bengali: শাহরিয়ার কবির; born 20 November 1950) is a Bangladeshi journalist, filmmaker, human rights activist, war crimes researcher and author of more than 70 books focusing on human rights, communalism, fundamentalism, history, and the Bangladesh war of independence. He was awarded Bangla Academy Literary Award in 1995. He is the President of the Ekattorer Ghatak Dalal Nirmul Committee. He is the former president of Forum for Secular Bangladesh. He has cooperated with the renowned anti-racist and anti-fascist group the “Never Again” Association, based in Poland. In 2001, he was recognized by Amnesty International as a prisoner of conscience for his peaceful and non-violent activism in defence of the rights of religious and ethnic minorities. In 2025, due to his arbitrary detention and the risks he faced for his journalistic and human rights work, Shahriar Kabir was recognized by Reporters Without Borders (RWB) as a victim of abuse, and his case was added to their Barometer of press freedom violations. In 2025, the United Nations declared his detention arbitrary, urging for his immediate release and reparations.

== Early life and education ==
Kabir was born in Feni District, Chittagong Division, East Pakistan and now in Bangladesh on 20 November 1950. He attended St Gregory's School. He passed his higher secondary exam from Jagannath College. He was a student of the Department of Bengali at the University of Dhaka. Shariar Kabir was one of the prominent activists of Swadhin Bangla Betar Kendra in Kolkata during Bangladesh Liberation War. He helped to write inspiring script & poems for freedom fighter during the war which were played in Swadhin Bangla Betar Kendra. Then he was a student of Bengali Department of the University of Dhaka. His cousins, Zahir Raihan and Shahidullah Kaiser, was killed in the war.

Kabir started his writings for teenagers and juveniles when he was a university student. After the war, he joined as a journalist in the Daily Bangla and also in the Weekly Bichitra. He was one of the main editors of Weekly Bichitra, which played a vital role for the punishment of liberation war criminals. From 1976 to 1980 he became the general secretary of the organization Bangladesh Lekhak Shibir.

== Career ==
In January 1992, Ekattorer Ghatak Dalal Nirmul Committee (Committee for Resisting Killers and Collaborators of Bangladesh Liberation War of 71) was formed by 101 people. This committee called for the trial of people who committed crimes against humanity in the 1971 Bangladesh Liberation War in collaboration with the Pakistan Army. The Ghatak-Dalal Nirmul Committee set up mock trials in Dhaka in March 1992 known as Gono Adalot (Court of the people) and 'sentenced' persons they accused of being war criminals. Jahanara Imam and 24 others were charged with treason. This charge was, however, dropped in 1996 after her death by the Chief advisor Mohammed Habibur Rahman of the Caretaker government of that time.

Kabir played a major role in formation of Nirmul Committee. The people's court set up by the Ekattorer Ghatak-Dalal Nirmul Committee led by Jahanara Imam was deemed unlawful by the Government of Bangladesh. After the death of Jahanara Imam, he became the acting president of Ghatak Dalal Nirmul Committee in 1994.

Kabir has been active for years as a journalist writing about human rights in Bangladesh. He was arrested twice in the early 2000s for what the government considered illegal attacks. He was first arrested in November 2001, after the government of Khaleda Zia of the Bangladesh National Party had come to power. The government charged him with sedition and "tarnishing the image of the government" because he was investigating attacks on the Hindu minority from October to December 2001 and accused minister of Bangladesh Jamaat-e-Islami of taking part in war crimes during Bangladesh Liberation War. In response, Amnesty International named him a prisoner of conscience in 2001, recognizing his non-violent activism in defense of minority rights. Many Hindus had been intimidated and attacked by party workers during that period in an effort to keep them away from the polls, as they generally did not vote for the Islamist parties. Kabir was documenting accounts by the survivors. Documents and recordings of attacks on Hindu minorities were seized from him by security personnel. In February 2002, a bomb was thrown at a reception for him in Chittagong Press Club, killing one bystander.

In December 2002, Kabir was detained along with historian Muntasir Mamun. As the head of the Nirmul Committee, which he founded in 1992 to work for prosecution of those responsible for genocide and other war crimes during the Bangladesh War of Independence in 1971, Kabir has continued to take an active role. Observers said that the BNP was threatened as its principal political partner, Bangladesh Jamaat-e-Islami has leaders who have been alleged to have participated as in paramilitary forces against liberation in 1971, which the party opposed. When the High Court ruled on 4 January 2003 that Kabir's detention without charges was illegal, the government held him for an additional 90 days under the Armed Forces (Special Powers) Act. Barrister M Amir-ul Islam said, "The behaviour of the government clearly goes against the rule of law and human rights. Furthermore, it is ignoring and violating the High Court order". He was then released on bail in January 2002. He was admitted to Dhaka Community Hospital after his release along with Muntasir Mamun. He was the general secretary of the South Asian People's Union against Fundamentalism and Communalism.

In 2006, Kabir met with former Prime Minister Sheikh Hasina demanding the scrapping of the deal between Awami League and Bangladesh Khelafat Majlish describing the deal as a threat to secular values. He was accompanied by Kabir Chowdhury, Ajoy Roy, Ferdousi Priyabhashini, and Sara Zaker. In November 2007, Kabir called for the creation of a tribunal for the trial of collaborators from the Bangladesh Liberation War. In 2008, the Criminal Investigation Department cleared him of sedition charges from 2001. Judge Mohammad Azizul Haque of the Dhaka Metropolitan Sessions Judge's Court dismissed the sedition charges against him as being fabricated. He called Bangladesh Jamaat-e-Islami the "biggest enemy of Islam" for its role in the Bangladesh Liberation War. In October 2008, he called on the government to reinstall sculptures removed from the front of the Zia International Airport following demands by Islamists. In 2010, the High Court Division started hearing on a petition filed by him and Muntasir Mamun challenging the legality of their detention in 2002. He was the convenor of the Antorjatik Aporadh Tribunal Dhaka Sohayak Moncho.

Kabir has supported efforts by the Awami League-led government, which won a two-thirds majority in the Parliament in December 2008, to establish an International Crimes Tribunal in 2009 to prosecute war crimes. The first trials were completed in early 2013, with three men convicted who have been prominent in Jamaat since the liberation war, which the party opposed. Afterwards he called for a trial and ban on the Jamaat-e-Islami party. Ghulam Azam was also convicted by the International Crimes Tribunal. Kabir alleged that Ghulam Azam, a former leader of Jamaat e Islami at the time of the liberation war, had played an important role in the mass killings of the 1971 conflict, as had Jamaat as a group. He has also said that the Razakars were founded by the Bangladesh Jamaat-e-Islami leader, Maulana A.K.M. Yusuf, and their ID cards were signed by Motiur Rahman Nizami, politician of Bangladesh Jamaat-e-Islami. He testified against Ali Ahsan Mohammad Mojaheed, Secretary General of Bangladesh Jamaat-e-Islami. In 2010, he called for the trial process to be transparent. He was the first prosecution witness in the Ali Ahsan Mohammad Mojaheed. In 2011, he called on Ghulam Arieff Tipoo, Chief Prosecutor of the International Crimes Tribunal, to resign. He criticized strikes by the Bangladesh Nationalist Party and Bangladesh Jamaat-e-Islami as an attempt to stop the International Crimes Tribunal. He created a documentary The Ultimate Jihad, which focused on ties between Bangladesh Jamaat-e-Islami and terrorism. He expressed disappointment over the tribunal not confiscating the assets of convicted war criminals and that organizations were not tried for participating in war crimes.

Kabir was critical of the Awami League government for trying to prevent observation of the International Day of the World's Indigenous Peoples.

Kabir called both the 2015 Dhaka South City Corporation election and the 2015 Dhaka North City Corporation election fair. In January 2017, he was elected president of the Ekattarer Ghatak Dalal Nirmul Committee. He was critical of the collaborator list made by the Ministry of Liberation War in 2019. He created a documentary on the Bangladesh Genocide called Voice of Conscience. In 2020, he called on the United Nations to resettle the Rohingya refugees in Bangladesh to a third country. He called on the government to protect the ancestorial residence of Ramnath Biswas. He warned against Islamic fundamentalism in 2001.

Kabir is author for children and young adult's adventure book genre. He wrote books including Nuliachorir Shonar Pahar, Abuder Adventure, Carpathian er Kalo Golap etc. In May 2024, Kabir called for the creation of National Minority Commission while describing the Awami League governments effort to protect minorities as a failure. Shyamoli Nasrin Chowdhury replaced Kabir as the President of the Ekattorer Ghatak Dalal Nirmul Committee. He called Chief Justice Obaidul Hassan to revive the International Crimes Tribunal which had become dormant.

=== Arrest and detention ===
On 17 September 2024, Kabir was arrested in Dhaka by the Detective Branch of the Dhaka Metropolitan Police on a case over allegations of crimes against humanity and mass killing. He was also accused in a murder case filed over the death of Imran Hossain, a student, at Kutubkhali, Jatrabari. He was placed in remand in the death of two protestors, who died in protests against former Prime Minister Sheikh Hasina, along with journalists Shyamal Dutta and Mozammel Babu. He was later placed in a second remand by Dhaka Metropolitan Magistrate Md Haider Ali. He was interrupted from speaking in court by lawyers aligned with the Bangladesh Nationalist Party. He suffered two heart attacks while in custody, which his family alleged was due to medical negligence. Public Prosecutor Omar Faruq Faruqi opposed his bail on health grounds, stating, "Shahriar Kabir is a named suspect in the case. Under his direction, protesters were shot, leading to injuries and the death of Rafiqul Islam in Jatrabari. He is an atheist and has spoken against Muslims. Atheists support the Awami League, and the Awami League supports them. He is directly involved in this killing.". Represented by his international attorneys Mona Haghgou Strindberg and Tapas Kanti Baul, in November 2025 the United Nations Working Group on Arbitrary Detention (WGAD) declared Shahriar Kabir‘s detention to be arbitrary, citing violations of international law, including the denial of a fair trial, freedom of expression, and due process. The UN recommended his immediate release, compensation, and an independent investigation into his detention, highlighting concerns over his health and the discriminatory nature of the charges against him.

In April 2026, six United Nations Special Procedures mandate holders, including the Special Rapporteurs on freedom of opinion and expression, cultural rights, the rights to freedom of peaceful assembly and of association, the independence of judges and lawyers, and the promotion and protection of human rights while countering terrorism, sent a joint communication to the Government of Bangladesh expressing concern over Shahriar Kabir's continued detention, deteriorating health, repeated denial of bail, and alleged violations of due process and fair trial guarantees.

=== International response ===
On 21 September 2024, a group of human rights defenders, genocide scholars, and writers from around the world sent a letter to Dr. Muhammad Yunus, Chief Advisor of the Interim Government of Bangladesh, urging the release of Shahriar Kabir. The letter was signed by prominent international human rights leaders and genocide scholars, including: Paulo Casaca, Executive Director of the South Asia Democratic Forum (Portugal); Dr. Gregory H. Stanton, Founding President of Genocide Watch and Chair of the Alliance Against Genocide (USA); Heidi Beirich and Wendy Via of the Global Project Against Hate and Extremism (USA); Helen Jarvis, Life Member of the International Association of Genocide Scholars (Cambodia); Dr. Rafal Pankowski, sociologist and cofounder of the “Never Again” Association (Poland); Tarik Günersel, member of the Advisory Board of PEN International Writers for Peace Committee (Turkey); John Feffer, Director of Foreign Policy in Focus (USA); Daniel Feierstein, Director of the Centre of Genocide Studies at the National University of Tres de Febrero and of the Observatory of State Crimes at the University of Buenos Aires (Argentina); Elisa von Joeden-Forgey, Executive Director of Lemkin Institute for Genocide Prevention (USA); Mona Haghgou Strindberg, attorney at law (Sweden); and others. The letter was originally disseminated by the South Asia Democratic Forum and is available online in its updated form.

At the global conference Turning Point: Bangladesh After the July-August Uprising on 29 October 2025, organized by the Global Center for Democratic Governance (GCDG), Rafal Pankowski, the cofounder and chair of the “Never Again” Association and a professor at Collegium Civitas in Warsaw, called Shahriar Kabir a global hero of human rights and minority protection, emphasizing that he had been harassed, criminalized, and imprisoned indefinitely on dubious charges for his lifelong activism.

On 5 January 2026, the Lemkin Institute for Genocide Prevention and Human Security (USA) called for the immediate release of Shahriar Kabir, expressing concern over his detention, health, and alleged violations of his fundamental rights, and urging the Bangladeshi authorities to ensure his release and adequate medical care.

On 6 March 2026, an opinion article published in Foreign Policy in Focus at the Institute for Policy Studies described Kabir as a long-standing advocate of accountability for the 1971 Bangladesh genocide and argued that his case illustrated the gap between political stability and "positive peace" in Bangladesh and reflected broader concerns about the rule of law and human rights.

On 12 March 2026, Genocide Watch, Reporters Without Borders (RSF), the Raoul Wallenberg Centre for Human Rights, the Lemkin Institute for Genocide Prevention and Human Security, Humanists International, the “Never Again” Association, Greek Helsinki Monitor, Antidscrimination Center Memorial Brussels and other organisations and individuals sent an open letter to Bangladeshi Prime Minister Tarique Rahman expressing concern over the detention and health of Kabir and urging him to offer humanitarian bail.

In March 2026, Reporters Without Borders (RSF) included Shahriar Kabir among five journalists it said were arbitrarily detained in Bangladesh and called on the new government to release them and ensure their right to a fair trial.

In 2026, the Committee to Protect Journalists (CPJ) listed Kabir among journalists imprisoned in retaliation for their work, stating that he remained in pretrial detention after being repeatedly denied bail.

Shahriar Kabir's case was also documented in the Network of Concerned Historians Annual Report 2026, issued on 29 July 2026, which summarized his arrest, the opinion of the United Nations Working Group on Arbitrary Detention, the concerns expressed by UN Special Rapporteurs, and international calls for his humanitarian release on bail, placing the case in the broader context of developments affecting historians, journalists, and human rights defenders in Bangladesh following the 2024 political transition.

== Personal life ==
Kabir was married to Dana, sister of Shahadat Chowdhury. He and Shahadat founded Dana Printers in Mohakhali. His cousins include Shahidullah Kaiser, and Zahir Raihan.

Kabir was married to Fatema Kabir (d. 2020). His brother-in-law, Fateh Ali Chowdhury (d. 2024), was a member of the Crack Platoon.

== Works ==
Documentaries

- "Juddhaporadh '71" (War Crimes 71, 2008)
- Muktijudder Gaan(মুক্তিযুদ্ধের গান)
- Cry for justice
- Gonoadalat theke Gonojagoron Mancha
- Kishor Galpa (2017)

Publications

1. Puber Surjo (Juvenile novel), Calcutta 1972,
2. Nuliachhoriyr Sonar Pahar (Juvenile novel), Dhaka 1976
3. Hariye Jayor Thikana (Juvenine novel), Dhaka 1976
4. Comrade Mao Tse-Tung (Biography), Dhaka 1977
5. Abuder Adventure (collection of juvenile stories), Dhaka 1983
6. Ekatturer Jishu (collection of short stories), Dhaka 1986,
7. Oder Janiye Dao (novel), Dhaka 1986,
8. Janaika Protaroker Kahini (collection of short stories), Dhaka 1987,
9. Simante Sanghat (juvenile novel), Dhaka 1988,
10. Enver Hoxhar Smriti (Reminiscence of Enver Hoxa of Albania), Dhaka 1988,
11. Hanabareer Rohos (Juvenile novel), Dhaka 1989,
12. Nicolas Rozarior Chhelera (Juvenile novel), Dhaka 1989,
13. Michhiler akjon (collection of short stories), Dhaka 1989,
14. Pathariar Khoni Rohoshyo (Juvenile novel), Dhaka 1989,
15. Maolana Bhashani (Biography), Dhaka 1989,
16. Mohabipad Sanket (collection of short stories), Dhaka 1990,
17. From Balkan to Batlic (Travelogue), Dhaka 1990,
18. Bangladeshe Samprodaikatar chalchitra (Non fiction), Dhaka 1993.
19. Sadhu Gregorir Dinguli (autobiography), Dhaka 1994,
20. Bangladeshe Moulobad-O-Sangkhaloghhu Samprodye (Essay), Dhaka 1995,
21. Sheikh Mujib-O-Muktijudhher Chetona (Essay), Dhaka 1997,
22. Shantir Pathye Ashanto Parbottyo Chattogram (Essay), Dhaka 1998,
23. Kashmirer Akashey Moulobader Kalomegh (Essay), 1999,
24. Muktijuddher Brittyobondi Itihash (Essay), Dhaka 2000,
25. Ekattorer Gonohattya O Juddhaporddhider Bichar (Essay), Dhaka 2001,
26. Dakshin Asiaye Moulobad (Essay), Dhaka 2001,
27. Pakistan Theke phirey (Travelogue), Dhaka 2002,
28. Bangladeshe Shamprodayik Nirjaton (Essay), Dhaka 2002,
29. Bangladeshe Manobadhikar O Shamprodayekota (Essay) Dhaka-2003,
30. Abaruddhyo Shawdesh Theke (Travelogue), Dhaka 2003,
31. My Sojourn in Pakistan (Travelogue) Dhaka-2003.

=== Edited books ===
1. Genocide 71 (Ed. jointly with Prof. Ahmed Sharif & Prof. Serajul Islam Chowdhury), Dhaka 1989,
2. Bangladesh Genocide After Twenty Years (Ed. jointly with Frank Kerrigon), New York, 1994,
3. Resist Fundamentalism : Focus on Bangladesh, Dhaka, 1995,
4. White Paper : Repression on Religious Minority, Dhaka, 1996.
5. Tormenting Seventy One Dhaka, 1999.

== Allegations ==
Shahrier Kabir has been a subject of controversy due to various perspectives on his actions and beliefs. According to claims made by Kader Siddiqi, a notable freedom fighter and politician, Shahrier Kabir was reputed to have supplied chicken to the Pakistani army during certain historical events, earning him the nickname "Murgi Kabir". This allegation was rejected by Kabir.

Kabir's account of the War of Liberation has been criticized by some as fabricated, with allegations that he uses this narrative to gain favor with the autocratic Hasina regime. These controversies, published by Daily Inqilab, have contributed to varying interpretations of Kabir's role and legacy within the context of Bangladesh's socio-political landscape. Shahriar Kabir has denied these allegations.
