= Shamsul Haque (general) =

Bangladeshi army general

- Military career
- Allegiance: Bangladesh
- Branch: Bangladesh Army; Bangladesh Rifles
- Service years: 1984–2020
- Rank: Lieutenant General
- Unit: East Bengal Regiment
- Commands: Quartermaster General at Army Headquarters; Director General of National Security Intelligence; Chairman of Sena Kalyan Sangstha; GOC of 33rd Infantry Division; Commander of 72nd Infantry Brigade

Shamsul Haque is a retired Bangladesh Army lieutenant general who is the former QMG of Bangladesh Army.

== Career ==
Haque has also served as the defence advisor in Bangladesh Permanent Mission of United Nations Headquarters, New York. He also served as commanding officer of 6 Rifle Battalion in Bangladesh Rifles (now Border Guard Bangladesh).

Haque was the previous chairman of Sena Kalyan Sangstha. He was made the chairman of Sena Kalyan Sangstha on 15 May 2014. Shams was commissioned in the 10th BMA Long Course in June 1984. Under him construction of a new headquarters of the NSI in Segun Bagicha started in 2015.

Haque was the director general of National Security Intelligence until July 2018.
