= Muntassir Mamoon =

Bangladeshi writer

Muntasir Mamoon
- মুনতাসীর মামুন
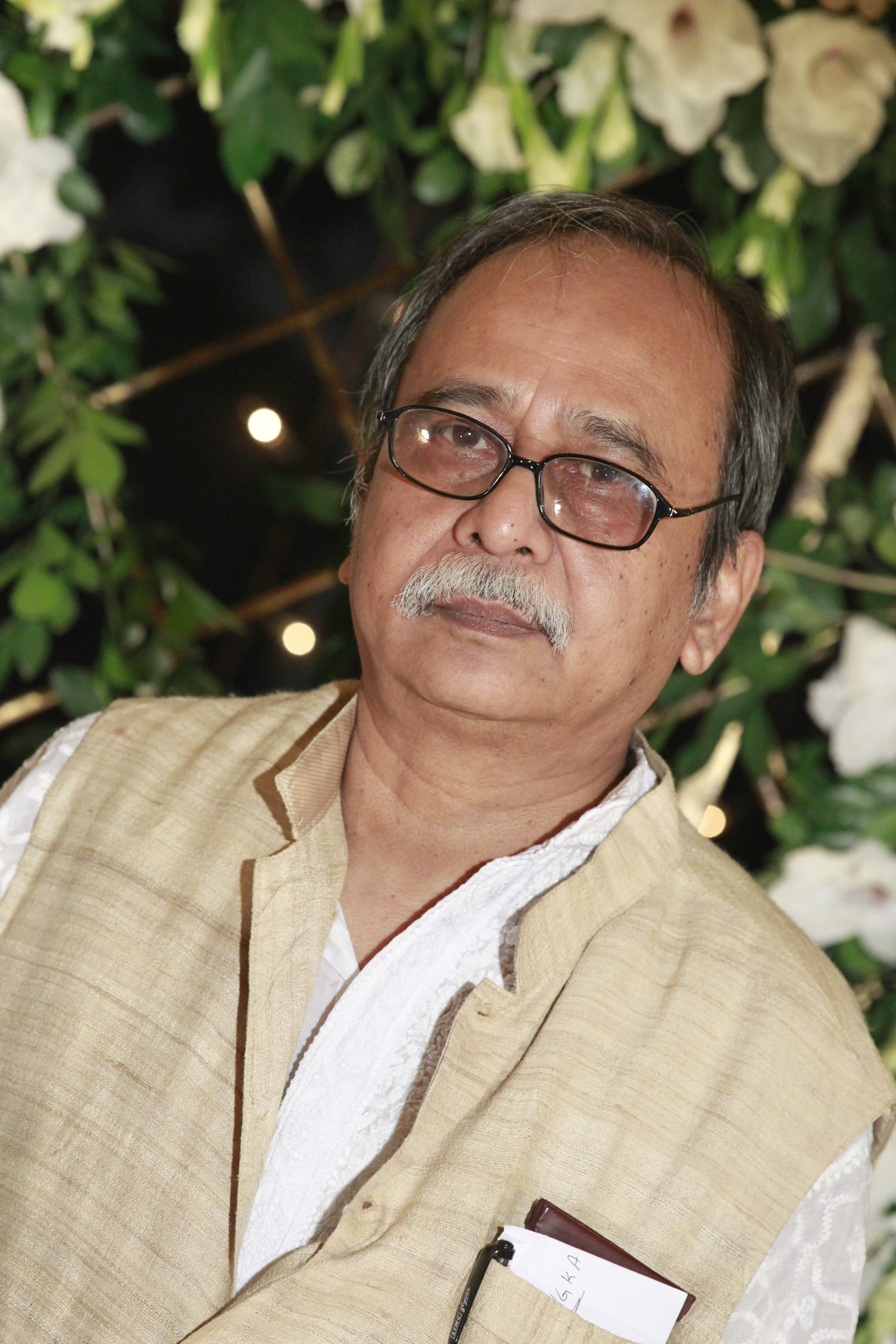
- Born: 1951 (age 74–75)
- Education: Dhaka University (PhD)
- Occupations: author, researcher, translator
- Spouse: Fatema Mamoon (died 2026)
- Awards: Bangla Academy Literary Award; Ekushey Padak

Muntasir Mamoon (born 1951) his full name is Muntasir Uddin Khan Mamun, he is a Bangladeshi writer, historian, scholar, secularist, translator, and professor at University of Dhaka. He was awarded Bangla Academy Literary Award and Ekushey Padak by the government of Bangladesh.

== Early life and education ==
Mamoon was born in 1951. He earned his M.A. and Ph.D. degree from the Department of History of the University of Dhaka.

== Career ==
Mamoon mainly worked on the historical city of Dhaka. He wrote several books about this city, took part in movements to protect Dhaka. Among his historical works on 1971 is his Sei Sob Pakistani, in which many interviews with leading Pakistanis was published. Most of them were the leading Pakistani characters during the liberation war of Bangladesh.

In 2009, Mamoon and General KM Safiullah filed a petition with the Bangladesh High Court asking it to direct the government to maintain the historic locations at Suhrawardy Udyan and all over Bangladesh. Justices A. B. M. Khairul Haque and Md. Mamtaz Uddin Ahmed of the High Court Division issued a verdict in favor of the petitioners asking the government to preserve historical sites. He is the vice president of Ekatturer Ghatak Dalal Nirmul Committee, advocacy group for the trial of War Criminals of Bangladesh Liberation War.

In 2012, Mamoon appeared as a prosecution witness at International Crimes Tribunal-1 which was engaged by the Bangladesh Government to try the war criminals of 1971. In his witness's account, Mamoon said that members of the Peace Committee used to advise Pakistani military leaders about where and how to strike the freedom fighters of Bangladesh.

Mamoon is the Bangabandhu chair at the University of Chittagong. He is the chairman of the trustee board of 1971: Genocide and Torture Archive and Museum in Khulna.

== Criticism and lawsuits ==
He received criticism for endorsing Islamophobic activities referenced in Shah Ahmad Shafi's open letter named An Open Letter from Shah Ahmad Shafi to the Government and the Public related to the Shahbag protests in 2013.

Gazi MH Tamim, a lawyer of Bangladesh Supreme Court filed genocide charges against him at the International Crimes Tribunal over the police raid on 2013 Shapla Square protests of Hefazat-e-Islam Bangladesh on 20 August 2024. In October 2026, University of Chittagong cancelled his appointment to the "Bangabandhu Chair," according to Pro-Vice Chancellor Mohammed Shamim Uddin Khan.

== Awards ==
- Bangla Academy Literary Award
- Ekushey Padak, 2010
- Lekhak Shibir Puroskar
- Agrani Bank Award
- Dr. Hilali Gold Medal
- President's Award, 1963
- Mercantile Bank Gold Medal
