= December 2025 Bangladesh violence =

Political violence in the aftermath of Osman Hadi's assassination

- Part of the Aftermath of the July Uprising and the Bangladesh post-resignation violence (2024–2026)
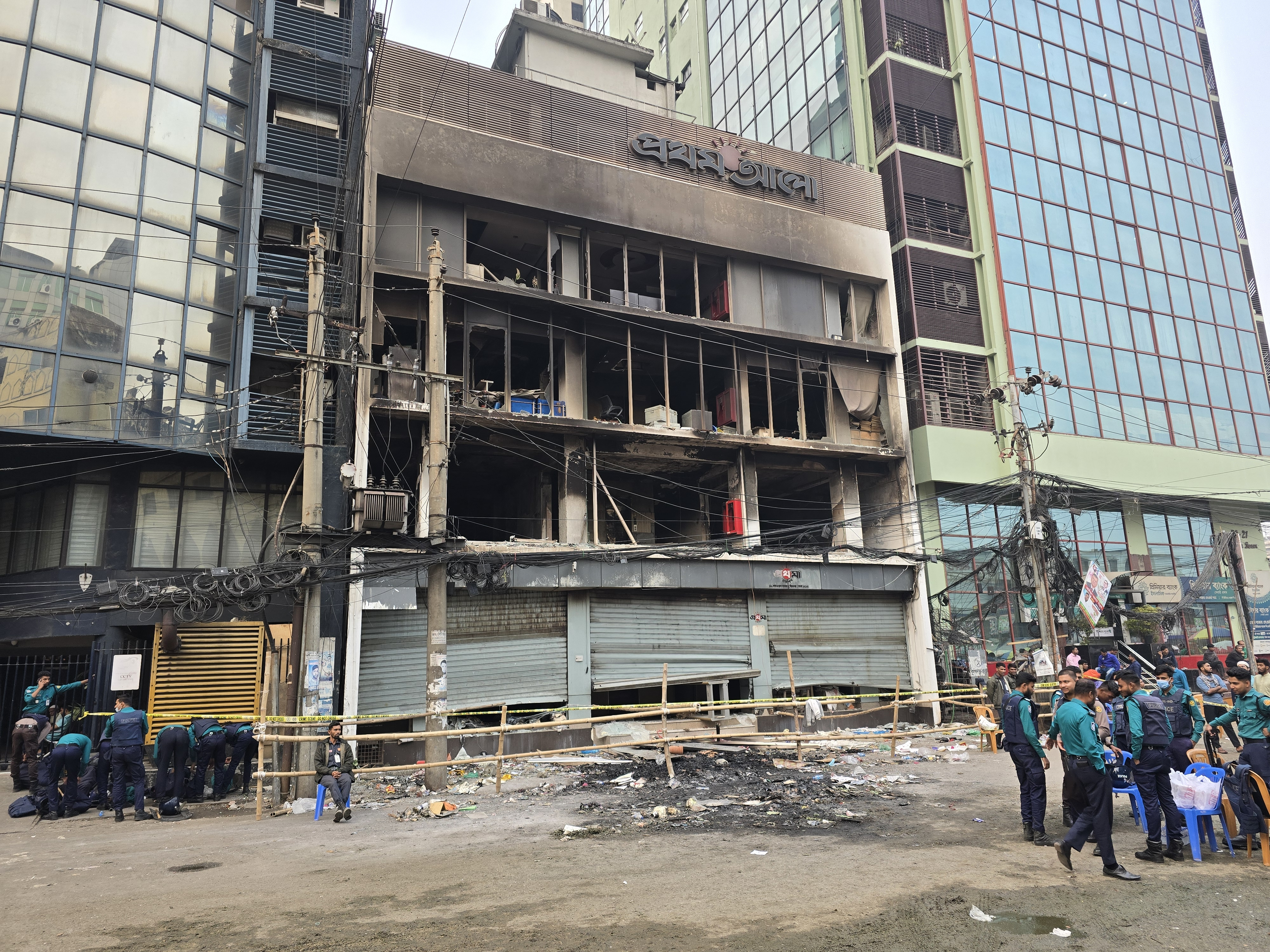
- Burned exterior of Daily Prothom Alo's head office
- Location: Bangladesh
- Date: 18–20 December 2025 (2 days)
- Target: Offices and journalists of Prothom Alo and The Daily Star; Remnants of Bangabandhu Memorial Museum; Chhayanaut and Bangladesh Udichi Shilpigoshthi; Awami League, BNP and Jatiya Party politicians' houses and offices; Indian high commission and assistant high commissions
- Attack type: Political violence; Demonstrations; Vandalism; Arson; Riots
- Motive: Revenge for Osman Hadi's assassination; Anti-Awami League sentiment; Anti-India sentiment; Opposition to Indian influence in Bangladesh; Islamic extremism; Ultranationalism

Between 18 and 20 December 2025, a series of riots, arson attacks, and political unrest occurred across Bangladesh following the assassination of Osman Hadi, the spokesperson of the Inqilab Moncho. Hadi died on 18 December after being shot six days earlier. Since the announcement of his death, violent mobs have targeted various civic and cultural institutions, including the offices of the national dailies Prothom Alo and The Daily Star, and cultural centres including Chhayanaut and Bangladesh Udichi Shilpigoshthi. Diplomatic missions of India and Awami League-related sites have also been targeted.

== Background ==
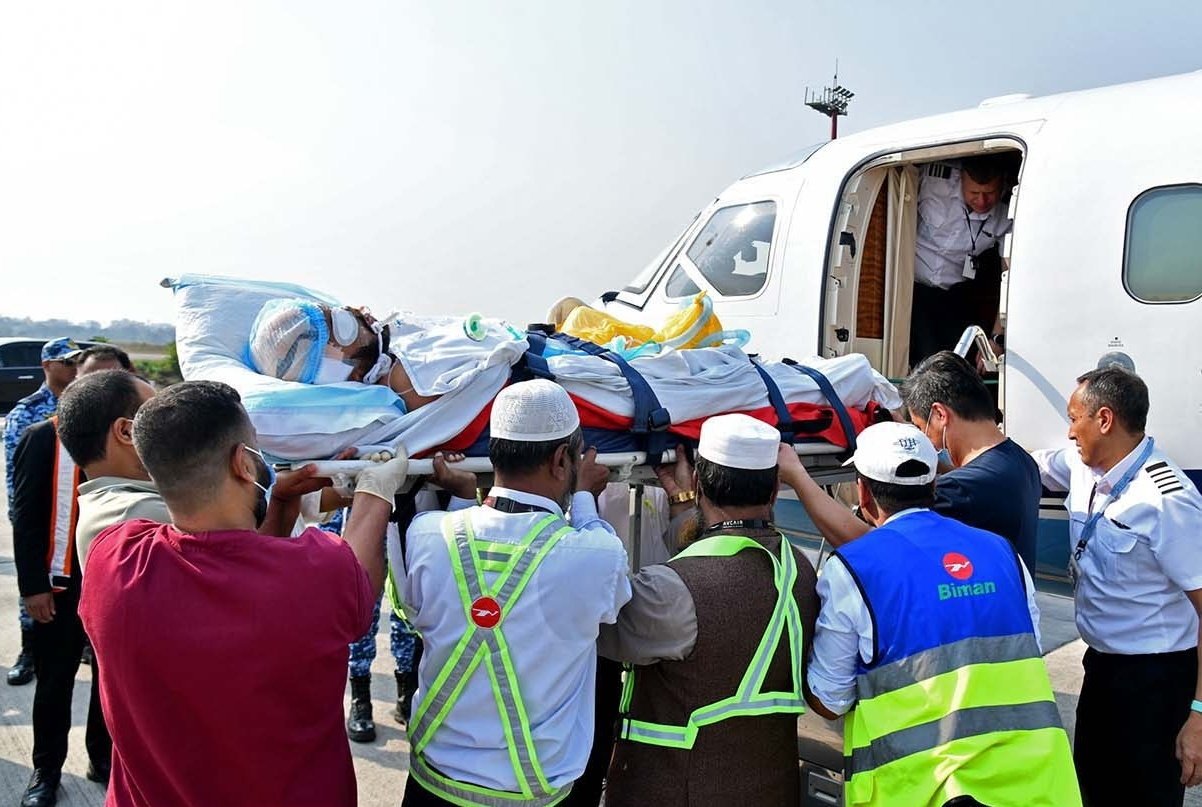
Osman Hadi being transported to Singapore via air ambulance in Hazrat Shahjalal International Airport, Dhaka

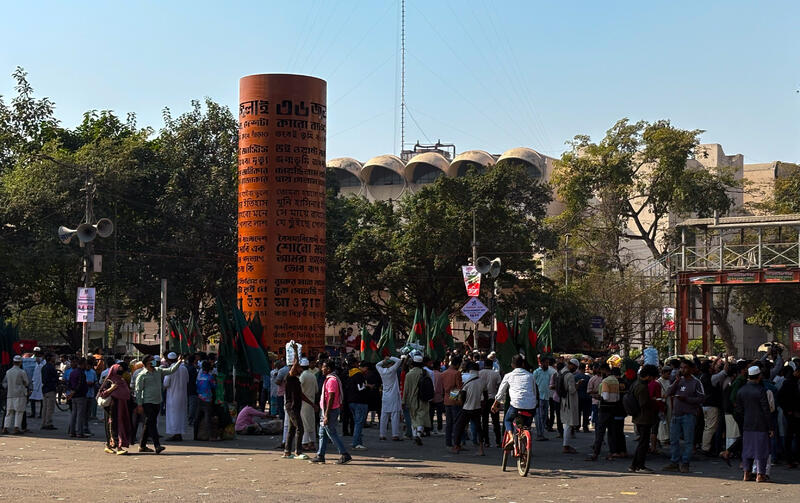
Supporters of Hadi protesting his death at Shahbag, Dhaka

Osman Hadi was a Bangladeshi politician and activist known for his anti-India and anti-Awami League positions, as well as populist criticism of the political establishment. He was the founding leader of Inqilab Moncho, an organization established in the Aftermath of the July Uprising to preserve the movement's ideals.

On 12 December 2025, Hadi was shot by unidentified assailants. These individuals were later identified as members of the Chhatra League, the student wing of the Awami League, which had been outlawed in Bangladesh since August 2024. Reports indicated that the assailants fled Bangladesh to take shelter in India. On 18 December, Hadi succumbed to his gunshot wounds at Singapore General Hospital. Before the outbreak of violence, nationwide demonstrations were held in various locations across the country.

== Violence ==
=== Violence against media ===
On the night of 18 December, Mostakur Rahman, vice-president of RUCSU and a leader of Islami Chhatra Shibir, called for the shutdown of Prothom Alo and The Daily Star at a protest rally in Rajshahi; his remarks circulated widely on social media. That night, a mob of protesters marched from Shahbagh to the Karwan Bazar area, targeting the headquarters of Prothom Alo (Pragati Bhaban). Witnesses reported that the attackers scaled the building's grille, vandalized the reception area, and set fire to furniture and documents at the entrance.

Subsequently, the mob moved to the nearby building of The Daily Star. Attackers, described by witnesses as chanting "Nara-e-Takbeer" and "Allahu Akbar", breached the main gate and vandalized the ground and first floors. They set the lobby ablaze before stealing many office amenities, trapping approximately 25 to 28 journalists and staff on the roof due to rising toxic smoke. The besieged journalists were later rescued by the fire service and the army. Nurul Kabir, the editor of New Age, stated that he was physically assaulted and branded an "Indian agent" by the angry mob when he attempted to intervene. Mahfuz Anam described the incident as deliberate and violent, referring to a video circulating on social media in which the attackers were allegedly heard threatening to kill journalists from The Daily Star and Prothom Alo at their homes.

The Newspaper Owners’ Association of Bangladesh (NOAB) and the Editors' Council jointly protested in a rally titled "Bangladesh Under Mob Violence."

=== Attacks on cultural sites ===
Following the news of the death of Sharif Osman Hadi, Mostafizur Rahman—secretary of the Bangladesh Islami Chhatra Shibir unit at Jahangirnagar University has addressed a protest rally on 18 December. Rahman stated that "true independence" for Bangladesh required a "cultural struggle" rather than just a political one. He called for the dismantling of the "cultural hegemony" of organizations such as Chhayanaut and Bangladesh Udichi Shilpigoshthi. Additionally, he demanded the severance of diplomatic ties with India and the expulsion of Indian nationals from Bangladesh until former Prime Minister Sheikh Hasina was extradited.

Following criticism on social media regarding his use of the word tosh-nosh (dismantle/devastate), Rahman issued a clarification via Facebook. He stated that the term was not intended to incite violence but referred to challenging "fascist narratives" through systematic and institutional means. He characterized the struggle as disciplined and constitutional.

In the early hours of 19 December, unidentified attackers targeted the Chhayanaut Sangskriti Bhaban in Dhanmondi. The attackers vandalized the auditorium and set fire to classrooms of the Nalonda school. Witnesses reported that the perpetrators chanted Islamic slogans and justified the attacks by labeling Chhayanaut as a "promoter of Indian culture".

On 19 December, a fire broke out at the central office of Bangladesh Udichi Shilpigoshthi on Topkhana Road in Dhaka. Udichi leader Amit Ranjan Dey alleged the fire was deliberate, though the Fire Service had not confirmed the cause.

=== Attacks on individual persons and houses ===
On 18 December, a Hindu man named Dipu Chandra Das was lynched and burned alive in Bhaluka Upazila after false allegations of blasphemy. On 19 December, the residence of a BNP joint organizing secretary, was set on fire in Bhavaniganj Union, Lakshmipur Sadar. The family was inside the building at the time. The fire resulted in the death of one child, and injuries to other members of the family. An 18-year-old girl who had suffered 90 percent burns died at the Burn Institute on December 25 after battling for her life for six days. After 10:30 p.m. on 18 December, miscreants set fire to houses owned by Bangladesh Television (BTV) Director General Md. Mahbubul Alam Goura and International Crimes Tribunal prosecutor Tanvir Hasan Zoha in Magura.

=== Destruction of political and diplomatic sites ===
Protesters also targeted the site of the Bangabandhu Memorial Museum (Dhanmondi 32), which had been demolished during the August 2024 uprising. The mob damaged the remaining debris and burned posters of Sheikh Hasina.

In Chittagong, protesters clashed with police while attempting to storm the Assistant High Commission of India. Separately, mobs set fire to the residences of the late former mayor Mohiuddin Chowdhury and former education minister Mohibul Hasan Chowdhury Naufel. On 19 December, house of Anisul Islam Mahmud, chairman of Jatiya Party faction and National Democratic Front, was vandalized and arsoned at around 11.40 pm.

In Rajshahi, demonstrators bulldozed a local Awami League office and attempted to march on the Indian diplomatic mission before being intercepted by police. In Bandarban, the house of the former minister of Chittagong Hill Tracts affairs and Awami League politician Ushwe Sing was set ablaze.

=== Diplomatic and political fallout ===
The violence was characterized by strong anti-India sentiment. Leaders of the National Citizen Party (NCP) issued statements describing the situation as a "war" and demanded the closure of the Indian High Commission until Hadi's "killers" were returned. In response to security threats, Indian authorities temporarily closed their visa centres in Rajshahi and Khulna.

Inqilab Moncho warned it would launch a movement to oust the interim government, a warning issued by member secretary Abdullah Al Jaber at an emergency press conference at Shahbag.

== Reactions ==
=== Government ===
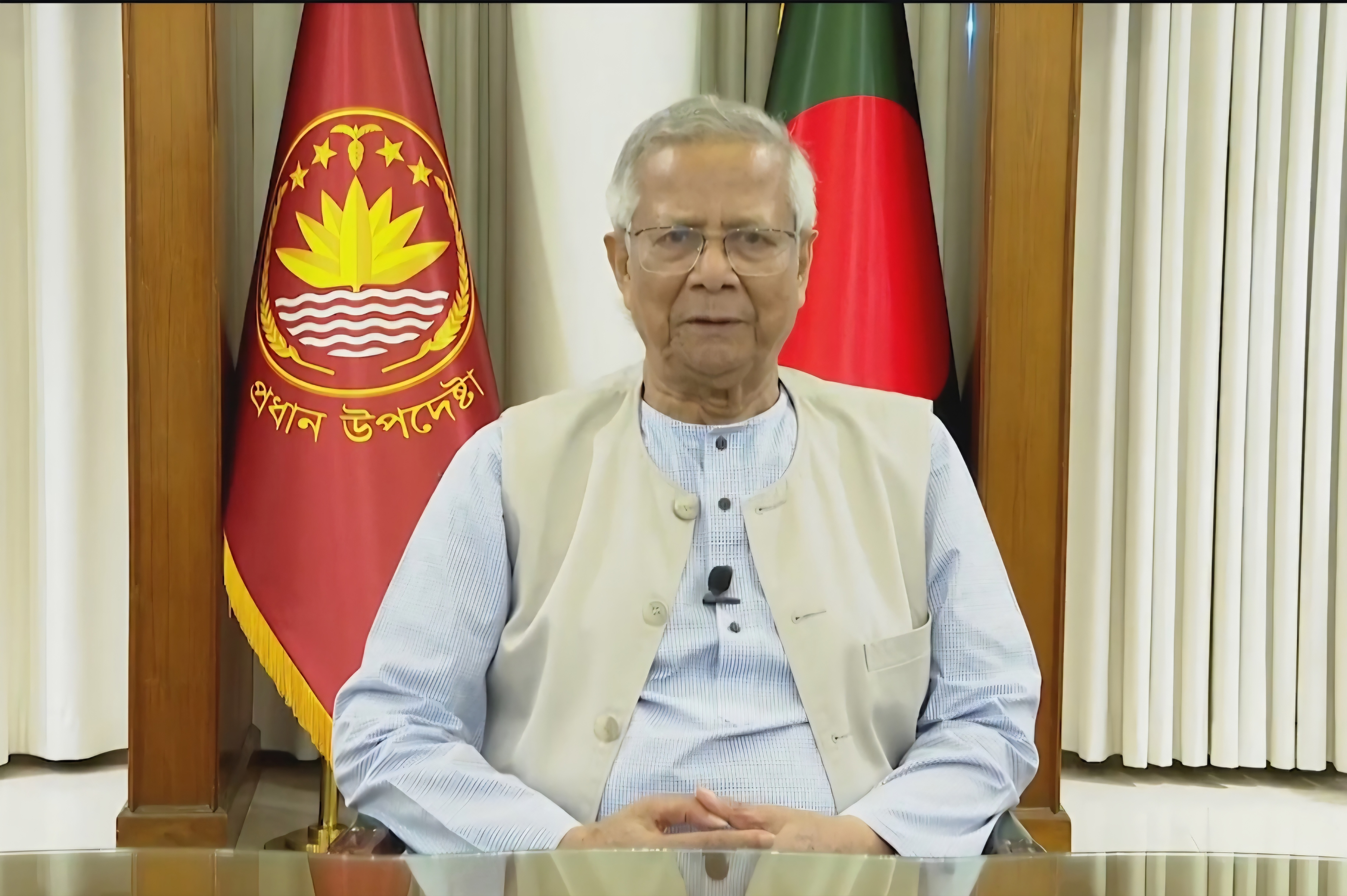
Chief Adviser Muhammad Yunus addressing the nation following the death of Osman Hadi

Chief Adviser of Bangladesh Muhammad Yunus personally spoke with the editors of Prothom Alo and the Daily Star, ensuring their personal safety and the protection of the media outlets. He described the attacks on the national dailies as "tantamount to an attack on independent media," stating that the incident created "a major obstacle to the country's democratic progress." He urged to "resist all forms of mob violence committed by fringe elements" nationwide.

The government increased the presence of law enforcement agencies in major cities, including the police and Border Guards Bangladesh (BGB) units. Officials stated that security measures were necessary to prevent further escalation, while some opposition figures and civil society groups questioned the proportionality of the state response. Election commissioner Abul Fazal Md. Sanaullah stated that the joint forces of the police, Rapid Action Battalion (RAB) and the army will conduct regular operations until the 2026 general election to ensure public safety.

Special assistant for the home affairs ministry, Khoda Baksh Chowdhury had to resign for failing to control the deteriorating law and order situation.

=== Non-government ===
The attacks were condemned by several organizations, including the Newspaper Owners' Association of Bangladesh (NOAB), the Editors' Council, and Transparency International Bangladesh. The Media Freedom Coalition expressed deep concern and condemned the violence, stating that such actions undermine press freedom and violate the public's right to information.

Bangladesh Nationalist Party (BNP) leader Salahuddin Ahmed condemned the violence against media houses, calling it "mobocracy". National Citizen Party (NCP) leader Nahid Islam accused that an internal faction within the interim government was responsible for the attack.

UN Special Rapporteur Irene Khan condemned the mob attacks, describing them as deeply alarming and calling for prompt and effective investigations and accountability. She said the arson and vandalism reflected a dangerous weaponization of public anger against journalists and artists. Khan warned that such violence could have a chilling effect on media freedom, minority voices, and dissent, particularly ahead of elections, and attributed the attacks to a failure by the interim government to address impunity and protect media and artistic freedom.

=== Protests ===
Chhayanaut organized musical protests on 19 December in Sankar, Dhaka. Bangladesh Jatiotabadi Chatradal organized protest against mob violence in the University of Dhaka on 21 December. Udichi organized nationwide protests on 23 December against the assassination of Hadi, lynching of Dipu Chandra Das, child rape in Magura, and attacks on media houses and cultural organizations. Several journalists, businessmen, human rights and cultural activists led by the Newspaper Owners Association Bangladesh (NOAB) organized protests against the violence in front of Pan Pacific Sonargaon on 22 December.

== See also ==
- Demolition of Dhanmondi 32
- Sheikh Mujibur Rahman statue destruction
- Trial of Sheikh Hasina
- Lynching of Dipu Chandra Das
