= Sheikh Mujibur Rahman's cult of personality =

Cult of personality surrounding the first president of Bangladesh

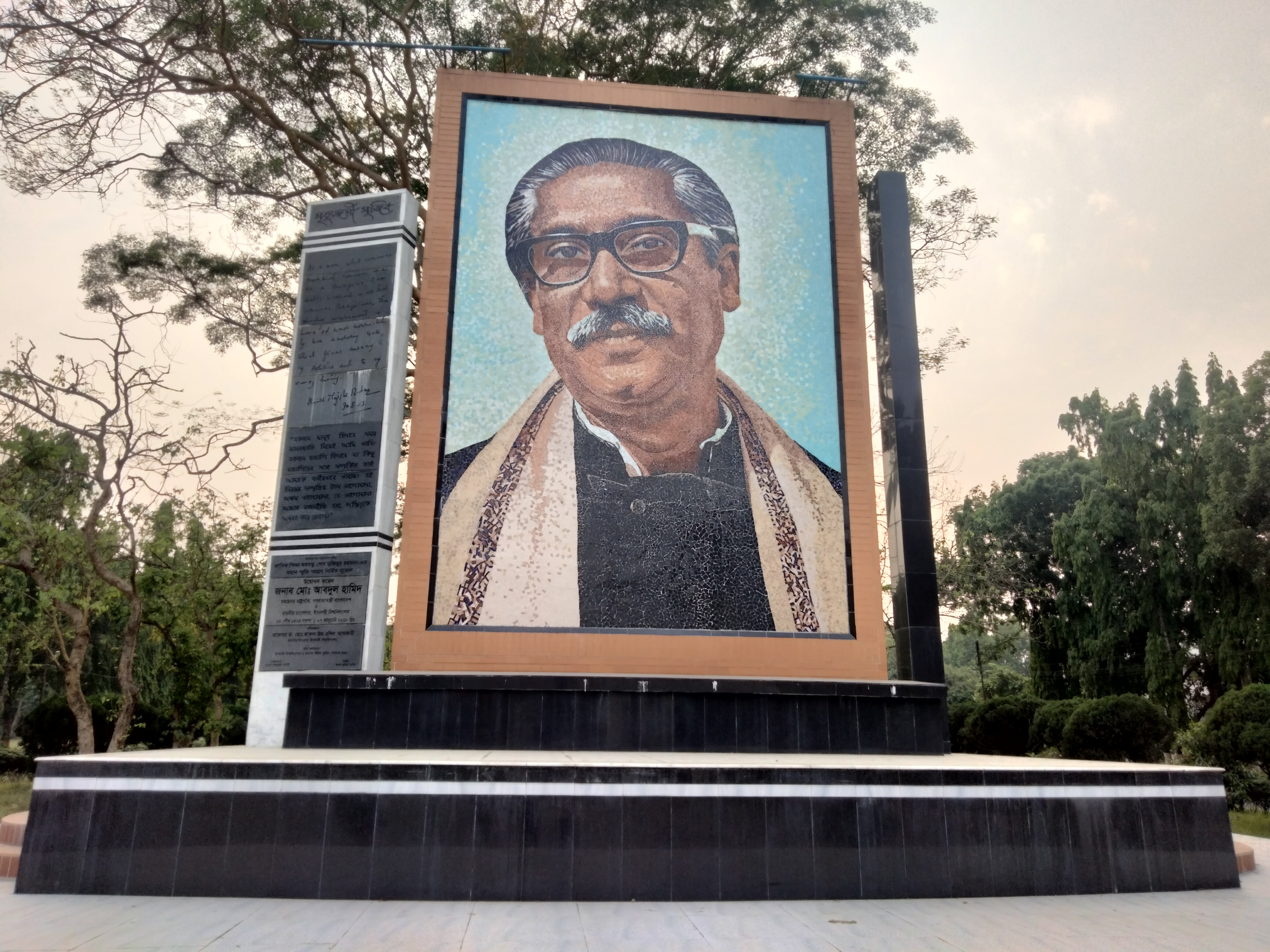
Mritunjoyi Mujib at Islamic University in Kushtia. It was demolished after the July Uprising in August 2024.

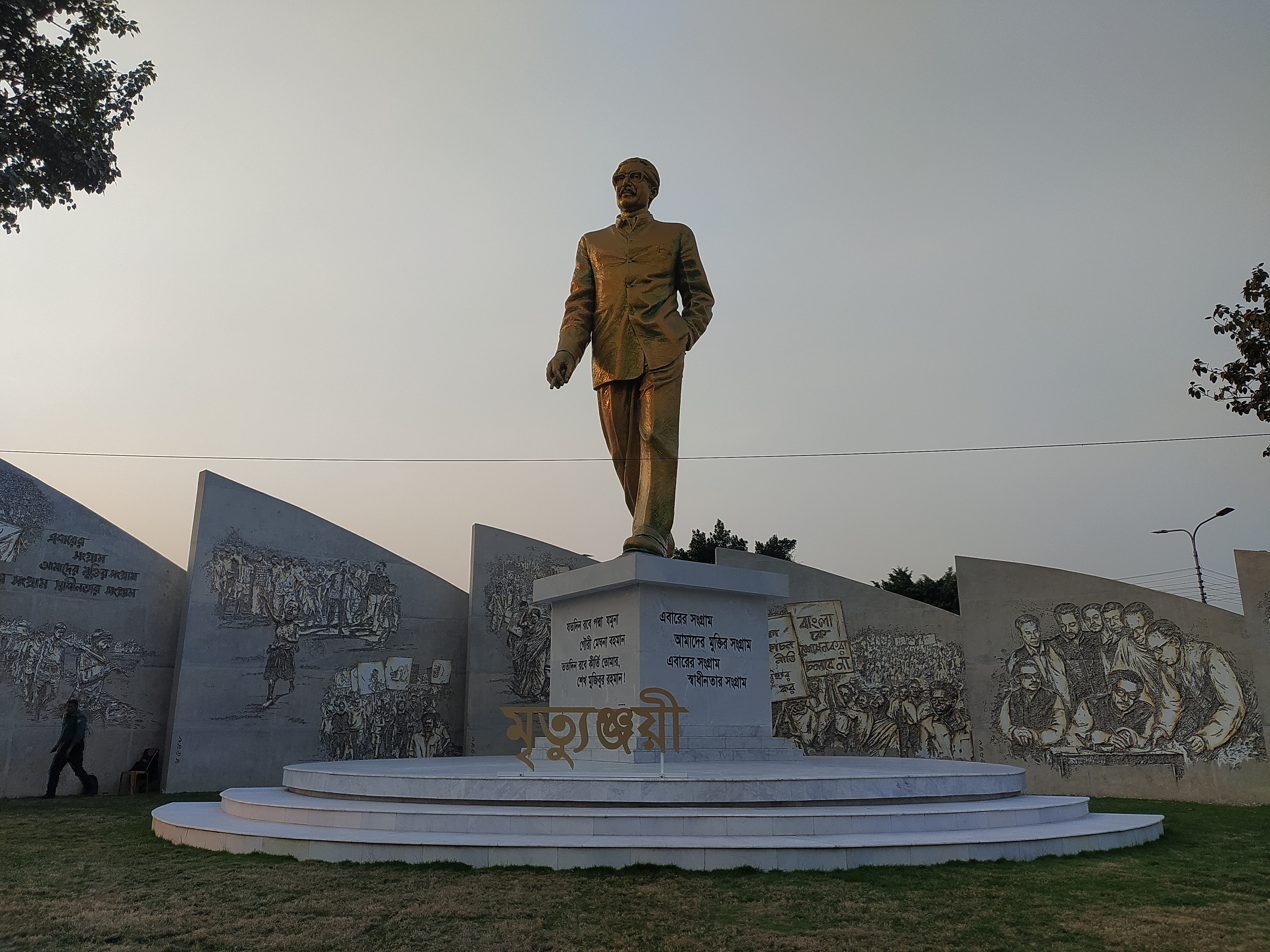
Sheikh Mujibur Rahman's sculpture at the Mrityunjayee Prangan in Bijoy Sarani, Dhaka. This sculpture was demolished by the protesters after the July Uprising.

The cult of personality around Bangladesh's founding President Sheikh Mujibur Rahman was started during the premiership of the Sheikh Hasina-led Awami League government. Mujibism or the political ideology of Sheikh Mujibur Rahman, was gradually converted into a cult of personality around him during the tenure of his daughter Sheikh Hasina, former Prime minister of Bangladesh. After her fall following the July Uprising, his cult of personality was gradually dismantled.

== Overview ==
A cult of personality was created around Sheikh Mujibur Rahman during his tenure, where his supporters venerate him. After being pushed to the sidelines by the successive military rulers Ziaur Rahman (who founded the Bangladesh Nationalist Party) and Hussain Muhammad Ershad (who founded the Jatiya Party), It came back to dominate public consciousness from 2008 under the Awami League government led by Hasina. Hasina was criticised for overemphasising the role of her father and the Awami League in securing Bangladeshi independence at the cost of sidelining other prominent contemporaries and political parties.

During her tenure, Hasina amended the constitution to make the presence of Sheikh Mujibur Rahman portrait mandatory in every school, government office and diplomatic mission of the country and made it illegal to criticise, his ideals and his deeds, especially his one-party BAKSAL regime, through writing, speech or electronic media. The Awami League government spent 40 billion to build around ten thousand sculptures and artistic depictions of him throughout the entire country. In 2021, more than 1,220 sculptures were made to celebrate his 100th birthday. Many events commemorating the birth-centenary of Mujib in his lifetime were launched by the Hasina administration, including an official biopic in collaboration with the Indian government. The Hasina government expanded the Bangabandhu Memorial Museum in the capital city of Dhaka, where he and his family was assassinated by military personnel in 1975. Hasina designated the day of Mujib's assassination as the National Day of Mourning. The Hasina government also made the birthdays of Sheikh Mujibur Rahman, his wife Sheikh Fazilatunnesa Mujib, eldest son Sheikh Kamal and youngest son Sheikh Russel as official government holidays, alongside March 7 (the anniversary of Mujib's declaration of Bangladesh's secession at a speech in Dhaka). Under Hasina's rule, the country was dotted with numerous statues of him alongside several roads and prominent institutions named after him. "Mujib Corners" were set up in various government offices, banks and educational institutions, which featured books, memoirs and images related to Sheikh Mujibur Rahman. Many institutional heada, taking this as an opportunity to flatter the authorities, placed some books and pictures of him in a corner of their offices and declared them Mujib Corners. During the period, many budding writers rushed to write books on Sheikh Mujibur Rahman. These low-quality books, lacking readership, were published and sold to government libraries.

Critics state that Hasina utilises the personality cult around her father to justify her own authoritarianism, crackdown on political dissent and democratic backsliding of the country. Describing the naming of government projects after the members of the Sheikh family, Executive Director of the Institute for Inclusive Finance and Development Mostafa K Muzeri noted:

The psychology behind this was, firstly, it would be easier to get the approval of projects containing Sheikh family's names. Apart from this, components [of those projects] weren't checked toughly. Besides, there were opportunities to get exemption doing irregularities and corruption at the implementation stage [of those projects]. Combinedly speaking, there were opportunities to steal [wealth from the projects] having Sheikh family's names.

== Dismantlement ==
Following the resignation of Sheikh Hasina in August 2024, the cult of personality around Sheikh Mujibur Rahman is being systematically dismantled. Just after the fall of Awami League government, protesters toppled the Golden statue of Sheikh Mujibur Rahman in Bijoy Sarani, Dhaka, which received live coverage around the world.

Places and infrastructure named after him and his family members were gradually renamed, including hospitals, public universities, textile colleges, schools, military establishments, transport infrastructure such as Jamuna Bridge and Karnaphuli Tunnel, colleges and sports infrastructure. Biographies of Sheikh Mujibur Rahman and his family members were replaced by the biographies of Kazi Nazrul Islam, Rabindranath Tagore, Maulana Abdul Hamid Khan Bhashani and four national leaders in elementary textbooks. The Bangladeshi government also decided to remove the portrait of Sheikh Mujibur Rahman from the banknotes of the Bangladeshi taka.

On 5 February 2025, protesters demolished the Bangabandhu Memorial Museum, following a speech of Sheikh Hasina perceived as provocative by many.

In October 2024 the Yunus ministry announced the cancellation of several national observances that had commemorated events associated with Sheikh Mujibur Rahman, including the anniversary of his 7 March 1971 speech and 15 August (National Mourning Day), a move that commentators described as a deliberate rolling back of state-sanctioned rituals that had reinforced his near-sacred status in public life.

Following the political changes of 2024–2025, Bangladeshi media outlets were allowed to report more critically on Sheikh Mujibur Rahman, including analyses of his policies and the BAKSAL era, reversing years of self-censorship and restrictions under Awami League rule.

== Analysis ==
Most analysts think that Sheikh Mujibur Rahman historical legacy was affected due to the authoritarian rule of Sheikh Hasina and the Awami League, which elevated him to an cult-like figure above criticism and narrowed his status from a national founding father into a one-sided Awami League partisan figure.

- According to Dhaka University professor Shamim Reza,
  The Hasina government was motivated to create a "one-sided political character" around Sheikh Mujib that sidelined other figures important to Bangladesh's struggle for independence.
- CPB leader Mujahidul Islam Selim said,

Hasina is creating a "fabricated narrative" around Sheikh Mujib that ultimately contributed to turning him into a controversial party figure rather than a national leader.

- According to Political analyst Anu Muhammad,

It is divided the post-resignation attacks on Sheikh Mujib's legacy into two phases: the spontaneous phase — which occurred immediately after the resignation of Hasina due to public sentiment against her. and the political phase — which occurred later due to ideological politics and that even affected the legacy of the Bangladesh Liberation War, as groups opposed to the Liberation War took advantage of the situation.

- BBC Bangla also noted that this created confusion among the younger generation over the evaluation of Mujib's role in the history of Bangladesh.

== See also ==
- List of artistic depictions of Sheikh Mujibur Rahman
- List of things named after Sheikh Mujibur Rahman
- List of cults of personality
  - Mustafa Kemal Atatürk's cult of personality
  - Saparmurat Niyazov's cult of personality
  - Mao Zedong's cult of personality
  - North Korean cult of personality
- List of things named after Ziaur Rahman
- List of things named after Sheikh Hasina
