= Bangladesh Military Museum =

Military Museum in Dhaka, Bangladesh

- বাংলাদেশ সামরিক জাদুঘর

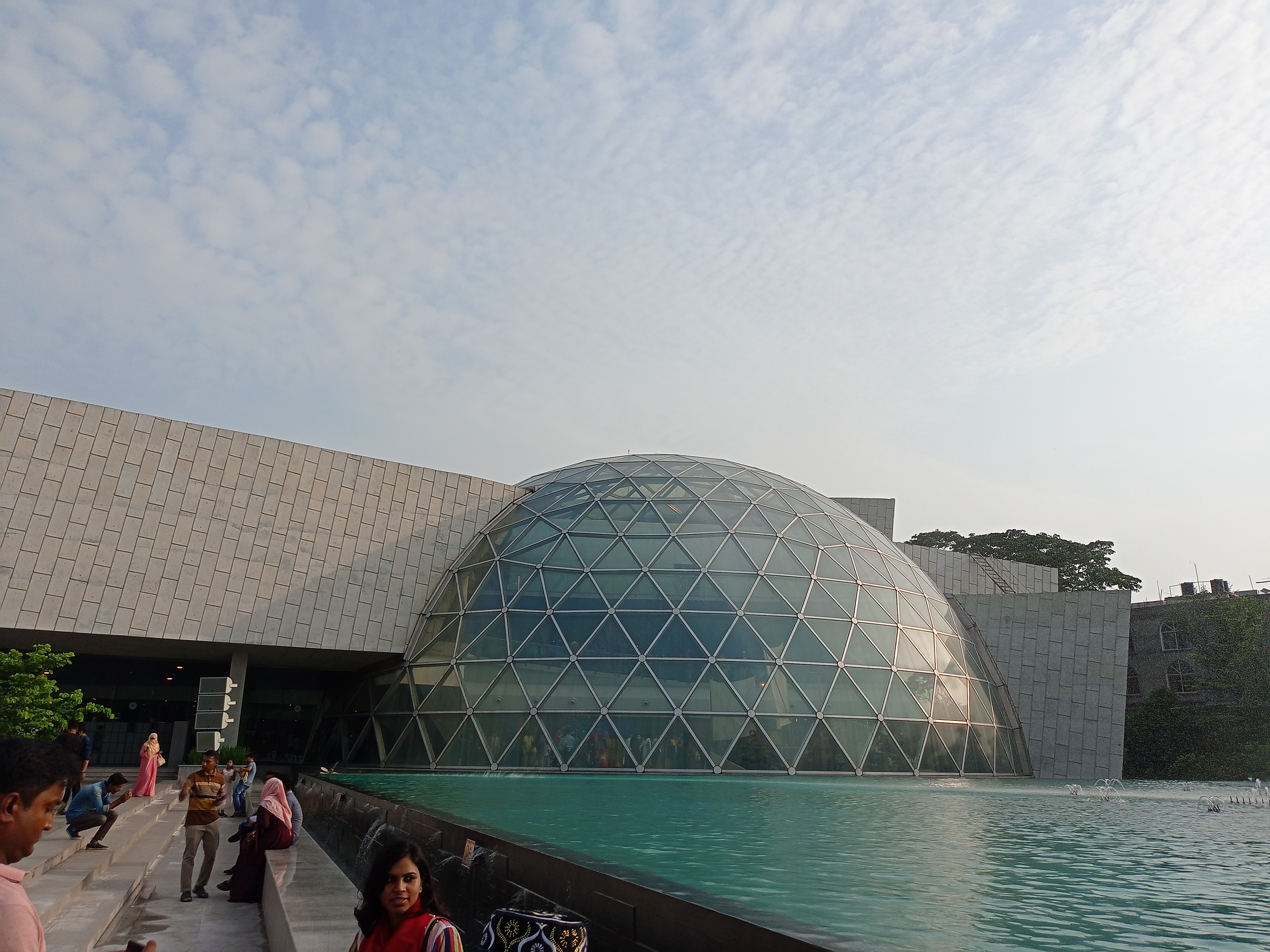
- Main building of the museum
- Former name: Bangabandhu Military Museum
- Established: 1987; 39 years ago
- Location: Bijoy Sarani Avenue, Tejgaon, Dhaka, Bangladesh
- Coordinates: 23.7638°N 90.3858°E
- Type: Military
- Curator: Bangladesh Army
- Website: bangladeshmilitarymuseum.org

Bangladesh Military Museum is a military museum in Dhaka, Bangladesh. Administered by the Bangladesh Army, the museum is located next to the Novo Theatre at Bijoy Sarani of the capital Dhaka. The museum has a collection of exhibits related to Bangladesh's military history, heritage, success stories and various weapons and ammunition. It is popular among the youth and other citizens.

== History ==
The museum was established in 1987 as Bangladesh Military Museum. It was permanently moved in its current location at Bijoy Sarani in 1999. It has a collection of vehicles and weapons rescued from the then Pakistan Army after the Bangladesh Liberation War. Following the fall of the Sheikh Hasina led Awami League government in August 2024, Bangabandhu Military Museum was renamed to its previous name Bangladesh Military Museum.

== Design and layout ==
The museum is a joint venture project of, Ali Imam (Architect), Bayejid Mahbub Khondker (Architect), Nakshabid Architects (an architectural consultancy firm), Design Work Group (DWG), Mukta Dinwiddie Maclaren Architects (MDM), Foster Lomas Architects (FLA) and exhibition designers Real Studios combinedly worked on the museum's interior and exterior.

The museum is divided in to six sections, including the Bangladesh History Gallery on the ground floor, Bangladesh Army Gallery on the 2nd floor, Bangladesh Air Force gallery on the 3rd floor, UN Peacekeeping Gallery on the 4th floor, and Bangladesh Navy Gallery at the basement.

There is also a separate museum named "Toshakhana Jadughor" within the museum complex, where gifts and awards received by the country's important personnel are showcased.

There is also a grand sculpture in the middle of the "Toshakhana Jadughor" and all the artefacts see showcased around it in a corkscrew pattern.

The museum also has a wide implementation of Augmented Reality, Interactive Displays, Virtual Reality, Holograms etc. It also has a private movie theater called Star Cineplex.

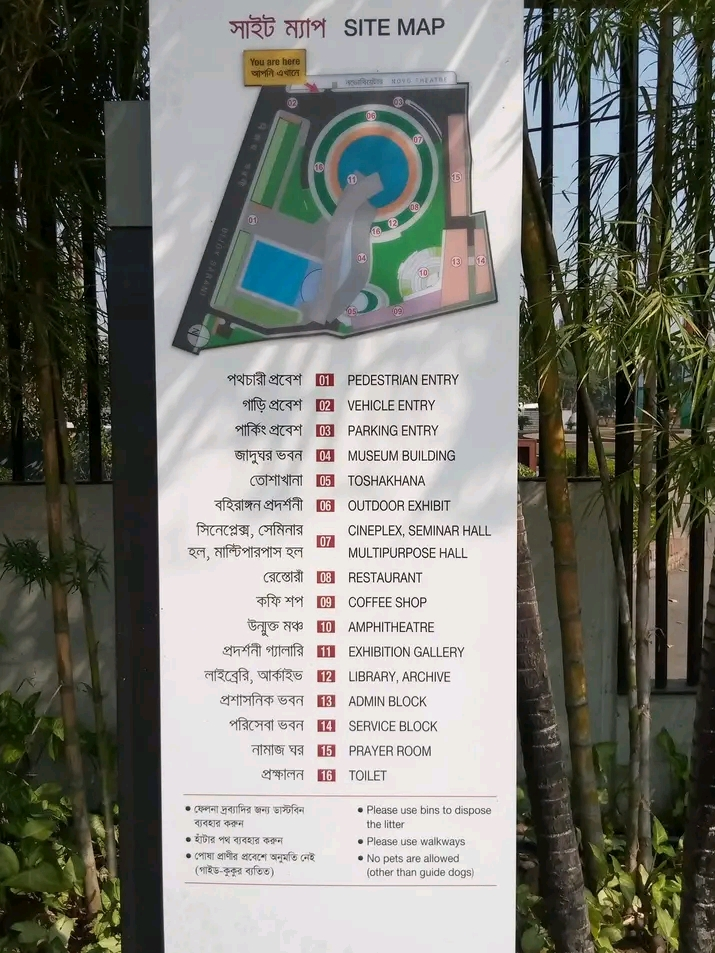
The site map/layout at the Bangladesh Military Museum

== Gallery ==
Bangladesh Military Museum
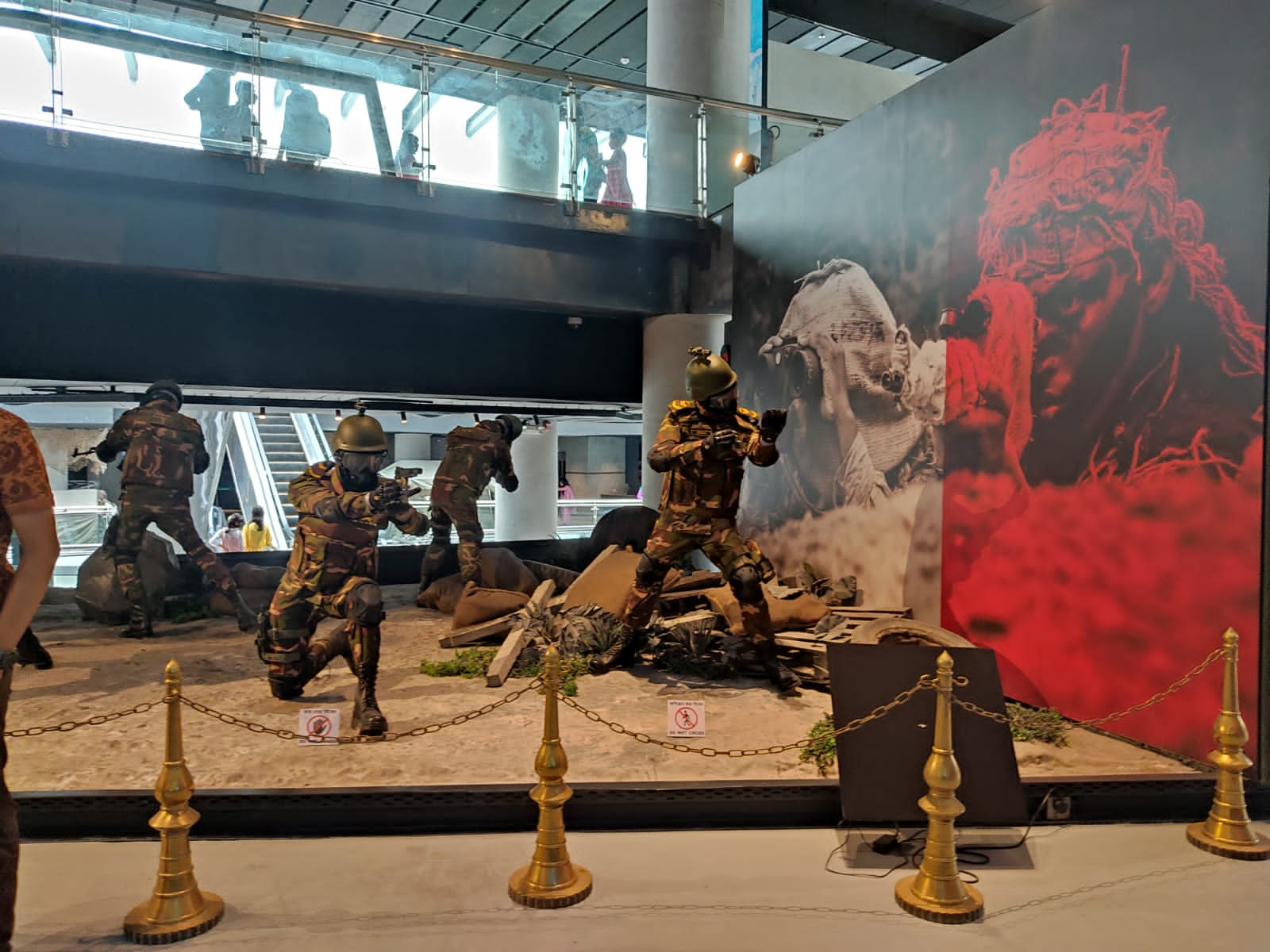
Models at the Army Gallery in Bangladesh Military Museum

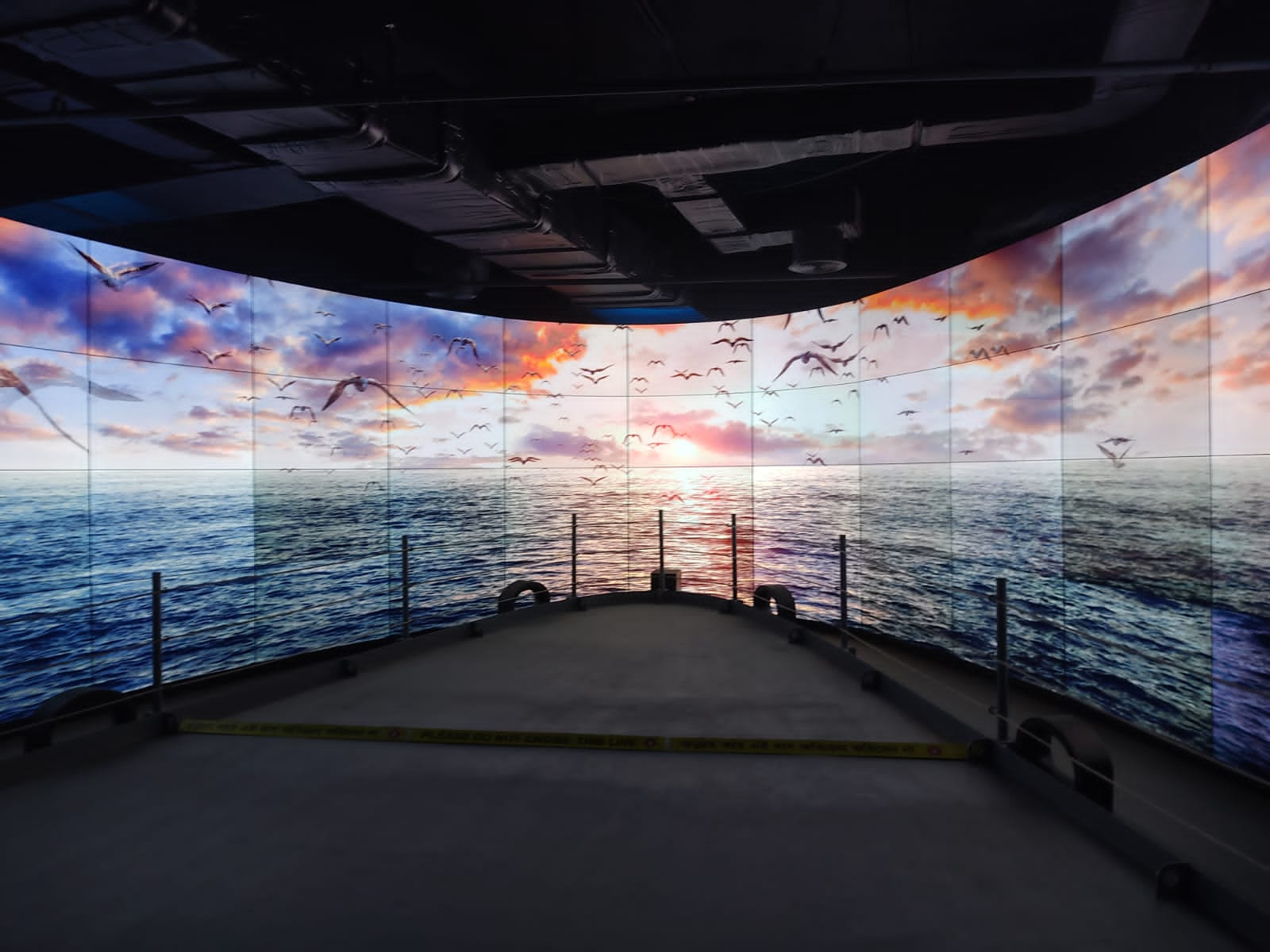
One of the Augmented reality exhibits of the Navy Gallery at the Bangladesh Military Museum

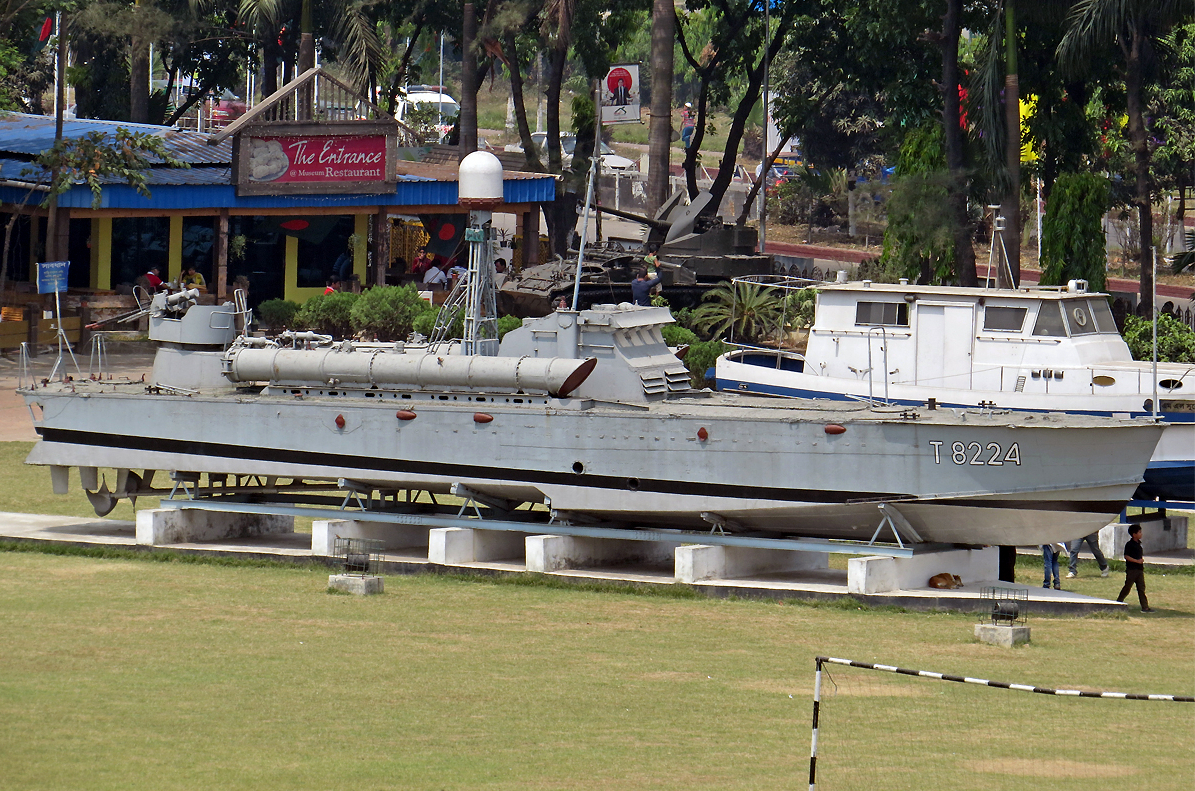
Decommissioned P 4-class torpedo boat of Bangladesh Navy preserved at Bangladesh Military Museum

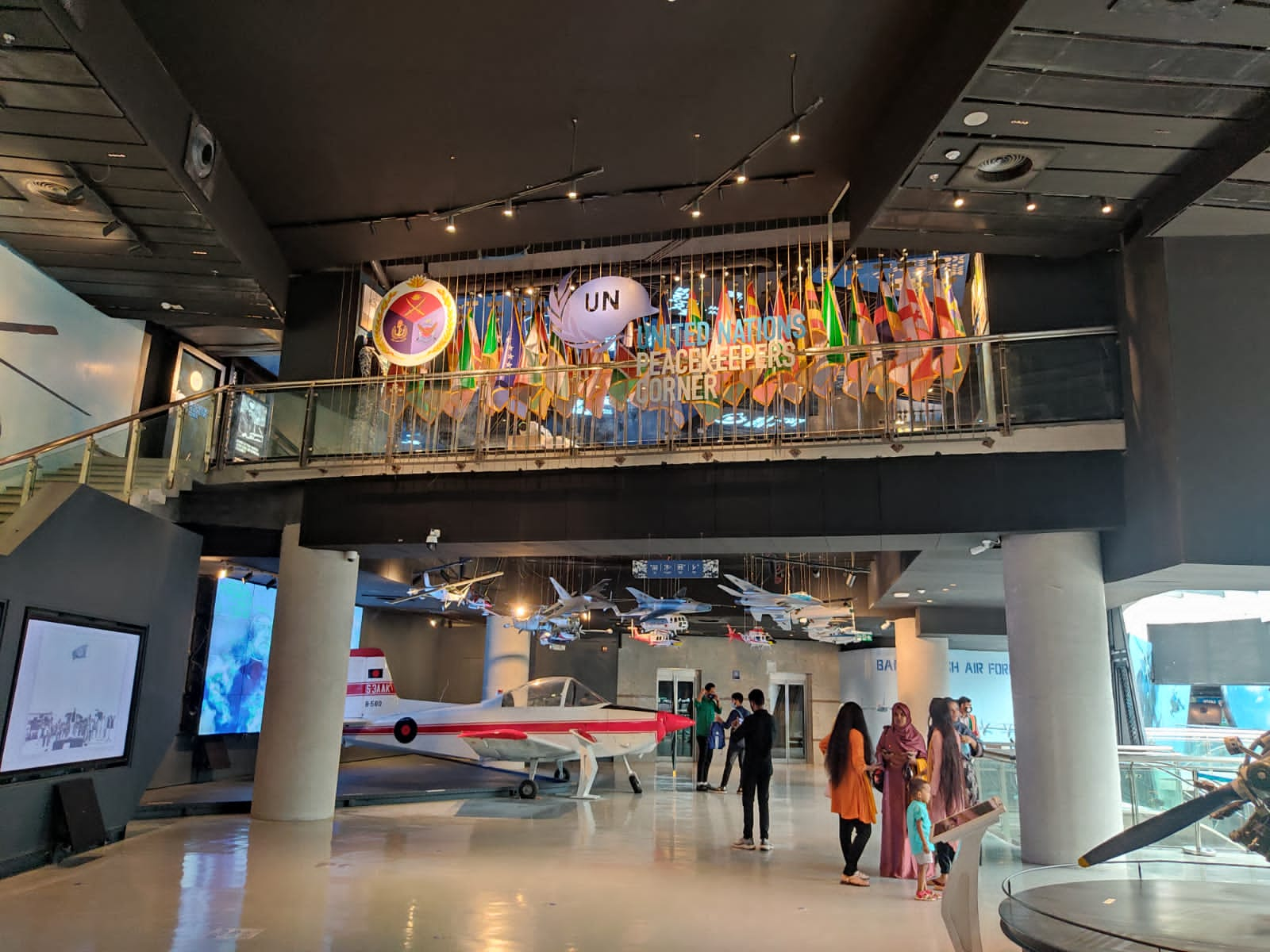
UN Peacekeeping Gallery at Bangladesh Military Museum

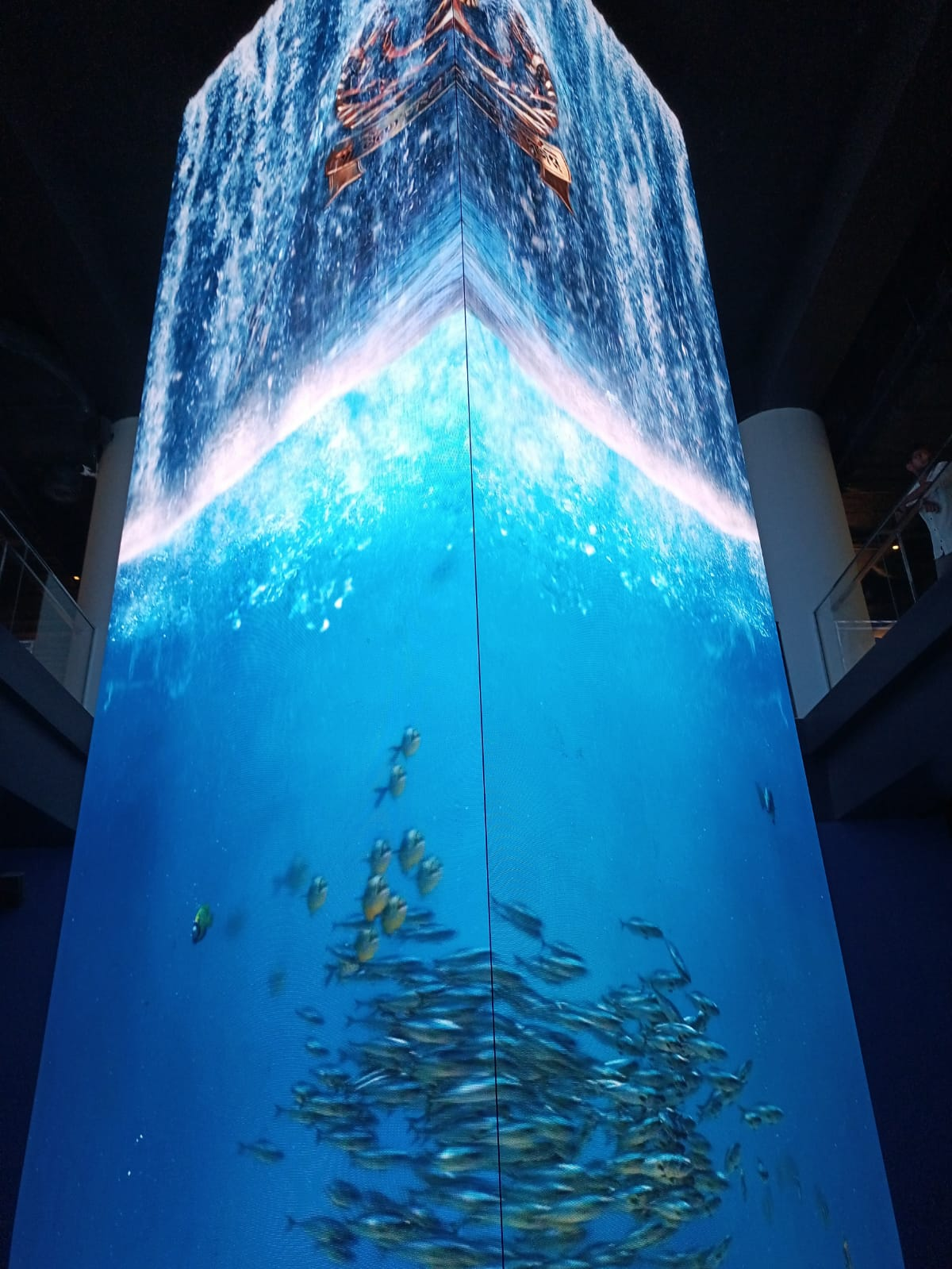
Digital 360 degree fish tank at Bangladesh Military Museum

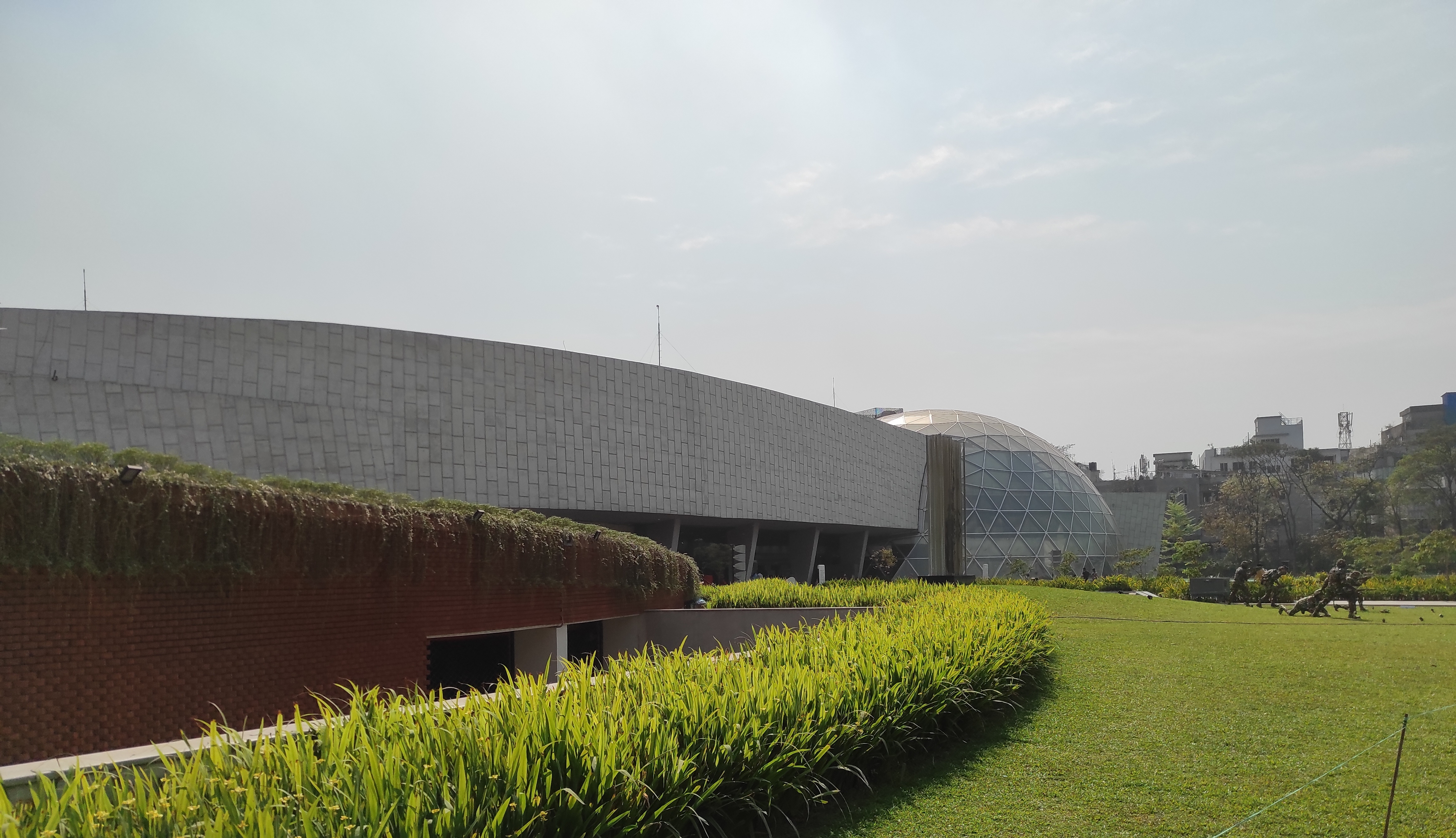
Green field and building

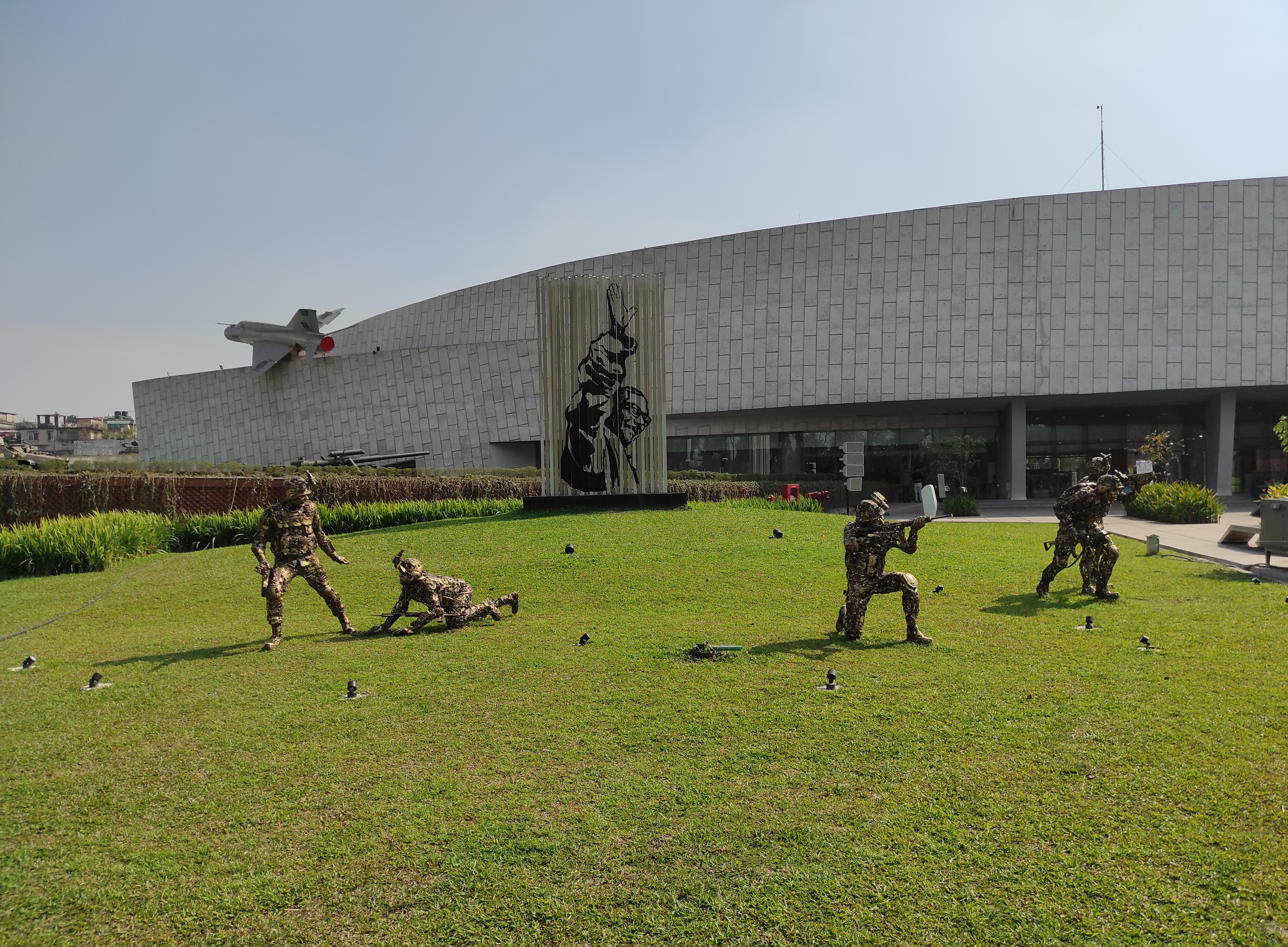
Green field and statues

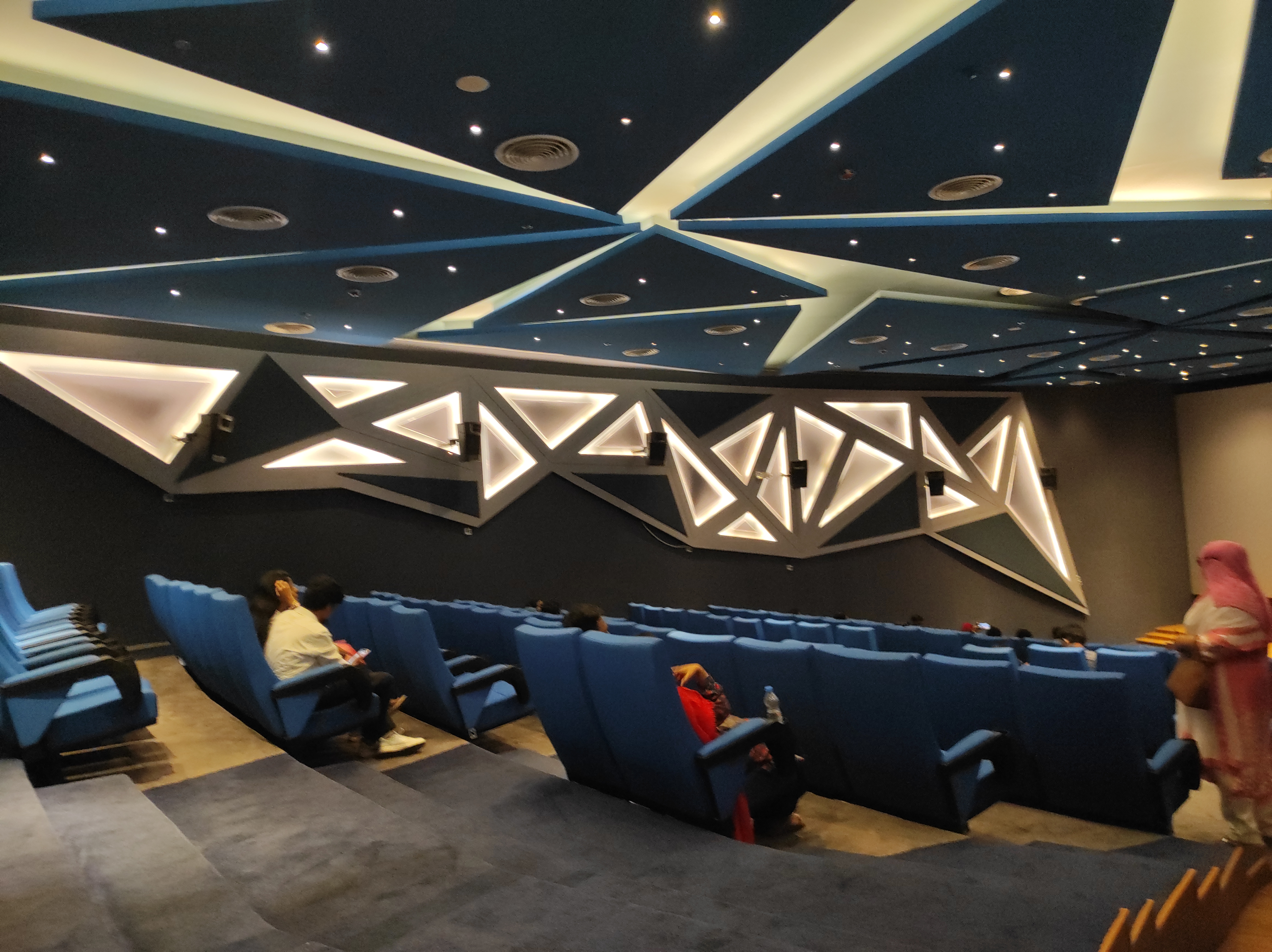
Star Cineplex inside the Museum

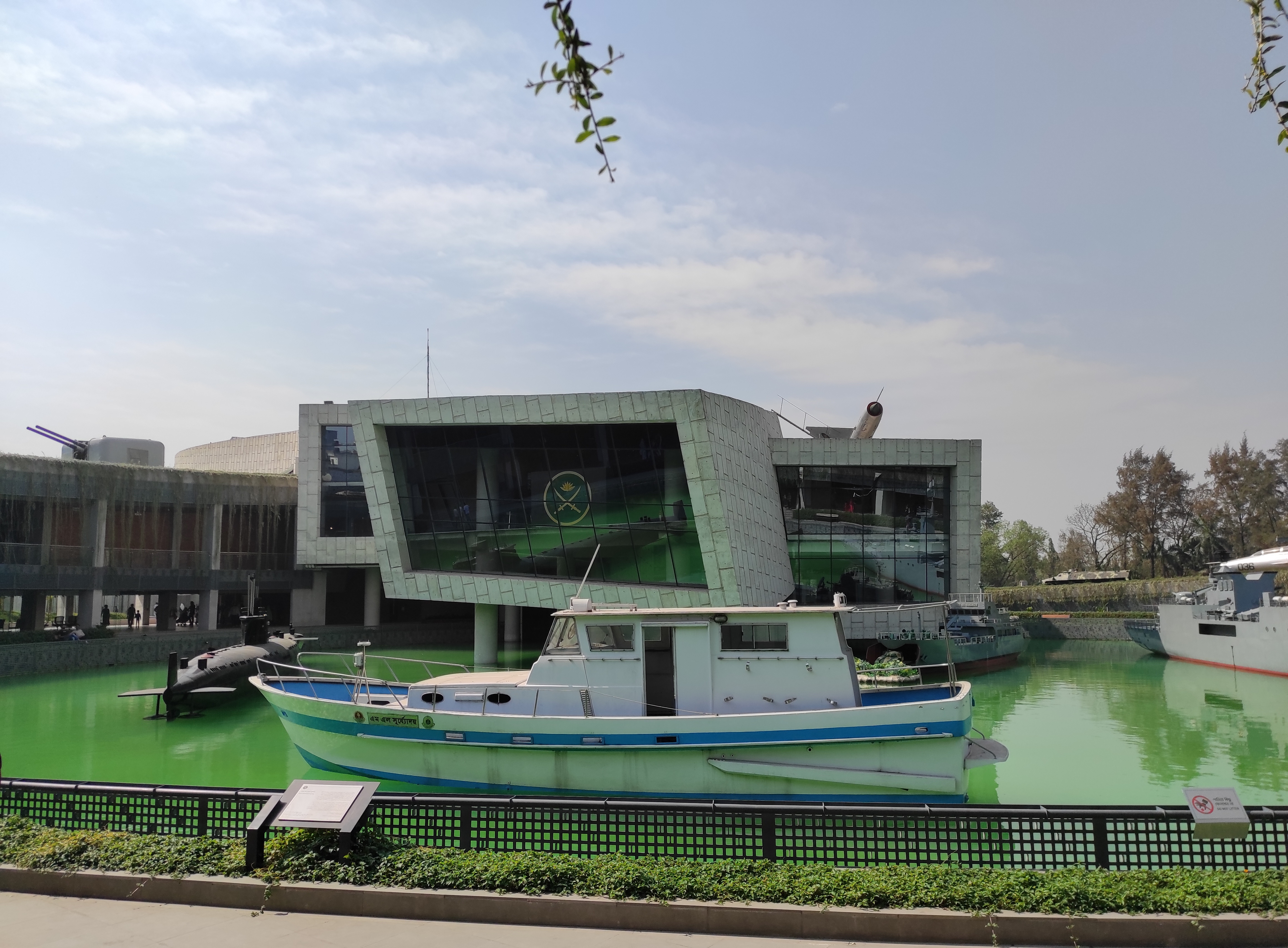
One side of the museum
