= Lynching of Dipu Chandra Das =

2025 crime in Bangladesh

- Part of the 2025 Bangladesh anti-Hindu violence and December 2025 political violence
- Location: Square Masterbari area, Bhaluka, Mymensingh, Bangladesh
- Date: 18 December 2025; Around 9:00 pm (BST (UTC+06:00))
- Attack type: Mob violence, lynching
- Deaths: 1
- Victim: Dipu Chandra Das (aged 27)
- Perpetrator: Mob of 140–150 people (per police report)
- Motive: Allegations of blasphemy

On 18 December 2025, Dipu Chandra Das, a Hindu garment worker in Bhaluka, Bangladesh, was beaten, hanged from a tree, and set on fire, in by a mob, after being accused of making derogatory remarks about Islam at a factory event. Investigators later reported that no evidence was found to support the allegation and ten perpetrators were arrested.

== Background ==
The lynching took place against a backdrop of escalating violence in Bangladesh following an attack on Sharif Osman Hadi, a prominent youth leader who died on 18 December 2025 from gunshot wounds sustained during an assassination attempt. Hadi had been a key figure in the July Uprising that led to the ousting of Prime Minister Sheikh Hasina in August 2024. His death sparked violent protests across the country, with attacks on media offices, cultural institutions, and Indian diplomatic missions.

Following the removal of Sheikh Hasina's government, Bangladesh witnessed increased violence against the Hindu minority community. According to the 2022 Bangladesh national census, there were approximately 13.1 million Hindus in Bangladesh, constituting about 7.95% of the country's population.

Dipu Chandra Das was a garment factory worker employed at Pioneer Knit Composite Factory in the Square Masterbari area of Bhaluka Upazila. He was a 27-year-old resident of Mukamiakanda village in Tarakanda Upazila of Mymensingh District. He was married and the father of a three-year-old daughter. Das had been living as a tenant in the Dubalia Para area of Bhaluka.

== Lynching ==
On the evening of 18 December 2025, Das was falsely accused of insulting the Islamic prophet Muhammad during a casual conversation among co-workers near closing time at the Pioneer Knitwear factory. The allegation spread rapidly through the factory and the surrounding neighbourhood. CCTV footage showed Das clocking out roughly 30 minutes after the conversation, before returning to the factory floor approximately two hours later. By around 6pm, unrest had spread both inside the factory and to the street outside. A crowd that began at several hundred at the factory gates, demanding Das be handed over, swelled to more than a thousand, drawing in bystanders from nearby areas. The factory management had alerted police at least 45 minutes before Das was taken, but even as industrial police and plain-clothes officers arrived at the scene, they were unable to extract him from the mob. Factory management and police gave differing accounts of how Das came to be surrendered: the senior factory manager stated that the crowd used shovels to prise open a smaller side gate at around 20:42 local time and "carried Dipu away like a wave", while police said factory workers opened the gate themselves after the mob threatened to break it down.

Das was beaten outside the factory before his body was dragged more than a kilometre through crowded streets to a busy highway, tied by the neck to a tree, and set on fire before hundreds of onlookers. Police estimated that around 150 people were directly involved in the attack, with many more present as onlookers. Videos widely shared on social media showed mobs chanting "Nara-e-Takbeer, Allahu Akbar" while kicking and beating Das's unconscious body outside the factory. Another video showed his naked and hanging body surrounded by a cheering, dancing mob.

== Investigation ==
Police were dispatched to the scene after receiving information about the incident and brought the situation under control. They recovered Das's body and sent it to Mymensingh Medical College Hospital for a post-mortem examination. Initially, no case was registered, with police stating that legal proceedings would begin once a formal complaint was filed. Das's brother, Apu Chandra Das, subsequently filed a case with Bhaluka Police Station accusing 140–150 unnamed persons. Das's body was returned to his family home in Mukamiakanda village, Tarakanda, on 20 December 2025.

The Rapid Action Battalion (RAB) stated that there was no direct evidence of "religious defamation" in the murder case. RAB also found no one who personally heard or witnessed anything related to religious defamation. Mymensingh RAB Company Commander Md. Samsuzzaman confirmed this information to BBC Bangla. The RAB-14 Director said the floor manager handed Das over to an enraged crowd after forcing him to resign from his job. Investigators are trying to find answers to why he was handed over to the crowd and police were not called. Previous enmity could be a motive here or the pressure from the crowd.

By 22 December, authorities in Bangladesh had arrested a total of 12 people, including two of Das's co-workers. In connection with the case, a Mymensingh court granted a three-day remand for the arrested individuals. Md. Sohel Rana was arrested by the detective police on 14 March 2026 for allegedly inciting workers with provocative slogans and playing an active role in the abuse of a dead body.

== Reactions ==
=== Domestic ===
The interim government of Bangladesh condemned the killing and promised accountability, with education adviser C. R. Abrar meeting Das's family to express sympathy and give assurance of government support. The Bangladesh Hindu Buddhist Christian Unity Council demanded the immediate arrest of the perpetrators, stating that the murder undermined communal harmony. The Communist Party of Bangladesh (Marxist–Leninist) condemned the "barbaric crime" as a sign of social and psychological breakdown, noting the disturbing silence of hundreds of onlookers. Condemnations were also issued by Bangladesh Jamaat-e-Islami secretary general Mia Golam Parwar and Hefazat-e-Islam Bangladesh leaders. The lynching was celebrated by many people in Bangladesh, including a prospective parliamentary candidate.

=== International ===
The ministry of external affairs of India (MEA) expressed deep concern over the "barbaric killing" and ongoing attacks on minorities, urging the Bangladesh government to ensure justice. Indian politicians strongly condemned the violence. Pawan Kalyan, the deputy chief minister of the Indian state of Andhra Pradesh, stated, the "pattern of targeting Hindus is cruel and clear". Priyanka Gandhi, an MP from the Indian National Congress, urged the Indian government to raise the safety of minorities with Bangladesh, while another Congress MP Shashi Tharoor termed the incident "unbearably tragic". Muslim leaders, including those from Jamiat Ulama-i-Hind, also condemned the lynching as shameful and anti-Islamic. Amnesty International called for immediate action against those responsible for the violence, which followed allegations of blasphemy. Several celebrities protested the killing. Singer Tony Kakkar released a track titled "Why violence in the name of religion?". Condemnations were voiced on social media by Janhvi Kapoor, Idhika Paul, Riddhi Sen, Mekhla Dasgupta, and Vikram Chatterjee.

On 28 December, the US state department condemned the lynching, terming the killing as "horrific" and further urged Bangladesh for the protection of minorities in the country. US Congressman Ro Khanna stated that "the killing of Dipu Chandra Das, a 27-year-old Hindu garment worker in Bangladesh, is horrific, and my thoughts and prayers are with his friends and family. We must unequivocally condemn and speak out against these vile acts of hatred and bigotry."

=== Protests ===
Protests demanding justice for Das erupted across Bangladeshi universities. At the University of Dhaka, students and DUCSU leaders held rallies condemning the "arson terrorism" and demanding the resignation of the Law and Home Advisers for failing to maintain order. The Bangladesh Jatiotabadi Chatra Dal and students of Jagannath Hall also organized demonstrations. Similar protests and vigils were held at Government Brojomohun College and Islamic University, Bangladesh by Hindu students.

Protests occurred in multiple Indian cities. In New Delhi, groups including the Bajrang Dal, demonstrated outside the Bangladesh High Commission. Tensions escalated with reports of threats to the High Commissioner, which the MEA denied as disinformation, though the Bangladeshi foreign ministry disputed this account. Marches were also held near the mission in Agartala. There were similar protests held outside the Bangladeshi mission in the city of Kolkata, and across the state of West Bengal.

=== Others ===
On 27 December, the Bengali Hindu Adarsha Sangha (BHAS) UK led a "Justice for Hindus" rally outside the Bangladesh High Commission in London to condemn the persecution of Bangladeshi minorities, specifically the killing of Das. Participants chanted the Hanuman Chalisa and "Hindu Lives Matter" to urge the Yunus administration and the British government to ensure minority safety. The demonstration was disrupted by Khalistani counter-protesters supporting the Bangladeshi interim government and the killing. A protest march in Janakpurdham, Nepal occurred on 25 December demanding justice for Das.

== See also ==
- Bangladesh post-resignation violence (2024–2026)
- December 2025 Bangladesh violence
- Hinduism in Bangladesh
- Human rights in Bangladesh
- Persecution of Hindus in Bangladesh
