= Demolition of Dhanmondi 32 =

Destruction of Bangabandhu Memorial Museum

- Part of Bangladesh post-resignation violence (2024–2026)
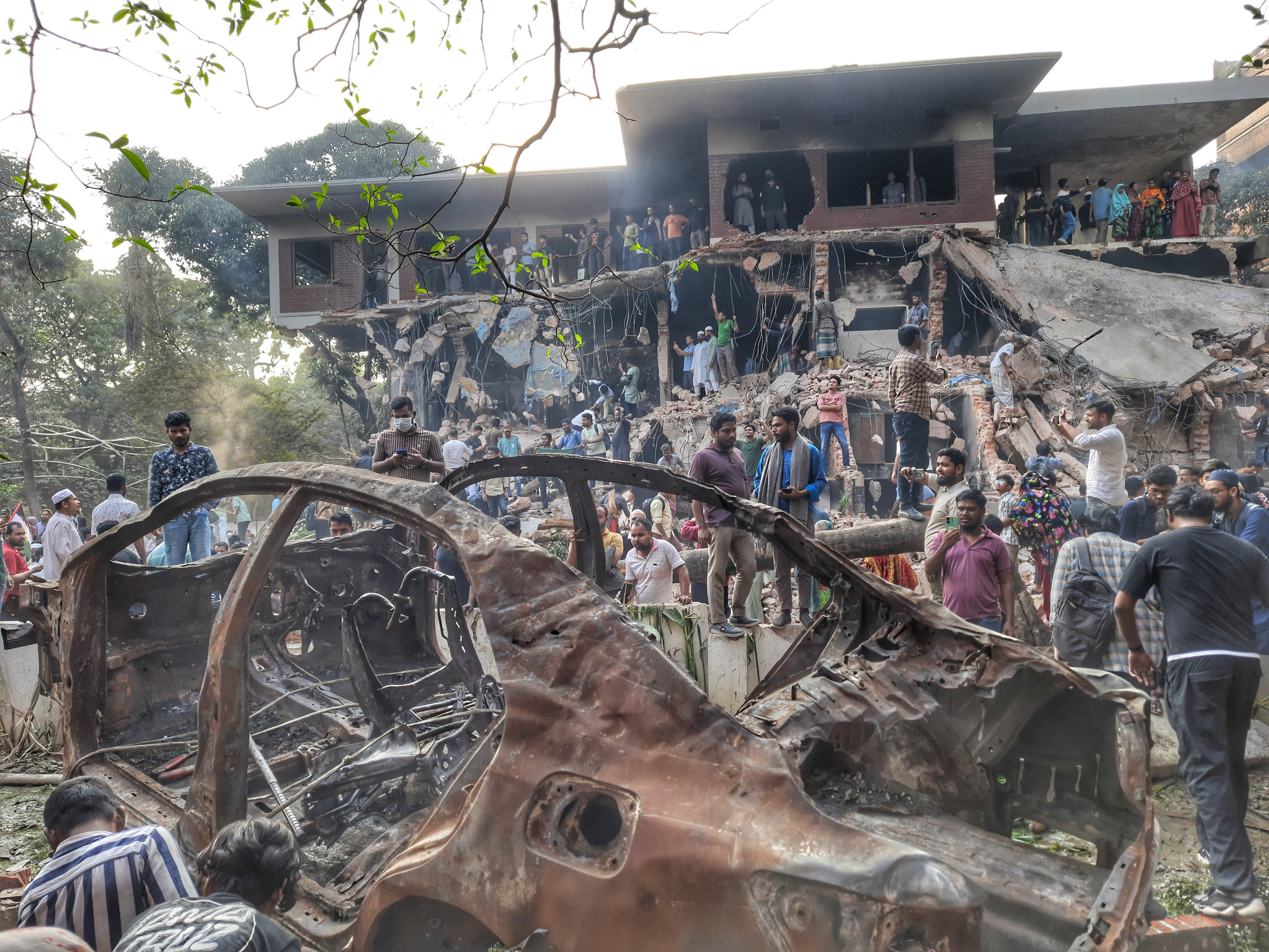
- Mob participating in the demolition on 6 February 2025

- Dhanmondi 32 (Bangladesh)
- Location: 23°45′06″N 90°22′35″E; Dhanmondi, Dhaka, Bangladesh
- Date: 5-6 February 2025; 20 months ago (UTC+6)
- Target: Bangabandhu Memorial Museum
- Attack type: Vandalism, Arson
- Weapons: Bulldozer, Excavator, Jackhammer
- Victims: 100+ (including ensuing riots)
- Perpetrators: Inqilab Moncho; Students Against Discrimination; Jatiya Nagorik Committee
- Motive: To "oppose the live streaming of Sheikh Hasina's speech" on Facebook

On 5 February 2025, the former residence of Bangladesh's founding president Sheikh Mujibur Rahman in Dhanmondi 32, was occupied and demolished by a large group of activists and supporters of the Inqilab Moncho and allied organisations in Dhaka, Bangladesh. The building, which housed Bangabandhu Memorial Museum and was considered a historic site, was torn down organising a rally during a period of intense political turmoil, which took place in the following months after the resignation of the Prime Minister Sheikh Hasina.

The demolition followed an online press conference attended by Sheikh Hasina self-imposed exile in India, during which she addressed topics that the rally described as "against national interests". This event occurred amid years of growing discontent regarding the political influence of the Sheikh family in the country's political landscape, and the rise of a cult of personality of Sheikh Mujibur Rahman. The demolition resulted in several months of political clashes, causing over a hundred casualties.

The events spread to various properties belonging to members of the Awami League, which was later officially banned in May 2025 for its role in crimes against humanity. The protests were a direct reaction to an online address by Sheikh Hasina, the fugitive former Prime Minister who was sentenced to death in absentia in November 2025 for her role in the 2024 massacres.

== Background ==
Dhanmondi 32 was the personal residence of Sheikh Mujibur Rahman, the founding President of Bangladesh. It was also the site where he was assassinated along with most of his family members on the coup of 15 August 1975. In 1994, the residence was converted into Bangabandhu Memorial Museum, preserving artifacts and memories. In August 2024, following political upheaval and the resignation of Prime Minister Sheikh Hasina, the museum was subjected to vandalism and arson attacks during widespread violence. The interior suffered significant damage, and many artifacts were lost.

On 5 February 2025, Hasina delivered a social media address from India, challenging the legitimacy of the interim government. This address was widely condemned by student leaders and the interim government as an attempt to incite "counter-revolutionary" violence. Exiled activist Pinaki Bhattacharya encouraged his followers to demolish the building. Hasnat Abdullah, convener of the Students Against Discrimination, warned against Hasina's speech.

== Demolition ==
On the evening of 5 February 2025, a large rally organised by Inqilab Moncho gathered at Dhanmondi 32, responding to calls on social media for a "Bulldozer Procession" aimed at demolishing the site, which they referred to as a "shrine of fascism". The rally escalated quickly, with participants breaking through the entrance and vandalizing the interior, including the destruction of a mural of Sheikh Mujibur Rahman. As the situation intensified, a fire broke out on the second floor of the building. Mobs, undeterred by the flames, continued their actions, using tools to demolish parts of the house. Heavy machinery, including an excavator and a crane, was brought in to aid in the demolition.

Despite the presence of security forces, there was little to no intervention during the demolition as the crowd overwhelmed security forces. The event continued into the early hours of the next day, with significant portions of the building being reduced to rubble. The demolition coincided with a speech delivered by Sheikh Hasina from exile in India. In her address, she urged her supporters to oppose the interim government led by Muhammad Yunus, labeling it as "unconstitutional". She said in the speech,

"They may destroy a building, but they won't be able to erase the history".

Hasina's speech was perceived by many protesters as a provocation, leading to the escalation that resulted in the demolition of the residence. Inqilab Moncho spokesperson Osman Hadi was heard chanting,

"32 set on fire, 32 vandalised. Sheikh Hasina no more".

== Aftermath ==
=== Nationwide expansion ===
The "Bulldozer March" expanded beyond the capital to several districts:

- Noakhali: The residence of Obaidul Quader, the then-General Secretary of the Awami League, was vandalized and set on fire.
- Jamalpur: The home of a local leader associated with the Jamalpur District Awami League was targeted.
- Khulna and Sylhet: Structures linked to the Sheikh family and party offices were demolished or defaced by mobs using hammers and construction tools.

=== Initial assaults and violence ===
On 6 February 2025, as the demolition of Dhanmondi 32 continued, individuals were seen collecting materials such as steel, iron, tin, and wood. The removal of materials took place in an unregulated manner, with no intervention from law enforcement. On the same day, two individuals—a man and a woman—were physically assaulted near the demolition site. Witnesses reported that the man was attacked after chanting "Joy Bangla" and expressing support for the Awami League. He was knocked to the ground by a mob before being assisted onto a rickshaw by bystanders. Shortly afterward, a middle-aged woman near the site expressed distress, reportedly saying,

"আপার ঘর ভেঙ্গে ফেলছে".
"Sister's house is being demolished". (Note: Referring to Sheikh Hasina)

This prompted a confrontation with mob, which then assaulted her before bystanders took her to safety. Following the protests, the Detective Branch (DB) of the police detained several individuals for questioning regarding suspected "seditious conspiracy" and links to the former regime's efforts to destabilize the transition. Among those picked up was actor and filmmaker Meher Afroz Shaon, whose father was a senior member of the Jamalpur Awami League; she was released after interrogation.

On 12 February 2025, the house of Nuruzzaman Kafi, a coordinator of the Students Against Discrimination, was burned down which he claimed was a retaliation by individuals aligned with the former ruling party for his involvement in the demolition.

=== Disruption of observances ===
In May 2025, the interim government officially banned the Awami League under the Anti-Terrorism Act, citing evidence of "systematic crimes against humanity" committed during its tenure. On 15 August 2025, the interim government announced that it would prevent the celebration of the 50th death anniversary of Sheikh Mujibur Rahman to 'avoid further violence'. The area of Dhanmondi-32 and Sheikh Mujibur Rahman's Tomb was surrounded by police. Around 11 am, a rickshaw puller from Jatrabari was attacked when he arrived at 32 Dhanmondi with a bouquet of flowers in his hand driving a rickshaw. The bouquet of flowers was taken from his hand. In addition to being beaten, his rickshaw was also vandalized. Later, the police arrested Azizur and was granted bail.

Notable personalities including Shakib Al Hasan, Shakib Khan, Sohel Rana, Jaya Ahsan were seen posting on social media paying tribute to Sheikh Mujibur Rahman.

=== Hasina's trial and unrest ===
On 13 November 2025, during a lockdown program called by Sheikh Hasina's party Awami League to oppose her trial, the police arrested a woman at Dhanmondi 32. She had been attacked by a mob after arriving there. She was later charged with the July massacre case and sent to prison. On the same day, a school boy was also arrested by the police along with some books while collecting brick from the ruins. After 6 hours, he was released to the custody of his family on bond.

On 17 November 2025, the day the verdict of Trial of Sheikh Hasina was delivered, a mob made an attempt at vandalism at the ruins. The mob brought 2 excavators to the location. However, they were not allowed to move them near the building. Army and police personnel blocked the mob, leading to repeated clashes in the area. The mob left the area after 10:00 pm. The excavators brought to the site was removed. Army, police, and Border Guard Bangladesh (BGB) were deployed in the area.

The International Crimes Tribunal (Bangladesh) found Sheikh Hasina guilty of ordering mass killings during the 2024 uprising and sentenced her to death by hanging.

=== Later violence ===
On 18 December 2025, Osman Hadi, co-founder and the leader of the Inqilab Moncho, died of gunshot wounds sustained by individuals on 12 December 2025. Labeling the individuals as 'Awami League affiliated', a mob including the Hadi supporters attacked the site for the third time damaging the remaining debris during political violence erupted following his death. Meta Platforms removed the Facebook page of exiled right-wing online activist Elias Hossain following several allegations of inciting violence via social media during the incident. In December 2025, students at the University of Dhaka burned effigies of exiled right-wing activist Pinaki Bhattacharya and Elias Hossain, chanting slogans in protest against them.

== Reactions ==
=== National ===
==== Domestic ====
- Government of Bangladesh: The press wing of the Chief Adviser Muhammad Yunus of the interim government issued a statement regarding the demolition stating:

The vandalism at Dhanmondi 32 on Wednesday was unexpected and unintended. The incident was a manifestation of anger triggered by Sheikh Hasina's provocative remarks against the July Uprising. Over the last six months there had been no attack there... The reaction to her violent behaviour caused the incident of vandalism... The government remains highly vigilant in protecting the lives and properties of the people. Law enforcement agencies are making every possible effort to bring the situation under control... The government will examine what legal actions can be taken against those involved in inciting unrest.

- 26 eminent citizens expressed concern over the incident of vandalism and violence stating:

The law enforcement agencies were aware of the demolition of Dhanmondi 32 and the government cannot evade responsibility with a post-incident statement... As citizens of a civilised country, we are deeply saddened, shocked, and ashamed. We demand a thorough investigation and justice; but to whom should we voice our demands? The institutions responsible for maintaining law and order have either acted as silent spectators or have been completely inactive... The demolition of Dhanmondi 32 has nothing to do with the current movement against fascism. It would be perceived by people as an incitement to violence.. It is a matter of deep concern that a section of the youth, whom we believe to be the main force in rebuilding our future, may be manipulated by domestic or foreign evil forces. It is essential to investigate this aspect in light of the recent events.

- The Transparency International Bangladesh described the acts of violence as "unusual" and criticised the government for not preventing such incidents. Its executive director, Iftekharuzzaman, stated:

There is no way to deny that Sheikh Hasina, accused of committing mass killing, and her aides did the most irreplaceable damage to Bangabandhu, the Liberation War, and the spirit of the Liberation War during authoritarian rule driven by endless lust for partisanship and dynasticism... Although there was pre-announcement of a violent programme, law enforcement agencies, along with the army as a supportive force, or the government have shown alarming nonchalance in controlling the situation or taking preventive measures. Trying to avoid responsibility later by issuing a statement describing the incident as 'unexpected and unintended' is also noticeable.

- The Bangladesh Legal Aid and Services Trust condemned and expressed concern over the incidents of vandalism and arson. The statement, which strongly demanded the interim government to take effective measures by the law enforcement agencies to prevent violence and chaos, stated:

The failure to maintain law and order has created a chaotic and conflictual situation across the country, and the police administration has failed to take preventive measures in a timely manner. Such organized attacks are very worrying. Such destruction of facilities and property is a criminal offense under existing law. It is urgent to take steps to prevent such violence, restore peace, order and stability, and establish the rule of law.

- The Ain o Salish Kendra in a statement said,
  The incidents, which began on Wednesday evening and continued till yesterday, are considered direct violations of the rule of law, equal access to justice, and proper legal procedures. A call to attack and destroy the Dhanmondi-32 residence of Sheikh Mujibur Rahman was widely circulated on social media throughout the day, and later that evening, a group of people under the guise of "students" gathered from various parts of the country to engage in vandalism, looting, mayhem, and even arson. Despite the presence of a military team at the site, no significant action was taken, and the team eventually left the scene. As the unrest spread throughout the night, numerous other buildings, properties, and locations across the country were targeted. Under international human rights laws, everyone is entitled to equal protection, the right to property, and access to proper legal procedures. It's the government's responsibility to ensure these rights, and the inability to do so can be seen as a sign of its failure.
- Bangladesh Police: Police officials stated,
  We tried to bar them [agitators] but they were in a huge number, we could not stop them. Some even started attacking the policemen.

==== Political ====
The Bangladesh Awami League condemned the demolition, stating that the attack was "an affront to national identity and a bid to erase collective history". Conversely, some opposition leaders and activists viewed the demolition as a symbolic rejection of what they perceived as authoritarianism and political nepotism. Hafizuddin Ahmed of the Bangladesh Nationalist Party reacted to the demolition, calling it "an obstruction to the path of democracy" and also questioned the government's role in it. The Left Democratic Alliance held an emergency meeting, attended by leaders of the Socialist Party of Bangladesh, Socialist Party of Bangladesh (Marxist), Communist Party of Bangladesh, Ganatantrik Biplobi Party, and others. In a joint statement, they condemned the incidents of vandalism and the use of bulldozers to destroy significant historical sites such as Sheikh Mujibur Rahman's Dhanmondi 32 residence and noted the interim government's inaction, terming it a failure to maintain law and order. The rights body called on the government and all relevant parties to uphold the respect for the law, human rights, and democracy, and stressed that all activities must be conducted in accordance with due legal procedure.

- In a separate statement, the Jatiya Samajtantrik Dal condemned the string of violence stating,
  The government is providing direct support to extremist groups, who, under the protection of the military and law enforcement agencies, used bulldozers, excavators, and heavy machinery to destroy buildings. These included the Bangabandhu Memorial Museum, along with murals, statues, and other symbols of the Liberation War.
- On 16 August 2025, at the freedom fighter gathering of the Kaderia army organized on the occasion of Makrai Day in Tangail, demanding the justice Abdul Kader Siddique said,

Don't compare Bangabandhu and Sheikh Hasina as one. Those who destructed the house of Bangabandhu also have houses. They cannot carry their houses in their hands. So don't cross the boundary.

=== International ===
- The International Council of Museums (ICOM) expressed deep concern over the crisis in Bangladesh, which led to the destruction of invaluable cultural heritage sites and museums. It stated:

We would like to inform everyone that at this time of crisis in the country, we observe with deep concern our many priceless museums - Independence Museum, Bangabandhu Memorial Museum, Genocide Museum, Shashi Lodge and various heritage are being destroyed by arson and widespread vandalism. On behalf of ICOM-Bangladesh, we feel that threatening the existence of museums, historical documents, memorial plaques, archaeological sites etc. is harmful to the universal humanity. Our cultural heritage has made us unique in the world. UNESCO has recognized some of our heritage as World Heritage. We believe that more of our heritage will be part of global recognition in the future. Museums, historical buildings, archives, etc. are unique examples of our national identity, inspiration for our future, our source of self-identity. Damage, arson, vandalism etc. cannot be desirable in any way. Protecting them is everyone's moral, personal and, above all, national responsibility.

- The United Nations stated:

We call for calm and for everyone to refrain from violence. Retaliation and revenge will only deepen divisions and undermine the rights of all...

- Government of India: Ministry of External Affairs spokesperson Randhir Jaiswal stated:

It is regrettable that the historic residence of Sheikh Mujibur Rahman, a symbol of the heroic resistance of the people of Bangladesh against the forces of occupation and oppression, was destroyed on 5 February 2025. All those who value the freedom struggle that nurtured Bangla identity and pride are aware of the importance of this residence for the national consciousness of Bangladesh. This act of vandalism should be strongly condemned.

- The North American social platform "Ekattorer Prohori" (Guardians of 1971) condemned the demolition in a statement issued on behalf of the organization by 44 expatriates, including freedom fighters, artists, organizers, professors, lawyers, and activists. Describing February 5 as another "tragic black day" for the "democracy-loving people of Bangladesh" they stated:

The historic Dhanmondi 32 residence, deeply intertwined with Bangladesh's liberation history and Sheikh Mujibur Rahman's long political career, has been attacked for the second time. The remaining parts of the fire-ravaged house were destroyed that day. In a similar manner, all of Bangabandhu's monuments and plaques across Bangladesh have been destroyed, and even the homes of his political followers have been demolished. The demolition of Dhanmondi 32 in Bangladesh was broadcast live online, we along with countless Bangladeshis worldwide watched in sorrow from New York. It is a dire warning for the country's existence like the dark days of the 1971 Liberation War. We urge all political parties, artists, writers, journalists, intellectuals, and conscious citizens who believe in the ideals of the Liberation War to unite in defence of Bangladesh's independence and democratic values.

- Global Human Rights Defence stated in a report:

The vandalism of the Bangabandhu Memorial Museum, which is dedicated to Sheikh Mujibur Rahman (the museum was his former house where he and his family were killed) and Bangladesh’s fight for independence, was an outlandish action and assault on the very essence of Bangladesh’s national identity. The lingering impact of this cultural destruction continues to be experienced in Bangladesh’s ongoing efforts in documenting and preserving its historical heritage. The vandalism of archives, manuscripts, and cultural artefacts hindered the potential of education and recollection of the genocide. The demolition of cultural heritage should not be seen merely as an act of war but rather more as a strategic move toward discrediting the country’s efforts at redefining its identity in the aftermath of independence, thereby compelling Bangladesh to reconstruct its history from fragmented and insufficient pieces.

== Legal initiatives ==
On 25 February 2026, following the thirteenth national parliamentary election, Sheikh Hafizur Rahman Curzon, a professor in the Department of Law at the University of Dhaka, announced his intention to file a lawsuit against Muhammad Yunus, the head of the former interim government, and his advisors. The proposed charges involve four specific allegations, including the destruction of the historic Dhanmondi 32 residence. Regarding the legal grounds, Professor Curzon stated:

“There are several reasons why Yunus and gang should face trial. These include violations of the constitution and endangering national sovereignty... I will file another case concerning the vandalism of the residence at Dhanmondi 32, the house of the Father of the Nation, Bangabandhu Sheikh Mujibur Rahman. Rare documents and evidence were repeatedly destroyed there; we need to identify whose instigation, domestic or foreign, led to this and which members of the interim government allowed it to happen from within. Why the police and army did not intervene will also be a subject of the lawsuit...”

Prior to this, Mohsin Rashid, President of the Bangladesh Muslim League and a Senior Advocate of the Bangladesh Supreme Court, announced his intention to file a case against Muhammad Yunus on charges of sedition. However, in August 2026, a Dhaka Metropolitan Magistrate Court under the Tarique administration dismissed a case petition against 27 people over the demolition, including Muhammad Yunus and former law adviser Asif Nazrul, citing "insufficient grounds for cognizance".

== See also ==
- Sheikh Mujibur Rahman statue destruction
- 2025 Gopalganj clashes
- Operation Devil Hunt
- Trial of Sheikh Hasina
