= Sheikh Mujibur Rahman statue destruction =

2024 Bangladeshi political event

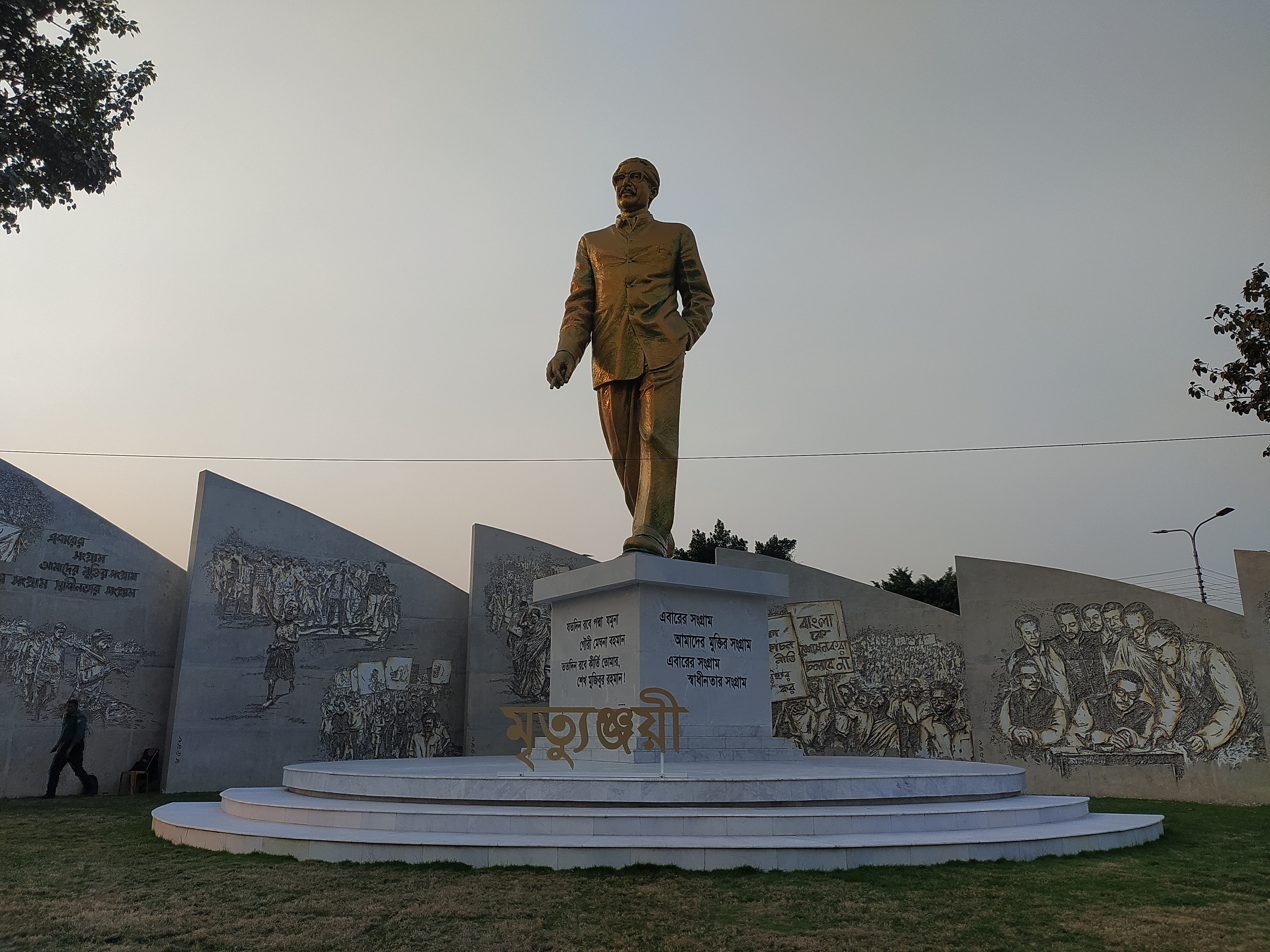
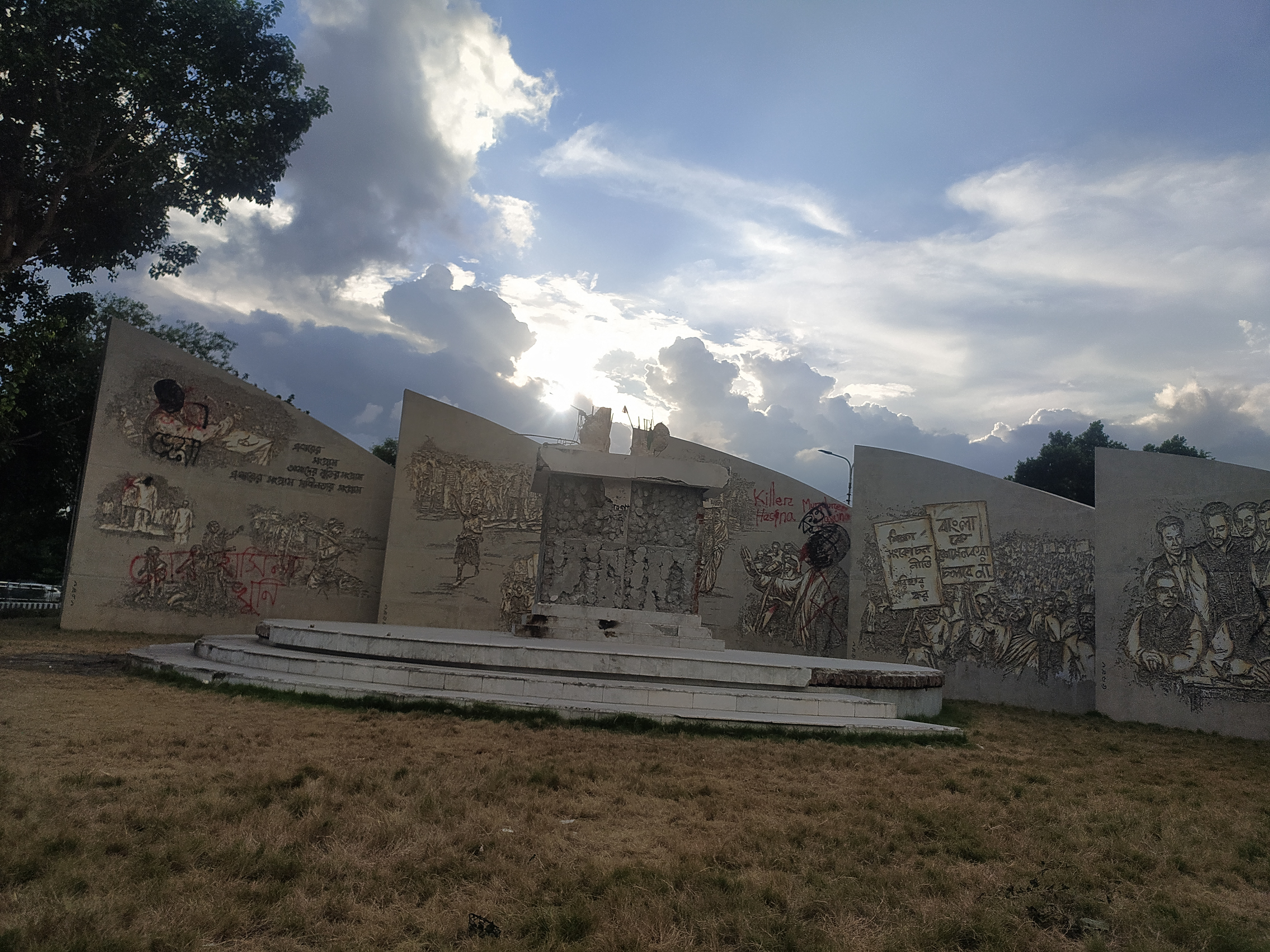
The statue of Mujib before (left) and after (right) the destruction

On 5 August 2024, after the resignation of Prime Minister Sheikh Hasina following the July Uprising, a large golden statue of Sheikh Mujibur Rahman, the first president of Bangladesh and Hasina's father, at the Mrityunjayee Prangan in Bijoy Sarani, Dhaka was destroyed by the protesters. The event received live global media coverage, wherein it came to symbolise the end of Hasina's 15-year rule and Sheikh Mujibur Rahman's cult of personality in Bangladesh.

== Background ==
The "Mrityunjayee Prangan" was inaugurated in 2023 by Hasina. Sculptures were displayed in Victory Day parades in 2021 and 2022. The sculpture was erected under the supervision of the Bangladesh Army.

The memorial was centered on a sculpture of former president Sheikh Mujibur Rahman. His contribution to the Bengali language movement, to the Bangladesh Liberation War and various incidents during these events were highlighted in the murals of the sculpture.

== Destruction ==
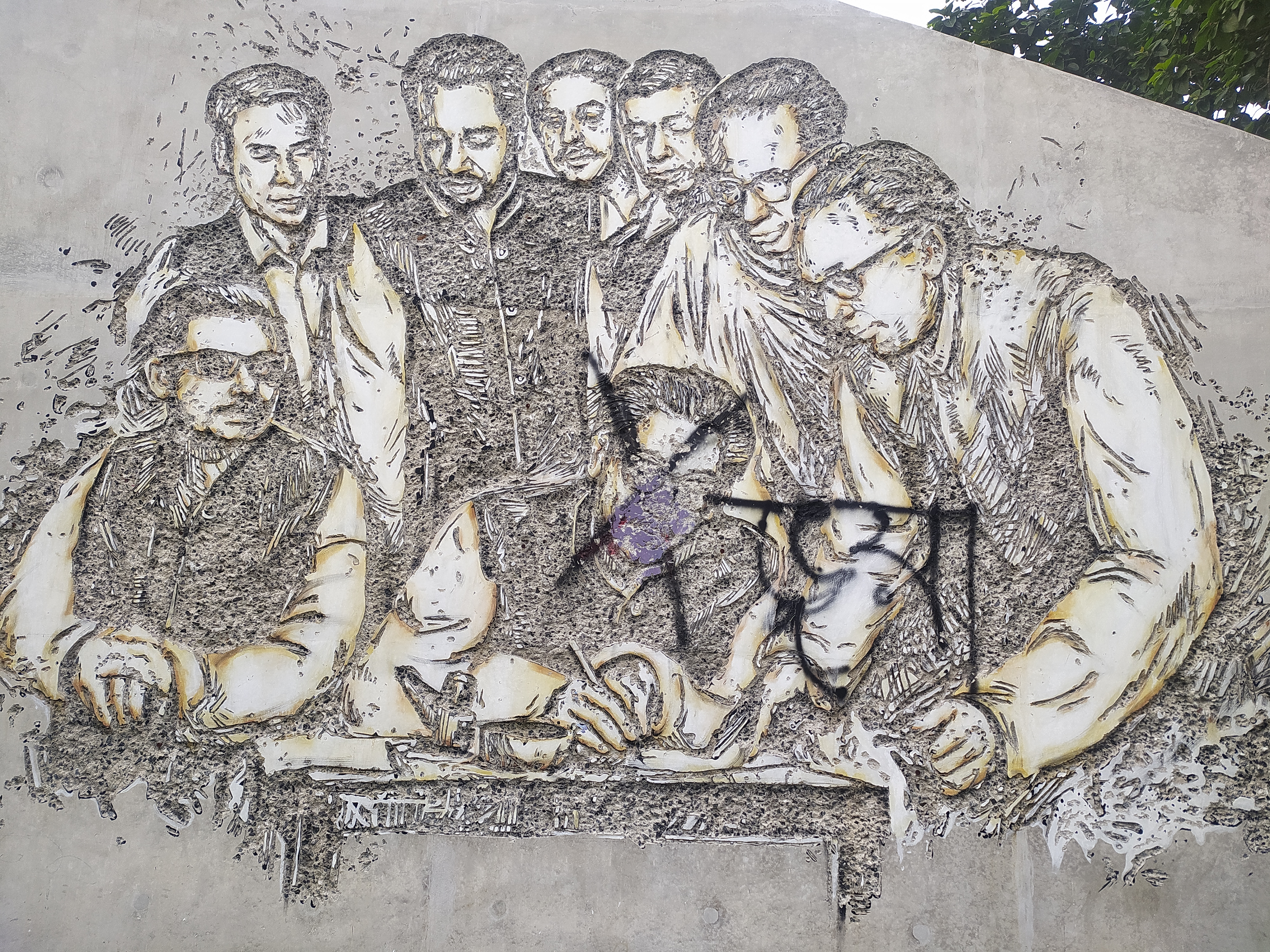
Face of Sheikh Mujib has been crossed out with Bhuā (lit. 'Fraud') written in Bengali.

On the day of Hasina's resignation, protesters climbed up and vandalized the golden statue of Mujib at the Mrityunjayee Prangan. Over 1,500 cultural and historical sculptures, including those of Mujib, were destroyed by 7 August. The statue was fully demolished by the afternoon. The destruction of the statue was compared with that of Saddam Hussain's statue in Baghdad in 2003.

== Reactions ==
The destruction of the statue was perceived by many people as the fall of the state-sponsored cult of personality around Mujibur Rahman and Awami League authoritarianism. According to civil rights activist Professor Anu Muhammad,

The long 'authoritarian' rule of Sheikh Hasina, daughter of Sheikh Mujib, had generated public resentment. Sheikh Mujib came under attack as an extension of that anger toward Sheikh Hasina. In that context, the acts of vandalism that occurred immediately after the mass uprising were 'spontaneous'. Later, however, various groups based on political ideologies, continued the vandalism, which was not spontaneous. Due to their opposition to Sheikh Hasina or her party, those groups went so far as to target Sheikh Mujib as well as the history.

Bangladesh Khilafat Andolon supported the events as iconography is prohibited in Islam. BBC Bangla showed it in parallel with the destruction of many other fallen regimes' statues. However, liberals and cultural organisations like Bangladesh Udichi Shilpigoshthi opposed it. Bangladesh Nationalist Party general secretary Mirza Fakhrul Islam Alamgir expressed his concerns, blaming Sheikh Hasina for the consequences.

== See also ==
- 2024 Bangladesh post-resignation violence
- De-commemoration
- Demolition of Dhanmondi 32
