= Novo Theatre, Dhaka =

Research institute in Bangladesh

Novotheatre, Dhaka
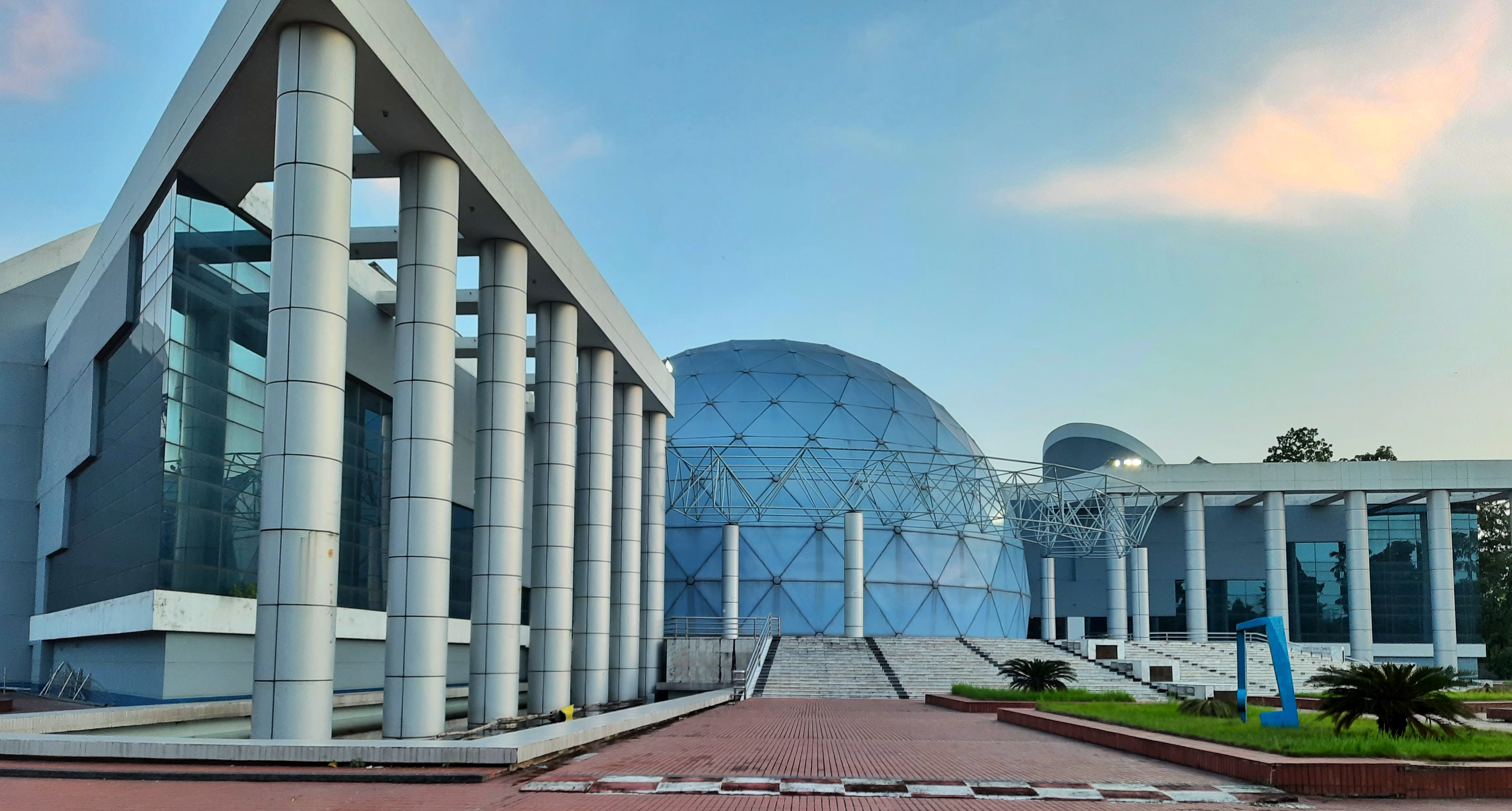
- Front side of the Novotheatre
- Former names: Bhasani Novotheatre; Bangabandhu Sheikh Mujibur Rahman Novotheatre
- Established: 25 September 2004
- Location: Bijoy Sarani Avenue, Tejgaon, Dhaka, Bangladesh
- Coordinates: 23.763606°N 90.387324°E
- Website: novotheatre.portal.gov.bd

Novotheatre, Dhaka (formerly Bhasani Novotheatre and Bangabandhu Sheikh Mujibur Rahman Novotheatre) is a planetarium on Bijoy Sarani Avenue of Tejgaon area in Dhaka, Bangladesh.

== History ==
The Novotheatre opened to public on 25 September 2004. It was previously named Bhashani Novotheatre. It was made autonomous by Bangabandhu Sheikh Mujibur Rahman Novotheatre Bill 2010. The space center was commissioned by the Ministry of Science and Communication Technology of the Government of Bangladesh.

On March 20, 2025, the interim government of Bangladesh, through an ordinance, changed the name of the Novotheater from Bangabandhu Sheikh Mujibur Rahman Novotheatre to Novotheatre .

== Description ==
Built on 5.46 acres of land, its spaces range in size from its 21-meter dome, seating 275 people;

== Design ==
The planetarium was designed by architect Ali Imam. The Planetarium dome simulates Earth and its cool blue sky. This dome-shaped theater was built with the latest equipment, enabling visitors to soar into space as well as experience the thrills of an interplanetary journey in a three-dimensional environment. The curved ceiling represents the sky and shows moving images of planets and stars through projection onto a large-screen dome at an angle of 120 degrees.

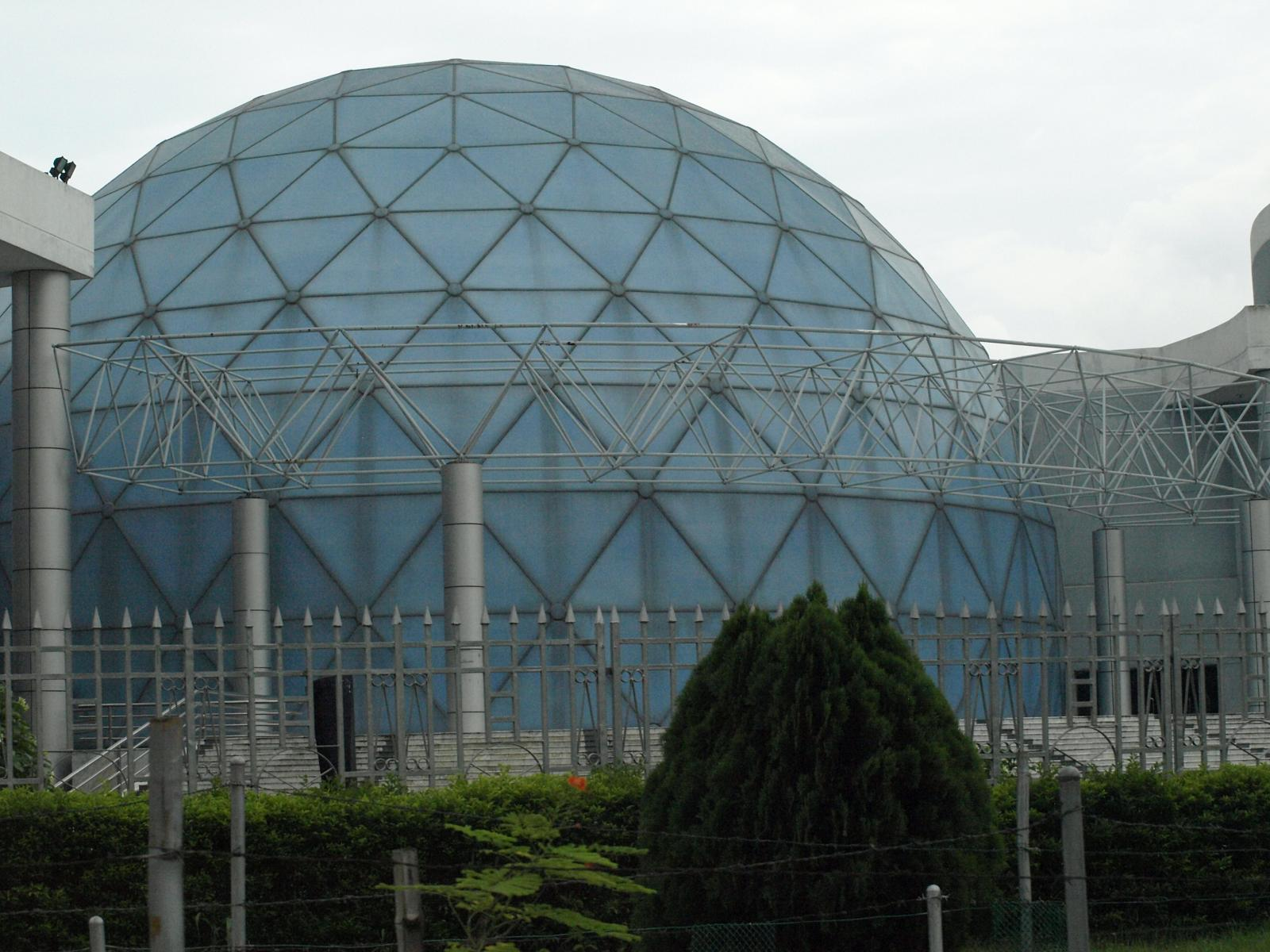
Novotheatre

== Features ==
This planetarium features three kinds of exhibits. They Journey to Infinity presents a celestial show of stars, planets and other heavenly bodies in virtual reality. The ai amader Bangladesh features Bangabandhu Sheik Mujibur Rahman's 7 March lecture, while The Grand Canyon describes North America's settlement clan, Garikhad, which existed in The Grand Canyon four thousand years ago.

Visitors need not look up in the dome to watch the show. Instead, they feel they are watching space live, with everything around them, presented by 150 projectors. The planetarium added a new capsule simulator and smart-step floor and 3D video. In 2013 the planetarium added a Nuclear Industrial Information Centre.

== See also ==
- List of planetariums
