= Bijoy Sarani =

Road in Dhaka, Bangladesh

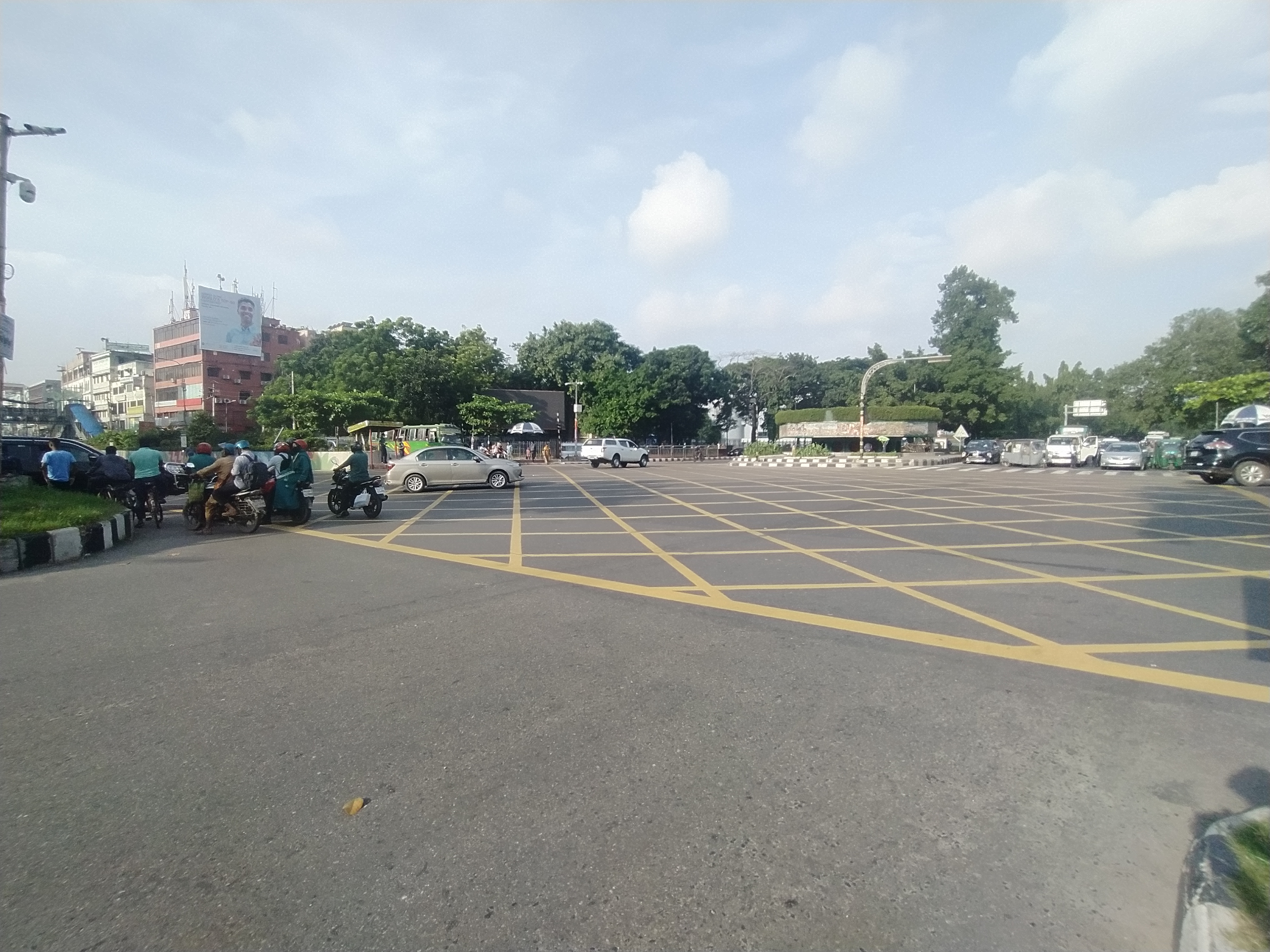
- Interactive map of Bijoy Sarani
- Namesake: Victory Day
- Type: Avenue
- Maintained by: Dhaka North City Corporation
- Length: 1.5 km (0.93 mi)
- Location: Dhaka, Bangladesh
- Coordinates: 23.76478°N 90.38614°E
- West end: Rokya Avenue
- East end: Bijoy Sarani Intersection

Bijoy Sarani (Bengali: বিজয় সরণি romanised: 'Bijoy Shoroni' lit. 'Victory Avenue') is major street in Dhaka, Bangladesh. Located between Farmgate and Tejgaon Airport, it connects Sony Rangs Building, Khamarbari and Rokeya Sarani. Bijoy Sarani fountain and Aircraft Sculpture are located on either side of the busy avenue. Novo Theatre and Military Museum are located here.

== Notable places ==
- Bijoy Sarani metro station
- Novo Theatre
- Bangladesh Military Museum
- Sheikh Mujibur Rahman statue destruction

== Gallery ==
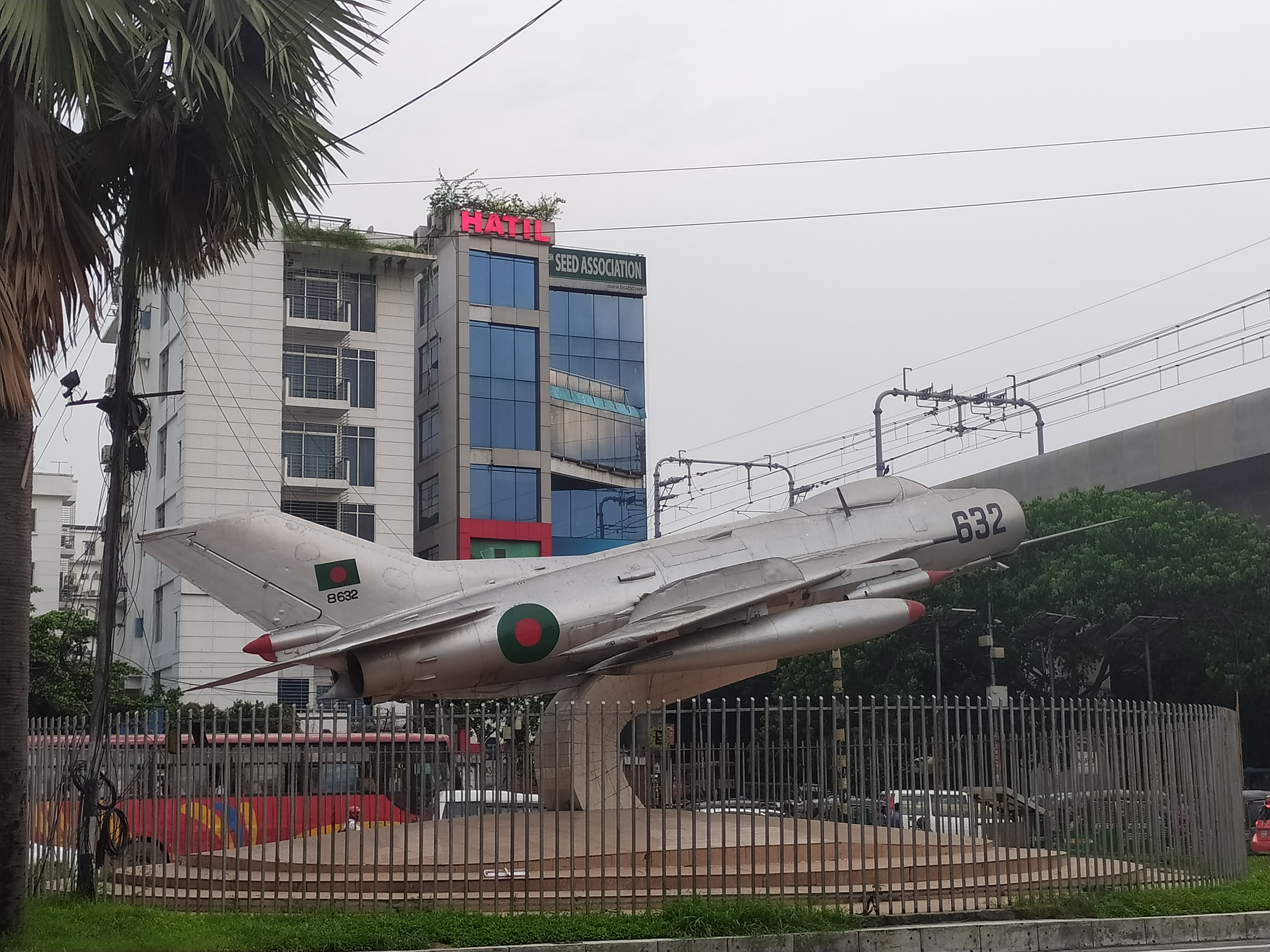
Fighter plane

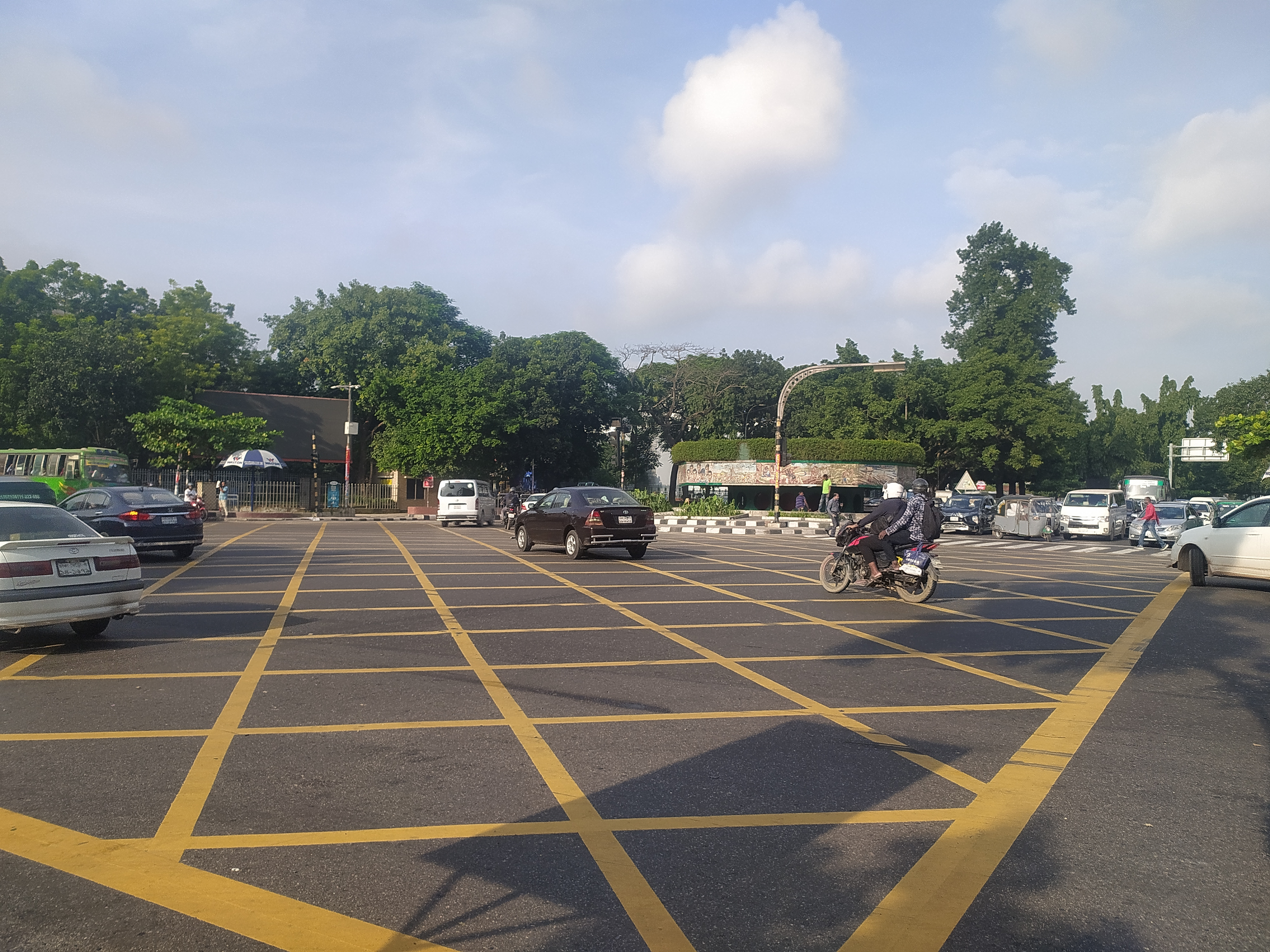
Bijoy Sarani turn

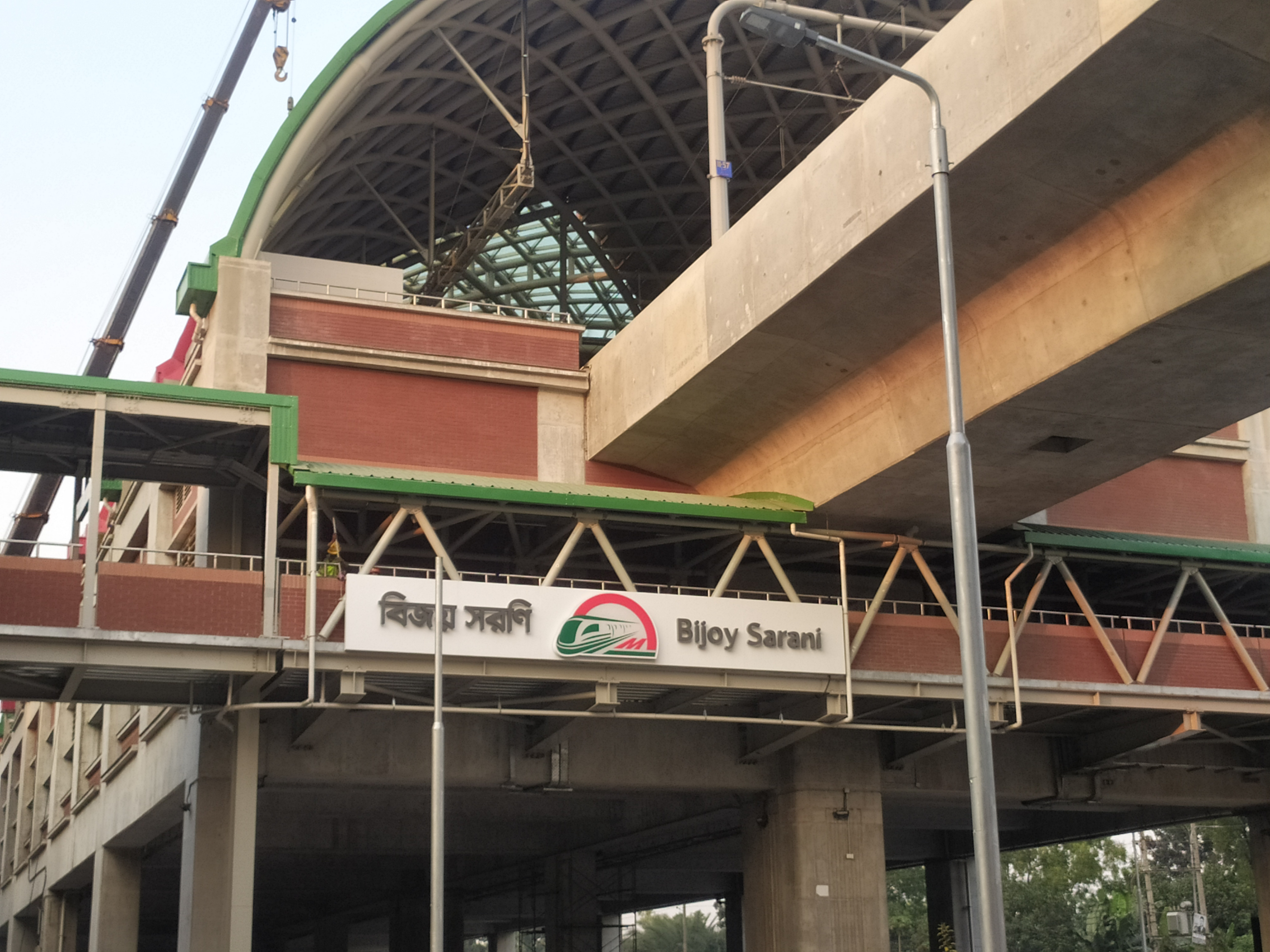
Metro station

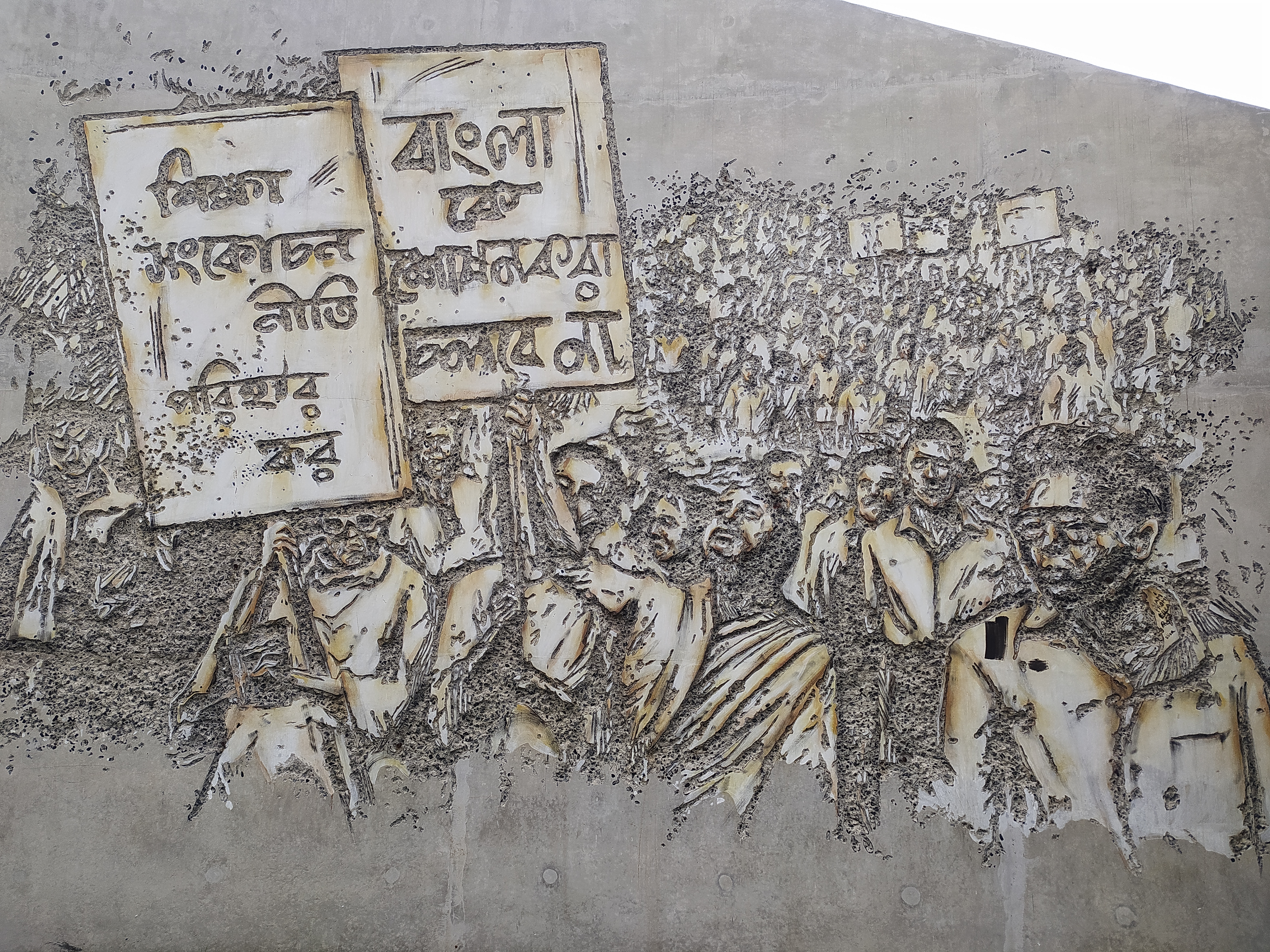
Mrityunjayee Prangan
