= Tanvir Hasan Zoha =

Bangladeshi IT expert and prosecutor

Tanvir Hassan Zoha is a Bangladeshi cybersecurity specialist and prosecutor at the International Crimes Tribunal. He was a victim of enforced disappearance in 2016 under the Sheikh Hasina-led Awami League government after he made comments criticising Bangladesh Bank officials following the 2016 Bangladesh Bank robbery by hacking. He is a professor at the Daffodil International University.

== Early life ==
Zoha completed his bachelor's degree in electrical and electronic engineering from Ahsanullah University of Science and Technology and a master's degree in communication engineering from United International University.

== Career ==
Zoha worked as a digital forensic examiner at Insight Bangladesh Foundation from August 2013 to December 2014. He then worked at Pinecone Cyber Defense from 2014 to 2015. From January 2015 to February 2017, he worked as a computer forensic investigator at Polaris Forensic Limited.

=== Enforced Disappearance ===
On 17 March 2016, The Daily Star reported that Zoha, then aged 32, was allegedly picked up by plainclothes men near Dhaka Cantonment while travelling home. This came days after the ICT Division stated that he was not affiliated with it, following media reports that had described him as one of its officials. The Home Minister Asaduzzaman Khan Kamal said he could not confirm whether law enforcement had detained Zoha, and his family said police stations had declined to accept their complaint. It was days after he had spoken to the media about the Bangladesh Bank robbery. On 22 March, detectives returned him to his home; the Dhaka Metropolitan Police said he had been found near the Airport Railway Station, and no account was given of where he had been. Police said they did not question him about the disappearance because no complaint had been filed.

Zoha has been an assistant professor at Bangladesh University of Business and Technology and previously held the same rank at the Islamic University of Technology. He has lectured on digital forensics and ICT law to police and civil service trainees at the BCS Administration Academy, Detective Training School, and Institute of Information Technology, University of Dhaka. He is a director of Backdoor Private Limited.

=== ICT prosecutor ===
After the fall of the Sheikh Hasina led Awami League government, Zoha was appointed to the International Crimes Tribunal as an Assistant Attorney-General. His appointment was criticized by journalist Zulkarnain Saer.

On19 December 2025, a fire broke out at "Zoha Bhaban" in Magura, described by bdnews24.com as the family home of Zoha and Mahbubul Alam, the director-general of Bangladesh Television (BTV). According to Mirajul Islam, the district's additional superintendent of police, the fire started shortly after 10:30 pm. Police said they found plastic bottles containing petrol at the scene and described the fire as deliberately set.

In October 2026, a progress report submitted to the High Court Division in the 2012 Murder of Sagar Sarowar and Meherun Runi stated that Zoha and ICT chief prosecutor Md Aminul Islam had told the court-ordered task force that their preliminary inquiries pointed to the possible involvement of Rokeya Prachy and Ziaul Ahsan. The Attorney General told the court that the ICT prosecution team would hand its findings to the Police Bureau of Investigation after reviewing about 300 recovered CDs. On 27 October 2026, the court granted the task force a further six months and set 29 April 2027 for the next hearing.
