= 1992 Bangladesh violence =

1992 Bangladesh pogroms was a series of violence against the Bengali Hindus and other non-Muslim minorities of Bangladesh, by Islamists in protest against the demolition of the Babri Masjid in India. The incidents of violence began in December 1992 and continued till March 1993.

On 7 December, the Dhakeshwari Temple in Dhaka was attacked. The Bholanath Giri Ashram in Dhaka was attacked and looted. Hindu owned jewellery shops were looted in Old Dhaka. Hindu houses in Rayer Bazaar were set on fire.

The SAARC Quadrangular cricket tournament was affected due to the riots. On 7 December, 5,000 Muslims armed with iron rods and bamboo sticks tried to storm into the Dhaka National Stadium, where the match between Bangladesh and India A was under progress. The police fired tear gas and rubber bullets to stave off the attackers, but the match was abandoned after 8.1 overs. The organizers rescheduled the match on 10 December and the final between India A and Pakistan A on 11 December, but both of them were eventually cancelled.

On 8 December, Hindus were attacked in Kutubdia Upazila in Cox's Bazar District. Muslims attacked 14 Hindu temples, eight of them were burnt and six damaged. 51 Hindu houses in Ali Akbar Dale and another 30 in Choufaldandi. In Sylhet, one house was burnt in the heart of the town and 10 other temples were torched.

In Chittagong District, the Fatikchari and Mireswari villages were burnt completely. Five Hindu temples including Panchanan Dham and Tulsi Dham were attacked and damaged. In Chittagong, Hindu women were molested and abducted from the Baculia and Illias colonies.

The Minorities at Risk Project reported on the 1992 violence as such, "At least 10 people have died, many Hindu women have been raped, and hundreds of Hindu homes and temples have been destroyed." The January 1993 "Bangladesh Minority (non-Muslim) Parliamentarians' Statement on 1992 Anti-Hindu Pogrom" said that 28,000 non-Muslim homes were destroyed, 2,700 businesses and 3,600 temples and other places of worship were destroyed and that the estimates of the total loss amounted to 2 billion BDT.

== See also ==
- 1962 Rajshahi massacres
- 1964 East Pakistan riots
- Bangladesh genocide (1971)
  - Operation Searchlight
  - Chuknagar massacre
  - Jathibhanga massacre
  - Shankharibazar massacre
- 1989 Bangladesh riots
- 1990 Bangladesh anti-Hindu violence
- 2012 Chirirbandar violence
- 2012 Fatehpur violence
- 2012 Hathazari violence
- 2012 Ramu violence
- 2013 Bangladesh anti-Hindu violence
- 2014 Bangladesh anti-Hindu violence
- 2016 Nasirnagar violence
- Noakhali riots
- Persecution of Hindus in Bangladesh
- Persecution of Buddhists in Bangladesh
- Persecution of Ahmadis in Bangladesh
- Persecution of Christians in Bangladesh
- Attacks by Islamic extremists in Bangladesh
- Freedom of religion in Bangladesh
- Human rights in Bangladesh
