= 2013 Bangladesh anti-Hindu violence =

Violence in Bangladesh

- Bangladesh districts affected by 2013 anti-Hindu violence
- Location: Bangladesh
- Date: 28 February 2013 – 22 June 2013
- Target: Bengali Hindus
- Attack type: Firing, looting, vandalising Hindu temples, idols, shops and houses
- Weapons: Petrol, diesel,
- Victim: Bengali Hindus
- Perpetrator: Bangladesh Islami Chhatra Shibir
- Motive: ICT sentenced Sayeedi

2013 Bangladesh anti-Hindu violence refers to riots and attacks of vandalism on and Hindu temples and properties, during the 2013 Bangladesh violence.

These attacks began on 28 February 2013, after the International Crimes Tribunal sentenced Delwar Hossain Sayeedi, the vice-president of the Jamaat-e-Islami to death for war crimes committed during the 1971 Bangladesh War of Independence. Following the sentence, Hindus were attacked in different parts of the country. Hindu properties were looted, Hindu houses were burnt into ashes and temples were desecrated and set on fire.

While Jamaat-e-Islami was blamed for the violence, Hindu community leaders said the attacks were not only carried out by hardline Islamists but also by supporters of other mainstream political parties, including the Awami League and the main opposition Bangladesh Nationalist Party.

== Background ==
On 28 February 2013, the International Crimes Tribunal sentenced Delwar Hossain Sayeedi, the vice-president of the Jamaat-e-Islami to death for war crimes committed during the 1971 Bangladesh War of Independence. Following the sentence, activists of Jamaat-e-Islami and its student wing Islami Chhatra Shibir attacked Hindus in different parts of the country. Hindu properties were looted, Hindu houses were burnt into ashes and Hindu temples were desecrated and set on fire.

== Attacks ==
Map shows the districts (in red) where Bangladeshi Hindu community attacked by Bangladesh Jamaat-e-Islami.

According to community leaders, more than 50 Hindu temples and 1,500 Hindu homes were destroyed in 20 districts. While Jamaat-e-Islami was blamed for the violence, Hindu community leaders said the attacks were systematic and had been going on for years. They say they are not only carried out by hardline Islamists but also by supporters of other mainstream political parties, including the Awami League and the main opposition Bangladesh Nationalist Party.

=== Barisal Division ===
In Barisal District, a Hindu temple was set on fire in Nalchira Union of Gaurnadi Upazila. The Pinglakathi Sarbajaneen Durga Mandir was vandalised. On 5 March, miscreants tried to set fire to the Guthia Sarbajaneen Kali Mandir under Guthia union in Wazirpur Upazila. On the early hours of 6 March, a Kali temple was vandalised in Pakshia Union under Burhanuddin Upazila in Bhola District. The images of Kali and Mahadev were destroyed. In the evening at around 7:30 pm, a Radha Krishna temple was set on fire in Batajor Village under Bamna Upazila in Barguna District. On 12 March at around 2:45 am, two Hindu houses on New Vatikhana Road in Barisal were set ablaze by unknown criminals. Locals doused the flames before spreading. In the early hours, burglars broke open a Radha Govinda temple in Kuripaika village of Patuakhali Sadar Upazila in Patuakhali District and stole the Madanmohan idol and 2.5 bharis of gold. On 4 April, a Hindu temple at Kathalia Upazila under Jhalokati District was burned down.

=== Chittagong Division ===
In Noakhali District several Hindu homes and temples came under the attack of the Islamists. On the morning of 28 February, the activists of Jamaat-e-Islami and Islami Chhatra Shibir began to gather near Rajganj Bazar in Begumganj Upazila. At around 2 pm, immediately after the verdict, the activists armed with sticks, started a procession in protest against the verdict. The procession vandalised the Kali temple at Rajganj Bazar and the temple near Bainnabari. Then they attacked the Hindus in nearby Tongipar and Aladinagar villages. They vandalised eight Hindu households and looted all the valuables including money and jewellery. The temple of Bhuiyan house in Tongipar village was vandalised. Six people were injured in the attacks. The violence continued in phases till the evening. Around 6–30 p.m. Rapid Action Battalion was deployed to bring the situation under control. On 23 March, Islamic extremists vandalised and looted a temple at Companiganj Upazila On 26 March, miscreants set fire in a Hindu house at Zirtali union belonging to Begamganj Upazila.

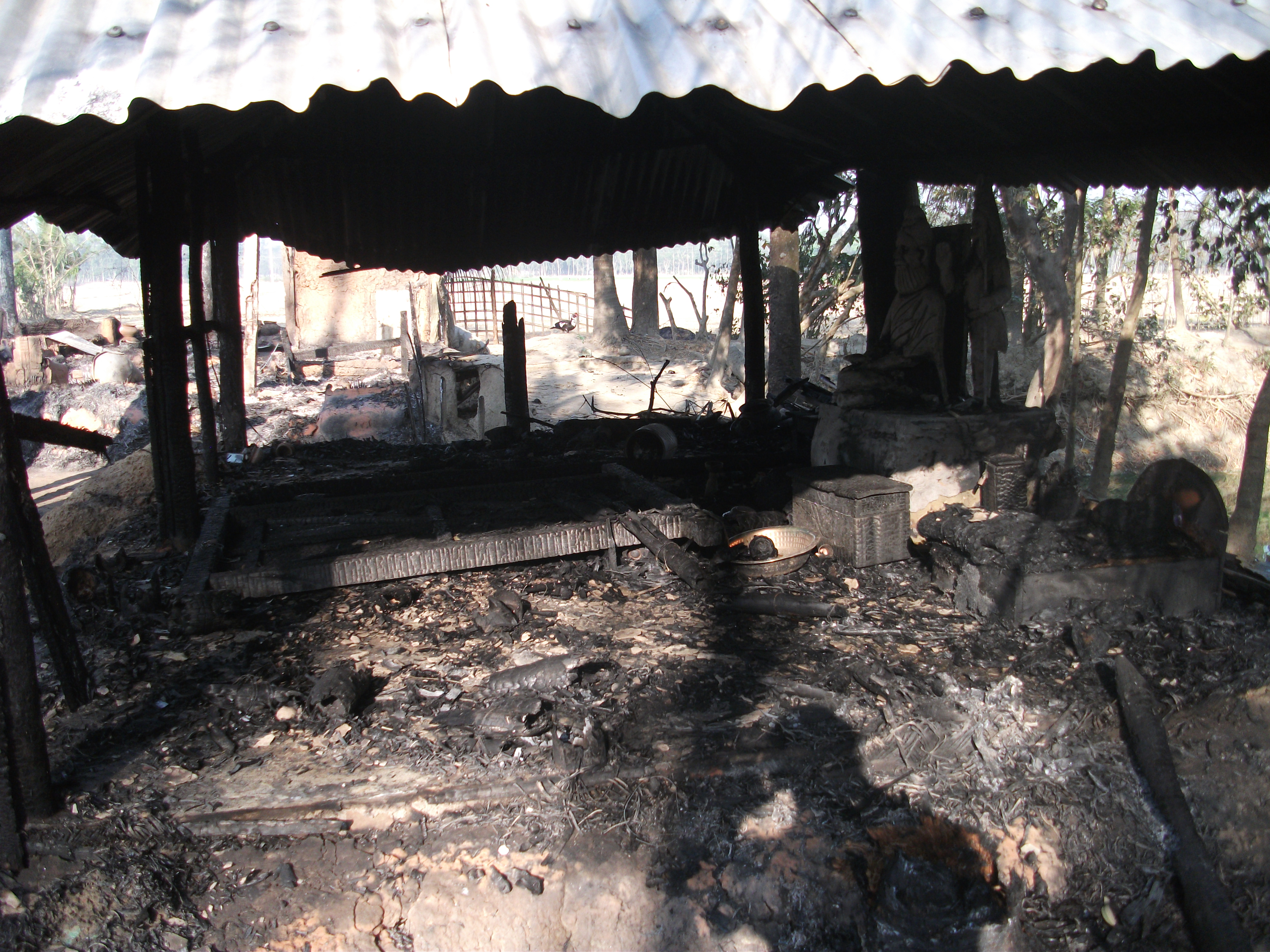
Destroyed Hindu temple in Banshkhali Upazila.

In Lakshmipur District, five Hindu-owned jewellery shops were looted and one Hindu temple attacked and looted in Chandraganj. After the midnight of 28 February, one Hindu temple has been on fire in Gaiyarchar in Raipur Upazila. The police prevented the rioters from setting fire to another temple. Two Hindu monasteries were set on fire. On 1 March, the miscreants set fire to a Hindu house in Char Sita area of Ramgati Upazila. On 11 May, Miscreants set fire on a Hindu Temple at Ramganj Upazila.

On 28 February, in the afternoon Jamaat-e-Islami and Islami Chhatra Shibir activists attacked the Hindus in Chittagong District. In Banshkhali Upazila, the attackers set fire to Hindus houses in Dakshin Jaldi area of Jaldi Union. 20 houses were gutted. 16 Hindus were injured in the arson, two of the died. A 65-year-old Hindu was killed in the attacks. On early morning of 5 March at around 2–30 a.m., the Sarbajaneen Magadeshwari Mandir at East Rupkania of Satkania Upazila was torched. At around 3:30 am the Khetrapal Temple was burned to ashes and money from donation box was looted.

In Cox's Bazar, the Jamaat activists destroyed three Hindu temples. In Kutubdia Upazila, thousands of Jamaat-e-Islami and Islami Chhatra Shibir activists gathered before the Upazila Parishad office around 9 pm. Around 10 p.m. they set fire to Hindu temples, after vandalising government offices and an Awami League party office.

In Comilla District, image of a Hindu deity was vandalised in Brahmanpara Upazila. On 1 March at around 11 pm, eleven shops including four owned by the Hindus were set on fire in Kheora Bazar in Kasba Upazila of Brahmanbaria District. On the early morning of 6 March, some time after 2:30 a.m., unidentified miscreants set fire to Sarbajanin Kali Mandir after vandalising five idols at Chapatali village under Mohammadpur East Union in Daudkandi Upazila of the district.

In Rangamati District, Bangladesh Nationalist Party and Jamaat-e-Islami Bangladesh activists set fire in a temple at Bagahichari Upazila on 28 March.

=== Dhaka Division ===
On 3 March, in Lohajang Upazila of Munshiganj District a Kali Temple was set on fire by arsonits. On the same day, in Kotalipara Upazila of Gopalganj District, a Hindu temple is burnt down. Six people including a Jamaat leader were arrested on charges of torching this temple. Early in the morning on 6 March, Ananda Ashram Mandir of Fulbaria village under the Ballabhdi Union in Faridpur District was set on fire. On 8 March, Islamist extremists vandalised a Kali Temple at Sashangaon village under Sirajdikhan Upazila in Munshiganj District. On 11 March, a temple at Fulbaria Upazila in Mymensingh District was vandalised. Six idols were destroyed at Kafilabari Durga temple in Kotalipara Upazila of Gopalganj at the same night. On the night of 15 March, unidentified miscreants vandalised the image of Saraswati in a 77-year-old Hindu temple in Madhabpur area of Sherpur municipality in Sherpur District.

On 18 March, seven idols in Harimandir in Netrokona Sadar upazila's Bobahala have been desecrated by smashing them to pieces. On the same day in Gazipur District, the attackers damaged six idols in a Hindu temple at Dakhkhin Marta of Sreepur. On 22 March, unidentified miscreants set fire to a Lakshmi temple at Gazipur Sadar Upazila in Gazipur District.

On 2 April, the largest Hindu temple at Bhuiyanpur upazila in Tangail District was set on fire.

On 5 April, unidentified miscreants vandalised the Kali Mandir, Panchmandir and Shiv Mandir in Mirzapur of Tangail District. On the same day a Hindu temple was vandalised at Rajoir under Madaripur District during the clash of two political parties. On 19 April, Unidentified miscreants torched a Hindu temple at Mahendri village in Rajoir upazila of Madaripur District.

On 8 April, a Hindu temple in Jamalpur District was vandalised. On the same day, a Hindu temple at Fulbaria under Mymensingh District was vandalised.

=== Khulna Division ===
On the night of 28 February, miscreants vandalised a Hindu temple in Pingjour village under Chingrikhali Union in Morrelganj Upazila of Bagerhat District. The Dumuria Sharbajaneen temple under Ramachandrapur Union too was set on fire. Two Hindu houses, one belonging to a local Awami League leader, were set on fire in Banogram Union. On 3 April, Miscreants torched a Hindu temple after vandalism of its three idols of god and goddess in the same place again. In Satkhira, Jamaat and Shibir rioters attacked Hindu houses and business establishments. In Kadamtala, City College More and Abader Hat areas of Satkhira municipality more than hundred Hindu residences and business establishments were looted and destroyed. The District Magistrate of Satkhira District promulgated Section 144 in Satkhira and certain areas of Assasuni Upazila. On 5 March, Jamaat-Shibir and BNP rioters set eight Hindu houses on fire in Khulna. On 12 March around midnight, miscreants vandalised 23 idols of Shiva at a temple at the Angita cremation ground in Kaliganj Upazila of Jhenaidah District.

On 18 March, more than 150 armed assailants attacked and vandalised the Pabla Sarbajanin Kalibari Temple in Khulna city's Banikpara around 9:30 pm. After blasting incendiaries, they ransacked the houses and shops of Hindus in the area.

=== Rajshahi Division ===
On 7 March, an idol of the Hindu Goddess Kali was destroyed and a Hindu temple was set on fire at Hatibandha Upazila of Lalmonirhat. Early in the morning on 3 March at around 3 am, unidentified miscreants set fire to the Sarbajanin Puja Sangha Mandir in the Natun Alidanga Bara Pekurtala locality of Shibganj municipality under Shibganj Upazila in Chapainawabganj District. A portion of the temple was gutted in the fire. After the incident, the local Hindus were living in fear. On the night of 12 March, miscreants broke into a Hari temple in Pakuria village under Singra Upazila of Natore District and destroyed the idol. On 19 March, idols were desecrated in four Hindu temples of Gabtali Upazila in Bogra District.

=== Rangpur Division ===
On 28 February, activists of Jamaat-e-Islami and its student wing Islami Chhatra Shibir attacked a Hindu temple and destroyed Hindu-owned business establishments in Gaibandha District. In the evening, they vandalised some houses in the Shobhaganj Union. The Hindu community leaders complained that the attackers had vandalised the central Kali temple at Mithapukur Upazila in Rangpur District.

Shortly after the midnight of 2 March, around 30–40 miscreants, shouting abuses and threatening the Hindus, attacked their homes at Uttar Maheshpur village in Raniganj area of Dinajpur Sadar Upazila of Dinajpur District. They set fire to the homes and haystacks of 12 Hindu peasant families, as they barely managed to escape alive. At around 1 a.m. two fire brigade units from Dinajpur arrived and doused the fire. By that time, the homes were completely reduced to ashes. Jamat-Shibir activists also blocked the Joypurhat-Bogra highway for three hours.

On 5 March, the Sree Sree Shoshan Kali Mandir at Rotherpar village in Aditmari upazila of Lalmonirhat District was vandalised. On 7 March, fire was set to a Hindu temple after destroying goddess Kali idol at Hatibandha upazila of Lalmonirhat. Sree Sree Kali Mandir at Bejgram village was also burnt down at night.

On 8 March, a Radha Gobinda temple is burnt down in Rangpur city.

=== Sylhet Division ===
On 12 March, miscreants set fire around a temple at Juri Upazila in Maulvi Bazar District. But the people living around the temple quickly took the fire under control.

== Reactions ==
=== Domestic ===
The leaders of the Bangladesh Hindu Buddhist Christian Unity Council and the Bangladesh Puja Udjapan Parishad held a human chain at the National Press Club in Dhaka and Chittagong on 2 March in protest of the atrocities on minorities in Bangladesh. At the meeting, the Hindu leaders expressed deep concerns in the recent developments and stated that the Jamaat-e-Islami had once again engaged in extermination of the minorities from Bangladesh as it did in 1971. On 3 March, the Bangladesh High Court directed the Government to ensure security of the Hindus in Noakhali District and repair the temples and houses of the Hindus destroyed in the attacks. It also issued suo moto notice to the Noakhali District police, the district administration and the Inspector General of Police to take action against the persons involved in the attacks.

Khaleda Zia, the chairperson of opposition party BNP, also expressed her concern about communal attack on Hindus.

On 6 March, Hindus across the country protested against the violence.

=== Foreign ===
In India, activists of Gairik Bharat burned an effigy of Sheikh Hasina in Silchar, in protest against her failure to protect the Hindu minorities in Bangladesh. The Bharatiya Janata Party, West Bengal unit demands the central government to create pressure on Bangladesh government to protect the Hindus from Islamic extremism. In Rajya Sabha, the upper house of Indian parliament, main opposition Bharatiya Janata Party demanded that an all-party delegation be sent to Bangladesh to assess the "atrocities on Hindus" by Jamaat-e-Islami. On the other hand, Muslim radicals of West Bengal stand for Delwar Hossain Sayeedi and Jamaat-e-Islami with conviction. Expressing serious concern on the continued attacks on the Hindus in Bangladesh the South Assam Bengali Hindu Association demanded the intervention of the Indian President Pranab Mukherjee in stopping the atrocities on Hindus in Bangladesh.

The British High Commissioner in Dhaka, Mr. Robert Gibson expressed his deep concern and resentment upon the attack upon the religious places and the recent attacks in a press conference on Sunday 3 March held in Dhaka.

On 4 March, the United States Department of State expressed concerns over the attacks on Hindu temples and homes in Bangladesh. Dan Mozena US Ambassador to Bangladesh express concern about attack of Jamaat on Bengali Hindu community.

The Amnesty International has called upon the Bangladesh government for giving better protection to the minority Hindus in the country. In a 6 March report, titled 'Bangladesh: Wave of Violent Attacks Against Hindu Minority', the Amnesty said as many as 40 Hindu temples were vandalised in attacks by supporters of an Islamic party. Several hundred were rendered homeless as shops and houses belonging to the Hindu community were burnt down over the past week, it said. The report gave Bangladesh's war crimes trial as the "context" to the violence against the Hindus.

At the House of Lords in the British Parliament, Baroness Sayeeda Warsi condemned the attacks on minorities and their places of worship in Bangladesh. She stated that 24 places of worship, 112 homes and about a dozen business establishment belonging to the minority Hindus came under attack. According to Lord Avebury, the recent attacks are recurrence of the 2001 attack on the Hindus.

Although, there was local reporting of the anti-Hindu atrocities, there was little to no exposure from international media, but images from the attacks continued to be spread on social media.

== List of temples attacked ==
Date	Temple	Place	Upazila	District	Division
28 February 2013	Kali temple	Rajganj	Begumganj Upazila	Noakhali District	Chittagong Division
28 February 2013	Hindu temple	Bainnabari	Begumganj Upazila	Noakhali District	Chittagong Division
28 February 2013	Hindu temple	Pingjour	Morrelganj Upazila	Bagerhat District	Khulna Division
1 March 2013	Hindu temple	Gaiyarchar	Raipur Upazila	Lakshmipur District	Chittagong Division
2 March 2013	Pinglakathi Sarbajanin Durga Mandir	Nalchira	Gaurnadi Upazila	Barisal District	Barisal Division
2 March 2013	Hindu temple	Ramchandrapur	Morrelganj Upazila	Bagerhat District	Khulna Division
3 March 2013	Kali temple	Goalimandra	Lohajang Upazila	Munshiganj District	Dhaka Division
3 March 2013	Sarbajaneen Puja Sangha Mandir	Alidanga	Shibganj Upazila	Nawabganj District	Rajshahi Division
4 March 2013	Kali temple	Lakirpar	Kotalipara Upazila	Gopalganj District	Dhaka Division
4 March 2013	Kali temple	Ratherpar	Aditmari Upazila	Lalmonirhat District	Rangpur Division
5 March 2013	Khetrapal temple	Nathpara	Satkania Upazila	Chittagong District	Chittagong Division
5 March 2013	Guthia Sarbajanin Kali Mandir	Guthia	Wazirpur Upazila	Barisal District	Barisal Division
5 March 2013	Hari Mandir	Pakuria	Singra Upazila	Natore District	Rajshahi Division
6 March 2013	Hindu temple	Chapatali	Daudkandi Upazila	Comilla District	Chittagong Division
6 March 2013	Hindu temple	Bangla-Dashpara	Netrokona Sadar Upazila	Netrokona District	Dhaka Division
6 March 2013	Radha Krishna Mandir	Batajor	Bamna Upazila	Barguna District	Barisal Division
6 March 2013	Kali Mandir	Pakshia	Burhanuddin Upazila	Bhola District	Barisal Division
7 March 2013	Kali temple	Shashangaon	Sirajdikhan Upazila	Munshiganj District	Dhaka Division
8 March 2013	Radha Govinda temple	Amashu Kukrul Purbapara	Rangpur Sadar Upazila	Rangpur District	Rangpur Division
10 March 2013	Kali temple	Achhim Bazar	Fulbaria Upazila	Mymensingh District	Dhaka Division
11 March 2013	Shiva temple	Khalkula	Kaliganj Upazila	Jhenaidah District	Khulna Division
11 March 2013	Durga temple	Kafilabaria	Kotalipara Upazila	Gopalganj District	Dhaka Division
11 March 2013	Radha Govinda Mandir	Amtail	Juri Upazila	Maulvi Bazar District	Sylhet Division
12 March 2013	Radha Govinda Mandir	Kuripaika	Patuakhali Sadar Upazila	Patuakhali District	Barisal Division
15 March 2013	Madhabpur Puja Mandir	Madhabpur	Sherpur Sadar Upazila	Sherpur District	Dhaka Division
18 March 2013	Hari Mandir	Bobahala	Netrokona Sadar Upazila	Netrokona District	Dhaka Division
18 March 2013	Kali Mandir	Dakshin Marta	Sreepur Upazila	Gazipur District	Dhaka Division
19 March 2013	Hindu temple	Sabekpara	Gabtali Upazila	Bogra District	Rajshahi Division
19 March 2013	Hindu temple	Karmakarpara	Gabtali Upazila	Bogra District	Rajshahi Division
19 March 2013	Hindu temple	Bamunia	Gabtali Upazila	Bogra District	Rajshahi Division
19 March 2013	Hindu temple	Kamarchatt	Gabtali Upazila	Bogra District	Rajshahi Division
22 March 2013	Shri Shri Lakshmi Mata Mandir	Keshurita Madhyapara	Gazipur Sadar Upazila	Gazipur District	Dhaka Division

== See also ==
- 1962 Rajshahi massacres
- 1964 East-Pakistan riots
- 1971 Bangladesh genocide
  - Operation Searchlight
  - Chuknagar massacre
  - Jathibhanga massacre
  - Shankharipara massacre
  - Razakar
- 1989 Bangladesh pogroms
- 1990 Bangladesh anti-Hindu violence
- 1992 Bangladesh violence
- 2012 Chirirbandar violence
- 2012 Fatehpur violence
- 2012 Hathazari violence
- 2012 Ramu violence
- 2013 Bangladesh Anti-Hindu violence
- 2014 Bangladesh anti-Hindu violence
- 2016 Nasirnagar Violence
- Noakhali riots
- Persecution of indigenous peoples in Bangladesh
- Persecution of Hindus in Bangladesh
- Persecution of Buddhists in Bangladesh
- Persecution of Chakma buddhists
- Persecution of atheists and secularists in Bangladesh
- Freedom of religion in Bangladesh
- Human rights in Bangladesh
