= 2012 Fatehpur violence =

2012 Fatehpur Violence refers to the attack on the minority Hindu community in the Fatehpur village under Kaliganj upazila in Satkhira District in south-western Bangladesh on 31 March 2012.

== Background ==
On 26 March 2012, on the occasion of Independence Day, the students of Fatehpur High School staged a play adapted from the short story 'Huzur Kebla' by eminent Bangladeshi politician and litterateur Abul Mansur Ahmed. The text is included in the syllabus of Bengali in the university degree courses. Three days later, on 29 March 2012, Dainik Drishtipat and Dainik Alor Parash, two Jamaat-e-Islami-supported local newspapers, reported that blasphemous remarks about the Islamic prophet, Muhammad, were made in the drama. Though the news was proved to be false later on, tensions began to mount once the news spread.

On 30 March, South Sripur Union Parishad member Abu Jafar Sanpui filed a case with Kaliganj police station accusing a dramatist, a headmaster, and an assistant headmaster. Police arrested the headmaster and the assistant teacher and sent them to jail.

A group of Muslims held demonstrations after Jumma prayers on Friday, blocking roads for an hour.

== Attacks ==
On Saturday, people from neighbouring areas began to gather in Fatehpur village under the banner of Touhidi Janata. Hundreds of people from Krishnanagar and Bishnupur unions and other areas assembled outside the Fatehpur village of South Sripur union. At around 9 a.m. they attacked the Fatehpur High School and Fatehpur Government Primary School with sticks, iron rods, and machetes. Then they attacked the houses of Shahinur Rahman and his three brothers and set them on fire. In the Banshtala market, they set fire to the shop of Abdul Hakim Sardar, a member of the administrative committee of Fatehpur High School. Then, as the sun set, the Muslims burnt down the house of 7 Hindu families, including Mita Rani Hazra. They also robbed valuable things from those houses.

On Sunday afternoon, rumour spread that Lalita Sardar, a Hindu housewife from Chakdaha village, had made another blasphemous remark about Muhammad. People began to gather in the Sardar residence. In the evening, Firoz Kabir Kajal, the president of the Nazimganj Bazar Committee, arrived at their house along with local union parishad members. They began to pressurize Lalita to publicly apologize for her blasphemous remarks. During this meeting, about two hundred youths from nearby villages gathered near their house and threatened to kick the family and send them to India. At around 7 pm thousands of teenagers and youths were called to the spot from the different villages of Kaliganj Upazila. The outsiders gathered around the houses of the minority Hindus and began to pelt stones and brick bats at their houses. The Hindu men, women, and children, fearing for their lives, began to run towards safety. The attackers then broke open their houses and looted their valuables, including jewelry, garments, land deeds, and other valuable documents. They also snatched the jewelry box from Lalita Sardar. After securing the loot in safe havens, the miscreants doused the houses in petrol and set them on fire. The houses of 10 Hindu families were looted and set on fire. The looting and arson took place in the presence of the police. The fire brigade was blocked from entering into the area until the houses were completely burnt. The district magistrate, district superintendent of police, the additional D.I.G. (Khulna Range) and RAB officers arrived at night and tried to bring things under control.

== Aftermath ==
A week after the attacks, the majority of the Hindu victims still remained terrorized. Members of many of the families haven't returned to their houses.

On Wednesday, 11 April 2012, the District Commissioner of Satkhira District canceled declaration of the daily drishtipat because of provocating the attack on Hindu families and failure to answer the show cause order of the High Court.

== Protests ==
As the Hindu students of Jagannath Hall of Dhaka University protested against the persecution. Bangladeshi media highlighted this event. Students of Dhaka University's Jagannath Hall staged demonstrations, putting up barricades on Shahbag-Matsya Bhaban road on Thursday morning, 5 April 2012. Nearly 500 students brought out a procession from their dormitory in the morning and later took position at Shahbagh around 10:30 am. They demanded tougher actions against the people responsible for the incident. Earlier, on Wednesday night, the students blocked Elephant-Matsya Bhaban Road for an hour on the same issue. Bangladesh Hindu Mohajot also protested against the incident.

== See also ==
- 1962 Rajshahi massacres
- 1964 East-Pakistan riots
- 1971 Bangladesh genocide
  - Operation Searchlight
  - Chuknagar massacre
  - Jathibhanga massacre
  - Shankharipara massacre
  - Razakar
- 1989 Bangladesh pogroms
- 1990 Bangladesh anti-Hindu violence
- 1992 Bangladesh violence
- 2012 Chirirbandar violence
- 2012 Hathazari violence
- 2012 Ramu violence
- 2013 Bangladesh Anti-Hindu violence
- 2014 Bangladesh anti-Hindu violence
- Noakhali riots
- Persecution of indigenous peoples in Bangladesh
- Persecution of Hindus in Bangladesh
- Persecution of Buddhists in Bangladesh
- Persecution of Chakma buddhists
- Persecution of Ahmadis in Bangladesh
- Persecution of Christians in Bangladesh
- Persecution of atheists and secularists in Bangladesh
- Freedom of religion in Bangladesh
- Human rights in Bangladesh
