= Freedom of religion in Bangladesh =

The Constitution of Bangladesh includes secularism as one of the four fundamental principles, despite having Islam as the state religion by 2A. Islam is referred to twice in the introduction and Part I of the constitution and the document begins with the Islamic phrase Basmala (بِسْمِ اللهِ الرَّحْمٰنِ الرَّحِيْمِ) which in English is translated as “In the name of Allah, the Beneficent, the Merciful” and article (2A) declares that :"Islam is the state religion of the republic". Bangladesh is mostly governed by secular laws, set up during the times when the region was ruled by the British Crown.

The constitution also states that "the State shall ensure equal status and equal right in the practice of the Hindu, Buddhist, Christian and other religions". "Freedom of religion" is its basic structure guaranteed by the Bangladeshi constitution in which it calls for equal rights to all its citizens irrespective of their religious differences and it also bans discrimination on the grounds of religion on various platforms. Bangladesh is one of the few Muslim-majority nations where "proselytizing" i.e. conversions from one religion to another are generally accepted and is legalized by law under article 41 of the constitution, subject to law, public order, and morality.

Bangladesh was founded as a secular state, but Islam was made the state religion in the 1980s. But in 2010, the High Court held up the secular principles of the 1972 constitution. The High Court also strengthened its stance against punishments by Islamic edict (fatwa), following complaints of brutal sentences carried out against women by extra-legal village courts.

== Status of religious freedom ==
=== Legal and policy framework ===
The Constitution establishes Islam as the state religion but also states that other religions can be practised in harmony. Islamic law plays a role in civil matters pertaining to the Muslim community; however, there is no formal implementation of Islamic law, and it is not imposed on non-Muslims. Family law has separate provisions for Muslims, Hindus, and Christians. Family laws concerning marriage, divorce, and adoption differ depending on the religious beliefs of the people involved. For example, under the Muslim family ordinance women inherit less and have fewer divorce rights than men. The jail code makes allowances for the observance of religious festivals by prisoners, including access to extra food for feast days or permission for religious fasting.

In 2010, the High Court held up the secular principles of the 1972 constitution. The High Court also strengthened its stance against punishments by Islamic edict (fatwa), following complaints of brutal sentences carried out against women by extra-legal village courts. In 2011, the government passed the Religious Welfare Trust (Amendment) Act, which provides funding for the newly formed Christian Religious Welfare Trust as per the Christian Religious Welfare Trust Ordinance of 1983. In 2011 the government also passed the Vested Property Return Act, which enables the potential return for property seized from the country's Hindu population.

In 2012, the government passed the Hindu Marriage Registration Act, which provides the option for Hindus to register their marriages with the government. The aim of this bill was to protect the rights of Hindu women, whose rights are not protected under religious marriage. In 2013, Supreme Court deregistered the Jamaat-e-Islami, the largest Islamist political party, for violating the constitution, thereby banning it from participating in elections. However, the ban was not enforced in practice. Ensuring non-discrimination is a foundational principle enshrined in the Constitution of Bangladesh. Article 27 explicitly states that every citizen is equal before the law and has the right to receive equal protection under the law.

=== Education ===
Religious studies are compulsory and part of the curriculum in all government schools. Students attend classes in which their own religious beliefs are taught. Schools with few students from minority religious groups are generally allowed to make arrangements with local churches or temples to hold religious studies classes outside of school hours. The government operates training academies for imams, and monitors the content of religious education in Islamic religious schools, or madrassahs, and announced its intention to make changes to the curriculum, including modernising and mainstreaming the content of religious education.

There are tens of thousands of madrassahs, some of which are funded by the Government. However, there were two types of madrassahs in the country: Qaumi and Alia. Qaumi madrassahs operated outside of the government's purview. Therefore, Alia madrassahs received support and curriculum oversight from the government whereas Qaumi madrassahs did not.

However, in most cases, the teachers in the religious and moral education classes in Bangladeshi schools specifically place more emphasis on subject Islam than universal religious education, and the non-Muslim students hardly or even don't receive formal education from their institutions and thus have to study on their own. Semi-governmental educational institutions often appoint mawlanas to conduct religious classes who are reluctant to teach non-Muslim students their own textbooks. In the country's national curriculum, as part of the subject Bengali, Prophet Muhammad's Farewell Sermon is taught to all students regardless of religion and caste in 5th grade; the continuity of study on Muhammad's life-related topics can be seen in the later classes as well and is obligatory for students from all creeds. Islamic History and Heritage is also included in humanities at college level.

== Persecution ==
In the first half of 2026, between January and June, at least 44 people members of religious minority communities were killed in 40 incidents across the country according to Bangladesh Hindu Buddhist Christian Unity Council. The organisation's acting general secretary also claimed in a July press conference that violence had increasingly taken a sectarian turn, with members of religious minority communities becoming the main targets. In the same six-month period, at least 257 incidents of sectarian attacks had taken place across the country. The organisation also recorded 15 incidents involving attacks on places of worship, vandalism of idols, attacks on Durga Puja congregations, looting and arson.

=== Persecution of Hindus ===
Hindus have been persecuted by Islamists in Bangladesh and have been subjected to acts of mob violence, arson, murder, and disappearance. The Minority Rights Group International reported that Hindus disproportionally suffer from land grabbing. It also said as a result of the Vested Property Act, millions of Hindus migrated or were displaced from their homes, emigrating to India, causing a decline of the community's population to 9% in 2018 from 22% in the 1940s. Political events such as elections have been accompanied by communal violence. The Dalit population within the Hindu community has also been marginalized and discriminated against by higher-castes. List of massacres targeted at Hindus and Buddhists minorities, mainly by radical Islamists and Razakar:

- 1946 Noakhali riots
- 1962 Rajshahi massacres
- 1964 East-Pakistan riots
- 1971 Bangladesh genocide
  - Operation Searchlight
  - Chuknagar massacre
  - Jathibhanga massacre
  - Shankharipara massacre
  - Razakar
- 1989 Bangladesh pogroms
- 1990 Bangladesh anti-Hindu violence
- 1992 Bangladesh violence
- 2012 Chirirbandar violence
- 2012 Fatehpur violence
- 2012 Hathazari violence
- 2013 Bangladesh Anti-Hindu violence
- 2014 Bangladesh anti-Hindu violence
- 2016 Nasirnagar Violence
- 2021 Bangladesh Communal Violence

In 2016 violence over blasphemy accusations lead to the destruction of 15 temples and 100 homes though authorities suggest only 8 temples and 22 houses were damaged. According to a Bangladesh Jatiya Hindu Mohajote (BJHM) report in 2017 alone, at least 107 people of the Hindu community were killed and 31 fell victims to enforced disappearance 782 Hindus were either forced to leave the country or threatened to leave. Besides, 23 were forced to get converted into other religions. At least 25 Hindu women and children were raped, while 235 temples and statues were vandalized during the year. The total number of atrocities happened with the Hindu community in 2017 is 6474. During the 2019 Bangladesh elections, eight houses belonging to Hindu families on fire in Thakurgaon alone.

=== Persecution of Christians ===
In 2023 the country was ranked as the 30th worst place in the world to be a Christian. In 2018, Bangladesh was number 41 on the World Watch List for religious persecution of Christians, between UAE and Algeria. In 2016, four people were murdered for their Christian faith. The growing Christian population is met by growing persecution.

=== Persecution of Buddhists ===
Buddhists in Bangladesh, constituting less than 1% of the population have faced significant challenges, particularly in the Chittagong Hill Tracts (CHT), where over 65% of the country’s Buddhist population resides. There are also accusations that Chakmas have been pressured to abandon their religion. The government's initiative to promote Bengali Muslim settlement in the Chittagong Hill Tracts (CHT) altered the demographic composition from 98% indigenous in 1971 to around 50% by 2000, resulting in land conflicts and violent confrontations.

The 2012 Ramu violence stands out as a notable example of violence, where mobs attacked Buddhist monasteries and homes in Cox’s Bazar District, destroying 24 temples and 75 houses, triggered by a rumored blasphemous image on social media falsely attributed to a Buddhist youth. The government, under Prime Minister Sheikh Hasina, condemned the attacks and funded temple reconstruction, arresting over 300 individuals, though community leaders criticized the response as inadequate. Outside the CHT, Buddhists, particularly the Barua community in urban areas like Chittagong and Dhaka, generally live in relative harmony with the Muslim majority.

=== Persecution of Ahmadis ===
Ahmadis have been targeted by various protests and acts of violence, and fundamentalist Islamic groups have demanded that Ahmadis be officially declared kafirs (infidels).

=== Persecution of atheists ===
Several Bangladeshi atheists have been assassinated, and a "hit list" exists issued by the Bangladeshi Islamic organisation, the Ansarullah Bangla Team. Activist atheist bloggers are leaving Bangladesh under threat of assassination.

== International View ==
A 2020 report found that Bangladesh was in the top 5 countries with the highest levels of social hostilities involving religion. A 2021 reported several examples of violence and terror directed at religious minorities. In 2022, Freedom House rated Bangladesh’s religious freedom as 2 out of 4, noting that members of minority groups - including Hindus, Christians, Buddhists, and Shiite and Ahmadiyya Muslims - continue to face harassment and violence, including mob violence against their houses of worship. Bangladesh scored 0.75 in 2020 and a perfect 1.00 in both 2021 and 2022 on the World Bank's Freedom of Religion index.

== See also ==
- Religion in Bangladesh
- 1971 Bangladesh genocide
- Human rights and persecution of non-Muslims in Bangladesh
