= 2016 Nasirnagar violence =

2016 attack in Nasirnagar Upazila, Bangladesh

The 2016 Nasirnagar violence was an attack on the minority Hindu community led by radical Islamist groups in Nasirnagar Upazila, Bangladesh over an allegedly defamatory social media post by a Hindu fisherman against Islam on 30 October 2016. The attack left 19 temples and approximately 300 houses vandalized and over 100 people injured.

== Beginning of the incident ==
In Haripur village under Nasirnagar, Rasraj Das was accused of uploading a picture on Facebook, where a picture of the Kaaba has been superimposed with a photo of Shiva. On October 29, a group of Islamic radicals beat Rasraj Das and handed him to the cops. He was booked for blasphemy under section 57(2) of the ICT act and sent to jail. Several Islamic organizations held protest rallies, though it was later acknowledged by Rasraj that he didn't know how to use Facebook and hadn't written the post himself—his account had been hacked, and the post was no longer to be found.

== Attack ==
In 2016, an organization called "Pure Ahle Sunnat Wal Jamaat" organized a rally and a protest within the premises of Nasirnagar Government College on the grounds that religious sentiments had been hurt or insulted. The attacks on the local Hindu community were initiated from this rally. Approximately 3,000 Muslims participated in this assault. Almost three hundred houses, temples including the Gaur Temple in Nasirnagar, idols of various deities, furniture, and donation boxes were vandalized in eight Hindu localities. They stole televisions, expensive items, and currency. More than fifty men and women were injured during the attack. The house of Rasraj was vandalized and Shankar Sen, priest of Gaur Temple at Mahakal Para was seriously injured. The priest of the Gaur Temple, Narendra Prabhu, was attacked. Jagannath Temple in Paschim Para, Kali Bari Temple in Namashudra Para, Shiva Temple in Mahakal Para, Durga Temple, Loknath Temple in Shil Para, Dattabari Temple in Datta Para, Kali Temple in Sutrodhar Para and the Sri Sri Anandamayi Kali Temple and other15 temples and more than 300 houses were vandalized and looted. Yet another attack on the Hindu population of Nasirnagar took place on 4 November. The local Member of Parliament and then Minister of Fisheries and Livestock, Mohammad Sayedul Haque, was partly blamed for the incident following derogatory remarks. It was also alleged that Awami League leaders instigated the attacks. The "mastermind" behind the incident was identified as Dewan Atiqur Rahman Akhi, chairman of Haripur Union and a member of the Awami League. Other Awami League leaders allegedly involved were Habibur Rahman's brother, Md. Akhtar Mia, chairman of Purvabhag Union, and Abul Hashem, chairman of Nasirnagar Sadar Union.

== Aftermath of the attack ==
A total of eight cases were filed in connection with the Nasirnagar attacks. One was investigated by Detective Branch, and the remaining six by Nasirnagar police. More than two thousand suspects had been identified and 126 of them arrested and brought before the court. No blasphemous image was uploaded from the mobile device of Rasraj Das, a forensic report said. After the forensic findings, the court granted Rasraj temporary bail on January 16, 2017. He is still an accused in the case and keeps appearing in court dates. No police report has been submitted yet in respect of the case. On January 5, 2017, police arrested Dewan Atiqur Rahman Akhi in Dhaka's Vatara. Akhi got bail from the High Court on November 6, 2017.

== Response ==
Bangladesh Hindu, Buddhist and Christian Unity Council condemned the attacks. In a press release, its General Secretary Rana Dasgupta said:

This is not an isolated incident. This incident challenges the government's zero-tolerance policy against communalism.

He called for action against those involved. Awami League received nationwide criticism as Dewan Atiqur Rahman Akhi, an Awami League member, was identified as the mastermind of the incident. The Ministry of Local Government, Rural Development, and Co-operatives had temporarily suspended Akhi from his Union Parishad member post on January 23, 2017. Later, Akhi was reinstated, and he continued the post. In the 2021 election, despite involvement in the violence, Atiqur Rahman Akhi, Md. Akhtar Mia, and Abul Hashem received the nomination of the chairman of Union Parishad from the Awami League. The Awami League withdrew the nominations of Abul Hashem and Atiqur Rahman Akhi on October 13 amid widespread criticism.

== See also ==
- 1971 Bangladesh genocide
  - Operation Searchlight
  - Chuknagar massacre
  - Razakar
- 2012 Chirirbandar violence
- 2012 Fatehpur violence
- 2012 Hathazari violence
- 2012 Ramu violence
- Noakhali riots
- Persecution of indigenous peoples in Bangladesh
- Persecution of Hindus in Bangladesh
- Persecution of Buddhists in Bangladesh
- Persecution of Chakma buddhists
- Persecution of Ahmadis in Bangladesh
- Persecution of Christians in Bangladesh
- Persecution of atheists and secularists in Bangladesh
- Freedom of religion in Bangladesh
- Human rights in Bangladesh
