= 2014 Bangladesh anti-Hindu violence =

Anti-Hindu Violence

On 5 January 2014, the 10th general elections were held in Bangladesh. The opposition Bangladesh Nationalist Party and its ally Jamaat-e-Islami had already boycotted the elections. The buildup to the elections was marred by successive strikes and violence by the opposition parties. Victims claimed that after the polls, workers and supporters of the opposition parties began attacking the minority Bengali Hindus. People were accused of looting, vandalising and setting the Hindu houses on fire in several districts across the country. Seven persons belonging to the Jamaat-e-Islami and the Bangladesh Nationalist Party were arrested in connection with the attacks. The National Human Rights Commission held the government responsible for the attacks on Hindus after the election. In India, the opposition Bharatiya Janata Party condemned the attacks on minorities.

== Attacks ==
=== Chittagong Division ===
On 5 January, in the evening, Hindus were attacked in the Satkania Upazila, Lohagara Upazila, and Banshkhali Upazila of Chittagong District. Cadres of Jamaat-e-Islami and Islami Chhatra Shibir set at least 150 Hindu houses on fire. In Lohagara Upazila, activists of Jamaat-e-Islami and BNP looted and vandalised shops belonging to Hindus in Hindur Hat in the Kolujan area. They also attempted to vandalise a Hindu temple.

In Lakshmipur District, on 9 January at night, a Kali temple in Narayanpur village under Ramganj Upazila was set on fire.

In Sonagazi Upazila of Feni District, Islamic fundamentalists burnt Shree Shree Dakshinashwer temple on 16 January. They also looted valuable things from the temple.

=== Dhaka Division ===
In Netrakona District, a Kali temple was vandalised and set on fire after midnight on 7 January.

In Bade-dudhkora village of Netrokona Sadar Upazila, Islamist fundamentalists burnt another Kali temple. The temple was situated at the house of Mr. Chandan, who was a member of the local union parishad.

In Gazipur District, unidentified miscreants set fire to the homestead of a Hindu family in the Bhakoadi Malibari area under Chandpur Union of Kapasia Upazila in the wee hours of 10 January.

In Dhaka City Corporation South, International Society for Krishna Consciousness (ISKCON) Temple at Swamibagh, which is also ISKCON headquarters in Bangladesh, is attacked by more than 100 Muslims at about 10:20 pm (local time) on 30 June 2014.

=== Khulna Division ===
In Abhaynagar Upazila of Jessore District, at around 10 am on 5 January, 70 to 80 workers of the opposition parties hacked five Hindu men for casting their votes. As the police fired in the air to save the victims, the attackers fled, threatening to return with dire consequences. At around 6 pm, around 250 workers of the Jamaat-e-Islami and the Bangladesh Nationalist Party, armed with sharp weapons and sticks, attacked the Hindu-inhabited Malopara village, where they vandalised 130 houses and set another 10 on fire. The activists of Jamaat-e-Islami and Islami Chhatra Shibir, armed with firearms, Molotov cocktails, machetes, iron rods, and sticks, chased the Hindus, when about 100 of them jumped into the Bhairab River and swam to the other side. The coconut and banana trees were either chopped or burnt. The cowsheds were burnt. Idols were desecrated. At least 20 persons were injured in the attack. Around 600 Hindus from the village swam across the Bhairab and took shelter in the Diyapara village under Sridhar Union.

On 7 January at night, masked men raided two Hindu houses in Hajrail Rishipalli of Manirampur Upazila in Jessore District. They held the men hostage and gang-raped two housewives.

In Bagerhat District, one Radha Govinda temple and one Kali temple were set on fire on the night of 8 January in Kachubunia in Morrelganj Upazila. On 9 January, Radhagobinda Sebashram of Ramchandrapur and Shree Shree Shyma temple were burnt by islami fundamentalists. In Morrelganj Upazila again, Islamic fundamentalists burnt saswati puja mandap of Rdha Gobinda temple on 16 January.

In Magura District, gold ornaments and money were stolen from two Hindu temples in the Satdoha area of Magura town in Magura Sadar Upazila on 10 January. Miscreants broke into the two temples of Sri Sri Nengta Babar Ashram in the wee hours and took away gold and silver ornaments and the cash from the donation box.

In Satkhira District, 46 houses and establishments belonging to Hindus were vandalised and another six were set on fire on the night of 5 January. The miscreants accused the Hindus of voting for the Awami League.

=== Rangpur Division ===
On 5 January in the morning, hundreds of workers of the opposition parties attacked Kornai village in Sadar Upazila of Dinajpur District. They looted eight Hindu-owned shops and 12 Hindu houses and set them on fire.

On 7 January at night, activists of the Bangladesh Nationalist Party and the Jamaat-e-Islami destroyed two houses and five shops belonging to the Hindus in Kuptola Union of Gaibandha Sadar Upazila in Gaibandha District. Five persons were injured in the attack.

In Lalmonirhat District, Hindus by and large abstained from voting, due to threats from the opposition parties coupled with a lack of security from the administration. According to the general secretary of Lalmonirhat Puja Udjapan Parishad, only 4–5% of the Hindus had cast their votes in the district. More than 100 Hindu families of Shafinagar and Senpara villages were threatened by Jamaat-e-Islami and Islami Chhatra Shibir after the polls. On 8 January, the house of the caretaker of a Hindu temple in Shafinagar was set on fire.

In Thakurgaon District, around 1,200 Hindus from 500 Hindu families of Gopalpur village took shelter in an ISKCON temple.

=== Rajshahi Division ===
In Bogra District, activists of Jamaat-e-Islami and BNP attacked the Hindus in Nandigram Upazila. In Joypurhat District, one Hindu house was set on fire in Kusumba Union of Joypurhat Sadar Upazila. One elderly person died of a heart attack due to panic from the fire. The Hindus of Boalia village under Sukash Union of Natore District were threatened not to vote in the elections. In spite of the threats, three Hindus cast their votes on 5 January. After the polls, their houses were set on fire.

Islamists fundamentalists again attacked in Nandigram Upazila of Bogra District. On 12 January, after the national election, they set on fire some haystacks and some houses and looted a tube well of Hindu families.

=== Barisal Division ===
In Barisal District, a Hindu family was kicked out of their house, situated in Thaneshwarkathi village of Agailjhara Upazila. A Jubo League cadre of the present government party, the Awami League, came to take possession of Mr. Tapan Sarker's house with a gang of terrorists. Then they beat Mr. Tapan and their family members. After that the family took shelter in a classroom of a nearby primary school.

In Bhandaria Upazila of Pirojpur District, Islamic fundamentalists burnt an ancient Durga temple on 12 January after the 5 January national election of Bangladesh. Those fundamentalists burnt that temple to ashes.

=== Government version ===
On 23 February 2014, The Daily Star, a national English newspaper, published a summary report submitted by the police authority to the country's High Court. According to this report, around 160 incidents of attacks and atrocities on Hindus took place in 21 districts after the 5 January parliamentary polls, causing loss of Hindu properties worth ৳4 million. Such atrocities included injuring Hindu people, damaging their houses, temples and business establishments and setting them on fire, and looting valuables causing a loss of around ৳4 million in 70 of those attacks.

== Reactions ==
=== Domestic ===
- Khaleda Zia, the former leader of the opposition, denied any involvement of her Bangladesh Nationalist Party and ally Jamaat-e-Islami in the post-poll attack on the minority Hindu people.
- According to Mizanur Rahman, the chairman of the National Human Rights Commission, the Bangladesh government failed to prevent the attacks on Hindus after the election.
- The Gonojagoron Mancha started the largest anti-communal Road March at 7:30 am on 10 January from Shahbagh in the capital to Jessore to visit the Hindus who were attacked, allegedly by Jamaat-Shibir men, at Malopara of Abhaynagar in the district. Another road march on 17 January towards Thakurgaon district of northern Bangladesh. The mancha also started street rallies at Jahangirnagar University at 10:00 am, Manikganj at 11:00 am, Modhukhali of Faridpur at 4:00 pm, and Magura at 5:00 pm on that day. Spokesperson Imran H Sarker told a press conference in its temporary tent in Shahbagh.
- Human rights organisation Ain O Salish Kendra issued a statement against the assaults. They called for quick alleviation and restoration for the individuals who were harmed. Marked by its executive director, Mohammad Nur Khan, the association's announcement said the affected individuals were leaving their homes because of the absence of security.
- Karmojibi Nari (working women), an NGO for women's rights, made a human chain to request security for the Hindu community in Bangladesh and penalty for the individuals or groups behind the attacks on the Hindu community.
- In Rangamati, the Sanatan Jubo Parishad and Puja Udjapon Committee requested the prompt capture and commendable discipline for the aggressors.
- In Sherpur, Bangladesh, the Garo Students Association made a human chain, requesting punishment for the individuals who assaulted the Hindu groups, and in addition, security to be guaranteed for all minorities.
- Bangladesh Islami Andolon chairman Syed Mohammad Rezaul Karim likewise communicated concern and bitterness regarding the assaults on the Hindu groups and individuals.
- Three hundred and fifty-one educators who are ideologically aligned with BNP and Jamaat at Rajshahi University censured the assaults on minority groups and requested a fair and free inquiry under the supervision of the United Nations.
- Dhaka University Teachers Association (DUTA) created a human chain, requesting quick action against those who have been killing individuals, assaulting minorities, and destroying religious establishments and government property.

=== International ===
In India, the opposition Bharatiya Janata Party expressed concerns over violence against Hindus in Bangladesh.

== Arrests ==
Seven persons have been arrested in connection with the attacks. The Bangladesh government has decided to set up special tribunals to punish the perpetrators of crimes against the minority communities, including the Hindus. The Law Ministry has consulted the Supreme Court to try the criminals under the Terrorism Prevention Act.

== List of temples attacked ==
Date	Temple	Place	Upazila	District	Division
8 January 2014	Kali temple	Battola	Kalmakanda Upazila	Netrakona District	Dhaka Division
8 January 2014	Kali temple	Kachubunia	Morrelganj Upazila	Bagerhat District	Khulna Division
8 January 2014	Radha Govinda temple	Kachubunia	Morrelganj Upazila	Bagerhat District	Khulna Division
9 January 2014	Kali temple	Narayanpur	Ramganj Upazila	Lakshmipur District	Chittagong Division
10 January 2014	Sri Sri Nengta Babar Ashram	Satdoha	Magura Sadar Upazila	Magura District	Khulna Division
12 January 2014	Durga temple	Ikri union	Bhandaria Upazila	Pirojpur District	Barisal Division

== See also ==
- 1971 Bangladesh genocide
  - Operation Searchlight
  - Chuknagar massacre
  - Razakar
- 2012 Chirirbandar violence
- 2012 Fatehpur violence
- 2012 Hathazari violence
- 2012 Ramu violence
- 2013 Bangladesh anti-Hindu violence
- Noakhali riots
- Persecution of indigenous peoples in Bangladesh
- Persecution of Hindus in Bangladesh
- Persecution of Buddhists in Bangladesh
- Persecution of Chakma Buddhists
- Persecution of Ahmadis in Bangladesh
- Persecution of Christians in Bangladesh
- Persecution of atheists and secularists in Bangladesh
- Freedom of religion in Bangladesh
- Human rights in Bangladesh
