= 2021 Bangladesh anti-Hindu violence =

Violence during the Durga Puja festival

- Location: Bangladesh
- Date: 13 – 19 October 2021
- Target: Hindus
- Attack type: Communal violence, religious violence, vandalism, civil disorder
- Deaths: 8+
- Injuries: 150+
- Perpetrator: Islamic extremists
- No. of participants: 4,000+
- Motive: Desecration of a Quran
- Convicted: 450

From 13 to 19 October 2021, Muslim mobs instigated communal violence against Hindu communities across Bangladesh during the Durga Puja festival, in response to a viral video where Quran was kept under a temple idol's feet. More than 50 temples and makeshift worship arrangements were vandalised all over Bangladesh.

The Government of Bangladesh deployed Border Guard Bangladesh forces in 22 out of 64 administrative districts of Bangladesh to quell violence against the Hindu community. Police arrested at least 450 people over the clashes and attacks. As of 20 October 2021, at least 8 people have been killed across the country, including 3 Hindus & 5 Muslims. On 24 October, One more Hindu man who was injured during the clash died while undergoing treatment in Dhaka.

== Background ==
Hindus make up 7.9% of Bangladesh's population.

Bangladesh's Hindu minority was preparing for the largest religious festival of the Hindu community in the second week of October 2021. Like every year, makeshift arrangements to offer worship were set up across the country. On the morning of 13 October, allegations of defaming the Quran emerged from a makeshift temple in Comilla district, when reports of a copy of the Quran being found on the lap of an idol circulated through the social media platforms. As an immediate reaction, the government urged people to calm down and instructed the police to investigate the incident. However, soon after the report was circulated, an angry mob started attacking local temples in Comilla. The religious tension soon spread to other districts of Bangladesh. A few days later, a Muslim man named Iqbal Hossain was arrested by police for placing the copy of the Quran on the lap of the idol at Nanua Dighir Par puja mandap in Comilla on 13 October.

=== Summary of dead, injured and attack on temples ===
By 22 October, at least 3 Hindus were reported killed, and at least over 150 others injured. At least 80 temples (200 mandapas) were damaged by mobs. At least 4,000 were charged and 400 detained by police.

== Attack on Hindu temples and minority communities ==
Reports of attacks on temples, houses, shops of minorities, looting of belongings, and murder were documented in at least a dozen districts of Bangladesh mostly in the southern area, including Comilla, Chandpur, Noakhali, Chittagong, Bandarban, Cox's Bazar, Narshingdi and Gazipur.

=== Comilla ===
The incident started in Comilla district where attacks were carried out on different temples from 13 October till 16 October. Durga Puja venue of Nanua Dighir Par and Chandmoni Kali temple became the target for the attackers soon after the rumor of demeaning Quran spread across the area. A septuagenarian Hindu man, Dilip Das, died in a hospital, succumbing to the injuries.

=== Chandpur ===
At least 4 people died in Chandpur when Police fired at an angry mob brought out a procession, and launched an attack on some Durga puja venue of the district, on 13 October.

Ariyan Sajjad, a member of Hajiganj municipality branch of Chhatra League, and Hridoy Hassan Zahid, the son of local Awami League leader Shahida Begum, advised local Muslims to launch an attack on temples and pandals of Hindus in protest of the "desecration of Quran" in Comilla. A mob was gathered after the posts and swooped on the Hindu temples and pandals after a short protest.

=== Bandarban ===
Under the leadership of a local Awami League leader, a temple and establishments owned by Hindus were attacked by an angry mob on 14 October in Lama area of Bandarban. The Lama central Hari Mandir was attacked from a rally of angry mob who were protesting against the "demeaning of Quran". They also attacked the shops of Hindu people in the Lama market area. Lama Upazila Awami League general secretary Zahirul Islam addressed the mob before they started attacking the temple according to the local police officials.

=== Noakhali ===
The body of a Hindu man was recovered from a pond adjacent to the temple on Saturday after an attack on Begumganj's Chaumuhani in Noakhali, Bangladesh, on Friday. After receiving the Qur'an in a puja mandapa in Comilla on Wednesday, six people were killed in attacks and violence on temples and puja mandals in different parts of the country including Comilla and Chandpur. Police said a puja mandapa in Begumganj in Noakhali district was attacked and set on fire and idols were vandalized inside another temple on Friday. Local Hindu community leaders claim that the man whose body was found in the pond was killed in yesterday's attack. Three others were seriously injured in the attack and are being treated at the hospital.

Police had earlier confirmed that one person was killed in yesterday's clash at Chaumuhani in Begumganj, Noakhali. But that morning, when another body floated in the pond adjacent to the ISKCON temple in Chaumuhani, the people of the temple recognized him. Chinmoy Krishnadas Brahmachari, divisional secretary of ISKCON Chittagong, says the body found was of Pranta Chandra Das. He was missing since the clashes. "We couldn't find the boy. We searched a lot at night, in the pond. Since the boy had already been killed with a blow, he had been severely beaten. His body was found in the morning. Police and fire service came and rescued him," said Mr. Das. After the body was found, people of the Hindu community took to the streets to protest.

=== Gazipur ===
Babul Rudra, president of the management committee of Palpara Sri Sri Radha Govinda Mandir in Kashimpur Bazar and president of the Kashimpur Puja Celebration Committee, said that when worshipers were worshiping at the temple after 8 am on Thursday, suddenly 'hundreds of people' attacked Lakshmi with sticks. The idol of Asura was vandalized and left.This caused panic in the area. Earlier, around 6am, 'more than three hundred people' attacked the family temple of Subal Das, a businessman from Kashimpur Paschimpara area, and the local Palpara Namabazar public temple, Deputy Commissioner of Police Zakir Hasan.

=== Chittagong ===
After the Friday prayers on Friday (15 October), people came out of the Andarkilla Shahi Jame Mosque and tried to break through the gate of the adjoining JMSen Hall. The puja committee also alleged that the banner was torn down and stones were thrown at the idol. Witnesses said some worshipers gathered at the Andarkilla Shahi Jame Mosque gate after Friday prayers to protest the Comilla incident. From there they marched towards JMsen Hall. Although there was a traffic police cordon at the corner, they broke it and proceeded. They tried to break through the gate as the main gate of JMSen Hall premises was already closed. At this time, they threw stones inside and tore down various banners hung on the road and surrounding walls for worship. In the puja mandapa of JMsen Hall, women of different ages were preparing to bid farewell to the goddess with drink, oil and vermilion. When the commotion started outside, there was panic among them. The police members of the police dispersed the tear shell and dispersed the attackers. The attackers fled at this time. Ashish Bhattacharya, president of the Chittagong Metropolitan Worship Celebration Council, told reporters, 'Every year the work of immersion starts from 11 am. This time the government had instructed to leave the puja mandapa for prayers after half past two in the afternoon. That is why we were waiting in the mandapa to perform religious rituals. We were attacked here just in time.

A group of zealots from a procession brought out in the Andarkilla area started throwing brickbats targeting the J M Sen Hall Puja Mandap. Witnesses said as the group threw brickbats at the temple housing the mandap and tried to vandalize it, police chased them away leading to a clash between the law enforcers and the zealots. Police fired shots in the air and lobbed tear gas canisters to disperse the attackers, who had brought out the procession after Jum'ah prayer. Police said they detained around 50 protestors from the spot.

=== Cox's Bazar ===
On Wednesday (13 October) evening, a group of extremist miscreants along with a procession attacked and vandalized the puja mandapa of Biswas Para in Sadar Union of Pekua Upazila with provocative slogans. After receiving the news, the police reached the spot and chased the attackers. The police fired blank shots to bring the situation under control. At one point, the attackers vandalized several houses in the surrounding Hindu community as they fled. After this incident, extremists took out different processions in different areas of Pekua at night. From these processions, puja mandals and houses of Hindus in different areas including Kachari Mura Shil Para and Magnamar Shil Para of Shilkhali were vandalized and set on fire. According to the District Worship Celebration Council, extremists have vandalized six pavilions, vandalized 30 houses and set fire to one house in Pekua.

=== Moulvibazar ===
Shyamal Chandra Das, general secretary of Kamalganj Upazila Puja Celebration Committee, said a group of people attacked the Muidibazar Moidail Puja mandapa between 8:30 pm and 10:30 pm on Wednesday night and vandalized the idol. Besides, arches and electric lights of Basudebpur Puja Mandap, Akhra Puja Mandap of Vrindavanpur Jagannath Jio of Patanushar Union and Bairagir Chowk Public Puja Mandap were vandalized, he said, Munshibazar Union Parishad members, Sunil Malakar and Rezaul Karim Noman said the gates of Rampur Public Puja Mandap and Narayankhet Shabdakar Academy Puja Mandap were also vandalized. Kamalganj Upazila Parishad Vice Chairman Rambhajan Kairi confirmed the incident of vandalism against the idol at Kamarchhara Tea Garden Pujamandap. Moulvibazar District Puja Celebration Parishad leader Jahar Tarafdar said six temples in Kamalganj and two other religious institutions in Kulaura were attacked. "In Kamalganj, by placing pots in separate places in one of the two broken temples, only the ninth puja of the goddess will be performed. However, the situation in the district is calm at the moment." Kamalganj Upazila Nirbahi Officer Ashekul Haque said, "We are inspecting all the places. The situation is under control. The BGB has been deployed since Thursday morning to provide security to the puja mandapa. At the same time, a large number of police have been deployed to conduct the puja peacefully."

=== Feni ===
A clash broke out on 16 October in Feni between the local Hindu community and Muslims when a group of Hindu dwellers of the district was protesting the nationwide attack on Hindu community during the Durga Puja festival. The clash left around a dozen of people from both communities injured.

=== Kishoreganj ===
Idols at a Kali temple in Karimganj upazila of Kishoreganj District were vandalized on 15 October.

=== Rangpur ===
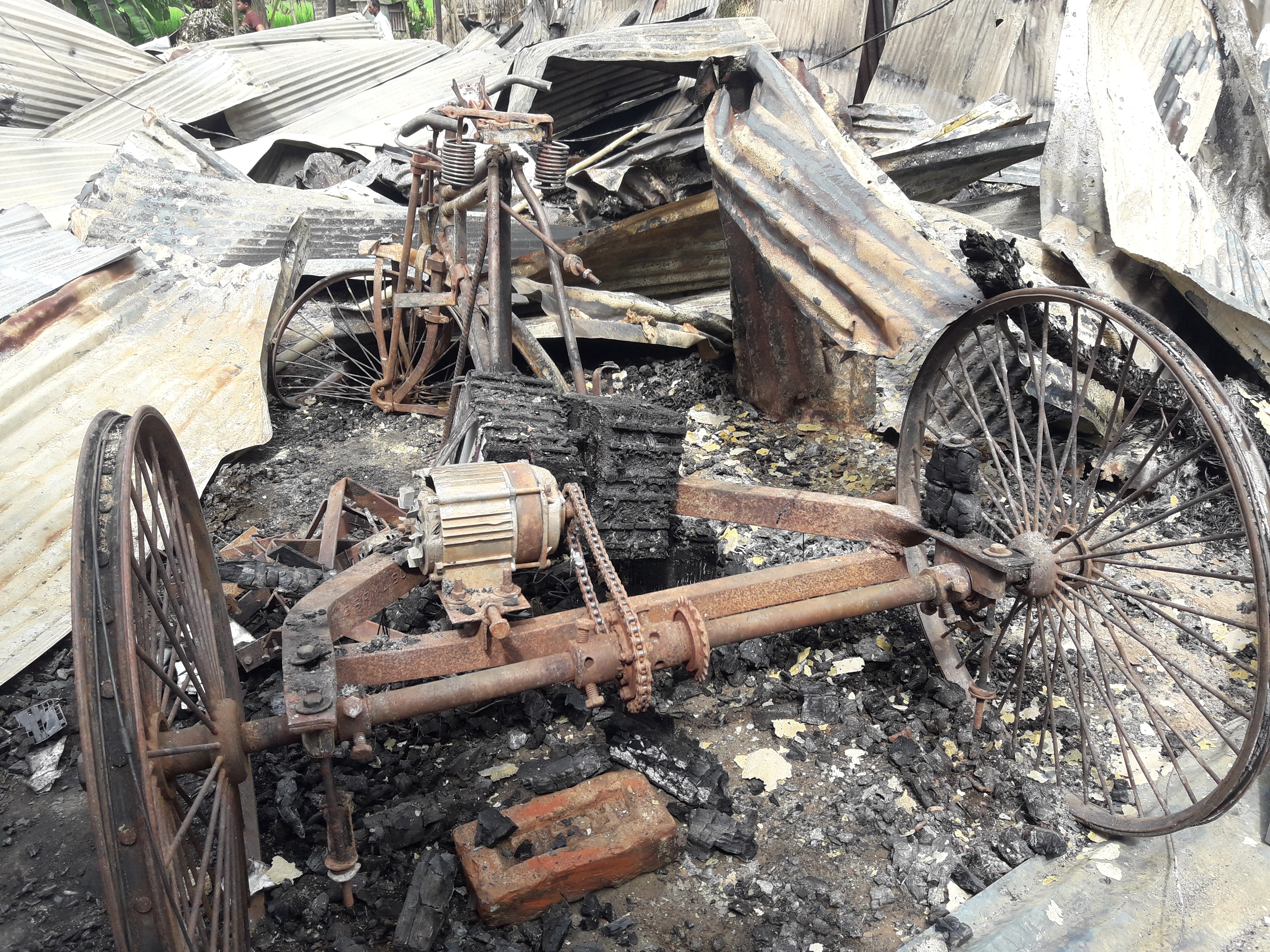
property damage to by communal violence in Pirganj

A group of mob set fire to around a dozen Hindu-owned houses in Rangpur's Pirganj Upazila on 17 October after an alleged post by a local Hindu boy on Kaaba went viral. Local Bangladesh Chhatra League leaders instigated the mob alleging that the post demeaned the holy place vandalized the houses, set fire, and obstructed fire-fighters from dousing the fire.

It was later revealed that, Saikat Mandal, the vice-president of philosophy department Chhatra League at Rangpur's Carmichael College, had personal conflicts with a local Hindu, who is identified as Paritosh Sarkar. During the nationwide communal violence, Saikat and his followers in Bangladesh Chhatra League collaborated with the imam of a local mosque to instigate the local Muslim population to conduct the attack on Hindu villages of the area.

== Government response ==
On 17 October, Bangladesh Police filed cases against over 4,000 suspects involved in the violence. However, on 30 January 2022, the Supreme Court of Bangladesh stayed judicial inquiry ordered by the High Court of Bangladesh into the communal attacks on the Hindu Community that took place in October 2021 during the Durga Puja Festival. In addition, the High Court bench, led by Judge JBM Hasan, was ordered to dispose of a petition related to attacks on communities in six districts. The appealing body of six judges, led by Judge Hasan Fayez Siddiqui, has passed the order. Subrata Chowdhury, counsel for the writ petitioner, objected to the stay order, saying, "The local administration has failed to protect Hindus and their properties and places of worship from communal attacks during last year's Durga Puja."

== Reaction ==
On 16 October 2021, after Friday prayers, a crowd of over 10,000 Muslims from various Mosques in Dhaka took to streets, carrying banners of Islamist political parties and chanting, "down with the enemies of the Islam" and "hang the culprits". On the same day, nearby nearly 1,000 Hindus also protested against the attacks on temples and the killing of Hindus by Muslim mobs.

Minister of Home Affairs Asaduzzaman Khan stated that the incidents were pre-planned: "It appears to us that it was a motivated act instigated by a vested group ... Not only in Comilla, but attempts were also made to destabilize the country previously through communal violence in Ramu and Nasirnagar."

Minister of Foreign Affairs of Bangladesh AK Abdul Momen issued a clarification regarding the communal violence stating 6 people were killed, 4 were Muslim and 2 Hindus were killed of which one died of natural causes and the other died after jumping in a pond. He claimed "not a single temple was destroyed" during the violence but "deities or goddesses were vandalized". He stated the government was "committed to religious harmony" and advised people not to believe "ongoing propaganda" regarding the attacks from "enthusiastic media" seeking to "embarrass" the government. Dr Momen also stated the government had rebuilt Hindu homes and had provided generous compensation to all those affected by the violence. He also noted that there was a record number of Puja Mondops in Bangladesh, partly because of government-funded subsidies.

Mirza Fakhrul Islam Alamgir, secretary general of Bangladesh Nationalist Party condemned the violence against "Hindu brothers", and alleged a government conspiracy behind the attacks. He called for a non-partisan government to take power before the next elections.

Bangladesh Hindu Buddhist Christian Unity Council observed a half-day strike in Chattagram in protest of the attacks on Durga Puja venue in Chattagram. The General Secretary of the organization in an interview claimed that a majority of local Awami League leaders were complicit or actively aiding in the violence. He called for the "self-purification" of Awami League to prevent future attacks on minority community.

On 22 October 2021, a demonstration was done in Kathmandu, Nepal to express solidarity for the victims and demanding punishment to the perpetrators.

Prime Minister of India Narendra Modi was heavily criticized by regional parties for his silence over the matter. In the neighbouring Indian state of Tripura, home to a large number of Hindus whose ancestors fled present-day Bangladesh, communal violence against local Muslims erupted during Vishwa Hindu Parishad rallies against the Durga Puja violence.

== Legacy ==
Bangladesh lags behind on religious harmony. According to a report from the Bangladesh Jatiya Hindu Mohajote, in 2017 alone, at least 25 Hindu girls and children were raped with 235 temples and idols left vandalized. The total number of atrocities against the Hindu community in the year was 6,474.

Earlier the same year, anti-Modi protests in Bangladesh quickly turned into anti-Hindu riots with the vandalization of several Hindu temples. With the constant attacks against the Hindu community in Bangladesh, analysts believe that by 2050 "no Hindu will be left in Bangladesh".

== See also ==
- Persecution of Hindus
- Anti-Hindu sentiment
- Freedom of religion in Bangladesh
- Human rights and persecution of non-Muslims in Bangladesh
