= 1990 Bangladesh anti-Hindu violence =

In 1990, a series of attacks against the Bengali Hindus in Bangladesh occurred in late October and early November, following a rumour that the Babri mosque in Ayodhya in India had been demolished. The attacks on the Hindus began on 30 October and continued till 2 November.

== Background ==
In 1988, President Hussain Muhammad Ershad, had amended the Constitution of Bangladesh to declare Islam as the state religion of Bangladesh. In the fall of 1989, an anti-Hindu pogrom took place in Bangladesh, marked by widespread destruction of Hindu temples and violence against the Hindus, following the laying of foundation of Ram temple in faraway Ayodhya in Uttar Pradesh, India. The relations between the majority Muslims and minority Hindus remained tense and as the events unfolded in Ayodhya.

== Babri Mosque conflict ==
On 29 October, the Jamaat-e-Islami-funded newspaper The Daily Inqilab ran a top story "Babri mosque destroyed". Tensions began to mount in the country after the publication of the rumour that Babri mosque had been demolished.

=== Dhaka ===
In Old Dhaka, Muslim protesters attempted to set fire to Hindu temples which was foiled by the police. The demonstrators, however, seized the cameras of the newsmen outside the temple. The administrator imposed curfew in parts of Dhaka following the incident. On 30 October, while President Hussain Muhammad Ershad was addressing a youth conference in Bangabhavan, Islamist mobs attacked the Gouri Math and set fire to Hindu-owned shops just to the south of Bangabhavan. On 31 October, about 1,000 Muslims allegedly marched to the Indian embassy in Dhaka. The curfew was extended to the entire city.

In Lalbagh, the Dhakeshwari Temple and other buildings with the temple complex were looted, vandalised and set on fire. The residence of the priest and ten other Hindu families were looted, vandalised and set on fire. The priest saved his life by jumping over the wall of the temple complex. The arson continued for four hours. The Durga temple at Lalbagh Road, the Girigovardhan Jiu temple at Pushparaj Saha Lane, Raghunath Jiu akhara at Haranath Ghosh Lane and the Kamrangirchar crematorium at Lalbagh was looted and vandalised. More than 50 Hindu houses and shops were looted at vandalised at Lalbagh Road and Haranath Ghosh Road.

In Hazaribagh, three Hindu temples in Bhagalpur Lane were attacked, looted and vandalised. The images were broken. 17 Hindus were stabbed at Nagar Beltoli Lane. In Nagar Beltoli and Hazaribagh around 100 Hindu houses and shops and about a dozen Hindu temples were looted vandalised and set on fire. In Sutrapur, fourteen Hindu temples, akharas and mutts were attacked, looted, vandalised and set on fire. More than 100 Hindu shops and houses were looted and vandalised. In most cases they were set on fire.

=== Chittagong ===
Tension also began to mount in Chittagong, the second largest city of Bangladesh with a 30% Hindu population. On the evening of 30 October, trouble erupted in the city. Muslim mobs took to the streets in protest of the alleged demolition of the Babri mosque in Ayodhya. The police fired in the air to disperse the crowd and imposed indefinite curfew in Chittagong. After the midnight past 30 October, a 2,000 strong Islamist mob armed with knives and iron rods rampaged through the residential area surrounding the Kaibalyadham temple and set fire to more than 300 Hindu homes. When the fire fighters arrived, the mob prevented them from entering the area. During the midnight attacks, around 1,500 Hindu fishermen of Chowkbazar fled their homes. A 200 strong mob tried to destroy temples and burn Hindu-owned shops in Reazuddin Bazar and Chittagong Medical College. 50 thatched huts of Hindu fishermen were destroyed. A Hindu-owned garage was attacked and five vehicles were damaged. On the dawn of 31 October, a group of 100 Islamists broke the curfew and desecrated a Hindu shrine. On 2 November, the curfew was relaxed for a few hours to allow for the Friday prayers. A 500 strong Islamist mob, armed with knives and home made bombs attacked a Hindu village in the outskirts of Chittagong. Around 100 Hindus were injured in separate incidents of violence in Patharganj, Boalkhali, Anwara and Hathazari.

=== Other places ===
Anti-Hindu violence was reported from Dhaka and 12 other cities of Bangladesh. The Daily Ittefaq reported incidents of anti-Hindu violence from Jessore, Narail, Gaibandha, Mymensingh, Sunamganj and Sylhet.

== Aftermath ==
The Hindus displaced during the attacks on Pahartali in Chittagong, set up a refugee camp on a hill above the Kaibalyadham temple, where around 500 Hindus took shelter.

== See also ==
- Operation Searchlight
- Chuknagar massacre
- Jathibhanga massacre
- Shankharipara massacre
- Freedom of religion in Bangladesh
- Human rights in Bangladesh
