= 2012 Chirirbandar violence =

2012 Chirirbandar violence refers to the attack on the minority Hindu community by Islamic extremists in Chirirbandar Upazila of Dinajpur District in the Division of Rangpur, Bangladesh on 4 August 2012.

== Background ==
There was a temporary mosque in the Balaibajar locality of the Rajapur village under Amarpur union council of Chirirbandar Upazila . The owner of the land was Professor Hamida Khatun of Chittagong Metropolitan College. She wanted to make the mosque permanent. The foundation stone of the mosque was laid one week before the incident. But there was an old Kali Temple about 200 yards distant from the mosque. Rajapur village is a completely Hindu dominated village. There is no Muslim in the locality. So the Hindus requested Professor Hamida Khatun to build the Mosque 500 yards away. But she denied and with the help of the Chirirbandar Upazila Parishad chairman and a Bangladesh Jamaat-e-Islami leader Aftab Ali Molla gave inflammatory speech to agitate the local Muslims.

== Attacks ==
The violence is said to have brewed on Saturday 4 August 2012, in spite of Section 144 being imposed there.

== Aftermath ==
The incident triggered panic among the members of the Hindu community in the locality.

The Awami League put the incident down to the upazila administration's lack of prompt action and BNP and Bangladesh Jamaat-e-Islami's provocation. BNP, however, pointed the finger at the ruling party lawmaker's failure to act responsibly.

Over 50 important Bangladeshi intellectuals like Shahriar Kabir and Syed Shamsul Haque have condemned the violence.

== See also ==
- Operation Searchlight
- Chuknagar massacre
- Shankharipara massacre
- Razakar
- 2012 Ramu violence
- Persecution of indigenous peoples in Bangladesh
- Persecution of Buddhists in Bangladesh
- Persecution of Chakma Buddhists
- Persecution of Ahmadis in Bangladesh
- Persecution of Christians in Bangladesh
- Persecution of atheists and secularists in Bangladesh
- Freedom of religion in Bangladesh
- Human rights in Bangladesh
