= 2015 Rajshahi mosque bombing =

Suicide attack in Bangladesh in 2015

- Location Rajshahi District in Bangladesh
- Location: Bagmara Upazila, Rajshahi District, Bangladesh
- Date: 25 December 2015
- Target: Ahmadiyya mosque
- Attack type: Suicide bombing
- Deaths: 1 (the perpetrator)
- Injuries: 3 - 10+
- Perpetrator: Islamic State of Iraq and the Levant (Probably)

The 2015 Rajshahi mosque bombing was a suicide attack which occurred on 25 December 2015 during Friday Prayers at an Ahmadi Muslim mosque in Mochmoli village, in Bagmara Upazila, in Rajshahi District, Bangladesh. The attack targeted around 70 Ahmadi Muslim worshippers during Friday prayers, resulting in the death of the perpetrator and injuring between three and ten people.

The perpetrator, identified as a 20-year-old student and identified himself came from Mohonpur Upazila and attending the Rajshahi Polytechnic Institute. Islamic State of Iraq and the Levant (ISIL) claimed the responsibility for the bombing. Eventough, polices atributed the attack to Jamaat-ul-Mujahideen Bangladesh (JMB), while local suspected member of Ahle Hadith Andolon Bangladesh

== Incident ==
On December 25, 2015, a suicide attack happened during Friday prayers at an Ahmadiyya's mosque in Mochmoli village, located in the Bagmara Upazila, Rajshahi. An estimated 70 Ahmadi Muslim worshippers were inside the mosque during the Friday congregation prayers. The perpetrator, who was wearing jeans, a t-shirt, and a jacket, detonated the bomb around 1:35 p.m. He was praying in second row and was asked to fill the first row and detonated at second rak'a of the prayer. His age was around 20 years old and identified himself as a student at Rajshahi Polytechnic Institute and came from Mohonpur upazila.

One person, the perpetrator, was killed, and between three and ten people were injured in the attack. The victim is admitted to Rajshahi Medical College Hospital.

== Responsibility ==
The Islamic State of Iraq and the Levant has claimed responsibility for the attack. However, locals have stated that members of Ahle Hadith Andolon Bangladesh, which runs a neighbouring mosque, may be responsible for the attack. On the other hand, local police have blamed Jamaat-ul-Mujahideen Bangladesh (JMB) for recent rise in violence, including the attack at the Ahmadiyya mosque.

On 7 June 2016, the police killed Jamal Uddin during a gunfight, a person who confessed to being one of two people who accompanied the bomber and also a member of JMB.
