= Human rights in Bangladesh =

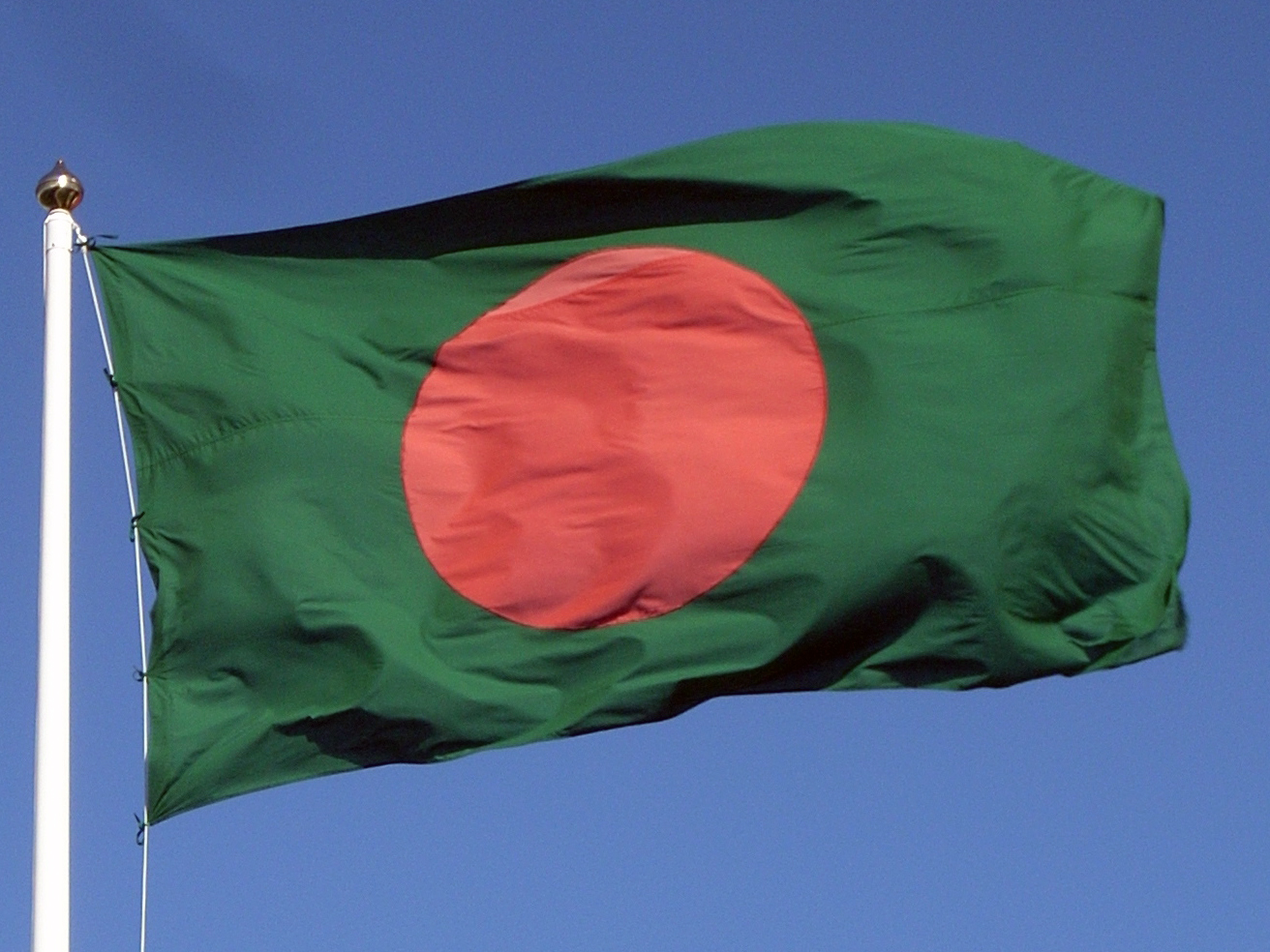
Flag of Bangladesh

Human rights in Bangladesh are enshrined as fundamental rights in Part III of the Constitution of Bangladesh. However, constitutional and legal experts believe many of the country's laws require reform to enforce fundamental rights and reflect democratic values of the 21st century.

During the period from 2009 to 2023 under the rule of the Awami League-led regime, 2,699 people were victims of extrajudicial killings in Bangladesh. During the same time frame, 677 people were forcibly disappeared, and 1,048 people died in custody. These statistics were revealed by the human rights organization Odhikar. Additionally, the organization claims that if the deaths from the anti-discrimination student protests and incidents from 2024 are included, the total death toll would exceed 3,000.

In 2024, Freedom House rated Bangladesh's human rights at 40 out 100 (partly free).

== Overview ==
Reforms were proposed in 2017 and included strengthening parliamentary supremacy, judicial independence, the separation of powers, repealing laws which restrain freedom of the press and disbanding security agencies which violate civil liberties.

Even though Bangladesh has Islam as its state religion and has constitutional references to Hindus, Christians and Buddhists; the political system is modeled as a secular democracy. Governments have generally respected freedom of religion, a cornerstone of the Bangladeshi constitution. However, the police have been slow in responding to and investigating attacks against minorities, opposition activists & supporters and purportedly suppress protests against the government. According to Human Right Watch, around five hundred people have been disappeared during the last ten years. In southeastern Bangladesh, the Chittagong Hill Tracts remains a militarized region due to historical insurgency. Tribal people in Bangladesh have demanded constitutional recognition.

According to Dr. Mizanur Rahman, the former chairman of the National Human Rights Commission, 70% of allegations of human rights violations are against law enforcement agencies (2015). Torture and enforced disappearances are rampantly employed by Bangladeshi security forces. In recent years, free speech and media freedom have been repressed by the government through laws regulating newspapers, TV channels and the internet. Elected MPs in parliament lack voting freedoms. The future of elections is a concern among the population, with opposition parties alleging free and fair elections are not possible under the incumbent government. Local government elections in 2015 were marred by widespread allegations of vote rigging. Bangladesh continues to make strides in its pursuit of labor rights, although the journey is still ongoing. The presence of active trade unions, a decline in the number of child laborers, and the establishment of labor courts and foundations exemplify the remarkable progress Bangladesh has made in safeguarding labor rights.

Capital punishment remains legal in Bangladesh. Worker's rights are effected by a ban on trade unions in special economic zones. The government has often targeted trade union leaders with persecution. The right to enjoy their own culture, to profess and practice and practise their own religion, and to use their own language in both private and publics spheres (Article 2 (1)).

In 2025, Human Rights Watch reported that Bangladesh’s interim administration had made limited progress on its human rights agenda. While incidents of enforced disappearances and widespread fear had declined since the previous regime, concerns persisted over arbitrary detentions, politically motivated actions, and the lack of systemic reform. The interim government continued to face pressure from international bodies and civil society to address past abuses, ensure accountability, and implement long-overdue legal reforms to protect fundamental rights and democratic governance.

== Citizenship and minority rights ==
=== Non-Bengalis ===
Non-Bengali minorities are often culturally and politically discriminated in the country. Article 23A of the constitution goes on to describe minorities as "tribes" and "minor races", notably the Chakmas, Biharis, Garos, Santhals, Marmas, Manipuris, Tripuris, Tanchangyas, Bawms. Article 6 of the constitution, which proclaims "the people of Bangladesh shall be known as Bangalees as a nation", was criticized for discrimination against the country's significant non-Bengali population. Chakma politician Manabendra Narayan Larma addressed it during proceedings of the constituent assembly of Bangladesh in 1972, famously proclaimed that "Under no definition or logic can a Chakma be a Bengali or a Bengali be a Chakma....As citizens of Bangladesh, we are all Bangladeshis, but we also have a separate ethnic identity, which unfortunately the Awami League leaders do not want to understand".

=== Refugees ===
The substantial Bihari population still faces discrimination. In 2008, the Dhaka High Court granted citizenship to the stateless Stranded Pakistani community.

Bangladesh has been criticized for the poor living conditions in which over Rohingya refugees from Myanmar are kept in the country's southeast. There was international outcry after the army and government planned to relocate refugee camps to a remote island in the Bay of Bengal. There were an estimated 22,000 registered refugees and over 100,000 unregistered refugees until 2016. Following the 2016-present Rakhine State crackdown, 1.5 million refugees entered Bangladesh from Myanmar.

Bangladesh has not signed the 1951 Convention Relating to the Status of Refugees.

=== Persecution of non-Muslims ===
List of massacres targeted at religious minorities, mainly by radical Islamists against the Hindu, Buddhist and Christian population of Bangladesh:

- 1946 Noakhali riots
- 1971 Bangladesh genocide of Hindus and Buddhist
- 1989 Bangladesh pogroms
- 1990 Bangladesh anti-Hindu violence
- 1992 Bangladesh violence
- 2012 Chirirbandar violence
- 2012 Fatehpur violence
- 2012 Hathazari violence
- 2012 Ramu violence
- 2013 Bangladesh anti-Hindu violence
- 2014 Bangladesh anti-Hindu violence
- 2016 Nasirnagar Violence
- 2021 Bangladesh anti-Hindu violence
- Persecution of Hindus in Bangladesh
- Persecution of Buddhists in Bangladesh
- Persecution of Christians in Bangladesh
- Persecution of atheists and secularists in Bangladesh

=== Persecution of minority Muslims ===
Different denominational minority Muslim groups are often targeted by the dominant Sunnis for sectarian violence, such as Ahmadiyya and Shia community of the country. In 2004, the Government of Bangladesh banned all religious texts of the Ahmadiyya community. In 2015, a Shi'ite Ashura gathering was bombed.

== Labour rights ==
The constitution's proclamation of a People's republic and socialism in its preamble and Article 10 are at odds with Bangladesh's current free market economy system, entrepreneurial class, diverse corporate sector and owners of private property. Six general elections were won by pro-market political parties, while four elections were won by left-wing parties.

Bangladesh ranked 128th out of 178 countries in the 2017 Index of Economic Freedom.

In spite of Article 38 calling for freedom of association, trade union leaders from the textile industry often face arbitrary arrests and politically motivated lawsuits. Forming trade unions is banned in export processing zones (EPZs), but the government has pledged to remove the ban.

=== Forced labour ===
Forced labor is prohibited under Article 34. Child labour is common in the country, with 4.7 million children aged from 5 to 14 years old in the work force. 93% of child labourers are employed in the informal sector such as small factories and workshops, on the street, in home-based businesses and domestic employment. In 2006, Bangladesh passed a Labor Law setting the minimum legal age for employment as 14.

== Freedom of speech ==
Free speech is enshrined under Article 39. During the 1990s and first decade and a half of the 21st century, the Bangladeshi media enjoyed more freedom than at any other time in history. However, after the 2014 election in which the incumbent Awami League won a boycotted election, the freedom of the press had dramatically declined. The ruling party had targeted the country's two leading newspapers The Daily Star and Prothom Alo with numerous lawsuits and has encouraged businesses to stop advertising in them. Pro-opposition journalists Mahmudur Rahman and Shafik Rehman were detained for prolonged periods. Nurul Kabir, editor of the New Age, had to face threats to his life. Mahfuz Anam, editor of The Daily Star, had to face 83 lawsuits since 2016. Reporters without Borders ranked Bangladesh at 146th out of 180 countries in its index of press freedom.

According to Amnesty International, independent media outlets and journalists were under severe pressure by the government. Several journalists faced arbitrary criminal charges, often for publishing criticism of the former Prime Minister Sheikh Hasina, her family or the Awami League Government. Journalists reported increased threats from governmental officials and security agencies. The government continued to use a range of repressive laws to restrict the right to freedom of expression extensively. It increasingly used the Information and Communications Technology Act which arbitrarily restricted online expression. The human rights organization Odhikar reported increased arrests under the Act. Journalists, activists, and others were targeted. Dilip Roy, a student activist, was detained for criticizing the Prime Minister on Facebook, but later released on bail. Parliament adopted the Foreign Donations (Voluntary Activities) Regulation Act which significantly increased government control over the work of NGOs and threatened them with deregistration for making "inimical" or "derogatory" remarks against the Constitution or constitutional bodies. Several other bills that threatened freedom of expression were proposed in parliament, including the Digital Security Act and the Liberation War Denial Crimes Act.

The government was slow to investigate attacks on secularists in Bangladesh.

On 20 June 2020, a 15-year-old child was arrested by Bangladeshi authority for criticizing Prime Minister Sheikh Hasina Wazed in a Facebook post. The child was arrested under Digital Security Act. He was sent to a juvenile detention center. Human Rights Watch urged the Bangladeshi government to order their police force not to arrest people for criticizing the government and release all children held in juvenile detention facilities and prisons for petty crimes. According to Human Rights Watch, Bangladeshi authorities are perpetually detaining journalist, activist and government's critics under misuse of Digital Security Act. People are being detained for posting social media comments against the ruling party. HRW urged the authority to release detainees who were held under DSA for criticizing the government.

On February 13, 2025, noted poet, essayist, academic, literary editor and cultural activist Sohel Hasan Galib was arrested on charges of hurting religious sentiments on social media and in his poetry book. Pen Bangladesh condemned the arrest of the poet, saying that "opinions and ideas can only be countered by opinions and ideas, and not by stifling thought."

Article 11 proclaims that "the Republic shall be a democracy in which fundamental human rights and freedoms and respect for the dignity and worth of the human person shall be guaranteed". In 2017, the police asked the prime minister to scrap the anti-torture law.

Although there is general freedom of assembly in Bangladesh, the political opposition is often restricted from holding public meetings and rallies by the government.

On 3 January 2019, Human Rights Watch called for an investigation on attack on members of the opposition party on and before Bangladesh elections.

== Democracy ==
=== Elections ===
In 2011, the Awami League-led parliament abolished the caretaker government of Bangladesh, which was intended to act as a neutral guarantor during general elections. The opposition, Bangladesh Nationalist Party maintains that free and fair elections are not possible under the incumbent Awami League government, particularly after the League amended the constitution to have a sitting parliament while elections take place, in contradiction of Westminster norms.

In 2015, local government elections were marred by allegations of vote rigging and intimidation of voters and the media. Opposition parties have demanded a neutral interim government during the election period. In response, the government has proposed to restrict its political activities while organizing and holding elections.

=== Free votes ===
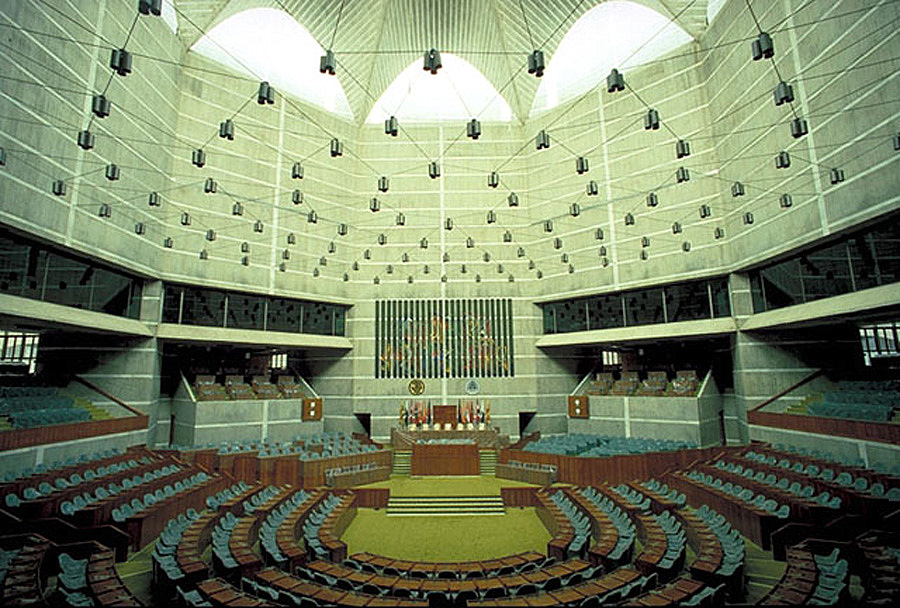
Parliament is not allowed to have free votes due to Article 70.

Article 70 of the Constitution of Bangladesh is described as one of the most significant constraints on Bangladesh's democracy. The article restricts free votes in parliament. This means MPs have no voting freedom. According to the article, MPs will lose their seats if they vote against their party. Critics have argued the article tramples free speech in parliament itself. As a result, parliament has been termed a rubber stamp and a lame duck.

=== Emergency powers ===
Part IXA of the constitution concerns a state of emergency. Emergency powers were increased in the second amendment. Three emergency periods have been declared in Bangladesh's history, including in 1973, 1990 and 2007. Article 141 (B) and Article 141 (C) allows for the suspension of fundamental rights during an emergency period. The articles have been strongly criticized. In January 2007, when the 2006-2008 Bangladeshi political crisis saw a declaration of emergency rule, the New Age stated in an editorial "...by declaring a state of emergency to undo his mistakes, it is once again the people that the president is hurting by suspending their fundamental democratic rights. The citizens are not at fault for the existing political situation and therefore should not be punished for the failures of the caretaker government and the political parties. The president, therefore, should immediately restore the fundamental rights of the citizens."

== Law and justice ==
=== Extrajudicial killings ===
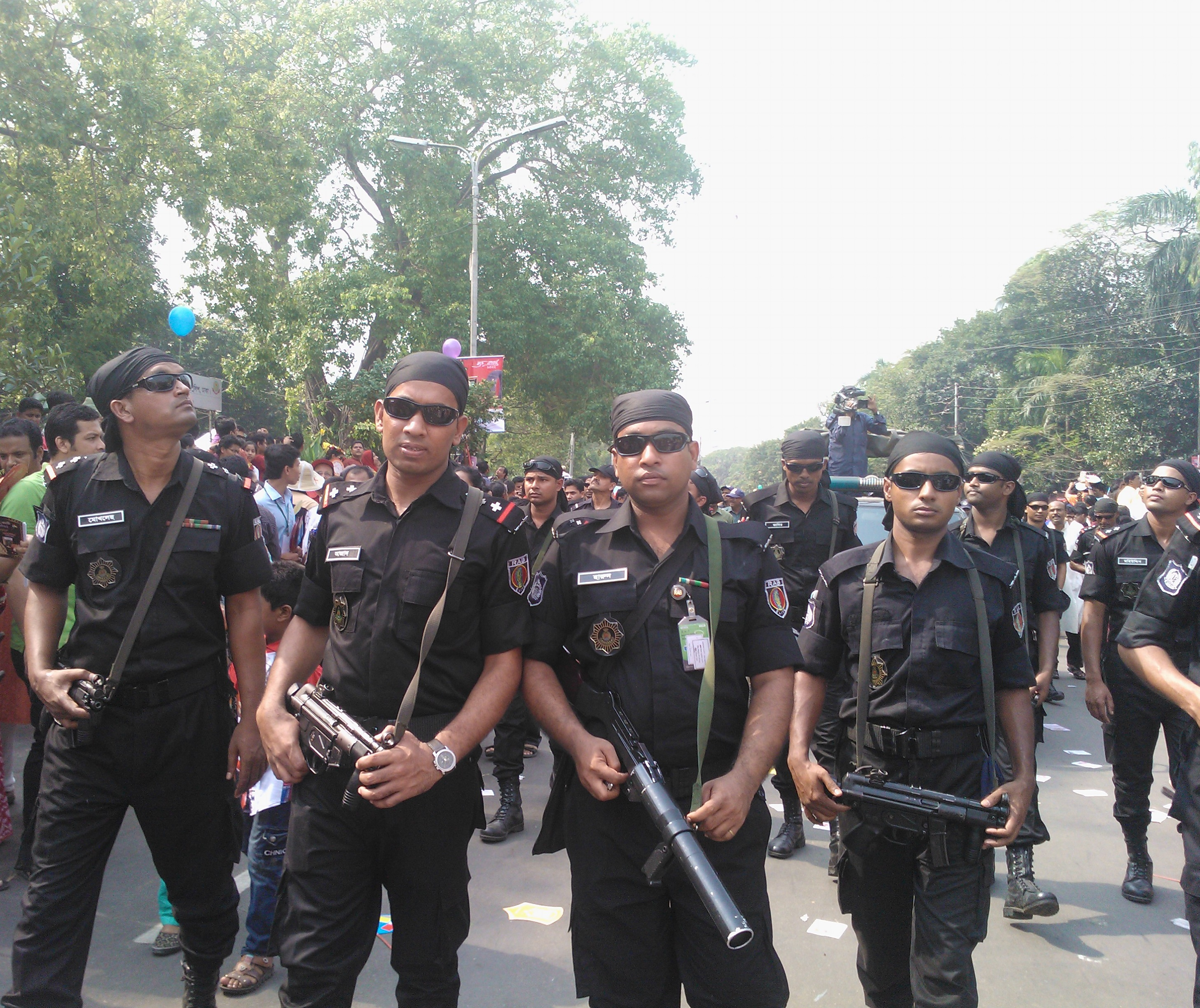
Members of the Rapid Action Battalion

Article 32 of the Constitution proclaims "no person shall be deprived of life or personal liberty save in accordance with law". In reality, Bangladesh has a number of extrajudicial killings and enforced disappearances each year. The Rapid Action Battalion is accused of being the leading perpetrator of such human rights abuses, followed by the Bangladesh Police, the Directorate General of Forces Intelligence and National Security Intelligence.

=== Capital punishment ===
Capital punishment remains legal in Bangladesh. There were four executions in the country in 2022, and four in 2021. It can theoretically be applied to anyone over the age of 16, but in practice is not applied to those under 18.

The death penalty may be used as a punishment for crimes such as murder, sedition, offences related to possession of or trafficking in drugs, offences related to trafficking in human beings, treason, espionage, military crimes, rape, hijacking planes, sabotage, or terrorism. It is carried out by hanging and firing squad; authorities usually use only hanging.

Bangladesh is not a state party to the Second Optional Protocol to the International Covenant on Civil and Political Rights on abolishing the death penalty.

Bangladesh's former Law Minister Anisul Huq proposed a law on behalf of the government under which the highest form of punishment would be imposed on those accused of rape. The decision followed public outrage over the video of a woman circulated online showing a group of men sexually assaulting her. It was later found that the girl was also repeatedly gang raped by the same men.

== Women's rights ==
The United Nations country team in Bangladesh has identified "marital instability" as the key cause of poverty and "ultra and extreme" poverty among female-headed households. The Bangladesh Planning Commission has said that women are more susceptible to becoming poor after losing a male earning family member due to abandonment or divorce. Women in Bangladesh are especially vulnerable to a form of domestic violence known as acid throwing, in which concentrated acid is thrown onto an individual (usually at the face) with the aims of extreme disfiguration and social isolation. In Bangladesh, women are discriminately targeted: according to one study, from 1999 to 2009, 68% of acid attack survivors were women/girls.

In 2010, a law against domestic violence was introduced, which defines causing "economic loss" as an act of domestic violence and recognises the right to live in the marital home. The law also empowers courts to provide temporary maintenance to survivors of domestic violence. In 2012, the Law Commission of Bangladesh, supported by the Ministry of Law, Justice and Parliamentary Affairs, completed nationwide research into reforms for Muslim, Hindu, and Christian personal laws. In May 2012, the cabinet approved a bill for optional registration of Hindu marriages. The Ministry of Law, Justice and Parliamentary Affairs is also considering reforms to civil court procedures—especially on issuance of summons that will improve family court efficiency.

Bangladesh has a high rate of early marriages. The government had vowed to end marriage of children younger than 15 by 2021. But in February 2017, a law was passed that permits girls less than 18 years of age to marry under "special circumstances," such as "accidental" or "illegal pregnancy," with permission from their parents and court.

== LGBT rights ==
In 2014, the Bangladeshi government officially recognized hijras as a third gender.

The British Raj-era Penal Code remains in force in Bangladesh. Section 377 of the Code criminalizes homosexuality. In 2016, Terrorist groups claimed responsibility for the murder of Bangladesh's first LGBTQ magazine editor Xulhaz Mannan and his partner Tanay Majumdar.

== Corruption ==
In 2017, Bangladesh scored a 28 out of 100 (0 being highly corrupt and 100 being clean), in the "Corruption Perceptions Index" by Transparency International, and ranked the 143rd most corrupt out of 180 nations. In 2016, they scored 16, and in 2015 they scored a 25.

In 2018, corruption can be found in hospitals, laboratories, and pharmacies in the form of bribery. In 2018 alone, it is estimated that 10,688 TK has been treated through bribery. Over 66% of homes claimed to be victims of corruption in the service industries. Corruption is also found in law enforcement, where over 72% of homes claimed to be victims of corruption in regards to law enforcement. Those who fell victim to corruption found that the most commonly corrupt officials were in law enforcement and passport offices, needing bribes in order to have your claims processed. In addition to bribery, corruption also exists in the forms of lobbying, in the gas industry, in education, water supply, electricity industries, and in many other major industries. Bribery is an underlying theme, linking the problems together.

Slave labor is also quite common in Bangladesh, with over 1.5 million people being forced into labor, directly breaking the prohibition on forced labor. 85% of the slaves are male, and 15% are female, making Bangladesh rank 4th in terms of slave count in the world, only being topped by India, China and Pakistan. Most men work in labor industries like farming or construction, while many women and young girls are enslaved in brothels. Linking back in to bribery, brothel owners have been found to bribe the police to convince them that the children are at least 18, the legal age to work as a sex worker in Bangladesh. These women and girls make very little money, as the brothel owners keep most of the profits. More than a quarter of sex workers in Bangladesh entered the field as a result of being sold or forced into bondage.

== Digital and privacy rights ==
According to The Digital Police State, a 2025 investigative report by the Tech Global Institute, Bangladesh's surveillance framework has evolved from colonial-era policing and post-independence military intelligence practices into a highly digital system of interception and monitoring. Current practices include metadata analysis, remote eavesdropping, and content filtering, accelerated under the justification of counterterrorism. Between 2015 and 2025, surveillance and spyware systems imported into or deployed in Bangladesh included IMSI catchers, Wi-Fi interceptors, and commercial spyware such as Pegasus, FinFisher, and Predator. The Tech Global Institute estimated that Bangladesh spent nearly US $190 million on surveillance and spyware between 2015 and 2025, with the National Telecommunications Monitoring Centre accounting for more than US $100 million of that amount. According to the report, NTMC procured deep-packet-inspection and decryption platforms for internet interception, while the Information and Communication Technology Division's BGD e-GOV CIRT invested in social-media and web-content monitoring tools. Spending reportedly peaked before national elections in 2018 and 2024, suggesting links between surveillance procurement and electoral cycles.

The report further describes how surveillance operates within a fragmented legal and institutional environment marked by limited transparency and accountability. It identifies a network of intelligence and law-enforcement bodies empowered through non-public executive orders, operating largely without explicit statutory authorization or independent oversight. The legal framework grants broad, discretionary powers that have produced de facto impunity and institutional invisibility for those carrying out surveillance and their collaborators, allowing such actors to operate without public disclosure, judicial scrutiny, or administrative sanction. Bangladesh has no specialized parliamentary committee overseeing intelligence agencies, and judicial review of surveillance practices remains limited.

In November 2025, the government introduced the Bangladesh Telecommunication (Amendment) Ordinance, 2025, which proposes significant reforms, some in line with international human rights standards on surveillance.

In recent decades, Bangladesh has seen the emergence of digitally coordinated vigilante networks engaged in online moral policing, harassment, public shaming, and doxxing of individuals perceived to violate prevailing social or religious norms. Media reports have documented cases in which such groups have targeted persons suspected of being in interfaith relationships by circulating their photographs, social media profiles, and personal information, leading to coordinated harassment of the individuals and their families both online and offline. Commentators and scholars have argued that such activities raise concerns regarding the rights to privacy, dignity, and personal liberty, and contribute to a climate of intimidation and social control based on prejudice, with disregard for the fundamental human rights of the victims. Similar online vigilante activity has also been reported against other vulnerable or marginalized groups, including women accused of violating conservative social norms, religious minorities, atheists, SOGI individuals, and individuals accused of "immoral" conduct. Members of these networks, including administrators and those who carry out harassment and related activities, frequently operate with anonymity and impunity. Some reports have further suggested that online harassment campaigns of this nature may have led to real world violence in some cases.

== See also ==
- Centre for Law and Mediation (Bangladesh)
- Persecution of Biharis in Bangladesh
- Prostitution in Bangladesh
- Crossfire (Bangladesh)
- Chhatra League's guest room practice
- HIV/AIDS in Bangladesh
- List of defamation of religion cases under section 57 in Bangladesh
- United States sanctions on Bangladesh
