= 1962 Rajshahi massacres =

Ethnic violence against Hindus in East Pakistan

The Rajshahi massacres, marked by widespread ethnic violence and killings of minority Hindus, took place in April 1962 in the Rajshahi and Pabna districts of East Pakistan. People and property were attacked. Around three hundred non-Muslims died in the massacre.

== Killings ==
On 22 March 1962, an ethnic riot broke out between the Santhals and the Muslims in the Malda district of West Bengal. The Santhals, armed with bows and arrows, shot dead three Muslims, while six were burnt to death. Between 16 and 20 April, the ethnic tension between the two groups led to another ethnic riot.

The Pakistani press not only published exaggerated figures of Muslim casualties in Maldah district, even though there was no incident of ethnic violence in the district. Pakistan Radio also broadcast false stories of atrocities on minorities in India. On 22 April, Lieutenant General Muhammad Azam Khan, the Governor of East Pakistan, delivered an inflammatory speech with claims of torture of minorities in India. On 23 April, the Bengali Hindus and other ethnic minorities were attacked in the Rajshahi Division. The District Magistrate of Rajshahi did not take any steps to stop the attacks. Killings, rape, loot, and arson continued for days. They were attacked in the passenger trains at the Rajshahi railway station and in the market adjacent to the Natore railway station. In Hujuri Para Union, under Paba thana, there was a Hindu-Muslim riot. Prabhas Chandra Lahiri wrote that in Darsa village under Paba police station, 1,200 people were killed, and an estimated 3,000-5,000 non-Muslims were killed in Rajshahi district.

The Assistant High Commissioner in Rajshahi came to the rescue of the minorities. The intervention of the Indian Assistant High Commission resulted in the troops being called, and the massacre was stopped. The Pakistan government whipped up a war hysteria, and the Indian Deputy High Commission at Dhaka was placed under military guard. It was impossible for the Indian Deputy High Commission to collect information on the attacks on the minorities. Rajeshwar Dayal, the Indian High Commissioner to Pakistan who had come to Dhaka too, was not allowed to visit the districts of Rajshahi and Pabna.

== Exodus ==
Around 11,000 Santhals and Rajbanshis migrated to India.

== See also ==
- Freedom of religion in Bangladesh
- Human rights in Bangladesh
