= 1989 Bangladesh riots =

1989 Bangladesh riot

The 1989 Bangladesh riots were a series of attacks against the Bengali Hindus in October - November, apparently as a reaction to the laying of the foundation of Ram temple adjacent to the demolished Babri Masjid in Ayodhya, India. During the riots, thousands of Hindu homes and businesses were destroyed. More than 400 Hindu temples were destroyed.

On 30 October 1989, Hindu shops were looted and set on fire in Chittagong, in spite of a curfew. Hindu men and women were attacked and molested. On 10 November, a Muslim mob shouting anti-Hindu slogans took out a procession in Khulna. Hindu temples were attacked and destroyed by the mob. On 11 November, a Muslim mob attacked Hindu shops and temples in Narsingdi. More than 25 Hindu-owned shops were set on fire and images in three temples were smashed. The mob was led by Maulana Tajul Islam, who carried firearms and raised anti-Hindu slogans.

On 17 November, the Hindu students of Brojomohun College in Barisal were attacked, beaten up and thrown out of the hostel. In Comilla, brick-bats were thrown on Hindu devotees during the Ram Thakur festival. Some of the devotees were seriously injured. On 18 November 1989, about 500 Muslims hurled stones at Hindu-owned shops in Khulna, injuring at least 50 people.

== See also ==
- Persecution of atheists and secularists in Bangladesh
- Freedom of religion in Bangladesh
- Human rights in Bangladesh
