= 2012 Hathazari violence =

2012 Hathazari Violence denotes a series of attacks against the minority Hindu community by the majority Muslim in Hathazari Upazila of Chittagong District in the Division of Chittagong, Bangladesh on the 9 and 10 February 2012.

== Events ==
On 9 February 2012, the Hindus in the area took out a procession to celebrate the anniversary of the foundation of the Lokenath Sebasram. When the procession was passing a mosque, Muslims in the mosque forbade them to play drums. At one stage, someone hurled a brick bat on the procession. An altercation took place at once which turned into chase and counter-chase when someone from the procession responded by throwing a brick bat. Police organised a meeting between the two parties which was allegedly delayed with ill-intention. A group of Muslims said that the meeting will be held in the mosque and the Hindus agreed.

The meeting started in the evening. Requesting anonymity, several of those who attended the meeting told that a handful of miscreants vandalised a temple on the Loknath Sebasram premises when the meeting was underway.

Muslims first vandalised a temple on the Loknath Sebasram premises when the meeting was underway. The idols and the temple premises were vandalised. At that night local Islamists named Emdad Ullah and Mohammad Lokman hired a construction worker named Mohammad Jasim to break down the wall of the local Mosque to divert away vandalisation of Lokhnath Temple.

The following day, the perpetrators spread the rumour that Hindus had destroyed the mosque. Thousands of students of the Darul Ulum Muinul Islam madrasa, after reciting their juma prayers on the road, attacked the Raksha Kali Mandir at Hathazari and torched the temple. Muslims also vandalised about 50 Hindu homes in the locality. A 500-strong Police contingent and four platoons of Border Guards Bangladesh personnel were deployed in the Upazila to control the condition. Section 144 was clamped on Hathazari on Friday, 10 February 2012.

== Aftermath ==
Advocate Rana Dasgupta, the general secretary of the central committee of Bangladesh Hindu Buddhist Christian Oikya Parishad visited the affected areas of Hathazari. On 19 February, the BHBCOP, held a press conference at the Chittagong Press Club and demanded immediate arrest and punishment of the guilty. According to Dasgupta, 14 temples were affected and shops and houses belonging to the Hindus were looted.

== Investigation ==
After the incident, two cases were filed against more than 800 unnamed people for an arson attack.

On 16 February 2012, police arrested 10 people on charges of vandalising Hindu temples and attacking and injuring the law enforcers. One of the detainees, construction worker Mohammad Jashim, 30, gave a confessional statement at Chittagong's Judicial Magistrates' Court. Apart from Jashim, the detainees are Emdad Ullah, 32, Mohammad Lokman, 46, Mohammad Frid, 35, Mohammad Osman, 35, Mohammad Abu Taher, 40, Manzur Alam, 38, Mohammad Shafi, 38, Abdul Karim, 70, and Hajji Mohammad Badsha, 65.

== High Court order ==
On 1 March 2012 the High Court ordered the government to restore the damaged temples, houses and shops in Hathazari to their previous state. The bench of justices A H M Shamsuddin Chowdhury and Sheikh Md Jahangir Hossain issued the orders and also summoned Hathazari Police Station officer-in-charge Samiul Islam and district superintendent ZA Morshed. The duo appeared before the judges at the hearing. The court directed inspector general of police to supervise the case filed over the incidents.

Advocate Abdul Matin Khosru argued for the ASP and OC while deputy attorney general A B M Altaf Hossain defended the government.

== See also ==
- Persecution of indigenous peoples in Bangladesh
- Freedom of religion in Bangladesh
- Human rights in Bangladesh
