= Bangladesh Hindu Buddhist Christian Unity Council =

Minority organization in Bangladesh

- বাংলাদেশ হিন্দু বৌদ্ধ খ্রিষ্টান ঐক্য পরিষদ
- Abbreviation: BHBCUC
- Formation: 1988
- Founder: Chitta Ranjan Dutta
- Type: Non-Profit Organization
- Purpose: Restoration of equal rights for all citizens of the nation
- Location: Bangladesh
- Method: Advocacy to governments, working with other NGOs
- Official language: Bangla
- Acting General Secretary: Manindra Kumar Nath
- Website: bhbcop.org

The Bangladesh Hindu Buddhist Christian Unity Council (Bengali: বাংলাদেশ হিন্দু বৌদ্ধ খ্রিষ্টান ঐক্য পরিষদ) is a non-profit organization established to protect the human rights of the religious minorities of Bangladesh. The members and public donations are the source of funds for this charitable organization.

Rana Dasgupta is the general secretary of the Bangladesh Hindu Buddhist Christian Unity Council.

== History ==
This non-partisan organization was initially founded in 1975 in Dhaka, Bangladesh, by Chitta Ranjan Dutta, a retired major general of the Bangladesh Army. It was officially founded in June 1988 by Chitta Ranjan Dutta with other two current presidents of BHBCUC, Bodhipal Mohathero and T.D. Rosario.

On 9 June 1988, Islam was declared as the state religion with the Eighth Amendment Act of the Constitution of Bangladesh; on that very day BHBCUC was formed, although announcement was done sometimes later. 9 June was observed as Black Day by BHBCUC. Later, in 1990, the non-resident Bangladeshi minorities of North America had formed a division of BHBCUC in New York. A Canadian chapter was formed in 2005 in Toronto. It also has branches in European countries like France.

== Activism ==
Following the removal of Hasina, a power vacuum ensued, marked by attacks on Hindus and other minorities, and the torching of the Indian government-run Indira Gandhi Cultural Center in Bangladesh's national capital Dhaka. There have been thousands of attacks on Hindus in Bangladesh, with Hindu homes, businesses and places of worship being targeted en masse. The Bangladesh Hindu Buddhist Christian Unity Council reported that from 4 to 20 August, a total of 2,010 incidents (including 69 temples) of attacks on minorities took place across the country within this 16-day period, including the homes of 157 families were attacked, looted, vandalised and set on fire while some of their businesses were also attacked, looted and vandalised. Five Hindus were killed in these attacks, of which at least two were confirmed as Awami League members.

According to a UN Human Rights Office report, these abuses also affected Ahmadiyya Muslims, Hindus, and indigenous people from the Chittagong Hill Tracts. In April 2024, the council shared a notice purportedly issued by the Bangladesh Jamiyat Ahl-Al-Hadith, claiming the organization offered monetary rewards for converting Hindu women to Islam. Subsequent investigations by fact-checking organizations, including Rumor Scanner, determined the notice was fabricated and digitally altered. The Bangladesh Jamiyat Ahl-Al-Hadith also issued a statement denying any such notice. Following the resignation of Prime Minister Sheikh Hasina in August 2024, the council reported that nine Hindu men were killed in communal violence. However, an investigation by Netra News found no definitive evidence linking these deaths to religious or communal motives, suggesting they were instead due to political retribution, mob violence, or criminal activities. However, according to Bangladeshi newspaper The Daily Star, houses and businesses belonging to the Hindu community were attacked in 27 districts. According to the report, the homes of Pradip Chandra Roy and Muhin Roy were vandalised and looted in Telipara village and Thana road, respectively in Lalmonirhat Sadar upazila.

India officially repeatedly brought up and condemned the issue of Systematic persecution of Hindu minorities in Bangladesh and the risk to safety of Non-Muslim minorities in Bangladesh in December 2024 and again in April 2025.

Randhir Jaiswal, spokesperson for India's Ministry of External Affairs, highlighted the killing of a Hindu community leader Bhabesh Chandra Roy and reminded the Yunus-administration of its responsibility of protection of minority rights, "We have noted with distress the abduction and brutal killing of Shri Bhabesh Chandra Roy, a Hindu minority leader in Bangladesh. This killing follows a pattern of systematic persecution of Hindu minorities under the interim government even as the perpetrators of previous such events roam with impunity".

== See also ==
- Human rights in Bangladesh
- Bangladesh genocide
- List of massacres in Bangladesh
