= Jathibhanga massacre =

1971 killing of Bengali Hindus by Pakistani forces in Thakurgaon District, East Pakistan

Jathibhanga massacre জাঠিভাঙ্গা গণহত্যা
- Part of Bangladesh genocide
- Location: Jathibhanga, Thakurgaon, Bangladesh (then East Pakistan)
- Date: 23 April 1971 (UTC+6:00)
- Target: Bengali Hindus
- Attack type: Burst fire, mass murder, massacre
- Weapon: Machine Guns
- Deaths: 3,000-3,500
- Perpetrators: Pakistani Army, Razakars

The Jathibhanga massacre (Bengali: জাঠিভাঙ্গা গণহত্যা) was a massacre of between 3,000 and 3,500 Bengali & Rajbanshi Hindus in Jathibhanga, Thakurgaon District, East Pakistan (now Bangladesh) on 23 April 1971. It was perpetrated by the Pakistani Army in collaboration with the Razakars as part of the 1971 Bangladesh genocide. The collaborators included members from Jamaat-e-Islami, Muslim League and Pakistan Democratic Party. It is estimated that more than 3,000 Bengali Hindus were killed in the massacre within a few hours.

== Events ==
On the early morning of 23 April, the Hindus from the twelve villages of Jagannathpur, Chakhaldi, Singia, Chandipur, Alampur, Basudebpur, Gauripur, Milanpur, Khamarbhopla and Sukhanpokhari set out for India. On their way, thousands of them gathered at a place called Jathibhanga for the onward journey. Soon after their arrival, the local collaborator blocked their exit routes out of Jathibhanga and informed the Pakistani Army. The Hindu men were led in a procession towards the Jathibhanga grounds. The Pakistani army who had by then arrived in two military trucks, forced the fleeing Hindus to stand in lines and burst fired them using machine guns. The killing spree started in the morning and went on till afternoon. After the military left, the collaborators moved the corpses to near the Pathraj river and covered them with earth.

The estimated casualty varies between 3,000 and 3,500. However, it is generally accepted that more than 3,000 people died in the massacre. An estimated 300 to 500 women were widowed.

== Memorial ==
In 2009, the Bangladesh government constructed a memorial at the site of the mass killing. In 2011, the survivors and the victims of the massacre brought out a mourning rally to commemorate the dead, followed by a condolence meeting. The speakers at the meeting demanded trial of the war criminals.

In August, 2011, The Bangladesh government granted one time compensation of BDT 2,000 to 89 widows. Touhidul Islam, the Upazila Nirbahi Officer of Thakurgaon Sadar Upazila stated five hundred widows of Jathibhanga village would be brought under this scheme phase by phase.
