= Ahmadiyya in Bangladesh =

Islamic movement

Ahmadiyya Muslim Jama'at, Bangladesh
- আহ্‌মদীয়া মুসলিম জামা'ত, বাংলাদেশ
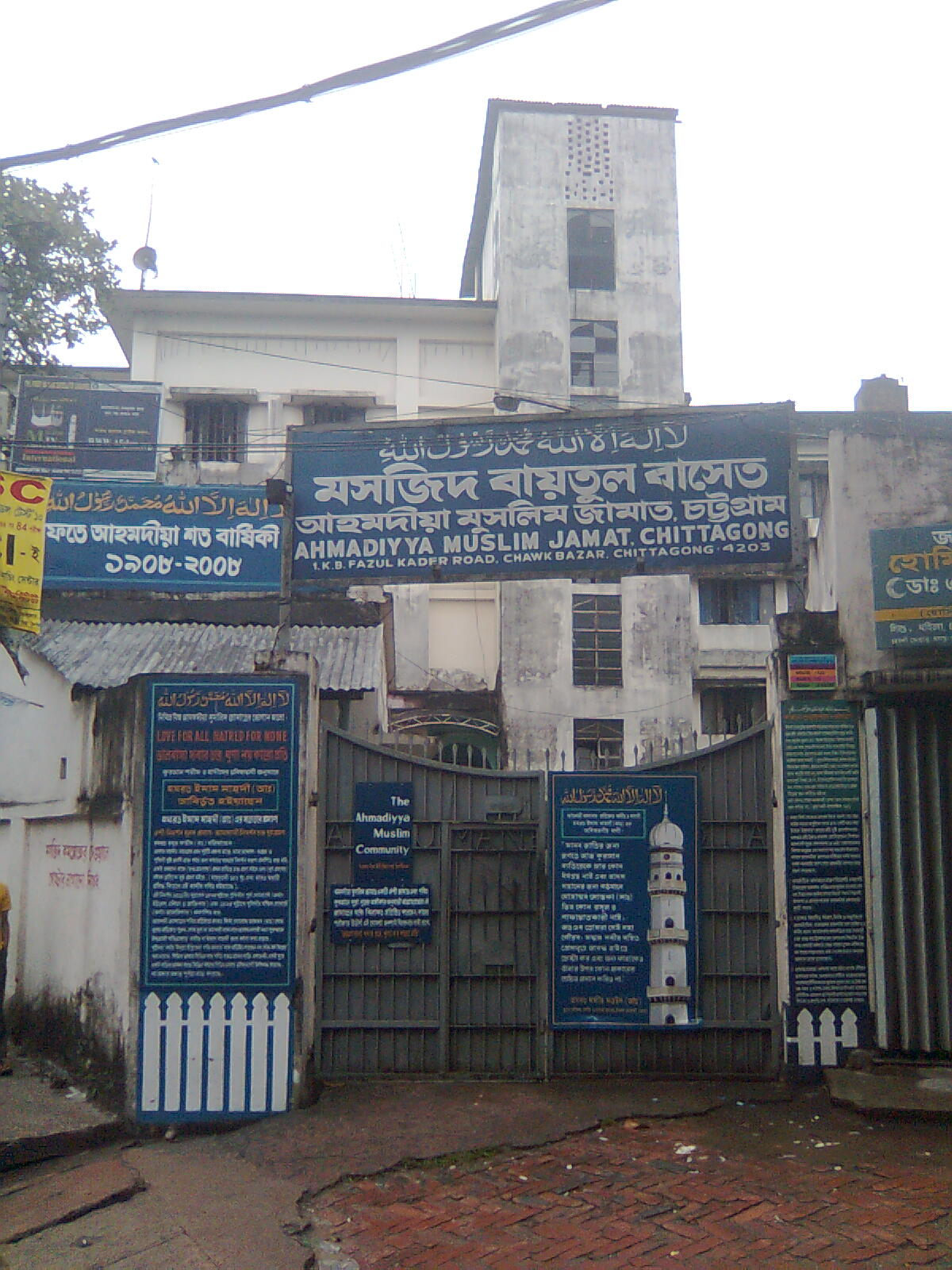
- Masjid Baitul Baset, an Ahamadiya mosque in Chittagong
- Formation: 1913
- Type: Religious Community
- Headquarters: Bakshibazar, Dhaka
- Website: www.ahmadiyyabangla.org

Ahmadiyya is a minority independent sect in Bangladesh. Although the first Bengalis to join the community did convert during the lifetime of Mirza Ghulam Ahmad, the religion was first established as a community in the region of Bengal in 1913 by Syed Muhammad Abdul Wahed, during the Caliphate of Hakeem Noor-ud-Din. As the worldwide community is itself is a highly organised group under the Caliph, the national community works under the name Ahmadiyya Muslim Community Bangladesh or Ahmadiyya Muslim Jama'at Bangladesh (Bengali: আহমদীয়া মুসলিম জামা'ত, বাংলাদেশ; abbrv. AMJB). There are an estimated 100,000 Ahmadis in the country as of 2004.

== History ==
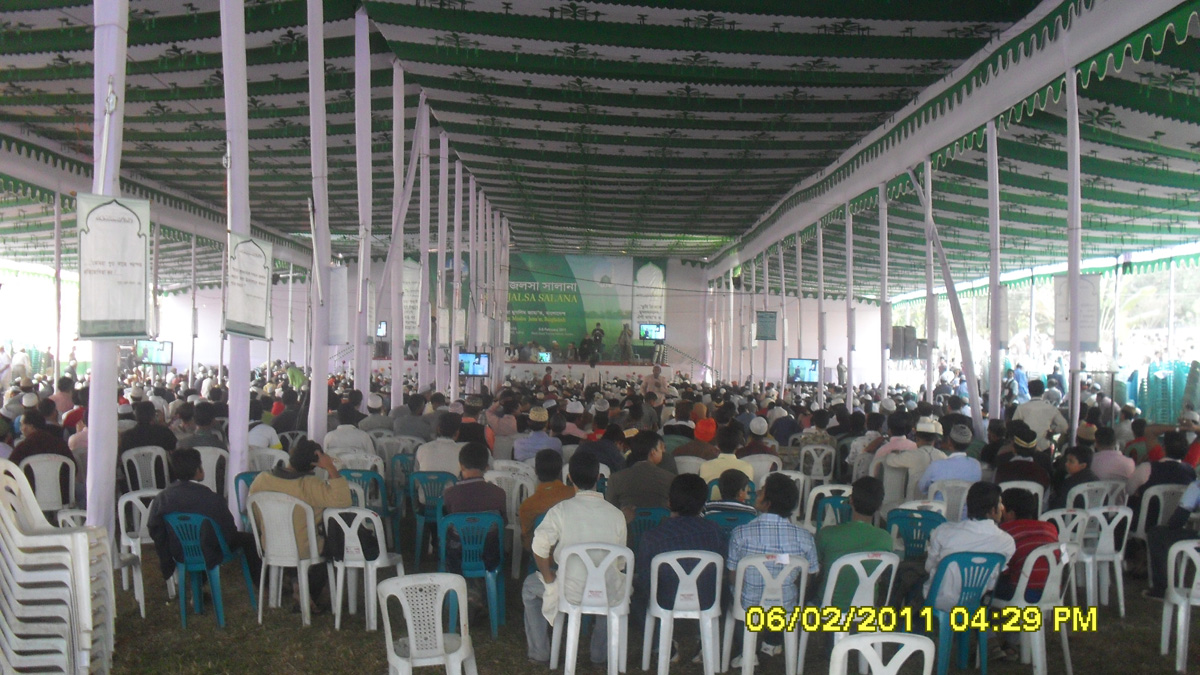
87th annual convention of Ahmadiyya Jama'at Bangladesh

The Ahmadiyya movement is thought to have reached Bengal in 1905, with Ahmad Kabir Noor Muhammad of Anwara, Chittagong, pledging allegiance to Mirza Ghulam Ahmad. He was then followed by Rais Uddin Khan of Kishoreganj. His wife, Syeda Azizatunnisa, also pledged allegiance and thus became the first Ahmadi woman from Bengal. In 1909, a student named Mubarak Ali from Bogra visited Qadian, where he became a member of the movement. The Ahmadiyya movement gained speed in 1912 after the allegiance of Syed Muhammad Abdul Wahid Ahmadi, a Brahmanbarian mawlana. The Ahmadiyya Community became officially established in Bengal in 1913 with the name of "Anjuman e Ahmadiyya".

Ahmad Taufiq Choudhury, who belonged to the Sunni zamindar family of Selbaras, joined the Ahmadiyya movement, where he became the regional leader of Khuddam-ul Ahmadiyya in Sylhet. He later migrated to Mymensingh and became the Ameer (leader) of Ahmadiyya Jamaat Bangladesh after independence.

== Persecution ==
Since its establishment in Bangladesh, members of the Ahmadiyya Community have faced persecution from Muslim groups. In 1963 two Ahmadis were killed in Brahmanbaria. In 1992, the Ahmadiyya headquarters in Dhaka were attacked by a mob, and a number of Qurans & other books were burnt. In 1999, a bomb blast at an Ahmadiyya mosque killed seven people. On 29 October 2003, an Ahmadi Imam named Shah Alam in Roghunathpurbak village in Jhikargachha upazila of Jessore was killed. In 2004, the International Khatme Nabuyat Movement (IKNM) besieged several Ahmadiyya mosques countrywide. In 2004, the government of Bangladesh banned all religious texts of the Ahmadiyya community.

On 17 June 2010, an angry mob vandalised an Ahmadiyya mosque and the house of an Ahmadiyya believer at Ghatail upazila in Tangail on Thursday. In February 2013, a mob set fire to Ahmadiyya property at a site that had been prepared to hold the community's centenary celebrations, causing tens of millions worth of damage in local currency. On 19 February, Shah Ahmad Shafi blamed them for involvement in anti-Islamic activities in Shahbag protests in his open letter named An Open Letter from Shah Ahmad Shafi to the Government and the Public.

On 25 December 2015, an Ahmadi Muslim mosque in Rajshahi was bombed during friday prayer by a suicide bomber, resulting one fatality (the perpetrator) and more than ten people injured.

In March 2023, after Ahmadiyya homes were attacked in Panchagarh District, Former Prime Minister Sheikh Hasina donated 10 million BDT to the Ahmadiyya families affected.

Ahmadiyya in Bangladesh were attacked after Non-Cooperation Movement (2024).

== Countrywide centers ==
- The Bangali Ahmadiyya Community currently has 120 local chapters across the country, in 425 cities and villages.
- There are 65 missionaries, an MTA (Muslim Television Ahmadiyya) studio in Dhaka, and a Jamia Ahmadiyya (Missionary Training College).
- Maharajpur Mosque in the Natore District
- Ahmadiyya Mosque in Khulna
- Galim Gazi Mosque in Betal, Kishoregonj

== List of Bangladeshi Ahmadis ==
- A. M. Mahmuduzzaman
- Amjad Khan Chowdhury
