= Shankharibazar massacre =

1971 massacre of Bengali Hindus in East Pakistan

Coordinates: 23.7100°N 90.4097°E

- Part of Bangladesh genocide
- Location: Shankharibazar, Dhaka, East Pakistan
- Date: 26–27 March 1971 (UTC+6:00)
- Target: Bengali Hindus
- Attack type: Massacre
- Weapons: Machine guns, rifles
- Deaths: 212
- Perpetrators: Pakistani Army, Razakars

The Shankharibazar massacre (Bengali: শাঁখারীবাজার গণহত্যা; [ʃãkʰaɾibadʒaɾ ɡɔɳɔɦot̪ːa]) was a massacre of over 212 Bengali Hindus in the Shankharibazar area of Old Dhaka in East Pakistan on 26 March 1971 by the Pakistani occupation army. The survivors fled to the villages on the other side of the Buriganga, in the region now known as Keraniganj. Shankharibazar became deserted and dead bodies remained on the streets for quite a long time. The Pakistani establishment renamed the Shankharibazar Road to Tikka Khan Road.

== Events ==
On the evening of 25 March, the Pakistani army took to the streets. They proceeded towards Sadar Ghat along the Nawabpur Road. At the crossing of Shankharibazar Road, they shelled a house, as a result of which a portion of the house got destroyed. Three people died in the shelling and five to six people were injured.

On the afternoon of 26 March, the Pakistani army attacked Shankharibazar. They entered premises no. 47 and killed the father and younger brother of the family. The elder brother Amar Sur, who survived the massacre fled through the narrow lane in the rear of the house. The military men ordered the residents to come out of their houses. When they came out they were shot to death. The Pakistani army continued their killing spree in the premises of the locality and killed around 50 Hindus. More than 200 Hindus were injured in the assault. The houses were set on fire.

According to eyewitness accounts, 31 Hindus were killed in the residence of Chandan Sur alone. Chandan Sur was one of the established and influential men in the area. Before the elections, Khwaja Khairuddin of the Dhaka Nawab family had unsuccessfully tried to coerce Sur on his side. Khairuddin was contesting the elections against Sheikh Mujibur Rahman. It has been alleged that during the massacre, Khwaja Khairuddin led the Pakistani military to the residence of Chandan Sur. According to Kalidas Baidya, 126 Hindus from the neighbourhood were rounded up in one house and shot to death.

== Memorial ==
In 1972, a memorial was erected on the eastern end of the Shankharibazar Road in memory of the victims of the Shankharibazar massacre. Sheikh Mujibur Rahman promised the family of the victims a compensation sum of 2,000 Taka. However, the victims' families have reportedly not received any compensation to date. In 1997, on the occasion silver jubilee of Liberation of Bangladesh, the Shankharibazar published a souvenir where the names of the massacre victims were published.
