= Chuknagar massacre =

1971 massacre during the Bangladesh War of Independence

Coordinates: 22.84°N 89.29°E

- Part of Bangladesh genocide
- Native name: চুকনগর গণহত্যা
- Location: Chuknagar, Khulna, East Pakistan (now Bangladesh)
- Date: 20 May 1971 (UTC+6:00)
- Target: Bengali Hindus
- Attack type: Burst fire, mass murder, genocidal massacre, ethnic cleansing
- Weapons: Light machine guns, semi-automatic rifles
- Deaths: 10,000 - 12,000
- Perpetrators: Pakistan Army, Razakars
- Motive: Anti-Hindu sentiment, racism

Chuknagar massacre (Bengali: চুকনগর গণহত্যা) was a massacre of approximately 10,000 to 12,000 Bengali Hindus committed by the Pakistan Army and local collaborators during the Bangladesh War of Independence in 1971. The massacre took place on 20 May 1971 at Dumuria in Khulna and it was one of the largest massacres during the war.

According to local estimates, between 10,000 and 12,000 people were killed, though the exact number of persons killed in the massacre is not known. Academic Sarmila Bose, in her controversial book. dismisses claims that 10,000 were killed as "unhelpful", and argues that the reported number of attackers could have shot no more than several hundred people before running out of ammunition. The majority of people killed in the massacre were men, although an unknown number of women and children were murdered as well. She does admit a massacre took place, but the numbers claimed are unhelpful. Salil Tripathi had criticized Bose for taking at face value defensive statements by Pakistan Army officers, but doubting any claims made by Bangladeshis.

== Background ==
Sheikh Mujibur Rahman led Awami League wins the majority of the parliamentary seats in the 1970 Pakistani general election. The results were not accepted by West Pakistan which led to a politicial stalemate. Following widespread unrest, the Pakistan Military launches Operation Searchlight

== Massacre ==
Chuknagar is a small town at Dumuria of Khulna, adjacent to the Indian border, and on the banks of the Bhodra River. After the Pakistan military launched a military campaign called Operation Searchlight, many people of the Bengali Hindu community started fleeing from Khulna and Bagerhat. It became a transit point for the refugees fleeing to India. India provided shelter to around 10 million refugees from Bangladesh during the War. The chairman of Atlia Union, Ghulam Hossain, had informed the Pakistan Army that refugees were using Chuknagar to flee to India.

They crossed Bhadra River and arrived at Chuknagar to cross the Indian border using Satkhira Road. By May 15, 1971, large numbers of refugees from nearby localities gathered at Chuknagar, as rumors broke out of an impending Pakistani attack. Eye witness Sirajul Islam reported seeing hundreds of thousands of refugees at the area on 20 May. Around 11:00 am, a group of Pakistani military personnel equipped with semi-automatic rifles and light machine guns came on around three trucks. They stopped at a place called Jhautala (then known as Pathkhola) at the left corner of the Chuknagar Bazaar. The Pakistan Army divided into three units. Then they opened fire on the Pathkhola grounds and later moved to Chuknagar Bazaar and continued firing until 3:00 pm or 5:00 pm. An estimated 10 thousand people were killed in the massacre.

Many people drowned as they jumped into the river in a largely futile attempt to flee the carnage. Local people later disposed off the dead bodies by throwing them into the river. Men from a local warehouse were hired to dump the bodies into the river. The Bhadra River had reportedly turned red from all the bodies. One local man who was involved with removing the bodies stated he had removed around 4200 bodies.

=== Further massacre ===
Another massacre of refugees fleeing to India took place at the nearby Dakra area in Rampal Upazila, Bagerhat District. AKM Yousuf led unit of Razakars killed an estimated 700 to 2 thousand people.

=== Survivors ===
Ershad Ali, searching for his father among the dead, instead rescued a toddler clinging to her mother's lifeless body. The baby was also seen by Assistant Professor of Chuknagar Degree College Md Monirul Islam who was searching for his father. The baby, Rajkumari Sundari Dasi, was raised by Ershad's friend Mandar Das. Survivor Surendranath Bairagi saw five of his brothers killed in the massacre.

== Legacy ==
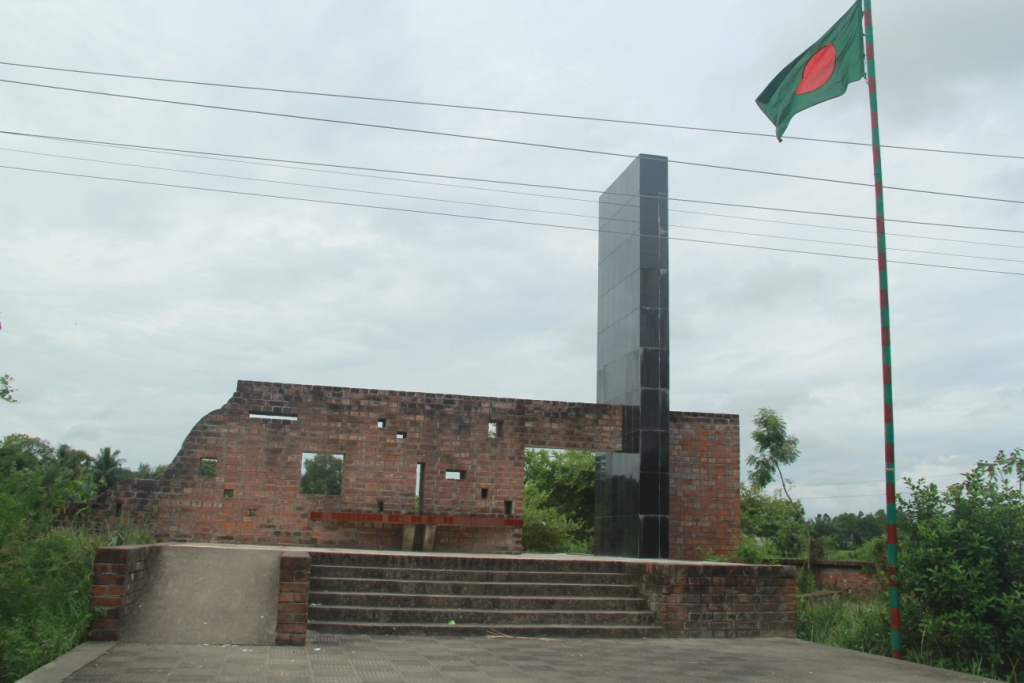
Chuknagar memorial

The government of Bangladesh purchased 78 decimals land in 2005 to establish a monument to the massacre. A memorial was built by the Public Works Department in 2006 to pay homage to the people who died in the massacre. The memorial is called Chuknagar Shohid Smriti Shoudho or Chuknagar Martyred Memorial. The structure is incomplete and has not been properly maintained. The incident is remembered as the Chuknagar Genocide Day.

Tathagata Roy, former governor of Tripura, stated "Jallianwala Bagh pales in comparison" about the massacre. There has been criticism over the lack of effort to preserve the site. On the 51st anniversary of the massacre, activists called on the government of Bangladesh to investigate the massacre, give it proper recognition, and bring the perpetrators to justice.

== See also ==
- List of massacres in Bangladesh
- Jibondhuli
