= 2012 Ramu violence =

Religious persecutions in Bangladesh

The 2012 Ramu violence refers to a series of attacks on Buddhist monasteries, shrines, and houses of Buddhist inhabitants in Ramu Upazila in Cox's Bazar District in Bangladesh by local mobs on the midnight past 29 September 2012. The mobs destroyed 24 Buddhist temples and monasteries and 75 houses in reaction to the tagging of an image depicting the desecration of a Quran on the timeline of a fake Facebook account under a Buddhist male name. The actual posting of the photo was not done by the Buddhist who was falsely slandered. The Buddhist was innocent of the accusation. The violence later spread to Ukhia Upazila in Cox's Bazar District and Patiya Upazila in Chittagong District where Buddhist monasteries and Hindu temples were targeted for attacks.

An estimated 25,000 people participated in the violence directed at Buddhists, and over 300 people were arrested in connection to the attacks.

== Background ==
A person using a pseudonym posted an image depicting the desecration of a Quran on a Buddhist's Facebook page. Some local residents took offence to the incident and staged processions and demonstrations in Ramu in the afternoon and evening of 29 September.

== Events ==
On 29 September, at around 10 p.m., a procession was held in Ramu in protest of the perceived blasphemous image uploaded to a Facebook account. Newspaper reports stated that local Awami League leaders were initially seen mobilising the mob and emphasising the sentimental religious issue to counter the opposition. The Daily Star, a widely circulated national daily, reported that a motley group comprising local leaders of pro-Awami League organisations, BNP men, madrasa students, and common people were allegedly behind the communal violence at Ramu on Saturday night. At a subsequent procession, some people demanded the arrest of the man they believed to be responsible. At around 11:30 p.m., a third procession marched towards Barua Parha, and some of the Buddhist houses were torched. Subsequently, Buddhist temples, monasteries, and residences were also torched. Ten Buddhist villages were attacked as well with gunpowder, kerosene, and petrol used for the purpose. The arson continued till 3 a.m. 30 September.

On 30 September, in the evening, Buddhist monasteries and Hindu temples were vandalized in Ukhia Upazila in Cox's Bazar District. Two more Buddhist monasteries were burnt in Ukhiya early on Monday. At Marichya, the Dipankar Bouddha Bihar was torched, while at Khairatipara, the Pangyamitra Bouddha Bihar was also torched. By Monday, a total of six monasteries and temples have been damaged in Ukhia. The fanatics also burnt the Matri Mandir Hindu temple in Jelepara. The participants burned religious texts and seized Buddha statues.

The violence spread to Patiya Upazila in Chittagong District on Sunday. At noon, Buddhist monasteries and Hindu temples were attacked in Patiya. After the midnight past Sunday i.e. on the early morning of 1 October 500 workers of the Western Marine shipping company torched two Buddhist monasteries and one Hindu temple in Patiya. In Kalagaon, the Ratnankur Bouddha Bihar and the Nabarun Sangha Durgabari were torched as was the Abhay Bouddha Bihar in Lakhera.

Rohingya refugees from Myanmar are suspected to be involved in the attacks. On Tuesday afternoon, 2 October, three Rohingyas were arrested by the police in Chakaria Upazila of Cox's Bazar District while they were trying to attack a Buddhist monastery in Manikpur.

== Investigation ==
On 30 September, an official inquiry committee was constituted and headed by Nurul Islam, the Additional Divisional Commissioner of Chittagong Division. It sat on 1 October and reviewed the reports of the Upazila Nirbahi Officers of the troubled upazilas and the daily newspaper reports.

The Supreme Court on 12 May 2014 directed Tofail Ahmed, upazila chairman of Naikhangchhari upazila of Bandarban, to surrender before a lower court in four weeks in connection with the attack and vandalisation of a Buddhist temple at Ramu in Cox's Bazar in 2012. Tofail is the prime suspect in the Ramu incident according to a governmental investigation report.

== Reactions ==
Groups of Buddhist monks and Hindu groups in Burma, India, Sri Lanka, and Thailand demonstrated in response to the anti-Buddhist violence in Bangladesh. In Colombo, Sri Lanka, some protested outside the Bangladeshi embassy, and a petition was delivered condemning the attacks.

Some windows of the Bangladeshi embassy in Colombo, Sri Lanka were vandalized before police arrived and dispersed the protest.

On 6 October, Bangladeshi Prime Minister Sheikh Hasina condemned the anti-Buddhist violence, stated her belief that it was premeditated, and urged restraint over the issue.

On 8 October the Prime Minister herself visited the affected areas and condemned the incident while promising proper justice.

Prime Minister Sheikh Hasina directed the Bangladesh Army to rebuild these temples under a project titled 'Rebuilding and Renovation of damaged Buddhist Temples', spending Tk 200 million. The Bangladesh Army rebuilt and renovated these Buddhist temples and Bihars in 19 separate places, incorporating the traditional designs of the renowned architects from the Buddhist community.

President of Bangladesh Abdul Hamid on 10 January 2014 visited several rebuilt Buddhist temples and centers at Ramu upazila of Cox's Bazar. During the visit, the president enquired about the wellbeing of local Buddhist community and distributed cheques to the affected members of the community.

== Places of worship destroyed ==
Sl. No.	Name	Type	Place	Date
1	Saada Ching	Buddhist Temple	Ramu, Cox's Bazar District	30 September 2012
2	Laal Ching	Buddhist Temple	Ramu, Cox's Bazar District	30 September 2012
4	Shreekul Cheranghata Barakyang Temple	Buddhist Monastery	Ramu, Cox's Bazar District	30 September 2012
6	Ramu Kendriyo Shima Bihar	Buddhist Monastery	Ramu, Cox's Bazar District	30 September 2012
7	Shreekul Maitree Bihar	Buddhist Monastery	Ramu, Cox's Bazar District	30 September 2012
9	Jadiparha Bouddha Bihar	Buddhist Monastery	Ramu, Cox's Bazar District	30 September 2012
10	Mithacharhi Bonbihar	Buddhist Monastery	Ramu, Cox's Bazar District	30 September 2012
11	Uttar Mithacharhi Bimukti Bhabna Kendra	Buddhist Monastery	Ramu, Cox's Bazar District	30 September 2012
15	Pashchim Ratna Sudarshan Bouddha Bihar	Buddhist Monastery	Kotbazar, Ukhiya, Cox's Bazar District	30 September 2012
16	Dipankar Bouddha Bihar	Buddhist Monastery	Marichya, Ukhiya, Cox's Bazar District	1 October 2012
17	Pragyamitra Bouddha Bihar	Buddhist Monastery	Khairatipara, Ukhiya, Cox's Bazar District	1 October 2012
18	Balukia Kalachand Bijayanta Bibekaram Bihar	Buddhist Monastery	Ukhia, Cox's Bazar District	1 October 2012
19	Ghona Jojoba Bihar	Buddhist Monastery	Ukhia, Cox's Bazar District	1 October 2012
20	Mahayana Bihar	Buddhist Monastery	Ukhia, Cox's Bazar District	1 October 2012
21	Ratnankur Bouddha Bihar	Buddhist Monastery	Kolagaon, Patiya, Chittagong District	1 October 2012
22	Abhay Bouddha Bihar	Buddhist Monastery	Lakhera, Patiya, Chittagong District	1 October 2012
23	Nabarun Sangha Durga Mandir	Hindu Temple	Kolagaon, Patiya, Chittagong District	1 October 2012
24	Matri Mandir	Hindu Temple	Jelepara, Patiya, Chittagong District	1 October 2012

== See also ==
- 2012 Rakhine State riots
