= Aftermath of the July Uprising =

Events after the end of July Uprising of Bangladesh

- 5 August 2024 – 17 February 2026
Premiership of Sheikh Hasina	Premiership of Tarique Rahman
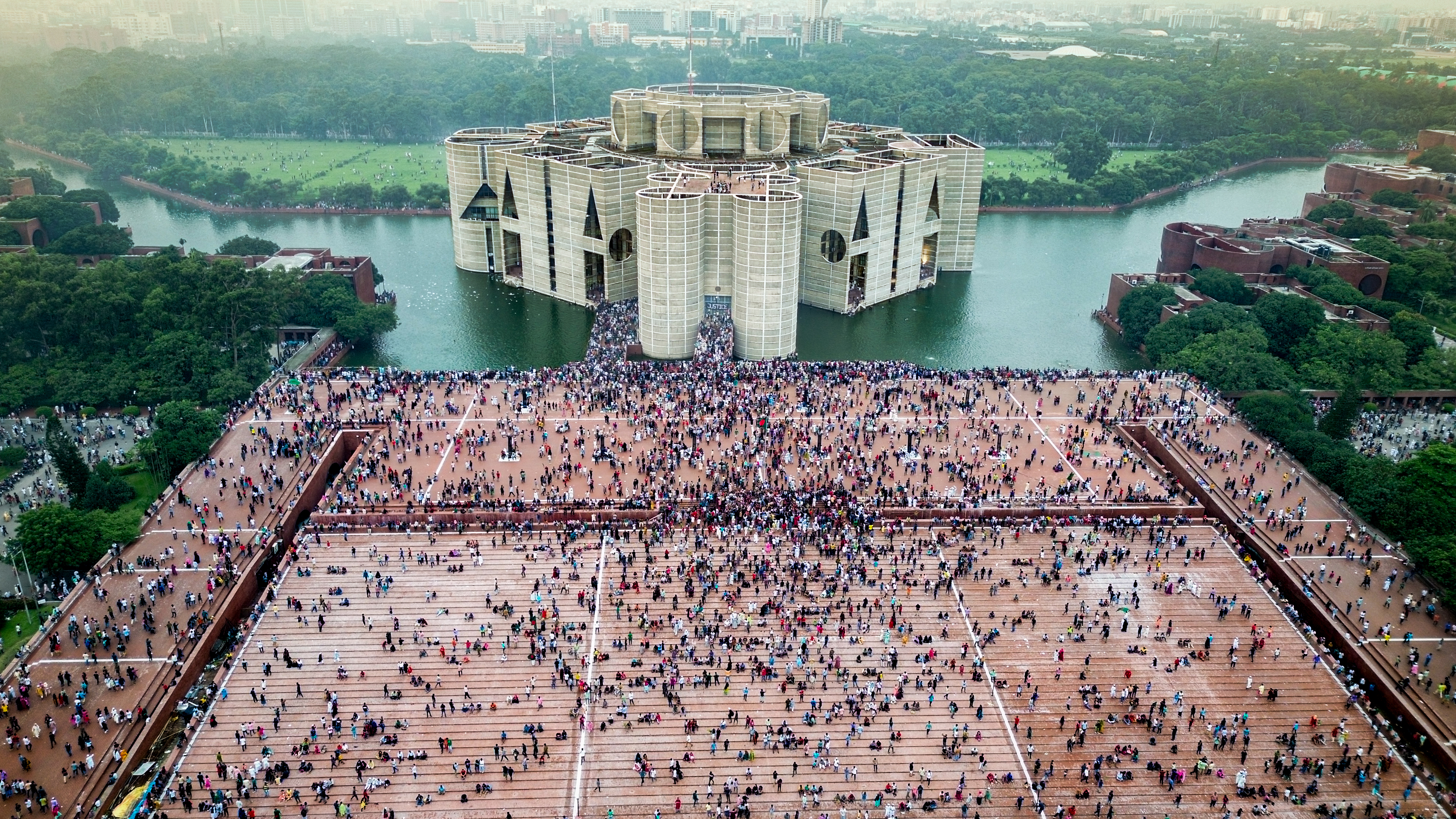
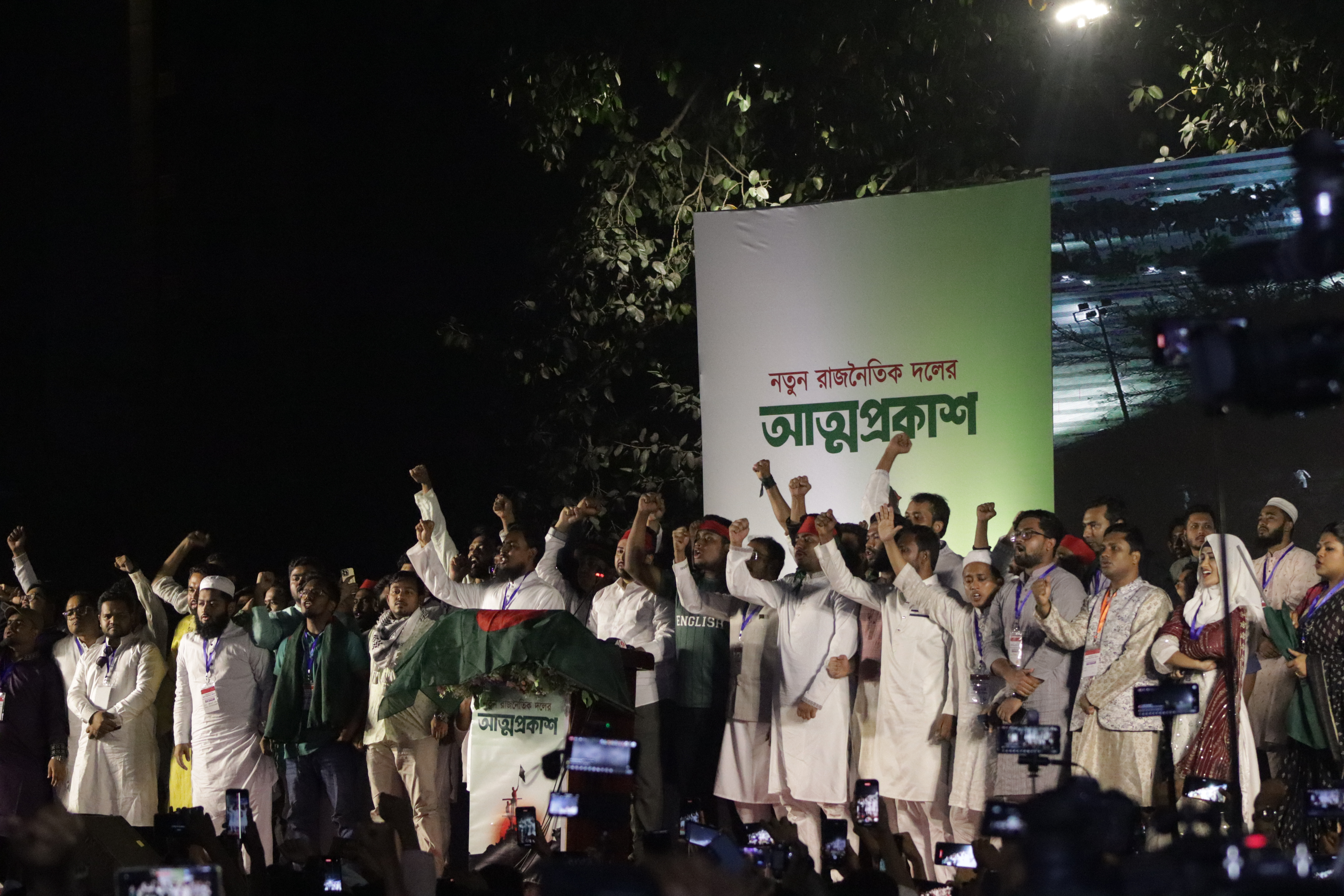
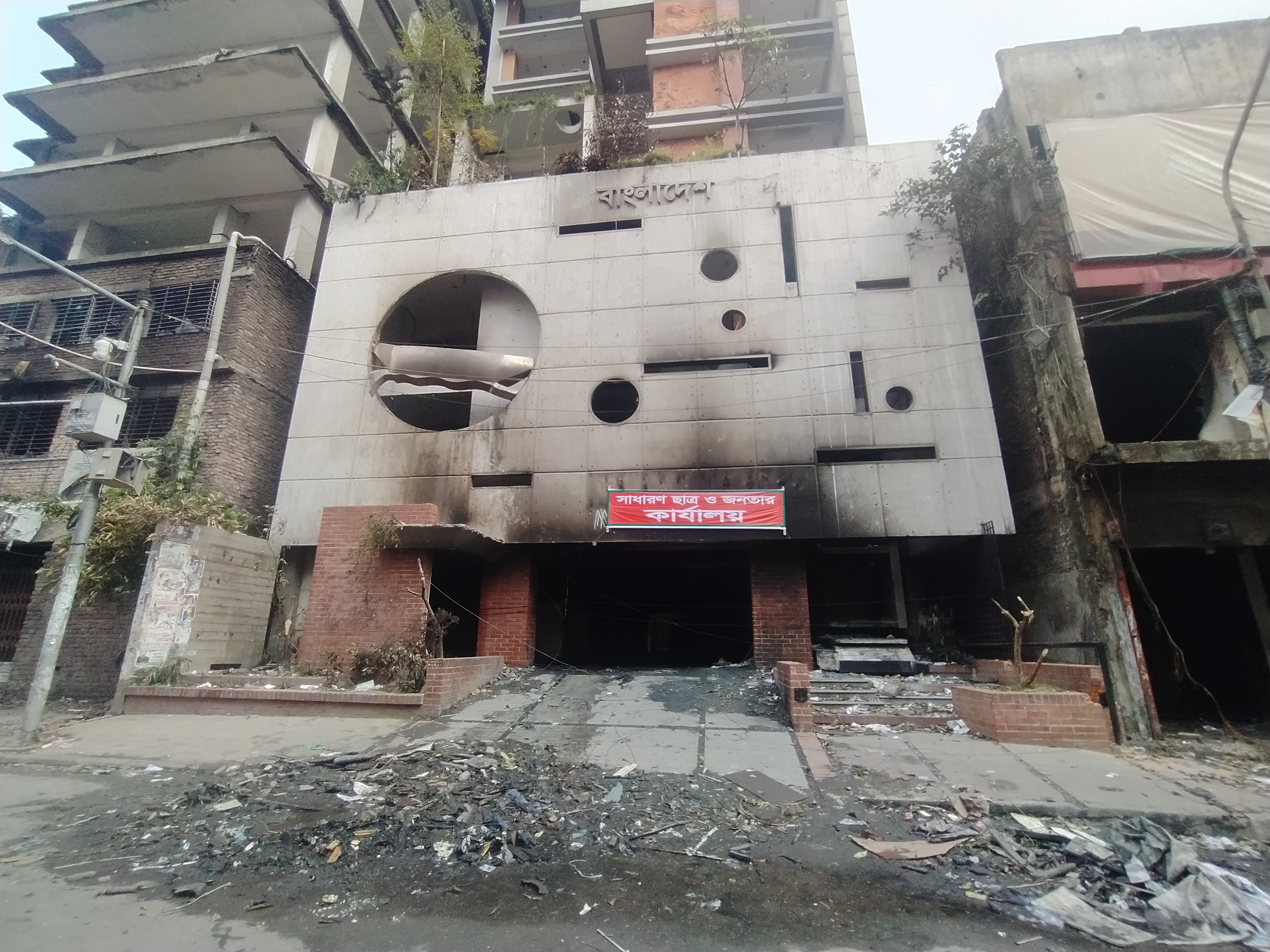
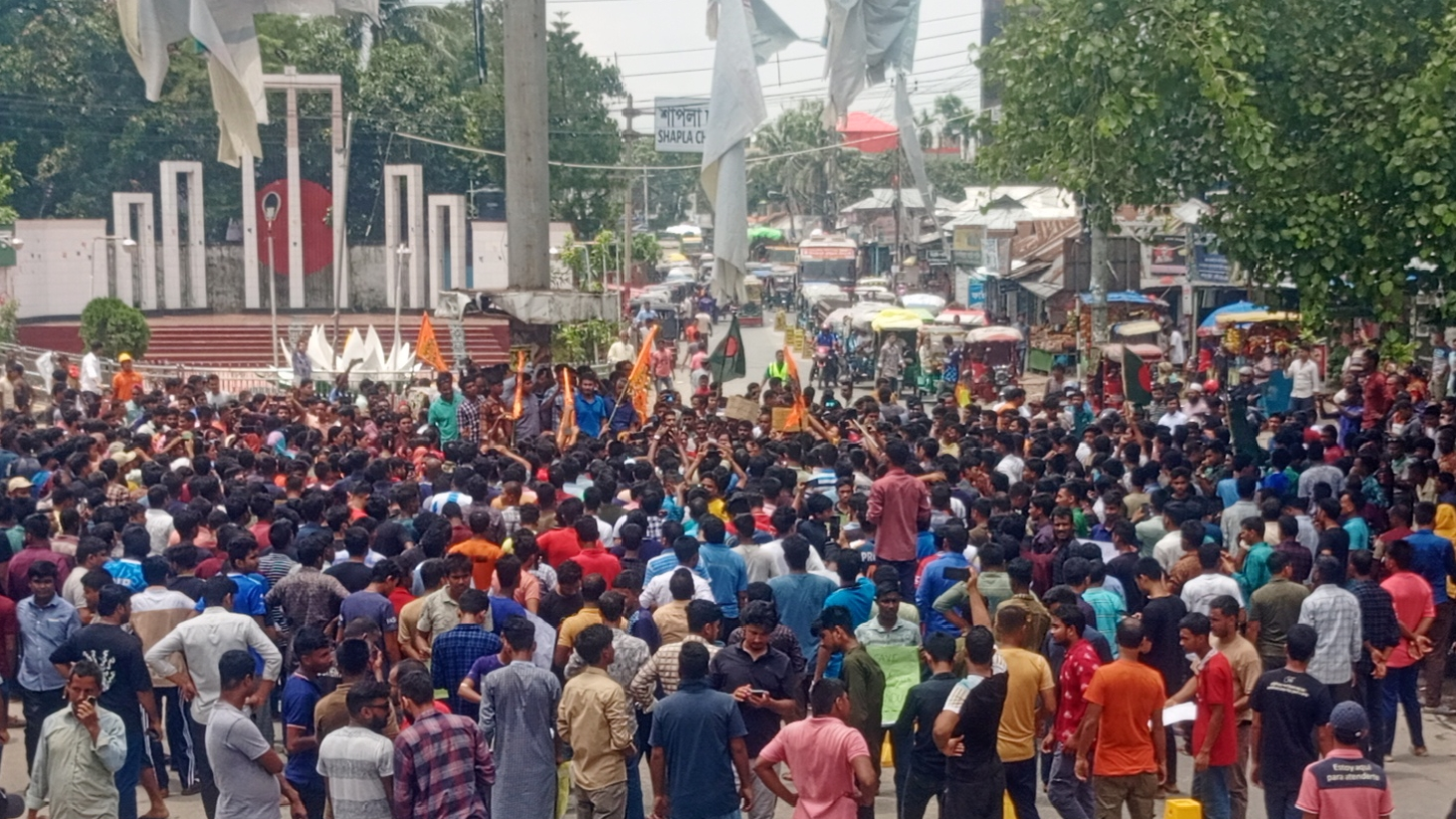
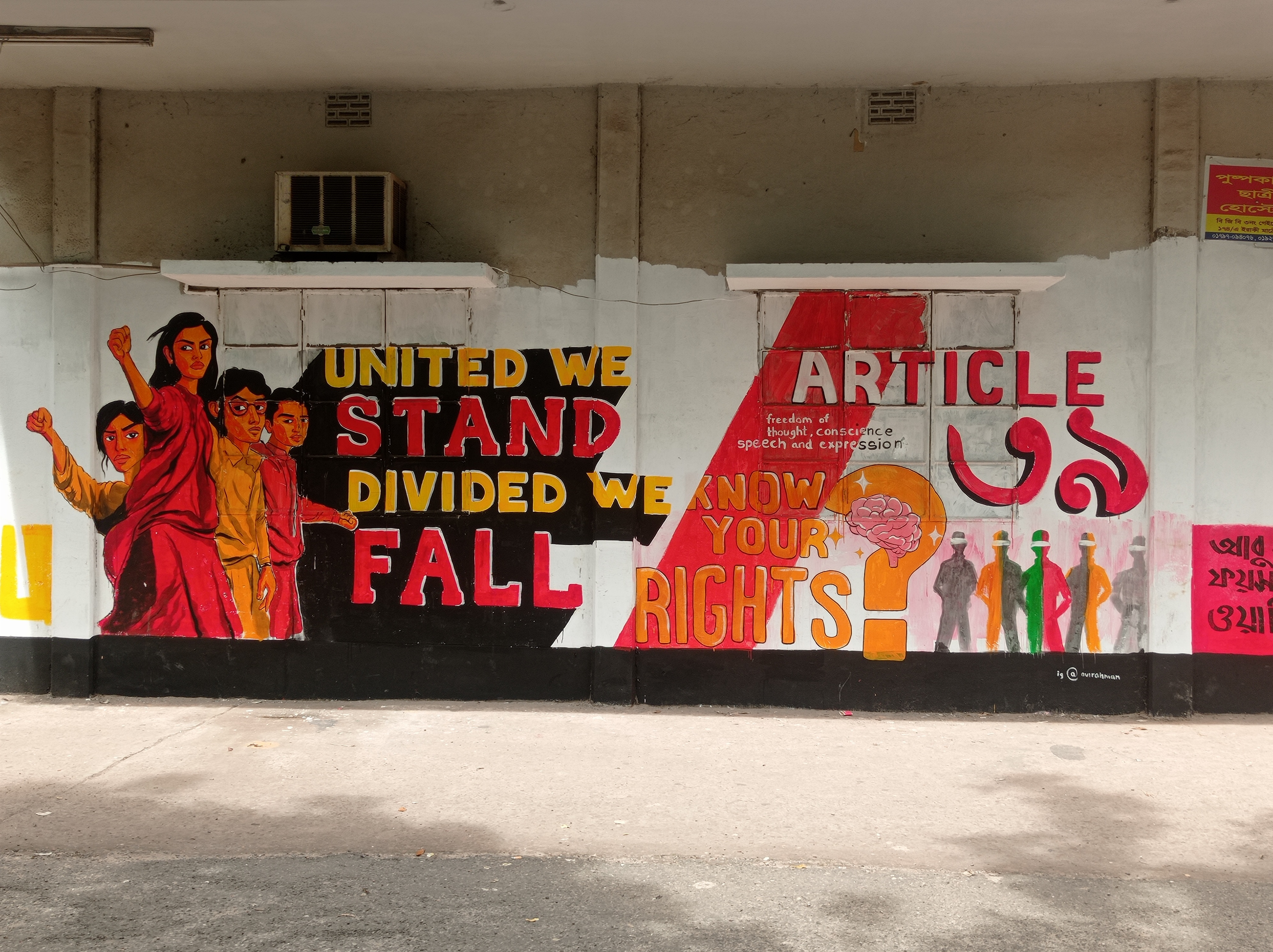
- Clockwise from the top: Protesters occupying the Jatiya Sangsad Bhaban following the success of the revolution • Destroyed Awami League central office in Shaheed Abrar Fahad Avenue • Graffiti made by the students in the University of Dhaka • Hindu rights protests in Rangpur • Launching of National Citizen Party
- Location: Bangladesh (with spillovers in India)
- Including: Interim government of Muhammad Yunus
- Leader(s): Muhammad Yunus, Waker-Uz-Zaman, Nahid Islam, Asif Mahmud, Mahfuj Alam, Sarjis Alam, Hasnat Abdullah
- President: Mohammed Shahabuddin
- Prime Minister: Muhammad Yunus (Chief Adviser)
- Key events: List: Resignation of Sheikh Hasina; Storming of Ganabhaban; Sheikh Mujibur Rahman statue destruction; Post-resignation violence; Anti-Hindu violence; Constitutional crisis; Formation of the interim government; Ansar protest; Killing of Tofazzal Hossain; Hazari Lane violence; Detention of Chinmoy Krishna Das and Murder of Saiful Islam Alif; Attack on the Bangladesh Assistant High Commission in India; Demolition of Dhanmondi 32; Operation Devil Hunt; OHCHR report; Formation of the National Citizen Party; Protests to ban Awami League; 2025 NBR strike; Killing of Lal Chand Sohag; 2025 Gopalganj clashes; July Declaration and Charter; Trial of Sheikh Hasina; Assassination of Osman Hadi, subsequent violence and Lynching of Dipu Chandra Das; 2026 general election and constitutional referendum

Significant political, constitutional, and social changes in Bangladesh followed the July Uprising of 2024 and the resignation of Prime Minister Sheikh Hasina. The uprising was initially sparked by widespread public protests and calls for reform, led to major changes in Bangladesh's political landscape.

In the immediate aftermath of the uprising, the country faced violent unrest, a constitutional crisis and the formation of the interim government. These events prompted further protests and calls for reform, as well as extensive investigations. The entire period marked a pivotal moment in the nation's history, as it reshaped the country's governance, legal framework, and social fabric.

== Violence and destruction ==
=== Domestic ===
On 5 August 2024, following the Resignation of Sheikh Hasina, Bangladesh experienced widespread violence targeting political establishments, minority communities, and significant cultural sites. In Dhaka, the Awami League’s headquarters and the Jatiya Party (Ershad) central office were attacked and set ablaze by unidentified assailants.

On the evening of 5 February 2025, a large group of protesters gathered at Dhanmondi 32, responding to calls on social media for a "Bulldozer March" aimed at demolishing the site, which they referred to as a "shrine of fascism". The protest escalated quickly, with participants breaking through the entrance and vandalizing the interior, including the destruction of a mural of Sheikh Mujibur Rahman. The demolition coincided with a speech delivered by Sheikh Hasina from exile in India. In her address, she urged her supporters to oppose the interim government, labeling it as "unconstitutional", as well as referring to the vandalism of the site,

They may destroy a building, but they won't be able to erase the history.

Following the speech, Hasnat Abdullah, convener of the Students Against Discrimination on a Facebook status update stated,

Tonight Bangladesh will be freed from the pilgrimage site of fascism.

Several civil society members and political organisations condemned the vandalism, while the press wing of the chief adviser referred it as "unexpected and undesirable" and stating it as a "manifestation of anger triggered by Sheikh Hasina's provocative remarks against the July Uprising".

On 7 February 2025, protesters launched an attack on the house of AKM Mozammel Haque, former Minister of Liberation War Affairs, as a part of the Bulldozer March, during which an unidentified individual at a local mosque announced that people were attacking the former minister's home, leading locals to attack the protesters. 15 individuals were injured in the attack and one later succumbed to his injuries. In response to the escalating violence, the interim government launched a nationwide crackdown dubbed "Operation Devil Hunt". By 10 February 2025, security forces had arrested over 1,300 individuals suspected of involvement in the unrest. The Adviser of Home Affairs, Jahangir Alam Chowdhury, vowed that operations would continue "until we uproot the devils".

=== Abroad ===
Following incidents of violence against minorities, a Hindu monk Chinmoy Krishna Das, emerged as a lead figure in the Hindu rights movement. On 25 November 2024, Das was arrested from Hazrat Shahjalal International Airport on alleged charges of sedition. His arrest was based on allegations that he and others had disrespected Bangladesh's national flag by hoisting a saffron flag above it during a Hindu rights rally in Chittagong in October 2024. This act was perceived as a challenge to national sovereignty and is criminalized under Article 123A of Bangladesh Penal Code.

In response to Das's arrest, on 2 December 2024, members of the Hindu Sangharsh Samity, a far-right Hindutva group affiliated with the Vishva Hindu Parishad, forcibly entered the premises of the Bangladesh Assistant High Commission in Agartala, Tripura. The attackers vandalized property and set fire to the Bangladeshi national flag. The incident reportedly took place in the presence of local law enforcement, who did not intervene.

The Government of Bangladesh condemned the attack, describing it as "pre-planned" and a violation of the 1961 Vienna Convention on Diplomatic Relations. In protest, Bangladesh summoned the Indian High Commissioner in Dhaka to formally express its concerns. In response, India's Ministry of External Affairs described the incident as "deeply regrettable" and assured to address the situation. Later, seven individuals were detained on suspicion of being involved in the attack and three policemen posted at the Assistant High Commission area were suspended for alleged negligence in duty.

== Interim government formation ==
Following the resignation of Sheikh Hasina, Chief of Army Staff General Waker-uz-Zaman and President Mohammed Shahabuddin announced the formation of an Interim government to stabilize the political situation. The president initiated discussions with political leaders and dissolved the parliament on 6 August 2024, invoking emergency provisions under Article 72(1) of the Constitution of Bangladesh, which allows the dissolution of parliament before its full term.

The Students Against Discrimination, lead organization of the July Uprising, proposed economist and Nobel laureate Muhammad Yunus, then residing in Paris, to head the Interim government. After deliberations, Yunus accepted the proposal, and the government was formally finalized on 7 August 2024. Yunus was sworn in as the Chief Adviser to the Interim government on 8 August 2024 in Dhaka. Sixteen others were also sworn in as advisers to the cabinet of the Interim government.

== Constitutional crisis ==
The formation of the interim government led to an unprecedented constitutional crisis where, the crux of the crisis being in the ambiguity of the constitutional provisions regarding the appointment of a non-elected individual, Muhammad Yunus, as head of government. Under Article 56(1) of the Constitution of Bangladesh, the prime minister is required to be a member of parliament, but Yunus did not hold a parliamentary seat, creating significant legal uncertainty about his legitimacy.

The dissolution of parliament by President Mohammed Shahabuddin on 6 August 2024 raised further questions. Under emergency provisions in Article 72(1), the president had the authority to dissolve parliament, but critics (Note: Kamal Hossain) argued that this provision was never intended to be used as a pretext for removing an elected government and bypassing parliamentary processes.

Sheikh Hasina condemned the formation of the interim government, calling it "an unconstitutional takeover under the guise of reform". While her son, Sajeeb Wazed Joy, also criticized the move, calling it "a dangerous precedent that undermines democracy". In a post on social media, he accused foreign influences of backing the government.

The Supreme Court of Bangladesh was petitioned to rule on the constitutional validity of the Interim government. Article 123 of the existing constitution states that, general elections must be held within 90 days of the dissolution of parliament. In response, the Interim government, formed a Constitutional Reform Commission and National Consensus Commission to develop a roadmap for the next general election and constitutional referendum on the July Charter alongside the election.

== Judicial coup allegations ==
On 10 August 2024, a plenary meeting of the Appellate Division judges was scheduled, a move considered irregular and unconstitutional by many observers, including LDP Secretary-general Redwan Ahmed. This meeting was perceived as a prelude to issuing a ruling that could undermine the interim government and potentially pave the way for Hasina's return.

Hasnat Abdullah, one of the coordinators of the Students Against Discrimination, called for protests to be held at the Supreme Court premise. Mass protests erupted outside the Supreme Court, with hundreds of students under the banner of Students Against Discrimination, lawyers, and civil society members demanding Hassan's resignation. They accused him of attempting to use the judiciary to restore Hasina to power, calling him a "puppet" of the former regime. Asif Mahmud, one of the Adviser to the Interim government, criticized Chief Justice Obaidul Hassan for convening a full court meeting of the court's Appellate Division without consulting the government and demanded his resignation.

Following the protests, Chief Justice Obaidul Hassan resigned on 10 August 2024. Five other senior judges in Dhaka also resigned, while other judges from cities such as Chattogram, Khulna, and Sylhet followed suit. In total, around twelve judges resigned or were removed as part of the efforts to restore confidence in the judiciary and cleanse it of perceived biases.

== Subsequent protests ==
=== Police strike ===
On 6 August, the Bangladesh Police Service Association initiated a general strike, demanding enhanced security measures for its members. The association expressed regret for the role of the police force in the unrest and violence. It stated that its officers were "forced to open fire", subsequently being portrayed as the "villain". Students and several paramilitary personnel were subsequently seen directing traffic and maintaining law and order functions in across the country in the absence of traffic police. While, Bangladesh Air Force personnel were deployed to secure Hazrat Shahjalal International Airport premise. The Inspector-General of Police, Md. Mainul Islam, issued an order for all officers to report for duty by the evening of 8 August. On 11 August, retired Brigadier General M Sakhawat Hossain, serving as the adviser for home affairs in the interim government, appealed to police officers to resume their duties at their respective stations and provided assurances that their demands will be fulfilled. The strike ended on 11 August following a meeting between the association and the interim government. By 15 August, regular operations at all 639 police stations nationwide had resumed.

=== Bangladesh Bank protest ===
On 7 August, several officials from the Bangladesh Bank initiated a protest near the governor's office with an objective to compel the resignation of certain high-ranking officials due to their alleged involvement in corruption. That same day, one of the bank's deputy governors resigned, with three others expressing their intention to follow suit. On 9 August, the bank's governor, Abdur Rouf Talukder, resigned from his position, citing personal reasons.

=== Hindu rights protest ===
Between August and December 2024, reports emerge of violence against minority communities, particularly Hindus and Ahmadiyyas. Reports indicate that over 2,200 incidents of violence occurred during this period, including attacks on 152 temples resulting in the death of 23 individuals. The attacks drew condemnation from Indian Foreign Minister S. Jaishankar, who urged the interim government to "take decisive action" to protect minority communities. Particular incidents, such as the Hazari Lane violence in Chattogram and the Murder of Saiful Islam Alif is perceived to be some of the cause of these violence.

On 9 August, the Bangladesh Hindu Jagran Mancha organized a protest in Dhaka condemning the attacks on Hindus. The group called for the establishment of a Ministry of Minorities and a Minority Protection Commission, the implementation of strict laws against attacks on minorities, and a 10% quota in parliament for minority groups. Protests against anti-Hindu attacks were also held in Tangail and Khulna.

=== Awami League demonstration ===
On 9 August, thousands of Awami League supporters staged a two-hour blockade on a section of the Dhaka–Khulna highway in Gopalganj, demanding Sheikh Hasina's return. The next day, an intervention by the army to disperse the protestors escalated into a confrontation. The clash resulted in 15 individuals being injured and an army vehicle being set ablaze.

=== Resistance Week ===
On 13 August, the Students Against Discrimination announced a campaign called "Resistance Week", centred around four key demands. These demands included the creation of a special tribunal for the speedy trials of the July massacre during the quota reform and non-cooperation movements; justice for the attacks on minorities following Sheikh Hasina's resignation; the removal of government officials who supported the government, opposed the movement and suppressed the activists; and ensuring equality for discriminated officials in government sectors.

=== Occupation of Dhanmondi 32 ===
On 15 August protesters occupied the Dhanmondi 32 area of Dhaka to prevent Awami League supporters from marching to Sheikh Mujibur Rahman's residence to commemorate the anniversary of his assassination in 1975, a day designated by the Hasina administration as a National Day of Mourning. Thirty people were held by protesters on suspicion of association with the Awami League, particularly those who were found to be carrying images of Sheikh Mujibur or other information relating to the Awami League in their possession or on mobile phones. Protesters were also accused of harassing journalists filming the event following complaints by correspondents from Reuters, The New York Times, and other media outlets. An Awami League activist was injured in the incident and later succumbed of his injuries on 30 August.

Bangladesh Nationalist Party also called for a nationwide sit-in on 15 and 16 August, demanding that Sheikh Hasina be put on trial for genocide in connection with the killings of protesters.

=== Ansar protest ===
On 25 August 2024, a faction of the Bangladesh Ansar, a paramilitary force responsible for securing government installations and assisting law enforcement, protested at the Bangladesh Secretariat. They demanded the nationalisation of their jobs and the abolition of the six-month "rest system", a mandatory leave period after three consecutive years of work. Jahangir Alam Chowdhury, Home Affairs Advisor of the interim government, met with the protesters, announcing a preliminary decision to abolish the rest system. He also assured them that a forthcoming committee would review their demand for job nationalisation. Despite this, the Ansar members were dissatisfied due to the lack of immediate guarantees regarding job nationalisation. Later that day, a clash between Ansar members and a group of students resulted in 50 injuries. On 26 August 303 Ansar members were arrested for unlawful assembly, and nine Deputy Directors and ten Directors of Ansar were transferred from their posts. The DMP prohibited any rallies, meetings, or demonstrations in the vicinity of the Bangladesh Secretariat and the Chief Adviser's residence. One person later died of injuries, they sustained after being caught in the clashes on 4 September.

=== Jumma protest ===
On 20 September 2024, a protest march was organized by a Jumma students' body, starting from the Raju Sculpture and ending at Shahbag, to protest against the recent violence targeting Jumma's in Khagrachhari.

On 18 July 2025, a protest march was organised in Chattagram by Jumma bodies protesting the gangrape of a Tripuri girl in Khagrachhari by Bengali Muslims affiliated with the BNP.

=== Presidential resignation protests ===
In October 2024, during a conversation with Manab Zamin's Chief Editor, Matiur Rahman Chowdhury, the President Mohammed Shahabuddin, quoted that,

"I tried to collect the resignation letter many times but failed. Maybe she did not get the time. When things came under control, one day the cabinet secretary came to collect the copy of the resignation letter. I told him that I too am looking for it."

Citing concerns over the resignation of Sheikh Hasina as Prime Minister, and the legality of the interim government as per the existing constitution.

Following the remarks, protests erupted across the country calling for his resignation as the president. Adviser for Law, Justice and Parliamentary Affairs, Asif Nazrul stated that,

"The president's statement that he did not receive Sheikh Hasina's resignation letter is a lie, and it is a violation of his oath."

The Chief Adviser's Deputy Press Secretary, Apurba Jahangir, during a press briefing at the Foreign Service Academy agreed with Law advisers views and quoted,

"The government also agrees that by lying about the letter, the president has violated his oath"

Asif Mahmud, Adviser for Youth and Sports and Labor and Employment, posted on Facebook stating,

"Prime Minister Sheikh Hasina had verbally communicated her resignation to the President". While she was initially expected to deliver a formal resignation letter at Bangabhaban, the approach of protesters near Ganabhaban reportedly necessitated her departure from the location."

He questioned the implications of the resignation occurring under these circumstances.

During a roundtable discussion organized by Islami Andolan Bangladesh in Segunbagicha, Sarjis Alam, one of the coordinator of Students Against Discrimination quoted,

"If a person like President Mohammed Shahabuddin says that he does not have the documents of Sheikh Hasina's resignation, then it will be up to the student community to decide what action should be taken against him."

Another coordinator, Hasnat Abdullah, also posted on social media stating,

"Awami League as a party should face justice, a new constitution should be written, corrupt Awami bureaucrats should be sacked, all illegal agreements made during Hasina's tenure should be cancelled, and Chuppu (President) should be removed from the post of president immediately."

Nasiruddin Patwary, convener of the Jatiya Nagorik Committee, also criticised President by saying,

"Chuppu (President) is part of the fascist regime. He has no right to remain as president, and we will not allow any element of this regime to persist after the mass uprising."

=== HSC results protests ===
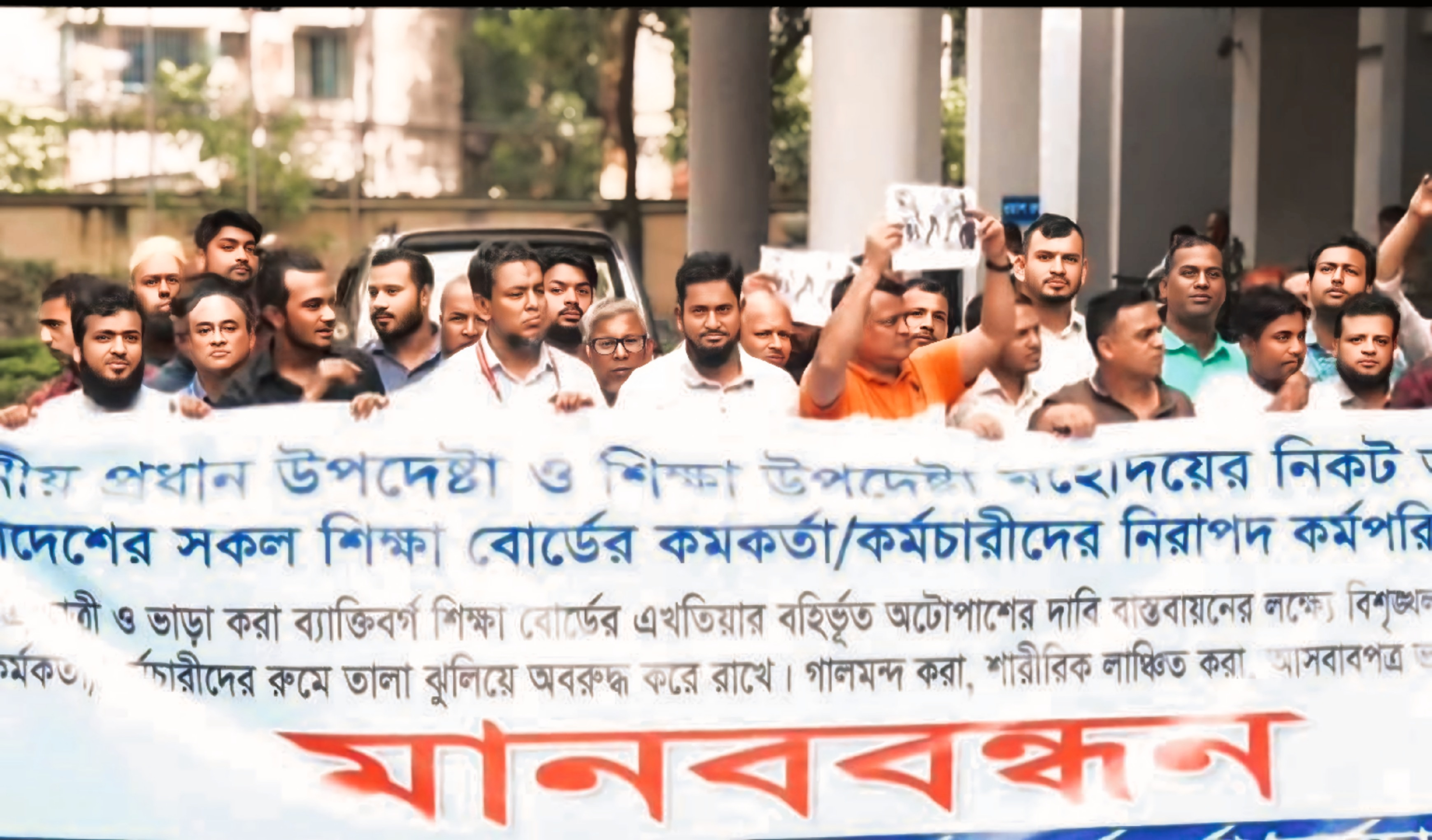
Comilla Education Board Human chain

On 20 August 2024, a group of students in Bangladesh protested the government's decision to cancel the HSC exams. The cancellation was due to widespread protests and unrest across the country. This decision, which was aimed at maintaining public order, was met with mixed reactions. A group of students opposed the cancellation. So, the students initiated further demonstrations on 21 August in front of the Jatiya Press Club in Dhaka, demanding that the exams be rescheduled rather than canceled. Despite the protests, the Board of Intermediate and Secondary Education remained firm in its decision and published the HSC results on 15 October 2024, using a subject mapping method.

On 20 October 2024, students gathered at the Board of Intermediate and Secondary Education, Dhaka, to demand a re-evaluation of the results, which they characterized as discriminatory. During the protest, students broke tables and chairs in the board office as tensions grew, leading to claims of vandalism against the officials who were there. The demonstrators, consisting of students who had failed or received unsatisfactory grades in the 2024 Higher Secondary Certificate (HSC) examinations, entered the premises, leading to physical altercations and damage to office property. Board officials stated that a group of students entered restricted areas and caused significant damage to office property, including the chairman's office. The chairman of the Dhaka Education Board, Professor Tapan Kumar Sarkar, later announced his resignation amid the protests, stating that he would submit his resignation letter to the education minister and address the student's demands.

Students protesting the HSC results have issued several demands:

- Re-evaluation of Results: Students are demanding a re-evaluation of their HSC results, citing concerns over the subject mapping process and the accuracy of the final grades.
- Cancellation of Results: Many students are calling for the cancellation of the results published on 15 October 2024.

Following the initial demonstrations, protests spread to other regions. On 21 October, officials and employees of the Comilla Education Board organized a human chain to protest against the disruptive behavior of students and to demand a safe working environment. The following day, students at the Mymensingh Education Board locked officials inside the board gates; the standoff ended peacefully that evening with students announcing plans to continue their protest at the Bangladesh Secretariat. Board of Intermediate and Secondary Education authorities dismissed the claims of the students.

=== 2025 Khulna clash ===
On 18 February 2025, during a campaign by the student wing of the Bangladesh Nationalist Party, Bangladesh Jatiotabadi Chatradal (JCD), on the campus of the Khulna University of Engineering & Technology, a group of students began protesting against them as they wanted a "politics-free campus." This would end up becoming a clash between the general students and JCD members, alongside some regular BNP members as locals.

The clash would result in at least fifty people being injured and five detained, the clash would lead to the interim government deploying two platoons of the Border Guard Bangladesh, alongside Navy personnel, soldiers of the Army, and RAB personnel, to the Khulna University of Engineering & Technology to prevent further clashes. The campus went shut for straight 6 months after the incident.

=== Islamist protests ===
Islamism and other religious extremist ideologies, which had been harshly suppressed by the Hasina regime, saw a resurgence under the Yunus government. In March 2025, Hizb ut Tahrir Bangladesh, a banned Islamist organisation, organised an open demonstration in the capital city of Dhaka, demanding implementation of sharia as the primary law of the land & resumption of khilafat. In May 2025, Islamists organized massive demonstrations against the Women's Affairs Reform Commission's proposals of gender equality. Anti-Indian sentiments and intolerance against minorities has increased.

== Reform Commissions ==
On 11 September 2024, Chief Adviser Muhammad Yunus announced the formation of several reform commissions aimed at rebuilding and reforming the country and its governance and cleanse it of any bias left behind by the former administration.

1. Public Administration Reform Commission
2. Anti Corruption Commission Reform Commission
3. Judicial Reform Commission
4. Police Reform Commission
5. Electoral System Reform Commission
6. Constitutional Reform Commission
7. Labor Reform Commission
8. Women's Affairs Reform Commission
9. Local Government Reform Commission
10. Mass Media Reform Commission
11. Health Sector Reform Commission

== Investigations and prosecutions ==
On 13 August 2024, a murder complaint was filed at a court in Dhaka against Sheikh Hasina and six other government officials, including former Home Minister Asaduzzaman Khan and former Transport and Bridges Minister and concurrent Awami League secretary-general Obaidul Quader, regarding the killing of a grocer during the protests on 19 July. That same day, the Bangladesh Nationalist Party also submitted a formal request to the United Nations requesting for it to conduct an international investigation into the killings during the protests. In a phone call with chief adviser Muhammad Yunus on 14 August, UN human rights chief Volker Türk said that such an investigation would come "very soon".

On 14 August 2024, a petition was filed by the father of a student killed during the protests at the International Crimes Tribunal calling for an investigation on charges of genocide and crimes against humanity against Sheikh Hasina and nine other individuals, including Obaidul Quader and Asaduzzaman Khan over their role in the crackdown on the protests. The Awami League itself and its associated organisations were also named as accused in the petition, which was formally investigated on by the court later that day. The court began legal proceedings to have Sheikh Hasina extradited on 8 September. On 15 August, two additional murder charges were filed against Sheikh Hasina and several of her associates over the deaths of two people during the protests. On 16 August, another murder charge was filed against Sheikh Hasina, former education minister Mohibul Hasan Chowdhury and several others over the death of a college student during the protests in Chittagong on 18 July.

On 17 August 2024, former shipping minister Khalid Mahmud Chowdhury was charged over an attack on a student protest on 18 July and on 27 August, the interim government dissolved a committee created under Sheikh Hasina's government to investigate the deaths of students during the protests.

The Chief Prosecutor of the International Criminal Tribunal (ICT), Mohammad Tajul Islam, stated that preliminary investigation of the ICT revealed the presence of foreign individuals in police uniform at the protests to suppress the uprising.

The next year, On 12 February 2025, the United Nations fact-finding mission on Bangladesh, published a report by the Office of the High Commissioner for Human Rights (OHCHR), documenting widespread human rights violations during the protests that took place between July and August 2024. The report, based on over 250 interviews and various digital pieces of evidence, outlined several key issues and accused the former administration of "crimes against humanity".

== Formation of National Citizen Party ==
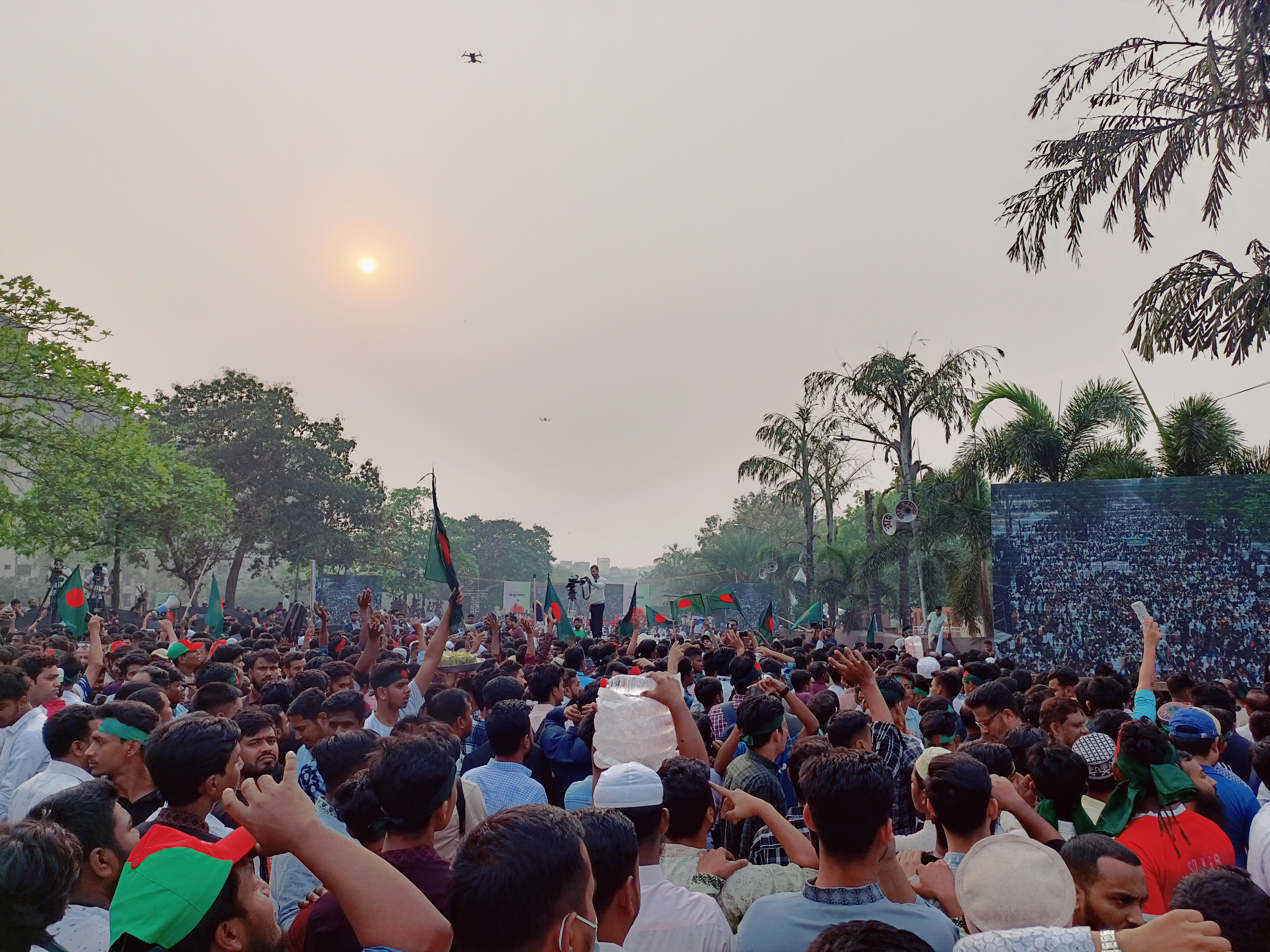
People at the launching ceremony of NCP

The National Citizen Party was initiated by the Students Against Discrimination and the Jatiya Nagorik Committee on 28 February 2025 as the first student-led political party in the history of Bangladesh.

After the fall of the Awami League government, rumours emerged about the formation of a new political party. During the uprising, a manifesto by the leadership of the Students Against Discrimination mentioned the idea of a new political arrangement. Subsequently, in September, the Jatiya Nagorik Committee was formed with the aim of restructuring the country. In December, it was revealed that a new party would be formed in February 2025, and efforts were made to establish committees in every upazila across Bangladesh. In February, the Students Against Discrimination and the Jatiya Nagorik Committee reached a final decision to form a new political party, with plans to announce the formation of the party between 23 and 25 February. The party was formally launched on 28 February 2025, with Nahid Islam from the interim government as its convener.

== Ban on Awami League ==
On 9 May 2025, a massive protest was led by NCP's Hasnat Abdullah & supported by Islamists to ban the Awami League, demanding justice and trial for the party's leaders on International Crimes Tribunal on crimes against humanity. On 10 May, Awami League and it's affiliated organisations were subsequently banned under Anti-terrorism law.

== 2025 Gopalganj clashes ==
On 16 July 2025, a group of attackers clashed with the security forces in Gopalganj, Bangladesh, surrounding a rally of the National Citizen Party (NCP) in the city, when the attackers tried to disrupt the programme with violent means. Television footage showed that attackers, alleged by the NCP and the security forces being the Awami League and Chhatra League, armed with sticks and clubs, attacking the police and setting their vehicles on fire. The violence left at least 5 people dead and several more injured.

The violence created an extremely tense atmosphere in the town of Gopalganj. It received widespread condemnation from various parties, including the interim government.

== July Declaration and Charter ==
An official recognizing document of the July Uprising in Bangladesh, was formally announced by Chief Adviser Muhammad Yunus prior to 5 August 2025, marking the first anniversary of the uprising. The declaration, which was prepared under strict confidentiality, outlined 28 points addressing political, constitutional and governance issues.

The document is characterized by a fundamental rejection of the political framework that existed under the Awami League-led government, advocating for constitutional restructuring and long-term democratic reforms. According to the document, the declaration would be considered effective retroactively from 5 August 2024. On the day of the first anniversary, 5 August 2025, Muhammad Yunus read out the declaration in front of the Jatiya Sangsad Bhaban.

Disagreements persist among political parties regarding the contents of the declaration as well as whether it should be incorporated into the nation's constitution. If consensus is reached, the proclamation is expected to be published as a formal acknowledgment of the uprising.

A political declaration has formed in Bangladesh based on the consensus between 30 political parties and the interim government over the constitutional, electoral, and administrative reforms in the aftermath of the July Uprising in 2024. It was signed on 17 October 2025 at South Plaza of the Jatiya Sangsad by the National Consensus Commission and 24 political parties of Bangladesh, with other two parties signing later, bringing the total to 26 political parties.

Over 80 reform proposals have been proposed in the charter, including constitutional, judicial and legislative reforms. Key proposals include increasing women's political representation in the legislature, imposing prime ministerial term limits, enhancing presidential powers, expanding fundamental rights, and protecting judicial freedom. However, some signatory parties have expressed disagreement to certain proposals, leading the analysts to question the proper implementation of the provisions of the charter.

== Re-investigation of 2009 Pilkhana Massacre and subsequent report ==
Following the Resignation of Sheikh Hasina in August 2024, several speakers at a discussion in Dhaka publicly accused former Prime Minister Sheikh Hasina and the Indian government of involvement in the mutiny, calling for a renewed investigation and the restoration of the force's original name, BDR. Some participants, including retired military officers and relatives of victims, alleged broader political motives and external influence behind the incident.

On 15 December 2024, the Ministry of Home Affairs informed the High Court that it would not form a commission to re-investigate the massacre, prompting public criticism. Two days later, leaders of the Students Against Discrimination announced plans for protests if a commission was not created. On 23 December, the ministry established a seven-member commission to conduct a fresh inquiry.

On 30 November 2025, the commission released its findings, concluding that the massacre was a planned operation rather than a spontaneous mutiny. The report alleged involvement of senior Awami League figures, claiming that Fazle Noor Taposh acted as a key coordinator and that then–Prime Minister Sheikh Hasina approved the operation. It also cited evidence destruction and missing key individuals during the original probe. That same day, the commission's chief stated that 921 Indian nationals had entered Bangladesh around the time of the incident, with 67 remaining unaccounted for. The report suggested that the killings were planned with the involvement of external and domestic actors. According to the 360-page report submitted to authorities, a high-level meeting at the office of Fazle Noor Taposh, with the presence of other senior figures from Awami League, such as Sheikh Selim, Sohel Taj, and a group of 24 foreign agents, finalized the plan for the massacre. Awami League leaders Jahangir Kabir Nanak, Mirza Azam, Harun ur Rashid (also known as Leather Liton), and Torab Ali were present at several meetings to implement the plan. Colonel Shams Chowdhury, Commanding Officer of 44 Rifles Battalion, was aware of these plans and Taposh was responsible for obtaining approval for the decision from former Prime Minister Sheikh Hasina. The report claims that BDR personnel were first mobilized via covert recruitment shortly after the 2008 Bangladeshi general election, then indoctrinated and financially incentivized to carry out the violence at Pilkhana. The report also claimed that, after the mutiny began, Captain Tanvir Haider Noor informed his wife about the presence of Indian National Security Guard members in Pilkhana. His wife, Tasnuva Maha, said that she heard three men dressed in BDR uniforms talking with each other in Hindi. Multiple witnesses reported hearing conversations in Hindi, Western Bengali dialect, and unknown languages in Pilkhana that day. The commission cited various facts in the report, including hearing foreign languages, the escape of outsiders, foreign numbers in the call list, and Captain Tanvir's last conversation, as evidence of India's involvement.

== Trial of Sheikh Hasina ==
The International Crimes Tribunal-I, Bangladesh, charging former Prime Minister Sheikh Hasina, former Home Minister Asaduzzaman Khan Kamal, and former Inspector General of Bangladesh Police Chowdhury Abdullah Al-Mamun with crimes against humanity related to the government's violent suppression of protests in July and August 2024. Hasina and Kamal, who were tried in absentia, were convicted on 17 November 2025 and sentenced to death. Mamun, who had been in police custody since September 2024, was also found guilty but received a five-year prison term after cooperating with investigators and serving as a state witness.

The charges were formally submitted in June 2025 by the prosecution, led by Mohammad Tajul Islam, while court-appointed attorney Amir Hossain represented the defendants tried in absentia. The proceedings were adjudicated by a three-judge panel of the tribunal. The charges stemmed from the state's response to the 2024 protests, which international observers and human rights organisations described as among the deadliest civilian crackdowns in Bangladesh since independence.

== Assassination of Osman Hadi and subsequent violence ==
Between 18 and 20 December 2025, a series of riots, arson attacks, and political unrest occurred across Bangladesh following the assassination of Osman Hadi, the spokesperson of the Inqilab Moncho. Hadi died on 18 December after being shot six days earlier. Since the announcement of his death, violent mobs have targeted various civic and cultural institutions, including the offices of the national dailies Prothom Alo and The Daily Star, and cultural centres including Chhayanaut and Bangladesh Udichi Shilpigoshthi. Diplomatic missions of India and Awami League-related sites have also been targeted.

== 2026 general election and referendum ==
General election was held in Bangladesh on 12 February 2026 to elect members of the Jatiya Sangsad, as well as the proposed Senate. It was the first general election since the July Uprising of 2024 that ended the 15-year-long rule of Sheikh Hasina. The Bangladesh Nationalist Party (BNP), led by Tarique Rahman, won a landslide victory in the election, securing two-thirds of seats; Bangladesh Jamaat-e-Islami secured the second most seats and a constitutional referendum on the July Charter was held alongside the election.

A constitutional referendum took place in Bangladesh on 12 February 2026, alongside the general election. Voters were asked about the provisions of the July Charter and related amendments to the Constitution of Bangladesh. "July National Charter (Constitutional Amendment) Implementation Order, 2025" were issued for this purpose.

Choice	Votes	%
For	47,225,980	68.26
Against	21,960,231	31.74
Total	69,186,211	100.00
Valid votes	69,186,211	90.30
Invalid/blank votes	7,435,196	9.70
Total votes	76,621,407	100.00
Registered voters/turnout	127,711,793	60.00
Source: Prothom Alo

== Misinformation in India ==
Indian media outlets, reported the mass uprising as an Islamist-backed takeover of the country purportedly orchestrated by India's rivals, Pakistan (through its intelligence agency ISI) and China.

On 6 May 2025, a report was published in The Hindu on World Press Freedom Day, citing the Delhi-based Rights and Risk Analysis Group, claiming the interim government had targeted 640 journalists in Bangladesh in eight months. The Bangladeshi government rejected the claim as baseless, false and misleading.

== See also ==
- Timeline of the July Uprising
- History of Bangladesh
