= Bangladesh post-resignation violence (2024–2026) =

Political violence in Bangladesh

- Part of the Aftermath of the July Uprising
- Date: 5 August 2024 – 17 February 2026 (1 year, 6 months, 1 week and 5 days) 17 November 2026 – present
- Location: Bangladesh
- Caused by: Authoritarianism; Democratic backsliding; Corruption; Massacre; Awami League corruption; Mob violence; Collapse of rule of law; Islamic Extremism

Parties
Protesters
- Students Against Discrimination
- Bangladesh Nationalist Party
- Bangladesh Jamaat-e-Islami
- Other opposition groups
- Islamists & fundamentalists
- Unaffiliated anti-social elements
November 2026:
Bangladesh Nationalist Party
Jatiotabadi Swechhasebak Dal
Jatiotabadi Chatra Dal
Bangladesh Jamaat-e-Islami
Awami League
- AL-affiliated organisations & supporters
- Cabinet members & Bureaucrats
- Grand Alliance
- Pro-AL media houses
November 2026:
Awami League activists
Chhatra League activists
Jubo League activists
Minorities:
- Hindus
- Ahmadis
- Buddhists
- Christians
- Ethnic minorities
- Sufis
- Bauls
.

Casualties
- Deaths: 44 policemen (as of 18 August 2024) November 2026: 2 BNP members
- Arrested: 18,384
- Damage: 1,494 monuments & sculptures 40 Sufi graves

Following the resignation of Sheikh Hasina, the prime minister of Bangladesh, on 5 August 2024, which had come after the Hasina's government's mass killings of protesters, known as the July massacre, a wave of violent conflict took place, between protesters and opposition activists on one side, and Awami League supporters, government and security officials on the other. On the day of Hasina's resignation, 25 police officers were killed. According to the Daily Sun, at least 119, including both the students and Awami League activists, were killed that day. According to Prothom Alo, 1,494 sculptures and monuments were vandalized across Bangladesh after the resignation of Sheikh Hasina.

The violence also affected the religious minority communities. According to the Bangladesh Hindu Buddhist Christian Unity Council, there have been over 2,010 attacks on Hindus or their properties spread over 45 districts and 5 Hindus have been killed in these attacks, 2 have been confirmed as Awami League members. Ahmadiyyas in Bangladesh were also attacked by groups damaging mosques and homes. The minority ethnic groups were also attacked. Mobs attacked and vandalized five to nine private television channels. According to Transparency International Bangladesh (TIB), since 5 August 2024, BNP is involved in 91.7% violence while Awami League is with 20.7%.

== Background ==
During the 2006–2008 Bangladeshi political crisis, Sheikh Hasina was detained on extortion charges. After she was released from jail, she won the 2008 general election. In 2014, she was re-elected for a third term in an election that was boycotted by the BNP and criticised by international observers. In 2017, after nearly a million Rohingya entered the country, fleeing from genocide in Myanmar, Hasina received credit and praise for giving them refuge and assistance. She won a fourth and a fifth term after the 2018 and 2024 elections, which was marred by violence and widely criticized as being fraudulent.

It is widely believed that Bangladesh experienced democratic backsliding under her premiership. Human Rights Watch documented widespread enforced disappearances and extrajudicial killings under her government. Numerous politicians and journalists were systematically and judicially punished for challenging her views.

The July Uprising, was a series of anti-government and pro-democracy protests in Bangladesh, spearheaded primarily by university students. Initially focused on restructuring quota-based systems for government job recruitment, the movement expanded against what many perceive as an authoritarian government when hundreds of protestors and civilians, most of whom were students, were killed in the July massacre. Amnesty International characterized the event as "the deadliest crackdown against protesters in the country's post-independence history", and UN Human Rights Chief Volker Türk said "the attacks on student protesters are particularly shocking and unacceptable." The majority of the fatalities were caused by gunshots fired by the police and other government forces, using lethal and deadly weapons, against unarmed protestors and non-protesting civilians, including children and pedestrians.

Hasina resigned on 5 August 2024, as large crowds of demonstrators surrounded the prime minister's residence. Her resignation was announced by Waker-uz-Zaman, the Chief of the Army Staff. Later that day, Hasina fled to India in a chaotic departure, first by car, then by helicopter, and finally by plane. She left no written resignation letter and gave no resignation speech.

== Arts and cultural sites ==
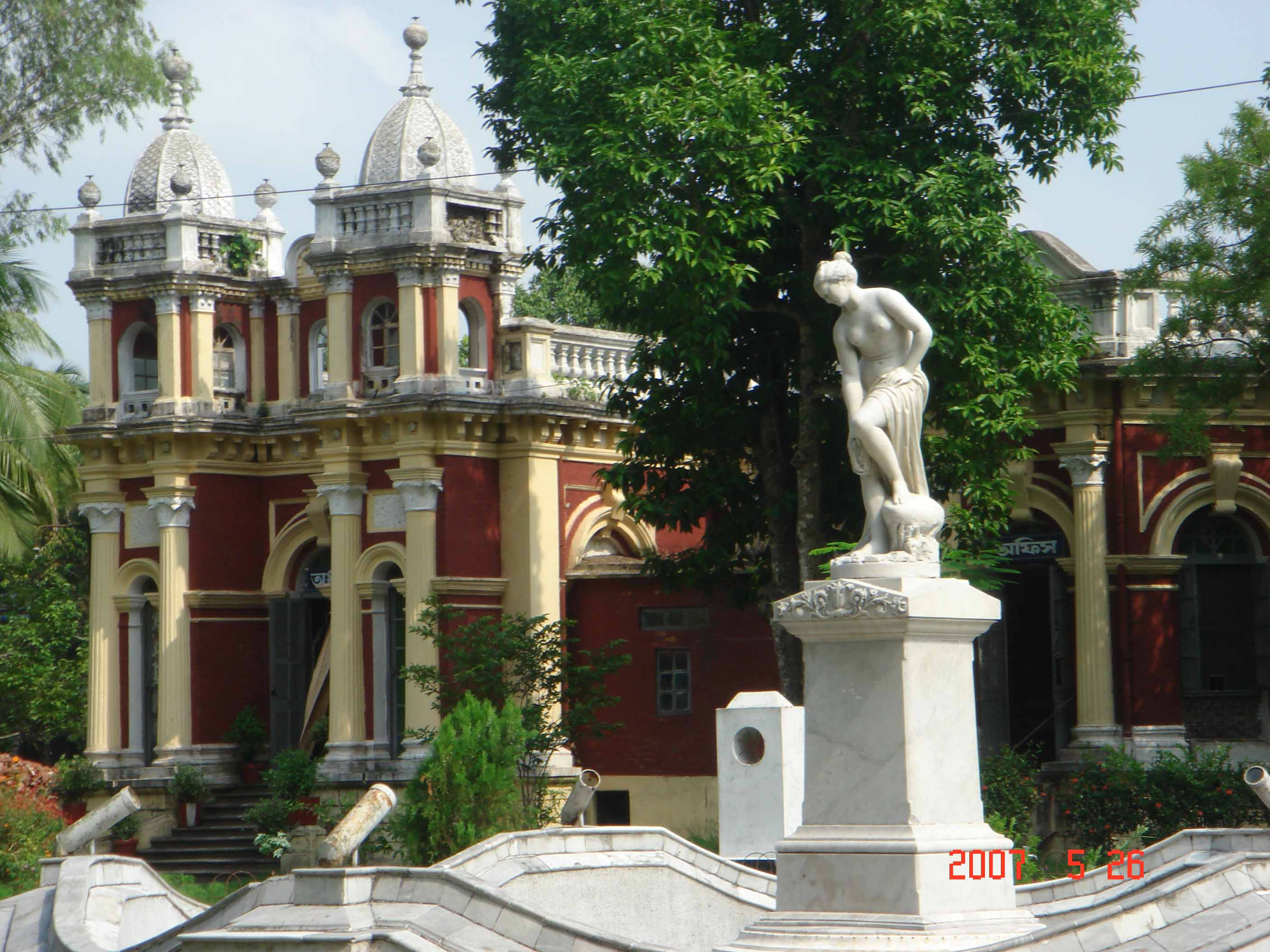
Venus sculpture in Shashi Lodge (Mymensingh) was destroyed.

On 5 August, the 140-year old home of Baul singer Rahul Ananda in Dhanmondi locality of the capital city of Dhaka was torched along with 3,000 handmade musical instruments due to the fire set on Bangabandhu Memorial Museum near the home by agitated people shortly after resignation of Sheikh Hasina. The statue of lady justice at the Supreme Court of Bangladesh, source of the Bangladesh Statue of Justice controversy, was completely destroyed. Statue of Sheikh Mujibur Rahman at Bijoy Sarani was destroyed. National Sculpture Gallery was looted and illegally occupied on 5 August. A statue of Sheikh Russel, youngest son of Sheikh Mujib, was vandalized along with a mural of Sheikh Mujibur Rahman. Sculptures at Mujibnagar Memorial were vandalized. The Venus statue, built more than 200 years ago, at Shashi Lodge was destroyed.

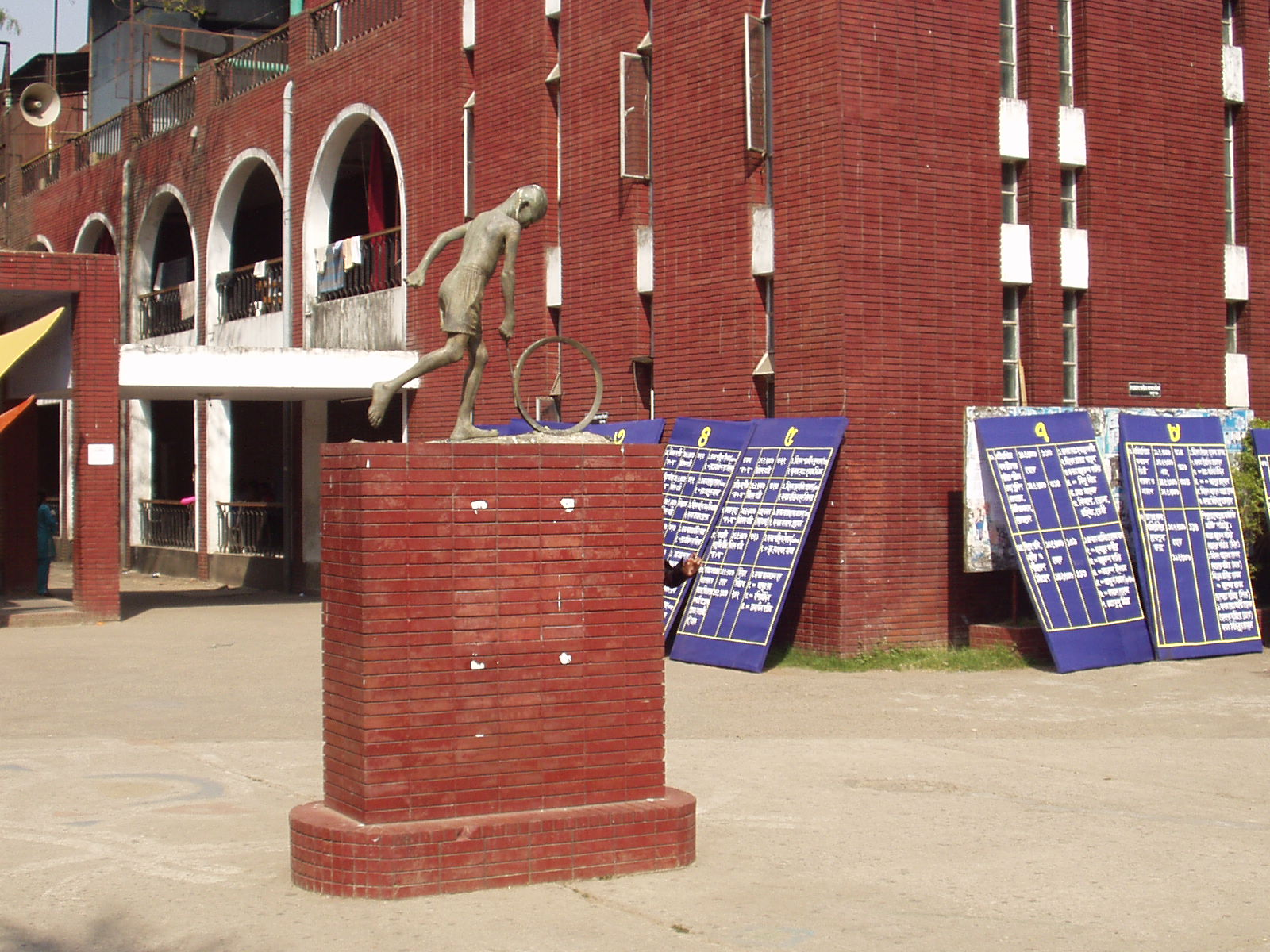
Duronto, sculpture of a playing child, at Bangladesh Shishu Academy was vandalized.

Abahani Limited Dhaka, one of the country's largest sports clubs, lost nearly 500 trophies to mob attacks on 5 August 2025. The club's newly built office was shattered, and the furniture was completely demolished. Similar attacks also took place in the office of Sheikh Jamal Dhanmondi Club

Star Cineplex branch in Rajshahi was looted and vandalized. The Independence Museum at Suhrawardy Udyan in Dhaka was vandalized. The Indira Gandhi Cultural Center, an institution of the Indian High Commission to Bangladesh, was vandalized and burned down.

In November 2024, an annual event commemorating the reputed Baul mystic Lalon Fakir, was cancelled at Narayanganj Sadar Upazila of Narayanganj due to violent intimidation by members of the Hefazat-e-Islam, on grounds of music being prohibited in Islam. A similar event commemorating Lalon at Tangail's Madhupur Upazila was also forcibly cancelled by Hefazat-e-Islam on similar grounds in February 2025. Basanta Utsab celebrations at Dhaka's Uttara was cancelled due to threats from Islamists.

On 21st February 2025, a replica of the Shaheed Minar, Dhaka was vandalised by unknown miscreants at Chauddagram Upazila of Comilla District.

In June 2025, a section of the Shahjadpur Kachharibari was vandalised by an enraged mob, causing the site to be closed indefinitely to outsiders.

== Awami League ==
The residences and offices of members of parliament and ministers was vandalized and burned down by the mob. (Note: Ragebul Ahsan Ripu, Md. Mujibur Rahman Majnu, R. A. M. Obaidul Muktadir Chowdhury, Anisul Haque, Golam Sarwar Tuku, Zaheed Farooque, former mayor of Barisal Serniabat Sadiq Abdullah Amir Hossain Amu Dipu Moni, Mohammad Abdul Wadud, Chanuar Hossain Chanu, Habibur Rahman Habib, President of Sylhet District Shafiqur Rahaman Chowdhury, Ushwe Sing, Solaiman Haque Joarder, Md. Ali Azgar, A. K. M. Bahauddin, Mashrafe Bin Mortaza, Asaduzzaman Khan, Iqbalur Rahim, Zunaid Ahmed Palak, Shajahan Khan, AFM Bahauddin Nasim, Farhad Hossain, Sadhan Chandra Majumder, Nizam Uddin Jalil John, Nuruddin Chowdhury Noyon, Feroz Ahammed Shapon and Soto Monir.)

The Awami League office at Raiganj Upazila was burned down and some ran to the press club where they were assaulted. Mobs attacked, looted, and burned down the homes of Alauddin Ahmed Chowdhury and Nizam Uddin Hazari. The office of Shusen Chandra Sheel, chairman of Feni Sadar Upazila Parishad, and the houses of Amir Hossain Bahar and Md Manik, Feni municipality councilors, were looted and burned down. Cars parked near or at the budlings were also destroyed. The home of Md. Abu Zahir, member of parliament, was burned to the ground after a mob laid seize to it for four hours. The office Baksiganj Upazila unit of Awami League was burned down. The car of the chairman of Bagarchar union parishad was burned down. The residence of Mirza Azam, member of parliament and former Minister, was vandalized. A car owned by the Awami League organizing secretary of Pabna Sadar Upazila unit, Abu Sayeed, was burned down. An office of the Jubo League near Bulbul College was burned down. Protestors set fire to 36 motorcycles throughout the day. Awami League men set fire to the Bangladesh Nationalist Party office. The home of Shamsul Hoque Tuku, deputy speaker of parliament, was vandalized. The home of Hosne Ara, a Member of Parliament, was burned and looted during the violence.

Following the resignation 11 people were killed in Comilla including six who were burned to death after the residence of Md. Shah Alam, a former councilor, was burned down. Five of the dead were from ages 12 to 17. Four people died after the home of Shafiqul Islam Shimul, member of parliament, was burned down. The mob also set fire to his brother's house and his former residence.

Two Jubo League leaders were murdered in Bogra District. A Chattra League activist was killed after refusing to pay extortionists on 17 August in Gournadi Upazila. Salim Khan, Chairman of Lakshmipur Model Union Parishad, and his son, actor Shanto Khan, were killed by a mob. A UP chairman of Anwara Upazila was assaulted and chased from his office on 18 August. The Sayeman Beach Resort was vandalized Cox's Bazar District. The chairman of Bochaganj Upazila Parishad Afsar Ali went to file a case about his house being vandalized instead he was forced to resign by students and arrested by the police. The Faridpur District offices of Awami League and Chhatra League were vandalized. Two members of Jubo League were killed in Feni District. Jessore District Awami League office was vandalized. The Awami League office in Nilphamari town was vandalized. Awami League men attacked the office of Alamgir Sarder, President of Nilphamari District unit of Bangladesh Nationalist Party.

The home of Mohit Ur Rahman Shanto, member of parliament for Mymensingh-4, was vandalized. The home of Subash Chandra Bose, President of Narail District Awami League was vandalized. The Narail District Awami League office was burned down. The residence of Nizam Uddin Khan Nilu, General Secretary of Narail District Awami League, was burned down. The homes of Shamim Osman and Salim Osman was attacked and burned down.

Talimul Islam Khan, Ganganandpur union parshad member was burned alive in Jhikargacha Upazila after his house was barricaded and set on fire. His wife and three-year-old child were injured in the fire. Hiron, chairman of Porahati Union Parishad and his chauffeur, Asad, were beaten to death and their bodies hung from a statue. The house of Jewel Hossain, a local leader of the Awami League in Jhenaidah, was burned down killing two people inside. In Khulna, the home of Sheikh Helal Uddin and Sheikh Salahuddin Jewel, both members of parliament and relatives of Prime Minister Sheikh Hasina, were vandalized and burned down. The Khulna District Awami League office and the office of the Khulna District magistrate was vandalized. The residence of Asaduzzaman Noor was vandalized. The residence of Rezia Islam, women member of parliament, was burned down along with two of her vehicles. The home of Naimuzzaman Bhuiyan, member of parliament, was vandalized. The home of Mayor Zakia Khatun of Panchagarh Municipality was burned down along with former chairman Amirul Islam and former councilor Shafiqul Islam.

Koyra Upazila chairman GM Mohsin Reza, his bodyguard, and chauffeur were beaten to death by a mob. His house was burned down. The homes of Monnujan Sufian, former Minister, and SM Kamal Hossain, member of parliament, were vandalized. An Awami League office and a police box was vandalized near Saddam Bazar intersection in Kushtia. The home of Suman Khan, Joint General Secretary of Lalmonirhat District Awami League was burned down killing six people inside. The Magura District Awami League office and DC office were vandalized. Awami League men also vandalized the district Bangladesh Nationalist Party office. The Thakurgaon District Awami League office was burned down and several stores nearby were vandalized.

Bangabandhu Memorial Museum was burned to the ground. The office of Dhaka District Awami League in Tejgaon, and the office of the chairperson of Awami League in Dhanmondi were burned down. The personal residence of Sheikh Hasina, Sudha Sadan, was burned down. On 15 August, anniversary of the murder of former President Sheikh Mujibur Rahman and most of his family, mourners were prevented from reaching Bangabandhu Memorial Museum. They were assaulted on the streets, and the car of Abdul Kader Siddique was vandalized. The mob was checking the ID cards and cell phones of pedestrians. One of the mob was a lecturer at the Alhaz Mokbul Hossain College, Abu Sufiyan, who said he was there to protect the "Independence" and another was the Bangladesh Jatiotabadi Chatra Dal activist who was dancing to Hindi music. Some Awami activists and others were detained by the mob and handed over to the police who released them as there were no specific allegations against them. Rokeya Prachy was assaulted at the site when she went to pay her respects. The violence caused death of one and over a hundred were reported to be hospitalised.

A Jubo League leader, Monirul Islam Shaheen, was beaten to death. The chairman and vice-chairman of Bauphal Upazila Parishad were assaulted and forced to flee their office on 18 August. The Awami League office in Rajshahi was vandalized. On 18 August, a Chhatra League activist was tied to a tree for two hours and handed over to Bangladesh Army when he tried to enter his dorm room at the University of Rajshahi. A mob attacked the residence of the former chairman of Pratapnagar Union Parishad, Zakir Hossain, in which two people from the mob, Hossain, and another local Awami League leader was killed in Satkhira District. A leader of Swechchhasebak League was murdered on 8 August. A car owned by Zuaryer Islam, General Secretary of Tangail District Awami League was vandalized.

=== November 2026 resurgence ===
On 16 November, Around ten people are injured, several requiring hospitalization, in East London, United Kingdom, when banned Awami League activists allegedly attack Bangladeshi expatriates and students with glass bottles and steel rods outside a reception for National Citizen Party convener Nahid Islam and the 11 Party Alliance.

On 17 November 2026, following the arrest of party leaders, Awami League and Chhatra League activists mobilize via mosque loudspeakers to storm and burn a police station in Tungipara, Gopalganj District, Bangladesh. Amid police tear gas and rubber bullet fire, the attackers free detainees, loot firearms, burn Bangladesh Nationalist Party MP S M Jilani's residence of Gopalganj-3, and blockade local roads. In retalition, in Comilla, membres of the Swechhasebak Dal burn the local Awami League office and former MP AKM Bahauddin Bahar's residence in retaliation for the attack on S M Jilani's home.

On 18 November 2026, two BNP members were killed when suspected Awami League members attacked a motorcycle procession in Kalia, Narail District. A crowd allegedly led by Chatra Dal members storms and sets fire to the residence of former Awami League MP Shamim Osman in Fatullah, Narayanganj District, while unidentified attackers in Nazirpur, Pirojpur District, loot and set fire to two houses belonging to former Minister of Fisheries and Livestock and Awami League leader SM Rezaul Karim, and a crowd in Sirajganj vandalises the local Awami League office and the residence of former MP Muhammad Habibe Millat. Gopalganj District, , armed members of the banned Awami League, Chhatra League, and Jubo League detonate crude bombs and set fire to a private clinic owned by BNP Member of Parliament K M Babar of Gopalganj-2, forcing patients to evacuate. Attackers also burn at least five BNP offices across Muksudpur and Kashiani and target two Grameen Bank branches.

On 19 November 2026, Muksudpur, Gopalganj District, members of the banned Awami League loot and set fire to the ancestral home of BNP MP Md. Selimuzzaman Mollah, several supporters houses, an unoccupied police station along with several parked vehicles, and a Grameen Bank branch, while attackers in Kashiani vandalise residences and businesses linked to BNP and Jamaat-e-Islami leaders and throw bricks at Border Guard Bangladesh and Special Response Battalion vehicles. Separately, armed attackers loot and set fire to the ancestral home and three trucks of jailed former politician Rahim Ullah in Sonagazi, Feni District, while attackers set fire to the residence of former Minister of State for Foreign Affairs Shahriar Alam in Bagha, Rajshahi District.

== Other political parties ==
The headquarters of the Jatiya Party (Ershad) in Dhaka was burned down by an angry mob in October 2024. Leaders of the other Grand Alliance (Bangladesh) aligned with the Awami League have gone underground out of fear of mob justice.

The main opposition party, the Bangladesh Nationalist Party has been accused of sheltering gangs & extortion rackets that had been previously patronised by the Awami League. In July 2025, in Dhaka's Chowkbazar area, a local trader named Chand Mia was brutally assaulted & beaten to death in broad daylight by members of the Jubo Dal & Chatra Dal for his refusal to give in to extortion.

On 16 July 2025, NCP's rally venue in Gopalganj (the hometown of Sheikh Hasina) was attacked by Awami League supporters. Clashes between law enforcements and Awami League supporters resulted in four deaths.

=== Clashes between BNP and Jamaat-e-Islami ===
On 11 August, Rabiul Islam Nayan, Dhaka City North Unit member secretary of the Jatiyabadi Jubo Dal which is the youth front of BNP was put on allegation of leading a mob to Islami Bank's main branch in Motijheel to establish control over the first sharia based bank in Bangladesh and sparked tensions.

On 26 August, after the July uprising, the two opposition parties which had been in alliance since 1991 general elections have been drifting away from their ties after the Jamaat chief Shafiqur Rahman's disparaging comments about the BNP. BNP's attempts to distance itself from the Jamaat is also seen as an attempt by itself to win international support. In an interview given to the Bangladeshi English newspaper The Daily Star, BNP's Mirza Fakhrul Islam Alamgir stated on 30 August 2024

The alliance we had with the Jamaat had become dysfunctional long ago. But we were carrying out our anti-government campaigns simultaneously on the basis of mutual consultations. That was how we conducted our campaigns till the fall of the previous regime. Since then, we have been in touch with other parties considering that the interim government is in power and there will be an election soon. Hence an overall political compact is necessary. But at the moment we are not in an alliance.

— Mirza Fakhrul Islam Alamgir

Observers note that the unprecedented hostilities between the 2 long-time allies broke out over the issue of holding elections to the new Parliament & implementation of reforms. The Jamaat wants to hold a delayed election, which would benefit it & other Islamist outfits by directing the prevailing anti-Awami League sentiment against secularism through galvanization of anti-Indian sentiments & mobilization of support from the conservatives over the ongoing Gaza war, with the aim of creating an Islamic state based on sharia. The BNP wants early elections, as it wants to ensure its leader Khaleda Zia can return to campaign for the election after receiving medical treatment abroad (which had been denied by Hasina), alongside her son Tarique Rahman, who had been political exile in London since his conviction in the 2004 Dhaka grenade attack. This later spilled out into the Jamaat's student wing, the Bangladesh Islami Chhatra Shibir trying to undermine the influence of BNP's student wing, the Bangladesh Jatiotabadi Chatradal, in the country's higher educational institutions.

On 9 October 2024, TCB (Trading Corporation of Bangladesh) cards in Ishwardi, Pabna, 8 were injured after gunfire and clashes between the BNP and Jamaat activists.

On 14 November 2024, over the dispute over building of a shop house, 10 people were injured in a clash between in Bogra District.

On 20 November 2024, 15 people were injured over the dispute of the vacant acting chairman position in Mohdipur union parishad in Gaibandha.

On 21 December 2024, at least 10 people were injured in clashes in Saghata between BNP & Jamaat leaders, several bikes were set on blaze.

On 6 January 2025, 3 were injured as of clashes over the contract of sand supplies in front of Zorargonj police station.

On 7 January, the union office of Jamaat-e-Islami and 6 shops of their supporters were locked after a conflict earlier yesterday, the BNP convener later resolved the issue and mentioned the event as saddening.

On 12 January, a major clash in Kushtia leaves almost 25 injured which was due to a dispute over the election of the president of the Burapara Miton Secondary School managing committee in Mirpur Upazila between Mokhlesur Rahman Mukul, the Amir of the Jamaat in Amla Union, and local BNP leader Rashed Mahmud Nasir.

On 20 March 2025, a violence erupted between the student wing of the two parties in the Bausa union of Rajshahi, over an alleged corruption in the VGD (Vulnerable Group Development) cards. Both of the parties blamed each other for sparking the conflict.

On 15 May 2025, clashes broke out in Pabna between the two parties over the post of guardian member of Debottar Degree College in Atgharia upazila. Leaving at least 5 people wounded. The next day, protests regarding the incident were rallied out. The Jamat alleged Bnp of burning the Qur'an whereas Bnp and jamat both filled cases against alleged perpetrators of vandalism against their party members respectively

On 17 May, clashes broke out in Jagannathpur Union between JeI and BNP after a dispute over the opening of a 150 year old traditional fair "Gazi Kalu-Champabati Mela" which was later closed by the Kumarkhali Police. Several people were injured.

On 5 June, a local Jamat-e-Islami activist Kausar Ahmed was allegedly beaten by Bangladesh Jatiotabadi Jubodal members in Lakshmipur. Police and relatives of the deceased said that a fight broke out over a previous dispute with three Jubodal members. Local Jamat leaders protested, demanding arrest. However, Laxmipur Jubodal denied claiming the latter was Awami League member.

On 14 June, a protest rally of Bangladesh Jamaat-e-Islami was allegedly attacked by Bangladesh Nationalist Party members, 5 people were injured in the clashes.

== Business ==
Factories owned by Beximco Group, Ha-meem Group, and Bengal Group were targets of arson attack. In Dhaka, a showroom of Yellow, subsidiary of Beximco Group, was burned down. A textile mill was burned down in Gazipur. Zabeer International Hotel, owned by Awami League member of parliament Shahin Chakladar, was vandalized and burned to the ground. Bangladesh Air Force rescued a few people from the rooftop but 24 people died in fire. An Indonesian national was also among the dead.

The Afil Jute Weaving Mills, owned by member of parliament and owner of Akij Group, Sheikh Afil Uddin, was vandalized on 18 August. The jute officials blamed Bangladesh Nationalist Party activists but this was denied by local party leaders.

A business owned by the general secretary of Manikganj municipal Awami League unit, Zahidul Islam, was vandalized.

In February 2025, a book stall in the Amar Ekushey Bookfair was vandalised by a group of madrasa students, who also physically assaulted the publisher on spot for selling books authored by Taslima Nasrin. A similar incident of vandalism occurred at a stall set up by the Bangladesh Udichi Shilpigoshthi in a local bookfair at Satkhira District.

== Government ==
Dupchachia UNO and AC Land offices were vandalized in Bogra District. A Bangladesh Nationalist Party leader led the attack on Betagi Municipal Office. Haziganj municipality office was vandalized and a number of cars and bikes parked there were set on fire. The Rajshahi City Corporation office and home of the mayor were burned down. The Gosairhat Municipal office was vandalized and the mayor Abdul Awal was assaulted on 19 August. Mobs also burned down the Tangail municipal building and Tangail District Awami League office. The Tangail Sadar Upazila Nirbahi Officer's office was vandalized.

The vehicle weigh scale on Dhaka-Chittagong highway at Sitakunda was attacked from a victory procession after the resignation of Sheikh Hasina. The Narayanganj DC office was vandalized and an arson attack took place on an amusement park owned by the government. The Niphamari Sadar Upazila parishad office was vandalized and 15 bikes were destroyed in arson attacks.

== Religious sites ==
Scattered incidents of desecration of tombs of Sufi saints by Islamists affiliated to Deobandi organisations occurred at various places, most notably in Gulistan of Dhaka, Bandar and Sonargaon in Narayanganj, Kazipur in Sirajganj and Ranishankail in Thakurgaon. The urs celebration of Shah Paran was curtailed in Sylhet due to threats. According to the police department's report, 44 attacks occurred at 40 shrines in the five months following August 4.

== Minorities ==
An Ahmadiya mosque at Dhaka's Madartek locality was vandalized. Ahmadiyas were attacked in Choraikhola in Nilphamari District. A mob destroyed 80 homes and a mosque of the Ahamadiya community in Ahmednagar, Panchagarh District. Ahmadiya Muslim community were attacked in Bamrail. The house of a Kurukh family, was set on fire in Dhawakandar village of Gomastapur upazila of Chapainawabganj. The miscreants vandalized their homesteads, set fire and cut down their mango orchards and threatened to grab the land. At least a hundred houses of Chakmas at Dighinala Upazila of Khagracchari were torched by Bengali Muslims settlers. Due to this incident, the Buddhist community decided not to publicly observe the Kaṭhina festival that year. Christians were targeted & driven out of villages by mobs, who then attacked & looted their properties & churches in Dhamoirhat Upazila & a church in Dhaka was set on fire. Houses of Santhal Christian converts in Dinajpur district were similarly plundered alongside a church in Narayanganj District. In Khulna, the offices of Caritas Bangladesh was vandalised by local Muslims. Reports of Christian converts, especially those from Bengali Muslim families being killed & violently intimidated by armed mobs throughout the countryside have also appeared. It must also be noted that there was already a simmering discontent against Christians in the country caused by Hasina alleging tribal converts in Chittagong Hill Tracts planning to secede from the country with the aim to create a Christian state a few days before her resignation. In November 2024, St. Gregory's High School and College, a Catholic educational institution in Dhaka was vandalised by an enraged Muslim mob. On Christmas Eve 2024, houses of 17 Tripuri Christian converts were ransacked & burnt down at Lama Upazila of Bandarban District in Chittagong Hill Tracts by Bengali Muslim vandals. Protests erupted in Chattagram city over revelation of the local police trying to cover-up the gangrape of a Tripuri girl in Khagracchari Sadar upazila by Bengali Muslims affiliated with the BNP, which reportedly occurred on 27 June 2025.

Hindus faced a large number of attacks, arising out of alienation of Hindus by all other major parties, all of which had a history of inciting communal riots against them (in 1990 by the Jatiya Party, in 2001 & 2013 by the BNP & its support to a similar nationwide riots by the Jamaat-e-Islami in 2014). However, nationwide anti-Hindu riots in 2021 were said to have been orchestrated by the Chhatra League. During the protests, Islamist organisations incited anti-Hindu rhetoric, citing Indian involvement in repressing the protests. The OHCHR report described the violence against Hindus to be motivated by "religious & ethnic discrimination, revenge against Awami League supporters, local communal disputes over land & interpersonal issues."

A Hindu Idol at Dhaka College hostel was destroyed. The house of the President of Mohanpur Upazila Puja Udyapan Parishad Suranjit Sarkar was vandalized following which he fled to India. A house of a Hindu shopkeeper was vandalized in Hatra village. A Hindu councillor, Kajal Roy, from Rangpur was killed in the violent protest. On 5 August, a Hindu temple in Shariatpur town was looted and vandalized. Local Hindu families were rescued by Bangladesh Army.

On August 5, 2024, the house of renowned Bangladeshi folk musician Rahul Ananda was vandalized, looted, and set ablaze by a violent mob in Dhaka's Dhanmondi area. The mob also looted or destroyed over 3,000 musical instruments, and musician Rahul Ananda had to flee with his family to save themselves. On 6 August, retired school teacher Mrinal Kanti Chatterjee was killed while his wife and daughter were injured at their home in Bagerhat Sadar Upazila.

According to Prothom Alo, 1,068 houses and business establishments of minorities are attacked from 5 to 20 August. Outside of that, 22 houses of worship came under attack. The Bangladesh Hindu Buddhist Christian Unity Council reported that from August 4 to August 20, a total of 2,010 incidents (including 69 temples) of communal violence took place across the country within this 16-day period. Among the incidents, 157 families had their homes ransacked, looted, and set on fire, with their businesses also being destroyed.

In October 2024, despite heavy security & deployment of armed personnel, scattered incidents of idol desecration & violent intimidation of Hindus occurred in various parts of the country during Durga Puja festivities in an attempt to jeopardize the observance of the most important Hindu festival in the country.

A new wave of anti-Hindu violence spread throughout the country by the end of 2024, after arrested ISKCON leader Chinmoy Krishna Das's supporters killed advocate Saiful Islam Alif. Hefazat-e-Islam demanded a ban on ISKCON.

After the visit of India's foreign secretary on 9 December 2024, the interim government stated that it had arrested 77 people in connection to 88 cases registered for violence against Hindus. Indian Minister of External Affairs (MoS), Kirti Vardhan Singh stated in the Lok Sabha that between 26 November 2024 & 25 January 2025, 76 incidents of anti-Hindu violence have taken place. Since Hasina's resignation, 23 Hindus were killed and 152 Hindu temples had been desecrated; the government issued a statement denying that the violence was communal in nature.

On 20 February 2025, a passenger bus travelling from Dhaka to Rajshahi was attacked by highwaymen at the intersection of Gazipur district & Tangail district. Some reports stated that a 20 year old Hindu woman was raped by the goons on the spot, while others state that she was only sexually assaulted by the robbers attempting to snatch her jewellery.

On the night of 18 April 2025, Bhabesh Chandra Roy, a local Hindu community leader was abducted and killed by unidentified assailants at his native village at Birganj Upazila in Dinajpur district.

== Media ==
The office of Shyamal Dutta of the Jatiya Press Club, National Press Club of Bangladesh, was vandalized and he was prevented from leaving Bangladesh. Group of mobs looted and vandalized the offices of ATN Bangla and ATN News forcing them to stop transmission. A mob also attacked the offices of Ekattor TV, Independent Television, and Somoy TV. Gaan Bangla TV was also vandalized. The office of the president and general secretary of the Jatiya Press Club was vandalized and forcefully occupied after Abdul Hannan Masud of quota movement demanded their resignation and banning Awami League supporting journalists from the profession. On 18 August 2024, the offices of Kaler Kantho and Radio Capital were vandalized at the East West Media Group compound. About 25 vehicles in the media compound were damaged.

On 14 August 2024, the Chittagong Press Club was attacked and vandalized injuring 20 journalists. The attack was led by Aminul Islam, an affiliate of the Bangladesh Nationalist Party politician Mir Mohammad Nashir Uddin, Sarwar Alam, health secretary of Chittagong City unit of the Bangladesh Nationalist Party, and Alamgir Noor, Bangladesh Jatiotabadi Jubo Dal activist. Chattogram Union of Journalists protested the attack and the attack on the home of Hossain Toufiq Iftekhar, editor of the Daily Chattogram.

A mob led by ATM Akram Hossain Talim, Bangladesh Nationalist Party politician, vandalized Bagerhat Press Club. Another Bangladesh Nationalist Party politician, Fakir Tariqul Islam, vandalized the office of the chairman of Bagerhat Sadar Upazila. The home of journalist Ibrahim Khalil in Cox's Bazar District was vandalized on 5 August. The home of Jawad Nirjhar, a journalist, was vandalized in Magura District. Moniruzzaman Monir, President of Raipura Upazila press club and correspondent of Desh Rupantar, was shot after being physically assaulted on 13 August. The home of Sanjit Saha, a journalist, in Chatmahar was vandalized. On 8 May 2025, a local media outlet's office in Khulna was torched on fire for mistakenly publishing pro-Awami League narrative.

== Law enforcement ==
A mob attacked Uttara East Police Station, prompting police to open fire, killing 10 people. A team of Bangladesh Army went to rescue the police officers stuck at the police station but failed as the officers did not trust the army. In Dhaka, police stations of Badda, Jatrabari, Khilgaon, Mohammadpur, Rampura, Tejgaon Industrial Area, and Uttara East were attacked and many were set on fire. Kallyanpur deputy commissioner's office was burned down. According to Dhaka Metropolitan Police, the majority of the police stations under the commission were vandalized, looted, or set on fire. In Nikunja, the house of the son of the former commissioner of Dhaka Metropolitan Police, Asaduzzaman Mia, was vandalized. Bangladesh Police Association went on a strike following the attacks.

A student, Shahadat, and police officer, Harun-ar Rashid, were killed in Chandpur District. The Rapid Action Battalion's headquarters were attacked by a mob and the unit responded by firing at the crowd. Five separate police stations in Feni, Feni Municipal Building, and the office of Mayor Nazrul Islam Swapan Miyaji were burned down. In Gazipur, there was an attempted jail break of terrorists from Kashimpur Central Jail. The Bangladesh Ansar-VDP Academy was attacked by a mob in which two died after Ansar fired at the mob. Six people died in a clash with Border Guard Bangladesh. The home of Biplob Kumar Sarker, joint commissioner of Dhaka Metropolitan Police, was vandalized.

The official residence of the Chief Justice of Bangladesh was vandalized extensively. The residence of Tureen Afroz, former prosecutor of International Crimes Tribunal, was attacked in Uttara by Islamists. The attackers physically assaulted her and shaved her head as punishment for not wearing hijab. The personal office of Tureen Afroz was vandalized in Nilphamari District. Kushtia Model Police Station and Kushtia Police Superintendent's Office were attacked in which the police fired shots at the mob. The headquarters of Rajshahi Metropolitan Police was burned down.

== Sports ==
Sheikh Jamal Dhanmondi Club was vandalized. Abahani Limited Dhaka was looted and vandalized. The residence of Nazmul Hassan, President of Bangladesh Cricket Board, was vandalized. The Narayanganj Rifles' Club was burned down.

In January 2025, the venue of a local women's football match at Akkelpur Upazila of Joypurhat District was vandalised by an enraged mob of Muslim men, who claimed that Muslim women's participation in sports was un-Islamic. A similar incident of women's football tournament being halted by Islamist vandals occurred at Hakimpur upazila of Dinajpur district.

== Misinformation ==
In January 2025, two Jubo League local leaders carried out a showdown after posts rumouring the resignation of the chief adviser circulated on Facebook.

In September 2024, the Bangladesh Hindu Buddhist Christian Unity Council said that the deaths of 9 Hindu men were motivated by anti-Hindu sentiment. An investigation carried out by Netra News claimed that the killings were not motivated by religious reasons. The Bangladesh Hindu Buddhist Christian Unity Council also appealed to the Bangladesh government to investigate the deaths of 23 individuals, labelling these as minority persecution. Chief adviser's deputy press secretary, Abul Kalam Azad Majumder refuted this. He claimed that out of 22 deaths seven were robbery and theft, four related to personal affairs, three were general crimes like rape, death due to heavy drinking, one from fights between two parties over sarcastic remarks, two due to accidents, two due to business rivalry, one due to clashes with locals, one due to a land dispute, and one suicide. On 18 April 2025, The Daily Star published an article stating that Bhabesh Chandra Roy a local Hindu leader had been killed but later retracted it and apologised.

Indian media outlets also carried misleading reports on minority persecution in Bangladesh post Hasina's resignation. For instance, Lal Chand Sohag, a scaper hacked to death by members of the Jubo Dal and Chatra Dal in July 2025, was reported to be a Hindu by Indian media outlets such as NDTV and India Today. Sohag was actually a Muslim. India Today also published an article bout an impending military coup in Bangladesh. The Bangladesh Army later refuted these reports.

== Government response ==
The Interim government on 8 February 2025 launched "Operation Devil Hunt" to quell the violence. Interim government advisor Retired General Jahangir Alam Chowdhury stated that the operation will continue until the "devils are rooted out".

What does 'devil' mean? It refers to evil forces. The operation will target those who attempt to destabilise the country, break the law, and engage in criminal activities.

— Jahangir Alam Chowdhury

The interim government issued an order that provided immunity to actions of protestors from 15 July to 8 August 2024.
