= Sherin Ahmed =

Bangladeshi politician

- শিরীন আহমেদ

Member of the Bangladesh Parliament for Reserved Women's Seat-1
- In office 20 February 2019 – 29 January 2024
- Succeeded by: Rezia Islam

Personal details
- Born: 2 August 1956 (age 69)
- Party: Bangladesh Awami League
- Spouse: Bazlur Rahman

Sherin Ahmed (born 2 August 1956) is a Bangladeshi politician and a former Jatiya Sangsad member. She is a politician of Bangladesh Awami League. She retired from government service. She was married to the renowned politician Bazlur Rahman, who had been a close associate of Bangabandhu Sheikh Mujibur Rahman and Political Liaison officer to Prime Minister Sheikh Hasina.

== Political life ==
She had been actively participating in political activities of Bangladesh Awami League and she also currently in charge of Bangabndhu Soinik League, which was founded by her late husband Bazlur Rahman. She said in a meeting recently that, "Bangladesh will be free from stigma if Bangabandhu's killers are tried".
