= OHCHR report on 2024 protests in Bangladesh =

2025 United Nations report

OHCHR Fact-Finding Report: Human Rights Violations and Abuses related to the Protests of July and August 2024 in Bangladesh

- Cover of the report, featuring a graffiti of Golam Nafiz
- Presented: 12 February 2025
- Commissioned by: Office of the United Nations High Commissioner for Human Rights
- Subject: Human rights in the People's Republic of Bangladesh during the July Uprising

Official website
- Report website

The OHCHR Fact-Finding Report: Human Rights Violations and Abuses related to the Protests of July and August 2024 in Bangladesh was prepared by the United Nations fact-finding mission team on Bangladesh. It is the result of an independent investigation by Office of the High Commissioner for Human Rights (OHCHR) into human rights violations that occurred in the country between 1 July and 15 August 2024. The investigation focused on the government's handling of the July Uprising during this period, including allegations of extrajudicial killings, arbitrary arrests, detention and torture and the suppression of free speech. The mission sought to gather facts, identify responsible parties and propose recommendations to prevent future violations.

== Background ==
In the summer of 2024, Bangladesh experienced a wave of student protests demanding political reforms, better economic opportunities, and broader civil liberties. These protests grew significantly from July through mid-August and led to large-scale confrontations with security forces. The government's response to the protests included the deployment of police and military units, which led to violent clashes. Over 1,400 people were reported to have died as a result of the violence during this period, with numerous others injured, detained, or subjected to mistreatment. The violence, combined with reports of human rights abuses, prompted both domestic and international calls for an independent investigation into the events. In response, the interim government of Bangladesh, led by chief adviser Muhammad Yunus, requested the United Nations to send a fact-finding team to investigate the situation. The Office of the United Nations High Commissioner for Human Rights formed the fact-finding team to determine the scope of the violations and to provide an independent and impartial assessment of the events.

== Objectives ==
The primary objectives of the OHCHR Fact-Finding Team was to establish the facts regarding the human rights violations that occurred between July and August 2024. This involved collecting evidence from various sources, including direct testimonies from victims and witnesses, documents, photographs, and videos that were not publicly available. The team also sought to identify responsibilities for the abuses, including whether any government officials, security forces, or other groups were responsible for violations of international human rights law.

Another objective was to analyse the root causes of the violence, particularly the political, social, and economic factors that contributed to the unrest. The mission sought to determine whether the violence was a result of systemic repression or specific actions taken by the government or law enforcement. Furthermore, the team aimed to provide concrete recommendations to the government of Bangladesh on how to address past violations and prevent such abuses from occurring in the future.

The Adviser for the Ministry of Foreign Affairs Md. Touhid Hossain reiterated the government's support of the mission.

== Investigation ==
The OHCHR Fact-Finding Team started their investigation on 14 September 2024 into the events of July and August 2024. The team visited several key cities in Bangladesh, including Dhaka, Chattogram, Rangpur, and other locations affected by the protests and violence. Interviews were conducted with a range of individuals, including victims, witnesses, law enforcement officers, and medical practitioners. The team also collected information from human rights organisations, civil society groups, and other stakeholders involved in the protests.

As part of its investigation, the mission called for submissions from individuals, groups, and organisations to provide additional evidence or testimonies that had not been made publicly available. The mission's investigation was independent of any national legal processes. The fact-finding team worked under the mandate of the United Nations Human Rights Office to determine the facts but did not have the authority to prosecute or arrest individuals.

== Report ==
The United Nations fact-finding mission on Bangladesh, published the report on 12 February 2025 by the OHCHR, documented widespread human rights violations during the protests between July and August 2024. The report, based on over 250 interviews and various digital pieces of evidence, outlined several key issues and conclusions regarding the crackdown by former Bangladeshi government officials.

=== Key Findings ===
- The report found that security forces employed disproportionate force against protesters, including the use of live ammunition. An estimated 1,400 individuals were killed, many of them students or young people engaged in the protests. Security forces were accused of targeting protesters, journalists, and medical personnel. The report also indicates that three-quarters of protest deaths were caused by firearms, with 60 percent of them being shot with weapons "meant for war".
- Thousands of individuals were detained without charge during the protests. The report found numerous cases of arbitrary detention, where individuals were subjected to beatings, torture, and ill-treatment in custody. It was reported that some detainees were forced to sign confessions or were denied access to legal representation. Many detainees were also subjected to enforced disappearances for extended periods.
- The report highlighted the gendered nature of violence during the protests. Women were subjected to sexual violence, including rape and harassment, by security forces and groups aligned with the ruling party Awami League.
- The report also indicated that journalists, human rights defenders, and activists were also targeted by the state. Over 50 journalists were injured or detained while covering the protests and many were harassed, and several media outlets faced government censorship or shutdowns.
- The report also documented widespread violence and destruction of public and private property following violent protests. Several key infrastructures, including transport networks, government buildings, and minority communities, were attacked, with reports of targeted violence against minorities during the unrest.

=== Recommendations ===
The report made several recommendations to address the violations identified:

1. The OHCHR called for independent, impartial investigations into the human rights violations committed by the security forces, particularly in relation to killings, torture, and enforced disappearances.
2. There were calls for comprehensive reforms to the police and military justice systems to prevent further abuses. Additionally, the report recommended that laws (Anti-terrorism Act, 2009) allowing for excessive use of force in public demonstrations be repealed or revised to protect the right to peaceful protest.
3. The report emphasised the need to ensure the protection of journalists, activists, and human rights defenders and urged the government to strengthen safeguards for freedom of expression, assembly, and association.
4. In light of the severity of the violations, the OHCHR recommended that the situation in Bangladesh be referred to the International Criminal Court (ICC) for further investigation into potential crimes against humanity.
5. The OHCHR urged the United Nations and other international bodies to continue monitoring the situation in Bangladesh and provide technical assistance to the government in implementing the recommended reforms.

== Reactions ==
=== Organisations ===
- United Nations High Commissioner for Human Rights, Volker Türk reiterated the findings of the OHCHR fact-finding team, calling them an essential tool for justice. Türk criticised the former Bangladeshi government's response to the protests and urged it to respect the rights of all citizens, particularly in allowing the freedom to assemble peacefully and express dissent.
- Amnesty International issued a statement in support of the report, calling it a crucial step in holding the former Bangladeshi government accountable for its actions. Amnesty described the crackdown on protesters as "excessive and brutal" and urged the international community to pressure the Bangladeshi government to allow independent investigations and provide reparations to victims.
- Human Rights Watch similarly backed the findings, stressing the need for concrete actions to address the violations. HRW's South Asia Director, Meenakshi Ganguly, urged Bangladesh to ensure justice for the victims of the violent crackdown.
- International Society for Human Rights expressed "grave concern" over the findings and condemned the report's documentation of "extrajudicial killings, arbitrary arrests, and torture", and called for immediate accountability.

=== Domestic ===
Following the report, interim government's chief adviser Muhammad Yunus expressed his support for the report, stating:

I, along with everyone else working in the Interim Government and millions of other Bangladeshis, am committed to transforming Bangladesh into a country in which all its people can live in security and dignity.

— Muhammad Yunus

Bangladesh Nationalist Party, one of the major opposition parties, welcomed the report and its findings, calling it a "wake-up call" for the Bangladeshi government. Mirza Fakhrul Islam Alamgir, the BNP general secretary, stated that the UN report was a critical document that confirmed widespread repression and political violence and called on the Indian government to repatriate Hasina.

Shafiqur Rahman, ameer of Bangladesh Jamaat-e-Islami, also endorsed the report calling it "a document of genocide" and called on the Interim Government to prosecute the perpetrators.

Mohammad A. Arafat, former Minister of State for Information and Broadcasting of Awami League urged global action against the interim government, citing the report highlights public fear under the administration. He also denied state-led violence as a conspiracy, accusing Muhammad Yunus’s administration of feeding false testimonies to UN inspectors using coerced state employees. While acknowledging security force lapses during past unrest, he demands Yunus’s resignation for partisan governance, advocating a return to presidential authority and fair elections to restore democracy and stability.

=== Army ===
The report mentioned that UN warned the Bangladesh Army about their human rights violations during protests, as involvements on human rights violations can cause restrictions from the United Nations peacekeeping. In reaction, Inter-Services Public Relations denied it and said that the army is not aware about warning and probably the warning was given to the government instead of the army. They also claimed that the army worked for keep people safe during the protests.
