= Operation Devil Hunt =

Nationwide joint forces operation in Bangladesh

- Part of the Aftermath of the July Uprising
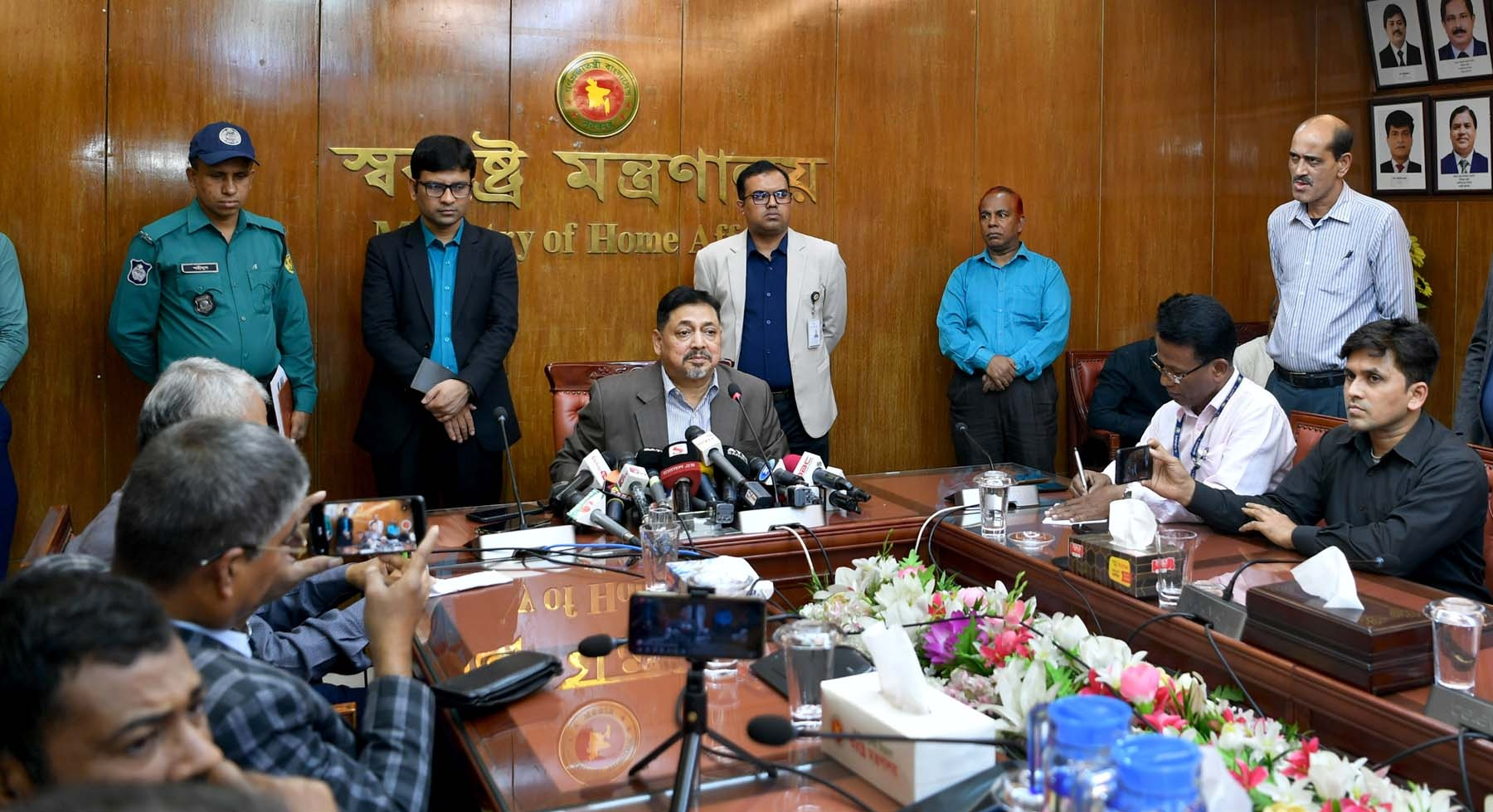
- Ministry of Home Affairs Briefing on the Launch of Operation Devil Hunt
Date	8 February 2025 – 17 February 2026; Phase-1: 8 February 2025 – 3 March 2025; Phase-2: 13 December 2025 – 17 February 2026
Location	Bangladesh
Status	Inconclusive

Belligerents
Government of Bangladesh; Ministry of Home Affairs; Bangladesh Police; Rapid Action Battalion; Bangladesh Ansar; Border Guard Bangladesh; Bangladesh Coast Guard; Ministry of Defence; Bangladesh Armed Forces; Bangladesh Army; Bangladesh Navy; Bangladesh Air Force	Awami League: Chhatra League; Jubo League; Swechasebak League; Awami League supporters & affiliates; Former cabinet members; Former members of parliament

Commanders and leaders
Muhammad Yunus (Bangladesh) Jahangir Alam Chowdhury; Waker-Uz-Zaman; Mohammad Nazmul Hassan; Hasan Mahmood Khan; Baharul Alam; Ashrafuzzaman Siddiqui	Fugitive high-profile members of deposed Awami League: Sheikh Hasina (fugitive); Asaduzzaman Khan (fugitive); Obaidul Quader (fugitive)

Casualties and losses
none	Phase-1: 12,500 arrested Phase-2: 26,608 arrested; 990 firearms recovered; 2,136 cartridges recovered; 608 molotov cocktails recovered; 108 bombs recovered; 29,606 rounds of bullets recovered.

Operation Devil Hunt (Bengali: অপারেশন ডেভিল হান্ট) was an operation launched by the Interim government of Bangladesh on 8 February 2025 following protests over a violent attack on students and civilians in Gazipur by Awami League supporters on 7 February 2025. The operation targets alleged henchmen and supporters of the deposed prime minister Sheikh Hasina.

== Background ==
On February 8, 2025, at 1:30 PM (BST; 7:30 AM UTC), the Dhirashram area of Gazipur District would erupt in protests led by the Students Against Discrimination over the beatings of at least 20 students the previous night by people that are alleged to have connections to the Awami League.

At around 4:00 PM (BST; 10:00 AM UTC), the government would launch the nationwide "Operation Devil Hunt" in compliance with the protesters. At around 6:00 PM (BST; 12:00 PM UTC), Sarjis Alam would be informed that so far 16 individuals had been arrested, Alam would then give a speech threatening the government with a second revolution if they attack the protesters and that if the government fails to arrest the perpetrators by night, then they will have to face the protesters once more.

Students Against Discrimination have launched an attack on the house of AKM Mozammel Haque, former minister in the cabinet of Sheikh Hasina, as a part of the Bulldozer March. During this demonstration, a person at a local mosque announced people were attacking the former Minister's home, leading locals to counter-attack the demonstrators, causing 15 to be injured, and one of them later died in hospital. It was part of a wave of attacks targeting homes of Awami League leaders, while chanting "Delhi or Dhaka — Dhaka, Dhaka" and slogans against Sheikh Mujibur Rahman's cult of personality. The home of former President Sheikh Mujibur Rahman, the Bangabandhu Memorial Museum, was destroyed and the personal home of former Prime Minister Sheikh Hasina, Sudha Sadan, was burned down. The home of former Minister Zahid Ahsan Russel, along with the homes of his family members associated with the Awami League were also attacked by protesters in Gazipur. A mural of Ahsanullah Master, Zahid's father, was also destroyed during this attack.

The Jatiya Nagorik Committee and the Students Against Discrimination gave 24 hours to detain those who attacked the students at home of Haque. They demanded the cancellation of the registration of Awami League and confiscation of the properties of its leaders. The training secretary of Gazipur Metropolitan unit of Islami Chhatra Shibir, Haider Ali, called for the detention of the attackers as well. They called for removing the Adviser of the Ministry of Home Affairs, and civil and police officers in Gazipur District. Lt. Gen. (retd.) Jahangir Alam Chowdhury, adviser of the Ministry of Home Affairs, said, "No one involved in the attack on the students will be spared. We are taking legal action against them. All responsible for the attack will be exposed to justice," at the Dhaka Medical College and Hospital while visiting the injured. The office-in-charge of the local police station was suspended, and the commissioner of Gazipur Metropolitan Police, Nazmul Karim Khan, offered his apology.

== Operation ==
On 9 February, 83 people, including Awami League politicians and members, were detained in the Gazipur District. In total, 1,308 people were arrested across Bangladesh. 343 more people were arrested from various parts of Bangladesh the following day. 607 people were detained on the third day, taking a total number of detainees to more than two thousand. A total of 11,313 people were arrested in the ongoing operation.

By March, more than 12 thousand people were detained across Bangladesh.

In phase two, until 14 February 2026, over 29,000 people have been arrested nationwide.

== Reaction ==
The Jatiya Party (Ershad) accused that the operation was a "suppression of dissent" and alleged that their leaders were being charged on false charges while their homes were being attacked and destroyed.

== See also ==
- Operation Clean Heart
- Bangladesh post-resignation violence (2024–2026)
