= Murder of Saiful Islam Alif =

2024 murder of a Bangladeshi lawyer

- Part of the Bangladesh post-resignation violence (2024–2026)
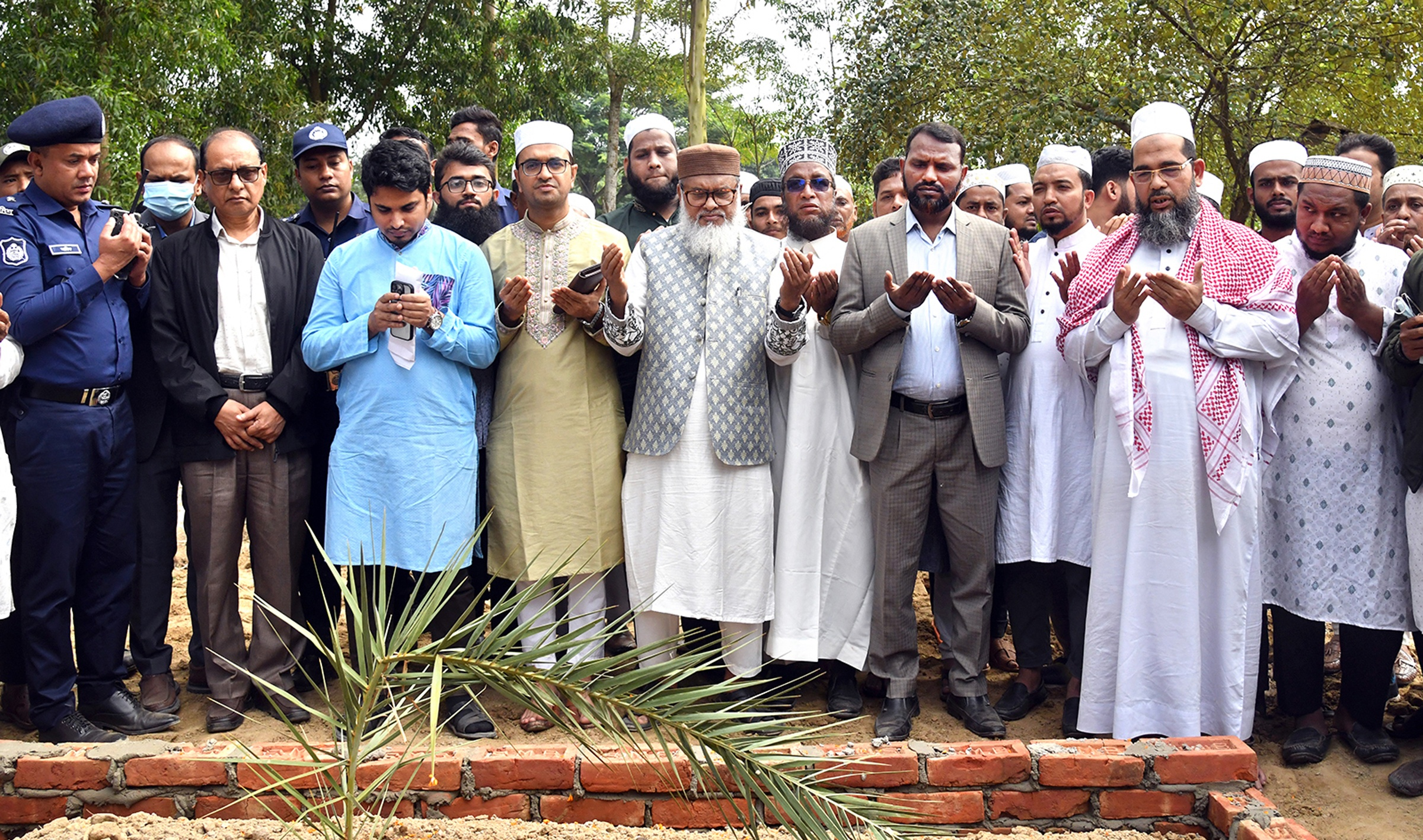
- Supplication for Alif at his grave during ministerial visit by AFM Khaled Hossain
- Location: 22°20′6″N 91°50′4″E; Chattogram Court Building, Kotwali, Chittagong, Bangladesh
- Date: 26 November 2024 c. 01:19 pm (UTC+6)
- Attack type: Organised attack and assault with sharp weapons
- Weapons: Sticks, sharp weapons
- Victim: Saiful Islam Alif
- Perpetrator: Supporters of Chinmoy Krishna Das
- Assailant: Members of ISKCON (alleged)
- No. of participants: 14
- Accused: Premnandan Das Buja, Ranab Das, Bidhan Das, Bikash Das, Rumit Das, Raj Kapoor, Samir Das, Shiv Kumar Das, Om Das, Ajay Das, and Debi Charan

On 26 November 2024, Saiful Islam Alif, a lawyer practicing at the Chittagong Court, was fatally attacked with sharp weapons by unidentified assailants during a protest demanding the release of Bangladeshi Hindu monk Chinmoy Krishna Das, who had been arrested on charges of sedition. Reports indicate that the violence involved individuals identified as followers of Das and alleged supporters of International Society for Krishna Consciousness (ISKCON). However, ISKCON Bangladesh has denied any involvement in the incident.

== Background ==
On 25 November 2024, Chinmoy Krishna Das, spokesperson of the Bangladesh Sanatan Jagaran Mancha, was arrested from the Hazrat Shahjalal International Airport on charges of sedition. The next day, Das was presented before the Chittagong Court where he was denied bail and was ordered to be sent to jail. Following the court hearing, his followers including alleged members of ISKCON, started a protest in the vicinity of the court, demanding his release. They also prevented him from being taken to jail by blocking the way of the police van. After the protesters threw bricks at the police, the law enforcements started baton charge, throwing tear gas and sound grenades. Following which, the agitators vandalised cars, motorcycles and a lawyer's chamber on the ground floor of the court building. In addition, the glass of the court's central mosque was broken due to the agitators throwing stones.

=== Saiful Islam Alif ===
Saiful Islam Alif (Bengali: সাইফুল ইসলাম আলিফ) was a resident of the Chunati area in Lohagara Upazila, Chittagong, Bangladesh. He passed Dakhil from Adhunagar Islamia Kamil Madrasa and HSC from Chittagong College. He passed LLB and LLM from International Islamic University, Chittagong (IIUC). He began his legal career in 2018, practicing law in Chittagong. He was later admitted as an advocate of the High Court in 2023.

Several lawyers also confirmed that Alif was politically affiliated with the Bangladesh Nationalist Party (BNP). He was a member of the BNP's legal aid committee in Lohagara Upazila and participated in the Bangladesh Jatiotabadi Ainjibi Forum, a pro-BNP law firm. His name was listed as a voter within the organisation as well. Also, Alif was claimed to be a member of the BNP-Jamaat-backed lawyers' panel. However, Ameer of Bangladesh Jamaat-e-Islami Shafiqur Rahman claimed that Alif was a member of the Bangladesh Jamaat-e-Islami party.

== Murder ==
Amidst the unrest, Alif was reportedly dragged into the nearby Rangam Convention Hall by some of the protesters near the court, where he was subjected to a severe physical assault. Witness accounts and a video posted on social media, suggest that he was beaten and hacked, leading to critical injuries.

Local witnesses eventually rescued him and rushed him to Chattogram Medical College Hospital, where he was pronounced dead around 4:00 p.m. BST citing blunt force trauma. His murder happened amidst a broader atmosphere of disorder, with the attackers leveraging the protests to carry out the targeted assault. Several other people, including bystanders and journalists, were injured during the clashes.

Alif was buried at his village Chunati after funeral prayers at Chittagong Court compound and Jamiatul Falah Mosque at Chittagong City and two funeral prayers at Lohagara Upazila. Apart from this, absentee funeral prayers were held in several places around the country, including Dhaka University.

== Reactions ==
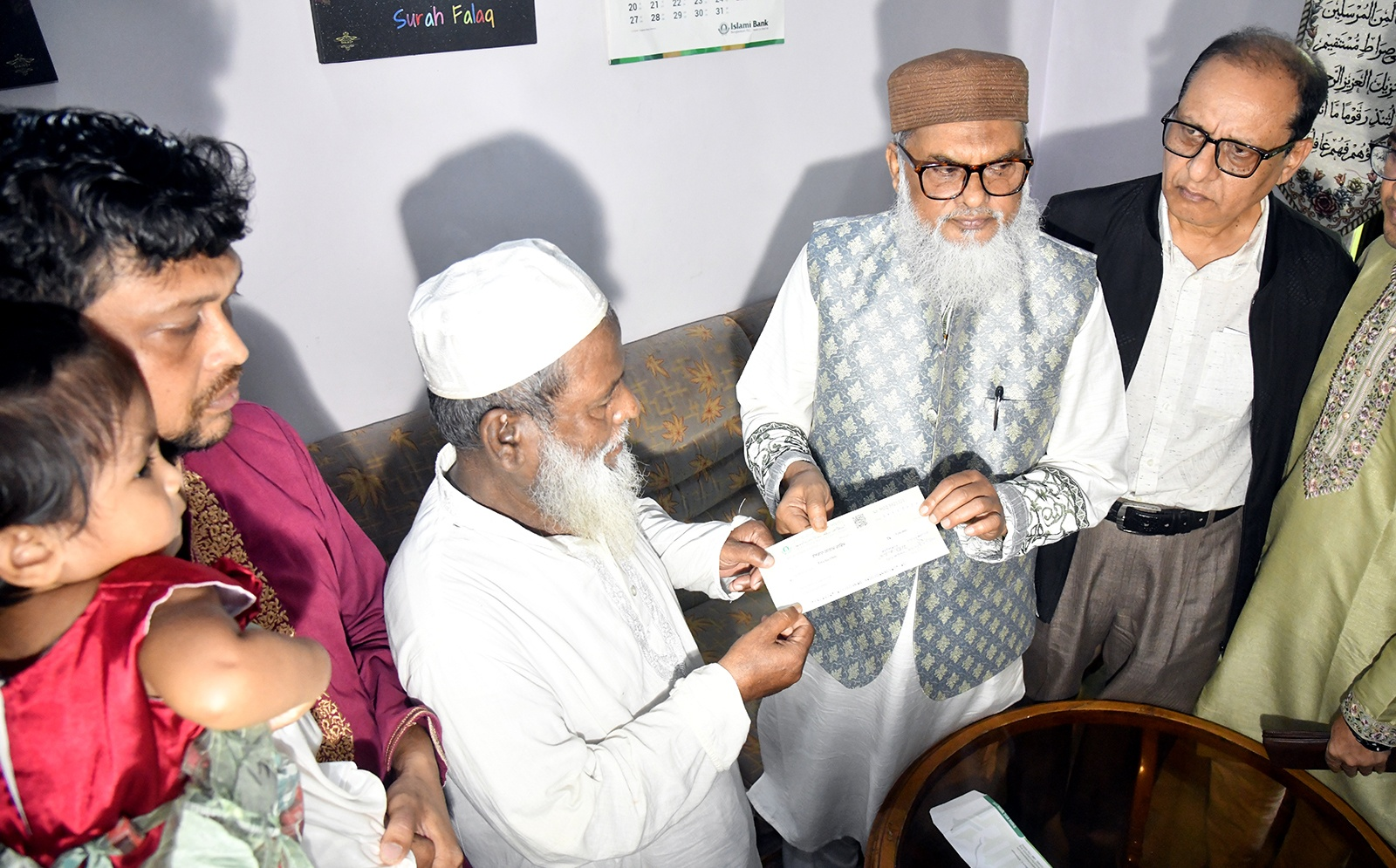
Financial Grant Handover to Father of Alif by Minister AFM Khalid Hossain.

Chief Adviser Muhammad Yunus condemned the murder and assured legal action to be taken. In addition, various political parties and civil society members issued statements condemning the killing. Ameer of Jamaat-e-Islami Shafiqur Rahman condemned the killing, claiming the victim to be a party member.

After Alif's funeral, Sarjis Alam, a coordinator of the Anti-discrimination Students Movement, addressed the press, calling for a ban on ISKCON.

In addition, various Islamist organisations like Hefazat-e-Islam Bangladesh, Bangladesh Ulama Parishad, Khelafat Majlish & Bangladesh Islami Chhatra Shibir (the student's wing of the Bangladesh Jamaat-e-Islami) and a section of lawyers under the umbrellas of the Bangladesh Jatiyatabadi Ainjibi Forum (the legal wing of the Bangladesh Nationalist Party) & Bangladesh Supreme Court Bar Association demanded the arrest of those involved in the murder and the banning of ISKCON. However, the Bangladesh Supreme Court rejected all pleas to ban ISKCON.

Chittagong District Bar Association observed a strike on 27 and 28 November to protest the murder of Saiful Islam Alif.

In a news conference on 28 November, ISKCON denied any kind of involvement in the murder of Alif.

== Prosecution ==
A video footage of Alif's killing was widely circulated on social media. Following an analysis of the footage, police identified and arrested seven individuals in connection with the incident: Rumit Das, Sumit Das, Gagan Das, Nayan Das, Bishal Das, Aman Das, and Monu Methor. BGC Trust University authority expelled a law student over the incident.

On the night of 29 November, Alif's father filed a murder case with Kotwali Police Station, naming 31 individuals and 10-15 unidentified persons as accused.

On 4 December, at around 11:45 pm (BST), police arrested Chandan Das, the prime accused in the Alif murder case, from Bhairab, Kishoreganj.

On 10 April 2025, court denied bail for 11 accused in the murder case

== Misinformation in media ==
Incorrect and false information was spread in several media outlets regarding the murder of lawyer Alif. Several Indian media outlets, including FirstPost, The Economic Times, Republic World and OpIndia, published inaccurate reports claiming that the Alif was Chinmoy Das' lawyer. Indian media outlets also claimed that Alif was shot dead by police. The Chief Adviser's press wing said that the claim spread in the Indian media is being spread with false and malicious intentions. The news agency Reuters also published a news report written by journalist Ruma Paul, quoting Chittagong Metropolitan Police Deputy Police Commissioner Liaquat Ali Khan, claiming that lawyer Alif was Das' lawyer. However, the government's press wing said that Reuters or any journalist had not taken any statement from Liaquat Ali Khan and that the Chittagong Metropolitan Police protested, saying that Reuters' report was not objective. Later, Reuters revised its report.

According to a report published by BBC Bangla, Alif was mistakenly reported as an assistant public prosecutor in several media.

== See also ==
- Murder of Abrar Fahad
- Hazari Lane violence
- Bangladesh post-resignation violence (2024–2026)
