= Hazari Lane violence =

2024 violence in Chittagong, Bangladesh

- Part of Bangladesh post-resignation violence (2024-2026)
- Date: 5 November 2024
- Location: Hazari Lane, Chittagong, Bangladesh
- Caused by: Anti-ISKCON Facebook post
- Methods: Beating, vandalism, brick pelting, acid throwing

Parties
| Hindu protesters: ISKCON (alleged; denied by the organisation | Bangladesh Police; Bangladesh Army |

Casualties
- Injuries: 12 (police and army); Unknown number of Hindu protesters
- Arrested: 49

In November 2024, an incident in Hazari Lane, Chittagong, Bangladesh, was triggered by a Facebook post referring the International Society for Krishna Consciousness (ISKCON) as a "terrorist organisation". The post reportedly caused discontent among ISKCON members. Subsequently, a mob, including members associated with ISKCON, attacked a local Muslim businessman who shared the post and attempted to burn down his shop in the vicinity.

Joint forces of Bangladesh Police and Bangladesh Army intervened to disperse the crowd and conducted searches of local properties in the area. According to statement from the joint forces, they were reportedly attacked by individuals in the crowd, who threw acid and other objects at them during the incident, resulting in the injuries to several personnel. In connection with the incident, Chattogram Metropolitan Police detained 80 individuals and 49 people were shown arrested after verification.

== Background ==
Chittagong, similar to other cities in Bangladesh, has a predominantly Muslim population, with 87.96% identifying as Muslim and 10.30% as Hindu, according to the 2022 Bangladeshi census. Hazari Lane, the location of the incident, is a historically Hindu-majority area and hosts approximately 150 Hindu jewellery traders at Mia Shopping Center.

In late October 2024, the Hindu community held a rally at Laldighi Maidan in Chittagong to address several grievances following violence against Hindus in the aftermath of the Student–People's uprising. Their eight-point demands included prosecuting perpetrators of recent attacks against minorities, providing compensation to affected individuals, and enacting laws to protect minority communities. These concerns were echoed by the United Nations High Commissioner for Human Rights, Volker Türk, during his visit to Bangladesh in October 2024. Around the same time, Mahmudur Rahman, editor of Amar Desh, delivered a speech in Dhaka, was critical of ISKCON. He stated:

"A communal organisation like ISKCON and R&AW held such a big meeting in Chittagong. In ISKCON, you will see there are thugs of Chhatra League and Jubo League."

The General Secretary of ISKCON Bangladesh, Charu Chandra Das Brahmachari, denied the allegations, asserting that ISKCON is a non-political and religious international organisation. Meanwhile, some individuals from the local Muslim community were observed sharing posts on social media criticizing ISKCON. Among these was a post shared by a Muslim businessman from Hazari Lane.

== Incident ==
Osman Ali, a Muslim businessman, made a Facebook post referring ISKCON as a "terrorist organisation," which triggered anger and tension among local ISKCON affiliated Hindus in Hazari Lane. In response, a group of Hindus gathered outside Mia Shopping Center, demanding an apology from the individual responsible for the post. On the evening of 5 November, tensions escalated, leading to prolonged unrest that eventually resulted in clashes. The situation intensified when protesters surrounded the shop of the individual who made the post, attacked the establishment, and continued their demonstration outside.

A joint team of police and army personnel intervened to rescue the individual who had posted on Facebook and escorted him to a police station. During the operation, the crowd turned on and attempted to obstruct the rescue by throwing bricks at the joint forces, while chanting "Jai Shree Ram" slogan. In response, the forces fired several blanks into the air to disperse the crowd. At a press conference held on 6 November, joint forces spokesperson Lt. Col. Ferdous Ahmed reported that bricks and acid, typically used in jewellery work, were thrown at the personnel, resulting in injuries to five army officers and seven police officers. Osman's shop was destroyed, and neighboring businesses were also damaged. Following the incident 82 individuals were arrested, with 49 facing formal charges. Osman Ali was also detained under blasphemy laws.

Around 8:30 p.m. that night, the joint forces re-entered Hazari Lane and beat those who participated in the violence. Many Hindu homes were raided. The joint forces broke or disabled all CCTV cameras in the jewellery shops of the Hindu community and shut down all the shops.

Regarding the incident, Charu Chandra Das Brahmachari, the General Secretary of ISKCON Bangladesh, told Deutsche Welle Bangla:

"We want the real perpetrators to be identified through proper investigation. Before that, we want the rule of law to be upheld. We have seen videos showing the joint forces breaking the CCTV cameras. Why would they break CCTV cameras? It means there was something they didn't want evidence of. This does not reflect the rule of law."

Kajol Banik, the Joint Secretary of the Chittagong Jewellery Association, said:

"On Tuesday night, the joint forces entered Hazari Lane and beat anyone they found. People were beaten mercilessly. Homes were raided. All the businessmen in the area are from the Hindu community. Each jewellery shop had two or three CCTV cameras, all of which were destroyed. They should arrest the person who threw acid. We will not object. What we heard is that, before breaking down the gate, members of the joint forces were saying, 'One, two, three, open the door, or we'll shoot.' In such a situation, someone reportedly threw acid from the jewellery shop at them."

On 8 November, the police force, accompanied by a magistrate, went to Hazari Lane and opened the shuttered shops. The Hindu shopkeepers complained that the hard disk of the shops' CCTV was taken away, and the bond was alleged taken with the statement that "there was no damage to the shop".

== Aftermath ==
On 8 November, Hefazat-e-Islam Bangladesh, an Islamist advocacy group, organised a rally at the Anderkilla Shahi Jame Mosque square in Chittagong. After the Friday prayer, the speakers in the rally organised in the mosque premises demanded the ban of ISKCON in Bangladesh. The rally condemned the attack on the shop of businessman Osman Ali in Hazari Lane, and the attack and acid throwing on the joint forces' personnel. Speakers of Hefazet-e-Islam referred to ISKCON as an "anti-Hindu militant organisation" in this rally. Hefazat leader Quamrul Islam Quasemi said in that rally:

"Our clear objective about ISKCON is that ISKCON isn't any religious organisation. ISKCON is an international militant organisation. ISKCON has already been banned in several countries. Therefore, ISKCON isn't any Sanatana organisation. ISKCON is a militant organisation bore by the Jews and the Christians. So, we seek attention to our Hindu brothers that don't fall in the trap of ISKCON. [...] We have already seen that our Sanatani brothers are being persecuted by the ISKCON."

Sayem Ullah, the Central Assistant Publicity Secretary of Hefazat-e-Islam said:

"I want to say clearly that ISKCON is not a Hindu organisation. ISKCON is an anti-Sanatani militant organisation. Hindus, Muslims, Buddhists, Christians – all have been living in harmony in Bangladesh since the independence. Despite being the majority in the country, we [Muslims] have never attacked members of other religions. But in the last 15 years, this ISKCON was implementing its own secret agenda using the support of the Awami League fascists."

He also alleged that ISKCON has been attacking Muslims and administrative officials after the fall of Awami League government on 5 August.

== Reactions ==
Randhir Jaiswal, the official spokesperson of the Indian Ministry of External Affairs, condemned the alleged attack on members of the Hindu community in Chittagong and called on the interim government to ensure the safety of the country's Hindu community.

== See also ==
- Murder of Saiful Islam Alif
- Criticism of ISKCON
