= 2024 attack on the Bangladesh Assistant High Commission in India =

Hindu extremism in Tripura, India

Attack on the Bangladesh Assistant High Commission, Agartala
- Part of Hindu extremism
- Agartala (Tripura) Agartala (India)
- Location: 23°50′59″N 91°17′02″E; Bangladesh Assistant High Commission, Agartala, Tripura, India
- Date: 2 December 2024; Around 2.00 p.m. (UTC+5:30)
- Attack type: Vandalism
- Perpetrator: Hindu Sangharsh Samity
- Motive: To protest and demand Chinmoy Krishna Das' release
- Accused: 7

On 2 December 2024, an attack took place at the Bangladesh Assistant High Commission in Agartala, the capital of the Indian state of Tripura. The attackers were identified as members of Hindu Sangharsh Samiti, affiliated to the far-right Hindutva group Vishva Hindu Parishad.

== Background ==
Diplomatic relations between Bangladesh and India began to deteriorate after the Resignation of Sheikh Hasina, a strong ally of India, following the July Revolution in July–August 2024. As the Indian media began a disinformation campaign against Bangladesh, the Indian government repeatedly expressed concerns over what they perceived as violent communal attacks on the Bangladeshi Hindus.

On 25 November 2024, Chinmoy Krishna Das, a Hindu monk and spokesperson of Sanatan Jagaran Mancha, was arrested on sedition charges in Bangladesh, leading to widespread protests in India. Demanding the release of Das, on 27 November, Bharatiya Janata Party's West Bengal chief Suvendu Adhikari threatened to stage a blockade at the Bangladesh–India border on 2 December. On 29 November, members of the Hindu organisation Bongio Hindu Jagran broke the police barricade and burned the national flag of Bangladesh and an effigy of Chief Adviser Muhammad Yunus at the boundary of the Deputy High Commission of Bangladesh in Kolkata, to which the government of Bangladesh expressed official condemnation. In Assam's Karimganj District, around 40,000 members of the Sanatani Aikya Mancha, chanting Jai Shri Ram, attempted to cross the border with Bangladesh to avenge alleged attacks on minority Hindus.

== Event ==
Hindu Sangharsh Samity were holding anti-Bangladeshi protests for several days in Agartala, the capital of the Northeast Indian state of Tripura which shares a border with Bangladesh. On 2 December 2024, at around 2 p.m. IST, members of the organisation appeared at the Bangladesh Assistant High Commission in Agartala and entered its premises, chanting Jai Shri Ram. The attackers "took down the Bangladesh flag, set it on fire, and caused some vandalism inside the building". Following the incident, all kinds of visa and consular services at the Assistant High Commission were closed indefinitely by the Bangladeshi authorities.

== Reactions ==
Bangladesh's Ministry of Foreign Affairs released an official statement expressing "deep resentment" and calling the attack "pre-planned", which took place in the presence of local law enforcement officials. The statement also noted that the attack was a violation of the 1961 Vienna Convention on Diplomatic Relations. The ministry also summoned the Indian high commissioner in Dhaka, Pranay Kumar Verma. Chief Adviser Muhammad Yunus called for national unity to counter the "misinformation" of Indian media. Two advisers of the interim government, Nahid Islam and M Sakhawat Hossain, also criticised the Indian government for the incident.

Protests were held by different political and student organisations in Bangladesh, including the Students Against Discrimination, Bangladesh Chhatra Odhikar Parishad, Bangladesh Nationalist Party (BNP), Islami Andolan Bangladesh, Gono Odhikar Parishad and Jatiya Nagorik Committee, condemning the attack.

On 10 December, Spokesperson for the US Department of State Matthew Miller expressed deep concern over the incident and urged both sides to resolve diplomatic disputes peacefully.

== Prosecution ==
On 3 December, seven individuals were detained on suspicion of being involved in the attack and three policemen posted at the Assistant High Commission area were suspended for alleged negligence in duty.
