= Rezia Islam =

Bangladeshi politician

- রেজিয়া ইসলাম

Member of Jatiya Sangsad from reserved women's seat-1
- In office 30 January 2024 – 6 August 2024
- Preceded by: Sherin Ahmed

Personal details
- Born: 10 January 1958 (age 67); Panchagarh
- Political party: Awami League

Rezia Islam (born 10 January 1958) is a Bangladesh Awami League politician and a former Jatiya Sangsad member from a women's reserved seat for Panchagarh District in 2024.
