= Bamrail =

Bamrail Union
- Location in Bangladesh
- Coordinates: 22°53′N 90°16′E
- Country: Bangladesh
- Division: Barisal Division
- District: Barisal District Upzila Wazirpur =
- Time zone: UTC+6 (Bangladesh Time)
- Postal code: 8224

Bamrail is a village in Barisal District in the Barisal Division of southern-central Bangladesh.
