= Chinmoy Krishna Das =

Bangladeshi Hindu monk

Prabhu Chinmoy Krishna Das Brahmachari
- চিন্ময় কৃষ্ণ দাস

Personal life
- Born: Chandan Kumar Dhar
- Known for: Spokesperson of Bangladesh Sanatan Jagaran Mancha

Religious life
- Religion: Hinduism
- Denomination: Gaudiya Vaishnavism
- Temple: Pundarik Dham Ashram
- Institute: Bangladesh Sanatan Jagaran Mancha; International Society for Krishna Consciousness (expelled)
- Profession: Hindu monk

Chinmoy Krishna Das (Bengali: চিন্ময় কৃষ্ণ দাস) is a Bangladeshi Hindu monk and the spokesperson for the Bangladesh Sanatan Jagaran Mancha. He rose to prominence advocating for the rights of religious minorities in Bangladesh following the political changes of August 2024. On 25 November 2024, Das was arrested on charges of sedition, an event that triggered protests and drew diplomatic comments from the Indian government. He is a former member of ISKCON Bangladesh, having been expelled in July 2024 due to disciplinary issues.

== Life and occupation ==
Chinmoy Krishna Das is a Hindu monk, who heads the Pundarik Dham, a Vaishnavite religious centre in Hathazari, Chittagong District. The Dham is also an important part of ISKCON in Bangladesh. Das was a member of ISKCON till July 2024, when he was expelled on the grounds of organisational discipline.

Das had regularly advocated for the rights of religious minorities in Bangladesh, and garnered increasing attention after the fall of Sheikh Hasina administration on 5 August 2024. He served as the spokesperson for Bangladesh Sanatan Jagaran Mancha, which campaigned for the rights of Hindus and other religious minorities.

On 25 October, the Sanatan Jagaran Mancha held a massive rally at Lal Dighi, Chittagong and issued eight demands. These include the establishment of special tribunals for speedy trials of minority persecution, the enactment of a minority protection law, the creation of a Ministry of Minority Affairs, laws to recover temple properties, etc.

Around this time, Sanatan Jagaran Mancha formed a coalition with Bangladesh Sommilito Shankhalogu Jot, to form Bangladesh Sommilito Sanatan Jagaran Jot. Das also served as the spokesperson for the united organisation.

== Sedition case ==
During the 25 October rally, it is alleged that some youth raised saffron flag on the Independence Monument at the New Market intersection in Chittagong. It is further alleged that this flag was over the national flag of Bangladesh and thus amounted to sedition.

A local leader of the Bangladesh Nationalist Party (BNP) named Firoz Khan registered a case of sedition against 19 people, including Das. The others included Ajay Datta, coordinator of Hindu Jagaran Mancha (a separate organisation) and Leela Raj Das, chief priest of ISKCON Chittagong Temple. Firoz Khan was soon expelled from BNP for filing the case without informing the party, as per Dhaka Tribune. The expulsion letter cited involvement in "activities contrary to the party's principles". Hindu Jagaran Mancha leaders staged a protest demanding the withdrawal of the case.

On 25 November 2024, Das was arrested by Dhaka Metropolitan Police at the Hazrat Shahjalal International Airport in Dhaka. He was charged with sedition for disrespecting the national flag. He was presented before the Chattogram Sixth Metropolitan Magistrate's Court on 26 November 2024, where Magistrate Kazi Shariful Islam rejected his bail application and ordered his detention. His lawyers requested that he be allowed to follow religious practices while in custody, to which the court instructed compliance with prison regulations.

Upon his bail being rejected, his followers protested in front of the court building, which became violent after clashing with law enforcement forces. During the violence, a lawyer named Saiful Islam Alif was hacked to death by an individual. His death resulted in nationwide counter-protests by the lawyers and other organisations demanding a ban on ISKCON. Lawyers at Chittagong court boycotted the judicial proceedings the next day. Chief Adviser Muhammad Yunus denounced the killing and urged for proper inquiry of the incident.

On 3 December, Das' bail plea hearing was postponed further to 2 January 2025 as no lawyer was present on his behalf. This absence has been explained to be out of fears of threat and pressure from "a politically motivated lawyers group". On 30 April 2025, he was granted bail by the High Court Division. The Students Against Discrimination activists held rallies demanding cancellation of the bail and ban on ISKCON. Justice Md. Rezaul Haque of the Appellate Division halted his bail.

== Reactions ==
=== Domestic ===
- ISKCON Bangladesh denounced the arrest of Das and condemned the subsequent violence and attacks on Hindus. It urged the government to promote peace between communities.

=== International ===
- ISKCON Kolkata called the arrest of Das the "latest example of continuing attacks" on ISKCON members and members of minority communities in Bangladesh. It claimed to have alerted the Indian government.
- The Indian Ministry of External Affairs expressed concern over his arrest and urged the Bangladeshi government to ensure the safety and protection of minority communities, emphasizing their right to peaceful assembly. Bangladesh's Ministry of Foreign Affairs issued a counterstatement regarding India's concern over the arrest of Chinmoy Krishna Das. The statement expressed regret over the misrepresentation of the issue as an internal matter of Bangladesh and emphasized that such comments undermine the spirit of friendship between the two nations. It highlighted that the judiciary of Bangladesh is independent, and the case involving Das is currently under judicial consideration, with no interference from the government. The statement reaffirmed Bangladesh's commitment to protecting the rights of all citizens, including religious minorities, and ensuring their freedom of expression and worship.
- The United Kingdom Parliament members expressed concerns regarding the arrest of Das and the recent violence targeting the Hindu minority in Bangladesh. During an urgent discussion in the House of Commons, Conservative MP Priti Patel highlighted the spread of violence in Bangladesh and called for action to secure Das's release. Labour MP Barry Gardiner also drew attention to attacks on Hindu temples and described the situation as being "on a knife edge". Catherine West, the Under-Secretary of State for Indo-Pacific, assured Parliament of the UK government's commitment to advocating for religious freedom in Bangladesh and emphasised continued monitoring of developments by the Foreign, Commonwealth, and Development Office (FCDO) and affirmed the UK's support for the protection of minorities.

=== Individuals ===
- Sadhguru, founder of Isha Foundation, condemned the arrest of Das expressing concern over Bangladesh's drift from democratic to autocratic tendencies. He emphasized the importance of protecting religious freedom and upholding democratic values, warning against persecution based on religion or demographics.
- Deputy Chief Minister of Andhra Pradesh Pawan Kalyan condemned the arrest urging unity against atrocities on Hindus and calling on the Bangladeshi government to take immediate action.
- Exiled former Bangladeshi Prime Minister Sheikh Hasina condemned the arrest and said he was "unjustly arrested and must be released immediately".
- British Conservative MP Bob Blackman condemned the persecution of Hindus in Bangladesh, specifically highlighting the imprisonment of Das. He stated, "Today, I condemned the attacks on Hindus in Bangladesh and the imprisonment of Chinmoy Krishna Das."
- American actress and singer Mary Millben condemned the imprisonment of Das and the ongoing attacks against Hindus. She urged world leaders to address the issue, highlighting the need for global attention on religious persecution.
- Delhi's former Chief Minister and AAP leader Arvind Kejriwal criticised the arrest of Das urging the central government to intervene for his release. Kejriwal stated, "The entire nation stands in solidarity with Saint Chinmoy Krishna Das ji."
- Congress leader Priyanka Gandhi expressed concern over the arrest of Chinmoy Krishna Das, describing the incident as "extremely worrying." She urged the government to take steps to ensure the safety and security of minorities in Bangladesh.

== Controversies ==
Das faced accusations of orchestrating programmes aimed at creating communal unrest. Nahid Islam, an adviser of the interim government, accused him in a Facebook post of making false and provocative statements during various assemblies, allegedly attempting to incite communal division and disrupt social harmony. According to Daily Inqilab reports, Das was allegedly linked to the acid attack on army and police personnel in Chittagong's Hazari Lane incident of November 2024. Further allegations against him include occupying a pond owned by BNP Vice-chairman Mir Mohammad Nasiruddin in Hathazari, Chittagong.

In 2023, a complaint was submitted to the Governing Body Commission (GBC) alleging that Chinmoy Krishna Das had molested three minor boys. Following the complaint, Kamalesh Krishna Das, director of the ISKCON International Child Protection Office, directed him to stay away from anyone under the age of 18. He was also temporarily suspended from the organisation and prohibited from conducting religious rites. Following the allegations, Bangladesh police reportedly found no evidence substantiating them, and no charges were brought against him in connection with the allegations. Das was unavailable for comment while in jail, while a supporter told the BBC that the allegations were false and stemmed from "an internal feud between Iskcon leaders in Dhaka and Chittagong". At a press conference on 28 November 2024, Hrishikesh Gourango Das, a member of the Child Protection Team of ISKCON Bangladesh, said that children accused Chinmoy Das of abuse following which he was suspended for three months from the organisation and from the position of Pundarik Dham to investigate the matter. However, Das refrained from following the instructions, leading to his permanent expulsion. In July 2024, he was expelled from ISKCON for violating organisational discipline during his tenure as divisional organisational secretary for Chittagong.

== See also ==
- 2024 attack on the Bangladeshi Assistant High Commission in India
- Murder of Saiful Islam Alif
- Hazari Lane violence
