= Criticism of the Bangladesh Nationalist Party =

Negative aspects of Bangladesh Nationalist Party, as discussed in the media

The Sheaf of Paddy, election symbol of Bangladesh Nationalist Party

Public criticisms of the Bangladesh Nationalist Party (popularly abbreviated as BNP) include the Chatra Dal, the Jubodal, the Swechhasebak Dal, etc., as well as other bodies with which BNP is overtly or allegedly involved, when they were in power or not. Notable examples include the Murder of Sabekun Nahar Sonny, the Zia Charitable Trust corruption case, the Killing of Lal Chand Sohag, the Murder of Sabbir Alam Khandaker, the Killing of Moin Hossain Raju, the 2004 arms and ammunition haul in Chittagong, the Hawa Bhaban, the 2002 Police raid Shamsunnahar Hall, the 2004 Dhaka grenade attack, the 2005 Bangladesh bombings, the Indemnity Ordinance, 1975, etc.

== Political controversy ==
On 15 August 1975, the 'Indemnity Ordinance' was issued to block the trial for the assassination of Sheikh Mujibur Rahman, which was later legalized through the Fifth Amendment to the Constitution of Bangladesh during the BNP's rule in 1979. This is identified as the primary reason for the creation of a culture of impunity. In 2010, the Supreme Court of Bangladesh declared this amendment illegal.

== Allegations of corruption and nepotism ==
During the tenures of the Bangladesh Nationalist Party (BNP), particularly from 1991 to 1996 and 2001 to 2006 under the leadership of Khaleda Zia, various allegations of corruption emerged. These included accusations of embezzling funds through charitable trusts and government contracts, several of which were later subject to legal proceedings. In August 2011, the Anti-Corruption Commission filed the Zia Charitable Trust corruption case, accusing Khaleda Zia and her associates of converting approximately BDT 21.4 million (around US$250,000 at the time)—allocated for a trust intended for orphans and the poor—into personal assets, including the purchase of land for party activities. She was convicted in this case in 2018 and sentenced to five years in prison; however, the High Court acquitted her in 2024. Similarly, in a case filed in 2008 involving the unauthorized expenditure of BDT 31.5 million from the Zia Orphanage Trust, Khaleda Zia was sentenced to 10 years in prison in 2016. This conviction was overturned by the Supreme Court in January 2025, clearing her of the remaining corruption charges and paving the way for her participation in elections. BNP leaders have consistently described these legal proceedings as politically motivated trials orchestrated by the rival Awami League government.

Additional allegations were leveled regarding corruption in infrastructure and procurement contracts during the 2001–2006 term. For instance, the Gatco graft case was filed in September 2007 against Khaleda Zia and 14 others, alleging a loss of BDT 1.45 billion to the state through tender manipulation in gas infrastructure contracts to benefit allies. Although these investigations began during the military-backed caretaker government in 2007, they yielded mixed judicial results amid claims of weak evidence.

Bangladesh's low standing during the BNP administration was reflected in Transparency International's Corruption Perceptions Index. In 2001, the score was 15 out of 100, which improved slightly to 26 by 2006. While structural corruption has been attributed to 'elite capture' by all major parties, specific scandals associated with the BNP reinforced perceptions of nepotism in the distribution of state resources. It has been alleged that during the BNP regime, patronage networks were established to consolidate party loyalty through the appointment of family members and associates to key government positions.

== Killing of Moin Hossain Raju ==
On 13 March 1992, Moin Hossain Raju, a leader of the Bangladesh Students' Union, was killed during a gunfight between the Chatra Dal and the Chhatra League during an anti-terrorism procession on the University of Dhaka campus. Following the incident, Ruhin Hossain Prince, the then leader of the Students' Union, filed a case at Shahbagh Thana based on eyewitness accounts, naming several top leaders of the Chhatra Dal, the student wing of the then-ruling BNP, as accused.

== Tarique Rahman and the electric pole corruption allegations ==
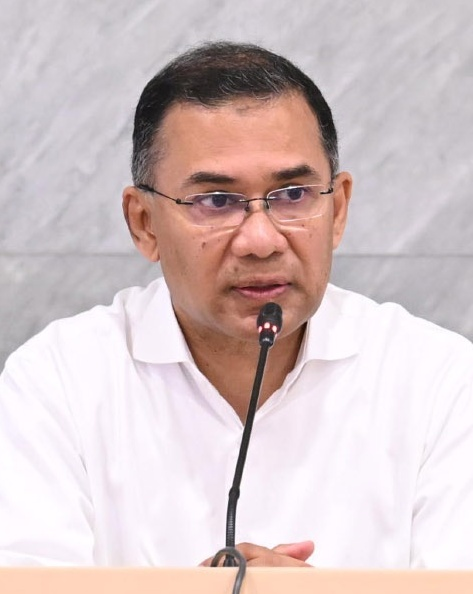
Tarique Rahman, the current Prime Minister of Bangladesh, was accused in digital money laundering case with Bangladesh Bank during 2001–2006

In a report published by Time magazine in January 2026, it was noted that to many Bangladeshis, Tarique Rahman, the son of BNP politician Ziaur Rahman, is still mockingly referred to as "Khamba Tarique" (Pillar Tarique). This nickname stems from an alleged corruption scandal originating from the 2001–2006 BNP administration, which was later highlighted during the Awami League's tenure. The allegations suggest that thousands of electric poles (locally known as khambas) were purchased at inflated prices from an associate but were never connected to the national grid. While Rahman has consistently denied any wrongdoing, a leaked 2008 U.S. diplomatic cable described him as a "symbol of kleptocratic government and violent politics," noting his notoriety for "brazenly and frequently demanding bribes."

== Hawa Bhaban ==
The political office of the BNP Chairperson and the so-called command center, known as Hawa Bhaban, became controversial during the 2006–2008 political crisis. It was alleged to have functioned as an "alternative center of power" under Tarique Rahman, the then Senior Joint Secretary General of the party and son of Chairperson Khaleda Zia.

== Killing of Lal Chand Sohag ==
On 9 July 2025, a scrap metal dealer named Lal Chand alias Sohag was brutally murdered at Mitford Hospital in Dhaka, Bangladesh. A video of the incident was widely circulated on social media, which showed the attackers stripping Sohag, stabbing him, throwing stones at him, and trampling his body. The attackers were reportedly affiliated with the BNP's youth and student wings: Chatra Dal, Jubodal and Swechhasebak Dal. The incident occurred in broad daylight and sparked widespread public outrage. In response, law enforcement authorities arrested seven suspects in connection with the case. Following nationwide criticism and protests, the BNP expelled five of its members for their alleged involvement in the incident.

== Allegations of rigging and criticism regarding the 2026 elections ==
Although the Bangladesh Nationalist Party (BNP) secured an absolute majority in the 13th National Parliamentary Election, held on 12 February 2026, the main rival party, Bangladesh Jamaat-e-Islami, and the newly formed National Citizen's Party (NCP) held separate press conferences alleging "election engineering" in specific constituencies.

Allegations surfaced that administrative influence was exerted in some polling centers to force presiding officers to sign result sheets in advance. Instances of recovering "pre-stamped ballot papers" in several centers across the Jhenaidah and Comilla regions caused a stir in the national media. While the Election Commission described these as isolated incidents and the Asian Network for Free Elections (ANFREL) deemed the election generally acceptable, opposition parties continued to criticize the polls as an "election of administrative rigging."

== Student wing violence and institutional criticism ==
=== Controversy regarding institutional committees ===
In April and May 2026, members of Jatiyatabadi Chhatra Dal alleged that former members of the banned Bangladesh Chhatra League had been included in newly formed committees at several educational institutions including Mymensingh Medical College and University of Barisal. Party activists also alleged that several long-time Chhatra Dal workers were excluded from the committees to make room for former Chhatra League affiliates.

== Controversy over the "Zia Tree" claim ==
A narrative has frequently circulated within Bangladesh Nationalist Party (BNP) circles claiming that former President Ziaur Rahman initiated a project to plant 100,000 neem trees in the plains of Arafat, Saudi Arabia, and that locals purportedly refer to these trees as "Zia Trees." This claim has been widely dismissed by independent fact-checkers and historical records as a fabrication. According to reports from Arab News, the large-scale tree plantation project in Arafat was a welfare endowment (waqf) initiative launched in 1986 by Saudi businessman Abdul Rahman Fakieh to provide shade for Hajj pilgrims. Historical documentation confirms that neem trees existed in Saudi Arabia prior to the 1940, and there is no evidence to support the narrative of Ziaur Rahman's involvement in the plantation project. In 1984, former Sudanese President Jaafar Nimeiri donated thousands of neem tree saplings, which were planted and nurtured in the sacred plains of Arafat. These trees received considerable attention from Saudi Arabian officials, who cared for them until they provided shade for a vast area of Arafat.

== See also ==
- Criticism of the Awami League
- Battle of Begums
- Human rights in Bangladesh
- Fascism
- Extortion
- Corruption in Bangladesh#Bangladesh Nationalist Party
