= Yasser =

Yasir
- Pronunciation: [ˈjaːsir]
- Gender: Male

Origin
- Origin: Arabic
- Meaning: derived from Arabic يسر (yasira): well to do; rich; one who makes things easier; to become easy

Yasser (also spelled Yaser, Yaseer, Yasir, or Yassir; Arabic: ياسر, romanized: Yāsir) is an Arabic male name meaning "to be of ease" or "of wealth".

== Given name ==
- Yasir Abdullah (born 2000), American football player
- Yaser Abdel Said (born 1957), Egyptian fugitive wanted for the murder of his two daughters
- Yasser Abd Rabbo (born 1944), Palestinian politician and Secretary-General of the PLO Executive Committee
- Yassir Abdul-Mohsen (born 1988), Iraqi football player
- Yasser Abu Shabab (1993–2025), Palestinian militia leader
- Yasser Arafat (1929–2004), Palestinian politician, Chairman of the Palestine Liberation Organization (PLO) and Nobel Peace Prize laureate
- Yasir Arafat (disambiguation), multiple people.
- Yasser al-Azma (born 1942), Syrian writer and actor
- Yasser Al-Baadani (born 1986), Yemeni football player
- Yasser Al Borhamy (born 1958), Egyptian Muslim activist and Salafist leader
- Yasser Al-Habib (born 1979), Shia Muslim Scholar and founder of Fadak TV
- Yasser Ibrahim Farag (born 1984), Egyptian shot putter
- Yasser el Halaby (born 1984), Egyptian squash player
- Yaser Kasim (born 1991), Iraqi footballer
- Yasser Khalil (born 1972), Egyptian journalist
- Yasser Al Mosailem (born 1984), Saudi Arabian football player.
- Yasir Naqvi (born 1973), Canadian politician from Ontario
- Yasir ibn Amir, known in the Islamic traditions as an early martyr
- Yasir Qadhi (born 1975), American Islamic scholar of Pakistani origin
- Yasser Al-Qahtani (born 1982), Saudi Arabian football player
- Yassir Raad (born 1983), Iraqi football player
- Omar Yaser Ismail Hantoli (born 2005), Palestinian taekwondo athlete
- Yasser Hashemi Rafsanjani (born 1971), Iranian politician
- Yaser Salem Ali (born 1977), Emirati football player
- Yasser Seirawan (born 1960), American chess grandmaster
- Yasir Shah (born 1986), Pakistani cricketer
- Yaser Shigan (born 1976), Syrian boxer
- Yassir al-Sirri, Egyptian militant
- Yaser Yıldız (born 1988), Turkish football player
- Yasser Talal Al Zahrani (1984–2006), Saudi Arabian extra-judicial prisoner of the United States

== Surname ==
- Ammar ibn Yasir (died 657), companion of the Islamic prophet Muhammad
- Emelia Yassir (born 2003), Australian footballer
- Hussein Yasser (born 1984), Egyptian-Qatari footballer
- Ramadan Yasser (born 1980), Egyptian boxer
