= Look East policy =

Look East policy may refer to:

- Look East policy (Bangladesh)
- Look East policy (India)
- Look to the East policy (Iran)
- Look East policy (Malaysia), instituted under Prime Minister Mahathir Mohamad

== See also ==
- Look East (disambiguation)
