= Killing of Lal Chand Sohag =

2025 killing in Bangladesh

Murder of Lal Chand Sohag
- Part of the Bangladesh post-resignation violence (2024–2026)
- Location: 23°42′45″N 90°24′3.5″E; Mitford Hospital, Old Dhaka, Bangladesh
- Date: 9 July 2025; 1 years ago 6 pm (UTC+6)
- Attack type: Beating • Stoning to death
- Weapons: Concrete boulder Locally made sharp weapons Pistol
- Deaths: 1
- Victim: Lal Chand Sohag
- No. of participants: 4+
- Motive: business dispute and political conflict
- Inquiry: DMP; RAB
- Accused: 8 arrested
- Charges: Murder
- CCTV footage of the murder event gone viral on social media

On 9 July 2025, Mohammad Sohag, a 39-year-old scrap dealer also known as Lal Chand, was publicly stripped, hacked, stoned to death, and his corpse stomped on in front of Mitford Hospital in Old Dhaka, Bangladesh. The graphic nature of the killing and its circulation on social media sparked widespread public outrage and ignited debates concerning the country’s political climate, social tensions, and law and order situation. The attackers were identified as members of various wings of the Bangladesh Nationalist Party, mainly Chhatra Dal and Jubo Dal which subsequently expelled them following the incident.

== Background ==
The victim, Sohag, was being extorted out of money from local Chhatra Dal and Jubo Dal leaders. After the 2024 July Revolution, one of the largest political party of Bangladesh, BNP along with their party wings, had allegations of money extortion, and other post-resignation violence.

== Event ==
The incident took place on 9 July 2025 on the main road in front of Gate No. 3 of Mitford Hospital in Old Dhaka. According to eyewitnesses and video footage, an armed group dragged Sohag from his store and threw him on the road. Then, several people hit his body and head with heavy concrete boulders. The beating continued after Sohag had died. No bystanders intervened during the beating.

Initial police investigations suggested the beating was motivated by business disputes, extortion disputes, and past enmity. According to local residents, Sohag had been involved in the scrap metal and old electrical cable business in Rajni Ghosh Lane in Old Dhaka for a long time. The dispute arose from competition for dominance in this business and the formation of syndicates.

== Investigation and charges ==
By July 2025, police arrested 9 accused involved in the incident. Three of the arrested persons admitted to being involved in the incident. In total, 19 people received an FIR.

Many of those involved in the incident were identified as members of various political wings of the Bangladesh Nationalist Party (BNP). In particular, some leaders and activists of BNP-affiliated organizations Jubo Dal, Chhatra Dal, and Swechchhasebak Dal were identified in the video footage. Immediately after this, these organizations expelled their four members for life.

=== List of Accused ===
On 12 July 2026, Dhaka First Additional Metropolitan Sessions Judge's Court indicted 21 people over the murder. Of them 10 are in custody, 3 are on bail and 8 remain at large.

Kotwali Police Station case dated 10 July 2025
No	Name of the suspect	Status
1	Md Mahmudul Hasan Mahin	Arrested
2	Md Tarek Rahman Robin (Tarek Rahman)	Arrested
3	Md Titon Gazi	Arrested
4	Md Alamgir	Arrested
5	Md Monir (Lomba Monir)	Arrested
6	Md Sajib Bepari	Arrested
7	Md Nanu Kazi	Arrested
8	Md Rizwan Uddin (Abhijit Basu)	Arrested
9	Md Zahirul Islam	Arrested
10	Md Sagar	Arrested
11	Md Ruman Bepari	Bail
12	Md Abir Hossain	Bail
13	Md Parvez	Bail
14	Md Zahirul (Jalil)	Fugitive
15	Md Imran	Fugitive
16	Md Sharafat (Shafiul Islam)	Fugitive
17	Md Ziauddin Rajib	Fugitive
18	Md Hossain Chowkidar	Fugitive
19	Md Sarwar Hossain Titu	Fugitive
20	Md Mangal Mia (Monir Hossain)	Fugitive
21	Apu Das	Fugitive

== Public reaction ==
After the video of the killing was published online, netizens on Facebook began to share it across other social media. It rapidly gained traction three days after the killing.

There were protests around different parts of the country, demanding justice for Sohag.

== Disinformation ==
News of the Sohagh killing was misrepresented in Indian media. Several Indian media outlets, including NDTV, Times of India, India TV, India Today, WION, News18, TV9, ABP, Bhaskar, and Zee News falsely claimed the deceased as a "Hindu" man. However, an investigation conducted by Rumor Scanner disclosed the victim being a Muslim.

== See also ==
- Murder of Saiful Islam Alif, similar incident in the aftermath of the July Uprising
- Murder of Biswajit Das, similar incident perpetrated by the Chhatra League activists
- Criticism of the Bangladesh Nationalist Party
