= Agriculturists Association of Bangladesh =

Professional association in Bangladesh

- Agriculturists Association of Bangladesh
- Location: Bangladesh
- Parent organization: Bangladesh Nationalist Party

Agriculturists Association of Bangladesh is a professional body of agriculturalists aligned with the Bangladesh Nationalist Party.

== History ==
The Association condemned the 15 August 2004 grenade attack targeting former Prime Minister Sheikh Hasina.

Agriculturists Association of Bangladesh President Zaved Iqbal attended the launch of Bangladesh Sammilito Peshajibi Parishad by Mahmudur Rahman, energy advisor of Prime Minister Khaleda Zia, in August 2006. This organization was meant to be an umbrella organisation for professional associations, such as the Agriculturists Association of Bangladesh, aligned with the Bangladesh Nationalist Party. More than 500 members of the association demanded the release of former Prime Minister Khaleda Zia in September 2007.

The Association attended a meeting of the Bangladesh Nationalist Party along with the Association of Engineers, Bangladesh in February 2012 led by former Prime Minister Khaleda Zia and Mahmudur Rahman, acting editor of Amar Desh. In April, it organized a discussion on Independence, democracy and Zia at Institution of Engineers, Bangladesh. In July 2014, former Prime Minister Khaleda Zia attended an iftar of the association and called for a movement to oust Prime Minister Sheikh Hasina from power.

Bangladesh Police stopped an event of the Agriculturists Association of Bangladesh in April 2016 where the chief guest was Mirza Fakhrul Islam Alamgir, general secretary of the Bangladesh Nationalist Party. Former Prime Minister Khaleda Zia attended the association's iftar and asked Prime Minister Sheikh Hasina to resign, stating she did not have a mandate from the people. In September 2019, the Association formed a program outside the Jatiya Press Club demanding the release of former Prime Minister Khaleda Zia from prison, where Moudud Ahmed said, "Now, every sector has collapsed as there's no representative government in the country. Now, the government can't control its own people who are indulging in widespread corruption,".

In February 2024, employees of Department of Livestock Services opposed Mohammad Reazul Haque Jasim proposed appointment as director general due to this connection to the Agriculturists Association of Bangladesh. Following the fall of the Sheikh Hasina-led Awami League government, the convener of the Agriculturist Association of Bangladesh Rashidul Hasan Harun and joint secretary of the Bangladesh Nationalist Party Shamimur Rahman Shamim took control of the Department of Agricultural Extension and the Krishibid Institution Bangladesh.

The Bangladesh Nationalist Party dissolved the managing committees of the Agriculturists Association of Bangladesh and the Association of Engineers, Bangladesh.
