= Arafat =

Arafat may refer to:

- Mount Arafat, visited as part of the Hajj
- Yasser Arafat (1929–2004), Chairman of the Palestine Liberation Organization (PLO), President of the Palestinian National Authority (PNA)

== People ==
=== Given name ===
- Arafat Djako (born 1988), Togolese former professional footballer
- Arafat Minhas (born 2005), Pakistani cricketer
- DJ Arafat (1986–2019), Ivorian DJ and singer who made music in the Coupé-Décalé genre

=== Surname ===
- Fathi Arafat (1933–2004), Palestinian physician
- Hisham Arafat (1964/1965–2024), Egyptian politician
- Moussa Arafat (c. 1940–2005), Palestinian politician, cousin of Yasser Arafat
- Raed Arafat (born 1964), Romanian physician
- Suha Arafat (born 1963), widow of Yasser Arafat
- Yasir Arafat (disambiguation), several people

== Places ==
- Yasser Arafat International Airport, Palestine
- Arafat, Makkah, a plain about 20 km Southeast of Mecca
- Arafat, Iran, a village in West Azerbaijan Province, Iran
- Arafat, Mauritania, a suburb of Nouakchott
- Arafat, Çınar, Turkey

== Other uses ==
- Arafat (journal), a 1946–47 Pakistani periodical covering Islamic law

== See also ==
- Day of Arafah
