= Shaukat Mahmood =

Bangladeshi journalist and politician

- শওকত মাহমুদ
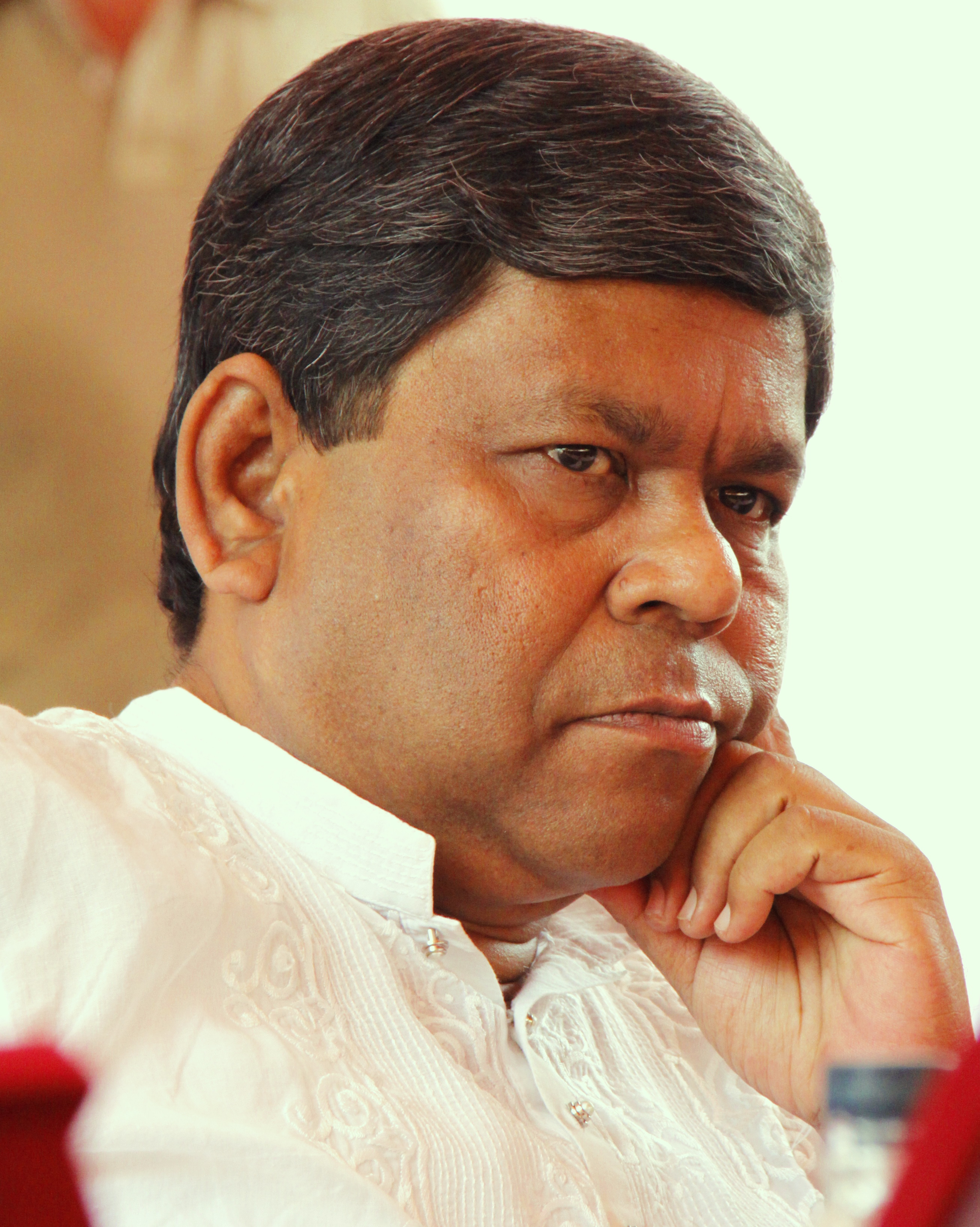
- Mahmood in 2010
- Born: 29 July 1959 (age 67) district Comilla, Upazila Brahmanpara, East Bengal, Dominion of Pakistan
- Education: University of Dhaka
- Occupations: Newspaper editor, political advisor
- Political party: Janata Party Bangladesh
- Spouse: Ferdousi Mahmood

Shaukat Mahmood (born 29 July 1959; also spelled as Shawkat Mahmud) is a Bangladeshi journalist and politician, who served as the president of the National Press Club and at the 5th National Council of Bangladesh Nationalist Party on 2009, Shaukat was selected as an adviser of former Prime Minister Begum Khaleda Zia.

Later the party named him as a vice chairman of the 6th council in August 2016. Shaukat Mahmood was expelled from BNP following allegations against him by the party members.

== Early life and education ==
Mahmood graduated from mass communication and journalism in the Dhaka University in 1980. He was awarded the fellowship of Fletcher School of Law and Diplomacy at Tufts University, Boston.

== Career in journalism ==
Mahmood's early career in journalism comprises his association as a senior staff reporter with one of the oldest left-leaning Bengali newspaper, The Sangbad. He also served as a senior journalist as well as in the panels of editorial of the dailies Dinkal, Amar Desh, Amader Shomoy and Matribhumi.

As a journalist Shaukat Mahmood presently serves as editor of Weekly Economic Times and has been an adviser of Channel One, which was shut down by the government on 27 April 2010. Mahmood was elected as the general secretary of Bangladesh Federal Union of Journalists (BFUJ) along with Ruhul A Gazi, special correspondent of The Daily Sangram, elected as the president.

In 1990 Mahmood was elected as General Secretary of the National Press Club, Dhaka. He served two consecutive terms as the general secretary. Another two terms of his being GS came in 2002 and he again held the post until 2006. In 2007, Shaukat Mahmood was elected as the president of National Press Club. The tenure ended as he stepped aside from running in the immediate next election in 2011. Mahmood presently serves as the editor of 1995-established Weekly Economic Times. He is also actively serving as an adviser of the Weekly Ekhon editorial panel.

In March 2026, Dhaka Metropolitan Magistrate Jewel Rana orded Mahmood be detained under the Anti-Terrorism Act for spreading propaganda against the Muhammad Yunus led Interim government. The order came shortly after the High Court granted him bail in a separate case filed at Ramna Police Station, in which he had been in custody since Dec 6, 2025, and he was sent back to jail under the new charges.

== Politics ==
Mahmood's official entry into politics took place after the party's December 2008 council named him as an adviser to the chairperson of Bangladesh Nationalist Party.

- After being appointed as Advisor to the former Prime Minister Khaleda Zia, the duty was included in the Vice Chairman of the Central Committee of the 6th Council after performing this duty. Earlier, from 2012 to 2016, His own, Upazila's Brahmanpara unit of Comilla was the convenor of the BNP.....

Upon the appointment, Mahmood actively took part in the grass-root conferences of the party in Khulna, Jessore, Barisal and Mymensingh.

Mahmood was nominated as a vice-chairman of BNP at the 6th party council held in August 2016.
