= Look East =

Look East may refer to:

- Look East policy (disambiguation)
- BBC Look East, a regional television news programme for the East of England
