= Bangladesh Sammilito Peshajibi Parishad =

Pro-BNP professional body in Bangladesh

- Bangladesh Sammilito Peshajibi Parishad
- বাংলাদেশ সম্মিলিত পেশাজীবী পরিষদ
- Location: Bangladesh
- Parent organization: Bangladesh Nationalist Party

Bangladesh Sammilito Peshajibi Parishad (Bengali: বাংলাদেশ সম্মিলিত পেশাজীবী পরিষদ) is a professional body aligned with the Bangladesh Nationalist Party. It is composed of 19 professional associations linked to the Bangladesh Nationalist Party.

== History ==
Bangladesh Sammilito Peshajibi Parishad was established on 16 August 2006 by Mahmudur Rahman, energy advisor to Prime Minister and Chairperson of the Bangladesh Nationalist Party Khaleda Zia. Sammilito Peshajibi Parishad was established to "uphold the spirit of the Liberation War". The next day Rahman alleged a vested quarter was trying to harm the government's image at the press conference of the Parishad in the National Press Club.

In July 2010, the Parishad demanded release of Mahmudur Rahman and withdrawal of call cases filed against him.

Bangladesh Sammilito Peshajibi Parishad an event in 2013 demanding the government release Mahmudur Rahman and hold elections under a neutral caretaker government. The speakers at the event included Emajuddin Ahmed, Khandaker Mustahidur Rahman, Farhad Mazhar and Pias Karim.

In April 2015, Bangladesh Sammilito Peshajibi Parishad, then led by journalist Ruhul Amin Gazi, opposed the formation of a new platform for professionals to be led by Emajuddin Ahmed to influence the upcoming Dhaka and Chittagong mayoral elections. They informed former Prime Minister Khaleda Zia in a meeting led by Ruhul Amin Gazi.

In March 2022, the acting convener of the Parishad Shawkat Mahmud called a protest of the Parishad against the government which was not attended by other leaders such as AZM Zahid Hossain. The Bangladesh Nationalist Party was suspicious of the program, believing it could be a conspiracy to divide the party.

Bangladesh Sammilito Peshajibi Parishad organized protests in November 2023 demanding the cancellation of the upcoming national election, where the chief quest was Tazmeri S. A. Islam, advisor to Khaleda Zia. On 4 August 2024, more than 100 were injured in clashes between the activists of Bangladesh Sammilito Peshajibi Parishad, who were protesting against Sheikh Hasina, and Bangladesh Police.
