= Bangladesh Jatiotabadi Chatra Dal =

Bangladeshi student organisation

Bangladesh Jatiotabadi Chatra Dal বাংলাদেশ জাতীয়তাবাদী ছাত্রদল
- BJCD Emblem
- President: Rakibul Islam Rakib
- General Secretary: Nasir Uddin
- Founded: 1 January 1979; 47 years ago
- Headquarters: 28/1, Naya Paltan, VIP Road, Dhaka
- Ideology: Bangladeshi nationalism National liberalism
- Colours: Red, Green
- Mother party: Bangladesh Nationalist Party
- Slogan: Bangladesh Zindabad ('Long Live Bangladesh')
- Website: jcd.org.bd

Flag

Bangladesh Jatiotabadi Chhatra Dal (Bengali: বাংলাদেশ জাতীয়তাবাদী ছাত্রদল), commonly known as Chhatra Dal (abbreviated as JCD), is the student wing of the Bangladesh Nationalist Party (BNP). It serves as a significant recruiting ground for the party, with many of the current top BNP leaders and policy-makers having started their political careers as student leaders within the organization.

== History and organisation ==
After the Bangladesh Nationalist Party was founded by Ziaur Rahman, he realized a strong student organization was needed to cherish future BNP leaders; consequently, established Chatradal on January 1, 1979. Chatradal has adopted the 19-point programme, based on the mother party BNP's structure and approach. Chatradal was one of the vanguard organisations in the pro-democratic mass uprising against military ruler Hussain Muhammad Ershad.

Bangladesh Jatiotabadi Chatradal is led by a committee, of whom all the members are students. Chatradal has 736 members in the national committee. The committee formed in 2016 came under criticism from party activists for including nonstudents and people with criminal cases filed against them; despite former Chairperson of BNP, Khaleda Zia forbidding it. It also had members, who were victims of forced disappearances.

== Political violence ==
In 2004, members of JCD harassed the NGO Proshika, resulting in damage to its headquarters and two local offices in Mehdiganj, Barisal. These events occurred under the then coalition government. On 11 September 2004, JCD activists targeted opposition student groups, journalists, and vandalized the office of Dhaka University Teachers Association president AAMS Arefin Siddique. Additionally, on 15 October 2015, a conflict between Chatradal and Chhatrashibir at BL College in Daulatpur led to the deployment of Border Guard Bangladesh and riot police.

In 2002, Sony, a student of Bangladesh University of Engineering and Technology, was killed in a shootout between two factions of Chatradal. On 19 November 2006, JCD members attacked and injured five activists of Chhatra Sangram Parishad and detonated bombs at Dhaka University. The police filed cases against 150 JCD activists for attacking law enforcement during factional protests in Sylhet. On 9 November 2008, Ashraful Islam Pintu, the president of the Jhenaidah unit of JCD, was arrested with a gun and bomb.

On 19 January 2010, factional clashes within Chatradal resulted in injuries to 25 people, including a proctor and four police officers. On 12 December 2010, 200 JCD activists attacked their own headquarters in Naya Paltan over the formation of a unit committee. Saiduzzaman Pasha, a Dhaka University JCD activist, was arrested on 28 January 2010 after photos of him armed with a gun during factional clashes emerged; he faced several criminal charges, including extortion.

On 26 May 2013, JCD members vandalized 25 vehicles during protests in support of Tarique Rahman in Dhaka. On 15 August 2013, JCD engaged in factional clashes during Khaleda Zia's birthday celebration in Chittagong, damaging private property. On 28 November 2013, JCD attacked a demonstration by the Bangladesh Awami League's student wing Bangladesh Chhatra League in Narsingdi, resulting in the deaths of two Chhatra League members.

On 9 July 2025, a scrap trader named Lal Chand Sohag was killed on the premises of Mitford Hospital in Dhaka. A video of the incident, which circulated widely on social media, showed Sohag being hacked, stoned, and his dead body being stomped on. The attackers were reportedly affiliated with the Jatiotabadi Jubodal, Swechhasebak Dal, and Chatra Dal—the youth and student wings of the Bangladesh Nationalist Party (BNP). The incident occurred in broad daylight and drew widespread public condemnation. In response, law enforcement authorities arrested four suspects in connection with the case. The BNP subsequently expelled five members allegedly involved in the incident, following nationwide criticism and protests.

On 21 April 2026, a clash occurred between Chhatradal and Chhatra Shibir at Chattogram City College, during which one leg of a Shibir member was severed.

On October 4, 2026, ten Chhatra Dal activists armed with local weapons like machetes, cleavers, hockey sticks, and bats attacked journalists at Rajshahi University. Among the injured, the condition of four journalists were in serious condition.

== List of presidents and general secretaries ==
	Presidents	Later role/Affiliation	General secretaries	Later role/Affiliation
1	Enamul Karim Shahid		Dr. A.K.M. Golam Hossain	Professor, Dept of Government and Politics, Jahangirnagar University
2	Golam Sarwar Milon	Ex MP, Jatiya Party		
3	Shamsuzzaman Dudu	Vice-chairman, Ex MP BNP		
4	Jalal Ahmed			
5	Dr. Asaduzzaman Ripon	Vice-chairman, BNP	Amanullah Aman	Joint Secretary General, BNP Ex State Minister
6	Amanullah Aman	Joint Secretary General, BNP Ex State Minister		
7	Ruhul Kabir Rizvi	Joint Secretary General, Spokesperson, BNP	Ilias Ali	Ex MP, BNP
8	AKM Fazlul Haque Milon	President, Gazipur District BNP, Ex MP		
9	Shahid Uddin Chowdhury Anee	Joint Secretary General, BNP, Ex MP	Habib-Un-Nabi Sohel	Joint Secretary General, BNP
10	Habib-Un-Nabi Sohel	Joint Secretary General, BNP		
11	Nasiruddin Ahmed Pintu	Ex MP, BNP	Shahabuddin Laltu	
12	Shahabuddin Laltu		Azizul Bari Helal	Information Secretary, BNP
13	Azizul Bari Helal	Information Secretary, BNP	Shafiul Bari Babu	President, Jatiotabadi Swecchasebok Dol, BNP
14	Sultan Salahuddin Tuku	President, Bangladesh Jatiotabadi Jubo Dal	Amirul Islam Khan Alim	Assistant Publicity and Publications Secretary, BNP
15	Abdul Kader Jewel Bhuiyan	General Secretary, Swechhasebak Dal	Habibur Rashid Habib	
16	Md. Razib Ahsan	General Secretary, Swechhasebak Dal	Akramul Hasan	
17	Fazlur Rahman Khokon	Member National Executive Committee, BNP	Iqbal Hossain Shyamol	
18	Kazi Rawnakul Islam		Saif Mahmud Jewel	
19	Rakibul Islam Rakib		Nasir Uddin Nasir	

== Controversies ==
In April 2026, Asaduzzaman Fuad, the General Secretary of Amar Bangladesh Party claimed that banned Chhatra League members are secretly infiltrating Chhatra Dal for creating instability.

== See also ==
- Politics of Bangladesh
- Bangladesh Nationalist Party
- Bangladesh Islami Chhatra Shibir
- Bangladesh Chhatra League
- Criticism of Bangladesh Nationalist Party
