= Bangladesh Jatiotabadi Jubodal =

Youth wing of Bangladesh Nationalist Party

Bangladesh Jatiotabadi Jubodal বাংলাদেশ জাতীয়তাবাদী যুবদল
- President: Abdul Monayem Munna
- General Secretary: Mohammad Nurul Islam
- Founded: October 27, 1978; 47 years ago
- Headquarters: 28/1, Naya Paltan, VIP Road, Dhaka
- Ideology: Liberalism; Conservatism
- Position: Centre
- Mother party: Bangladesh Nationalist Party
- Slogan: Bangladesh Zindabad ('Long Live Bangladesh')

The Bangladesh Jatiotabadi Jubodal (Bengali: বাংলাদেশ জাতীয়তাবাদী যুবদল, lit. 'Bangladesh Nationalist Youth Party') commonly known as Jubodal, is the youth wing of the Bangladesh Nationalist Party (BNP).

== History ==
Bangladesh Jatiotabadi Jubodal was established on 27 August 1978.

On 23 November 2003, the group Hassan Bahini, followers of Jubo Dal Jhalokati District unit president Mir Ziauddin Mizan, attacked the residence of Jubo League leader, Saidur Rahman Khan Swapan, and injured five of his family members.

Five members of Jubodal were injured in internal clashes in Barisal in September 2008.

In March 2010, Syed Moazzem Hossain Alal was appointed president of the Jubodal and Saiful Alam Nirob its general secretary. Alal replaced Barkat Ullah Bulu, who had served as president of the wing since 2003.

Jubodal activist Saifuzzaman Sujan was killed on 2 December 2013 in a gunfight with Awami League activists. On 3 December, a Jubo League activist was killed in Comilla District and another was killed in Bogra District. A Jessore Jubodal leader was killed on 17 December. On 20 December, Afzal Hossain, vice president of the Baharbunia Union unit of Jubodal, was murdered.

On 14 August 2015, Md Wasim, a leader of Chittagong City Jubodal, was killed, allegedly by Awami League activists.

On 25 April 2017, Jony Ali, a Dhaka Jubodal leader was beaten to death in Sakura Restaurant and bar by staff members. A Jubodal leader, Md Harun, was shot dead by Awami League activists in December 2017. Harun was the owner of ST Transport and had spoked against extortion by the Chhatra League, the student front of the Awami League.

Mizanur Rahman, a leader of Comilla District unit of Jubodal was killed in the Ibrahimpur neighborhood of the capital Dhaka on 15 October 2018.

Shajahan Ali, secretary of Pabna District branch of Jubodal, was found dead after going missing on 7 April 2021 in Atghoria Upazila. On 27 October 2021, the president of the Noakhali District unit of Jubodal, Manjurul Azim Sumon Prokash alias GS Sumon, was arrested from Rangamati District for being involved in attacks on the minority Hindu community in Noakhali.

In February 2022, the Jubodal and Jubo League clashed in Ashulia, Savar over disputes regarding the television cable business, injuring 25. Jubo Dal leader Md Shajahan died in Chittagong Central Jail in March while awaiting trial in six criminal cases. In May 2022, Sultan Salahuddin Tuku, the previous general secretary and former president of Bangladesh Jatiotabadi Chatradal, BNP-affiliated student organisation, was appointed president of Jubo Dal replacing Saiful Alam Nirob.

== Controversies ==
On 9 July 2025, a scrap trader named Lal Chand Sohag was killed on the premises of Mitford Hospital in Dhaka, Bangladesh. A video of the incident, which circulated widely on social media, showed Sohag being hacked, stoned, and his dead body being stomped on. The attackers were reportedly affiliated with the Jatiotabadi Jubodal, Swechhasebak Dal, and Chatra Dal—the youth and student wings of the Bangladesh Nationalist Party (BNP). The incident occurred in broad daylight and drew widespread public condemnation. In response, law enforcement authorities arrested four suspects in connection with the case. The BNP subsequently expelled five members allegedly involved in the incident, following nationwide criticism and protests.

Following the return of Jubo Dal activists to local politics after the political transition following the July Uprising, the members of the party faced criticism over the increase in clashes with Islami Chhatra Shibir in different parts of the country. The clashes, largely over local political dominance, resulted in several casualties.
