= 5th National Council of the Bangladesh Nationalist Party =

2009 Bangladesh Nationalist Party conference

- Logo
- Date: 8 December 2009 (16 years ago)
- Location: Bangladesh China Friendship Conference Center, Sher-e-Bangla Nagar, Dhaka, Bangladesh
- Participants: 12,000 representatives (40 from each of 300 constituencies; including 2,512 councillors elected from lower level party units)
- Outcome: Election of the National Standing Committee of the Bangladesh Nationalist Party
- Website: bnpcouncil2009.com

The 5th National Council of the Bangladesh Nationalist Party (Bengali: বাংলাদেশ জাতীয়তাবাদী দলের ৫ম জাতীয় কাউন্সিল) was a central party conference that elected the topmost panel of the policy-making bodies of Bangladesh Nationalist Party (BNP), held on 8 December 2009 at Bangladesh China Friendship Conference Center in Sher-e-Bangla Nagar, Dhaka. According to the party constitution, which was amended lastly on 16 August 2009, the panel of policy-making bodies and other administrative bodies would be active until a next council takes place and elects a new set of leaders to replace the existing one.

== Events ==
The National Executive Committee of the party includes 251 members holding 45 different positions including the chairperson and vice-presidents of the party. The council attempted to elect at least one-third of the required members to form the executive policy-making body.

A delegation of 40 members, comprising mostly the senior regional leaders, leaders of the branch organizations and dignified activists from each of 300 constituencies was invited to be part of the council.

Out of the total of 12,000, a set of 2,512 leaders were set to chair as the councillors. The election process was driven by the evaluations and polls from these councillors.

Invitees included people from a minimum of 60 other countries, including observers and analysts, local and foreign journalists, and representatives from multiple political and other organizations.

Approximately 33% of the executive body were women.

=== Tarique Rahman ===
The Senior Joint Secretary General of the organization Tarique Rahman who has been recently elected a Senior Vice Chairman, addressed to the audience as the video recorded from his Edmonton, London residence was played in the event. Many among the audience were reportedly found failing to hold tears while Tareq was describing his days of being persecuted, imprisoned and tortured. Tarique Rahman notified about his physical condition and confirmed the protraction of his pause from political activities.

=== George Galloway ===
British politician George Galloway addressed to the audience clarifying that Bangladesh requires a friendly relationship with India for its own interest, but no room should be offered to a compromise in the Tipaimukh dam issue. He stated that the Tipaimukh Dam issue should be made a discussion of the United Nations Climate Change Conference 2009 at Copenhagen. Galloway also announced that Britain will break its silence if any injustice is imposed on Bangladesh on the Tipaimukh dam flap.

=== Delegation from Bangladesh Awami League ===
Awami League that occupies a position of the largest opponent of BNP, sent a delegation of four to the council led by Ashim Kumar Ukil MP, organization's Secretary of Media Affairs. Ashim Kumal Ukil MP greeted Begum Khaleda Zia on behalf of the Prime Minister and Awami League President Sheikh Hasina. In his address, he claimed that as a major party, BNP needs to strengthen beyond limit, to enhance the democracy of Bangladesh and Bangladesh Awami League, while also adding that the government completely supports its council to be a success.

=== Election Commission ===
The Election Commission Secretariat expressed praise to the successful National Council of BNP. In fact, it was the Election Commission itself that amended certain rules, encouraging registered political parties to conduct successful councils and to continue their operation under the officials' approval.

== Reactions ==
The emergence of a National Council of the party after 16 years was a matter of widespread anticipations, provoking various reactions.

Many considered the initiative being largely successful. Observers, including representatives of the rival Awami League, praised the organized way of managing the event. However, some reviews suggest that the council's magnitude and the participation of its instruments, international observers, political representatives and the media, were unable to reflect the distress the party has been under for last three years, both in terms of organization and unity of the leaders.

Regardless, the council could not evade criticism arising from critics and the general mass. An online poll by The Daily Star reveals 64.4% of its online readers do not agree that BNP's 5th national council displayed any qualitative changes in the party. After a meeting of the Central Working Committee of Awami League, its leaders remarked that the council has been a part of the wrong politics of Bangladesh Nationalist Party. The council also received much criticism as it empowered re-elected party chair-person, Khaleda Zia, to pick other members for the National Executive Committee and Standing Committee, ignoring the party charter that stipulates election to the posts. Furthermore, the critics commented that the BNP National Council electing Khaleda Zia's son, Tarique Rahman, as a powerful Senior Vice-chairman, seemed like a move aimed to facilitate his path to the party leadership.

According to the new party charter passed by the national council of BNP, war criminals convicted under Bangladesh Collaborators (Special Tribunals) Order, 1972 can now have membership or leadership of BNP's committees at any level and even get BNP nominations for contesting in parliamentary elections as the party has deleted the barring provision from its constitution. War Crimes Fact Finding Committee, an organization advocating the movement against war-crimes committed amid the 1971 Independence struggle reveals, "By deleting the provision from its constitution, BNP is encouraging war criminals unethically to do politics".

== See also ==
- Politics of Bangladesh
- List of political parties in Bangladesh
- Elections in Bangladesh
