= Look East policy (Bangladesh) =

Bangladeshi Foreign Policy promoting relations with East and Southeast Asian States

Look East policy refers to the foreign policy of Bangladesh which is designed to promote its relations with East and Southeast Asian countries covering economic, defence, cultural and other interests.

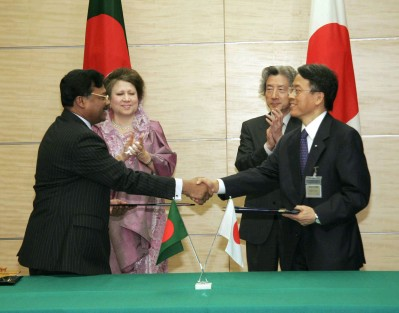
Koizumi and Zia in 2005

== Policy ==
The policy aims to improve ties with East Asian countries. This includes signing more bilateral treaties with Japan and China. The government of Bangladesh is also trying to increase economic trade and improve relations with Myanmar and Thailand.

== History ==
The policy was adopted in 2001 after the Bangladesh Nationalist Party led by Khaleda Zia was elected. Khaleda Zia said "The doors are open to us in the west, east, south and north but we are focussing on the east because it is good for us". Bangladesh was motivated by a lack of progress in trade deals with SAARC countries and perceived domination of India, which borders Bangladesh on all sides and has a trade surplus with it. In 2016, China signed a memorandum of understanding to provide Bangladesh with 24.45 billion USD in bilateral assistance to 34 projects in Bangladesh. This was to date the largest assistance pledged to Bangladesh by any country. China is Bangladesh's biggest source of Imports and the largest trading partner.
