= Arafat, Iran =

Arafat عرفات
- Village
- Location within Iran
- Coordinates: 39°02′04″N 44°37′12″E
- Country: Iran
- Province: West Azerbaijan
- County: Chaldoran
- Bakhsh: Central
- Rural District: Baba Jik

Population (2006)
  - Total: 180
- Time zone: UTC+3:30 (IRST)
  - Summer (DST): UTC+4:30 (IRDT)

Arafat (Persian: عرفات, also Romanized as ‘Arafāt) is a village in Baba Jik Rural District, in the Central District of Chaldoran County, West Azerbaijan Province, Iran. At the 2006 census, its population was 180, in 37 families.
