= Yasir Arafat (disambiguation) =

Yasser Arafat (1929–2004) was a Palestinian leader.

Yasir Arafat may also refer to:

- Yasir Arafat (cricketer), (born 1982) Pakistani Test cricketer
- Yasir Arafat (cricketer, born 1984), Pakistani first-class cricketer
- Yasser Arafat International Airport
- Yasir Arafat (Gangster), slain Lyari Gangster and brother of slain Lyari Gangster Arshad Pappu

== See also ==
- Yasir Arafat Mishu (born 1998), Bangladeshi cricketer
