= Bangladesh Nationalist Party =

Political party in Bangladesh

Bangladesh Nationalist Party বাংলাদেশ জাতীয়তাবাদী দল
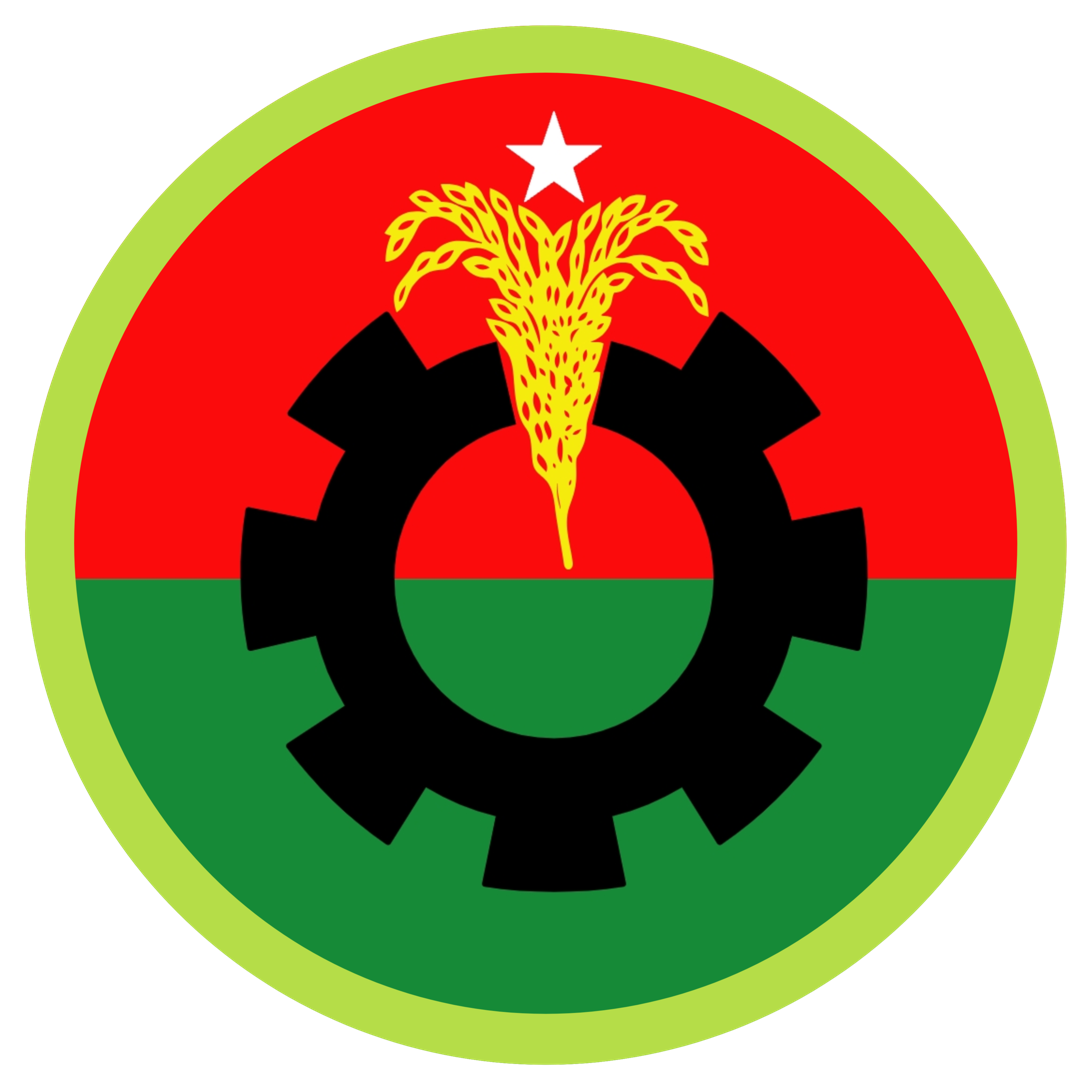
- Abbreviation: BNP; Nationalist Party
- Chairman: Tarique Rahman
- Secretary-General: Ruhul Kabir Rizvi (acting)
- Standing Committee: National Standing Committee
- Spokesperson: Ruhul Kabir Rizvi
- Founder: Ziaur Rahman
- Founded: 1 September 1978; 48 years ago
- Preceded by: Jatiyatabadi Ganatantrik Dal (Note: The Jatiyatabadi Ganatantrik Dal (JAGODAL) was the principle predecessor of BNP. Other predecessors includes factions of the Labour Party, the Muslim League, Scheduled Caste Federation, NAP (Bhashani), UPP and several other factions of the Jatiyatabadi Front.)
- Headquarters: 28/1, Naya Paltan, VIP Road, Dhaka
- Newspaper: The Daily Dinkal
- Student wing: Bangladesh Jatiotabadi Chatra Dal
- Youth wing: Bangladesh Jatiotabadi Jubodal
- Women's wing: Bangladesh Jatiotabadi Mohila Dal
- Trade union: Bangladesh Jatiotabadi Sramik Dal
- Farmer wing: Bangladesh Jatiotabadi Krishak Dal
- Volunteer wing: Bangladesh Jatiotabadi Swechhasebak Dal
- Ideology: Conservatism (Bangladeshi); Economic liberalism; Neoliberalism; Liberalism (Bangladeshi)
- Political position: Centre to centre-right
- National affiliation: None Former: Jatiyatabadi Front (1978); 7 Party Alliance; (1983–1999); 4 Party Alliance; (1999–2012); 20 Party Alliance; (2012–2022); Jatiya Oikya Front; (2018–2022)
- International affiliation: Centrist Democrat International
- Colors: Red Green (national colours) (Note: Red and green, the colours of the national flag of Bangladesh is used on the official party website.); Sky blue (customary)
- Slogan: Bangladesh Zindabad; ('Long Live Bangladesh') Others: Shaheed Zia Amar Houk; ('May Martyr Zia be Immortal'); Khaleda Zia Zindabad; ('Long Live Khaleda Zia'); Ma, Mati, Manush; ('Mother, Soil, People'); Sobar Age Bangladesh; ('Bangladesh Before All'); Take Back Bangladesh; Bangladesh First
- Anthem: "Prothom Bangladesh"; ('First Bangladesh')
- Jatiya Sangsad: 246 / 350
- Mayors: 1 / 1 (Note: Except Chattogram, mayoral post has been dissolved in all other city corporations of the country)
- Councillors: Post dissolved
- District councils: Post dissolved
- Subdistrict councils: Post dissolved
- Union councils: Post dissolved
- Municipalities: Post dissolved

Election symbol
- Sheaf of Paddy

Party flag

Website
- bnpbd.org

The Bangladesh Nationalist Party, (Note: Bengali: বাংলাদেশ জাতীয়তাবাদী দল, romanized: Bāṅlādēś Jātīẏôtābādī Dôl, pronounced [ˈbaŋlaˌdeʃ ˈdʒati̯oˌtabadi dɔl]) abbreviated as BNP, is a major centre to centre-right political party in Bangladesh. It was founded by the former president Ziaur Rahman in 1978, adhering the ideology of Bangladeshi nationalism. It is one of the two contemporary mainstream parties in the country, alongside the Bangladesh Jamaat-e-Islami, and the ruling party since 2026.

It was Known as the "Party of the Freedom Fighters of the Battlefield" during its establishment, the Bangladesh Nationalist Party was founded on 1 September 1978 by President Ziaur Rahman and remained in his leadership until he was assassinated in 1981. Following Rahman's assassination, his widow, Khaleda Zia, took over leadership of the party and presided as chairperson until her imprisonment in 2018. From 2018 until 2025, Tarique Rahman, the son of Rahman and Zia, ran the affairs of the party as the acting chairperson. Upon Zia's death in 2025, Rahman became the chairperson of the party.

Since its founding, the BNP has won the 1981, 1991, and 2001 presidential elections, and the 1979, 1991, February 1996, 2001, and 2026 general elections. BNP members Ziaur Rahman, Abdus Sattar, Abdur Rahman Biswas, A. Q. M. Badruddoza Chowdhury, and Muhammad Jamiruddin Sircar have served as the country's president, while Mashiur Rahman, Shah Azizur Rahman, Khaleda Zia, and Tarique Rahman have served as the country's prime minister. Ziaur Rahman-led governments formed under the semi-presidential system and the parliamentary republics were led by Khaleda Zia, who served as prime minister. Khaleda Zia, who served as the party's chairperson from 1983, became the first woman prime minister of Bangladesh and the second female prime minister of a Muslim-majority country after Pakistan's Benazir Bhutto. The party holds the record of being the largest opposition in the history of parliamentary elections of the country with 116 seats in the June 1996 general election.

A big tent party, the BNP espouses a stance that combines a sense of national pride with a commitment to traditional values, while emphasising advancing the interests of corporations. It maintains a solid stance on relations with India while also embracing a blend of moderate Islam and traditional Bengali culture. The party has faced sustained criticism for corruption, political violence, and poor governance, particularly during its 2001–2006 tenure, with controversies such as the 2004 Dhaka grenade attack, the 2004 arms and ammunition haul in Chittagong, and Hawa Bhaban's alleged role as a parallel power center. The party's affiliated wings have been repeatedly accused of extortion and violence, including a 2025 daylight murder linked to its student and youth fronts, further deepening public discontent and damaging the BNP's reputation. As of 2026, the Bangladesh Nationalist Party's strongest demographics include working-age voters, farmers, labourers, Sufis, Ahmadis, Hindus, and indigenous peoples of the Chittagong Hill Tracts.

== History ==
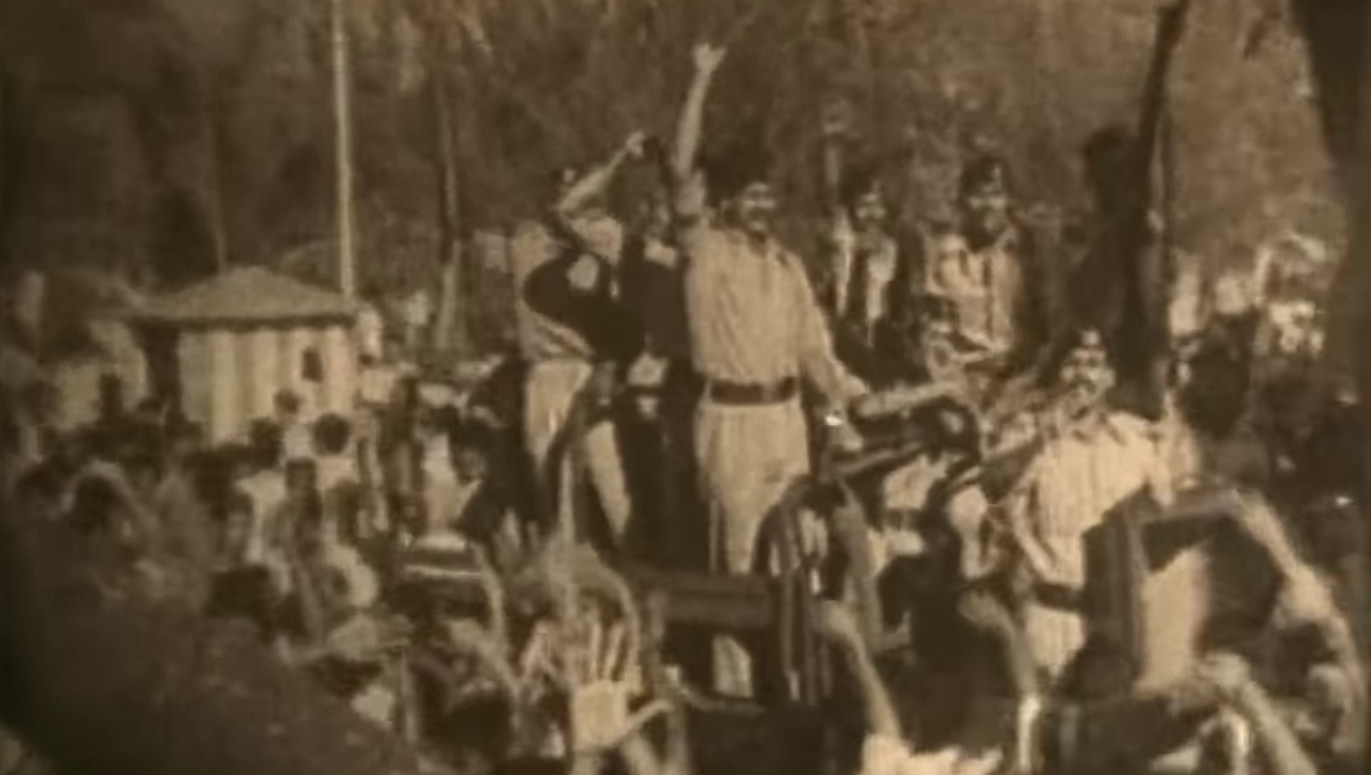
The Sipahi–Janata Revolution, which paved the way for Ziaur Rahman's entrance to power and subsequently led to the establishment of the Bangladesh Nationalist Party. The party considers it as one of their foundational events.

=== Bangladesh after independence ===
After the independence of Bangladesh, chaos and power struggles between different groups ensued. Political murders became a common thing, and productivity of key industries did not return to the pre-independence level. Despite the funnelling of million dollar-worth of aid, Bangladesh was in acute shortage of foreign currency, and political patronage made it difficult to distribute the aid to the poorest quintile of the citizens. In 1974, after a devastating flood despite the availability of food grains, a famine began that killed around a million. Sheikh Mujibur Rahman, the then Prime Minister of Bangladesh, in a desperate bid to save the situation, amended the constitution and "institutionalized autocracy" by making him effectively the "unimpeachable" President and curtailed the freedom of the judiciary and press.

Eight months after the constitutional amendment, he was killed along with his family members in a pre-dawn coup on August 15, 1975, that threw the country into deeper turmoil. A section of his colleagues from the Awami League, backed by his killers, took charge of the state under the leadership of Khondaker Mostaq Ahmed, his longtime friend.

On November 3, a counter-coup led by the Chief of General Staff of the Bangladesh Army, Brigadier General Khaled Mosharraf put the Chief of Army, Major General Ziaur Rahman, under house arrest, made himself the chief of the army, and replaced President Mostaq Ahmed with his nominee Abu Sadat Mohammad Sayem. But before he could consolidate his grip over the situation, 7 November 1975 was staged orchestrated by retired Lt. Colonel Abu Taher on November 7, but by followers of Zia within the army, freed Zia and reinstated him as the chief of army staff.

=== Military administration and presidential crisis ===
After the uprising of November 7, a military administration was formed, with President Abu Sadat Mohammad Sayem as the chief martial law administrator. Ziaur Rahman, the chief of the Army, became a deputy chief martial law administrator along with the two other chiefs of the Navy and Air Force. However, Bangladesh's constitution did not have any provision for these arrangements.

President Sayem formed a board of advisors to run the country where Zia was bestowed with the portfolio of Finance, Home affairs, Information and Broadcasting. The new president declared a date for the national election. However, most of the political parties were against the election, as they were largely unprepared compared to their rival BAKSAL. This made the situation difficult for the president.

In early 1977, the president was diagnosed with a problem in his gallbladder, and his doctor advised him to go for long rest, compelling him to think of retiring from his position. On April 20 of the year, his advisors, led by Abdus Sattar came to see him and advised him to resign in favour of Ziaur Rahman. President Sayem summoned Ziaur Rahman and requested Zia to replace him as President.

On April 21, President Sayem resigned, and transferred the presidency of Bangladesh to Ziaur Rahman.

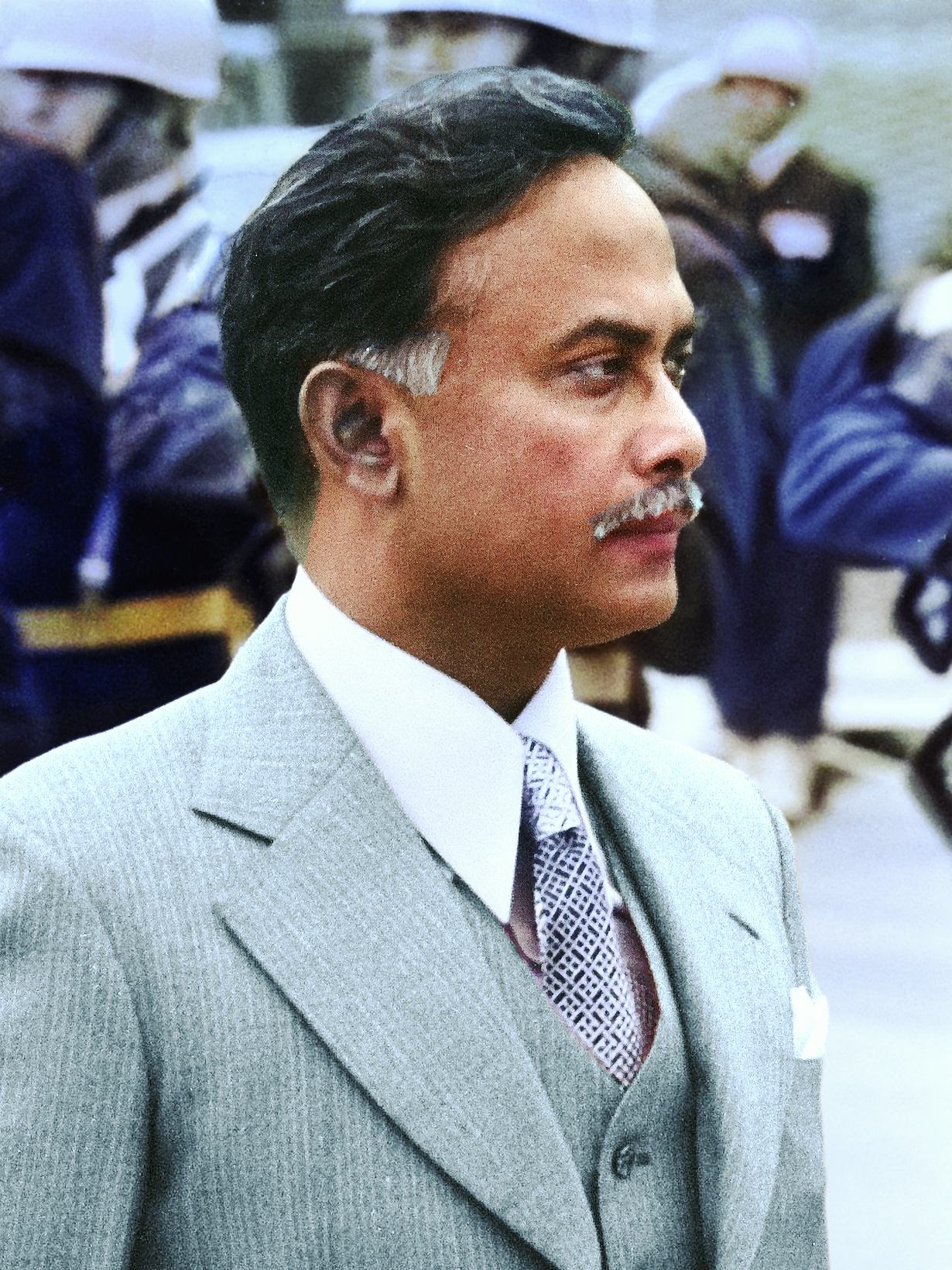
Founder of BNP, President Ziaur Rahman

=== Predecessors ===
==== Jatiyatabadi Ganatantrik Dal ====
On 22 February 1978, a new party, Jatiyatabadi Ganatantrik Dal (JAGODAL), was formed with Justice Abdus Sattar as the coordinator. Most of the prominent figures were from the advisory council that was running the country at that time. It was the first attempt to create a platform for the country's nationalists. Major General (retd) M. Majid ul Haq, Professor Syed Ali Ahsan, Shamsul Alam Chowdhury, A.Z.M. Enayetullah Khan, M. Hamidullah Khan, Jakaria Chowdhury, Professor Dr. M. R. Khan, and Saifur Rahman were prominent figures. JAGODAL was dissolved on 28 August 1978 to consolidate its membership under the Jatiyatabadi Front.

==== Jatiyatabadi Front ====
On 1 May 1978, the Jatiyatabadi Front or Nationalist Front was formed with Ziaur Rahman as the front's chief, and JAGODAL joined soon after its formation. A major portion of NAP (Bhashani) joined the front as well with Mashiur Rahman. The election symbol of NAP (Bhashani), a sheaf of paddy, would become the symbol of the BNP. Shah Azizur Rahman with some of his colleagues from Muslim League. Kazi Zafar Ahmed and a faction of the United Peoples Party, Maulana Matin with his Labour Party, and minority leader Rashraj Mandal with Tafsili Jati Federation also joined.

Ziaur Rahman was their candidate for the presidential election of 3 June 1978. Ziaur Rahman won the election, defeating M. A. G. Osmani of Ganatantrik Oikya Jote (United Democratic Alliance), which was backed by the Bangladesh Awami League.

=== Establishment ===
The Bangladesh Nationalist Party (BNP) was established on 1 September. The newly established party soon emerged as a "hotchpotch" of leftists, rightists, opportunists, and Pakistan-era establishmenterians.

The constitution of the party was drafted within 21 days of the formation with 76 members with Ziaur Rahman as the chief convener, M. Hamidullah Khan as the Executive Secretary and Dr. A. Q. M. Badruddoza Chowdhury was appointed as the Secretary-General.

Founding convening committee
  - Ziaur Rahman
  - Justice Abdus Sattar
  - Syed Masud Roomy
  - Mashiur Rahman
  - M. Hamidullah Khan
  - Shah Azizur Rahman
  - Mohammad Mohammadullah
  - Abdul Halim Chowdhury
  - Rashraj Mandal
  - Abdul Momen Khan
  - Mirza Ghulam Hafiz
  - Major General (retd.) Majid-ul-Haq
  - Brigadier (retd.) Nurul Islam Shishu
  - Captain (retd.) Nurul Huq
  - Mohammad Saifur Rahman
  - K. M. Obaidur Rahman
  - Moudud Ahmed
  - Shamsul Huda Chaudhury
  - A.Z.M. Enayetullah Khan
  - S. A. Bari
  - Dr. Amina Rahman
  - Abdur Rahman
  - Dr. M. A. Matin
  - Abdul Alim
  - Barrister Abul Hasnat
  - Anwar Hossain Manju
  - Jamal Uddin Ahmed
  - Dr. A. Q. M. Badruddoza Chowdhury
  - Nur Mohammad Khan
  - Abdul Karim
  - Shamsul Bari
  - Mojibur Rahman
  - Dr. Faridul Huda
  - Sheikh Ali Ashraf
  - Abdur Rahman Biswas
  - Barrister Abdul Huq
  - Imran Ali Sarker
  - Dewan Sirajul Huq
  - Emdadur Rahman
  - M. Afsar Uddin
  - Kabir Chowdhury
  - Dr. M. R. Khan
  - Captain (Retd.) Sujat Ali
  - Tushar Kanti Baroi
  - Sunil Kumar Gupta
  - Anisur Rahman
  - Abul Kashem
  - Mansur Ali Sarker
  - Abdul Hamid Chowdhury
  - Mansur Ali
  - Julmat Ali Khan
  - Nazmul Huda
  - Mahbub Ahmed
  - Abu Said Khan
  - Mohammad Ismail
  - Sirajul Huq Mantu
  - Shah Badrul Huq
  - Abdur Rauf
  - Morsheduzzaman
  - Jahir Uddin Khan
  - Sultan Ahmed Chowdhury
  - Toriqul Islam
  - Anwarul H Khan Chowdhury
  - Moin Uddin Khan
  - M. A. Sattar
  - Haji Jalal
  - Ahmed Ali Mandal
  - Shahed Ali
  - Abdul Wadud
  - Shah Abdul Halim
  - Muhammad Jamiruddin Sircar
  - Atauddin Khan
  - Abdur Razzaq Chowdhury
  - Ahmed Ali

During this time, it attracted a large pool of supporters and activists who joined the newly formed student wing and youth wing. After the formation of the government, the first executive committee of the party was declared. A national standing committee was formed as the highest decision-making forum of the party with 12 members.

Founding National Standing Committee
  - Ziaur Rahman
  - Abdus Sattar
  - Shah Azizur Rahman
  - Major General (Retd.) Majid-ul-Haq
  - Abdur Razzaq Chowdhury
  - Sheikh Razzak Ali
  - Barrister Muhammad Jamiruddin Sircar
  - Ekramul Huq
  - Dr. A. Q. M. Badruddoza Chowdhury
  - Syed Mahibul Hasan
  - Amina Rahman
  - A.S.M. Yusuf
  - Barrister Nazmul Huda

A youth wing was formed in September 1978, which was named Bangladesh Jatiotabadi Jubo Dal with Abul Kashem as its chief convener. The Dhaka unit convener was Saifur Rahman. Within a couple of months, the central executive committee of Jubo Dal was declared with Abul Kashem and Saifur Rahman as the President and general secretary respectively. Mirza Abbas became the Dhaka unit President with Kamruzzaman Ayat Ali as the Secretary-General.

=== Early years (1979–1982) ===
The BNP formed its first government after the 1979 Bangladesh general election. The first session of the parliament was on 2 April 1979. It elected Shah Azizur Rahman as prime minister and leader of the parliament. Mirza Ghulam Hafiz was elected as the speaker of the parliament. Asaduzzaman Khan from the Awami League became the leader of the opposition.

On 30 May 1981, the founder of the party, President Ziaur Rahman, was assassinated in the Chittagong Circuit House by a small group of military officials. After the assassination of Ziaur Rahman, large crowds started protesting in major cities, including Dhaka and Chittagong. The funeral of Ziaur Rahman became a huge event with the participation of millions of people in Dhaka.

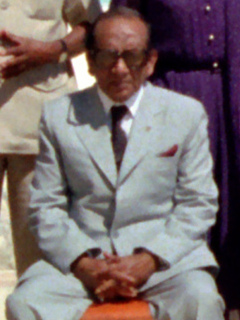
Abdus Sattar served as the country's eighth president and as the BNP's second chairperson.

In the 1981 Bangladeshi presidential election, Abdus Sattar was elected. He formed the National Security Council to involve the Bangladesh Armed Forces. Meanwhile, Vice President Mirza Nurul Huda resigned from his post in March 1982.

=== Struggle for democracy (1982–1990) ===
Army Chief Hussain Muhammad Ershad thwarted the elected government of Justice Sattar on 24 March 1982 and replaced him with Justice A. F. M. Ahsanuddin Chowdhury. The BNP was thrown out of power. Many of its leaders were imprisoned, including former Minister S.A. Bari, Saifur Rahman, Habibullah Khan, Tanvir Ahmed Siddiqui, Atauddin Khan, Jamal Uddin Ahmed, K.M. Obaidur Rahman, Abul Hasnat, and Moudud Ahmed. 233 BNP leaders were arrested from March to July 1982.

==== 7-Party Alliance ====
From 1983, Begum Khaleda Zia became the de facto decision-maker of the party. Under her leadership, the BNP formed a new anti-government alliance against the autocratic Ershad regime. It was named after the number of parties with it, the 7-party alliance.

The BNP launched a massive anti-government movement after coordinating with the Awami League-led 15-party alliance in September 1983. The 7-Party Alliance arranged a mass gathering and called a nationwide strike on 1 November 1983. The strike had successful results. After that, the alliance called to surround the Secretariat on 28 November 1983 along with the 15-Party Alliance. Thousands of BNP activists led by then Executive Secretary (later designated Office Secretary) M. Hamidullah Khan, surrounded the secretariat building at Paltan and made a large hole in the southern corner of the boundary wall of the building. The police retaliated with indiscriminate firing of live bullets. M. Hamidullah Khan was arrested on 3 November in the afternoon from his residence at Dhaka Cantonment. A ban on political activities was imposed that night, and Khaleda Zia was kept under house arrest. The government was severely shaken at its core. A long curfew and ban on politics were imposed.

On 29 February 1984, Ershad declared that the ban on politics would be lifted on 26 March and on 27 May, both the presidential and national elections would be held. The 7-Party Alliance asked for the national election before the presidential election. After lifting the ban, Khaleda Zia attended an extended meeting of the party on 1 April, where she was made the acting chairperson of the party. In May, the Chairperson Justice Sattar resigned, and Khaleda Zia was made the chairperson of the party.

Under the leadership of Khaleda Zia, the first major step BNP took was to expel leaders like Shah Azizur Rahman, Moudud Ahmed, AKM Maidul Islam, Abdul Alim, and Barrister Sultan Ahmed Chowdhury from the party. These leaders formed a committee with Shah Aziz as the President and AKM Maidul Islam as the general secretary. This faction later joined the Jatiya Front and Jatiya Party.

On 23 September 1984, while addressing a rally in Bogra, 10 to 12 handmade grenades were thrown at the rally, and some of them were aimed at the stage, where Khaleda Zia was giving her speech. Khaleda Zia narrowly escaped injury while eleven members of her party received severe injuries. A nationwide strike was called in protest at this attack on 22 and 27 December. The government imposed a ban on political activities on those days to foil the strike, but it was largely ignored. Two people, including a student leader from Bangladesh Jatiotabadi Chatra Dal, died when police fired on a crowd on 22 December.

The government, amid protests, held upazila elections on 15 May 1985 in 251 upazilas (subdistricts) and on 20 May in 209 subdistricts. The election was marked by rigging, stuffing, snatching of ballots and electoral fraud. Ershad's newly formed Janadal (People's Party) fielded 190 candidates, with 190 of them emerging victorious. Though BNP struggled because of government repression, it got 46 of its leaders as subdistrict chairmen, while the Awami League fared worse with 41 subdistrict chairmen.

In 1985, BNP's student wing Bangladesh Jatiotabadi Chatra Dal formed Shongrami Chatra Jote with Chatra League (Awranga), Chatra League (Pradhan) and five other student organisations and started its resistance against Ershad.

==== 1986 general election ====
In March 1986, Ershad declared that a national election would be held on 26 April. Both the 7-Party Alliance led by BNP and the 15-Party Alliance led by the Awami League declared a boycott of the election on 17 March. Both called a joint rally on 21 March and a nationwide strike on 22 March as the immediate program to thwart the forthcoming election.

The night before the nationwide strike on 22 March, the Awami League called a meeting of the 15-Party Alliance, but Sheikh Hasina refused to take part in the meeting. In the meeting, the majority of the parties, including the Awami League, were in favour of the election. General Khalilur Rahman of Awami League maintained close contact with the army headquarters during the meeting that night. Sheikh Hasina was discussing with General Khalil periodically.

On the final hours of 21 March 1986, Sheikh Hasina announced that the Awami League and her alliance would participate in the election. Five parties of the alliance parted ways from the Awami League after the announcement and decided to boycott the election. BNP and the 7-Party Alliance and the newly formed 5-Party alliance of leftists started campaigning against the election; meanwhile, Awami League and Jamaat-e-Islami Bangladesh joined the election.

The election was largely boycotted. BNP Chairperson Khaleda Zia mobilised a large pool of political parties and their leaders behind her to boycott the election. Apart from the BNP-led 7-Party Alliance and leftist 5-Party Alliance, 17 more parties including BNP (Shah Aziz), Samajbadi Dal (Nirmal Sen), Democratic League (Moshtaq), Democratic League (Oli Ahad), Islamic Democratic League, Islami Andolon (M. A. Jalil), Janata Party, Jatiya Ganatantrik Party, Labour Party (Maolana Matin), Muslim League (Kamruzzaman), Progatishil Ganatantrik Shakti and so on.

Zia reiterated that the BNP would participate only if:

1. The fundamental rights are restored
2. All political prisoners are released
3. All convictions of politicians by the military courts are cancelled

The anti-election alliance under the BNP called for a nationwide strike on election day. Unrest, voting fraud and malpractices marked the election day, according to the opposition parties. Both the Awami League and Bangladesh Jamaat-e-Islami conceded a humiliating defeat in the election.

General Hussain Muhammad Ershad got himself elected on 15 October 1986. Prior to the election, Khaleda Zia was put under house arrest on 13 October.

In a joint declaration, the two alliances called for the "Siege Dhaka" program on 10 November 1987. The government imposed a ban on public gatherings ahead of the program, which was defied on the day and during the program, the capital of the country virtually went under the control of the opposition alliances. This incident infuriated the opposition and a nationwide protest was called on the following day. The government came hard-handed, and both Khaleda Zia and Sheikh Hasina were put under house arrest on 11 October. Both parties and their partners in the movement declared frequent nationwide strikes for the next days until the end of the year.

==== 1988 general election ====
BNP was determined not to join the poll under the Ershad regime and decided to boycott the general election of 1988 after the abolishment of the previous parliament. The election was held on 3 March without the participation of any popular party or alliance; rather, a combined opposition was led by ASM Abdur Rab. BNP called a nationwide protest on election day and declared they would resist the election.

On the advice of Dr. Badruddoza Chowdhury, BNP chief Zia, on 21 June 1988, suspended the national standing committee and executive committee of the party for various reasons, including the failure to strengthen the party's leaders. During this opportunity, former military officers were also removed from leadership positions within the party. M. Hamidullah Khan was relieved from his post as Executive Secretary. On 3 July 1988, Barrister Abdus Salam Talukder, a distinguished lawyer, was assigned to the post of Secretary General of the party instead of KM Obaidur Rahman. Soon after the removal of Obaidur, he, with Jamal Uddin Ahmed and Abul Hasnat, formed a new party with the same name. On 17 July of the same year, Shah Azizur Rahman dissolved the BNP faction with him and joined the party with his followers on 26 August. Barrister Abdus Salam Talukder restructured the BNP, making it a stronger political platform that thrived through a critical time with a goal to topple Ershad's regime.

==== 1990 mass uprising ====
The movement against Ershad started gaining momentum in October 1990. The BNP-led 7-party alliance, the Awami League-led 8-party alliance and the Leftist 5-party alliance started a movement to usurp Ershad on 10 October 1990 and declared a nationwide strike on that day. The strike claimed 5 lives, including three BNP activists who were rallying in front of the central office of the Jatiya Party when Jatiya Party cadres opened fire on the crowd.

On 28 November, the opposition parties, including BNP and its student wing, defied the curfew and state of emergency and came out with large processions. The curfew and state of emergency were the last resort for Ershad, which became ineffective by the end of November 1990. On 3 December, the protests became more violent, and many died. Bombs were hurled at the Army Welfare Building, the Sena Kalyan Bhaban at Motijheel. From 27 November to 3 December, more than fifty protesters died. On 4 December, the mass uprising took place, and Ershad declared his resignation.

Dhaka University Central Students' Union (DUCSU), which has always been a centre of all popular movements in the history of Bangladesh, came under the control of Bangladesh Jatiotabadi Chatra Dal after the election of 3 June 1990. The Amanullah Aman-Khairul Kabir Khokan panel backed by Chatra Dal won all the posts and took the lead of the students' movement in the University of Dhaka.

The Chatra Dal-led DUCSU committee allied with all existing student groups on the campus, Sarbadaliya Chatra Oikya Parishad (All-party Students Alliance Council) and staged a demonstration on 1 October 1990. The protests turned violent after the police firing on a rally of Chatra Dal on 10 October that claimed the life of Naziruddin Jehad, a Chatra Dal leader from Sirajganj who came to Dhaka to join the rally against Ershad.

The series of student protests compelled the Ershad regime to think about a safe exit.

On 7 December 1989, the BNP-supported White panel of teachers got the highest number of Deans elected from their panel, including Professor Anwarullah Chowdhury, Professor S M Faiz, Assistant Professor M. Anwar Hossain and Associate Professor Humayun Ahmed.

The pro-BNP white panel of teachers, which dominated the Dhaka University Teachers Association, declared an all-out movement against the Ershad regime in 1990. All the teachers decided to resign from their posts on 29 November and confirmed their decision not to return to classes until the fall of Ershad. The firm reaction from the teachers jeopardised the Ershad regime.

After the fall of Ershad, because of the commitment to the national interest, the White panel of teachers won a decisive victory on 24 December 1990 in the election of the Dhaka University Teachers Association once again, with Professor Anwarullah Chowdhury as the President of the association, with Professor M. Anwar Hossain as the general secretary.

=== First Khaleda premiership (1991–1996) ===
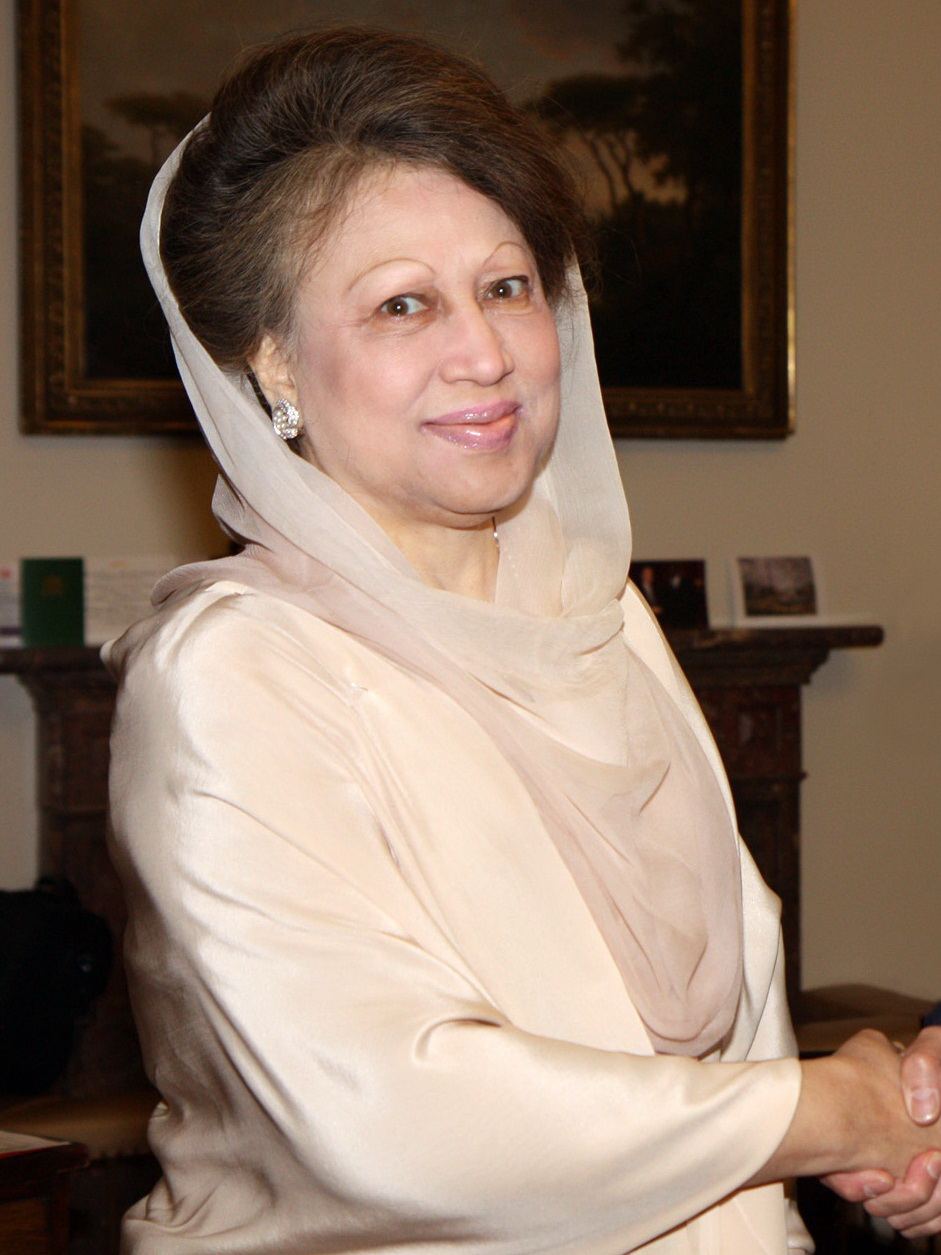
Khaleda Zia served as the country's prime minister and as the BNP's third chairperson.

The first Khaleda ministry was the country's government during the 5th legislative session of the Jatiya Sangsad following the 1991 Bangladeshi general election. It began on 20 March 1991 and but had to be sworn in again on 19 September after the 12th constitutional amendment took effect following a constitutional referendum. In accordance to the amendment, all executive powers were transferred from the president to the prime minister and thus Khaleda Zia became the first female head of government of Bangladesh. In addition, Abdur Rahman Biswas won the 1991 Bangladeshi presidential election.

The second Khaleda ministry was the country's government during the 6th legislative sessions of the Jatiya Sangsad following the February 1996 general election, boycotted by most of the opposition parties. The cabinet took oath in a hurry on 19 March 1996 amid hartals and protests from the opposition parties for a new election under a Caretaker Government.

The cabinet passed the Constitutional Amendment Bill in the sitting parliament to establish a neutral Caretaker Government system in Bangladesh. The second Khaleda ministry was short-lived; lasting only 12 days, the ministry transferred power to the caretaker government led by Muhammad Habibur Rahman on 30 March 1996, and an election was scheduled for June 1996.

=== In opposition (1996–2001) ===
Snap general elections were held in Bangladesh on 12 June 1996. They were called following the controversial February 1996 elections, which were boycotted by the opposition and saw a turnout of just 21%.

The result of the snap elections was a victory for the Bangladesh Awami League, which won 146 of the 300 directly elected seats, resulting in its leader Sheikh Hasina becoming Prime Minister. It was the first election victory for the Awami League since 1973 and the party's removal from power in a 1975 coup. Voter turnout was 76%, the highest in Bangladesh's electoral history until 2008.

=== Second Khaleda premiership (2001–2006) ===
The third Khaleda ministry was the ministry that served during the 8th legislative session of the Jatiya Sangsad following the 2001 general election. The cabinet took office on 10 October 2001 and left office on 29 October 2006. The BNP led by Zia returned to power, defeating Hasina's Awami League. In addition, A. Q. M. Badruddoza Chowdhury won the 2001 Bangladeshi presidential election.

==== 2006–2008 political crisis ====
The military-backed government promised to tackle the longstanding problems of corruption, filing charges against more than 160 politicians, civil servants and businessmen in 2007. Among those charged were Khaleda Zia and her two sons, as well as Sheikh Hasina, leader of the Awami League.

The Bangladesh Election Commission invited Hafizuddin's faction, rather than Khaleda Zia's, to participate in talks, effectively recognising the former as the legitimate BNP. Zia challenged this in court, but her appeal was rejected on 10 April 2008. After her release later that year, Zia was restored to her position as party leader.

==== 2008 general election ====
In the general election, the 4-party alliance led by the BNP won 33 seats out of 299 constituencies, with the BNP alone securing just 30. Sheikh Hasina then succeeded Zia as prime minister, ending the BNP's tenure in government.

=== In opposition (2009–2026) ===
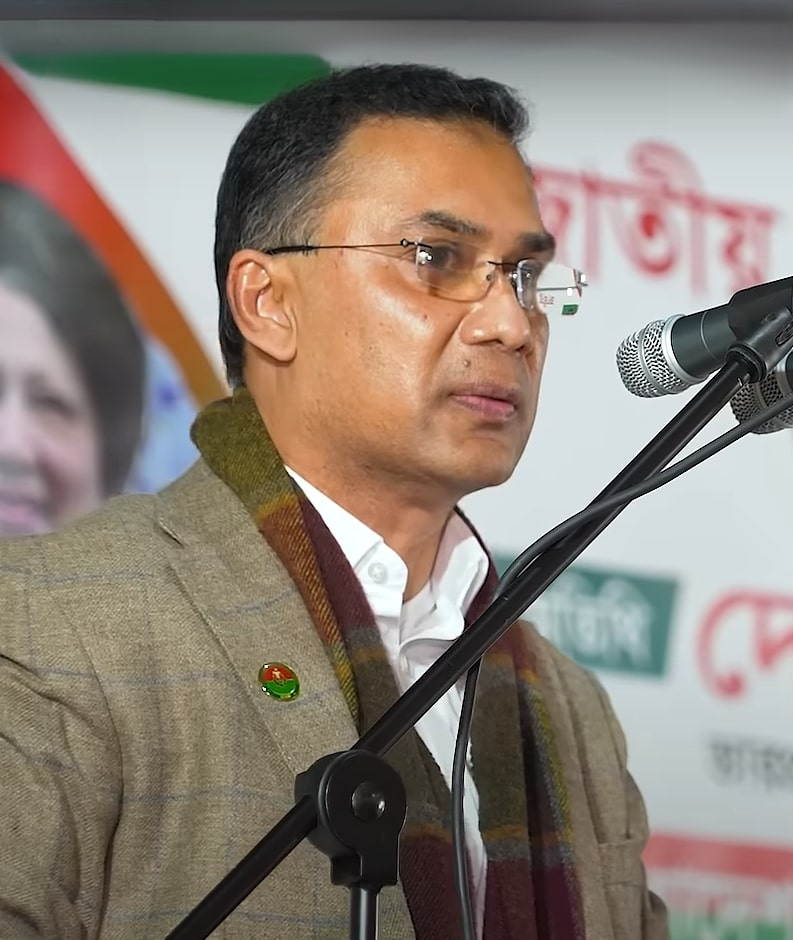
The party's fourth and current chairman, Tarique Rahman

After sanctions by the Election Commission, the party held country-wide events for local leaders to play an active role in the national party. The BNP National Council empowered re-elected party chairperson Khaleda Zia to pick other members for the National Executive Committee and Standing Committee. It elected her eldest son, Tarique Rahman, to the powerful post as Senior vice-chairman, in a "move apparently designed to smooth his path to the party helm."

After several movements in a period of severe political unrest between 2012 and 2014 to prevent the ruling party from holding the 10th general election in January 2014 without a neutral caretaker government, Khaleda led BNP and its allies in a boycott of the election. Incidents of violence were reported on polling day, including the bombing of election centres, which the BNP and its allies were accused of. Over 100 people were killed in violent clashes surrounding the 2016 union council elections between Awami League and BNP supporters. In 2016, the BNP announced its new National Standing Committee, in which Khaleda retained her position as chairperson. New members were recruited while some older members were removed, and various new strategies for party operation were formulated. In May 2017, Khaleda revealed BNP's Vision 2030 to gain public support for the next general elections. However the ruling Awami League government denounced Vision 2030 as an act of plagiarism of Awami League's Vision 2021 which they used in the ninth general election and claimed most of the targets in the Visions were fulfilled by Awami League, thus declaring BNP's Vision 2030 as unoriginal. BNP also announced it will hold processions to hold the next general elections under a neutral government. This renewed tensions between the BNP and the Awami League.

==== 2018 general election ====
On 8 February 2018, Khaleda Zia and her son Tarique Rahman, as per the court verdict, were jailed for 5 and 10 years respectively due to involvement in the Zia Charitable Trust corruption case. While Tarique was in exile, Khaleda was imprisoned in the old Dhaka Central Jail on Nazimuddin Road. In protest, the BNP held nationwide demonstrations, which were foiled by a well-prepared police force across the nation. A large number of BNP activists were arrested during clashes with the police during the protests against Khaleda's imprisonment. Due to the verdict, Zia was declared ineligible to run for any constituency.

On 9 October 2018, the government of Bangladesh formed a nine-member group to detect and monitor rumours on social media sites such as Facebook. Tarana Halim said the group's goal was to ensure that "people [have] the right information only." Two months later, approximately 30 accounts linked to the spreading of fictitious news reports regarding the BNP were blocked from Facebook and Twitter.

After the jailing of chairperson Begum Khaleda Zia, BNP expedited the process of forging a national unity with prominent leaders of the country. In October 2018, the party formally announced its joining of Jatiya Oikya Front with Dr. Kamal Hossain at its forefront.

There was controversy in the run-up to the 2018 elections surrounding the nomination of banned Jamaat candidates under the BNP banner. In 2013, Jamaat-e-Islami was banned from registering and therefore contesting in elections by the High Court, citing their charter in violation of the constitution. However, 25 Jamaat candidates ran in the election, with 22 nominations for BNP and 3 running as independents. An investigation was launched but on 23 December, the Election Commission Secretary Helaluddin Ahmed said they had examined the related law and "there is no scope for rejecting the Jamaat leaders' candidacy at this moment." On 26 December, just days before the election, Jatiya Oikya Front leader Kamal Hossain expressed his regret about Jamaat's involvement in the elections under his alliance, claiming "had I known [that Jamaat leaders will be given BNP tickets] I would not have been part of it." The media, however, had reported at the end of November that this was happening.

Not being able to contest herself, Zia's BNP won 7 seats and nearly 12 percent of the vote at the 2018 general election.

==== 2024 and 2026 general elections ====
On 26 March 2020, Zia's prison sentence was suspended for six months amid the COVID-19 pandemic, and she was granted a conditional release because she received medical treatment within the country and did not travel abroad. The six-month suspension has been granted for a total of six consecutive times, with the most recent one being on 18 September 2022. Since Zia's release, the BNP campaigned for her unconditional release and for the ruling government to allow her to travel abroad.

In preparation for the 2024 general election, the BNP launched a series of rallies which advocated for the resignation of Prime Minister Sheikh Hasina and the return of the caretaker government. During a rally held in Dhaka on 10 December 2022, seven BNP lawmakers announced their resignation from the current government in demands of the dissolution of parliament, the formation of a new election commission, and allowing the election to be held under a neutral caretaker government. The party ended up boycotting the election, as they assumed that the election commission under the incumbent government were unable to organise a free and fair election.

The BNP actively supported the 2024 Bangladesh quota reform movement. Later, it joined the Non-cooperation movement against the government.

After the July Uprising, BNP chairperson Khaleda Zia was set free. Following her release, she offered a speech to the nation after six years of imprisonment. After interim government was formed, the party demanded for democratic elections. Her son, Tarique Rahman, returned to Bangladesh on 25 December 2025, five days before she died following a prolonged illness. On 9 January 2026, Rahman succeeded his mother as chairperson of the BNP. The BNP won a landslide victory in the 2026 general election, with Rahman being elected to the Jatiya Sangsad for his first term and has been sworn as the prime minister since 17 February 2026.

== Ideology ==
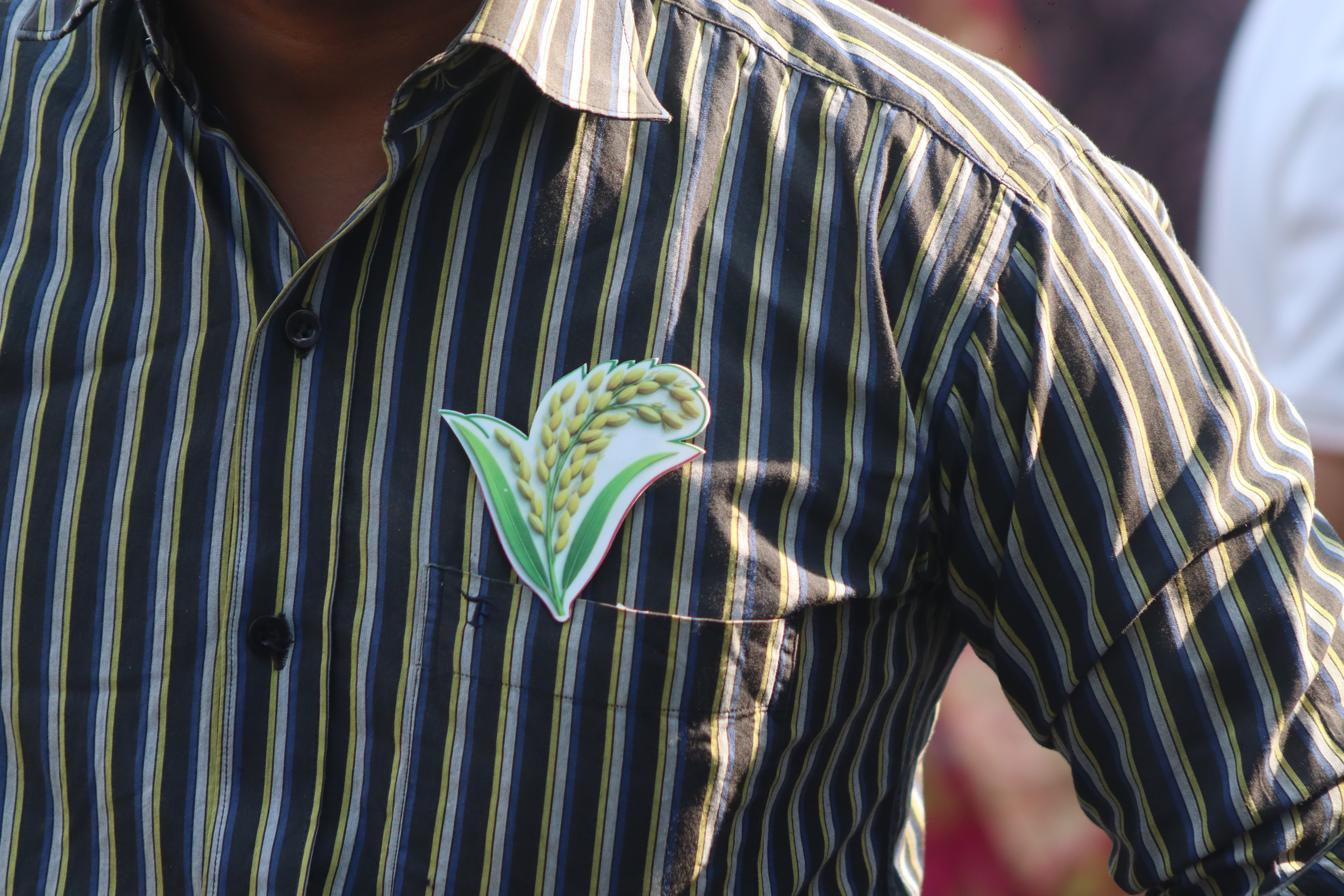
A polling agent of BNP with a shief of paddy coat pin in 2026 general election

Bangladesh Nationalist Party is a big tent party that has been cited as being on the centre and centre-right of the political spectrum with ideological base combining conservatism, economic liberalism, neoliberalism, and liberalism. The party's official website states its founding principles to be: "full faith and trust in Allah", Bangladeshi nationalism, democracy and socialism "in the sense of economic and social justice". The party traditionally maintained a nationalistic and Islam-aligned image, allied with Islamist parties, such as Jamaat-e-Islami. However, since the 2018 general election and specially after the July Uprising, the left-leaning faction of the party become increasely dominant and attempted to rebrand the party's position as centre-left. The party sought to take a "liberal mantle" to appese the secular voter base.

BNP was originally formed during the political vacuum after the 1975 coups, for which, politicians from diverse political background joined the newly formed BNP in order to return to mainstream politics, after the withdrawal of martial law. Many of them had conflicting ideologies, including politicians from various Islamist parties to "pro-China left and NAP". Bangladeshi Canadian analyst Mir Aftabuddin Ahmed called the early BNP "a coalition of convenience rather than ideology". Many political experts, including Ahmed, believe that since BNP was born after the fall of Awami League, the party was an attempt to establish a position in areas where Awami League was moderate.

According to Bangladeshi American political analyst Ali Riaz, the BNP's political philosophy is largely influenced by a combination of nationalism, cultural conservatism and a "pro-Islamic identity in opposition to the Awami League's secular Bengali nationalism".

On the other hand, according to the pro-BNP political analyst Maruf Mallick, the party was founded as centre-left, liberal and social democratic, and its early political and economic policy was inspired by the Western European social liberal politics.

=== Nationalism ===
Bangladeshi nationalism is the central ideology of the party. According to its founder Ziaur Rahman, the "Bangladeshi" identity, based on its history, traditions, culture and geographical territory, is different from the neighbouring nations and unique to itself. Mallick argued that Rahman wanted to move away from what he called "narrow minded" ethnic and religious nationalism and wanted to create the identity of the citizens on the basis of the state, basically on the model of Western or Northern European countries.

=== Economy ===
The party self-describes as fically socialist and claims to have practiced what it terms the "people's democracy". Despite this, the party from its beginning has promoted economic liberalism and free-market economy with limited intervention. Rahman believed that the previous socialist-influenced economy of Bangladesh had been in a poor shape because of "years of colonial-style exploitation". To abate this condition, a revamp of the economic system was required, which was primarily, according to Mubashar Hasan, an "outline for a capitalist system". According to Mallick, the early BNP was inspired by the European social liberal policies, supporting equal distribution of wealth and social welfare, as opposed to strong economic regulatory policies of its predecessor Awami League.

=== Religion ===
Although the party officially doesn't align with any particular religion, its official website states that the party aims to "preserve the age old human values of the Bangladeshi people through the teaching of Islam–religion of the majority of Bangladeshi people and other religions". The party also promotes religious freedom and tolerance as a component of Bangladeshi nationalism. Rahman also rejected theocracy as the governing system for Bangladesh.

In recent times, various analysts have indicated a shift in the BNP towads secularism, departing from its moderate Islamic position. Since the July Uprising, the party attempted to "appropriate the moral vocabulary of secular nationalism" in order to occupy the vacuum left by the Awami League. Despite this, BNP publicly denies being secular or pluralist and opposed the inclusion of these principles in the national constitution.

According to Mallick, BNP is not a religion-based party in a traditional sense and it has a moderate stance on religion. BNP's stance for conservatism has been described as "a mixture of traditional Bengali customs and moderate Islam". Mir Aftabuddin Ahmed opined:

Often perceived as a conservative entity due to its previous alliances with Islamist groups, much of the BNP's policy agenda during its nearly 15 years in government was not inherently Islamist. In fact, with a few exceptions, it leaned more toward right- or left-of-centre ideals. However, from 2001 to 2006, the party became too closely associated with Jamaat, making it easy to conflate the BNP's ideology with Jamaat's.

=== Voter base ===
Being a big tent party, the BNP generally tries to appeal and secure support from different communities, classes and occupations. However, for historical and ideological reasons, some "core group" of supporters always support the party. According to the political scientist Rounaq Jahan, the BNP was "founded with greater support from the urban and higher income groups, particularly civil and military bureaucracy and business community."

Following the July Uprising, surveys show that the BNP's strongest demographic base are working-age voters, farmers and labourers, who are likely to be supportive for the past governance record of the party. According to Netra News, the party also received support from some Deobandi clerics, Sufis, Ahmadis, social liberals, secular and some left-leaning voters, Hindus and indigenous peoples of the Chittagong Hill Tracts in the 2026 general election. Significant number of Hindus preferred voting for BNP as the latter option Jamaat-e-Islami is known for anti-Hindu persecution including during the 1971 Liberation War.

A June 2025 survey conducted by the South Asian Network on Economic Modeling (SANEM) on the Bangladeshis aged between 15 and 35 found that the BNP's projected vote share was higher than any other parties in the country; and comparatively high among the young males and the urban younths of the country, comparing with the young females and the rural youths, respectively. The survey found that 38.78% youths intended to vote the BNP in 2026 general election; while 40% males and 37.03% females, and 37.72% rural and 39.77% urban youths intended to vote the party.

== Policies ==
=== Domestic policy ===
In 1978, President Rahman amended the national constitution which gave the president more effective control over the cabinet and parliament. After the 1979 general election, Rahman formed a cabinet dominated by the civil–military bureaucrats. Apart from the cabinet, they also dominated the secretariat, the National Economic Council (NEC), the planning commission and the public corporations. During this period, BNP emerged as a multi-dimensional "umbrella" party.

Upon taking power, Rahman introduced a state-sponsored Islamization process that had a significant impact on Bangladeshi society and culture. His government replaced secularism with the phrase "absolute faith and trust in Almighty Allah" as a fundamental principle through the fifth amendment to the national constitution. His government also adopted a conservative family planning programme to control population growth in the country. In 2004, the BNP-led coalition government banned all Ahmadiyya publication in Bangladesh in pressure of the Islamist groups, citing that those "hurt the majority Muslims" in the country.

During the government, the BNP focused on the development of socially backward and marginalized people, such as the women, the Bedes, the Dalits, the Harijans and the Hijras etc. During Khaleda Zia's first term, her government carried out reform in the education sector and national curricula and to encourage female and universal education. Primary education was made free and compulsory and budget allocated to this sector was increased.

The BNP is also notable for being the only major party — compared to the Awami League and Jamaat-e-Islami — whose constitution explicitly references women as a labor force. The 2008 BNP constitution commits "to make appropriate and proper use of human resources including labour power of women."

=== Economic policy ===
After Ziaur Rahman's ascension to the power, the national development strategy was shifted from the extensive protectionism of the Sheikh Mujib era to the encouragement of private enterprise with a primary goal of maximization of GNP growth rate. Rahman's government revised the First Five-Year Plan (1973–1978) taken by the Sheikh Mujib's government and formulated a "Three year hard core plan" for remaining three years. This was followed by the Two-Year Plan (1978–1980) and the Second Five Year Plan (1980–1985) under the successive BNP governments. Besides, his government gave special importance to the development of agriculture and planned an integrated collective farming system.

In parallel, the BNP promoted women's economic empowerment by facilitating access to low-interest loans, supporting entrepreneurship training, and implementing measures to remove social and cultural barriers. During Tarique Rahman's premiership, the Family Card initiative was launched. Under the initiative, aimed to improve the women's economic conditions, low-income and marginalized families have received and amount of money or utensils using a card issued to the eldest female member of the family.

=== Foreign policy ===
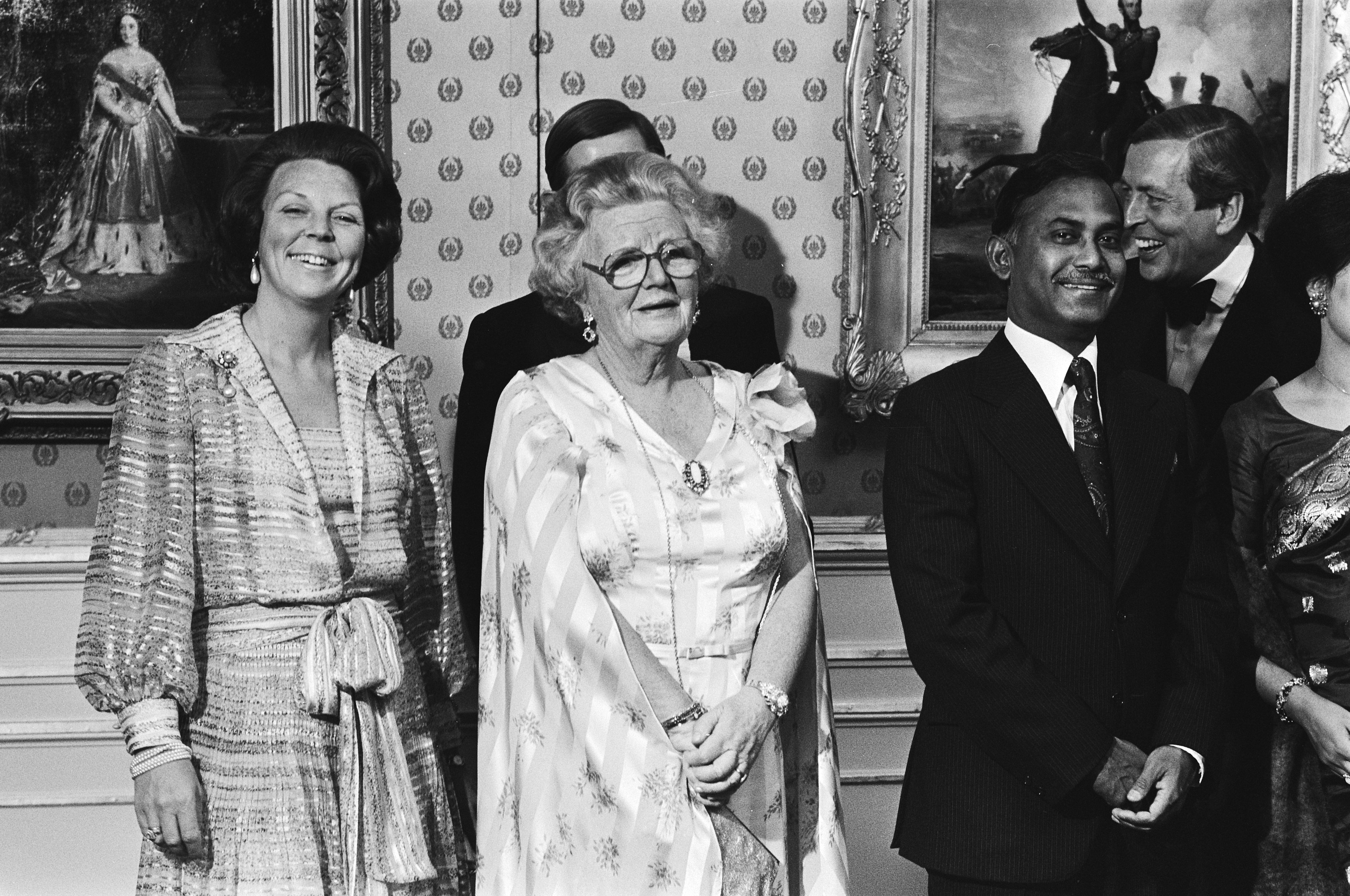
Ziaur Rahman with Queen Juliana and Princess Beatrix of the Netherlands, 1979

As stated in the party's official website, the main objective of the BNP's foreign policy is to maintain good relationships with the Western world, the Muslim World and the Third World countries.

Traditionally, BNP was described as being sceptical to India multiple times. The party has a history of hostile relations with India during government and has used anti-India sentiment during opposition. After Ziaur Rahman became the president, his government started to distance Bangladesh from India and foreign policy was initiated against the Indo-Soviet axis. Some sources say that the Indo-Bangladesh relations were at their worst in memory during Rahman's presidency. Prime Minister Khaleda Zia herself said, "We do not want to see the rise of any major power [India] in this region, because it will disturb the peace, stability and balance in this region". Even in early-2024, some of the top BNP leaders, including Ruhul Kabir Rizvi, joined the "India Out" campaign against Sheikh Hasina government.

However, in August 2024, following the July Uprising, BNP secretary-general Mirza Fakhrul Islam Alamgir expressed a desire to "move past previous differences and collaborate", assuring India that the BNP would not permit activities that would threaten India's security, but stated that relations would decline if India did not extradite Hasina. Many BNP leaders opined that good relationship with India was necessary for keeping stability in the internal politics of Bangladesh. After BNP formed government in 2026, Bangladesh went to normalize its strained relations with India during the Yunus government.

Ziaur Rahman's government focused on the strengthening of its relationship with the Muslim world and the Arab world. His government amended the national constitution adding articles 25(1) and 25(2) declaring the establishment of brotherhood with the Muslim countries. Following his predecessor Mostaq, his government continued the close relationship with Pakistan. His government abandoned the constitutional policies of secularism and socialism in favour of building good ties with the Muslim countries. Besides, Rahman facilitated the investment of Western capital in the country by taking liberal economic measures. His government improved relations with the United States and China.

BNP government's foreign policy during the third premiership of Khaleda Zia between 2001 and 2006 was called "Look East Foreign Policy". In 2002, Prime Minister Zia visited Thailand, Myanmar and China and met with the leaders of those countries to expand Bangladesh's foreign policy to the east.

== National Standing Committee ==
The National Standing Committee is the highest policy-making standing committee of the BNP. As of 15 August 2026, standing committee members are as follows:

Name	Picture
Tarique Rahman	
Khandaker Mosharraf Hossain	
Rafiqul Islam Miah	
Mirza Abbas	
Gayeshwar Chandra Roy	
Abdul Moyeen Khan	
Nazrul Islam Khan	
Amir Khasru Mahmud Chowdhury	
Salahuddin Ahmed	
Selima Rahman	
Iqbal Hassan Mahmood	
AZM Zahid Hossain	
Ruhul Kabir Rizvi	
Amanullah Aman	
Farhad Halim Donar	
Md. Ismail Zabihullah	

== Controversies ==
=== Allegations of corruption and patronage ===
During the periods the Bangladesh Nationalist Party (BNP) was in power, specifically from 1991 to 1996 and from 2001 to 2006 under the leadership of Khaleda Zia, allegations of various types of corruption surfaced, including the embezzlement of funds through charitable trusts and government contracts, many of which were subsequently proven. In the Zia Charitable Trust case filed by the Anti-Corruption Commission in August 2011, Khaleda Zia and her associates were accused of diverting approximately 2.14 crore BDT (about US$250,000 at that time) from a trust fund designated for orphans and the poor towards personal assets, such as purchasing land for party activities; she was convicted in 2018 and sentenced to five years in prison, but the High Court acquitted her in 2024. Similarly, in a case filed in 2008 regarding the embezzlement of 3.15 crore BDT from the Zia Orphanage Trust for unauthorized expenses, Khaleda Zia was sentenced to 10 years in prison in 2016, which the Supreme Court overturned in January 2025. As a result, she was exonerated from the remaining corruption charges, paving the way for her potential participation in elections. BNP leaders have consistently described these legal proceedings as politically motivated trials orchestrated by the rival Awami League government. Additional allegations were brought forward targeting infrastructure and procurement contracts during the 2001–2006 tenure. For instance, the GATCO case was filed in September 2007 against Khaleda Zia and 14 others for causing a loss of 1.45 billion (145 crore) BDT to the state by rigging tenders for gas infrastructure contracts to favour allies; although these investigations were initiated during the military-backed caretaker government in 2007, they yielded mixed judicial results in the face of claims regarding the weakness of evidence. Bangladesh's low ranking during the BNP regime was reflected in Transparency International's Corruption Perceptions Index. In 2001, the score was 15 out of 100, which improved slightly to stand at 26 by 2006. While this attributed structural corruption to elite capture by all parties, specific BNP-related scandals further entrenched the perception of nepotism in the allocation of state resources. It is alleged that during the BNP regime, patronage networks consolidated party loyalty through the appointment of family members and associates to key government positions.

=== Connection to militancy and violence ===
The Bangladesh Nationalist Party (BNP) has faced allegations of indirect links to Islamist militancy. These allegations primarily stem from the party's electoral alliance with Jamaat-e-Islami (JI), an Islamist party with historical ties to extremist elements. Formed in 1999, this alliance culminated in the Four-Party Alliance's victory in the 2001 parliamentary elections. During the tenure of the BNP-Jamaat government from October 2001 to November 2006, Islamist militant activity in Bangladesh increased significantly. This included coordinated attacks by groups such as Jamaat-ul-Mujahideen Bangladesh (JMB) and its affiliate, Jagrata Muslim Janata Bangladesh (JMJB). These groups claimed responsibility for over 450 low-intensity bomb blasts across 63 districts of the country on 17 August 2005, with the aim of establishing Sharia rule. Critics, including security analysts in their reports, have blamed the expansion of this militancy on indirect patronage or lax law enforcement by the BNP-led authorities. Despite international pressure, they were initially hesitant to dismantle the militant networks. As a result, individuals such as JMJB leader Siddiqul Islam (known as Bangla Bhai) were able to operate with alleged local protection in BNP strongholds in northwestern Bangladesh until their arrest in March 2006. These allegations suggest that the BNP was tolerant of banned groups involved in previous violence, such as the 2007 bombings. Assessments by the South Asia Terrorism Portal have noted that Bangladesh provided sanctuary to Islamist extremists during the BNP's tenure. Although the BNP government eventually authorized the arrest and execution of JMB leaders following the 2005 attacks and subsequent bombings that killed judges and officials, international observers and succeeding Awami League governments argued that this delay helped consolidate the militants' base. They argued that this delay was likely fuelled by political calculations to counter secular opponents. Immigration reviews by the US Department of Justice have highlighted the BNP's promotion of Islamism through its alliance with Jamaat. Beyond militancy, the BNP is also implicated in broader political violence. This violence often occurs through their grassroots affiliate organizations, such as the Jatiyatabadi Chhatra Dal (student wing) and Jubo Dal (youth wing). According to Human Rights Watch documentation, these organizations have been involved in armed intimidation, clashes, and enforcing strikes since the 1990s. Examples include violent blockades and arson during the BNP-led opposition movement in 2013–2015, and pre-election skirmishes in 2024. Hundreds of people have been injured and killed in clashes between party activists in these incidents.

== Election results ==
=== Presidential elections ===
Election	Party candidate	Votes	%	Result
1981	Abdus Sattar	14,203,958	65.5%	Elected ✓
1991	Abdur Rahman Biswas	172	65.15%	Elected ✓
2001	A. Q. M. Badruddoza Chowdhury	Unopposed	100%	Elected ✓
2026	Mirza Fakhrul Islam Alamgir	255	74.34%	Elected ✓

=== Jatiya Sangsad elections ===
Election	Party leader	Votes	%	Seats	+/–	Position	Result
1979	Ziaur Rahman	7,934,236	41.17	207 / 300	New	1st	Supermajority
1986	Khaleda Zia	Boycotted		0 / 300	▼207	—N/a	Extra-parliamentary
1988	Khaleda Zia	Boycotted		0 / 300	0	—N/a	Extra-parliamentary
1991	Khaleda Zia	10,507,549	30.81	140 / 300	▲140	▲1st	Coalition
Feb 1996	Khaleda Zia	11,776,481	100	278 / 300	▲138	1st	Supermajority
Jun 1996	Khaleda Zia	14,255,986	33.61	116 / 300	▼162	▼2nd	Opposition
2001	Khaleda Zia	22,833,978	40.97	193 / 300	▲77	▲1st	Majority
2008	Khaleda Zia	22,757,101	32.50	30 / 300	▼163	▼2nd	Opposition
2014	Khaleda Zia	Boycotted		0 / 300	▼30	—N/a	Extra-parliamentary
2018	Khaleda Zia	11,113,253	13.06	7 / 300	▲7	▲3rd	Opposition
2024	Khaleda Zia	Boycotted		0 / 300	▼7	—N/a	Extra-parliamentary
2026	Tarique Rahman	37,933,873	49.97	209 / 299	▲209	▲1st	Supermajority

== See also ==
- Politics of Bangladesh
- List of political parties in Bangladesh
  - Awami League
  - Bangladesh Jamaat-e-Islami
  - National Citizen Party
- 5th National Council of the Bangladesh Nationalist Party
- General Secretary of Bangladesh Nationalist Party
- Other wings:
  - Bangladesh Jatiotabadi Ainjibi Forum
  - Agriculturists Association of Bangladesh
  - Bangladesh Sammilito Peshajibi Parishad

== Citations ==
Notes

== Bibliography ==
- Ahmed, Mahiuddin (2016), BNP: Somoy-Osomoy বিএনপি সময়-অসময় (in Bengali), Prothoma, ISBN 978-984-91762-51
- Hasan, Mubashar (2020). Islam and Politics in Bangladesh: The Followers of Ummah. Singapore: Springer Nature. ISBN 978-981-15-1116-5.
- Huq, Abdul F. (1984). "The problem of National Identity in Bangladesh". Journal of Social Studies. 24: 47–73.
- Islam, AKM Maidul (2015), Atmosottar Rajniti Ebong Amar Bhabna আত্মসত্তার রাজনীতি এবং আমার ভাবনা (in Bengali), Hatekhari
- Khan, Manjur Rashid (2015), Amar Sainik Jibon: Pakistan theke Bangladesh আমার সৈনিক জীবনঃ পাকিস্তান থেকে বাংলাদেশ (in Bengali), Prothoma, ISBN 978-984-33-3879-2
- Rahman, Mohammad Habibur (2013), বাংলাদেশের রাজনৈতিক ঘটনাপঞ্জি ১৯৭১-২০১১ [Bangladesh Political Events (1971–2011)] (in Bengali), Prothoma, ISBN 978-984-90255-6-6
- van Schendel, Willem; Guhathakurta, Meghna (2013). The Bangladesh Reader: History, Culture, Politics. Duke University Press. p. 550. ISBN 978-0-8223-5318-8.
- Siddiqui, Kamal; Ahmed, Jamshed; Siddique, Kaniz; Huq, Sayeedul; Hossain, Abul; Nazimud-Doula, Shah; Rezawana, Nahid (2010). Social formation in Dhaka, 1985–2005: a longitudinal study of society in a third world megacity. Ashgate. ISBN 978-1-4094-1103-1.
