= Bangladesh Jatiotabadi Swechhasebak Dal =

Volunteer wing of Bangladesh Nationalist Party

- বাংলাদেশ জাতীয়তাবাদী স্বেচ্ছাসেবক দল

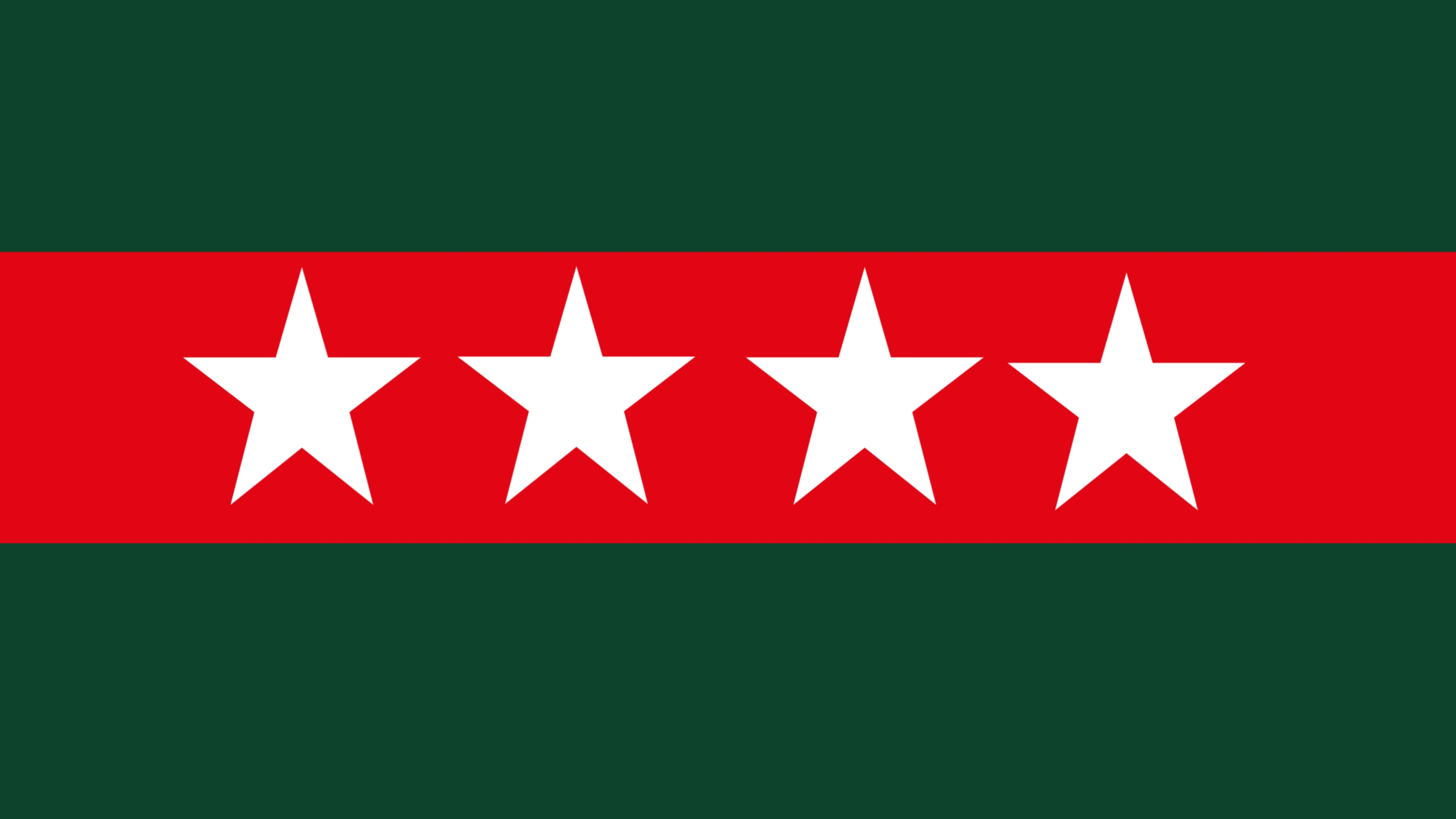
- Flag of Bangladesh Jatiotabadi Swechhasebak Dal
- Formation: August 19, 1980; 45 years ago
- Founder: Ziaur Rahman
- Headquarters: 28/1, Naya Paltan, VIP Road, Dhaka
- Region served: Bangladesh
- Official language: Bengali
- President: S. M Zilani
- General Secretary: Razib Ahsan
- Parent organization: Bangladesh Nationalist Party
- Website: Affiliated Party Website

Bangladesh Swechhasebak Dal (Bengali: বাংলাদেশ জাতীয়তাবাদী স্বেচ্ছাসেবক দল, lit. 'Bangladesh Nationalist Volunteers Party') is the volunteer wing of the Bangladesh Nationalist Party (BNP).

== History ==
The founder of BNP, President Ziaur Rahman, established Bangladesh Nationalist Volunteers Party on 19 August 1980 to create a group of volunteers to work during natural disasters.

== Leadership ==
After its establishment, a 23-member committee was convened by journalist Kazi Siraj. Then on August 19, 1985, a committee of 29 members was formed under the leadership of Kazi Asaduzzaman. Presently, President SM Jilani and Rajib Ahsan are serving as General Secretary. Sechchasevak Dal head office is located at Naya Paltan, Dhaka.

== Attack on Sechchhasebak Dal President ==
The local leaders and activists of Bangladesh Nationalist Party and its allied organizations organized a roadside gathering in Ghonapara, Gopalganj to mark the arrival of central president of Sechchasebak Dal, S. M. Jilani, at his hometown in Tungipara, Gopalganj. After the rally at Bedgram in the town, BNP leaders and activists set off towards Ghonapara of Gopalganj district. When their convoy reached Ghonapara, local leaders and activists of the Awami League launched a sudden attack on them. In the attack, first-class umpire of Bangladesh Cricket Board and sports secretary of central committee of the Sechchasebak Dal, Shawkat Ali Didar, along with Gopalganj metropolitan Sechchasebak Dal leader Liton, were killed. The attack also left at least 50 people injured, including Sechchhasebak Dal president SM Jilani, his wife, Gopalganj District Mahila Dal president Rowshan Ara Ratna, and Somoy TV cameraman HM Manik.

BNP Secretary General Mirza Fakhrul Islam Alamgir expressed deep concern over the incident in a statement. Bangladesh Jamaat-e-Islami condemned and protested the attack on the convoy of the Sechchhasebak Dal's president and the resulting loss of life. The party described the attack as brutal and cowardly. The Anti-discrimination Students Movement demanded the immediate arrest and prosecution of those involved in the attack. Additionally, they called for a ban on the Awami League and all its affiliated organizations for their involvement in terrorist activities.

== Controversies ==
On 9 July 2025, a scrap trader named Lal Chand Sohag was killed on the premises of Mitford Hospital in Dhaka, Bangladesh. A video of the incident, which circulated widely on social media, showed Sohag being hacked, stoned, and his dead body being stomped on. The attackers were reportedly affiliated with the Jatiotabadi Jubodal, Swechhasebak Dal, and Chatra Dal—the youth and student wings of the Bangladesh Nationalist Party (BNP). The incident occurred in broad daylight and drew widespread public condemnation. In response, law enforcement authorities arrested four suspects in connection with the case. The BNP subsequently expelled five members allegedly involved in the incident, following nationwide criticism and protests.
