= Mohammad Abdul Mobarak =

Bangladeshi election commissioner

Mohammad Abdul Mobarak (c. 1946 – 21 July 2025) was a Bangladeshi civil servant and former Election Commissioner of Bangladesh from 2012 to 2017. Mobarak served on the Bangladesh Election Commission from 2012 to 2017. He oversaw the cancellation of the Bangladesh Jamaat-e-Islami's registration.

== Early life ==
Mobarak was born in Hathazari Upazila, Chittagong District. He was a member of the Officers Club, Dhaka.

== Career ==
Mobarak retired as a joint secretary from the Bangladesh Civil Service. He was appointed a member of the Bangladesh Law Commission in 2009. He was awarded the Dhaka Deputy Commissioner's Victory Day Award in 2009 for public administration. He was appointed as an election commissioner on 9 February 2012 by President Zillur Rahman, alongside other members of the Election Commission led by Chief Election Commissioner Kazi Rakibuddin Ahmad. Other commissioners appointed along with him were Mohammad Abu Hafiz, Brigadier General Md Jabed Ali, and Judge Md Shahnewaz. The Bangladesh Nationalist Party called the appointments unconstitutional and illegal.

In 2014, while serving as acting Chief Election Commissioner, Mobarak received a death threat over the phone from an unidentified caller while at his office in Dhaka. A general diary was filed with local police following the incident, and security measures around the Election Commission Secretariat were subsequently increased. The threat came amid political tensions over his remarks on the Bangladesh Nationalist Party's participation in the Upazila elections. The then Chief Election Commissioner, Kazi Rakibuddin Ahmad, was staying in the United States after the 10th Parliamentary Elections. During his tenure, he was part of the commission that conducted the 10th parliamentary election. He drew criticism from journalists following an incident in which he was accused of behaving rudely with reporters after an electoral meeting. The Chief Election Commissioner, Kazi Rakibuddin Ahmad, later expressed regret over and apologized for the incident. The commission rejected the military for election duty during the local elections in 2015.

In 2016, Mobarak was among the members of the Election Commission during an internal dispute over the order of signing official documents, as Commissioner Md. Shah Newaz proposed a rotational system for the first signatory status. The issue reflected broader disagreements within the commission regarding administrative procedures and hierarchy among commissioners. Mobarak was part of the five-member Election Commission that oversaw thousands of elections, including the 2014 parliamentary election and various local government polls. The commission faced significant criticism from opposition parties and observers over its handling of elections, particularly the 2014 general election, which was boycotted by the Bangladesh Nationalist Party and resulted in many uncontested seats, as well as for violence surrounding local government polls.

Mobarak was elected president of the Chattogram Samiti-Dhaka in 2020, while Md Abdul Mabud, former director general of the Immigration and Passport Department, was elected general secretary.

After the fall of the Sheikh Hasina-led Awami League government, a sedition case was filed against Mobarak along with other former Election Commissioners in September 2024.

== Death ==
Mobarak died on 21 July 2025 at the Apollo Imperial Hospitals in Chittagong at the age of 79; he had cancer.
