= Bangladesh Election Commission =

Independent constitutional body

- বাংলাদেশ নির্বাচন কমিশন
- Logo of Bangladesh Election Commission

- Flag of Bangladesh Election Commission

Agency overview
- Formed: 7 July 1972; 54 years ago
- Type: Regulating and conducting elections in all-over Bangladesh
- Jurisdiction: Bangladesh
- Headquarters: Nirbachon Bhaban, Agargaon, Dhaka
- Annual budget: ৳1230 crore (US$100 million) (2024-2025)
- Agency executives: AMM Nasir Uddin, Chief Election Commissioner; Md Anwarul Islam Sarker, Election Commissioner; Abdur Rahmanel Masud, Election Commissioner; Tahmida Ahmed, Election Commissioner; Abul Fazal Muhammad Sanaullah, Election Commissioner
- Website: www.ecs.gov.bd

The Bangladesh Election Commission (Bengali: বাংলাদেশ নির্বাচন কমিশন), abbreviated and publicly referred to as EC, is an independent constitutional body that enforces the legal provisions of election laws in Bangladesh.

Article 118 of the Bangladeshi Constitution allows the commission to be formed consisting of a Chief Election Commissioner alongside a number of assisting Election Commissioners under permission granted by the President of Bangladesh.

== Structure ==
The appointment of the chief election commissioner of Bangladesh and other election commissioners (if any) is made by the president. When the election commission consists of more than one person, the chief election commissioner is to act as its chairman. Under the constitution, the term of office of any election commissioner is five years from the date of assuming office. A person who has held office as chief election commissioner is not eligible for appointment in the service of the Republic. Any other election commissioner is, on ceasing to hold such office, eligible for appointment as chief election commissioner, but is not eligible for appointment in the service of the Republic.

Election Commission
Office	Name	Role	Since
Chief Election Commissioner	AMM Nasir Uddin	Chairman	
Election Commissioner	Md Anwarul Islam Sarker	Election Administration	
Election Commissioner	Tahmida Ahmed	Investigation and Adjudication	
Election Commissioner	Abdur Rahmanel Masud	Public Participation	
Election Commissioner	Abul Fazal Md Sanaullah	General Administration	
Secretary	Akhter Ahmed	Election Commission Secretariat	

== History ==
The Election Commission was formed on 23 March 1956 as the Election Commission of Pakistan, and after Bangladesh Liberation War, it has been restructured, reformed and renamed in 1972 to its present from.

== List of chief election commissioners ==
The following have held the post of the chief election commissioner of Bangladesh.

No.	Name (birth–death)	Image	Start of term	End of term	Length of term	Appointed by (President of Bangladesh)	Ref.
1	Justice M. Idris (? – ?)		7 July 1972	7 July 1977	5 years, 0 days	Abu Sayeed Chowdhury	
2	Justice A.K.M. Nurul Islam (1919 – 2015)		8 July 1977	17 February 1985	7 years, 194 days	Ziaur Rahman	
3	Justice Chowdhury A.T.M. Masud (1924 - 2013)		17 February 1985	17 February 1990	5 years, 0 days	Hussain Muhammad Ershad	
4	Justice Sultan Hossain Khan (1924 – 2015)		17 February 1990	24 December 1990	310 days	Hussain Muhammad Ershad	
5	Justice Mohammad Abdur Rouf (1934 – 2025)		25 December 1990	18 April 1995	4 years, 114 days	Shahabuddin Ahmed	
6	Justice A.K.M. Sadeq (1928 – 2016)		27 April 1995	6 April 1996	345 days	Abdur Rahman Biswas	
7	Mohammad Abu Hena (born 1937)		9 April 1996	8 May 2000	4 years, 29 days	Abdur Rahman Biswas	
8	M. A. Sayed (1937 – 2013)		23 May 2000	22 May 2005	4 years, 364 days	Shahabuddin Ahmed	
9	Justice M. A. Aziz (born 1939)		23 May 2005	21 January 2007	1 year, 243 days	Iajuddin Ahmed	
10	Dr. A. T. M. Shamsul Huda (1943 - 2025)		5 February 2007	5 February 2012	5 years, 0 days	Iajuddin Ahmed	
11	Kazi Rakibuddin Ahmed (born 1943)		9 February 2012	9 February 2017	5 years, 0 days	Zillur Rahman	
12	K. M. Nurul Huda (born 1948)		15 February 2017	17 February 2022	5 years, 2 days	Abdul Hamid	
13	Kazi Habibul Awal (born 1956)		27 February 2022	5 September 2024	2 years, 191 days	Abdul Hamid	
14	AMM Nasir Uddin (born 1953)		22 November 2024	Incumbent	1 year, 325 days	Mohammed Shahabuddin	

== Functions and powers ==
Powers of the Election Commission (Article 118(4) and 126 of the constitution, read with Article 4 of the Representation of the People Order, 1972): The Election Commission is an independent constitutional body in the exercise of its functions and subject only to the Constitution and any other law. The Commission may authorize its chairman or any of its members or any of its officers to exercise and perform all or any of its powers and functions under the law. Article 126 of the constitution and Articles 4 and 5 of the Representation of the People Order, 1972 provide that it shall be the duty of all executive authorities to assist the election commission in the discharge of its functions. The commission has the power to require any person or authority to perform such functions or render such assistance for the purpose of election as it may direct.

=== Guardian of free and fair elections ===
It oversees government elections parliamentary elections and local elections) as well as referendums throughout Bangladesh. Established by the 1972 Constitution, the Election Commission (EC) has extensive powers to manage, oversee, and regulate the electoral process.

=== Registration of political parties ===
A law regarding this registration process was enacted in 2008 and number of parties got registered with the commission. It helps to avoid confusion and headache of the administrative machinery as well as confusion of the electorate. It ensures that political parties can practice democracy only by their registration. The commission has the power to investigate the finances and donor lists of all political parties.

=== Prohibition on publication ===
The commission can issue an order for the prohibition of publication and disseminating of results of opinion polls or exit polls to prevent influencing the voting trends in the electorate.

=== Quasi judicial powers ===
The commission has quasi-legal powers as a law enforcement agency to investigate and indict those who compromise election laws through bribery, corruption, vote buying, or blackmail.

== Secretariat ==
=== Central ===
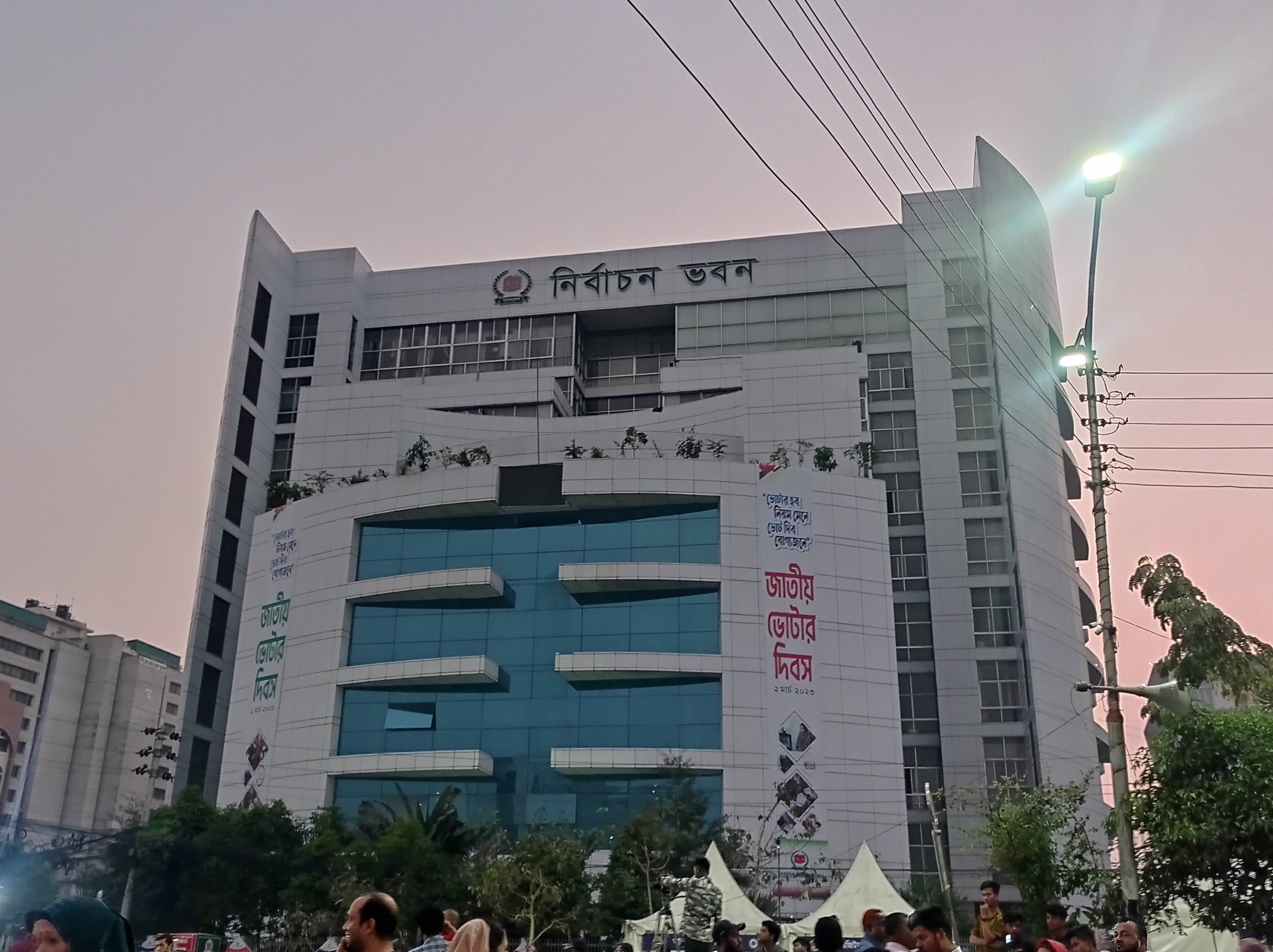
Bangladesh Election Commission secretariat

Bangladesh Election Commission has its own secretariat as per the Election Commission Secretariat Act 2009, which is headed by a secretary. The secretariat is located at Agargaon in Dhaka city and has Electoral Training Institutes and field offices at the Regional, District and Upazila/Thana levels. Functions of the Election Commission Secretariat is to execute the decisions and orders of the commission.

The present secretary of the election commission is Akhter Ahmed.

=== Regional ===
There are Election Offices located at 7 Divisional Headquarters and 3 other districts. Functions of the divisional offices are to maintain liaison between the Election Commission Secretariat and the subordinate field level offices, and to co-ordinate the works relating to conduct of all types of elections, new registrations and periodic updates to the voters list and preparation of electoral rolls including day-to-day amendment and correction in the list of electoral rolls and other matters as and when entrusted by the Election Commission.

=== District office ===
There are 83 District Election Offices in the 64 District Headquarters headed by District Election Officers. They carry out all work relating to registration of voters, printing of voters list, management of national and local level elections, training of polling personnel and all logistical arrangements for elections. As an officer of the Election Commission, the District Election Officer renders all possible assistance to the Returning Officers and polling personnels with forms, packets, manuals, instructions and supply of ballot boxes, electoral rolls, ballot papers and maintains all accounts for expenses incurred for different elections.

=== Sub-district office ===
At the lowest tier of the field organization, there are Upazila/Thana Election Officers at every Upazila/Thanas. The main function of the Upazila/Thana Election Officers are to assist divisional/district offices in the discharge of functions relating to elections.

== Controversy ==
=== Corruption allegations ===
On December 19, 2020, 42 eminent citizens of Bangladesh urged the President to constitute a supreme judicial council to probe the corruption allegations against the Chief Election Commissioner KM Nurul Huda and his deputies. The allegations included misappropriation of around 20 million Bangladeshi taka for imaginary programs, embezzlement of 40.8 million BDT during the recruitment process of election commission staff, purchasing the electronic voting machine at a higher price than the market rate, usage of extra cars by three election commissioners flouting rules.

== See also ==
- Chief Election Commissioner of Bangladesh
- Election Commissioner of Bangladesh
- Elections in Bangladesh
