= Helal Uddin Ahmed =

Bangladeshi government official

- হেলালুদ্দীন আহমদ

Member Bangladesh Public Service Commission
- Incumbent
- Assumed office 17 May 2023
- Appointed by: President of Bangladesh
- President: Mohammed Shahabuddin

Senior Secretary Local Government Division
- In office 30 May 2019 – 22 May 2019
- Prime Minister: Sheikh Hasina
- Preceded by: S. M. Ghulam Faruque
- Succeeded by: Mohammad Mezbah Uddin Chowdhury

Secretary Bangladesh Election Commission Secretariat
- In office 30 July 2017 – 29 May 2019
- Preceded by: Muhammad Abdullah
- Succeeded by: Md. Alamgir

Personal details
- Born: 23 May 1963 (age 63) Eidgaon, Cox's Bazar, East Pakistan
- Education: University of Chittagong
- Occupation: Government official
- Profession: Former Senior Secretary

Helal Uddin Ahmed (born 23 May 1963) is a retired Bangladeshi government official who is currently a member of the Bangladesh Public Service Commission.He served as the Senior Secretary to the Ministry of Local Government, Rural Development and Co-operatives previously. Helal Uddin Ahmed conducted the 11th National Parliament Election, 2018, which was held on 30 December 2018 while serving as the Secretary of Bangladesh Election Commission.

== Early life ==
Ahmed was born on 23 May 1963 in Cox's Bazar of the then East Pakistan (now Bangladesh). He obtained his graduate and postgraduate degree in zoology from Chittagong University in 1983 and 1984 respectively. Later, he obtained orientation degree from Duke University.

== Career ==
Ahmed joined the Bangladesh Civil Service in the Administration Cadre in February 1988 as an Assistant Commissioner and 1st Class Magistrate in Kishoreganj District and also in Sylhet District. He served as Senior Assistant Commissioner, Metropolitan Magistrate, Upazilla Nirbahi Officer, Additional District Magistrate, Private Secretary to the Mayor, Chittagong City Corporation. He later served as the Deputy Commissioner and District Magistrate in Faridpur District from March 2009 to December 2012. He was also the managing director of Bangladesh Overseas Employment and Services Limited. Later, he served as Divisional Commissioner of Rajshahi Division from 2013 to 2016 and then Divisional Commissioner of Dhaka Division from 2016 to 2017.

The Government of Bangladesh appointed him as the Secretary in charge of the Election Commission Secretariat on 30 July 2017 and he was promoted to Secretary on 20 February 2018. On 26 May 2019 he was appointed as Secretary to the Ministry of Local Government, Rural Development and Co-operatives of Bangladesh. Subsequently, he was promoted to the rank of Senior Secretary in January 2020. Ahmed was the president of the Bangladesh Administrative Service from 2019 to 2021.

Ahmed was the secretary of the Election Commission of Bangladesh during the 2018 Bangladeshi general election. As the secretary, he allegedly received a remuneration of 4.7 million BDT, an abnormally high amount, for the role of ‘course consultant’. He also received sizable amount of fees for "special speeches" as "special speaker" at the training programs for the 11th national parliamentary election and the Upazila polls. In 2020 Forty-two eminent citizens requested president Abdul Hamid to constitute a Supreme Judicial Council inquiry into corruption allegations against the chief election commissioner and election commissioners on 19 December 2020, and declared the sending of a letter with details over a virtual conference.

Ahmed went on a 10-day study tour in Europe using government money just one day before his retirement. Which is very unusual according to experts, who said, it was "unethical" and complete "waste" of money for the government.

On 11 May 2023, Ahmed was appointed as a member of Bangladesh Public Service Commission by the President of Bangladesh for five years. He was arrested in Chittagong after the fall of the Sheikh Hasina led Awami League government. A murder case was filed against him by Bangladesh Nationalist Party politician Mohammad Zaman Hossain Khan over the death of a protestor in July 2024.

== Awards and recognition ==
- Best Divisional Commissioner's Award (2016)
- Public Service Innovation Award (2016)
