= AMM Nasir Uddin =

14th Chief Election Commissioner of Bangladesh

- এ এম এম নাসির উদ্দিন
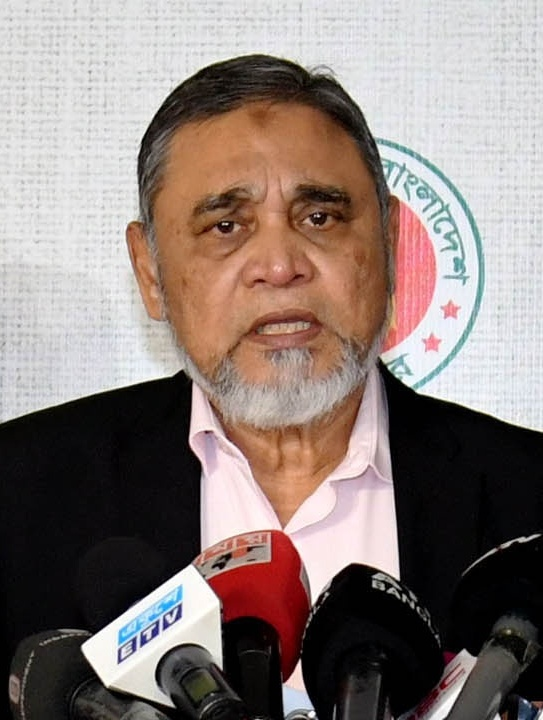
- Nasir Uddin in 2025

14th Chief Election Commissioner of Bangladesh
- Incumbent
- Assumed office 22 November 2024
- President: Mohammed Shahabuddin; Hafiz Uddin Ahmad (acting); Mirza Fakhrul Islam Alamgir
- Prime Minister: Tarique Rahman; Muhammad Yunus (acting)
- Preceded by: Kazi Habibul Awal

Personal details
- Born: 1 July 1953 (age 73) Kutubdia, Cox's Bazar, East Pakistan
- Education: University of Chittagong
- Profession: Civil Servant

AMM Nasir Uddin is a retired Secretary to the Government of Bangladesh and the current chief election commissioner of Bangladesh. He is the former secretary of the Ministry of Health and Family Welfare, Ministry of Power, Energy and Mineral Resources, Ministry of Information and Broadcasting, and Member to the Bangladesh Planning Commission.

== Early life and education ==
Uddin was born in Moulvi Bari in Boroghope, Kutubdia Upazila, Cox's Bazar District. His father, Taleb Ullah, was a school teacher. He passed his Secondary School Certificate Examination with 1st division in 1968. He secured 3rd position in Cumilla Board. He passed his Higher Secondary School Certificate Examination in 1970.

== Career ==
Uddin joined the Bangladesh Civil Service in 1979 as an administration cadre officer.

Uddin was appointed secretary of the Ministry of Power, Energy and Mineral Resources in June 2005. He was the socio economic infrastructure member of the Bangladesh Planning Commission. He was appointed to the post eight days after the Minister, A. K. M. Mosharraf Hossain, resigned.

In October 2007, Uddin was a member of the Planning Commission. He was the former secretary of the Energy and Mineral Resources Division.

Previously, Uddin served as the Secretary of the Ministry of Information and Broadcasting where he was also heading the chair for Bangladesh Film Certification Board.

Uddin later served as the secretary of the Ministry of Health and Family Welfare. He stopped the usage of Miltefosine in Bangladesh. He introduced Hib vaccine in Bangladesh.

Uddin retired in January 2009.

Uddin was appointed chief election commissioner in November 2024. His name was proposed by the Bangladesh Nationalist Party, Bangladesh Jamaat-e-Islami, Amar Bangladesh Party, Biplobi Communist Party, and 16 other political parties. The four election commissioners under him were Md Anwarul Islam Sarker, Abdur Rahmanel Masud, Tahmida Ahmed, and Abul Fazal Md Sanaullah. He was sworn in by Chief Justice Syed Refaat Ahmed.

In 2024, the Chief Election Commissioner AMM Nasir Uddin along with the rest of the commissioners and Chief Justice Syed Refaat Ahmed
