= Mahmud Hasan Monsur =

Bangladeshi civil servant and election commissioner

Mahmood Hasan Mansur is a Bangladeshi civil servant and former Election Commissioner of Bangladesh.

== Career ==
Mansur served in the Bangladesh Civil Service. From 5 July 2000 to 25 July 2000, he served as the General of Accounts at the Office of the Director of Accounts. He succeeded Asif Ali. In 2004, he was the chairman of the Bangladesh Road Transport Authority.

Mansur was the secretary in the Ministry of Posts, Telecommunications and Information Technology. He was associated with a number of administrative decisions and procurement processes in the telecommunications sector. He faced criticism over allegations of conflict of interest related to foreign travel funded by a company involved in government procurement. A government oversight body reportedly raised concerns about the propriety of such trips while procurement decisions involving the same company were under consideration.

In September 2006, Monsur was appointed as an election commissioner. His appointment was controversial because he was appointed without consulting the opposition party. The opposition Awami League, led by a 14-party alliance, accused him of being partial to the ruling Bangladesh Nationalist Party. He served under the Chief Election Commissioner M. A. Aziz. In November 2006, his house was shot up by unidentified individuals on Sir Syed Ahmed Road in Mohammadpur. He served as the Election Commissioner till 31 January 2007 when all the commissioners resigned in the face of protests.

Mansur joined a dialogue with the Election Commission in 2017.
