= Md. Saiful Alam (judge) =

Bangladeshi judge

Md. Saiful Alam is a Bangladeshi former judge, law academic, and former election commissioner. He currently serves as chair and dean in charge of the Faculty of Law at ASA University Bangladesh. He served as an Election Commissioner of the Bangladesh Election Commission from 27 November 2006 to 31 January 2007.

== Biography ==
Md. Saiful Alam received his Bachelor of Laws and Master of Laws degrees from the University of Rajshahi. He also holds a Master of Commerce degree from the same university. He served as a district and sessions judge for ten years, and subsequently served as a director general of the Anti Corruption Commission.

Alam was appointed an Election Commissioner of the Bangladesh Election Commission on 27 November 2006 and served in that position until 31 January 2007. He then taught law at Atish Dipankar University of Science and Technology for five years. He is currently serving as chair and dean in charge of the Faculty of Law at ASA University Bangladesh.

== Controversy ==
Saiful Alam was one of the members of the controversial Aziz Commission. According to Peter Eicher, Dr. Zahurul Alam, and Jeremy Eckstein, the Chief Election Commissioner M. A. Aziz took three months’ leave amid "public pressure", and Justice Mahfuzur Rahman became the acting CEC. Saiful Alam and Modabbir Hossain Chowdhury were appointed by the President some days later. The commission scheduled the ninth parliamentary elections for January 22, 2007. However, amid escalating political conflict, the elections were canceled following the declaration of a state of emergency, and the commission was ultimately forced to resign. After the state of emergency was declared on January 11, 2007, the entire Election Commission left office on January 31, when the military-backed caretaker government led by Fakhruddin Ahmed assumed power.

In an interview with Moinul Haque Chowdhury, Alam reflected on his role in the annulled election, saying, “That [annulled] election doesn't bother me anymore. The past is the past, I don't think about the past anymore. I came for the needs of the state then, I left for the good.”

== Selected Bibliography ==
=== Authored ===
- 100 Years of Criminal Precedents (2023, Unique Law Book House)
- The Penal Code (2025, Unique Law Book House)
- The Code of Criminal Procedure
- The Code of Civil Procedure
- Civil Rules and Orders of the Supreme Court of Bangladesh

=== Translated ===
- Making Your Case
- The Devil's Advocate
- The Art of Cross-Examination
