= Representation of the People Order, 1972 =

Representation of People Order, 1972 (Bengali: গণপ্রতিনিধিত্ব আদেশ, ১৯৭২) is a set of laws governing how members of parliament are elected, the role of the Election Commission, and registration of Bangladeshi political parties.

== History ==
The Representation of People Order was promulgated on 26 December 1972 and repealed the Legal Framework Order and the National and Provincial Assemblies (Election) Ordinance of 1970. The law governs the election of members of parliament in Bangladesh and the registration of political parties with the Election Commission. Political parties must meet three conditions under the ordinance to register with the Election Commission. It tasks the Election Commission with providing returning officers for each parliamentary constituency during elections.

The Order was amended in August 2008 through the Representative of People Order (Amendment) Ordinance which was passed in the parliament in 2009.

In 2018, the Order was further amended through the Representation of the People Order (amendment) Order, 2018 which allowed the use of electronic voting machines in elections. The Executive Committee of the National Economic Council approved 38.25 billion taka for the purchase of electronic voting machines.

In 2020, the Election Commission tried to reduce their own power through a proposed amendment to the Order and creating a separate Registration of Political Parties Act, 2020. Ali Imam Majumder, Shahdeen Malik, Badiul Alam Majumder, M Hafizuddin Khan, and other political commentators criticised the move. Mahbub Talukder, an election commissioner, sent a dissent note on the proposal.

== See also ==
- 2006–2008 Bangladeshi political crisis
