= Election Commissioner of Bangladesh =

Government commissioner on elections

Election Commissioners of Bangladesh
- বাংলাদেশের নির্বাচন কমিশনারগণ
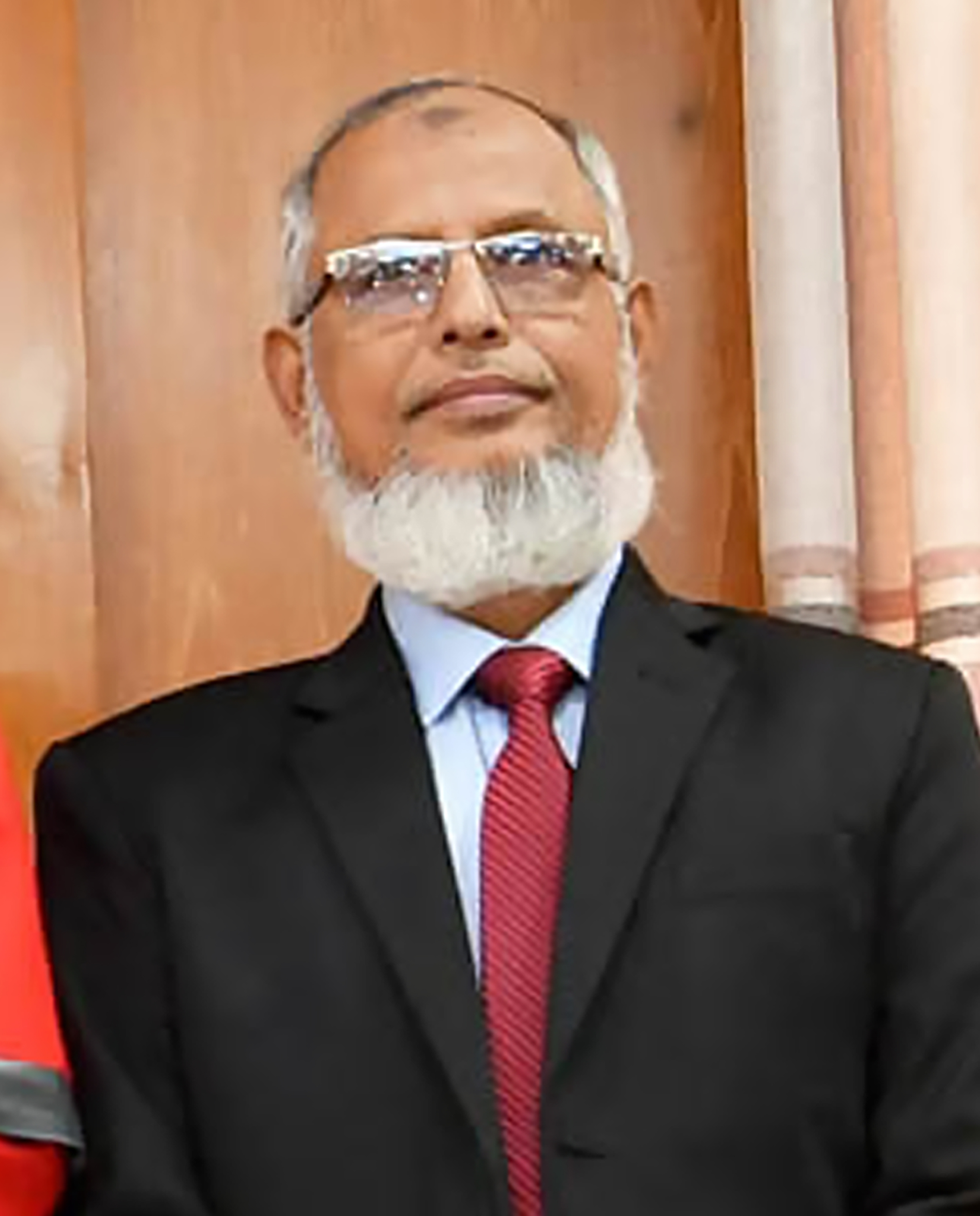
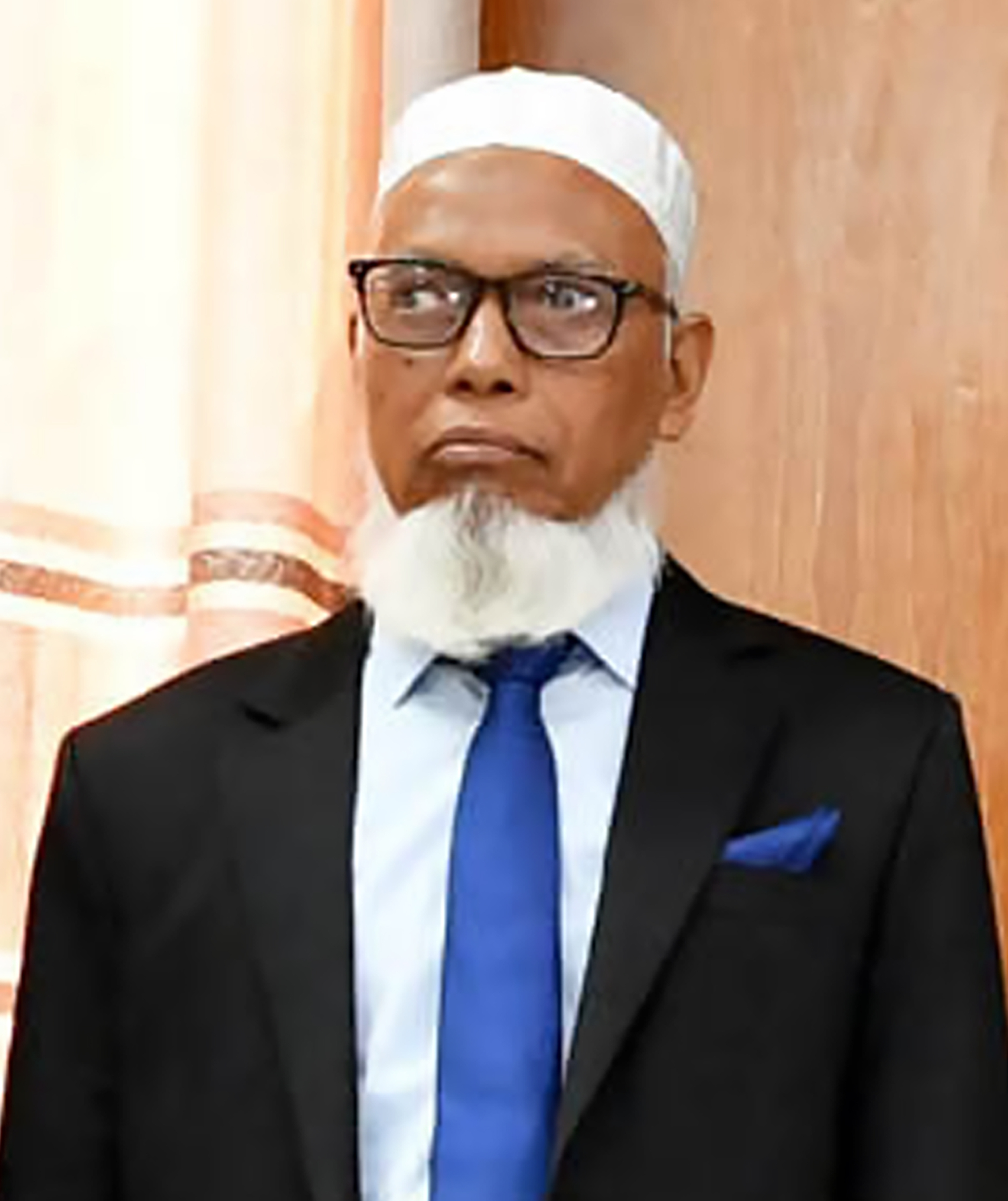
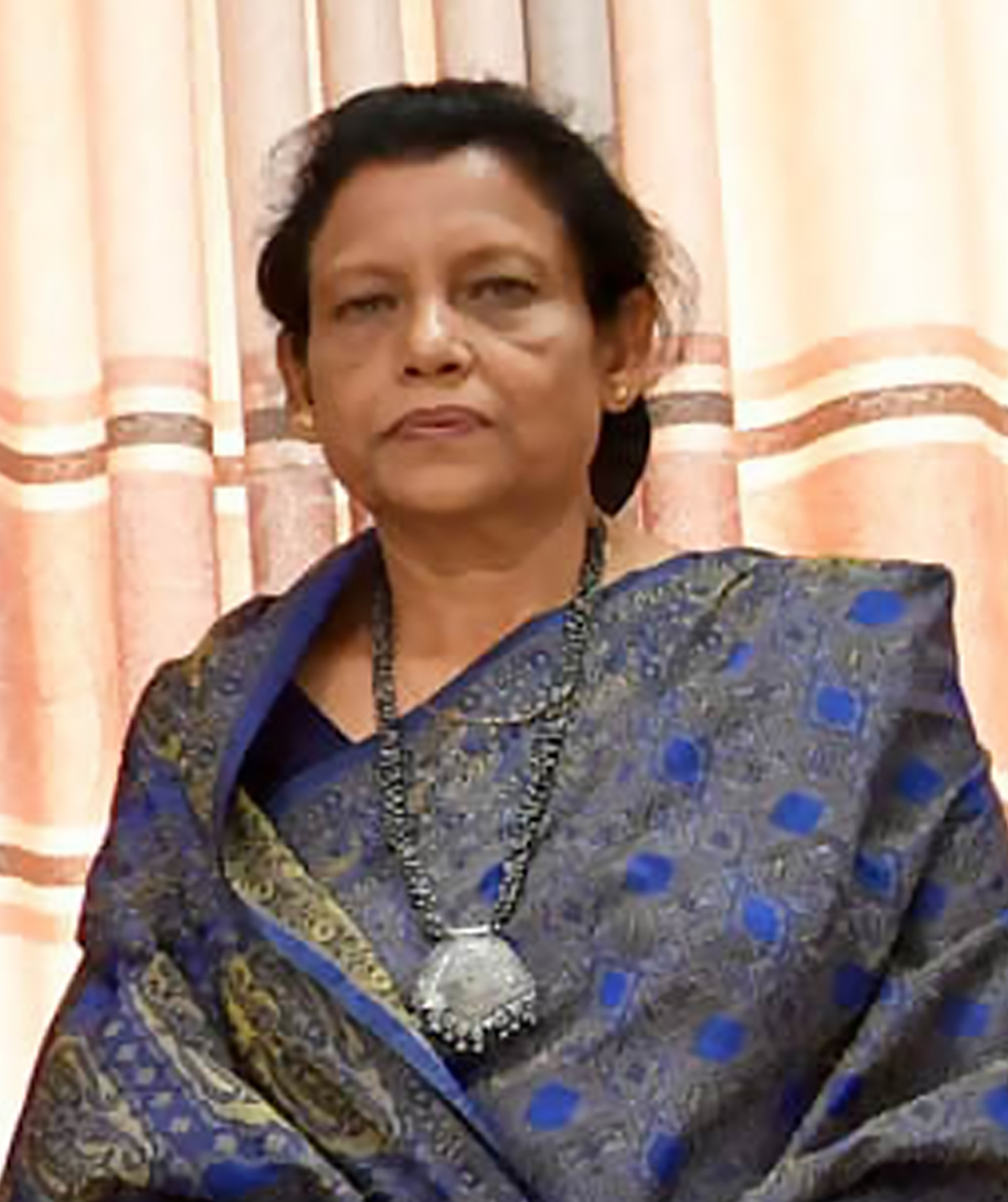
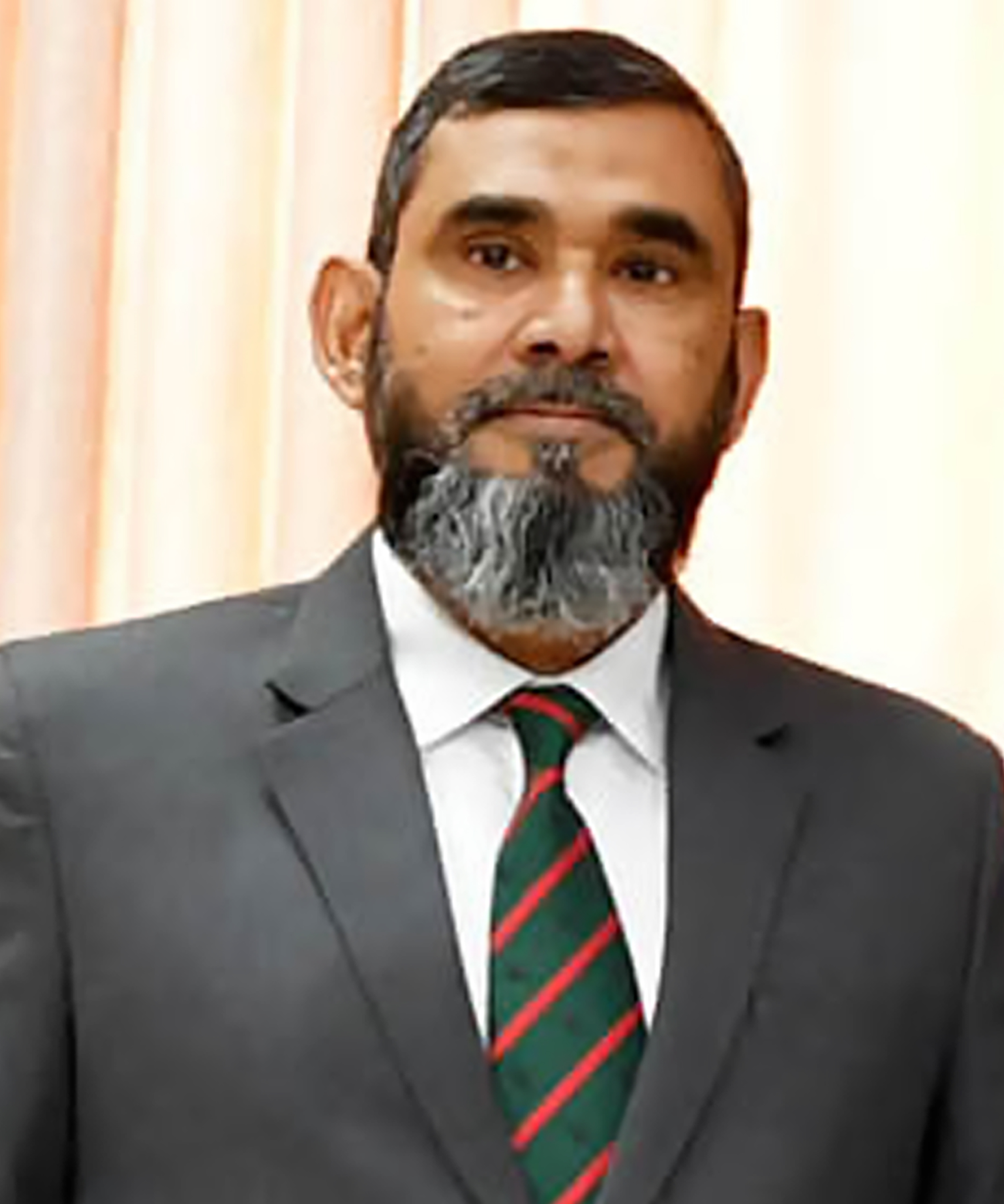
- Incumbent; Md Anwarul Islam Sarker; Abdur Rahmanel Masud; Tahmida Ahmed; Abul Fazal Md Sanaullah since 22 November 2024
- Bangladesh Election Commission
- Type: Executive Officers
- Abbreviation: EC
- Member of: Bangladesh Election Commission
- Reports to: Chief Election Commissioner of Bangladesh
- Seat: Nirbachon Bhobon, Agargaon, Dhaka
- Appointer: President of Bangladesh
- Term length: Five years
- Inaugural holder: Nur Mohammad Khan
- Formation: 7 July 1972; 54 years ago
- Salary: ৳142500 (US$1,200) per month (incl. allowanced)
- Website: ecs.gov.bd

Election Commissioners of Bangladesh (Bengali: বাংলাদেশের নির্বাচন কমিশনার), publicly referred to as EC, are members of Bangladesh Election Commission, who are bestowed upon the responsibility to arrange and oversee the conduct of free and fair national and regional elections, empowered by the commission.

Article 118 of the Bangladeshi constitution instructs the state to organise an independent agency, which will be free of political and government influences, consisting of one Chief Election Commissioner and four more assisting Election Commissioners with direct approval of the state president.

== Appointment and removal ==
The appointment of the Chief Election Commissioner of Bangladesh and other Election Commissioners is made by the president. The Chief Election Commissioner is to act as chairman of the Election Commission of Bangladesh. Under the Constitution the term of office of any Election Commissioner is five years from the date on which he enters upon office. A person who has held office as Chief Election Commissioner is not eligible for appointment in the service of the Republic. Any other Election Commissioner is, on ceasing to hold such office, eligible for appointment as Chief Election Commissioner, but is not eligible for appointment in the service of the Republic.

== List ==
Name	Year
Md Anwarul Islam Sarker	21 November 2024 to present
Begum Tahmida Ahmad	21 November 2024 to present
Abdur Rahmanel Masud	21 November 2024 to present
Md Alamgir	26 February 2022 to 5 September 2024
Ahsan Habib Khan	26 February 2022 to 5 September 2024
Rashida Sultana	26 February 2022 to 5 September 2024
Shahadat Hossain Chowdhury	15 February 2017 to 14 February 2022
Kabita Khanam	15 February 2017 to 14 February 2022
Mahbub Talukder	15 February 2017 to 14 February 2022
Md Rafiqul Islam	15 February 2017 to 14 February 2022
Mohammad Shahnewaz	15 February 2012 to 15 February 2017
Brigadier General Md. Zabed Ali (Retd.)	9 February 2012 to 9 February 2017
Mohammad Abu Hafiz	9 February 2012 to 9 February 2017
Mohammad Abdul Mobarak	9 February 2012 to 9 February 2017
Brigadier General Muhammad Sakhawat Hussain ndc, psc (Retd)	14 February 2007 to 14 February 2012
Muhammed Sohul Hussain	5 February 2007 to 5 February 2012
Md. Saiful Alam	27 November 2006 to 31 January 2007
Modabbir Hossain Chowdhury	27 November 2006 to 31 January 2007
Mahmud Hasan Monsur	4 September 2006 to 31 January 2007
S. M. Zakaria	16 January 2006 to 31 January 2007
Justice Mahfuzur Rahman	16 January 2006 to 31 January 2007
M. M. Munsef Ali	19 April 2001 to 19 April 2006
A. K. Mohammad Ali	19 April 2001 to 19 April 2006
Shafiur Rahman	25 June 2000 to 25 June 2005
Mustak Ahmed Chowdhury	16 April 1996 to 16 April 2001
Abidur Rahman	16 April 1996 to 16 April 2001
Justice Md. Abdul Jalil	7 May 1994 to 9 April 1996
Justice Sayad Misbah Uddin Hossain	28 December 1990 to 10 February 1994
Justice Amin-ur-Rahman Khan	16 December 1990 to 25 December 1990
Justice Noyem Uddin Ahmad	16 December 1990 to 4 April 1991
Justice Sultan Hossain Khan	11 January 1987 to 16 February 1987
Abdul Mumit Chowdhury	20 October 1978 to 31 December 1986
Nur Mohammad Khan	7 July 1972 to 7 July 1977

== See also ==
- Election Commission of Bangladesh
- Chief Election Commissioner of Bangladesh
- Elections in Bangladesh
