= Shahadat Hossain Chowdhury =

Retired Brigadier general of Bangladesh Army and Election Commissioner of Bangladesh

- শাহাদাত হোসেন চৌধুরী
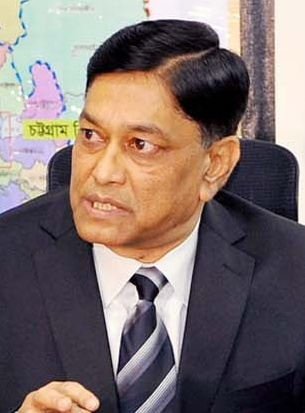
- Chowdhury in 2018

Election Commissioner of Bangladesh
- In office 15 February 2017 – 14 February 2022
- President: Abdul Hamid
- Preceded by: Zabed Ali
- Succeeded by: Ahsan Habib Khan

Personal details
- Born: 1 April 1959 (age 67) Companiganj, East Pakistan, Pakistan
- Spouse: Sarwat Chowdhury
- Education: Chittagong University
- Profession: Military officer, Election Commissioner

Military service
- Allegiance: Bangladesh
- Branch/service: Bangladesh Army
- Years of service: 1982–2010
- Rank: Brigadier General
- Unit: Armoured Corps
- Commands: Commandant of Armoured Corps Centre and School; COD of ARTDOC; Commander of 93rd Armoured Brigade

Shahadat Hossain Chowdhury (afwc, psc, te) (born 1959) is a retired brigadier general of the Bangladesh Army who also served as one of the election commissioners of Bangladesh during 2017-2022.

== Early life ==
Chowdhury was born in 1959 in Companiganj Upazila of Noakhali district of the then East Pakistan (now Bangladesh) to Ali Imam Chowdhury and Ferdous Ara Begum. He is the second among his five siblings. He completed his Secondary School Certificate from Basurhat A. H. C. Government High School in 1974 and Higher Secondary School Certificate from Chittagong College in 1976. He earned his graduation in mathematics from Chittagong University.

== Career ==
On 7 February 2017, President Abdul Hamid appointed Chowdhury to the post of election commissioner in the Bangladesh Election Commission under Chief Election Commissioner KM Nurul Huda.

Chowdhury oversaw the 11th parliamentary elections of Bangladesh in 2018.
