= Mahfuzur Rahman (election commissioner) =

Election Commissioner in Bangladesh

- মাহফুজুর রহমান

Justice of the High Court Division of Bangladesh

Personal details
- Born: February 1, 1935
- Died: May 5, 2016
- Profession: Judge

Mahfuzur Rahman was a judge of the High Court Division and a commissioner of the Bangladesh Election Commission.

== Early life ==
Mahfuzur Rahman was born on 1 February 1935 in Comilla, the son of Khan Bahadur Siddiqur Rahman. He completed his bachelor's degrees of art and law from the University of Dhaka in 1959 and 1962 respectively.

== Career ==
Mahfuzur Rahman became a lawyer of the Dhaka High Court in 1963. In 1980, Mahfuzur Rahman became a lawyer of the Appellate Division.

Mahfuzur Rahman was appointed a judge of the High Court Division in 1992. In 2001 Mahfuzur Rahman was the judge of the Administrative Appellate Tribunal.

Mahfuzur Rahman was appointed an election commissioner of the Bangladesh Election Commission on 15 January 2006 by President Iajuddin Ahmed. In November he was the temporary Chief Election Commissioner of Bangladesh.

The Election Commission failed to conduct the parliamentary elections scheduled for 22 January 2007, which it formally cancelled after the withdrawal by the Awami League. The resultant uproar led the Army to demand that Iajuddin Ahmed declare a state of emergency and resign, appointing an Interim Chief Advisor. On 1 February 2007, Mahfuzur Rahman and the other election commissioners resigned after being invited to tea by Iajuddin Ahmed. An unnamed Commissioner commented at the time, "It was not a healthy discussion. All of us are not responsible for the prevailing situation in the Election Commission, but we became the victims of the situation."

== Death ==
Mahfuzur Rahman died on 5 May 2016 in Mohammadpur, Dhaka, Bangladesh.
