= Kabita Khanam =

Election Commissioner of Bangladesh

- কবিতা খানম

Election Commissioner of Bangladesh
- In office 15 February 2017 – 14 February 2022
- President: Abdul Hamid

Personal details
- Born: 30 June 1957 (age 69)
- Education: University of Rajshahi
- Known for: judge, election commissioner

Begum Kabita Khanam (born 30 June 1957) is a Bangladeshi former district and sessions judge who served as one of the Election Commissioners of Bangladesh. President of Bangladesh Abdul Hamid appointed her as Election Commissioner on 15 February 2017 which makes her the first ever female Election Commissioner in Bangladesh.

== Early life ==
Khanam was born on 30 June 1957 in Ukilpara village under Sadar upazila of Naogaon District of the then East Pakistan (now Bangladesh) to Mohammad Bazlul Haque and Gul-e-Raihan. She is the fourth child among the four sons and four daughters of her parents. She completed her Secondary School Certificate from Naogaon Government Girls High School in 1972 and Higher Secondary School Certificate from Naogaon Government BMC Women College in 1974. She obtained her Graduation in 1977 and master's degree in 1978 in Zoology from Rajshahi University. She also earned Bachelor of Laws degree in 1981 from the same university.

== Career ==
Khanam joined the Rajshahi Munsef Court on 22 February 1984 as a judicial cadre. She was promoted as joint district judge in 1994, additional district judge in 2000 and district judge in 2006. Besides Rajshahi, She also worked in Chapainawabganj District. She retired as Senior District & Session Judge from Rajshahi District on 30 June 2016.

From 15 February 2017 to 14 February 2022, she served in the five members Election Commission, led by KM Nurul Huda.

== Personal life ==
Khanam was married to Rajshahi's Chief Metropolitan Magistrate Moshiur Rahman Chowdhury in her personal life. Her husband died in 2011. The couple has a son and a daughter.
