= Mohammad Shahnewaz =

Election Commissioner of Bangladesh
- In office 15 February 2012 – 15 February 2017
- President: Zillur Rahman
- Prime Minister: Sheikh Hasina
- Chief Election Commissioner: Kazi Rakibuddin Ahmad

Personal details
- Born: 16 September 1950 (age 75) Tippera District, East Bengal, Dominion of Pakistan
- Known for: Former election commissioner

Mohammad Shahnewaz (born 16 September 1950) is a former Election Commissioner of Bangladesh. He served in this role from 15 February 2012 to 15 February 2017.

== Early life and education ==
He was born on 16 September 1950 in Tippera District, East Bengal, Dominion of Pakistan (present-day Chandpur District, Bangladesh).

== Career ==
After completing his legal training, Shahnewaz began practicing law in 1980. He become a District and Sessions Judge in Tangail, from which position he retired in 2008.

On 15 February 2012, Shahnewaz was sworn in as an Election Commissioner by the Chief Justice Mohammad Muzammel Hossain. His appointment came after the expiry of the previous commissioner M Shakhawat Hossain's term.

During his term, Shahnewaz frequently appeared before the media as an official spokesperson for the commission.
