= Muhammed Sohul Hussain =

Election Commissioner of Bangladesh

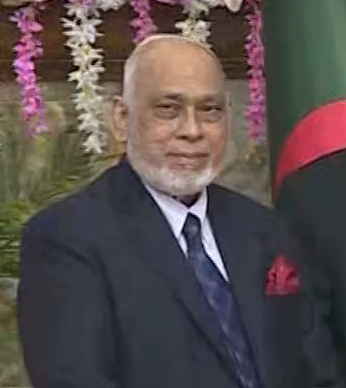

Muhammed Sohul Hussain is a former election commissioner of Bangladesh who served during the 2006–2008 Bangladeshi political crisis. In 2022, he was part of the search committee created to appoint new election commissioners.

== Career ==
Hussain was the secretary at the Ministry of Law.

Hussain was appointed the election commissioner on 5 February 2007. The entire commission had resigned before his appointment. M Sakhawat Hossain was appoint his fellow commissioner and A. T. M. Shamsul Huda was appointed the chief commission. In July 2007, he announced that the commission will not meet political parties due to the ban on indoor political activities by the caretaker government.

In October 2010, Justices A. H. M. Shamsuddin Chowdhury Manik and Sheikh Md. Zakir Hossain of the High Court Division found Hussain had him guilty on contempt of court charges for declaring the parliamentary seat of Muhiuddin Khan Alamgir vacant. The court exonerated him because Muhiuddin Khan Alamgir asked the court that Hussain not be punished due to his age.

Hussain served as the election commissioner till 5 February 2012.

In 2022, Hussain was appointed a member of the search committee to find the new election commissioners. The Bangladesh Nationalist Party rejected the committee as being partisan.
