= Anisur Rahman (election commissioner) =

Election Commissioner of Bangladesh

- আনিছুর রহমান

Election Commissioner of Bangladesh
- In office 26 February 2022 – 5 September 2024
- President: Abdul Hamid
- Prime Minister: Sheikh Hasina
- Preceded by: Md Anwarul Islam Sarker

Personal details
- Born: 31 December 1962 (age 63)
- Education: University of Dhaka
- Profession: Civil servant

Anisur Rahman (born 31 December 1962) is a Bangladeshi former civil servant and a former Election Commissioner of Bangladesh.

== Early life and education ==
Rahman was born on 31 December 1962 in Shariatpur. He passed SSC from Chandpur Hasan Ali Government High School and HSC from Chandpur Government College and obtained his bachelor's and master's degree from Dhaka University.

== Career ==
Anisur joined the civil service on 15 February 1988 as a member of the 1985 batch of the Bangladesh Civil Service administration cadre.

During Rahman's career he served in various levels of administration including assistant commissioner, upazila executive officer, additional district magistrate and various duties in upazila and district. He held various posts in the Cabinet Department, Local Government Department, Finance Department, Ministry of Home Affairs, and Ministry of Fisheries and Livestock.

Rahman was the secretary of the Ministry of Religious Affairs from April 4, 2018 to January 4, 2020. He joined the Department of Energy and Mineral Resources as secretary on 5 January 2020 and has been the senior secretary since 27 January 2020.

Rahman retired on 31 December 2021 as senior secretary. He was appointed as the Election Commissioner on 26 February 2022. In July 2025, his allotment of a flat in the Dhanmondi Housing Project was cancelled by the government of Bangladesh.
