= Muhammad Zabed Ali =

Retired Brigadier general of Bangladesh Army and Election Commissioner of Bangladesh

- জাবেদ আলী

Election Commissioner of Bangladesh
- In office 9 February 2012 – 9 February 2017
- President: Zillur Rahman; Abdul Hamid
- Preceded by: M Sakhawat Hossain
- Succeeded by: Shahadat Hossain Chowdhury

Personal details
- Education: Chittagong University
- Profession: Military officer, Election Commissioner

Military service
- Allegiance: Bangladesh
- Branch/service: Bangladesh Army
- Years of service: 1979–2008
- Rank: Brigadier General
- Unit: East Bengal Regiment
- Commands: Commandant of East Bengal Regimental Centre; Commander of 21st Infantry Brigade; Commander of 111th Infantry Brigade

Md. Zabed Ali is a retired brigadier general of the Bangladesh Army and former election commissioner of Bangladesh.

== Career ==
On 9 February 2012, Ali was appointed election commissioner of Bangladesh by the Awami League government. His appointment was rejected by the opposition Bangladesh Nationalist Party. He served under Chief Election Commissioner Kazi Rakibuddin Ahmad.

In August 2013, Ali met with foreign diplomats at the Election Commission who stressed the importance of an inclusive election. Ali oversaw the 2014 Bangladeshi general election. The election was boycotted by major political parties led by the Bangladesh Nationalist Party, as it was not held under a neutral caretaker government as per their demands. The election was marred by widespread violence and the death of 18. The Awami League won more than half the seats uncontested due to the opposition boycott.

Ali oversaw municipal elections in December 2015. In November 2016, Ali and other commissioners apologized unconditionally to the Bangladesh High Court for not taking notice of complaints by hundreds of candidates in local elections.

Ali served as the election commissioner of Bangladesh till 9 February 2017, when he was replaced by Brigadier General Shahadat Hossain Chowdhury. Ali and the rest of the commissioners defended their actions in holding the 2014 Bangladeshi general election, which was boycotted by all major opposition parties and saw the Awami League re-elected.

== Bibliography ==
- The Identity of Almighty Allah and Prophets and Man's Actions in the Light of Al-Quran
