= M. Sakhawat Hussain =

Bangladeshi political adviser and former brigadier general

- এম সাখাওয়াত হোসেন
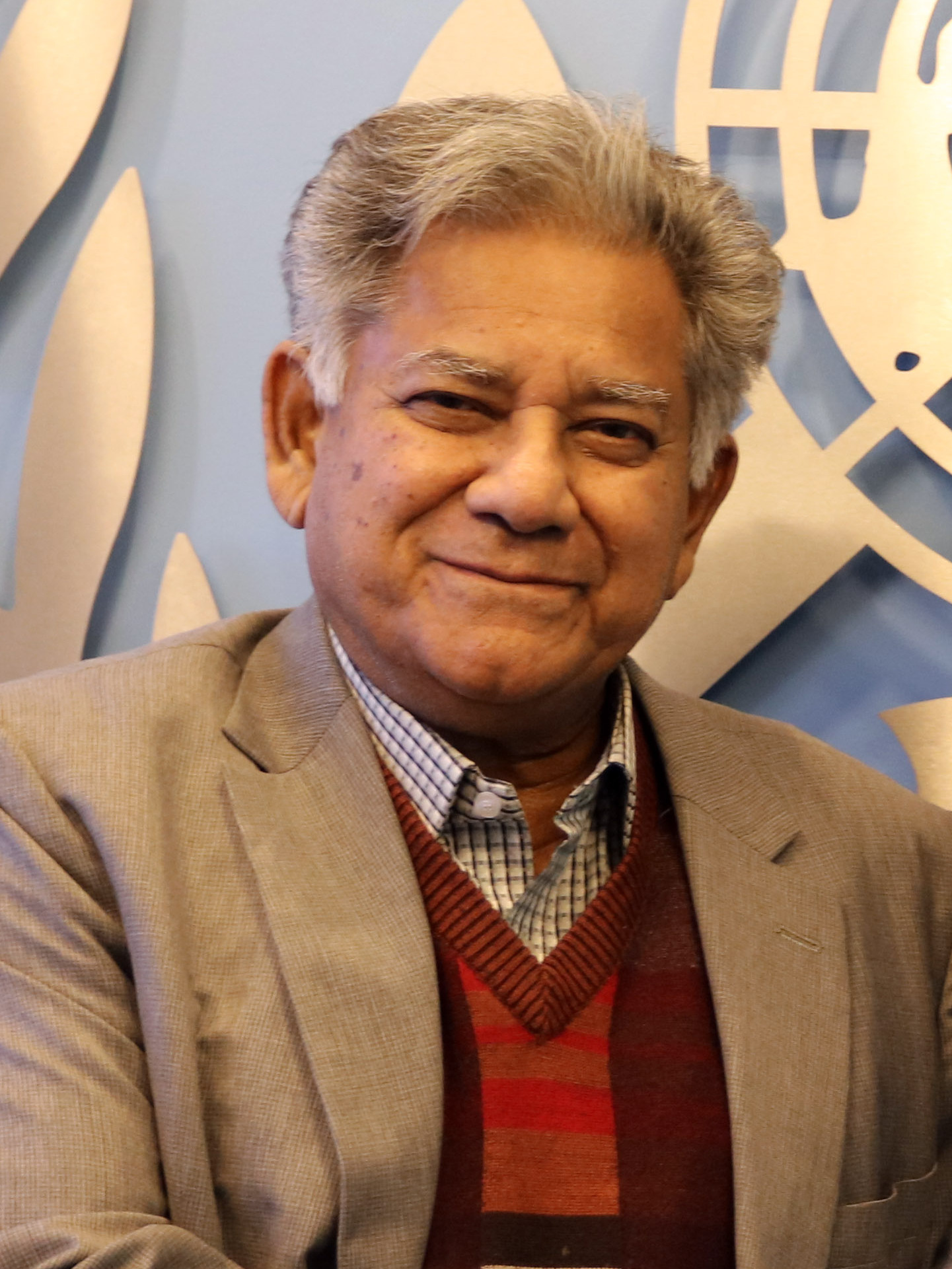
- Hussain at International Maritime Organization headquarters in 2024

Adviser for Shipping
- In office 22 August 2024 – 17 February 2026
- Chief Adviser: Muhammad Yunus
- Preceded by: Khalid Mahmud Chowdhury
- Succeeded by: Shaikh Rabiul Alam

Adviser for Labour and Employment
- In office 10 November 2024 – 17 February 2026
- Chief Adviser: Muhammad Yunus
- Preceded by: Asif Mahmud
- Succeeded by: Ariful Haque Choudhury

Adviser for Textiles and Jute
- In office 16 August 2024 – 10 November 2024
- Chief Adviser: Muhammad Yunus
- Preceded by: Jahangir Kabir Nanak
- Succeeded by: Sheikh Bashir Uddin

Adviser for Home Affairs
- In office 9 August 2024 – 16 August 2024
- Chief Adviser: Muhammad Yunus
- Preceded by: Asaduzzaman Khan
- Succeeded by: Jahangir Alam Chowdhury

Election Commissioner of Bangladesh
- In office 14 February 2007 – 14 February 2012
- President: Iajuddin Ahmed; Zillur Rahman
- Preceded by: Muhammed Sohul Hussain
- Succeeded by: Zabed Ali

Personal details
- Born: 1 February 1948 (age 78) Barisal, East Bengal, Pakistan
- Spouse: Rehana Khanum
- Children: 2
- Education: United States Army Command and General Staff College; Quaid-i-Azam University; Bangladesh University of Professionals

Military service
- Allegiance: Pakistan (Before 1972); Bangladesh
- Branch/service: Pakistan Army; Bangladesh Army; Bangladesh Rifles
- Years of service: 1966-1994
- Rank: Brigadier General
- Unit: Regiment of Artillery
- Commands: Sector Commander of BDR; Commander of 24th Artillery Brigade; Commander of 33rd Artillery Brigade; Commander of 305th Infantry Brigade; Commandant of Artillery Centre and School
- Battles/wars: Chittagong Hill Tracts Conflict

M. Sakhawat Hussain (born 1 February 1948) is a Bangladeshi author, researcher and former one star army officer. He was the Election Commissioner of Bangladesh from 2007 to 2012 and retired from the Bangladesh Army as a brigadier general. He has written more than 32 books, and serves as a columnist and freelance commentator on national and international television as a security and defense analyst. Before joining the interim government, he was the senior fellow at the South Asian Institute of Policy and Governance (SIPG) at North South University. He was also an adviser to the Interim government of Bangladesh since August 2024.

== Early life ==
Hussain was born in Barisal, East Bengal, Dominion of Pakistan on 1 February 1948 in a well known Muslim family of Barisal. He achieved his Secondary School Certificate (SSC) in 1963 from Karachi, Higher Secondary Certificate (HSC) in 1965 from Islamia Science College (Karachi), Pakistan. He passed Command and Staff College Mirpur, Dhaka, Bangladesh in 1979 and obtained symbol PSC. He graduated from the United States Army Command and General Staff College (USACGSC) 1981–1982. He earned a master's degree in strategic studies from the Quaid-i-Azam University, Mphil Pt-11 with NDC, Bangladesh. He qualified from National Defence College, Pakistan obtained symbol NDC.

== Career ==
Hussain was commissioned in the Pakistan Army in 1966 from PMA, Kakul into the 4 Medium Regiment of the Artillery Corps. After completing his young officers' course from Nowshera and Quetta, he joined the regiment as a gun position officer in the forward location at Khuiratta. He was posted in Kutton during the 1971 war as a lieutenant and command post officer, and thereafter taken into internment in August 1971.

Hussain joined the Bangladesh Army in 1972 upon that country's independence and promoted to captain. He served as captain commanding a BDR company in 1972-1974. Promoted to major in 1974, he was brigade GSO-2 (operations) of 46th Infantry Brigade in 1974-1975. He was then made battery commander in 1975-1978, as major and GSO-2 (training) of an artillery brigade 1978-1979, as second in command of an artillery battalion in 1979-1982. He was promoted to lieutenant colonel in 1982 and posted in GHQ as ADC to General Ershad. He commanded an artillery battalion in Comilla Cantonment 1985-1986. Promoted to colonel in 1986, he served in the DGFI until 1988, and thereafter as senior adjutant in the Bangladesh Military Academy until 1991. He commanded the Jessore Sector of Bangladesh Rifles as a colonel until 1994. Promoted to brigadier in 1994, till 1998, he commanded an infantry brigade in Rangamati. Thereafter he commanded two artillery brigades and retired in 2002. Following the 2006–2008 Bangladeshi political crisis, he was appointed as a commissioner in the Election Commission headed by A. T. M. Shamsul Huda in 2007 and served till 2012.

Hussain became an individual researcher in national security and defense, a columnist and security analyst.

As an author, Hussain wrote over 300 articles as columnist on national and international issues in local and international newspapers and journals. He was a freelance commentator. He was a regular military analyst during the Iraq war. He was a leading strategic and defense analyst, a Bangladeshi commentator on security issues for British Broadcasting Corporation (BBC) for Bengali and English World Service, Tehran Radio and Voice of America (VOA). He wrote more than 30 books in Bangla and English on national and international politics, defense strategy, election and history based travel books etc.

His first book dealt with politico-military events of Bangladesh between 1975 and 1981 named Bangladesh Roktakto Oddhay 1975-81 published by Palok Publishers. In this book, he describes the tense situation of that day, the pent-up anger of the army, the reasons, the impact on the public mind, the global reaction and the expected results. Besides, he shared his experience of being the election commissioner in Bangladesh Election Commission in a book named Nirbachon Commissione Paanch Bochor (2007-2012). Other writings are Gonotontro o Nirbachon, Bangladesh Nirbachon O Nirbachoni Songskar, Nirbachoni Byabosthapona, Electoral Reform in Bangladesh 1972-2008.

He travelled to many historical places in the world and noted some travel books such as Koto Jonopod Koto Itihas, Iran Jemon Dekhlam, Paris theke Vienna, Mohenjo-Daro hote Karakoram, Andaman Hoye Venice, Jordan Nodi Tote, Bangla Bihar Prantore, Russiar Dui Shohore, Anatolia Hote Andalusia, Murshidabad Hoye Goure etc.

As a columnist, he shared views fairly through writing on issues of security and geo-politics and wrote several books like Dokkhin Asia o Bangladesher Nirapotta, Moddhyopracchyo Songhat: Bortoman o Vobisshyot, South Asian Tangle, Antorjatik Sontrasher Itikotha: Afghanistan Hote America, Osthir Bisshyo o Amader Rajneeti, Terrorism in South Asia, Regional Conflicts: Impact on Global peace, Tel-Gas: Nobbyo Uponibeshbad (Kabul Hote Bagdad), Sontrash: Dokkhin Asia o Moddhyoprachyo, Amar Nirbachito Songkolon, Amar Nirbachito Column etc. He expressed his opinion on Rohingyas in Burmar Rohingyara Gonohottyar Itihas.

He wrote a novel as well based on a true incidence and named Dui Bhubone.
