= Ahsan Habib Khan =

Election Commissioner of Bangladesh

Election Commissioner of Bangladesh
- In office 26 February 2022 – 5 September 2024
- President: Abdul Hamid; Mohammed Shahabuddin
- Prime Minister: Sheikh Hasina; Muhammad Yunus (acting)
- Preceded by: Shahadat Hossain Chowdhury
- Succeeded by: Abul Fazal Sanaullah

Personal details
- Education: Bangladesh Military Academy; MCTE; Defence Services Command and Staff College

Military service
- Allegiance: Bangladesh
- Branch/service: Bangladesh Army
- Years of service: 1980-2013
- Rank: Brigadier General
- Unit: Corps of Signals
- Commands: Director General of BNCC; Commander of 86th Independent Signals Brigade; Deputy Director General of BTRC; Station Commander, Chittagong

Ahsan Habib Khan is a Bangladeshi retired Bangladesh Army brigadier general and former Election Commissioner of Bangladesh. After retiring from the army, he served as vice-chairman of the Bangladesh Telecommunication Regulatory Commission (BTRC).

== Career ==
Khan retired from the Bangladesh Army in 2013 with the rank of brigadier general. During his military career, he served as the director general of the Spectrum Division of the Bangladesh Telecommunication Regulatory Commission.

From 2014 to 2017, Khan was the vice-chairperson of the Bangladesh Telecommunication Regulatory Commission. During his tenure the Bangladesh Telecommunication Regulatory Commission cracked down on usage of illegally imported cell phones.

The Bangladesh Tariqat Federation proposed Khan's name to the selection committee for the Election Commission. On 26 February 2022, Khan was appointed an election commissioner.

Khan also served as director general of the Bangladesh National Cadet Corps (BNCC) from 2 January 2005 to 30 September 2007.
