= Rashida Sultana Emily =

Election Commissioner of Bangladesh

Election Commissioner of Bangladesh
- In office 26 February 2022 – 5 September 2024
- President: Abdul Hamid
- Prime Minister: Sheikh Hasina
- Succeeded by: Abdur Rahmanel Masud

Rashida Sultana Emily is a Bangladeshi retired District and Sessions judge and former Election Commissioners of Bangladesh.

== Early life ==
Emily was born in Sirajganj District.

== Career ==
Emily joined the judicial service of Bangladesh Civil Service in 1985.

Emily retired in 2020 as the Rangpur District judge. She had previously served in Gaibandha District.

On 26 February 2022, Emily was appointed an Election Commissioner of Bangladesh.
