= Mohammad Abdur Rouf =

Bangladeshi jurist and civil servant (1934–2025)

- মোহাম্মদ আবদুর রউফ
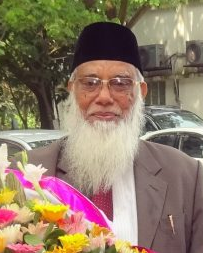
- Rouf in 2019

5th Chief Election Commissioner of Bangladesh
- In office 25 December 1990 – 18 April 1995
- President: Shahabuddin Ahmed; Abdur Rahman Biswas
- Prime Minister: Khaleda Zia
- Preceded by: Sultan Hossain Khan
- Succeeded by: A. K. M. Sadeq

Personal details
- Born: 1 February 1934 Mymensingh, Bengal Presidency, British India
- Died: 9 February 2025 (aged 91) Dhaka, Bangladesh

Mohammad Abdur Rouf (1 February 1934 – 9 February 2025) was a Bangladeshi jurist and civil servant who was a justice of the Bangladesh Supreme Court. He started as a practising advocate and then became an additional judge of the High Court Division. He was then raised to Appellate Division of the court, and was later appointed Chief Election Commissioner by the President of Bangladesh. He was a Shariah adviser to Fareast Islami Life Insurance Company Limited and Prime Islami Life Insurance. Abdur Rouf also served as the president of the national children's organization, Phulkuri Ashar.

== Early life ==
Abdur Rouf was born on 1 February 1934 in the district of Mymensingh. His ancestral home was in Dapunia village of the Mymensingh Sadar Upazila. He received a scholarship for primary and secondary education and matriculated with distinction in 1951 from Mymensingh Zilla School, obtained I. S. C. and B. Sc. degrees from Ananda Mohan College; obtained B. Ed. and M. A. in Education degrees from Mymensingh Teachers Training College with a government scholarship, and obtained M. A. and L. L. B. degrees in International Relations from Dhaka University.

== Career ==
Abdur Rouf was a practising advocate of Bangladesh Supreme Court and was elevated to the bench of the High Court Division as an additional judge on 29 January 1982 and confirmed on 26 January 1984. He was elevated to the Appellate Division of the Supreme Court on 8 June 1995. While in the post of Justice in the High Court Division, he was appointed the chief election commissioner on 25 December 1990 by the President of Bangladesh Justice Sahabuddin Ahmed, replacing Justice Sultan Hossain Khan. On 18 April 1995, he left the chief election commission post and was replaced by Justice A. K. M. Sadeq.

Later Abdur Rouf returned to the post of justice, elevated to the Appellate Division and retired on 1 February 1999.

Abdur Rouf held positions in many non-profit social welfare organizations. He served as the chairman of the board of trustees of Hamdard Laboratories (WAQF) Bangladesh from 2001 to 2009. He founded Insaf Barakah Hospital and was the founding chairman of the Barakah Foundation. He was appointed the President of the Board of Advisers of Phulkuri Ashar.

== Death ==
Abdur Rouf died in Dhaka on 9 February 2025, at the age of 91. He had been receiving treatment at Insaf Barakah Kidney and General Hospital.
