= M. A. Aziz (commissioner) =

Bangladeshi Judge

- এম. এ. আজিজ

9th Chief Election Commissioner of Bangladesh
- In office 23 May 2005 – 21 January 2007
- President: Iajuddin Ahmed
- Prime Minister: Khaleda Zia; Iajuddin Ahmed; Fazlul Haque; Fakhruddin Ahmed
- Preceded by: MA Syed
- Succeeded by: A. T. M. Shamsul Huda

Personal details
- Born: 30 September 1939 (age 86) Agailjhara, Barisal, Bengal Province, British India
- Education: University of Dhaka

M. A. Aziz (born 30 September 1939) is a former judge the Appellate Division of the Supreme Court of Bangladesh and former Chief Election Commissioner of Bangladesh.

== Early life ==
Aziz was born on 30 September 1939 in Amboula, Agailjhara Upazila, Barisal District, East Bengal, British India. He completed Matriculation in 1956, and in 1958 completed his Higher Secondary Certificate. He finished his bachelor's degree in history at the University of Dhaka in 1961 and Masters in 1962. In 1969, he was called to bar at law at the Honourable Society of the Inner Temple in London, United Kingdom. He started his practice at the High Court.

== Career ==
In 1986, Aziz became a judge at the High Court Division in June 1996.

In January 2003, Aziz and justice Nazrul Islam Chowdhury declared the detention of Tofail Ahmed, a politician of the Awami League, who was arrested in December 2002.

On 7 January 2004, Aziz was promoted to the Appellate Division of the Bangladesh Supreme Court. This was controversial as his promotion superseded Judge Syed Amirul Islam.

On 22 May 2005, Aziz was appointed chief election commissioner of Bangladesh overseeing the Bangladesh Election Commission. There were street protests demanding his resignation as opposition parties did not believe he would be neutral during the election.

Aziz resigned from the post of chief election commissioner following political unrest in Bangladesh and the Bangladesh Awami League not accepting his position. The creation of the voter list during his term was marred in controversy as it faced accusation of being partisan and corruption. He met chairperson of Bangladesh Nationalist Party, Khaleda Zia, in 2008 which the media speculated was for seeking a nomination from the party. ATM Shamsul Huda replaced him as the next chief election commissioner.

== See also ==
- Md. Saiful Alam (judge)
