= Mahbub Talukdar =

Bangladeshi poet and civil servant (1942–2022)

- মাহবুব তালুকদার
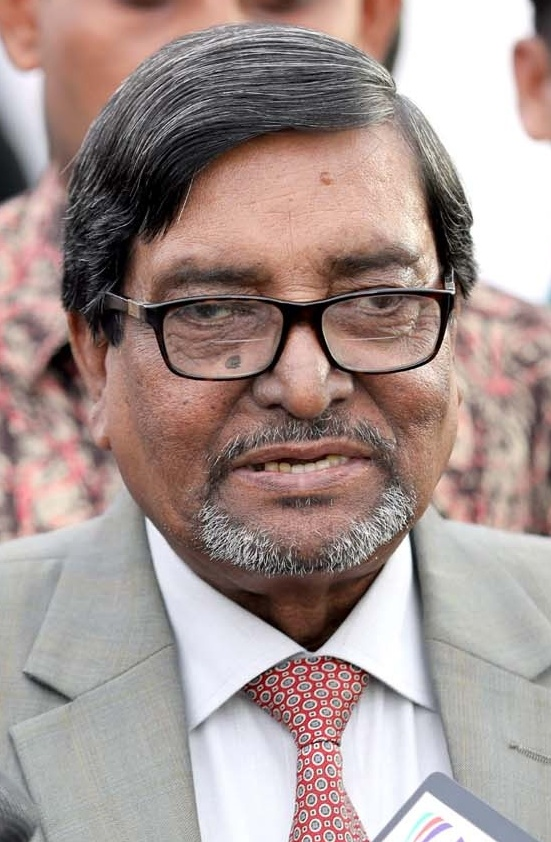
- Talukdar in 2018

Election Commissioner of Bangladesh
- In office 15 February 2017 – 14 February 2022
- President: Abdul Hamid
- Chief Election Commissioner: KM Nurul Huda

Personal details
- Born: 13 February 1942 Purbadhala Upazila, Bengal Presidency, British India
- Died: 24 August 2022 (aged 80)
- Education: University of Dhaka
- Known for: Poet, writer, former election commissioner
- Awards: Bangla Academy Literary Award (2012)

Mahbub Talukdar (13 February 1942 – 24 August 2022) was a Bangladeshi poet, writer, civil servant, and one of the Election Commissioners of Bangladesh. He was awarded Bangla Academy Literary Award in 2012 for his contribution in juvenile literature. He was a Freedom Fighter and joined the exiled government in 1971.

== Early life ==
Talukdar was born on 13 February 1942 at Purbadhala Upazila in Netrokona District of the then British Raj. He completed his Secondary School Certificate from Nawabpur Government High School and Higher Secondary School Certificate from Dhaka College. He obtained his graduation and post graduation degree from the University of Dhaka in Bengali language and literature.

== Career ==
Talukdar started his career as teacher at University of Chittagong where he taught Bengali language and literature from 1968 to 1970. In 1971, he participated in the Bangladesh Liberation War and worked in the Ministry of Information under Provisional Government of Bangladesh. Later, he worked at Bangabhaban in various positions for five years.

On 24 January 1972, Talukdar was appointed the special officer for President Abu Sayeed Chowdhury. Then he worked as the public relations officer for President Mohammad Mohammadullah. He was the assistant press secretary and speech writer during the presidency of Sheikh Mujibur Rahman. He also served as the director general of Shilpakala Academy. He retired from government service in 1999.

On 15 February 2017, Mahbub Talukdar was appointed a member of the Bangladesh Election Commission by the President of Bangladesh Abdul Hamid. The commission consisted of five members and was headed by KM Nurul Huda.

== Personal life ==
Talukdar was married to Nilufar Begum. The couple had two daughters and a son.
