= Md. Alamgir =

Election Commissioner of Bangladesh

- মো. আলমগীর

Election Commissioner of Bangladesh
- In office 26 February 2022 – 5 September 2024
- President: Abdul Hamid
- Prime Minister: Sheikh Hasina
- Succeeded by: Tahmida Ahmed

Md. Alamgir is a Bangladeshi former civil servant and former election commissioner of Bangladesh. He was a former Senior Secretary of the Government of Bangladesh.

== Early life ==
Alamgir was born in Manikganj District. He has a degree in economics from the University of Dhaka.

== Career ==
Alamgir joined the admin branch of the Bangladesh Civil Service in 1986.

In May 2019, Alamgir was made the secretary of the Election Commission.

Alamgir retired on 3 February 2021 and was replaced M Humayun Kabir Khandaker as secretary of the Election Commission.

On 26 February 2022, Alamgir was appointed an Election Commissioner of Bangladesh.
