= A. K. M. Sadeq =

6th Chief Election Commissioner of Bangladesh

AKM Sadeq

6th Chief Election Commissioner of Bangladesh
- In office 27 April 1995 – 6 April 1996
- President: Abdur Rahman Biswas; Shahabuddin Ahmed
- Prime Minister: Khaleda Zia; Muhammad Habibur Rahman
- Preceded by: Abdur Rouf
- Succeeded by: Mohammad Abu Hena

Personal details
- Born: 10 August 1928 Muradnagar, Comilla, British Raj
- Died: 15 June 2016 (aged 87) United Hospital, Dhaka
- Parents: Abu Musa Ahmed (father); Naima Begum (mother)
- Education: University of Dhaka; Dhaka College

AKM Sadeq (10 August 1928 – 15 June 2016) was a Bangladeshi judge who was a judge of the Bangladesh Supreme Court and the sixth Chief Election Commissioner of Bangladesh.

== Career ==
AKM Sadeq taught Economics and Law at University of Dhaka. After practicing law for four years, he passed the Judicial BCS and started his government service as a munsef. He then worked at the Pakistan Supreme Court in Lahore as an Assistant Registrar. After becoming Bangladesh, he served as the District Judge of Tangail. Prior to his retirement, he served as a Judge of the High Court Division.

He was appointed Chief Election Commissioner of Bangladesh on 26 April 1995 and served till 6 April 1996. The disputed election of 15 February 1996 was held under his commission. He was also a member of the Law Commission.

== Death ==
AKM Sadeq died on 15 June 2016 while undergoing treatment at United Hospital in Dhaka.
