= M. Idris =

1st Chief Election Commissioner of Bangladesh

1st Chief Election Commissioner of Bangladesh
- In office 7 July 1972 – 7 July 1977
- President: Abu Sayeed Chowdhury; Mohammad Mohammadullah; Sheikh Mujibur Rahman; Khondaker Mostaq Ahmad; Abu Sadat Mohammad Sayem; Ziaur Rahman
- Prime Minister: Sheikh Mujibur Rahman; Muhammad Mansur Ali
- Preceded by: Post established
- Succeeded by: A. K. M. Nurul Islam

M. Idris Judge of the High Court of Bangladesh who was the first Chief Election Commissioner of Bangladesh.

== Career ==
Idris was appointed the Chief Election Commissioner of Bangladesh on 7 July 1972 and served until 6 July 1977. The first general election of 7 March 1972 was held under his commission.
