= Mohammad Abu Hena =

Bangladeshi diplomat, election commissioner, scout

- মোহাম্মদ আবু হেনা

7th Chief Election Commissioner of Bangladesh
- In office 9 April 1996 – 8 May 2000
- President: Abdur Rahman Biswas; Shahabuddin Ahmed
- Prime Minister: Mohammad Habibur Rahman; Sheikh Hasina
- Preceded by: A. K. M. Sadeq
- Succeeded by: MA Syed

Ambassador of Bangladesh to the Philippines
- In office 21 July 1992 – 27 December 1993
- Preceded by: Abdul Manaf
- Succeeded by: Reazul Hossain

Ambassador of Bangladesh to Japan
- In office 5 April 1991 – 14 July 1992
- Preceded by: A.K.M. Headaytul Huq
- Succeeded by: Mahbubul Huq

Personal details
- Born: 1937 (age 88–89) Rajbari, Bengal Province, British India
- Parents: Amanat Ali Mallick (father); Begum Shasunnahar (mother)
- Awards: Bronze Wolf Award

Mohammad Abu Hena (born 1937) is a former Bangladeshi diplomat, election commissioner and scout. He served as the seventh Chief Election Commissioner of Bangladesh during 1996–2000. He was as an ambassador of Bangladesh to Japan and the Philippines. He was as the international commissioner of the Bangladesh Scouts, as well as the chairman of the Asia-Pacific Scout Region.

== Early life ==
Muhamad Abu Hena was born in 1937 in the village of Bahadurpur, Pangshar, Rajbari in the then British India to Amanat Ali Mallick and Begum Shasunnahar. Hena completed his master's in English Language and Literature in 1959 from the University of Dhaka.

== Career ==
Hena started his career as a college lecturer and later became a faculty member at the University of Dhaka.

Hena joined the then Pakistan Civil Service (CSP) in 1963. He was appointed the Chief Election Commissioner on 9 April 1996 and resigned on 8 May 2000 citing health reasons. The seventh Bangladesh parliamentary election of 12 June 1996 was held under his commission.

In 1978, Hena became the international commissioner of Bangladesh Scouts. He was then elected member of the Asia-Pacific Scout Region Committee in 1984 and then elected chairman for a 3-year term.

From 5 April 1991 to 14 July 1992, Hena served as the ambassador of Bangladesh to Japan. Then he was an ambassador to Philippines from 21 July 1992 until 27 December 1993.

In 1994, Hena was awarded the 232nd Bronze Wolf Award, the only distinction of the World Organization of the Scout Movement, by the World Scout Committee for exceptional services to world scouting. He attended 2008 World Scouts Day in Dhaka.

In 2007, Hena was appointed as the ombudsperson of BRAC, one of the world's largest NGOs, for a three-year term.
