= ASA University Bangladesh =

Coordinates: 23.7738°N 90.3663°E

- Other names: ASAUB
- Type: Private
- Established: 2006; 20 years ago
- Affiliations: Government & University Grants Commission
- Chancellor: President Mohammed Shahabuddin
- Vice-Chancellor: Dr. S.M. Rezaul Karim
- Students: 4,000 (above)
- Location: Dhaka, Bangladesh
- Campus: Urban
- Website: www.asaub.edu.bd

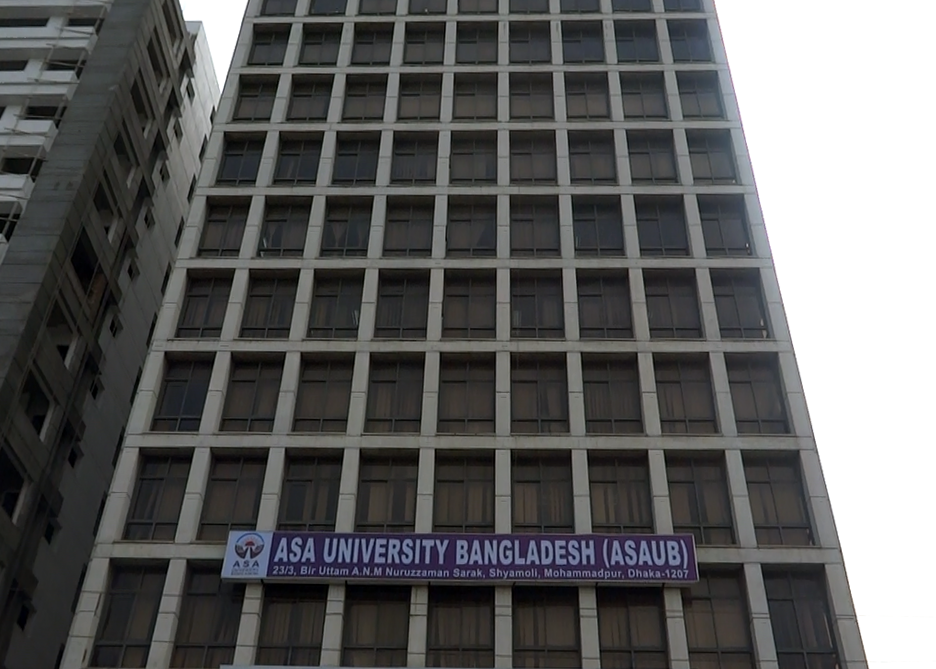
ASA University Bangladesh Campus

ASA University Bangladesh (Bengali: আশা বিশ্ববিদ্যালয় বাংলাদেশ, ASAUB) is a private university in Shyamoli, Dhaka, Bangladesh. The university was established under the Private University Act 1992. ASAUB is affiliated by the University Grants Commission Bangladesh. Md. Muinuddin Khan (widely known as M. M. Khan) was the premier vice-chancellor of ASAUB, and he held the position for five years. Then Vice-Chancellor permit of ASAUB is Dalem Chandra Barman. He held his position for 4 years.After this, Iqbal Hossain Chowdhury was appointed as the acting Vice Chancellor in 2015, but in 2024, he was forced to resign in the face of protests from the Pharmacy Department and the Law Department.

== Graduate programs ==
- MBA, majors in finance, marketing, accounting, management, HRM, MIS
- LLM
- MPH
- MA in English, final and preliminary
- B Pharm
- BBA
- B.A (Hon's) in English
- B.S.S (Hon's) in Applied Sociology
- L.L.B. (Hon)

== Faculty of Science & Engineering ==
- B.Pharm.
- MPH

== Faculty heads ==
- Md. Saiful Alam, Dean, Faculty of Law
- Azizar Rahman Khan Dean, Faculty of Business
- Abu Daud Hassan, Dean, Faculty of Arts & Social Sciences
- Kohinur Begum, Dean, Faculty of Science

== List of vice-chancellors ==
- Nurol Islam Nazem.

== Admission eligibility ==
Students who have passed SSC and HSC or equivalent examinations with at least two second divisions or minimum GPA 2.5 in each (in the scale of 5.00) may apply for admission. For A level students, at least five subjects in O level with minimum GPA 2.5 and two subjects in A level with minimum GPA 2.5 (A=5, B=4, C=3, D=2, E=1 [only one E is acceptable]) are required.

== Co-curricular activities ==
ASA University is a great source of co-curricular activities. Many clubs and associations play a fundamental role in developing student creativity and personal skills. Every department has some clubs which are run by the students with the help of teachers. There are about four clubs in the Faculty of the Department of Business Administration, nine clubs in the Faculty of Law, and one club (English Club) in the Department of English. These clubs arrange and organize cultural programs, seminars, conferences, workshops, competitions, social activities, etc.

== Publications ==
The Faculty of Law publishes Student's Law Review (very first magazine of ASAUB). It publishes every semester by the initiative of the students of law with the help of teachers. Khaled Saifullah (Editor) and Mahbubur Rahman Nazmi (Asst. Editor) are the initiators of this journal. A business magazine Synergy is publishes from the Department of Business Administration. The Department of English has some wall magazines. Scribble and "Scudding Drifts" are the updated ones in association with the English Club. English Club also efforts on publishing a yearly magazine titled "Symphony" from the Department of English designed with the creative writings of the respective students and teachers.
