= Md Anwarul Islam Sarker =

Md. Anwarul Islam Sarker
- মোঃ আনোয়ারুল ইসলাম সরকার
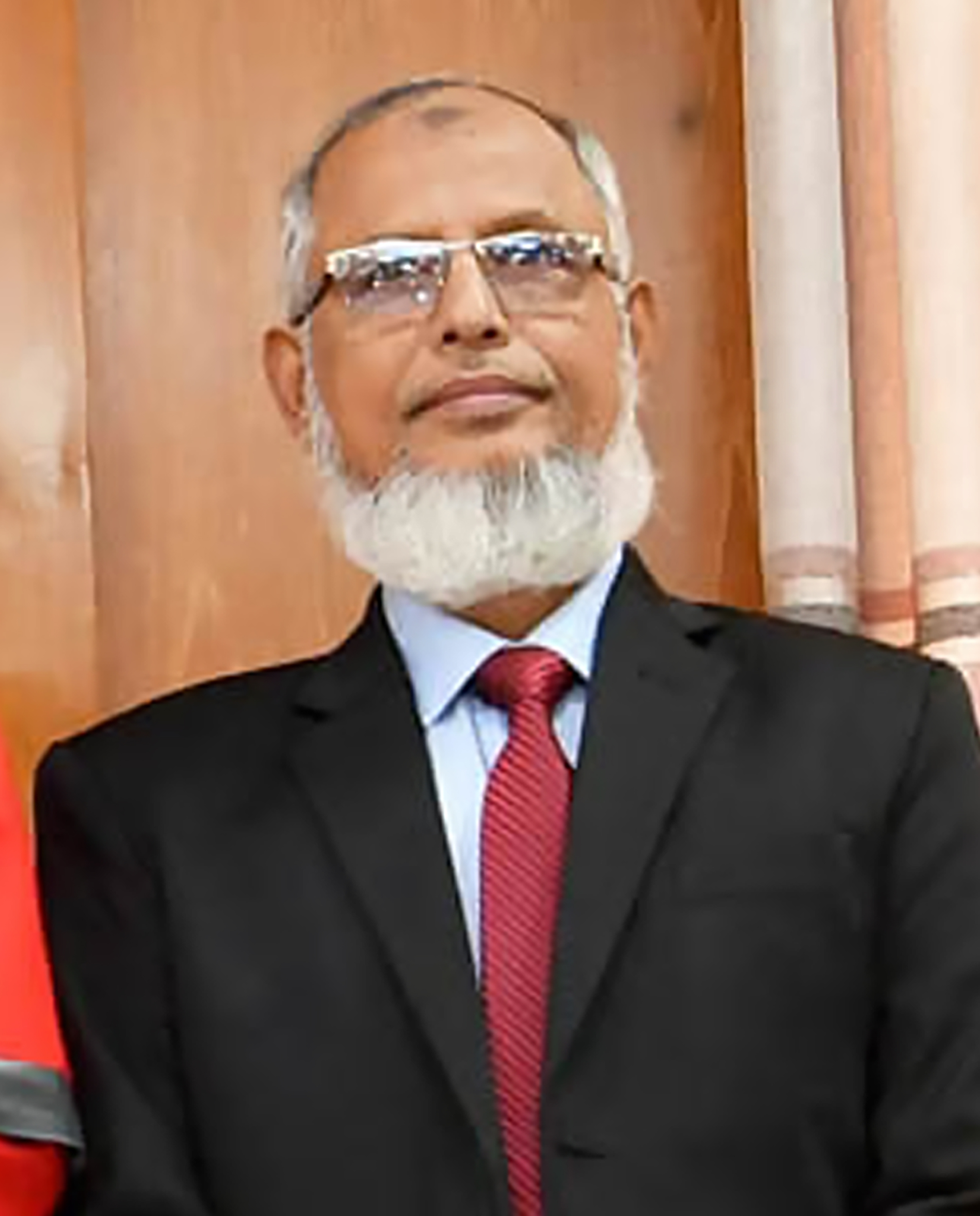
- Sarker in 2024

Election Commissioner of Bangladesh
- Incumbent
- Assumed office 22 November 2024 Serving with Abdur Rahmanel Masud, Tahmida Ahmed, Abul Fazal Md Sanaullah
- President: Mohammed Shahabuddin; Hafiz Uddin Ahmad (acting); Mirza Fakhrul Islam Alamgir
- Prime Minister: Muhammad Yunus (acting); Tarique Rahman
- Preceded by: Anisur Rahman

Personal details
- Born: 31 December 1962 (age 63) East Pakistan
- Spouse: Naima Akter
- Education: University of Dhaka
- Profession: Civil Servant

Md Anwarul Islam Sarker (born 31 December 1962) is a Bangladeshi former civil servant. He was appointed as Election Commissioner of Bangladesh by the President of Bangladesh on 21 November 2024 and assumed office on 24 November 2024 after taking the oath.

== Early life and education ==
Sarker was born on 31 December 1962 in Rupganj, Narayanganj District. His father was the late Nurul Islam and his mother was the late Saleha Khatun. He obtained his master’s degree in Accounting from the University of Dhaka in 1985.

== Career ==
After passing the 7th Bangladesh Civil Service (BCS) examination, Sarker joined government service. On 15 February 1988, he began his career as an Assistant Commissioner at the Office of the Divisional Commissioner in Chattogram. In his long and distinguished public service career, Sarker served in various significant positions, including: Assistant Commissioner, Cox’s Bazar District, Upazila Magistrate, Bancharampur and Sadar Upazilas, Brahmanbaria District, Revenue Deputy Collector (RDC), Habiganj District, Upazila Nirbahi Officer (UNO), Barkal Upazila, Rangamati District, UNO, Bancharampur Upazila, Brahmanbaria District, UNO, Kaliakair Upazila, Gazipur District, Additional Deputy Commissioner/Magistrate, Gazipur District and Deputy Commissioner, Rajshahi District. He also served in various ministries and departments, including: Assistant Director, Bureau of Non-Formal Education (under the Ministry of Primary and Mass Education), Director, National Housing Authority (under the Ministry of Housing and Public Works), Deputy Secretary and Joint Secretary, Ministry of Youth and Sports, Joint Secretary and Additional Secretary, Ministry of Public Administration, Additional Secretary, Ministry of Youth and Sports . He retired from the Bangladesh Civil Service as an additional secretary.

Following the fall of the Sheikh Hasina led Awami League government, Sarker was appointed Commissioner of the Bangladesh Election Commission by the Muhammad Yunus led interim government in November 2024.

== Personal life ==
Sarker is married to Naima Akter, a homemaker. The couple has three daughters.
