= Election Commission Secretariat =

Administrative secretariat of the Bangladesh Election Commission

- নির্বাচন কমিশন সচিবালয়
- Logo of Bangladesh Election Commission

Agency overview
- Formed: 9 March 2008
- Jurisdiction: Bangladesh Election Commission
- Headquarters: Nirbachon Bhaban, Agargaon
- Agency executive: Akhter Ahmed, Senior Secretary
- Parent agency: Bangladesh Election Commission
- Website: https://ecs.gov.bd/en/page/election-commission-secretariat

Election Commission Secretariat (Bengali: নির্বাচন কমিশন সচিবালয়), is the permanent administrative body that carries out the executive and logistical work of the Election Commission of Bangladesh. It was constituted as an independent secretariat, separate from the general civil administration, under the Election Commission Secretariat Act, 2009, enacted to give effect to Article 118(4) of the Constitution of Bangladesh. The Secretariat is headed by a Secretary and is headquartered at Nirbachon Bhaban, Agargaon, in Dhaka.

== History ==
Calls to free the Commission's secretariat from executive control date to the early 1990s and grew stronger after the 2006 electoral-roll controversy, when the voter list was widely alleged to have been inflated to favor the then ruling party. The non-party caretaker government led by Fakhruddin Ahmed responded with an ordinance in March 2008, which Jatiya Sangsad later converted into the Election Commission Secretariat Act on 24 January 2009, applied retrospectively to the ordinance's date of issue. Where the Secretariat's staff had previously been widely regarded as an extension of the government bureaucracy, the Act instead placed personnel, financial and disciplinary authority over the Secretariat under the Chief Election Commissioner.

== Organization ==
Below its Dhaka head office, the Secretariat runs a field administration of ten regional election offices at the seven divisional headquarters and three other districts, 83 senior/district election offices across 64 district headquarters, and a network of upazila/thana election offices at the sub-district level, alongside an Electoral Training Institute for election officials. The regional offices maintain liaison between the Secretariat and subordinate field-level offices and coordinate the conduct of elections, new voter registrations, and the periodic updating, amendment and correction of electoral rolls. District Election Officers, who head the district offices, handle voter registration, printing of voter lists, the conduct of national and local elections, training of polling personnel and logistical arrangements, and assist Returning Officers and polling staff with forms, manuals, ballot boxes, electoral rolls and ballot papers, while maintaining accounts of election-related expenses. Upazila/thana election officers, at the base of the field structure, assist the divisional and district offices in carrying out these functions.

== Functions ==
The Secretariat assists the Commission with preparing and updating electoral rolls, delimiting constituencies, conducting presidential, parliamentary and local-government elections and referendums, allocating party and candidate symbols, appointing and training polling staff, procuring and distributing ballot papers, ballot boxes and indelible ink, compiling and gazetting election results, and constituting election tribunals to hear election disputes.

== See also ==
- Bangladesh Election Commission
- Chief Election Commissioner of Bangladesh
