= Mohammad Abu Hafiz =

Bangladeshi election commissioner

Mohammad Abu Hafiz is a Bangladeshi civil servant and election commissioner of Bangladesh from 2012 to 2017.

== Career ==
Hafiz retired as an additional secretary from the Bangladesh Civil Service.

In February 2012, he was appointed an election commissioner by President Zillur Rahman as part of a five-member commission led by Chief Election Commissioner Kazi Rakibuddin Ahmad. The commission was formed following recommendations from a search committee and was tasked with overseeing national and local elections, including the parliamentary election scheduled for 2014. In September 2013, Hafiz stated that it would be challenging for the Election Commission to conduct a general election if parliament remained in place, noting concerns about ensuring a level playing field for all candidates. In March 2014, Hafiz stated that the Election Commission had completed preparations for the Tangail-8 by-election and expressed confidence that the vote would be free and fair. He also stated that violence during elections is normal. In August 2014, Hafiz stated that the Election Commission could not take action on allegations of threatening a police officer against Member of Parliament Shamim Osman due to an incomplete inquiry report. Osman had been accused of threatening Superintendent of Police Muhammad Bashir Uddin over the Narayanganj-5 by-election, where his brother Selim Osman was a candidate.

Hafiz was part of the five-member Election Commission that oversaw thousands of elections, including the 2014 parliamentary election and various local government polls. The commission faced significant criticism from opposition parties and observers over its handling of elections, particularly the 2014 general election, which was boycotted by the Bangladesh Nationalist Party and resulted in many uncontested seats, as well as for violence surrounding local government polls. The commission would defend the election near the end of its term in 2017. The commissioners met Prime Minister Sheikh Hasina before their term ended and told her that they had worked impartially during their tenure.

After the fall of the Sheikh Hasina-led Awami League government, a travel ban was imposed on Haiz along with other former election commissioners. In June 2025, he was named in allegations submitted by the Bangladesh Nationalist Party to the Election Commission, which accused former commissioners of failing to act on complaints related to the 10th parliamentary election in 2014. The party called for legal action against those involved, citing concerns over the conduct of the polls.
