= Kazi Habibul Awal =

13th Chief Election Commissioner of Bangladesh

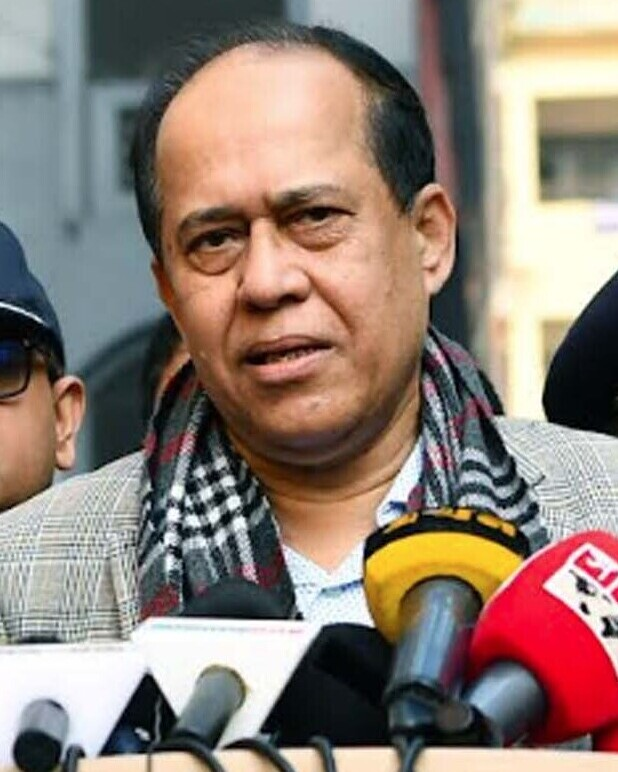

13th Chief Election Commissioner of Bangladesh
- In office 27 February 2022 – 5 September 2024
- President: Mohammad Abdul Hamid; Mohammed Shahabuddin
- Prime Minister: Sheikh Hasina
- Preceded by: KM Nurul Huda
- Succeeded by: AMM Nasir Uddin

Personal details
- Born: 21 January 1956 (age 70) Comilla District, East Pakistan
- Spouse: Sahana Akhter Khanam
- Children: 3 daughters
- Education: University of Dhaka; Dhaka College; Saint Joseph's High School, Khulna
- Profession: Judge, civil servant

Kazi Habibul Awal (born 21 January 1956) is a retired senior secretary and the former chief election commissioner of Bangladesh. He resigned as CEC on 5 September 2024.

== Early life and education ==
Habibul Awal was born on 21 January 1956 in Comilla District, East Pakistan, to a family from Sandwip Upazila. His father, Kazi Abdul Awal, was the deputy inspector general of prison, he was also the plaintiff in the Jail Killing case. He obtained his Bachelor of Laws and Master of Laws from Dhaka University in 1976 and 1978 respectively. His mother was Begum Nafisa Khatun.

== Career ==
Awal started his career as an assistant judge (munsif) in 1981 after passing the Bangladesh Civil Service exam. He was promoted to district and sessions judge in 1996.

Awal was the joint secretary of the Ministry of Law and Parliamentary Affairs in 2000, additional secretary in 2003 and secretary of the same ministry on 28 June 2007. On 5 July 2007, Judge Aftab Uddin Ahmed filed a petition against the appointment of Habibul Awal as acting secretary.

Following the appointment of Awal as additional secretary of the Legal and Drafting Branch of the Law Ministry, Justice Shah Abu Nayeem Mominur Rahman and Justice Shahidul Islam declared his appointment illegal in 2010. He also apologized for the incident when a parliamentary committee summoned him for illegally retiring two judges while he was the additional secretary of the Legal and Drafting Branch of the Law Ministry. Judicial officials, including a court judge, staged a protest demanding his removal, alleging that he was involved in various controversial activities, including denying the interests of judges and preventing the government from paying a separate salary-allowance to judges.

Awal was the secretary of the Ministry of Religious Affairs in 2010 and in 2013 was transferred to the Office of the President. Later he became the secretary of the Ministry of Defense in 2014. Promoted to senior secretary in the Ministry of Defense in December 2014. He retired in 2015 and got two contractual appointments till 2017.

From February 2022 till the fall of the Sheikh Hasina led Awami League government, Awal served as the chief election commissioner and oversaw the 12th parliamentary elections. In June 2025, he was detained by the Detective Branch following a case filed by the Bangladesh Nationalist Party.

== Personal life ==
Kazi Habibul Awal married Sahana Akhter Khanam. The couple have three daughters.
