= Abul Fazal Muhammad Sanaullah =

- আবুল ফজল মোঃ সানাউল্লাহ
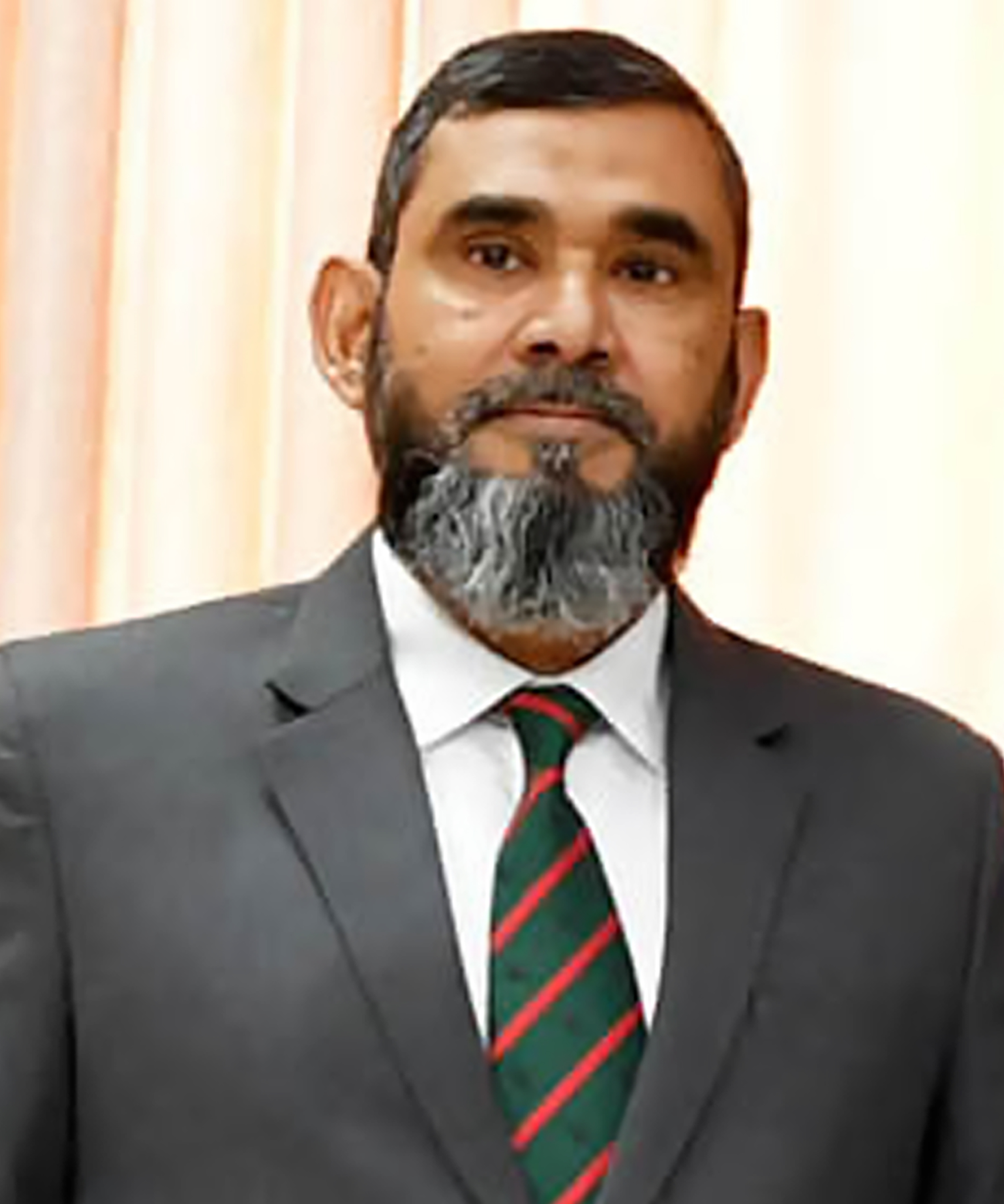
- Sanaullah in 2024

Election Commissioner of Bangladesh
- Incumbent
- Assumed office 22 November 2024 Serving with Md Anwarul Islam Sarker, Abdur Rahmanel Masud, Tahmida Ahmed
- President: Mohammed Shahabuddin; Hafiz Uddin Ahmad (acting); Mirza Fakhrul Islam Alamgir
- Prime Minister: Muhammad Yunus (acting); Tarique Rahman
- Preceded by: Ahsan Habib Khan

Personal details
- Born: 1 July 1968 (age 58) Nachole, East Pakistan, Pakistan
- Spouse: Shahida Chowdhury
- Education: Bangladesh Military Academy
- Profession: Military Officer civil servant
- Awards: Sword of Honour (BMA); Sena Utkorsho Padak(SUP)

Military service
- Allegiance: Bangladesh
- Branch/service: Bangladesh Army
- Years of service: 1988 - 2022
- Rank: Brigadier General<
- Unit: East Bengal Regiment
- Commands: Commander of 309th Infantry Brigade; Station Commander, Rangpur; Commandant of Bangladesh Infantry Regimental Centre; Director of CTIB
- Battles/wars: UNOSOM II

Abul Fazal Muhammad Sanaullah (born 1 July 1968) is a retired Bangladesh Army one-star officer and incumbent Election Commissioner of Bangladesh.

== Birth and education ==
He was born on 1 July 1968 in Nachole, Chapai Nawabganj District. He completed his primary education at Nachole Government Primary School, secondary education at Nachole Pilot High School, and higher secondary education at Nachole College. In July 1986, he joined the Bangladesh Military Academy as a cadet of the 18th BMA Long Course and was commissioned into the Infantry in June 1988. He was awarded the Sword of Honour by the president of Bangladesh for being the best all-round cadet in training.

Sanaullah holds three master's degrees: a Master's in Defence Studies from the National University of Bangladesh, a Master's in Military Arts and Science from the United States and a Master's in Management Studies from India.

== Career ==
Sanaullah achieved notable success in his professional and training career. He ranked first in the Army Staff Course, which qualified him for a second staff course in the United States. He also earned top results in the National Defence Course in Bangladesh. For securing first place in more than three military training programs, he was awarded the Sena Utkorsho Padak (SUP). He received commendations twice from the Chief of Army Staff for his command skills.

Alongside domestic training, Sanaullah received several international trainings in military science, geostrategy, and intelligence. In his 34 years of service, he held key positions, including commanding an infantry battalion and brigade, serving as Commandant of the Army Security Unit, and heading the Training Division of the Army Training and Doctrine Command. As a staff officer, he served as GSO-3 (Operations) of the 46 Independent Infantry Brigade, GSO-2 at the Military Operations Directorate, and Colonel General Staff at the Directorate General of Forces Intelligence (DGFI).

Sanaullah was a "Distinguished Instructor" and served as a tactics instructor and directing staff at the Defence Services Command and Staff College and the School of Infantry and Tactics. He also served in United Nations peacekeeping missions in Somalia (1994–1995) and the Democratic Republic of the Congo (2003–2004).

Before retirement, he served as the defence adviser at the Bangladesh High Commission in Islamabad and the Bangladesh Embassy in Tehran.

Sanaullah received the best gross award at the Bashundhara Cup Golf Tournament-2017 at Rangpur Golf Club at Rangpur Cantonment. He was the brigade commander of the 72nd Infantry Brigade of Rangpur Cantonment. He visited East West Media Group as part of a tour of the National Defence College.

Following the fall of the Sheikh Hasina led Awami League government, Sanaullah was appointed commissioner of the Bangladesh Election Commission.

== Personal life ==
Sanaullah is married to Shahida Chowdhury. The couple has one son and one daughter.
