= Abdur Rahmanel Masud =

- আবদুর রহমানেল মাছউদ
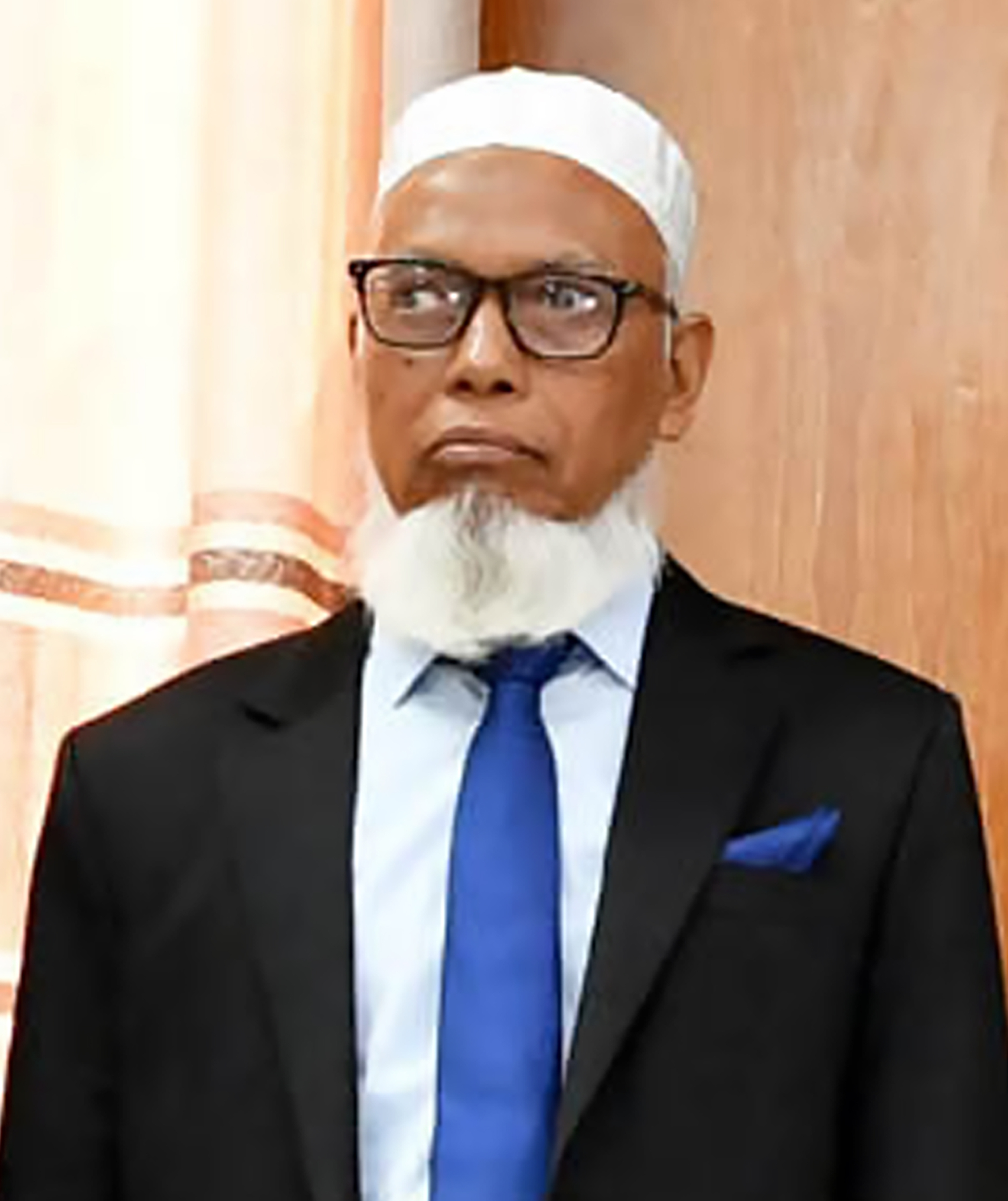
- Masud in 2024

Election Commissioner of Bangladesh
- Incumbent
- Assumed office 22 November 2024 Serving with Md Anwarul Islam Sarker, Tahmida Ahmed, Abul Fazal Md Sanaullah
- President: Mohammed Shahabuddin; Hafiz Uddin Ahmad (acting); Mirza Fakhrul Islam Alamgir
- Prime Minister: Muhammad Yunus (acting); Tarique Rahman
- Preceded by: Rashida Sultana Emily

Personal details
- Born: 1 January 1958 (age 68) East Pakistan
- Education: University of Dhaka
- Profession: Judge, Civil Servant

Abdur Rahmanel Masud (born 1 January 1958), also known as A.R. Masud, is a Bangladeshi retired District and Sessions judge and incumbent Election Commissioner of Bangladesh.

== Early life & Education ==
Masud was born on 1 January 1958 in Dhamrai Upazila, Dhaka District. His father late Maulana Ramzan Ali. He earned his LL.B. (Honors) in 1977 & LL.M. in 1978 degree from the University of Dhaka.

== Judicial career ==
Masud began his legal journey by enrolling as an Advocate in 1981 and subsequently as an Advocate in the Supreme Court of Bangladesh in 2019.

In 1983, Masud joined the judiciary as an Assistant Judge (Munsif) and steadily rose through the ranks. He served on deputation as the First Assistant Registrar and Deputy Registrar-1 in the High Court Division of the Bangladesh Supreme Court, contributing significantly to judicial administration. In 2000, he was promoted to the position of District Judge, serving in Chuadanga, Rajshahi, and Comilla.

From January 2004 to June 2007, he served as the Judge of Druto Bichar Tribunal-4, Dhaka, where he presided over fast-track criminal cases. Later, he became a Member of Administrative Tribunal-1, Dhaka, from November 2013 to December 2016, handling administrative and service-related legal matters.

Masud also worked as a part-time faculty member at a private university. Before joining the Election Commission, he served as the Chief Law Officer of Janata Bank PLC. Masud retired on 1 January 2017. After retiring from judicial service, he served as the Legal Advisor to the Islamic Foundation.

== Publications ==
Masud has authored 18 books on various legal subjects, including election law, anti-corruption law, land law, and criminal procedure.

== Personal life ==
He is married to a government college professor. The couple has one son, who is a banker, and one daughter, who is an engineer.
