= Sultan Hossain Khan =

Bangladeshi Judge

4th Chief Election Commissioner of Bangladesh
- In office 17 February 1990 – 24 December 1990
- President: Hussain Muhammad Ershad; Shahabuddin Ahmed
- Prime Minister: Kazi Zafar Ahmed
- Preceded by: Chowdhury A. T. M. Masud
- Succeeded by: Mohammad Abdur Rouf

1st Chairman of Anti-Corruption Commission
- In office 23 February 2004 – 8 February 2007
- Appointed by: Iajuddin Ahmed
- President: Iajuddin Ahmed
- Preceded by: position created
- Succeeded by: Hasan Mashhud Chowdhury

Personal details
- Died: 5 July 2015 Square Hospital, Dhaka, Bangladesh.

Sultan Hossain Khan (died 2015) was a Bangladeshi judge and the chief election commissioner of Bangladesh. He was the chairperson of the Anti-Corruption Commission and Bangladesh Press Council.

== Career ==
From 17 February 1990 to 24 December 1990, Khan served as the chief election commissioner of Bangladesh. He oversaw the first democratic election in Bangladesh after military dictator Hussain Mohammad Ershad was overthrown by a popular revolt in 1990. He led the investigation of the Logang massacre in 1992 in the Chittagong Hill Tracts.

Khan was appointed the first chairperson of the newly formed Anti-Corruption Commission in 2004. His appointment was challenged by Bangladesh Supreme Court lawyer Aminul Haque Helal in court. On 8 February 2007, Khan resigned following a request to do so by the president of Bangladesh, Iajuddin Ahmed.

Khan has served as the chairperson of Bangladesh Press Council.

== Death ==
Khan died at the age of 90 on 5 July 2015 at Square Hospital, Dhaka, Bangladesh.
