= Tahmida Ahmed =

Begum Tahmida Ahmed
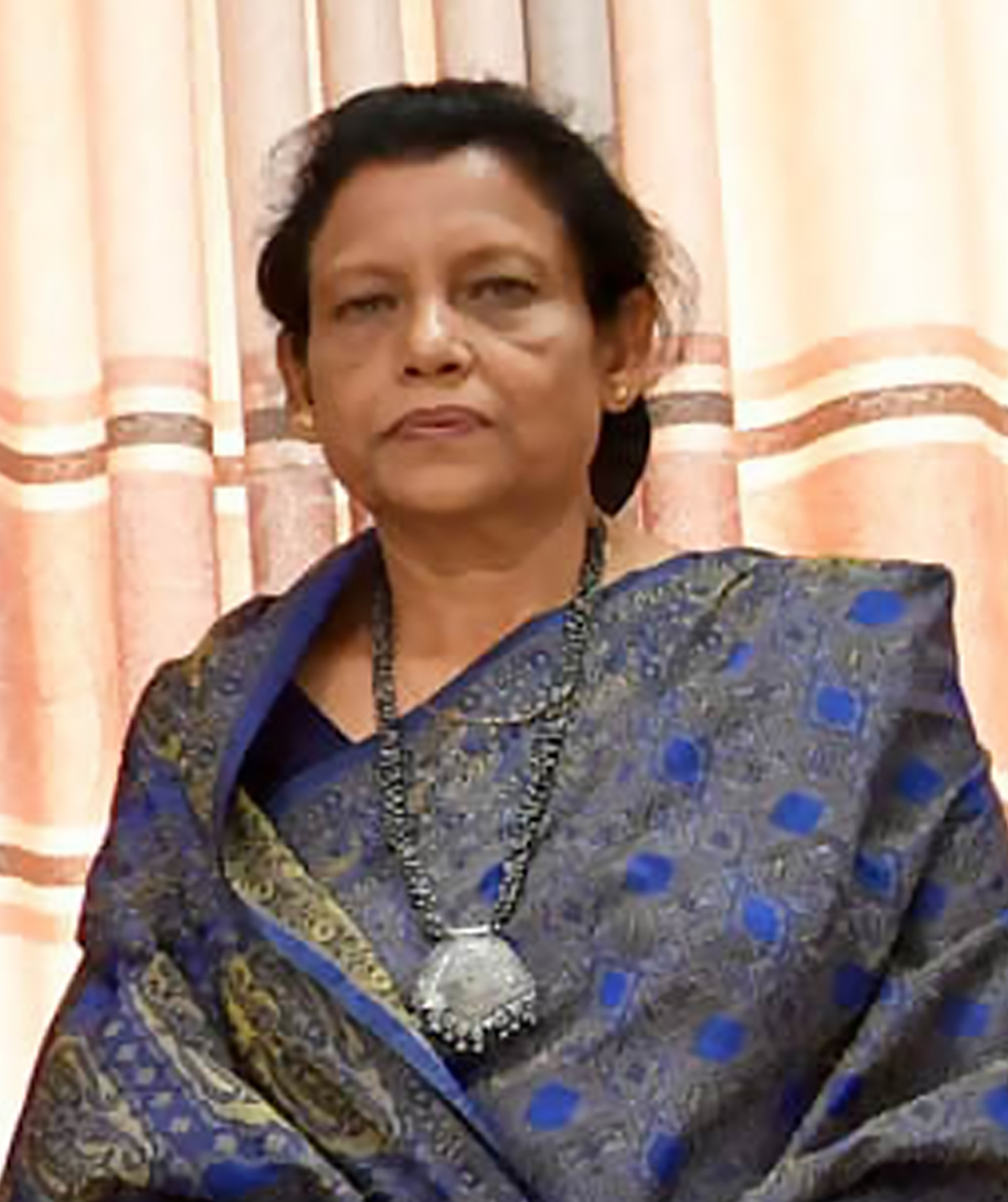
- Ahmed in 2024

Election Commissioner of Bangladesh
- Incumbent
- Assumed office 22 November 2024 Serving with Md Anwarul Islam Sarker, Abdur Rahmanel Masud, Abul Fazal Md Sanaullah
- President: Mohammed Shahabuddin; Hafiz Uddin Ahmad (acting); Mirza Fakhrul Islam Alamgir
- Prime Minister: Muhammad Yunus (acting); Tarique Rahman
- Preceded by: Md. Alamgir

Personal details
- Born: 30 October 1960 (age 65) Sunamganj District, East Pakistan
- Spouse: A.K.M. Ehsanul Haque
- Education: University of Dhaka
- Profession: Civil Servant

Begum Tahmida Ahmed (born 30 October 1960) is a Bangladeshi former civil servant. She was appointed election commissioner of Bangladesh position on 21 November 2024 and assumed office on 24 November 2024 after taking the oath.

== Early life and education ==
Ahmed was born on 30 October 1960 in Sadar Upazila, Sunamganj District. Her father was the late Ali Farid Ahmed and her mother was the late Arfa Ahmed. She earned her bachelor’s degree in Soil Science from University of Dhaka in 1985 and completed her master’s degree in the same subject from the same university in 1986.

== Career ==
Before joining the Bangladesh Civil Service (Administration) cadre, she worked for two years as an Assistant Soil Scientist at the Bangladesh Forest Research Institute in Chattogram. She joined the Bangladesh Civil Service (Administration) cadre on 1 April 1993 after passing the 11th BCS examination and served for 10 years in field administration as a Judicial Magistrate in Narsingdi, Kishoreganj, and Netrokona districts. From 2001, she worked in several ministries, including: Ministry of Agriculture, Ministry of Fisheries and Livestock, Ministry of Education and Ministry of Youth and Sports (as Senior Assistant Secretary).

As Deputy Secretary, she served in the Ministry of Industries and the Ministry of Expatriates’ Welfare and Overseas Employment. Later, as Joint Secretary, she served in the Ministry of Civil Aviation and Tourism. Her final posting before retirement was as Director of the Department of Jute under the Ministry of Textiles and Jute. She retired from government service on 29 October 2019. as a joint secretary.

Following the fall of the Sheikh Hasina led Awami League government, Ahmed was appointed an election commissioner of Bangladesh by the Muhammad Yunus led interim government in November 2024. She called for voting to take place in open fields for the sake of transparency.

== Personal life ==
Ahmed is married to A.K.M. Ehsanul Haque, an officer of the 11th batch of the Bangladesh Civil Service (Administration) cadre. The couple has one daughter.
