= Chief Election Commissioner of Bangladesh =

Government commissioner on elections

- বাংলাদেশের প্রধান নির্বাচন কমিশনার
- Bangladesh Election Commission logo

- Flag of chief election commissioner of Bangladesh

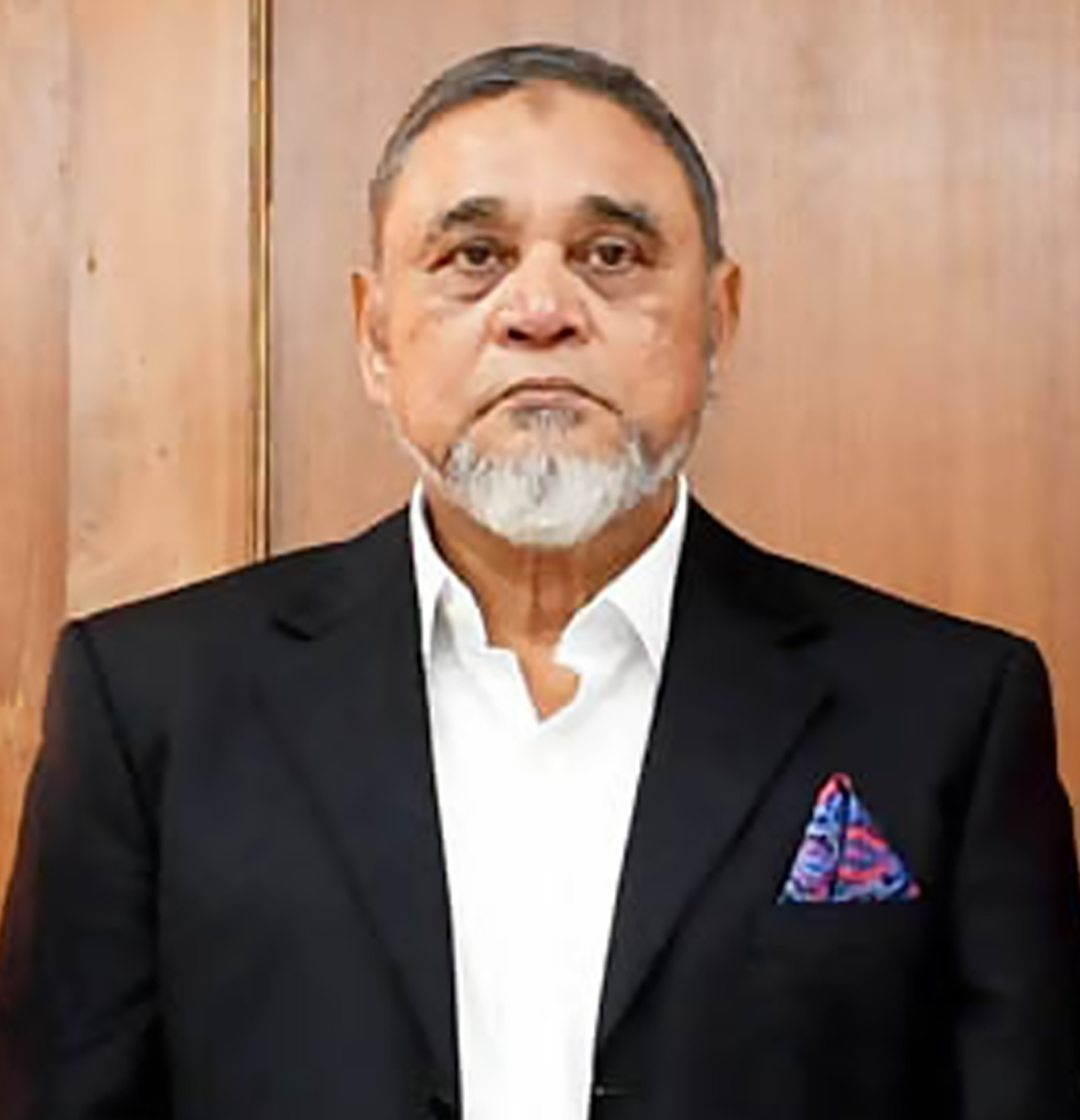
- Incumbent; AMM Nasir Uddin since 22 November 2024
- Bangladesh Election Commission
- Type: Chief Executive Officer
- Abbreviation: CEC
- Member of: Bangladesh Election Commission
- Reports to: President of Bangladesh
- Residence: Minto Road, Ramna, Dhaka
- Seat: Nirbachon Bhobon, Agargaon, Dhaka
- Appointer: President of Bangladesh
- Term length: Five years
- Inaugural holder: M. Idris
- Formation: 7 July 1972; 54 years ago
- Deputy: Election Commissioners
- Salary: ৳157500 (US$1,300) per month (incl. allowanced)
- Website: ecs.gov.bd

The chief election commissioner (CEC) (Bengali: বাংলাদেশের প্রধান নির্বাচন কমিশনার) heads the Election Commission of Bangladesh, a body constitutionally empowered to conduct free and fair elections.

== Appointment and removal ==
The appointment of the chief election commissioner of Bangladesh and other election commissioners (if any) is made by the president. Under the Constitution the term of office of any election commissioner is five years from the date on which he enters upon office. A person who has held office as chief election commissioner is not eligible for appointment in the service of the Republic. Any other election commissioner is, on ceasing to hold such office, eligible for appointment as chief election commissioner, but is not eligible for appointment in the service of the Republic.

== Duties and functions ==
In addition to their duties and functions as an election commissioner, the chief election commissioner acts as chairperson of the commission.

== List of chief election commissioners of Bangladesh ==
The following have held the post of the chief election commissioner of Bangladesh.

No.	Name (birth–death)	Image	Start of term	End of term	Length of term	Appointed by (President of Bangladesh)	Ref.
1	Justice M. Idris (? – ?)		7 July 1972	7 July 1977	5 years, 0 days	Abu Sayeed Chowdhury	
2	Justice A.K.M. Nurul Islam (1919 – 2015)		8 July 1977	17 February 1985	7 years, 194 days	Ziaur Rahman	
3	Justice Chowdhury A.T.M. Masud (1924 - 2013)		17 February 1985	17 February 1990	5 years, 0 days	Hussain Muhammad Ershad	
4	Justice Sultan Hossain Khan (1924 – 2015)		17 February 1990	24 December 1990	310 days	Hussain Muhammad Ershad	
5	Justice Mohammad Abdur Rouf (1934 – 2025)		25 December 1990	18 April 1995	4 years, 114 days	Shahabuddin Ahmed	
6	Justice A.K.M. Sadeq (1928 – 2016)		27 April 1995	6 April 1996	345 days	Abdur Rahman Biswas	
7	Mohammad Abu Hena (born 1937)		9 April 1996	8 May 2000	4 years, 29 days	Abdur Rahman Biswas	
8	M. A. Sayed (1937 – 2013)		23 May 2000	22 May 2005	4 years, 364 days	Shahabuddin Ahmed	
9	Justice M. A. Aziz (born 1939)		23 May 2005	21 January 2007	1 year, 243 days	Iajuddin Ahmed	
10	Dr. A. T. M. Shamsul Huda (1943 - 2025)		5 February 2007	5 February 2012	5 years, 0 days	Iajuddin Ahmed	
11	Kazi Rakibuddin Ahmed (born 1943)		9 February 2012	9 February 2017	5 years, 0 days	Zillur Rahman	
12	K. M. Nurul Huda (born 1948)		15 February 2017	17 February 2022	5 years, 2 days	Abdul Hamid	
13	Kazi Habibul Awal (born 1956)		27 February 2022	5 September 2024	2 years, 191 days	Abdul Hamid	
14	AMM Nasir Uddin (born 1953)		22 November 2024	Incumbent	1 year, 289 days	Mohammed Shahabuddin	

== See also ==
- Election Commission of Bangladesh
- Election Commissioner of Bangladesh
- Elections in Bangladesh
