= A. T. M. Shamsul Huda =

Bangladeshi civil servant (1943–2025)

- এ.টি.এম. শামসুল হুদা
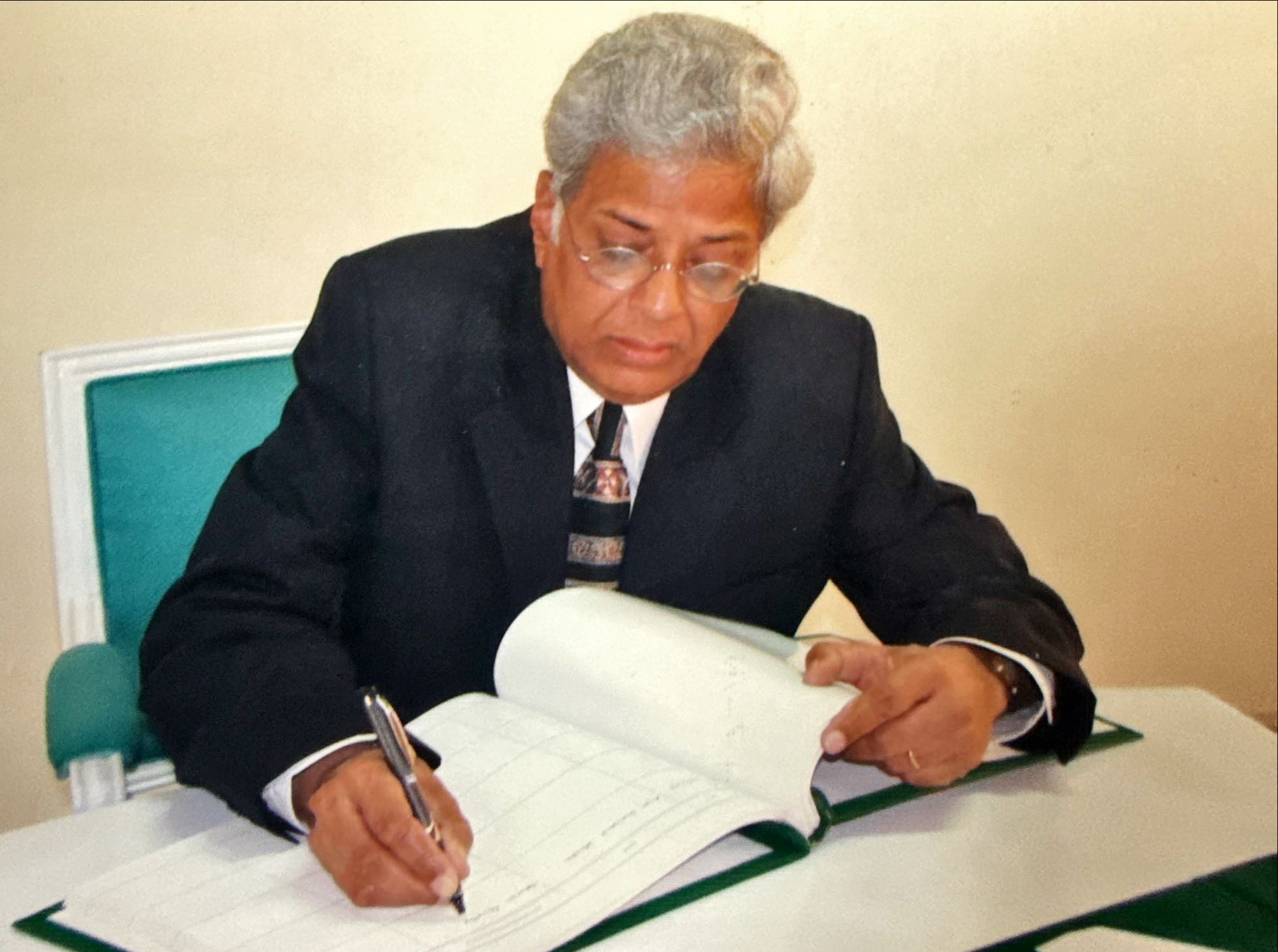

10th Chief Election Commissioner of Bangladesh
- In office 5 February 2007 – 5 February 2012
- President: Iajuddin Ahmed; Zillur Rahman
- Prime Minister: Fakhruddin Ahmed; Sheikh Hasina
- Preceded by: M. A. Aziz
- Succeeded by: Kazi Rakibuddin Ahmad

Personal details
- Born: 10 July 1943 Faridpur, Bengal Province, British India
- Died: 5 July 2025 (aged 81) Dhaka, Bangladesh
- Education: Syracuse University
- Profession: Civil servant

A. T. M. Shamsul Huda (10 July 1943 – 5 July 2025) was a Bangladeshi civil servant and chief election commissioner of Bangladesh.

== Background ==
Huda was born on 10 July 1943 in Faridpur in the then British India. He got his bachelor's and master's in history from the University of Dhaka. He later earned his PhD in public administration from Syracuse University.

== Career ==
Huda joined the Pakistan Civil Service in 1966. He joined the Bangladesh Civil Service after the independence of Bangladesh. He retired from service in 2000. He served as sub-divisional officer in Bagerhat.

Huda was the secretary in the Ministry of Water Resources and Ministry of Finance and before that the managing director of the Bangladesh Agriculture Development Bank.

Huda served as chief election commissioner of Bangladesh and held the Bangladesh national elections in 2008. Huda was a director and vice-chairman of GSP Finance Company (Bangladesh) Limited, a Bangladeshi non-banking financial institution.

== Death ==
Huda died in Dhaka on 5 July 2025, at the age of 81.
