= KM Nurul Huda =

12th Chief Election Commissioner of Bangladesh

K.M. Nurul Huda
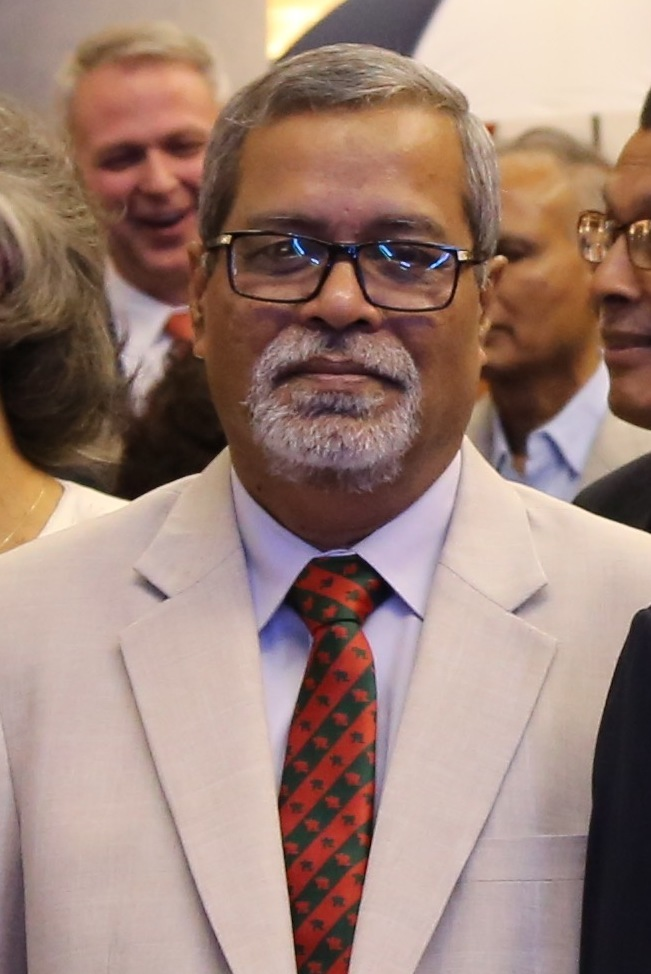

Chief Election Commissioner of Bangladesh
- In office February 15, 2017 – February 14, 2022
- President: Abdul Hamid
- Prime Minister: Sheikh Hasina
- Preceded by: Kazi Rakibuddin Ahmad
- Succeeded by: Kazi Habibul Awal

Personal details
- Born: Khan Mohammad Nurul Huda; 1948 (age 77–78) Bauphal Upazila, Patuakhali
- Relations: SM Shahjada, MP (Nephew)
- Education: University of Dhaka; University of Manchester
- Profession: Civil servant

Khan Mohammad Nurul Huda (born 1948) is a retired secretary of the Government of the People's Republic of Bangladesh and served as the Chief Election Commissioner of Bangladesh from 2017 to 2022. He was a freedom fighter during the Bangladesh Liberation War. He is a former chief executive officer of Dhaka City Corporation. He also served as joint secretary of the Ministry of Environment and Forests and additional secretary to the Secretariat of Bangladeshi Parliament. He wrote a book titled Electronic Voting in Government Elections to Promote Democracy.

== Early life and education ==
Khan Mohammad Nurul Huda was born in 1948 at Nowmala, Bauphal Upazila in Patuakhali district.

Huda completed his schooling in Patuakhali. He obtained his graduation and master's in Statistics from the University of Dhaka.

Huda also studied Public Administration and Advanced Studies at the University of Manchester, and pursued further studies in the then Soviet Union.

== Career ==
Huda took part in Bangladesh Liberation War from sector-9.

Huda is a Bangladesh Civil Service cadre of 1973's Freedom Fighter batch. He served as the Deputy Commissioner and District Magistrate of Cumilla and Faridpur districts. In 2006 he was forced to retire from the public service during the Bangladesh Nationalist Party-Jamaat-led alliance government from 2001 to 2006 even before he became the secretary but a Supreme Court ruling gave him the status of secretary.

Huda worked as the director, administration and human resources, for Gemcon Ltd. He also served as the chairman of North West Zone Power Distribution Company Ltd, and the managing director of Bangladesh Municipal Development Fund.

President Abdul Hamid appointed Huda as the Chief Election Commissioner of Bangladesh on February 6, 2017. He took oath as the new CEC on February 15, 2017.

While serving as the Chief Election Commissioner, Huda's nephew, SM Shahjada, was elected to parliament from Patuakhali-3 as an Awami League candidate in 2018 general elections. The Bangladesh Nationalist Party called for his resignation due to the conflict of interest.

In January 2022, Huda called his fellow Election Commissioner, Mahbub Talukdar, a "liar" after Talukdar criticized violence during elections.

In June 2025, Huda was attacked by a mob in Dhaka after a case was filed against him and other former officials of the Election Commission by the Bangladesh Nationalist Party. The mob assault drew criticism, and despite government promises of strict action, rights groups say there's little accountability for rising mob violence.

Huda confessed in a Dhaka court about the irregularities that took place in the Parliamentary Election of 2018. In his confession, he said that the intelligence agency took control of the field and the election was blatantly stage-managed and farcical. .
