= Kazi Rakibuddin Ahmad =

Bangladeshi civil servant

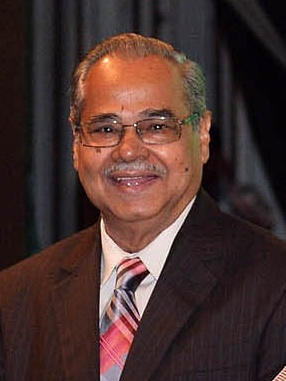
- Ahmad in 2016

11th Chief Election Commissioner of Bangladesh
- In office 9 February 2012 – 9 February 2017
- President: Zillur Rahman; Mohammad Abdul Hamid
- Prime Minister: Sheikh Hasina
- Preceded by: A. T. M. Shamsul Huda
- Succeeded by: KM Nurul Huda

Personal details
- Born: 2 December 1943 (age 82) Chuadanga, Bengal, British India
- Education: University of Dhaka; Boston University; Georgetown University

Kazi Rakibuddin Ahmad (born 2 December 1943) is a retired Bangladeshi civil servant and former Chief Election Commissioner of Bangladesh.

== Early life ==
A veteran freedom fighter, Ahmad was born in Chuadanga on 2 December 1943.

== Education ==
Ahmad studied chemistry at University of Dhaka and secured first class second position in the MSc examination. In 1966 he joined the chemistry department of Dhaka University as a lecturer. The next year he joined the Civil Service of Pakistan (CSP) as an officer. Ahmad completed his MBA from Boston University, and received professional training at Harvard University. As a Research Fellow in Harvard University Centre for Population Studies, he worked on Population and Resource development. He completed Investment Negotiation Course at the Law Center of the Institute of International and Foreign Trade Law, Georgetown University, USA.

== Career ==
During the Bangladesh Liberation war in 1971, Ahmad served in the Mujibnagar government as Sub Divisional Officer, Brahmanbaria and was Deputy Secretary and Zonal Administrative Officer under the First Bangladesh Government in Mujibnagar. During the war he served as a zonal coordinating officer of the freedom fighters who took shelter in Agartala, India. After the Independence of Bangladesh, he joined the Bangladeshi civil service.

Ahmad served as the Deputy Commissioner and District Magistrate of Cumilla district, Director General of NGO Affairs Bureau, Chairman of Trading Corporation of Bangladesh and Chairman of Bangladesh Chemical Industries Corporation. He served as Secretary, Ministry of Primary and Mass Education, Secretary, Ministry of Information and Secretary, Ministry of Education and Secretary to the Bangladesh Parliament (Jatiya Sangshad). He retired from Government service in 2003 after 36 years of service. Ahmad was appointed the Chief Election Commissioner of Bangladesh on 9 February 2012.

Ahmad presided over the 5 January 2014 general election in Bangladesh, which was boycotted by the main opposition Bangladesh Nationalist Party. He oversaw the 2016 countrywide Zila Parishad election. Under Ahmad's leadership, the Election Commission (EC) launched the distribution of machine-readable smart national identity (NID) cards among 10 crore citizens, replacing the existing paper-laminated cards and updated the voter list.

Ahmad's term as the Chief Election Commissioner ended on 9 February 2017.

After the fall of the Sheikh Hasina-led Awami League government, a sedition case was filed against Ahmad along with other former Election Commissioners in September 2024. A travel ban was imposed on Ahmad in August 2025 along with other former Election Commissioners. Bangladesh Nationalist Party filed a case against him in June 2025.
