= Criticism of the Awami League =

Negative aspects of Bangladesh Awami League, as discussed in the media

The Boat, symbol of Awami League

Public criticisms of the Bangladesh Awami League include the Bangladesh Chhatra League, the Jubo League, the Swechchhasebak League, etc., as well as other bodies with which Awami League is overtly or allegedly involved, when they were in power or not. Notable examples include the Murder of Abrar Fahad, the Padma Bridge graft scandal, the Murder of Biswajit Das, the Murder of Sagar Sarowar and Meherun Runi, the Bangladesh Rifles revolt, the 2013 Shapla Square protests, the Bangladesh quota reform movement, the Violence of Bangladesh Chhatra League, the S Alam Group scandal, the Logi Boitha Movement, issues over disputed elections in 2009, 2014 and 2018, and the corruption at the Rooppur Nuclear Power Plant, etc.

== Jatiya Rakkhi Bahini ==
The Rakkhi Bahini committed various human rights abuses, including extrajudicial killing, forced disappearances, shooting by death squads, and rape. Jatiya Samajtantrik Dal claims that over 60,000 of its members were killed. The most conservative estimates put the death toll at over 2,000.

Anthony Mascarenhas chronicled the activities of Jatiyo Rakkhi Bahini in his book Bangladesh: A Legacy of Blood, where he writes:

The Jatiyo Rakkhi Bahini, which roughly translated means National Security Force, was an elite para-military force whose members had to take oaths of personal loyalty to Mujib. Despite its high-sounding name, it was a sort of private army of bully boys not far removed from Nazi Brown shirts.

Mascarenhas adds that by the end of 1973, the total of politically motivated murders in Bangladesh had crossed the 2,000 mark. The victims included some members of Parliament and many of the murders resulted from intra-party conflicts within Awami League. Within three years, political killings by Jatiyo Rakkhi Bahini reached 30,000. This included numerous Jatiyo Samajtantrik Dal members. Even the capital Dhaka was not immune to the violence. An unofficial curfew was introduced after midnight. Almost every rickshaw, taxi and private car was checked and searched by Rokkhi Bahini personnel.

=== 1974 Ramna massacre ===
Jasad, frequently tortured and attacked by JRB, decided to hold a rally on 17 March at Paltan. They also made a plan to surround the residence of Home Minister Muhammad Mansur Ali on the same day after the rally. On 17 March 1975, agitated Jasad supporters tried to set up a barricade in front of the residence of the Home Minister Muhammad Mansur Ali after the rally. But prepared JRB personnel started firing indiscriminately upon the crowd leaving several people dead on the spot. A notable occurrence occurred on 17 March 1975. Jatiyo Rakkhi Bahini set up fire on the headquarters of JASAD on 14 March 1975. JASAD decided to form a rally towards Home Minister Mansoor Ali's house and surround it as a counter to that incident on 17 March.

The rally that started from Paltan was forwarded to the Home Minister's house but the Jatiyo Rakkhi Bahini opened brush fire and at least 50 JASAD activists were killed on the spot.

During the regime of Sheikh Mujibur Rahman, thousands of youths were killed due to the suspicion of having a connection with JASAD by Jatiyo Rakkhi Bahini. Among them was a leader of Bangladesh Krishok League central committee and a teacher of Nawabganj High School Siddiqur Rahman Khan was killed on 10 October 1972. On 17 September 1973, JASAD Student's League leader Bablu, Robi, Ebadat Ali, Motaleb, Kalu, and many others were killed in daylight by Jatiyo Rakkhi Bahini.

Notable victims include: General Secretary of City College Students' Union Jahangir, student of Jahangir Nagar University Shah Borhan Uddin Rokon, student of BUET Nikhil Chandra Saha; Narshingdi JASAD leader Alauddin; JASAD leader from Gazipur Akram, Joinal, Shamsu, Badal, Anwar; Manikganj JASAD leader Shahadat Hossain Badal, Delwar Hossain Haraj, Abdul Awal Naju, Najim; activists from Jamalpur Giasuddin Master; JASAD activist Abdur Rashid, Hasu Miah; leader from Mymensingh Masuduzzaman, Abdul Jabbar; Madaripur JASAD activist Jahngir, Saddam, Ali Hosen, Mofijur; Faridpur's Kamaluzzaman, Abdul Hakim; Moniddin Ahmed, Salam Master, Rafique Uddin from Razshahi; Ata, Ranju, Manik Das Gupta, Tota, Colonel Rana, Khalil, Rajjak of Bagura; Natore's JASAD leader Nasiruddin; leader from Pabna Ashfaqur Rahman Kalu.

Siraj Sikder was a revolutionary fighter. He was educated in EPUET, now which is known as BUET. After the independence war, he started his mission to establish a socialist society. During the war on 3 June, he established the political party Purba Bangla Sharbahara Party. On the first congress of the party, he was elected as the party's president on 14 January 1972. He started working as the President of the party. In 1973, he was elected as the President of an alliance of eleven peoples' organization named Purba Banglar Jatyo Mukti Front (National Liberation Front of East Bengal). However, analyzing the political situation of the country which was named "One Party Democracy" by the Guardian, and the increasing torture of his party members, forced him to choose the way of revolution.

On 28 December 1974, the government announced the first-ever state of emergency in the history of Bangladesh to arrest all the terrorists and opposition leaders. From then, Sikder was being treated as an outlaw by the law and enforcement forces. He went underground after the promulgation of the emergency. A Jatiyo Rakkhi Bahini commander later denied that the murder of Sikder was committed by his force.

Aruna Sen the wife of politician Shanti Sen, was detained by the Jatiya Rokkhi Bahini, along with her relative Chanchal Sen. She was subjected to torture while in captivity. Aruna Sen published a statement regarding her captivity in the 17 March edition of Weekly Holiday and in the June edition of Monthly Sangskriti in 1974. After Aruna Sen was detained, a writ was filed at Supreme Court. The court asked Jatiyo Rakkhi Bahini to present her in front of the court and prove her detention legal. They presented her but failed to support the legality of the detention.

Shahjahan was an 18-year-old boy from what is now Naria Upazila of Faridpur District. He was arrested in Dhaka on 28 December 1973 and handed over to the Rakkhi Bahini at their request. He was not seen again after 2 January 1974, when his brother said he saw him in custody at Rakkhi Bahini headquarters. His brother petitioned the court for a writ of habeas corpus, challenging the legality of Shahjahan's detention. The Rakkhi Bahini responded that Shahjahan had escaped on 29 December, so was not in detention and could not be brought to the court. On cross examination, officers said the organization followed no regulations or procedure. They kept no records of their searches, seizures, arrests, or other activities. Former Prime Minister Moudud Ahmed believes that because Shahjahan allegedly belonged to the student wing of the Jatiyo Samajtantrik Dal, an opposition political party, the Rakkhi Bahini killed him and secretly disposed of his body. Without evidence, however, the Rakkhi Bahini could not be held to account.

The court held that the Rakkhi Bahini version of events was "a pure concoction" that "demonstrates complete disregard of the law of the country." In May 1974, Justice Debesh Bhattacharya, condemned the organization in his verdict, stating:

The irregular and very unsatisfactory manner of the handling of the matter by the Rakkhi Bahini has created a situation that urgently calls for an effective action on the part of the authorities to clear the cloud and create a sense of assurance in the mind of the people.

The court urged the government to hold an inquiry into the whereabouts of Shahjahan, but none was ever undertaken.

Ayesha Faiz is the widow of Faizur Rahman and the mother of novelists Humayun Ahmed and Muhammad Zafar Iqbal. A house in Babar Road of Mohammadpur was allotted to her by the government for her husband. But just after three days she was kicked out of the house with her family by a Subedar Major of Jatiyo Rakkhi Bahini. She detailed the incident in her biography Jibon Je Rokom (Life as it is). Ayesha Faiz left the home with her children. She later recalled: "Once I was made refugee by the Pakistan Army of occupation. The second time it was done by Sheikh Mujibur Rahman's Jatiyo Rakkhi Bahini".

=== 1974 famine ===
When the famine started, millions of people came to the capital from villages in search of food. The government decided to drive the poor and have-nots out of the capital as it was embarrassed in front of the international community with the famine. On 3 January, Jatiyo Rakkhi Bahini was deployed to 'Clean Dhaka' depriving the poor beggars and the destitute from the city. In this operation, about 0.2 million have-nots and slum dwellers were taken away from the capital and were forced either to return to their villages or to be moved to the three camps. The camps were hastily laid out several miles from the city. The condition of the camps was disastrous. Amongst the three camps, the camp of Demra was the most appalling one, where Jatiya Rakkhi Bahini gathered about 50,000 people. Those people were ill-treated and sometimes they felt that death was a better solution.

Al Mahmud did not listen to the government and tried to publish accurate news. When the government came to know that, they sent three trucks full of Police and Jatiyo Rakkhi Bahini personnel to seize the office and press of Gonokontho at night, and arrested the Editor Al Mahmud along with seven workers of the press.

== Party-partiality against rape-murder case ==
In 1975, the army was already dissatisfied with Sheikh Mujib for sidelining them in favor of the JRB. However, in his book Bangladesh: A Legacy of Blood, Anthony Mascarenhas cited a specific factor behind the final outcry as influential: Mozammel, a contemporary Awami League youth leader from Tongi and the chairman of Tongi Awami League, seized a car of a newlywed housewife, killed her driver and husband, abducted her and gang-raped her and three days later, her dead body was found in the road near a bridge of Tongi. Mozammel was arrested by a leader of a squadron of the Bengal Lancer named Major Nasser and handed over to the police, but the police released him immediately. He was released from the punishment of that crime with the intervention of Sheikh Mujib. This incident increased the dissatisfaction against Sheikh Mujib in the Army, specially in Major Faruque and acted as one of the prominently last-minute influences behind his assassination.

== Second Revolution ==
"The fourth amendment became unavoidable to face socio-economic and law and order situations of the country. The global political reality also influenced to the adoption of the fourth amendment. It is to be mentioned that socialist countries of the world have the instance of single-party political system. But before the new system of government could come in effect in full swing in the country, the ruthless massacre was held on 15 August 1975."

— A part of grade 9-10 textbook History of Bangladesh and World Civilizations 2022

The Second Revolution is generally represented positively in official Bangladeshi historiography. But it’s also criticized by political thinkers and historians. Political scientist Rounaq Jahan questioned the goals of the revolution, writing: "It is hard to explain why one would need a revolution to achieve such reformist goals!". According to Jahan, Sheikh Mujib's political plan was to replicate in Bangladesh, India's variant of the Westminster model—a "one-dominant party" parliamentary democracy. She also argued that the "second revolution" did not bring any radical change as the new model was no better than 'putting old wine into new bottle' through 'keeping the same old leadership with the same factional cleavages and the same style'.

Though, the revolution was aimed at fostering national unity, Mujib has been criticised for not making any visible steps to achieve the objective. Only eight out of hundred fifteen posts of the central committee was given to the leaders of those parties who joined the platform of national unity, BaKSAL. In the highest decision-making council of BaKSAL, there was no participation of any parties other than the Awami League.

A. F. Salahuddin Ahmed, the historian, termed the revolution as in truth a political death for Bangladesh.

== Bangladesh Rifles revolt ==
The 2009 Bangladesh Rifles Revolt was a mutiny staged on 25 and 26 February 2009 in Dhaka by a section of the Bangladesh Rifles (BDR), a paramilitary force mainly tasked with guarding the borders of Bangladesh. The rebel BDR soldiers took over the BDR headquarters in Pilkhana, killing BDR director-general Shakil Ahmed along with 56 other army officers and 17 civilians. They also fired on civilians, held many of their officers and their families hostage, vandalised property and looted valuables. By the second day, unrest had spread to 12 other towns and cities. The mutiny ended as the mutineers surrendered their arms and released the hostages after a series of discussions and negotiations with the government. The Daily Star commented on Prime Minister Sheikh Hasina's sagacious handling of the situation which resulted in the prevention of a further bloodbath".

== Massacre in the 2013 Shapla Square protests ==
The 2013 Shapla Square protests, also known as Operation Shapla or Operation Flash Out by security forces, refers to the protests, and subsequent shootings, of 5 and 6 May 2013 at Shapla Square located in the Motijheel district, the main financial area of Dhaka, Bangladesh. The protests were organized by the Islamist advocacy group, Hefazat-e Islam, who were demanding the enactment of a blasphemy law. The government responded to the protests by cracking down on the protesters using a combined force drawn from the police, Rapid Action Battalion and paramilitary Border Guard Bangladesh to drive the protesters out of Shapla Square.

== Murder of Abrar Fahad ==
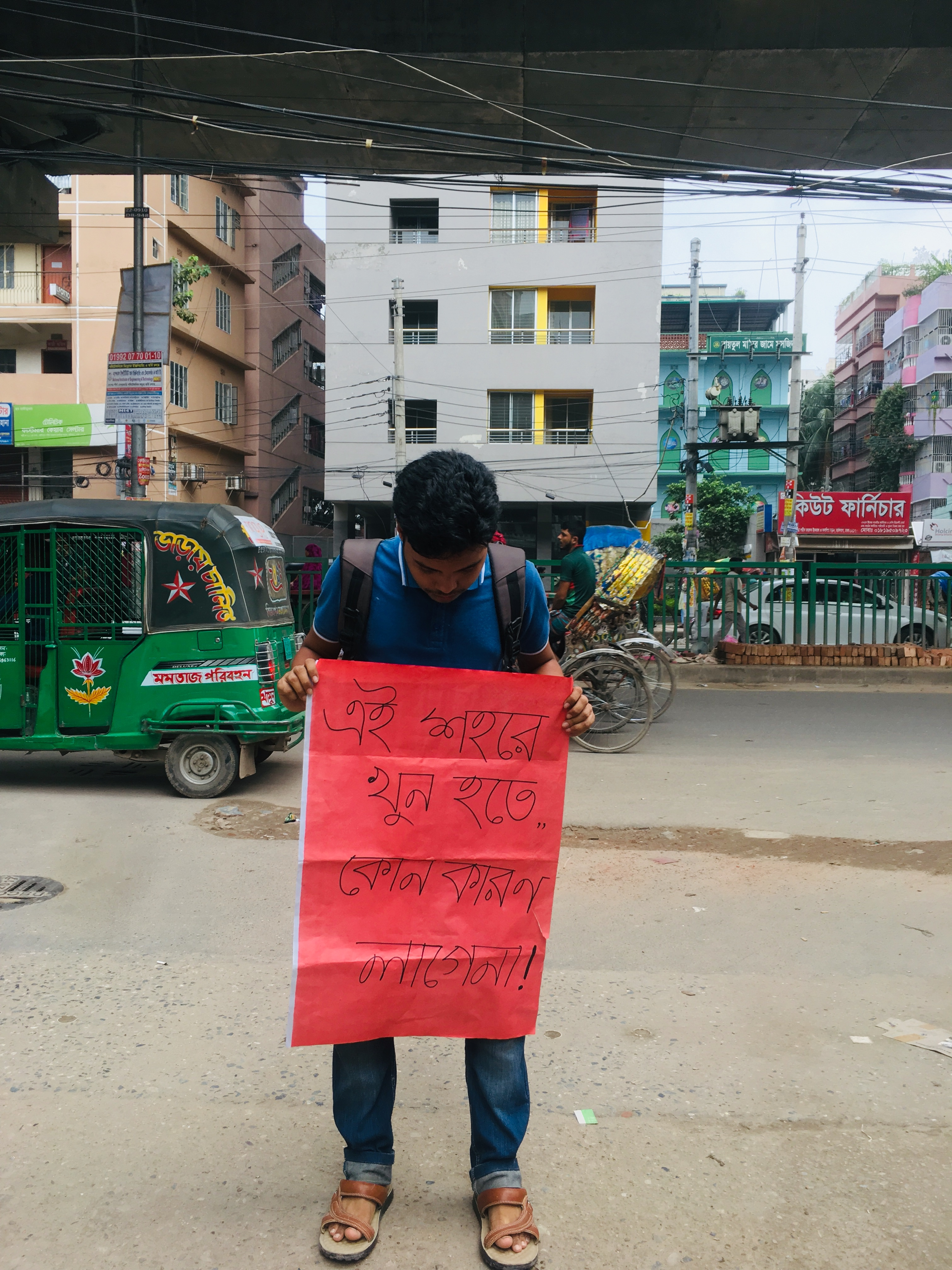
Protest against the killing of BUET student Abrar Fahad

On October 6, 2019, Abrar Fahad, a second-year student in the Electrical and Electronic Engineering (EEE) department at Bangladesh University of Engineering and Technology (BUET), was murdered inside BUET's Sher-e-Bangla Hall by activists of Chhatra League, student wing of the Awami League.

The incident sparked national outrage and led to protests against campus violence. Out of 25 convicts, 20 were given death sentence and 5 others were give life sentence in relation to the murder of Abrar Fahad following a highly publicized trial. An autopsy report later confirmed that Fahad died as a result of severe blunt force trauma.

== Murder of Sagar Sarowar and Meherun Runi ==
The murder of Sagar Sarowar and Meherun Runi was the unsolved double murder case of two well-known, married Bangladeshi journalists who were stabbed to death. The case is still open, and DNA testing indicates that the murder may be the work of two men. The couple's murder received high-level political attention and widespread media coverage in Bangladesh and also attracted German interest as Sarowar had lived in Germany and worked as a journalist for Deutsche Welle. The case was also closely watched by journalists and international press freedom organisations. The couple's murder furthermore unified a number of organisations representing Bangladeshi journalists that had previously been separate. A representative of the family said, "In the past 25 years, this has been the most talked/written about, prioritized case in Bangladesh." A demonstration was called in 2017 for the fifth anniversary of the murder to demand the release of the investigation report.

== Murder of Biswajit Das ==
Biswajit Das was a 24-year-old tailor in Dhaka, Bangladesh, who was murdered on 9 December 2012 by members of the Bangladesh Chhatra League (BCL), the student wing of the governing Awami League party. On that day there was a nationwide road blockade, called by the opposition 18 Party Alliance. That morning, Das was on his way to his shop, Amantron Tailors at Shankhari Bazaar in Old Dhaka, when one or more small bombs exploded near an anti-blockade procession of BCL activists from Jagannath University. A group of them mistook Das for an opposition supporter and chased him from near Bahadur Shah Park into a nearby building. They attacked him with machetes, iron bars, and hockey sticks. Das attempted to escape but fell on Shankhari Bazar Road. A rickshaw-puller took Das to Mitford Hospital, where he died shortly after from his wounds.

== Rana Plaza Tragedy ==
The Rana Plaza collapse occurred on 24 April 2013 in Savar Upazila, near Dhaka, Bangladesh, when the eight-story Rana Plaza commercial building collapsed due to a structural failure. The search for survivors lasted for 19 days and ended on 13 May 2013, with a confirmed death toll of 1,134. Approximately 2,500 injured people were rescued from the building. It is considered to be one of the deadliest structural failures in modern human history, as well as the deadliest garment-factory disaster in history, and is the deadliest industrial accident in the history of Bangladesh. The court in Bangladesh formally charged 38 people with murder, along with the building owner Sohel Rana who was member in Jubo League. Rana was arrested after a four-day manhunt, as he attempted to flee across the border to India. A total of 41 defendants faced charges over the collapse of the complex. Of the 41 people charged, 35 (including Rana) appeared before the court and plead not guilty. Rana was not granted bail. He was charged with corruption again in 2017; the trials continue to this day.

== Padma Bridge graft scandal ==
The Padma Bridge graft scandal was a political scandal in Bangladesh in 2016 and 2017, involving the Bangladesh Awami League and the Padma Bridge, a 6.15-kilometer (3.82 mi) road-rail bridge across the Padma River and Bangladesh's longest bridge. The World Bank were to have financed the project with ৳11,367 crore (US$1.2 billion) of credit, but they pulled out citing corruption concerns, specifically that Canadian construction company SNC-Lavalin had bribed a Bangladeshi official in exchange for a construction contract.

Two SNC-Lavalin executives were charged in Canada, but after the court excluded wiretap evidence the prosecution withdrew and the court dismissed the case.

== July massacre ==
The quota reform movement in Bangladesh was organized to demand a reduction of quotas for government jobs and the introduction of recruitment based on merit. There have been three agitations for quota reforms in Bangladesh. So far, the university and college students have generally expressed themselves in favor of this movement, while Awami League, the ruling government, Chhatra League, and like-minded organisations oppose the proposed changes.

The first quota reform movement took place in 2013. Following the 2018 movement, a circular was issued which addressed the demands, but it was subsequently declared invalid by the Supreme Court, leading to a restart of the movement in 2024. On each occasion, Bangladesh Police and Chhatra League attacked the students with lethal force.

== Enforced disappearances and Aynaghar ==
Aynaghar is a clandestine detention facility operated by the Directorate General of Forces Intelligence (DGFI), the intelligence branch of Bangladesh's armed forces. Between 2009 and 2021, under the leadership of Sheikh Hasina, individuals who expressed dissent or criticism against the Awami League government were secretly apprehended and subjected to torture within its confines. Numerous opposition leaders and activists vanished during Sheikh Hasina's tenure. Their locations remain undisclosed. Even the names of military personnel appear on the list of people who have disappeared. Aynaghar, in essence, serves as a covert prison or detention camp managed by the intelligence agencies.

== Allegation of staged Islamic militancy ==
Some victims, political leaders, and critics have alleged that the Awami League government has staged militant suppression dramas to suppress political opponents. BNP Secretary General Mirza Fakhrul Islam Alamgir claimed,

You have seen a few days ago … some innocent people from a locality were picked up saying they were militants arrested from deep inside a jungle. They need to do this as they want to show there is militancy and are militants in Bangladesh … only they are needed to curb this. This is their prime objective and they want to show this to the Western world and India.

The editor of The Daily Amar Desh, Mahmudur Rahman, has said that during Hasina's fascist regime, many newspapers have staged Islamic militancy dramas. Bangladesh Jamaat-e-Islami Ameer Shafiqur Rahman stated, "Under the Awami League’s rule, people have been imprisoned for 15 years in the name of militancy dramas. In his view, countless mothers have lost their children during this period."

Two students from Khulna University, Noor Mohammad Anik and Md. Mojahidul Islam Rafi, have been imprisoned for five years on suspicion of being militants. A press conference was held at the university on February 23 demanding their release. It is alleged that they were framed in a staged militant drama orchestrated by the Awami League government and given a sentence. They come from non-religiously conservative, ordinary families and were trying to support themselves financially. They were arrested in 2020, and it is claimed that they were subjected to inhumane treatment after their detention.

Masud Sayeedi accused the Awami League government of being hostile to Islam and scholars. He claimed many Islamic scholars, including his father, Delwar Hossain Sayeedi, were arrested. He stated that in 2002, Khaleda Zia declared Jianagar as an upazila, but the Awami League later renamed it Indurkani without visible development. He also warned that Sheikh Hasina’s followers might conspire against Islam and Muslims, urging vigilance.

On April 2, 2025, Ruhul Kabir Rizvi said, "Awami League's friends are spreading misinformation around the world. The drama that Sheikh Hasina has done in the name of suppressing militants has been shown to the world. It was her political strategy to stay in power. It has also appeared in the speech of a former IGP."

== Rooppur pillow scandal ==
The documents of the housing project, called Green City, were published in May 2019, and excessive prices listed in the documents prompted allegations of corruption. In 2019, the Bangladesh Citizen Council's convener priced an average pillow as costing from ৳250 (equivalent to ৳370 or US$3.00 in 2024) to ৳300 (equivalent to ৳440 or US$3.60 in 2024). But the documented price of each pillow was ৳5957 (US$49), approximately 20 times the market value. An exorbitant amount of ৳931 (US$7.60) was documented as the cost of transportation per pillow to the housing complex. Cots were priced at ৳43357 (US$350) and dining table sets were documented to be of ৳114674 (US$930). According to the ministry's expenditure policy, the central authority must approve purchases above ৳30 crore (US$2.4 million). To circumvent this, the purchase of ৳30 crore was split into five parts. Three contracting companies were hired to purchase the products. Among these, the goods supplied by Sajin Enterprise were of low quality. Media outlets including Prothom Alo and Pabna Samachar reported that Golam Faruk Khandakar Prince, MP of the area, was involved with this organization. Another contractor, Majid Sons, was reported to have been negligent in the supply of construction products.

== Bangladesh share market scam ==
The stock market was in turbulence throughout much of 2009, with the long bullish trend starting to turn down. The bullish trend was initiated by the end of the two-year political crisis and re-emergence of democracy when Awami League won the December 2008 polls, and was largely unaffected by the BDR Mutiny. The market was heavily aided by the entrance of Grameenphone into the capital market, when the index rose by 22% over a single day on 16 November 2009. Share prices continued to fluctuate, reaching the annual high in mid-2009 before plummeting by the end of 2009, with retail investors threatening a hunger strike. Notably, Bangladesh also faced such a stock market crash in 1996. The Awami League was in government during both of the crashes.

The market continued to be turbulent throughout 2010, with the DSE hitting its all-time high revenue and the largest fall in a single day since the 1996 market crash, within the space of a month.

By the end of 2010, it was known that the capital markets of Bangladesh were overvalued and overheated. The central bank had taken measures to cool the market down and control inflation by putting a leash on the liquidity.

The conservative monetary measures adversely affected the capital market, with the market falling once on 13 December by 285 points, over 3% of the DGEN Index which stood at around 8,500 points. The capital markets suffered a second fall on 19 December, with the index falling a further 551 points, or about 7%. This 7% fall of the Dhaka Stock Exchange's index was the largest single-day fall in the 55-year history of the Exchange, surpassing the fall of the 1996 market crash. This fall was deemed 'normal' by analysts, who believed the market was overvalued. Investors took to the streets with protests. Random objects like wood and papers were set on fire in front of the DSE office in Motijheel.

Immediate measures were taken by the regulatory body the Bangladesh Securities and Exchange Commission, which, together with the Bangladesh Bank, relaxed its earlier conservative measures to pacify the fall. As a result, the market ameliorated the next day by 1.9%.

Within December 2010 and January 2011, the DGEN index fell from 8,500 by 1,800 points, a total 21% fall, with masterminds of the crash making about BDT 50 billion ($ 667 million) out of the scam.

The market fell by 5% on 12 June, before taking a 4% plunge on 11 October, sending the market into further turmoil. The fall finally triggered small investors to go on a fast-unto-death on 16 October after forming the Bangladesh Capital Market Investors' Council. Opposition politicians declared their solidarity with the protesters. The market stood at around 5,500 index points in October 2011 from 8,900 only a year ago.

Protests continued throughout the months, the most recent ones taking place in front of the DSE office in November 2011, with protesters sitting in throughout night.

== Hallmark-Sonali Bank Loan Scam ==
In 1972, after the Bangladesh Liberation War, Sonali Bank was formed by the amalgamation and nationalisation of the National Bank of Pakistan, Bank of Bahawalpur, and Premier Bank branches located in the former East Pakistan. It is the largest state-owned commercial bank in Bangladesh.

The perceived level of public sector corruption has consistently placed the country in the worst quartile of Transparency International's Corruption Perceptions Index. One form this rampant corruption takes is senior officials in public sector banks making imprudent loans to well-connected private companies. State-owned banks are a major originator of bad loans to the private sector.

== Attack on Jatiyatabadi Swechchhasebak Dal President ==
The local leaders and activists of Bangladesh Nationalist Party and its allied organizations organized a roadside gathering in Ghonapara, Gopalganj to mark the arrival of central president of Bangladesh Jatiyatabadi Sechchasebak Dal, S. M. Jilani, at his hometown in Tungipara, Gopalganj. After the rally at Bedgram in the town, BNP leaders and activists set off towards Ghonapara of Gopalganj district. When their convoy reached Ghonapara, local leaders and activists of the Awami League launched a sudden attack on them. In the attack, first-class umpire of Bangladesh Cricket Board and sports secretary of central committee of the Bangladesh Jatiyatabadi Sechchasebak Dal, Shawkat Ali Didar, along with Gopalganj metropolitan Sechchasebak Dal leader Liton, were killed. The attack also left at least 50 people injured, including Sechchhasebak Dal president SM Jilani, his wife, Gopalganj District Mahila Dal president Rowshan Ara Ratna, and Somoy TV cameraman HM Manik.

BNP Secretary General Mirza Fakhrul Islam Alamgir expressed deep concern over the incident in a statement. Bangladesh Jamaat-e-Islami condemned and protested the attack on the convoy of the Sechchhasebak Dal's president and the resulting loss of life. The party described the attack as brutal and cowardly. The Anti-discrimination Students Movement demanded the immediate arrest and prosecution of those involved in the attack. Additionally, they called for a ban on the Awami League and all its affiliated organizations for their involvement in terrorist activities.

== See also ==
- Human rights in Bangladesh
- Enforced disappearance in Bangladesh
- Crossfire (Bangladesh)
- Amar Fashi Chai
- Fascism
