= Bangladesh quota reform movement (disambiguation) =

Bangladesh quota reform movement may refer to:

- 2013 Bangladesh quota reform movement
- 2018 Bangladesh quota reform movement
- 2024 Bangladesh quota reform movement
