= BCS Examination =

Examination for the Bangladesh Civil Service

The BCS Examination (Bengali: বিসিএস পরীক্ষা) is a nationwide competitive civil service entrance examination in Bangladesh conducted by the Bangladesh Public Service Commission (BPSC) for recruitment to the various Bangladesh Civil Service cadres, including BCS (Administration), BCS (Foreign Affairs), and BCS (Police) among others. The examination is conducted in three phases - the preliminary examination, the written examination and the viva voce. Candidates appear for different courses to pass those exam phases. The process from the notification of the preliminary examination to declaration of the final results takes one-and-a-half to two years.

== Process ==
Bangladesh Civil Service Examination is based on the British Raj - era Imperial Civil Service. The Civil Services Examination of Bangladesh is considered as one of the toughest examinations in Bangladesh. On an average, 450,000 to 500,000 candidates apply every year and the percentage of candidates appearing is roughly 90%. Aspirants must complete a three-stage process, with a final success rate of about 0.2% for all cadres and 0.05% for general cadres, although it varies from years to years exam.

- Phase I: Preliminary examination - This is qualifying test usually held in May/June every year. Notification for this is published about one month before the exam. Results are published about one month after the exam.
- Phase II: Written examination - This is the main test, usually held in October/November/December every year. Notification for this is published about one month before the exam. Results are usually published 6 to 10 months after the exam.
- Phase III: Viva Voce (Interview) - It is the oral test and is held after the publication of written result.

Final result is published about 1.5 to 2 months after finishing the viva voce.

== Eligibility ==
The eligibility norms for the examination are as follows:

=== Nationality ===
All candidates must be Bangladeshi citizens. Candidates who are committed to marry or thereby engaged to foreign nationals should apply for a Permit/NOC to the Government of People's Republic of Bangladesh; applications can not be made without a Permit/NOC.

=== Age ===
- 21 to 32 years (for General candidates).
- The maximum age limit of freedom fighters and the children of freedom fighters, candidates with disabilities, and BCS (Health) cadre candidates is 34.

=== Academic ===
Master's degree or 4-year bachelor's degree after Higher Secondary Certificate (HSC) Exam. More than one third class in any academic phase is considered as disqualification of a candidate.

=== Criticism of the quota system ===
The quota system has been highly criticized by the civil society members and intellectuals. Further continuation of freedom fighter quota among their children and grandchildren is highly controversial and, to some extent, a violation of Article 19 and 29 of the Constitution of Bangladesh. The students demonstrated a mass protest against this quota system in 2013. On 8 April 2018, students of Dhaka University began a protest to reform the quota. They clashed violently with police, who fired teargas shells and used water cannons to try to disperse the protestors. Protestors threw brickbats at the police, vandalized buildings, and started fires. Police charged them with batons and fired rubber bullets. At least 50 people were injured in the fighting in Dhaka, some critically.

Anti Quota Protests were spread to other parts of the country which made this protest a vital political issue. The Prime Minister of Bangladesh committed to remove this quota system as soon as possible.

In October 2018, the government eliminated the quota system for recruitment to grade 9 and higher government jobs. In 2020, they went a step further, abolishing quotas for grade 8 and higher government posts.

== Preliminary examination ==
This 2-hour examination is a screening test conducted on the following pattern:

- Bengali - 35 Questions
- English - 35 Questions
- General knowledge on Bangladesh affairs -30 questions
- General knowledge on International affairs - 20 Questions
- General science - 15 Questions
- Computer - 15 questions
- Mathematical reasoning - 15 questions
- Mental ability - 15 Questions
- Ethics and good governance - 10 questions
- Geography - 10 questions

== Main exams ==
=== Written examination ===
==== General cadre ====
Nine compulsory subjects

- General Bengali (Part I & II) = 200 Marks
- General English (Part I & II) = 200 Marks
- Bangladesh Affairs (Part I & II) = 200 Marks
- International Affairs = 100 Marks
- Mathematical Reasoning and Mental Ability = 100 Marks
- General Science and Technology = 100 Marks

==== Technical cadre ====
Seven compulsory subjects and two post related subjects.

- General Bengali = 100 Marks
- General English (Part I & II) = 200 Marks
- Bangladesh Affairs (Part I & II) = 200 Marks
- International Affairs = 100 Marks
- Mathematical Reasoning and Mental Ability = 100 Marks
- Two Papers for post Related subject = 200 Marks

==== Both cadre ====
One applying for both cadres: Nine compulsory subjects and two post related subjects

=== Viva voce (interview) ===
Candidates who pass the written phase successfully are qualified for the interview commonly known as viva voce. Success rate in this rigorous phase is quite lower than other phases. Current marks allocation for viva voce is 100.

== Final selection ==
BPSC selects the candidates on the basis of the aggregated marks of the written exam (obtained marks out of 900) and viva voce (obtained marks out of 100). BPSC makes a merit list for those who obtain pass marks in the written and viva exam. Preliminary marks are not considered in this regard. Previously, 45% of the selection was made on the basis of merit and rest 55% according to several quotas, but now that the quota system has been cancelled, 100% of the selection is based on merit. BPSC recommends the selected qualified candidates to the Ministry of Public Administration. The ministry publishes the gazette of the selected candidates after a rigorous inspection of medical tests by DGHS, Police verification and NSI verification. Generally, the entire process from the advertisement to the final date of joining takes one year.

== Salary structure ==
In the new pay scale, the highest basic pay is Tk 78,000 while the minimum basic is Tk 8,250. An officer who joins government service through the BCS examination gets a basic pay of Tk 22,000, besides getting house rent in accordance with the area of residence and medical reimbursements.
