= 2022 Search Committee =

Search Committee, 2022
- Formation: 5 February 2022
- Type: Government
- Region served: Bangladesh
- Members: 6
- Chairman: Obaidul Hassan
- Members: SM Kuddus Zaman; Mohammad Muslim Chowdhury; Sohrab Hossain; Sohul Hussain; Anwara Syed Haq
- Affiliations: President of Bangladesh

2022 Search Committee is a committee set up by President Mohammad Abdul Hamid on 5 February 2022, to select qualified persons for the post of Chief Election Commissioner and other Election Commissioners of the 13th Bangladesh Election Commission. Obaidul Hassan is the chairman of this committee with 6 members. Although two such committees have been formed in Bangladesh before, this is the first committee formed by law. One week before the formation of this committee, the Chief Election Commissioner and Other Election Commissioners Appointment Act, 2022 was passed. The ruling Awami League welcomed this committee. However, 15 political parties, including the main opposition party BNP and Islami Andolan Bangladesh, refrain from being involved in all the activities of the committee. President Abdul Hamid formed the Habibul Awal Commission on 26 February with the recommendations of the committee.

== Background ==
In 2012, President Zillur Rahman initiated the formation of a new Election Commission by establishing a mediation platform known as the Search Committee. The first committee, consisting of four members, was chaired by Syed Mahmud Hossain of the Appellate Division of the Supreme Court. Based on its recommendations, the Election Commission headed by Kazi Rakibuddin Ahmad was appointed. A similar process took place in 2017 under President Abdul Hamid, who reappointed Justice Hossain to lead a six-member Search Committee. This committee recommended the formation of the Election Commission led by KM Nurul Huda. Both commissions were viewed by critics as being closely aligned with the ruling Awami League.

As the tenure of the Nurul Huda Commission approached its end in February 2022, the government began preparations in December 2021 for forming the 13th Election Commission. Between 20 December 2021 and 17 January 2022, President Hamid held dialogues with various political parties; however, some, including the main opposition, boycotted the discussions. Many of the participating parties proposed the enactment of a law to regulate the appointment of the commission. Although initially hesitant, the government passed the "Chief Election Commissioner and Other Election Commissioners Appointment Act, 2022" on 27 January. The law was officially gazetted on 29 January following presidential approval. Pursuant to this legislation, a six-member Search Committee was formed on 5 February 2022.

== Members ==
This committee headed by Obaidul Hasan of the Appellate Division of the Bangladesh Supreme Court. Justice SM Khuddus Zaman of the High Court Division, Sohrab Hossain, Chairman of the Public Service Commission, and Muslim Chowdhury, Auditor General and Controller of Bangladesh, were appointed as members of the search committee. President also nominated former Election Commissioner Sohul Hossain and novelist Anwara Syed Haq as members of the search committee.
