= Quota system of Bangladesh Civil Service =

Quota system for positions in the Bangladesh Civil Service

The quota system of the Bangladesh Civil Service (BCS) is a recruitment policy, established in 1972 following the 1971 independence of Bangladesh, that reserves a percentage of civil service job positions for specific demographic groups. These include descendants of freedom fighters from the Bangladesh Liberation War, ethnic and religious minorities, residents of underrepresented districts, and persons with disabilities, and initially set a quota of 20 percent of the jobs for merit-based candidates.

Quotas in Bangladesh Civil Service jobs (2025)
1. Merit-based (93.0%)
2. Descendants of freedom fighters (5.00%)
3. Minority ethnic groups (1.00%)
4. Disabled and third genders (1.00%)

While all applicants must pass preliminary and written examinations, quotas are applied during the final stage of recruitment, particularly in the viva voce (oral interview).

Functioning as a form of affirmative action, the quota system aims to improve representation for historically marginalized or underprivileged communities. By 2010, as freedom fighters were aging out of the workforce, eligibility was extended to include not only children but also grandchildren of freedom fighters, while also expanding to 44 percent of the jobs for merit-based candidates.

However, from the 35th to 40th BCS examinations, many reserved posts went unfilled due to a shortage of qualified candidates, while a majority of successful applicants (around 65%) were recruited on merit, despite only 44% of the positions being allocated for merit-based selection.

The system has been a consistent focus of national controversy and protest, giving rise to the quota reform movements, which unfolded in three major phases. The first phase occurred in 2013, followed by a second and more widespread phase in 2018, which prompted the government to announce the abolition of the quota system for first and second class public service posts.

In 2024, a third and final phase of the movement emerged after the High Court Division ruled that the 2018 abolition lacked legal standing and ordered the reinstatement of the quota policy.

The High Court verdict was subsequently stayed by the Appellate Division as the Government of Bangladesh challenged the ruling. On 21 July 2024, the Supreme Court of Bangladesh issued a decision reducing the scope of quotas, thereby raising the merit-based recruitment share to 93% of available positions.

== History ==
Bangladesh Civil Service traces its origins to the Civil Service of Pakistan which was based on the Indian Civil Service of the British Raj. After the independence of Bangladesh, the Awami League government under president Sheikh Mujibur Rahman established a quota for the Bangladesh Civil Service through an order of the Ministry of Cabinet Services. Professor Muzaffar Ahmed Chowdhury, vice-chancellor of the University of Dhaka, opposed the move and called for merit-based recruitment. The government gave a 30 percent quota to veterans of the Bangladesh Liberation War, referred to as freedom fighters, 10 percent to women who were raped during the war, and 40 percent reserved to residents of underrepresented districts. This left 20 percent of the jobs for merit-based candidates.

Rahman was assassinated in 1975, and BAKSAL was removed from power. In 1976, the government of Bangladesh reduced the quota for people from underrepresented districts to 20 percent which increased jobs for merit-based candidates to 40 percent. As the jobs for women who were raped during the war were unclaimed, the quota was changed to include all women in 1985. The district-based quota was reduced to 10 percent. The government created a new five percent quota for indigenous communities of Bangladesh. This change in 1985 increased the merit-based jobs to 45 percent.

By 1997, 26 years after the Bangladesh Liberation War, freedom fighter recruitment decreased due to age and in response, the government of Bangladesh extended the quota to children of freedom fighters.

In 2008, Akbar Ali Khan, former civil servant and freedom fighter, and Kazi Rakibuddin Ahmad, civil servant, provided Dr. Saadat Hossain, chairman of the Bangladesh Public Service Commission, a report on the quota system essentially describing it as a flawed system and calling for reforms. The report stated without reforms doubts would be raised on the qualification of recruits under the Bangladesh Civil Service Examination.

In 2010, the government of Bangladesh further extended the quota for freedom fighters to include their grandchildren. Bangladesh Public Service Commission added a one percent quota for disabled candidates in 2012. This decision decreased the merit-based jobs to 44 percent. Despite the 30 percent quota for children and grandchildren of freedom fighters, recruitment in that category never exceeded 10 percent.

On 8 March 2018, the Bangladesh High Court rejected a petition challenging the legality of the quota system. Prime Minister Sheikh Hasina stated on 21 March she intended to keep the quota for descendants of freedom fighters. Bangladeshi students protested against the quota. Hasina issued an executive order removing all quotas from the Bangladesh Civil Service. The protestors were demanding a reformation of the quota, not an abolition. On 1 July 2020, the decision to abolish quota became effective.

A descendant of a freedom fighter and six others appealed the verdict in 2021 to challenge the government order canceling the quota system. The government filed an appeal with the Appellate Division, Supreme Court of Bangladesh. On 5 June 2024, the Bangladesh High Court issued a verdict that canceled the government notification, declaring it illegal, thus restoring the quota in Bangladesh Civil Service recruitment. The students of public and private universities and colleges in Bangladesh launched the 2024 Bangladesh quota reform movement. The Appellate Division issued an order of status quo which halts the High Court verdict till the Appellate Division finishes its hearing on the government appeal. Pro-government Bangladesh Chhatra League and police injured four hundred protesting students. The protests took place in the backdrop of rising unemployment levels in Bangladesh. The protestors called themselves Anti-discrimination Students Movement.

On 21 July 2024, Supreme Court of Bangladesh increased recruitment to government jobs based on merit to 93%, while reducing the quota for freedom fighters and their descendants to 5%, 1% for ethnic minorities and 1% for the third gender and disabled.

== Distribution ==
Distribution of quotas in the Bangladesh Civil Service
Group	Quota percentage	Year added/modified	Description	Reference
Merit-Based	93%	1972, 1985, 2024	Jobs based solely on merit.	
Descendants of Freedom Fighters	5%	1972, 1997, 2010, 2024	Reserved for descendants of those who fought in the 1971 Bangladesh Liberation War.	
Ethnic Minorities	1%	1985, 2024	Reserved for indigenous communities and other ethnic minorities.	
Third Gender and the physically disabled	1%	2024	Reserved for third gender candidates and the physically disabled.	
Women	0%	1972, 1985, 2024	Initially for women victimized in the war, later extended to all women. Removed in 2024.	
Underrepresented Districts (Zila Quota)	0%	1972, 1976, 1985, 2024	Reserved for candidates from less developed districts. Removed in 2024.	

== See also ==
- Reservation in India
- Quota system in Pakistan
