= 2024 Bangladesh quota reform case =

Constitutional case on public service quotas

- Court: Supreme Court of Bangladesh
- Full case name: Ohidul Islam and others v. The Government of Bangladesh and others
- Submitted: December 6, 2021 (Rule nisi issued)
- Decided: June 5, 2024; July 21, 2024
- Verdict: High Court Division (June 5, 2024) 2018 quota removal invalid.; Appellate Division (July 21, 2024) Overturned HC; set 93% merit, 7% quota (5% FF, 1% minorities, 1% disabled/third gender).
- Prosecution: Sk. Shaifuzzaman (Deputy Attorney General); Rehana Sultana; Ashique Rubaiat; Md. Samiul Alam Sarkar; Zulfia Akhter
- Defense: Munsurul Hoque Chowdhury; Md. Shafikul Islam Ripon
- Citation: Writ Petition No. 6063 of 2021
- Legislation cited: Constitution of Bangladesh §§ Article 28(4): Special provision for disadvantaged groups; Article 29(3): Quota for backward sections.

Case history
- Related action: Bangladesh v. Sheikh Hasina

Court membership
- Judges sitting: K. M. Kamrul Kader; Khizir Hayat

Ohidul Islam and Others v. The Government of Bangladesh and Others was a writ petition brought before the High Court Division of the Supreme Court of Bangladesh. The petition was filed after three years the Government of Bangladesh, amid the 2018 quota reform movement, had issued a circular setting aside the existing quotas for descendants of 1971 Liberation War veterans in certain government job. This writ petition challenged the constitutionality of the circular. Proceedings in this case became a significant factor in shaping the developments leading to the 2024 quota reform movement.

== Facts ==
During the 2018 quota reform movement, on October 4, 2018, the Government of Bangladesh issued a circular eliminating the freedom fighter quota in first- and second-class government jobs. Three years later, in 2021, Ohidul Islam Tushar, President of the "Muktijoddhader Sontan o Projonmo, Central Command Council" (lit. 'Children and generations of freedom fighters, Central Command Council') along with seven others, filed a writ petition in the High Court Division challenging this decision. On December 6, 2021, the High Court Division issued a ruling requiring an explanation as to why the 2018 circular canceling the freedom fighter quota in government employment should not be declared invalid.

== Judgment ==
On June 5, 2024, the High Court Division declared the circular regarding the cancellation of the freedom fighter quota for the posts of 9th grade (previously 1st class) and 10th-13th grade (previously 2nd class) in direct recruitment to government offices, autonomous or semi-autonomous institutions and various corporations invalid. After the final hearing of the writ, the High Court Division bench consisting of Justice KM Kamrul Quader and Justice Khizir Hayat passed the verdict declaring the previously issued rule as Rule Absolute.

On June 9, the state appealed to the Chamber Court of the Appellate Division seeking to suspend the judgment given by the High Court Division. The Chamber court on the same day decided July 4 as the date for hearing of the aforementioned petition before the full bench of the Appellate Division.

On July 4, the hearing of the state party's application seeking stay of the judgment given by the High Court Division was adjourned. When the writ petitioner appealed for time, the Appellate Division ordered 'not today'. The six-member Appellate Division headed by the then Chief Justice Obaidul Hassan gave this order. In effect, the judgment of the High Court Division remains in force until further orders. Besides, the state party was asked to file a regular leave to appeal after publication of the full text of the judgment.

Later on July 10, at the point of the application of two students of University of Dhaka to be a part of the case under trial in the Appellate Division, the Appellate Division issued an order to impose a status quo for four weeks on the judgment of the High Court along with some observations and instructions. On this day, the next date of hearing was also fixed on August 7.

In a full judgment released on July 14, the High Court justified the provision of 30 percent quota for their children in government jobs citing freedom fighters as a backward section of the society.

On July 16, a leave to appeal was filed by the state. On the context of the government's direction, on July 18, based on the application of Attorney General AM Amin Uddin, the Supreme Court's Chamber Court Judge M Enayetur Rahim of the Appellate Division fixed the date of hearing the case on July 21.

On July 21, the Appellate Division reinstated the quota and quashed the judgment given by the High Court Division. At the same time, even though it is a matter of policy decision of the government, under the jurisdiction enshrined in Article 104 of the Constitution and in the interest of complete justice in the overall and logical consideration, the court ordered 93 percent recruitment in government jobs on the basis of merit. It was also directed to appoint the other 7 percent on the basis of quota. According to the direction of the court, 5 percent quota should be reserved for the children and grandchildren of freedom fighters, martyred freedom fighters and Birangonas, 1 percent for minority ethnic groups and 1 percent for disabled and third gender.

== Significance ==
Following the announcement of the verdict in this case on June 5, general students in Dhaka University protested that evening against the reinstatement of the quota system in government jobs. On June 6, the second day of protest was also held in Dhaka University. For several days, students of University of Chittagong, University of Rajshahi, Jahangirnagar University and different universities across the country held protests, rallies and human chains along with students of University of Dhaka. On June 9, the students gave an ultimatum for a nationwide movement if the Freedom Fighter quota is not canceled by June 30 from a protest rally at the Dhaka University campus. Thus, the context of the quota reform movement was initiated in the country for the third time.

Following the application of the state seeking a stay of the High Court verdict on June 9, on June 10, the agitators gave the government a time-frame until June 30 to accept their demands and announced a break in the agitation due to Eid-al-Adha. The agitation resumed on June 30. On July 1, Students of University of Dhaka protested and announced a three-day program. On this day, students of Jahangirnagar University blocked the Dhaka-Aricha highway and students of Chittagong University took a position in front of the central Shaheed MInar of the university.

The Students Against Discrimination made its first appearance on July 1 following the various programs of the series of movements. The students agitating under the banner of this organization held demonstrations, human chains, highway blockades, etc. in various parts of the country. Despite Bangladesh Police as well as Awami League, Chhatra League and their other supporting organizations carried out massacres against the protesters for a month and imposed curfew by deploying the army, Sheikh Hasina's government failed to suppress the movement. When the movement eventually turned into a non-cooperation movement, Sheikh Hasina resigned and fled to India on August 5 and Sheikh Hasina's government fell.

== See also ==
- Secretary, Ministry of Finance v. Masdar Hossain
