= Mohammad Nazmuzzaman Bhuian =

Bangladeshi academic and legal scholar

- মোহাম্মদ নাজমুজ্জামান ভূঁইয়া

Chairman of the Bangladesh Public Service Commission
- Incumbent
- Assumed office 6 September 2026
- Appointed by: Mirza Fakhrul Islam Alamgir
- Preceded by: Mobasser Monem

Personal details
- Education: School of Oriental and African Studies (PhD)
- Occupation: Academic, Legal scholar

Mohammad Nazmuzzaman Bhuian is a Bangladeshi legal scholar. He is a professor in the Department of Law at the University of Dhaka and the current chairman of the Bangladesh Public Service Commission.

== Education ==
Bhuian obtained a master's degree in law in 1999. He subsequently received a Commonwealth Scholarship and earned a PhD from the School of Oriental and African Studies, University of London, in 2012.

== Career ==
Mohammad Nazmuzzaman Bhuian began his academic career as a lecturer at American International University-Bangladesh in 2002. In 2003, he joined the Department of Law at the University of Dhaka as a lecturer. He was promoted to assistant professor in 2006, associate professor in 2012, and professor in 2018. He has served in various academic and administrative roles at the University of Dhaka, including as a house tutor of a residential hall, departmental student adviser, and moderator of the Dhaka University Moot Court Society.

In addition to the University of Dhaka, he has served as a professor and dean of the Department of Law at Independent University, Bangladesh and as an adviser to the Department of Law at Canadian University of Bangladesh. He is affiliated with several national and international professional organizations. He has served as a member of the Executive Council of the Asian Society of International Law and as vice-president of its Bangladesh Chapter.

On 2 September 2026, Bhuian was appointed chairman of the Bangladesh Public Service Commission. He formally assumed office on 6 September.
