= Chummery House =

Historic house in Dhaka, Bangladesh

Coordinates: 23.7293°N 90.4054°E

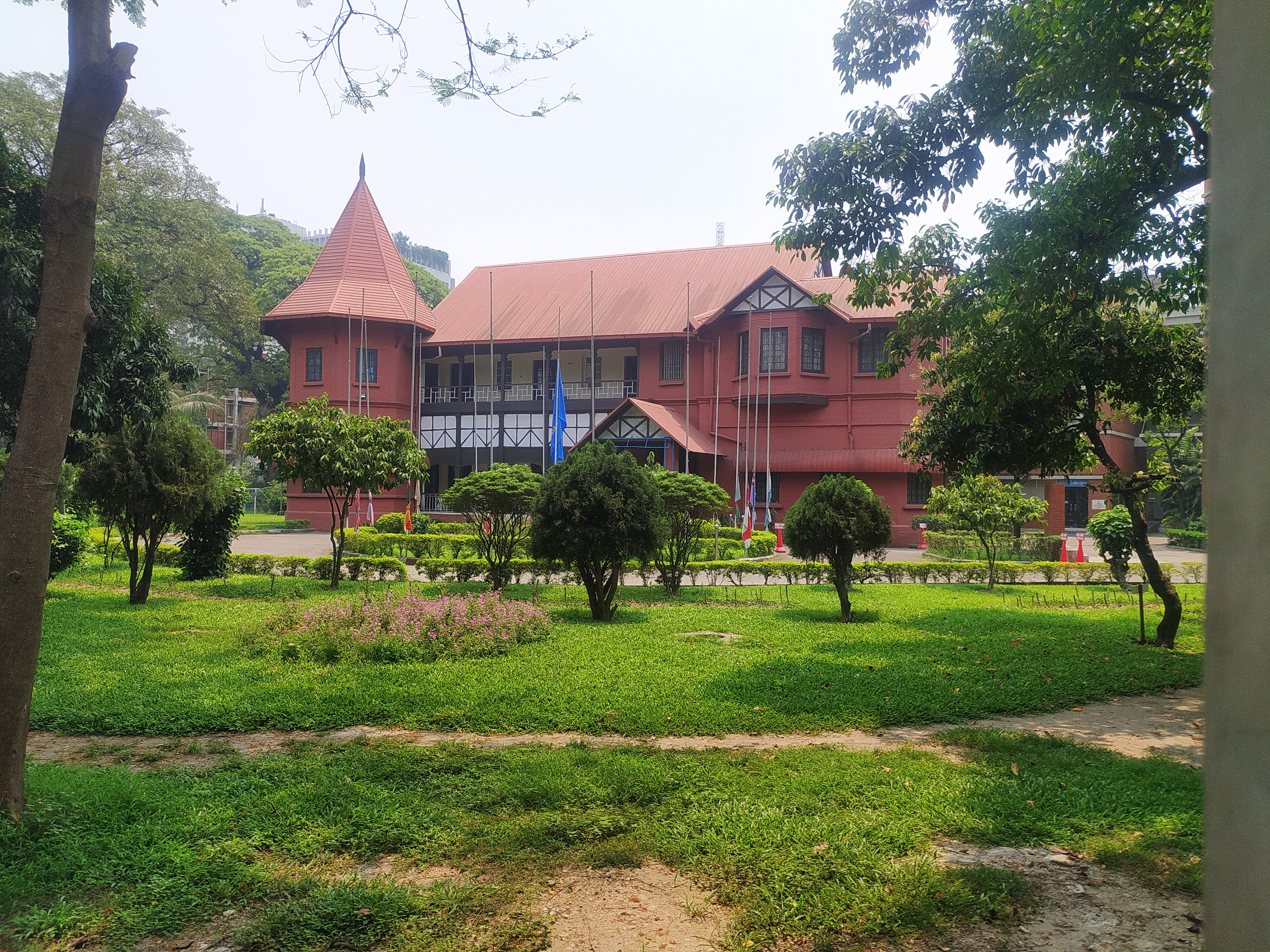
- Interactive map of Chummery House
- Location: Dhaka, Bangladesh

Chummery House is a historical colonial house in Dhaka, Bangladesh and the present office of Centre on Integrated Rural Development for Asia and the Pacific (CIRDAP).

== History ==
The Chummery house or Chamerli house was built in Dhaka in 1920 during the British Raj. The building was located opposite the Dhaka High Court. The house was originally built as houses for single British officials based in Dhaka. Since then the building has been a women's dormitory of Dhaka University, later being used as the headquarters of the Bangladesh Public Service Commission. The building was finally handed over to the Centre for Integrated Rural Development of Asia and the Pacific in 1985 and was subsequently known as the CIRDAP House.
