= Habibul Awal Commission =

- Government notification regarding commission
- Formation: February 26, 2022; 4 years ago
- Dissolved: September 5, 2024; 2 years ago
- Type: Government
- Headquarters: Dhaka
- Region served: Bangladesh
- Members: 5
- Chief Election Commissioner: Kazi Habibul Awal
- Election Commissioner: Md. Alamgir; Anisur Rahman; Rashida Sultana Emily; Ahsan Habib Khan
- Affiliations: President of Bangladesh
- Website: www.ecs.gov.bd

Habibul Awal Commission is the thirteenth election commission of Bangladesh. President Mohammad Abdul Hamid formed this commission on February 26 based on the recommendations of the 2022 Search Committee. Chief Election Commissioner Kazi Habibul Awal includes 5 members of this commission. The next Bangladeshi general election will be held under this commission. According to the constitution of Bangladesh, the term of this commission is 5 years.

The commission resigned on 5 September 2024.
