= Centre on Integrated Rural Development for Asia and the Pacific =

Bangladesh-based intergovernmental organization

- Abbreviation: CIRDAP
- Established: July 6, 1979; 47 years ago
- Type: Intergovernmental organization
- Headquarters: Chummery House, Bangladesh
- Director General: Dr. P Chandra Shekera
- Website: cirdap.org

Centre on Integrated Rural Development for Asia and the Pacific (CIRDAP) is a Bangladesh-based intergovernmental organization involved in rural development and poverty alleviation. It was established on 6 July 1979 at the initiative of the countries of the Asia-Pacific region and the Food and Agriculture Organization (FAO) of the United Nations with support from several other UN bodies and donors. Initially, it had six member countries and the number has since grown to fifteen countries.

The agency is headquartered in Chummery House, Dhaka, a British Raj-era two-storied mansion, in front of the Supreme Court of Bangladesh and Ministry of Foreign Affairs. The current Director-General (DG) of CIRDAP is Dr. P Chandra Shekara from India.

== Members ==
- Afghanistan
- Bangladesh (Host State)
- India
- Indonesia
- Iran
- Laos
- Malaysia
- Myanmar
- Nepal
- Pakistan
- Philippines
- Sri Lanka
- Thailand
- Vietnam
- Fiji (Joined as 15th member in June 2010)
- FAO (Food and Agriculture Organization) - Member Organization.

== Meeting developments ==
- First Ministerial Meeting was held in 1987
- Second Ministerial Meeting on Rural Development in Asia and the Pacific was held 24–28 January 2010 in Dhaka

== Events ==
1. Regional Cooperation Crucial for Watershed Management, Seminar on CIRDAP's 31st Foundation Day, Dhaka, 6 July 2010.
2. Second Ministerial Meeting on Rural Development in Asia and the Pacific, 27–28 January 2010, Dhaka
3. Seventeenth Regular Meeting of the CIRDAP Governing Council (GC-17), 25 January 2010, Dhaka
4. Twenty-Seventh Regular Meeting of the CIRDAP Executive Committee (EC-27), 24 January 2010, Dhaka
5. Fourth Regional Policy Dialogue on Sustainable Rural Livelihoods, 26 January 2010, CIRDAP, Dhaka
6. Initiation of the ICT Centre at the CIRDAP International Conference (ICC), 26 January 2010, CIRDAP, Dhaka
7. Training-cum-Exposure visit on Micro-Finance in Bangladesh for Indian Officials, 05-12 February 2010 (STST.56), Dhaka
8. Twenty Fifth Meeting of CIRDAP Technical Committee (TC-25), 26–29 July 2009, Tehran, Islamic Republic of Iran
9. Policy Dialogue on Success Story of Malaysia on Rural Transformation and Poverty Reduction, 27–30, April 2009, Langkawi, Malaysia.
10. Ministerial Retreat for Rural Development Ministers of CIRDAP Member Countries

== Objective ==
- To assist national action and promote regional co-operation relating to Integrated Rural Development (IRD) in the region
- To act as a servicing institution for its member states
- To encourage joint collective activities to benefit the member countries both individually and collectively
- To alleviate poverty through people's participation in the development process.

== Publishing ==
CIRDAP's flagship publication is the Asia-Pacific Journal of Rural Development (APJORD) which addresses issues in rural development across the region.
