= Mobasser Monem =

Bangladeshi academic and public administrator

- মোবাশ্বের মোনেম
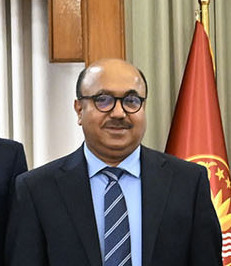
- Monem in 2025

Chairman of the Bangladesh Public Service Commission
- In office 15 October 2024 – 18 August 2026
- Appointed by: President of Bangladesh
- President: Mohammed Shahabuddin; Hafiz Uddin Ahmad (acting)
- Preceded by: Md Sohorab Hossain
- Succeeded by: Mohammad Nazmuzzaman Bhuian

Personal details
- Education: University of Dhaka (BSS); University of Antwerp (PGD, MSS); University of London (PhD)
- Occupation: Academic, Public administrator

Mobasser Monem is a Bangladeshi public administration expert. He is a professor in the Department of Public Administration at the University of Dhaka and former chairman of the Bangladesh Public Service Commission.

== Education ==
Monem completed his secondary education at Dhanmondi Govt. Boys' High School and higher secondary education at Dhaka College. He completed his undergraduate degree in Public Administration from the University of Dhaka in 1986. He earned a Postgraduate Diploma in Development Policy in 1991 and a master's degree in Public Administration and Management in 1992 from the University of Antwerp, Belgium. In 1999, he obtained a Ph.D. in Public Management from the University of London, UK. Additionally, he conducted postdoctoral research at the University of Sussex, UK, and Heidelberg University, Germany.

== Career ==
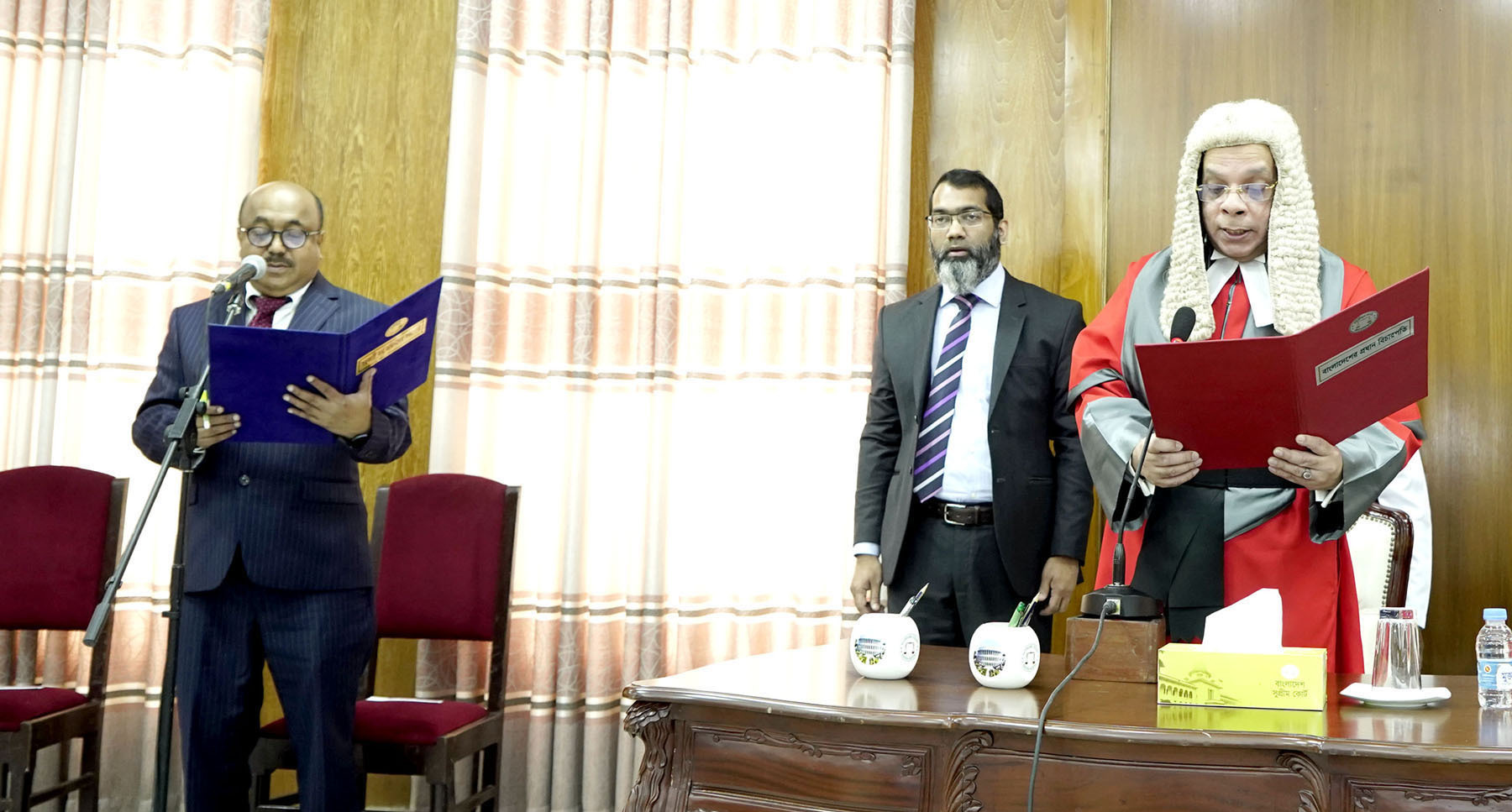
Chief Justice Syed Refat Ahmed administered the oath of office to the newly appointed Chairman of the Bangladesh Public Service Commission Mobasser Monem

Mobasser Monem is a professor in the Department of Public Administration at the University of Dhaka. He has also served as a visiting professor at Korea University, South Korea, where he taught Public Management and Policy. His research interests include governance, innovation in the public sector, and comparative public policy. He has worked as a consultant for various international organizations and played a significant role in managing public sector affairs in Bangladesh. His scholarly work has been published in numerous international journals, and he has authored two books. On 9 October 2024, he was appointed as the chairman of the Bangladesh Public Service Commission and assumed office on 15 October 2024.
