= Md Sohorab Hossain =

Bangladeshi civil servant

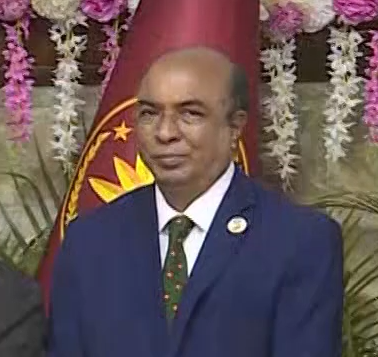

14th Chairman of Bangladesh Public Service Commission
- In office 21 September 2020 – 8 October 2024
- Appointed by: President of Bangladesh
- President: Mohammad Abdul Hamid; Mohammed Shahabuddin
- Preceded by: Mohammad Sadique
- Succeeded by: Mobasser Monem

Senior Secretary Ministry of Education
- In office 6 December 2016 – 31 December 2019
- Prime Minister: Sheikh Hasina
- Minister: Nurul Islam Nahid
- Preceded by: Nazrul Islam Khan
- Succeeded by: Md. Mahbub Hossain

Personal details
- Born: 1 January 1961 (age 65) Noakhali District, Bangladesh
- Spouse: Mahmuda Yasmin
- Children: 1
- Education: St. Joseph Higher Secondary School; University of Dhaka
- Profession: Government official

Md Sohorab Hossain is a retired Bangladeshi civil servant and served as the chairman of the Bangladesh Public Service Commission. He is a former senior secretary of the Ministry of Education.

== Early life ==
Hossain was born in 1961 in Chatkhil Upazila, Noakhali District, East Pakistan, Pakistan. He passed SSC from St. Joseph Higher Secondary School. He completed his bachelor's degree and master's in Bengali language and literature from the University of Dhaka.

== Career ==
Hossain joined the admin cadre of Bangladesh Civil Service in 1984 and after training started working as an assistant commissioner in 1986. He took Military Orientation Training Course at Bangladesh Military Academy in Bhatiary.

Hossain was appointed the secretary of the Secondary and Higher Education Division on 6 December 2016.

In May 2018, Hossain chaired a meeting of the National Curriculum Coordination Committee.

He later served as the secretary at the Ministry of Education and retired on 31 December 2019.

Hossain served as the Bangladesh Civil Service (Admin) Academy as its rector.

In September 2020, Hossain was appointed the chairman of the Bangladesh Public Service Commission for a five-year term. He replaced Mohammad Sadique as chairman of the Bangladesh Public Service Commission.

In February 2022, Hossain served as a member of the Election Commission Search Committee.

== Personal life ==
Hossain is married to Mahmuda Yasmin, a professor of the University of Dhaka. The couple has a daughter.
