= Ikram Ahmed =

Bangladeshi civil servant

- ইকরাম আহমেদ

12th Chairman of Bangladesh Public Service Commission
- In office 24 December 2013 – 13 April 2016
- Appointed by: Mohammad Abdul Hamid
- President: Mohammad Abdul Hamid
- Preceded by: A. T. Ahmedul Huq Chowdhury
- Succeeded by: Mohammad Sadique

Personal details
- Born: 14 April 1951 (age 75)

Ikram Ahmed (born 14 April 1951) is a retired civil servant and former chairperson of the Bangladesh Public Service Commission.

== Early life ==
Ahmed was born on 14 April 1951.

== Career ==
In 2008, Ahmed was the divisional commissioner of Dhaka Division. He is the convener of the Families United against Road Accident.

Ahmed was appointed chairperson of the Bangladesh Public Service Commission in December 2013. He replaced A. T. Ahmedul Huq Chowdhury as chairperson of the Bangladesh Public Service Commission. During his term the 34th Bangladesh Civil Service exam was delayed over a legal case filed by tribal applicants whose names were dropped from passing applicant after removal of quota.

In April 2016, Ahmed was replaced by Mohammad Sadique as chairperson of the Bangladesh Public Service Commission.

In February 2022, Ahmed's name was proposed for the post of commissioner of the Bangladesh Election Commission by the Ganatantri Party.
