= A. T. Ahmedul Huq Chowdhury =

- এ. টি. আহমেদুল হক চৌধুরী

11th Chairman of Bangladesh Public Service Commission
- In office 27 November 2011 – 20 December 2013
- Appointed by: Zillur Rahman
- President: Zillur Rahman; Mohammad Abdul Hamid
- Preceded by: Saadat Husain
- Succeeded by: Ikram Ahmed

A. T. Ahmedul Huq Chowdhury is a former chairperson of Bangladesh Public Service Commission. He is a retired additional inspector general of Bangladesh Police.

== Career ==
In November 2001, Chowdhury was the chief of the Criminal Investigation Department. On 13 November 2001, he was made an officer on special duty and removed from his post after the Bangladesh Nationalist Party government came to power replacing the Awami League government.

Chowdhury joined the Public Service Commission on 23 June 2009. He had been serving in Bangladesh Police as an additional inspector general.

Chowdhury was appointed chairman of the Bangladesh Public Service Commission in November 2011. During his tenure, the commission canceled results of the 34th Bangladesh Civil Service preliminary exam and announced a new result without the usage of quota. This faced criticism from the indigenous communities whose candidates names were dropped from the revised list. In January 2012, he served in the search committee for the Bangladesh Election Commission. The search committee appointed Kazi Rakibuddin Ahmad Chief Election Commissioner of Bangladesh.

In December 2013, Ikram Ahmed succeeded Chowdhury as chairman of the Bangladesh Public Service Commission.

Chowdhury is a trustee board member of Hamdard Laboratories (WAQF) Bangladesh. He is the chairperson of the disciplinary committee of Hamdard University Bangladesh.
