= S. M. Al-Husainy =

S. M. Al-Husainy was a Bangladeshi engineer and public administrator. He served as secretary to the Government of Bangladesh, president of the Institution of Engineers, Bangladesh, and chairman of the board of Management and Development International Services Limited (MIDAS). He was one of the founders of Independent University, Bangladesh. He was the Chairman of Swanirvar Bangladesh.

== Early life ==
Al-Husainy was born in 1930 at the Rupsha deowanji Bari in Rupsa village, located in the Faridganj upazila of Chandpur district. . He studied physics and electrical engineering at the University of Calcutta.

== Career ==
Al-Husainy began his public service career with the Government of East Pakistan in 1950. He served as general manager of the East Pakistan Water and Power Development Authority (EPWAPDA), where he contributed to the development of the region's power infrastructure. During his tenure, electricity generation capacity reached 500 megawatts. He was awarded the Tamgha-e-Quaid-e-Azam in 1963 and the Sitara-e-Khidmat in 1969.

After the independence of Bangladesh, Al-Husainy was appointed secretary to the Government of Bangladesh in 1972. He was the Secretary, Ministry of Power in 1973. He served on the board of directors of Bangladesh Bank and held leadership positions at Biman Bangladesh Airlines, Bangladesh Shilpa Bank, Bangladesh Shilpa Rin Sangstha, and the Industrial Promotion and Development Company of Bangladesh. He was the founding chairman of Saudi-Bangladesh Industrial and Agricultural Investment Company Limited and managing director of Bangladesh Krishi Bank.

Al-Husainy served two terms as president of the Institution of Engineers, Bangladesh (IEB) and received the IEB Gold Medal. His expertise was sought by international organisations, including the Asian Development Bank, the World Bank, the United Nations Development Programme, the United Nations Children's Fund and the United Nations Educational, Scientific and Cultural Organization. He served as chairmen of the Bangladesh Public Service Commission.

In August 2013, the Department of Social Services suspended the executive committee of Swanirvar Bangladesh over allegations of financial corruption and misappropriation of public funds against its chairman, Al-Husainy. He challenged the government order before the Bangladesh High Court, denying allegations of corruption and irregularities. On 26 August 2013, Justice Md Habibul Gani and Justice Muhammad Khurshid Alam Sarkar of the High Court Division stayed the suspension for three months and directed the government to explain within four weeks why the order should not be declared illegal.

Al-Husainy was a founding trustee of the Foundation for Education, Science and Technology Development, which was associated with the establishment of Independent University, Bangladesh. He served as the university's first chairman of the governing council. He also chaired MIDAS and Chittagong Independent University. He served as vice-president of the National Executive Council of the National Heart Foundation of Bangladesh. His contributions to social service were recognised with the Ahsania Gold Medal.

== Death ==
Al-Husainy died on 28 May 2025.
