= A. Q. M. Bazlul Karim =

Bangladeshi educationist and soil scientist (1920–1998)

- এ. কিউ. এম. বজলুল করিম

1st Chairman of Bangladesh Public Service Commission
- In office 15 May 1972 – 14 December 1977
- Appointed by: Abu Sayeed Chowdhury
- President: Abu Sayeed Chowdhury; Mohammad Mohammadullah; Sheikh Mujibur Rahman; Khondaker Mostaq Ahmad; Abu Sadat Mohammad Sayem; Ziaur Rahman
- Preceded by: Office established
- Succeeded by: Mohiuddin Ahmed

Personal details
- Born: 1 February 1920 Kalma village, Lohajang Upazila, Munshiganj District, Bengal Presidency, British India
- Died: 6 July 1998 (aged 78)
- Education: Ph.D.
- Alma mater: Imperial College London

AQM Bazlul Karim (1920–1998) was a Bangladeshi educationist and soil scientist.

== Early life and education ==
Karim was born on 1 February 1920 in Kalma village in Lohajang Upazila, Munshiganj District, Bengal Presidency, British India. He passed SSC, and HSC in 1936 and 1938, respectively. He completed his BSc examinations in 1940. He did his MSc degree in 1942 from Aligarh Muslim University in chemistry.

In 1945, he started his PhD in agricultural chemistry at Imperial College London and finished in 1948. His thesis was Residual effect of fertilisers on the growth and yield of potatoes.

== Career ==
Karim became a civil servant in Calcutta under the Bengal Ministry of Food. He joined Jadabpur College as a lecturer. He was appointed a gazetted officer in the chemical standardization laboratory of the Bengal Ministry of Food and Drug.

In 1949, Karim joined the Department of Soil Science in University of Dhaka as senior lecturer. He worked with M Osman Ghani and Abdul Karim. In 1952, he was appointed reader. He joined the Department of Soil Science and Botany in Davis Campus of the University of California, Barkley as a visiting faculty following an offer by American Academy of Sciences.

In 1961, Karim returned from the United States and was appointed head of the Soil Science Department of the University of Dhaka. In 1962, he was promoted to professor. From 1967 to 1969, he worked as director general of the Soil Survey of Pakistan project.

Karim was appointed the first chairman of the Bangladesh Public Service Commission after the Independence of Bangladesh in July 1972. He served a five-year term after which he returned to the University of Dhaka. He retired from the university on 30 June 1982.

== Awards ==
- President's Gold Medal (1974)
- Sher-e-Bangla Gold Medal (1982)
- Atish Dipankar Gold Medal (1984)
- Ekushey Padak (1999), posthumously.

== Personal life and death ==
Karim died on 6 September 1998.
