= Z. N. Tahmida Begum =

Bangladeshi botanist and professor

- জেড. এন. তাহমিদা বেগম

9th Chairman of Bangladesh Public Service Commission
- In office 9 May 2002 – 7 May 2007
- Appointed by: A. Q. M. Badruddoza Chowdhury
- President: A. Q. M. Badruddoza Chowdhury; Muhammad Jamiruddin Sircar; Iajuddin Ahmed
- Preceded by: Md. Mustafa Chowdhury
- Succeeded by: Saadat Husain

Personal details
- Born: 26 November 1945 (age 80) Rajshahi District, East Bengal, British India
- Children: Tahsan Rahman Khan (son)
- Education: University of Dhaka

Z. N. Tahmida Begum (Bengali: জিনাতুন নেসা তাহমিদা বেগম) is a botanist and former chairperson of Bangladesh Public Service Commission, the first woman chairperson of the commission. She was a professor of botany at the University of Dhaka.

== Early life ==
Begum was born on 26 November 1945 in Rajshahi District, East Bengal, British India. She completed her bachelor's degree and masters in botany from the University of Dhaka in 1966 and 1967 respectively. In 1977, she finished her PhD from the University of London. She completed her post doctoral research at the University of Nottingham.

== Personal life ==
Her son is former singer Tahsan Rahman Khan.

== Career ==
Begum has served as a Trustee Board member of Bangladesh National Museum from 1993 to 1995. She was a member of the Syndicate Board of the University of Dhaka from 1994 to 1996.

From 1999 to 2001, Begum served as the chairperson of the Department of Botany of the University of Dhaka.

From 2001 to 2002, Begum served as the pro vice-chancellor of the University of Dhaka. She was a member of the Syndicate Board of the University of Dhaka from 2004 to 2006.

Begum is a member of the editorial board of the Journal of Science Foundation, published by Bangladesh Science Foundation. She is a professor of botany at the University of Dhaka. She is the chief editor of Bangladesh Journal of Botany published by Bangladesh Botanical Society.

Begum faced allegation of corruption by Transparency International Bangladesh during her term as the chairperson of Bangladesh Public Service Commission. She organized a meeting on the matter on 25 March 2007 where Hafizur Rahman, law teacher at the University of Dhaka, called for a judicial investigation against her and the commission. The meeting ended chaotically following the demand for investigation. In 2005, her resignation was demanded following alleged leak of question papers of the 25th Bangladesh Civil Service exam. On 8 May 2007, she ended her term as chairperson and was replaced by Saadat Husain. She had recommended canceling the quota system in the Bangladesh Civil Service to the President of Bangladesh.

Begum is a fellow of the Bangladesh Academy of Sciences. She is a member of the Bangladesh Society of Microbiologists.

In June 2018, Begum participated in a protest calling for the release of former Prime Minister Khaleda Zia from prison organized by Shoto Nagarik.
