= Saadat Husain =

Bangladeshi civil servant (1946–2020)

- সাদাত হোসেন
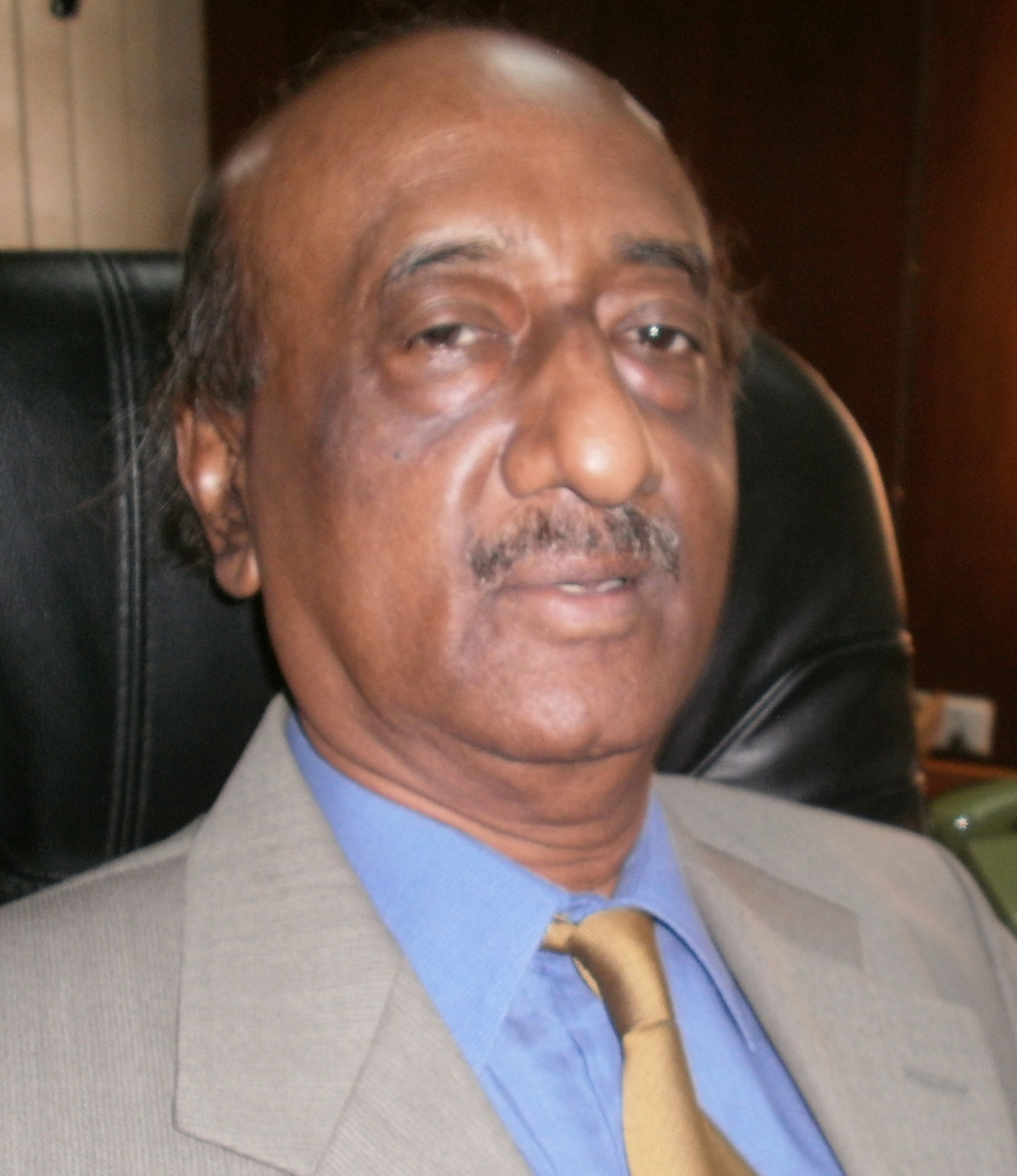

10th Chairman of Bangladesh Public Service Commission
- In office 9 May 2007 – 23 November 2011
- Appointed by: Iajuddin Ahmed
- President: Iajuddin Ahmed; Zillur Rahman
- Preceded by: Z. N. Tahomida Begum
- Succeeded by: A. T Ahmedul Huq Choudhury

Personal details
- Born: 24 November 1946 Noakhali District, British Raj (now Bangladesh)
- Died: 22 April 2020 (aged 73) Dhaka, Bangladesh
- Spouse: Shahana Chowdhury
- Education: Dhaka University; Boston University

Sadat Hussain (24 November 1946 – 22 April 2020) was a Bangladeshi bureaucrat and the 9th chairman of the Bangladesh Public Service Commission, one of the country's leading constitutional bodies. He also served as the chief of the Bangladesh Civil Service and as the cabinet secretary to the government of Bangladesh.

== Early life ==
Sadat Hussain was born on 24 November 1946 in the Noakhali district. He studied economics at Dhaka University. He earned a PhD in economics from Boston University in the United States. He had one son – Shahzad Sa'adat, and two daughters.

== Career ==
At the end of Husain's educational career, he passed the competitive examination in 1970 and joined the Civil Service of Pakistan (CSP). The War of Liberation in 1971 started while he was working as a teaching officer in Narail. He left for India in April and joined the expatriate Bangladesh government. His book "Muktijuddher din dinanto (Days of the War of Liberation)" based on his experience of the War of Liberation was published by Maula Brothers in 2012.

He retired from the Bangladesh Civil Service while serving as the Cabinet Secretary for the period of 2002–2005. He was appointed chairman of the Bangladesh Public Service Commission in 2007 and held the post till 2011. He held various important posts including the post of chairman of the National Board of Revenue. Towards the end of his career, he was promoted to cabinet secretary.

Hussain served as the country's civil service recruitment provider to the authorities Bangladesh Public Service and the commission's 9th chairman. Therein following the retirement of Jinatun Nessa Tahmina Begum, he took over as chairman on 9 May 2007, and held the office until 23 November 2011

== Death ==
Hussein died on 22 April 2020, at the age of 73. He was suffering from high blood pressure, diabetes and other ailments. He was admitted to the United Hospital in Dhaka on 13 April when he fell ill.
