= Bangladesh quota reform movement =

Overview of the students' movements demanding reforms in Bangladesh quota system

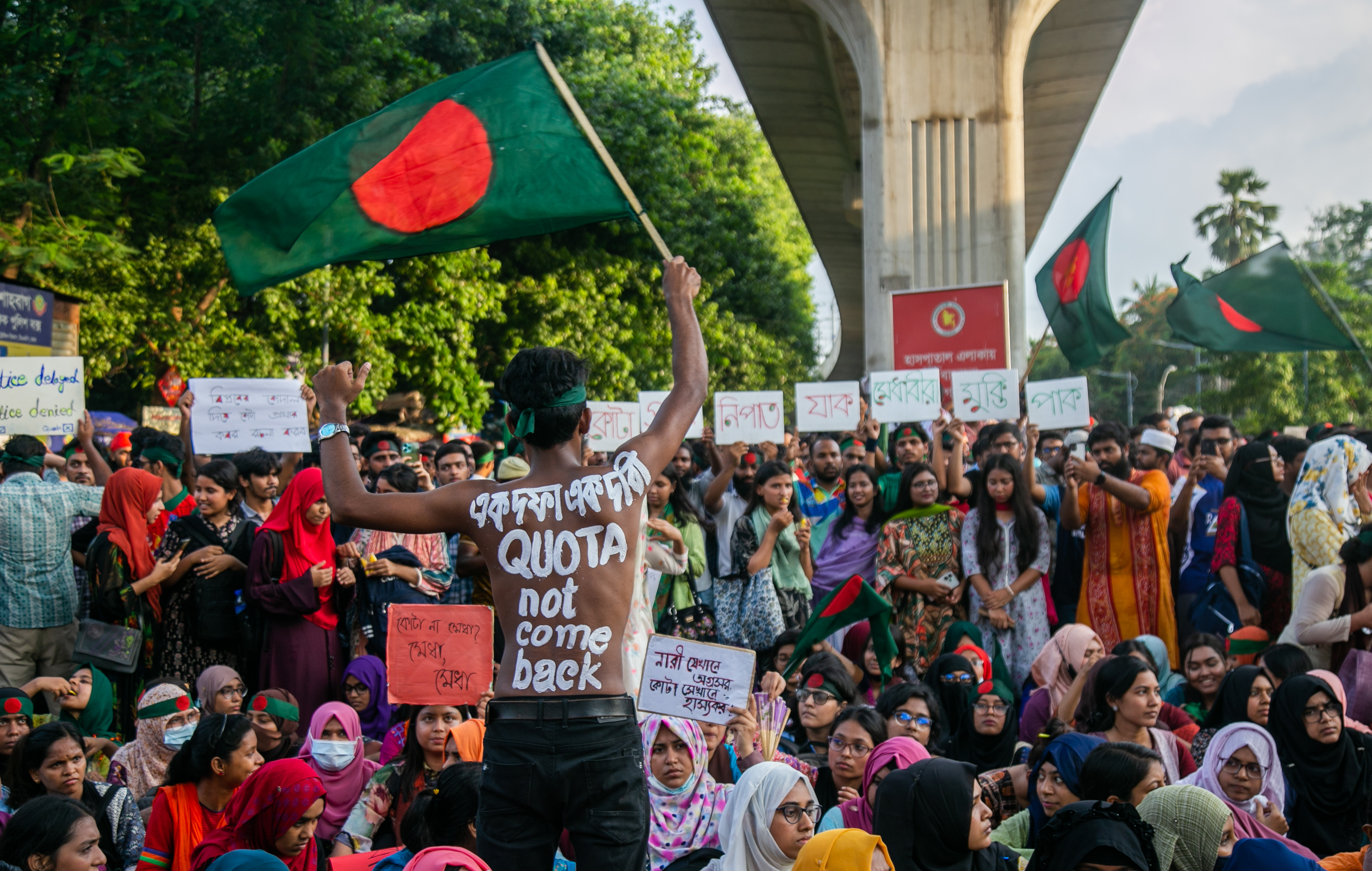
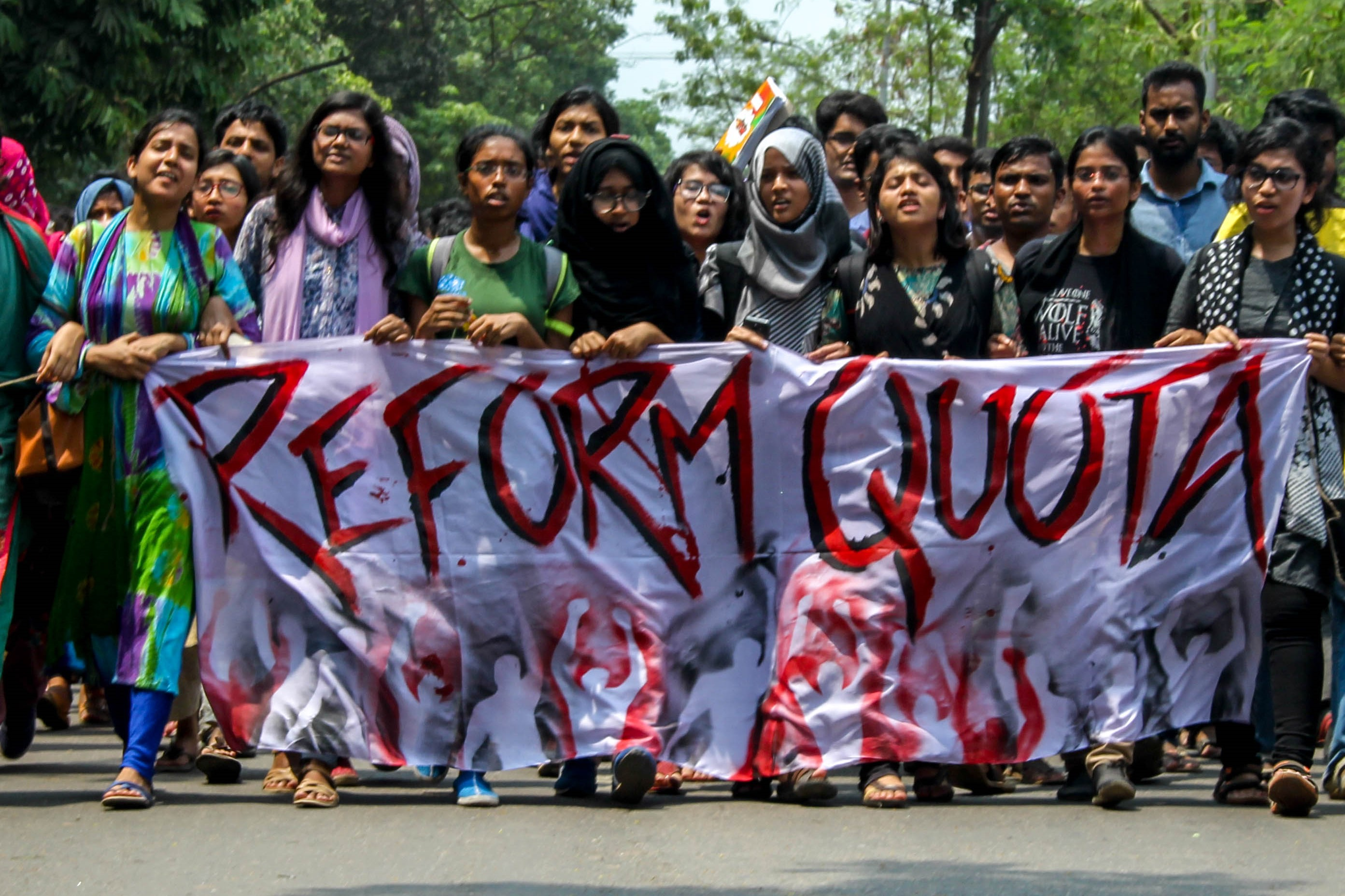
- A protester in the 2024 movement carrying the Bangladeshi flag with the slogan "One point one demand, Quota not come back" written on his body. A rally of female student protesters in BUET during the 2018 movement, with the protest sign written "Reform Quota".
- Date: First phase: 6 June – 18 July 2013; Second phase: 17 February – 18 July 2018; Third phase: 6 June – 3 August 2024
- Location: Bangladesh and abroad
- Caused by: First and Second Phase: Quota system of Bangladesh Civil Service; Third Phase: Reinstating of the pre-2018 quota system
- Goals: Reduction of quotas in public sector jobs and education for a merit-based system
- Methods: Protests; Sit-ins; Public demonstrations; Traffic obstruction; Picketing; Sitdown strikes; Occupation; Rail obstruction; Internet activism; Lawsuits; Civil strife; Riots; Arson; Vandalism; Remittance boycott
- Result: First Phase: Unsuccessful; Second Phase: The government issued a circular reducing reserved quotas for government jobs from 56% to 35% and eliminating the freedom fighters' quota. Third Phase: The Appellate Division of Supreme Court orders 93% recruitment in government jobs to be based on merit and 5% to be reserved for the children of freedom fighters, martyred freedom fighters and Biranganas, 1% for the ethnic minorities and 1% for the third gender and the disabled people, with the public administration ministry publishing a gazette notification in line with the Supreme Court verdict.

Casualties
- Deaths: First phase: 55+ injured and 50+ arrested Second phase: Approx 262 injuries and 44 arrested Third phase: Deaths: 1,650 anti-quota protesters (MoHFW estimates) and 2 JCD activists; Injuries: 22,000 people (including anti-quota protesters, children and non-protester civilians); Arrests: 12,000+

The quota reform movement in Bangladesh was organized to demand a reduction in government job quotas and shift toward merit-based recruitment. There were three significant protests. The first occurred in 2013, when university students opposed the disproportionate allocation of jobs through quotas. In 2018, a second wave of protests led to a government circular favoring the protesters, but it was later invalidated by the Supreme Court. This sparked a third wave of protests in 2024, during which violent clashes between students, the police, and Chhatra League occurred, contributing to the movement turning into a non-cooperation campaign leading to the fall of the Hasina government.

== Background ==
Quota system was first introduced in 1972 after the independence of Bangladesh in government jobs. At that time, 20% of the merit list was allocated, 40% was district-wise, 30% was allotted to family members of freedom fighters who participated in the freedom struggle of Bangladesh, and 10% was allotted to war-affected women. This quota system was changed several times later.

Previously, Bangladesh has more than 55% quota in various government jobs, including 30% freedom fighter quota, 10% district-wise quota, 10% for women and 5% for minorities. However, as per the rules, if there are no qualified candidates in these quotas, 1% is allocated for the disabled. As a result, only 44% of the candidates were able to secure placement on merit. This leads to dissatisfaction among a large section of general students, as they are being deprived of marks in any examination despite scoring more than the under-quota candidates.

According to the information published in Prothom Alo, the number of registered freedom fighters is 200–250 thousands, that is, the number of freedom fighters is 1.2–1.5 per 1,000 people, which accounts 0.12–0.15% of the entire population. That means, for 0.12% freedom fighters, the quota amount is 30%, converting to thousands, it can be seen that the quota amount is 300 for 1% to 1.5% (one and a half) freedom fighters among 1,000 people.

== Movement of 2013 ==
The 2013 quota reform movement was a movement against Awami League government policies regarding jobs in the government sector in the country. The movement began in the same location that saw the 2013 Shahbag protests in Dhaka, Bangladesh. Although initially confined to the locality of Shahbag and Dhaka University campus, it eventually spread to other parts of Bangladesh. It attained popularity as students of different universities in various parts of the country brought out processions of their own while demonstrating in solidarity with the main protest movement and pressing forward with similar demands.

== Movement of 2018 ==
The 2018 quota reform movement was a student's movement demanding reforms in policies regarding recruitment in the Bangladesh government services. The movement was initiated by Bangladesh Chhatra Odhikar Parishad which began in Shahbag and on University of Dhaka campus on 17 February 2018, and eventually spread country-wide by 8 April 2018. The movement rapidly attained popularity among students of different universities and colleges forcing the government to announce changes.

== Movement of 2024 ==
The 2024 quota reform movement was a series of anti-government and pro-democracy protests in Bangladesh, spearheaded primarily by university students. Initially focused on restructuring quota-based systems for government job recruitment, the movement expanded against what many perceived as an authoritarian government when government-associated groups carried out the July massacre of protesters and civilians, most of whom were students. While it started as a student movement, the movement later escalated into a fully-fledged mass uprising known as the July Uprising.

The protest began in June 2024, in response to the Supreme Court of Bangladesh reinstating a 30% quota for descendants of freedom fighters, reversing the government decision made in response to the 2018 Bangladesh quota reform movement. Students began to feel like merit-based opportunities in public sector jobs would diminish. The protest quickly spread throughout the entire country because of the government's violent response, as well as growing public dissatisfaction against an oppressive government. The situation was further complicated by many other ongoing issues, like the government's inability to manage a prolonged economic downturn, reports of rampant corruption and human rights violations, and the absence of democratic channels for initiating changes.

== Outcome ==
In the wake of the 2018 protests, the cabinet of the government of Bangladesh on 3 October 2018, issued a circular dismissing the quota system for recruitment in the ninth to thirteenth grades (formerly known as first and second class jobs). On 30 July 2019, the government said, there is no quota in recruitment in 1st and 2nd class post (9th to 13th grade) at present, the quota for the post of 3rd and 4th class (14th to 20th grade) is still in force, but if no candidate of the relevant quota is found, it has to be filled from the merit list of the general candidate. In addition to clarifying the previous circular on quotas issued on 20 January 2020, the cabinet also approved a proposal provided by the Ministry of Public Administration to cancel quotas on direct appointments to eighth or higher grade posts in government jobs.

On 21 July 2024, the Appellate Division of the Supreme Court ordered an overhaul to the quota reservation system. It increased merit appointments in the civil service to 93% and reduced slots allotted for descendants of veterans of the 1971 Bangladesh Liberation War to 5%, with the remainder going to ethnic minorities, the disabled and third gender people.

On 23 July 2024, the Ministry of Public Administration published a gazette notification in line with the Supreme Court verdict on the quota system in government jobs. Law minister Anisul Huq said the new quota system will be followed while recruiting employees directly in all government, semi-government, autonomous and semi-autonomous institutions, statutory bodies and different corporations.
