= Chief Election Commissioner and Other Election Commissioners Appointment Act, 2022 =

Law of Bangladesh

Jatiya Sangsad
- Citation: Act No. 01 of 2022
- Territorial extent: Bangladesh
- Passed by: Jatiya Sangsad
- Passed: 27 January 2022
- Assented to: 29 January 2022
- Signed by: Mohammad Abdul Hamid (President)
- Signed: 29 January 2022
- Effective: 29 January 2022

Legislative history
- Introduced by: Anisul Huq (Minister for Law, Justice and Parliamentary Affairs)
- First reading: 23 January 2022
- Second reading: 27 January 2022
- Status: In force

The Chief Election Commissioner and Other Election Commissioners Appointment Act, 2022, is an act in Bangladesh passed in the Jatiya Sangsad on 26 January 2022. Provisions have been made in this act for the appointment of the Chief Election Commissioner and other Election Commissioners, as described in Article 118(1) of the Constitution of Bangladesh. This is the first such law since the independence of Bangladesh. At the same time, it is the first law passed by the Jatiya Sangsad in 2022. The Bangladesh Nationalist Party, the main opposition party, compared it to BaKSAL.

== Background ==
In 2012, President Zillur Rahman established a mediation forum known as the Search Committee to facilitate the formation of a new Election Commission, a method later followed by President Abdul Hamid in 2017 when he appointed a five-member commission led by KM Nurul Huda. The tenure of this commission concluded on 14 February 2022. In preparation for its reconstitution, President Hamid organized dialogues with political parties from 20 December 2021 to 17 January 2022, inviting 32 out of 39 registered parties to participate. The discussions began with the Jatiya Party and concluded with the Awami League, though seven parties, including the Bangladesh Nationalist Party (BNP) and Islami Andolan Bangladesh, boycotted the process. Most participating parties advocated for the enactment of a law to regulate the formation of the Election Commission, a requirement outlined in Article 118(1) of the Constitution of Bangladesh, adopted in 1972, but unfulfilled for fifty years. On 17 January 2022, the Cabinet approved a draft bill proposing the establishment of a Search Committee tasked with recommending candidates for the positions of Chief Election Commissioner and Election Commissioners.

== Reaction ==
During the passage of the final bill in parliament, members of the Jatiya Party and the Bangladesh Nationalist Party (BNP) criticized the process, alleging that the draft law was rushed. Legal expert Shahdeen Malik remarked that the legislation could result in the formation of an Election Commission aligned with the ruling government's preferences. Former Election Commissioner M Sakhawat Hussain expressed concern that the law leaves no room for the involvement of opposition parties or other political stakeholders. Badiul Alam Majumdar, Secretary of Shushashoner Jonno Nagorik, argued that the law may favor individuals loyal to the government. GM Quader noted a lack of transparency in the operations of the Search Committee. BNP Secretary General Mirza Fakhrul Islam Alamgir compared the law to the structure of the one-party system of BaKSAL. Syed Faizul Karim of Islami Andolan Bangladesh warned that the strategic design of the Election Commission law might ultimately backfire on the current administration.
