= Bangladesh Public Service Commission =

Government agency in Bangladesh

- Government Seal of Bangladesh
- Abbreviation: BPSC
- Founded: 1972
- Type: Governmental
- Legal status: Constitutional body
- Headquarters: Dhaka, Bangladesh
- Coordinates: 23.7801°N 90.3754°E
- Region served: Bangladesh
- Official language: Bengali
- Chairman: Mohammad Nazmuzzaman Bhuian
- Secretary: Md.Fazlur Rahman
- Website: www.bpsc.gov.bd

Bangladesh Public Service Commission (Bengali: বাংলাদেশ সরকারী কর্ম কমিশন) is a quasi-judicial constitutional body established in 1972. The commission is responsible for the recruitment of civil servants in the Bangladesh government. It was formed under Section 137 of Part IX, Chapter II of the Constitution of Bangladesh.

== History ==
The Public Service Commission was set up for the first time under British colonial rule in 1926. After independence, the commission was established in Pakistan in 1947 under the provision of Government of Pakistan Act. It was later known as the East Pakistan Public Service Commission. After the Independence of Bangladesh it was established as the Bangladesh Public Service Commission in 1972. For a while it used the Chummery House as its headquarters. It is responsible for holding Bangladesh Civil Service (BCS) Examinations and publishing their results.

=== Chairpersons ===
List of chairpersons:

No.	Name	Image	Took office	Left office	Tenure	Ref.
1	A. Q. M. Bazlul Karim		15 May 1972	15 December 1977	5 years, 214 days	
2	Mohiuddin Ahmed		25 May 1972	14 December 1977	5 years, 203 days	
3	M. Moydul Islam		22 December 1977	21 December 1982	4 years, 364 days	
4	Faiz Uddin Ahmed		22 December 1982	31 May 1986	3 years, 160 days	
5	S. M. Al-Husainy		1 June 1986	1 May 1991	4 years, 334 days	
6	Iajuddin Ahmed		14 September 1991	31 January 1993	1 year, 139 days	
7	S. M. A. Foyaz		1 March 1993	5 March 1998	5 years, 4 days	
8	Md. Mustafa Chowdhury		25 March 1998	23 January 2002	3 years, 304 days	
9	Z. N. Tahomida Begum		9 May 2002	7 May 2007	4 years, 363 days	
10	Saadat Husain		9 May 2007	23 November 2011	4 years, 198 days	
11	A. T. Ahmedul Huq Chowdhury		27 November 2011	20 December 2013	2 years, 23 days	
12	Ikram Ahmed		24 December 2013	13 April 2016	2 years, 111 days	
13	Muhammed Sadique		2 May 2016	18 September 2020	4 years, 139 days	
14	Mohammed Sohrab Hossain		21 September 2020	8 October 2024	4 years, 17 days	
15	Mobasser Monem		15 October 2024	18 August 2026	1 year, 307 days	
16	Mohammad Nazmuzzaman Bhuian		6 September 2026	Present	49 days	

== Current sommission ==
Current sommission
Name	Service	Designation	Term started
		Chairman	
	BCS Admin	Member	
	BCS Foreign	Member	
