= 2018 Bangladesh quota reform movement =

Students' movement demanding reforms in Bangladesh government services

- Part of Bangladesh quota reform movement
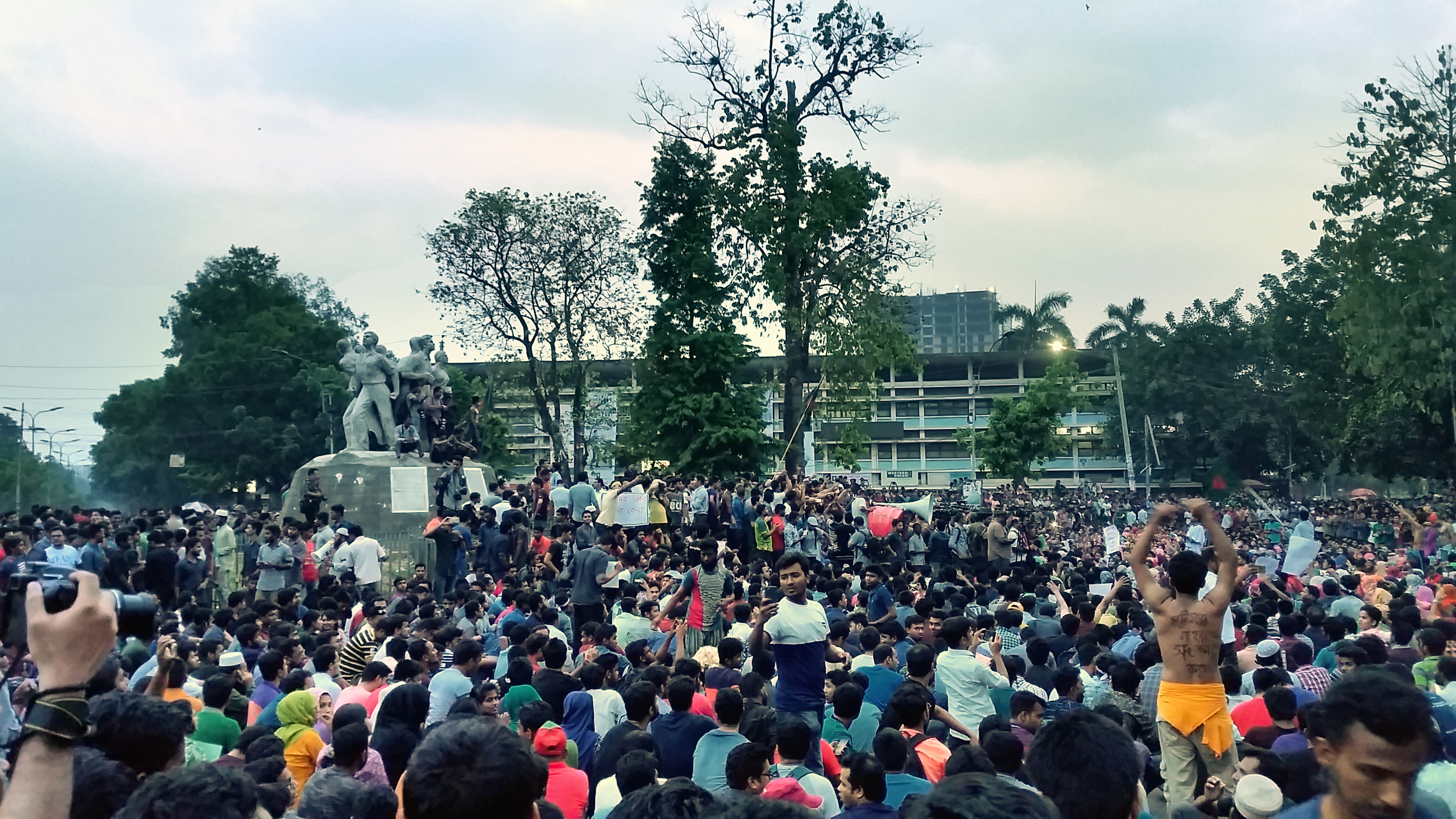
- Quota reform protesters at University of Dhaka.
- Date: 17 February 2018 - 18 July 2018
- Location: Bangladesh
- Goals: Decrease amount of quotas in government jobs in Bangladesh
- Methods: Processions, Road Blockade
- Result: The Government issued a circular reducing reserved quotas for government jobs from 56% to 35% and eliminating the freedom fighters' quota. § Outcome

Parties
Students of different universities of Bangladesh led by Bangladesh Chhatra Odhikar Parishad	Bangladesh Police	Bangladesh Chhatra League

Number
Millions		

Casualties and losses
Approx 262 injuries and 44 arrested		

The 2018 Bangladesh quota reform movement was a student's movement demanding reforms in policies regarding recruitment in the Bangladesh government services. The movement was initiated by Bangladesh Chhatra Odhikar Parishad which began in Shahbag and on University of Dhaka campus on 17 February 2018, and eventually spread country-wide by 8 April 2018. The movement rapidly attained popularity among students of different universities and colleges forcing the government to announce changes.

== Causes and demands ==
Under the existing Bangladesh government recruitment system, 56 percent of government job entry positions are reserved for specific "entitled" classes: 30 per cent for children/grandchildren of 1971 "freedom fighters," 10 per cent for women, 10 per cent is for districts based on population, 5 per cent for ethnic minorities, and 1 per cent for people with disabilities. Previous protests on the same issue were made in 2013 and 2008 but failed to bring change in government quota policy.

In July 2018, protests and counter-violence erupted at various Bangladeshi universities, particularly the University of Rajshahi (RU), over the ‘quota reform movement,’ which sought to change the quota system. RU's vice-chancellor, Professor M. Abdus Sobhan, dismissed the quota-reform movement as an "anti-government movement with a motive to carry out sabotage."

== Five point demands ==
1. The quota must be reduced from 56 per cent to 10 per cent
2. The vacant positions must be filled from the merit list if eligible candidate is not found from the quota
3. No special examination for quotas
4. The age-limit must be the same for every candidate
5. No candidate can use quota privilege for more than once

== Timeline ==
=== March ===
==== 21 March ====
On 21 March 2018, Prime Minister Sheikh Hasina announced the quota system in government jobs for freedom fighters, their children and grandchildren will continue when a section of students and job-seekers were agitating seeking quota reform in government jobs.

=== April ===
==== 8 April ====
On 8 April 2018, hundreds of students began protests in Shahbag after 2 pm. The protesters under the name Council to Protect Students' Rights demanded the quota system reforms by bringing down quotas altogether to 10 percent and filling up vacant quota posts by candidates from the merit list. At 7.30 pm, police started lobbing teargas shells, charged baton and used water cannons on the crowd. At 8.30 pm, protesters were attacked by a group of Bangladesh Chhatra League activists led by DU unit General Secretary Motahar Hossain Prince. More than 160 protestors were injured in the clashes that took place at Dhaka University campus.

==== 9 April ====
University students from all over Bangladesh boycotted classes, took out processions and blocked highways since morning to express solidarity with the demonstrators of the central program. Thousands of students of BUET, University of Rajshahi, Jahangirnagar University, University of Chittagong, Khulna University, KUET, SUST, Islamic University, Bangladesh, National Institute of Textile Engineering and Research, University of Barisal, etc. participated in the demonstrations in respective cities. A delegation of protesters met Minister Obaidul Quader at the Secretariat in the afternoon. Mr. Quader asked to postpone protests for one month so that the government may examine the quota system. But protesters refused to pause their programmes until there was specific announcements from the prime minister. Minister of Agriculture and presidium member of the ruling Awami League Matia Chowdhury made a controversial remark in Parliament by calling the quota reform protestors 'children of razakars'.

==== 10 April ====
Students of Stamford University Bangladesh, University of Asia Pacific, International University of Business Agriculture and Technology, East West University, North South University, Daffodil International University, Eastern University (Bangladesh), Independent University, United International University, American International University of Bangladesh and University of Information Technology and Sciences took to different streets in Dhaka and blocked a number of key thoroughfares for several hours. Leaders of Bangladesh Chhatra Odhikar Parishad called for a nationwide road blockade and strike at universities and colleges from 11 April 2018.

==== 11 April ====
After midnight, Iffat Jahan Esha, the president of Sufia Kamal hall unit of BCL tortured and wounded a female student named Morsheda in Sufia Kamal Hall of University of Dhaka for participating in quota reform protests. Photo and video of the incident quickly went viral on different social networking sites which drew attention to other general students. At 1 am, around 5,000 students of the university thronged in front of the Kabi Sufia Kamal Hall and took position in front of the gate in protest of the incident. Members of Chhatra League tried to block the protesters from getting out of halls to demonstrate by locking gates and threatening them, but protesters eventually broken down the locked gate at Bijay Ekattor Hall and came out.

Resuming the ongoing agitation demanding quota reforms in government jobs, students made demonstrations in Dhaka, Chittagong, Rajshahi, Comilla and other places. Many roads including two major highways were blocked by students of University of Dhaka, Sher-e-Bangla Agricultural University, Jahangirnagar University, Islamic University, Bangladesh, and other institutions. Dhaka-Rajshahi highway remained blocked since morning by several hundred students of RUET. More than 6,000 protesters blocked the CDA Avenue in Chittagong.

In a speech delivered in Parliament, the Prime Minister Sheikh Hasina criticised the protesters for creating public sufferings and angrily said,

"Alright then, there won't be any quotas. There is no need for quotas. They will take BCS exams and get jobs on their merit".

While many protesters rejoiced this statement as fulfillment of their demands, others remained skeptic about the commitment of the government and opted to wait until more specific declaration from the government regarding reformation of quota system is made.

==== 12 April ====
Bangladesh Chhatra Odhikar Parishad officially announced the end of quota movement and leader of this organization Nurul Haq Nur called Sheikh Hasina the Mother of Education. They demanded medical expenses for the injured students, release of the arrested students, and overall security for all of students.

Bangladesh Chhatra League has expelled 22 students from residential halls to participate in the quota reform movement at the Islamic University, Bangladesh, However, they are given the opportunity to return to the residential hall.

=== May–June ===
==== 2 May ====
Prime Minister Sheikh Hasina reaffirmed abolition of quota during a press conference at Ganabhaban, Dhaka on 2 May 2018.

==== 30 June ====
The students started second phase of protests saying there has been no sign of quota reform implementation after three months had been passed since Prime Minister Sheikh Hasina's announcement in Parliament. Protesting students came under several attacks by BCL in Dhaka University and Rajshahi University.

Members of quota reform movement scheduled a press briefing on 30 June 2018 at Dhaka University campus but could not hold it as they were attacked allegedly by the members of BCL.

=== July ===
==== 2 July ====
When students were staging a demonstration demanding quota system reform at Dhaka University campus, then at point Faruk Hasan (joint convener, Bangladesh Chhatra Odhikar Parishad) was snatched away allegedly by a group of BCL men. Moriom Mannan, a first year honours student of Political Science department at Tejgaon College, who joined the protests that day, came to rescue Faruk, but she herself experienced physical assault, verbal abuse and mental tortures allegedly inflicted by activists against quota reform movement and policemen.

Later that day Faruk Hasan went on traceless after being picked up by BCL men allegedly from central Shaheed Minar area.

==== 2 July Rajshahi University attack ====
On 2 July 2018, during their protest march near the main gate of RU, a master's student and joint convenor of the quota reform movement at the same university, Toriqul Islam, and 15 others, were attacked by some BCL men, including several local BCL officers, as nearby police stood still. Toriqul Islam was beaten with a hammer and sticks and other weapons, resulting in multiple leg fractures and severe head injury.

A video footage shot by reporter Arafat Rahaman, of The Daily star, covering the quota reform protests, during the attack allegedly showed the following attackers. Later the reporter Arafat Rahaman was recognised as the Best Photographer of the year-2018 for capturing the incident. :

- Abdullah Al Mamun, student of the sociology department of the university and assistant secretary of RU BCL, attacking with hammer
- Latiful Kabir alias Manik, a student of history department of the university an activist of Muktijoddha Santan Command, was seen with a machete
- Mehedi Hossan alias Mishu, a student of sociology department of the university and organising secretary of the RU BCL and, was seen with a large stick. Mehedi confessed his involvement in the attack.
- Ramijul Islam alias Rimu, 4th year student of History department of the university and vice president of RU BCL, was seen kicking Toriqul's head. Ramijul confessed his involvement in the attack.
- Hasan Labon, student of Law department of the university and organizing secretary of RU BCL
- Ahmed Sajib, student of Applied Mathematics of the university and vice president of RU BCL
- Shovon Kaiser, student of Economics of the university and vice president of RU BCL
- Mizanur Rahman, ex student of political science of the university and vice president of RU BCL
- Gufran Gazi, student of information and library management of the university and vice president of RU BCL
- John Smith, 4th year student of Urdu of the university and activist of RU BCL
- Soumitra Karmakar, student of fine arts of the university and assistant secretary of RU BCL

==== 3 July ====
Guardians and teachers of students, rights activists, and eminent citizens scheduled to hold a rally protest the continued attacks, torture and arrest of quota reform activists in front of the Jatiya Press Club at 4:00pm under the banner of "Udbigno Obhibhabok O Nagorik” (worried guardians and citizens). But Police barred demonstrators from holding the event claiming that they did not allow the programme as the demonstrators did not have the permission. When the demonstrators tried to assemble, Azimul Haque, additional deputy commissioner of police (Ramna Division), commanded his men to arrest whoever tries to take position there.

On the same day, Faruk Hassan was shown arrested in a police assault case of Shahbag police station.

==== 12 July ====
While addressing the parliament on 12 July 2018 Prime Minister Sheikh Hasina said that it is impossible to reform the freedom fighters' quota in public jobs because of a High Court verdict.

==== 17 July ====
While speaking at a function through video-conferencing from the Ganabhaban on 17 July 2018, Prime Minister Sheikh Hasina explained her earlier declaration (on 11 April 2018) of quota system removal was because there had been an anarchic situation created in the name of anti-quota movement.

==== 18 July ====
Under the banner of "All Combined Departments", around 500 students from different departments of Dhaka University formed a human chain on the Central Shaheed Minar premises in Dhaka, demanding exemplary punishment for those who attacked the quota reformists. Holding various placards protesting the recent attacks, they also demanded the release of quota reform leaders who were under arrest and a safe campus for all. Expressing solidarity with the students, assistant professor of DU's economics department Rushad Faridi attended the program. Besides, students of the university's history department formed a human chain at the Aparejeyo Bangla premises, protesting the recent attack on their fellow student Tanzir Hossain Sarker and demanded a safe campus for students. Associate professors Golam Saklayen Saki and MM Kawser were present at the human chain joined by around 200 students of the department. Later, the students brought out a silent procession from the spot. Boycotting regular classes and examinations, several hundred students of Jahangirnagar University also formed a human chain on the campus protesting the recent spate of attacks on some teachers and students and demanded reformation in the existing quota system.

== Concern over attack on quota reformists ==
The Embassy of Germany, USA, Norway, Switzerland and few other countries in Dhaka expressed their concern over the 'brutal attacks' on peaceful demonstration of the quota reform protesters.

== Against quota reform protest ==
Some politicians and university teachers have expressed their position against quota reform protest. Among them, Prof Md Akhtaruzzaman, Vice Chancellor of Dhaka University has compared the activities of quota reform protesters with that of Islamist militant outfits like the Taliban, Al-Shabaab and Boko Haram. He also compared the protests by female students at Dhaka University dormitory a characteristic of militant outfits pointing out that the militant outfits use women and children as their last resort. Vice Chancellor of RU, M Abdus Sobhan, also condemned the protest by saying that it is not a quota reform movement rather it is an anti-government movement. Dr. Muhammed Zafar Iqbal expressed that protesters were agitated at freedom fighters & thus disrespected freedom fighters' families.

== Arrests ==
According to Bangladesh police, more than 16 quota reform protesters including Muhammad Rashed Khan, Faruk Hossain, Tariqul Islam, Josim Uddin, Mashiur were arrested between April 2018 and July 2018.

== Outcome ==
In the wake of the movement, the Cabinet of the Government of Bangladesh on 3 October 2018, issued a circular dismissing the quota system for recruitment in the ninth to thirteenth grades (formerly known as first and second class jobs). On 30 July 2019, the government said, there is no quota in recruitment in 1st and 2nd class post (9th to 13th grade) at present, the quota for the post of 3rd and 4th class (14th to 20th grade) is still in force, but if no candidate of the relevant quota is found, it has to be filled from the merit list of the general candidate. In addition to clarifying the previous circular on quotas issued on 20 January 2020, the cabinet also approved a proposal provided by the Ministry of Public Administration to cancel quotas on direct appointments to eighth or higher grade posts in government jobs.

== Gallery ==
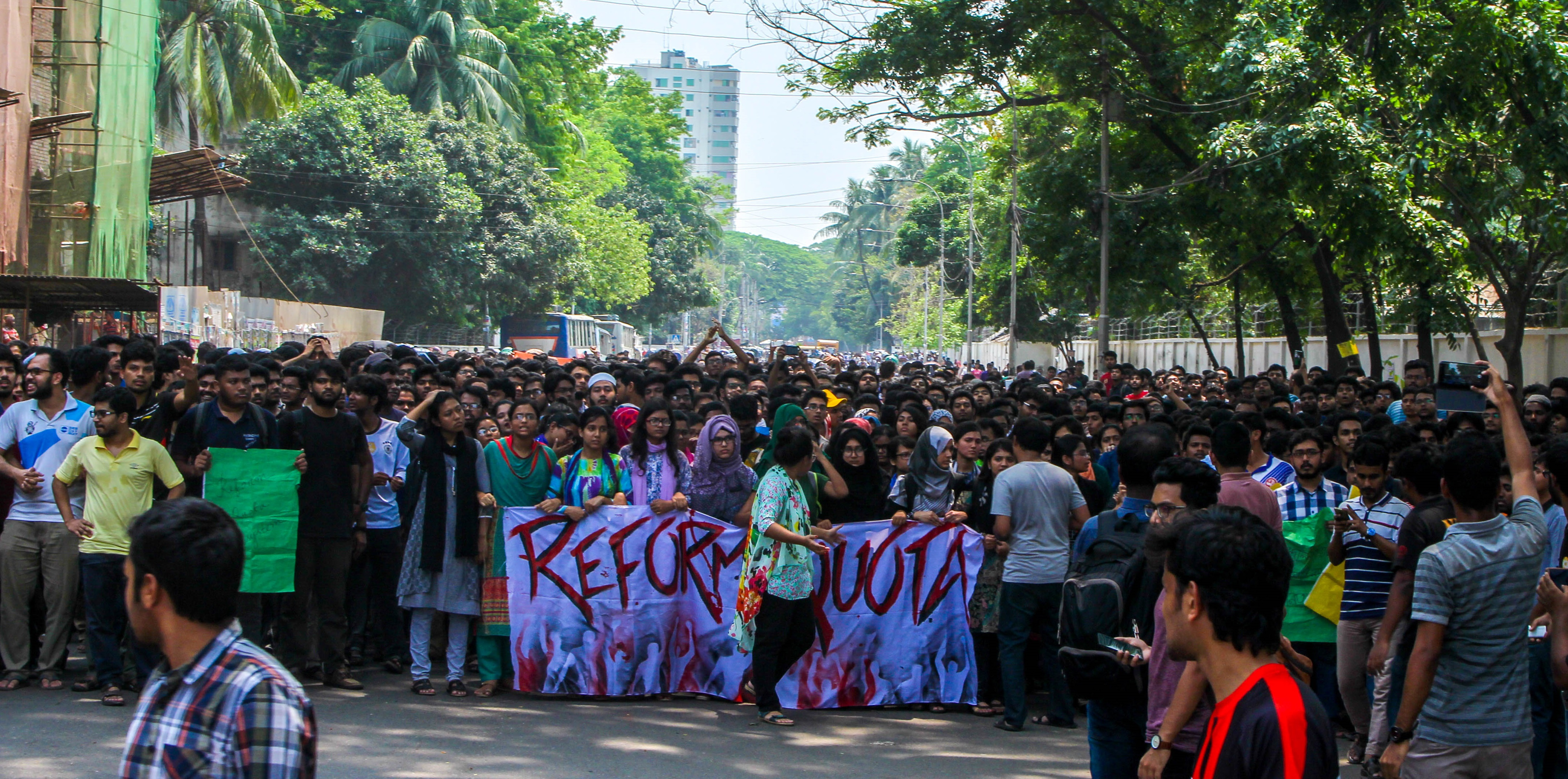

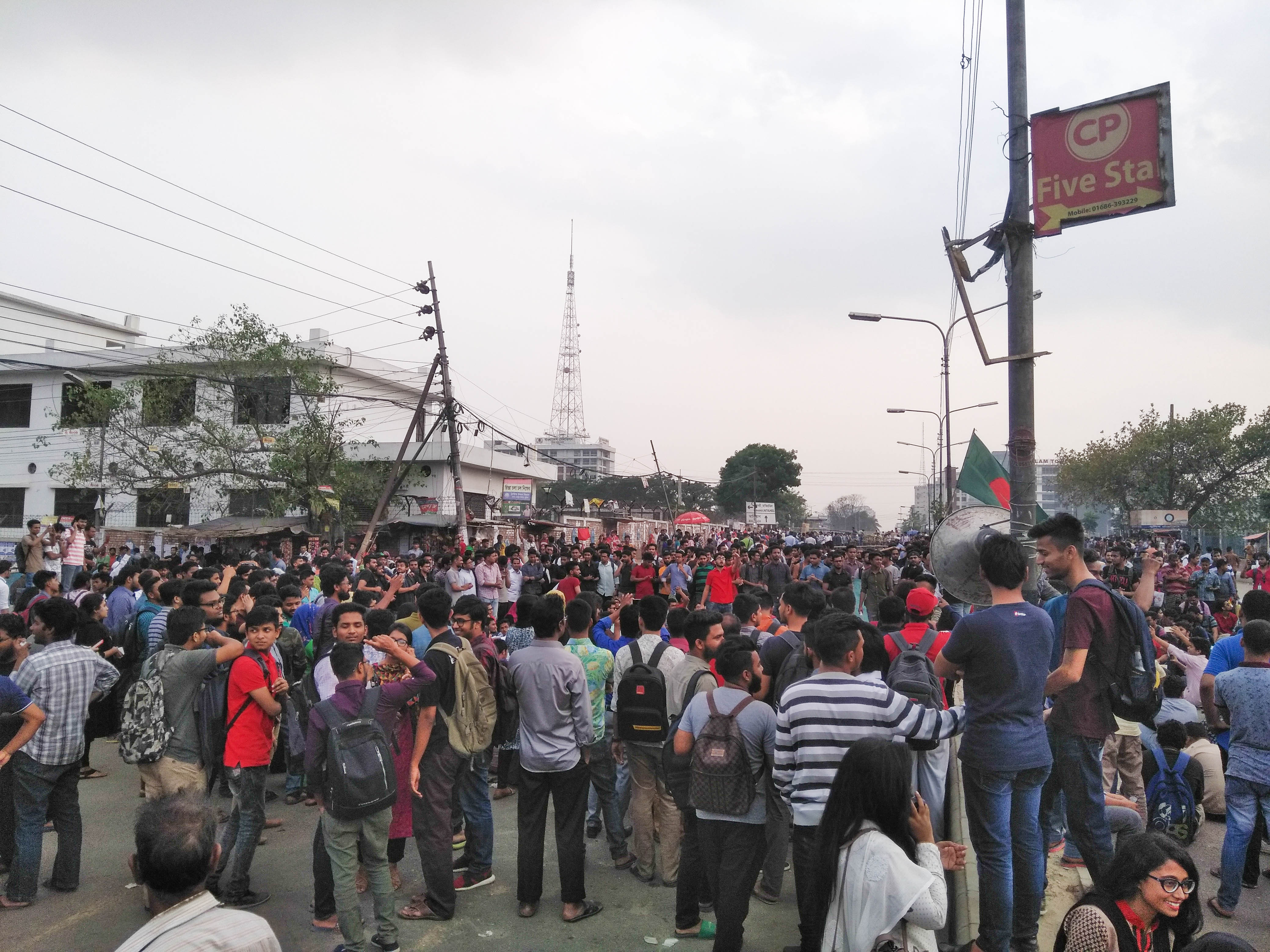

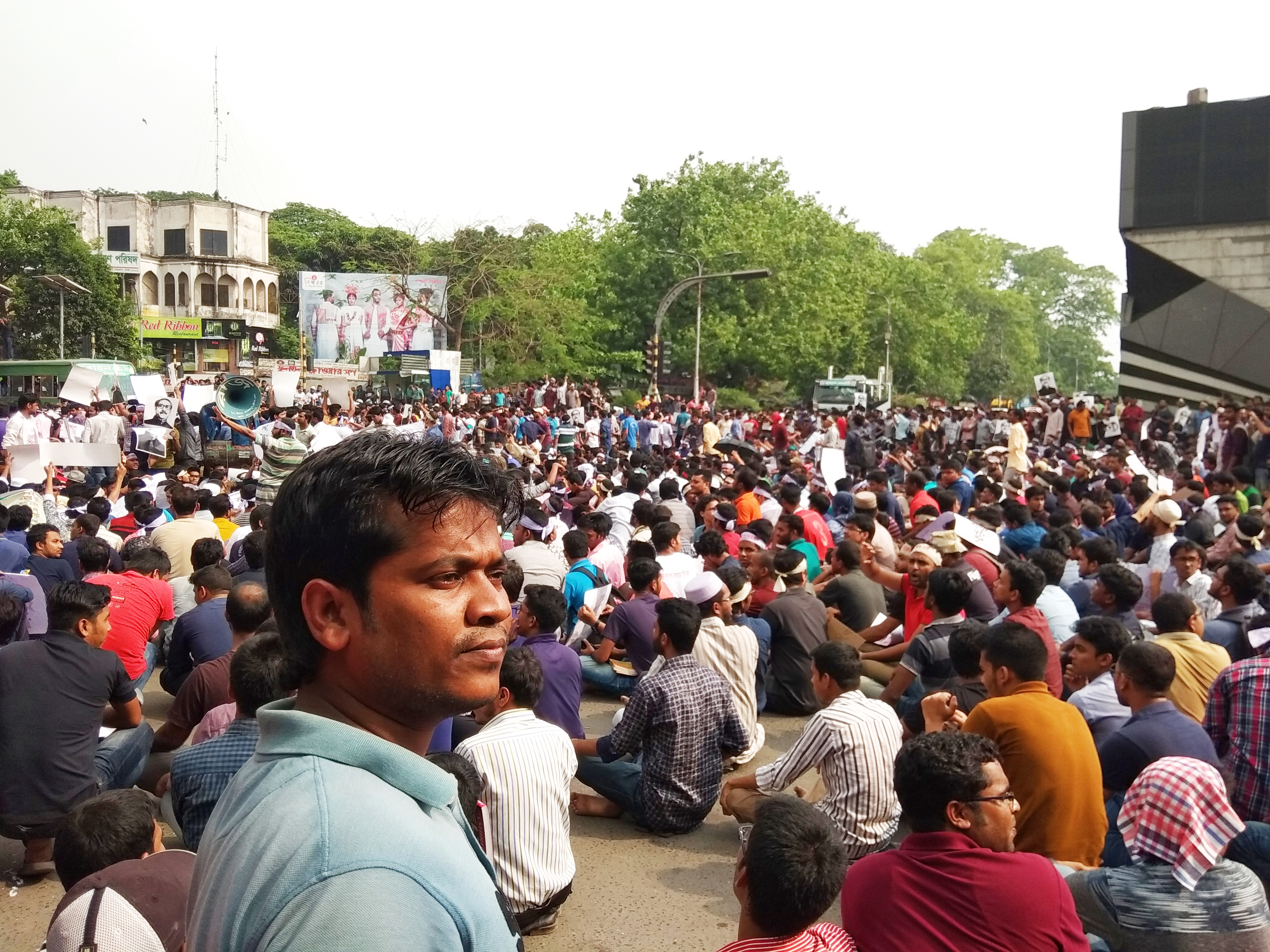

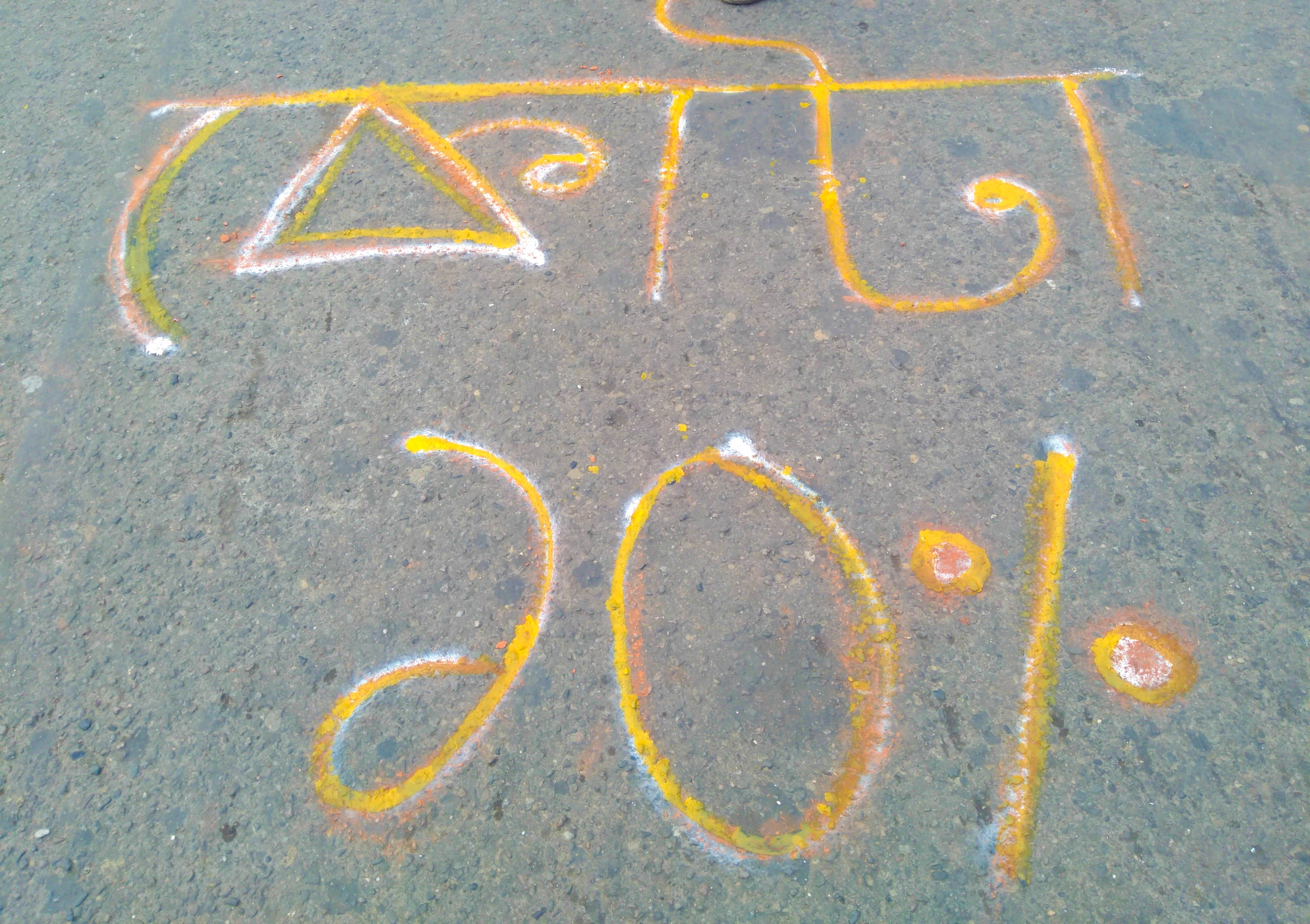

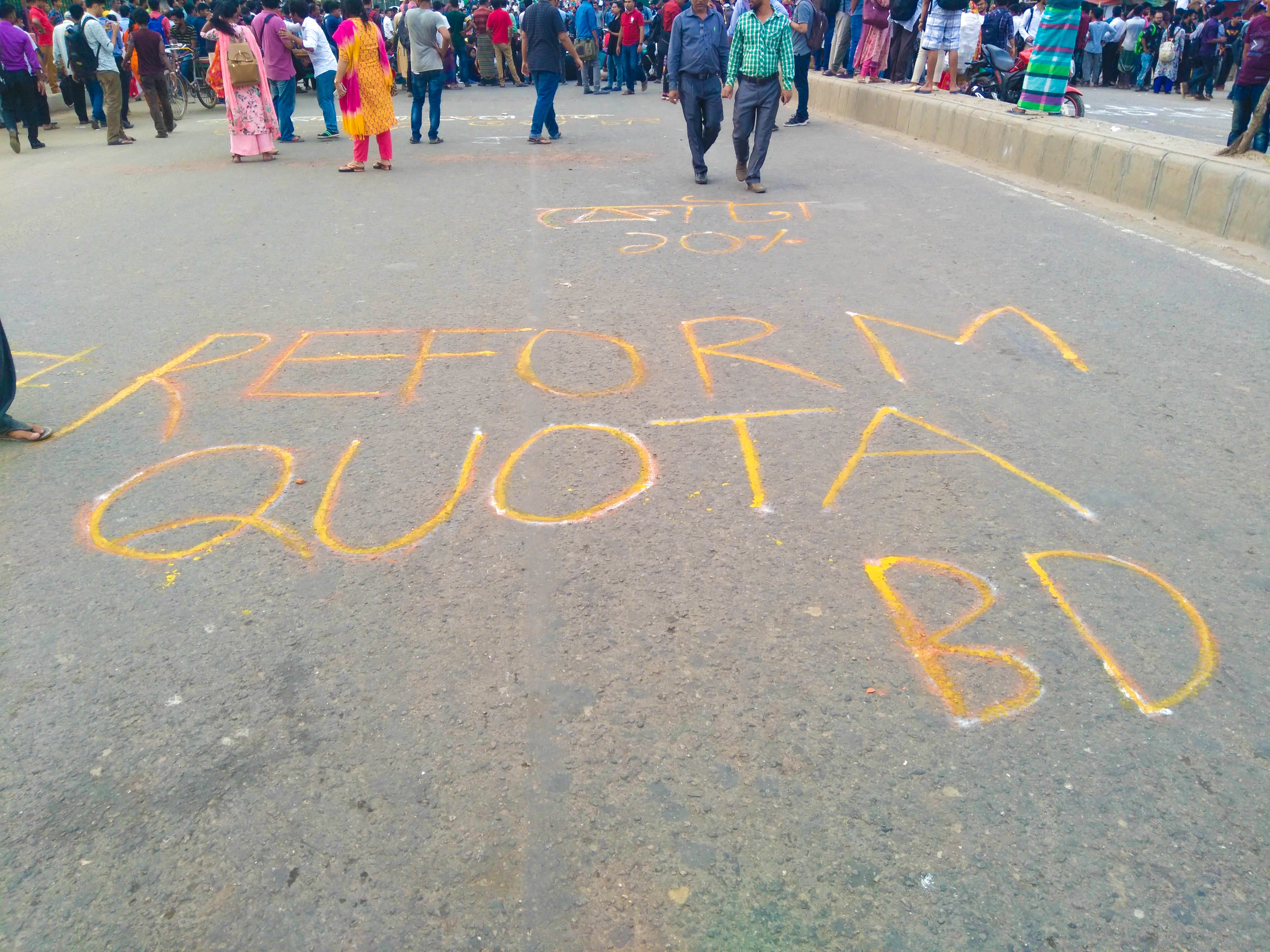

== See also ==
- 2018 Bangladesh road safety protests
- 2015 Bangladesh student protests
- 1952 Bengali language movement
- 2024 Bangladesh quota reform movement
