= 2013 Bangladesh quota reform movement =

- Part of Bangladesh quota reform movement
- Date: July 2013
- Location: Bangladesh
- Goals: Decrease amount of quotas in government jobs in Bangladesh
- Methods: Processions, Road Blockade
- Result: Movement unsuccessful: Government declaration to abolish quota system in government recruitment.

Parties
Students of different universities of Bangladesh led by Medhamullayon Mancha	Bangladesh Police; Bangladesh Chhatra League; Bangladesh Jubo League

Number
Several Thousands	

Casualties and losses
55+ injured and 50+ arrested.	

The 2013 Bangladesh quota reform movement was a movement against Awami League government policies regarding jobs in the government sector in the country. The movement began in the same location that saw the 2013 Shahbag protests in Dhaka, Bangladesh. Although initially confined to the locality of Shahbag and Dhaka University campus, it eventually spread to other parts of Bangladesh. It attained popularity as students of different universities in various parts of the country brought out processions of their own while demonstrating in solidarity with the main protest movement and pressing forward with similar demands.

== Causes and demands ==
Under the current BCS examinations system, 30 per cent of the seats are reserved for children of freedom fighters and 10 per cent for women. A further 10 per cent is reserved for districts, 5 per cent for national minorities and 1 per cent for people with disabilities. As a result, only 44 percent of the examinees are able to secure positions on the basis of merit, causing discontent among a large section of general students who say that they are deprived despite scoring higher than candidates who fall under any quota.

Protesters formed a 10-member committee known as ‘Medhamullayon Mancha’ and said Abdur Rahim, student of University of Dhaka would act as convener of the committee. They have called for the re-evaluation of results of the 34th BCS preliminary examination and the cancellation of quota system in all public examinations.

== Timeline of protests ==
=== 10 July ===
On Wednesday, 10 July 2013, hundreds of Bangladesh Civil Service examinees began protests demanding an immediate cancellation of all sorts of quota in public service recruitment. Several hundred job-seekers who did not pass the 34th BCS preliminary exam had gathered in the Shahbagh crossing, blocking the roads passing through, till 10:00 pm for more than 10 hours demanding the re-evaluation of answer scripts claiming that they had not been selected even after doing good in the exam and the cancellation of the quota system. The Bangladesh Public Service Commission later in the evening said that it would review the preliminary test results.

=== 11 July ===
On Thursday, 11 July 2013, the students, who gathered at Shahbagh intersection for the 2nd day demanding cancellation of the quota system in recruitment to government jobs, were forced to leave the place as police charged baton and lobbed teargas shells on them. In a short time, the clashes spread throughout the Dhaka University campus area. Protesters alleged that ruling party Chhatra League activists joined the police in attacking protesters on the Dhaka University campus and beat them up with lethal weapons, sticks and iron rods. The demonstrators vandalised several vehicles, including two cars of private TV channels, DU registrar building, proctor office and sociology department.

News reports gave information of about 15 persons arrested while more than 55 students were injured in the clashes.

=== 12 July ===
Police and activists of Bangladesh Chhatra League (BCL), foiled attempts by protesters to hold prescheduled processions by BCS job seekers on the campuses of Bangladesh University of Engineering and Technology (BUET), Dhaka Medical College Hospital and Dhaka University on Friday.

Two cases were filed against 1,700 unidentified government job seekers in connection with the violence on the 11th of July in the city's Shahbagh area. Officer-in-charge of Shahbagh Police Station Sirajul Islam said that police had filed both the cases — one against 500 people and another against 1,200 — under the Bangladesh Penal Code Act with the police station. Besides, security official of Dhaka University, SM Quamrul Ahsan, also filed a case at Shahbagh police station against 500 students accusing them of vandalism on the campus on Monday night, bringing the total number of accused to 2,200 job seekers.

Police detained 34 people in connection with the violence at Dhaka University on Friday.

=== 13 July ===
Resuming the ongoing agitation over job reservations, a group of students held a demonstration in front of Dhaka University Central Library, demanding revocation of the quota system. Witnesses said leaders of the DU chapter of the Chhatra League disbanded the protesters when they tried to stage a rally on the campus. Soon after the first group dispersed, another group took out a procession holding the banner "Amra Muktijoddhar Shontan". Meanwhile, over 1,000 students of Rajshahi University (RU) demonstrating against the quota provision in public service recruitment blocked the Dhaka-Rajshahi highway since Saturday morning. They started the protest in front of the university's main gate around 11:00am, halting traffic movement on the highway.

The protesters in a press release announced to observe strike in all educational institutions across the country on Sunday to press home their demands, including cancellation of quota system in all government jobs, withdrawal of lawsuits, unconditional release of detained and arrested persons and justice for the Chhatra League attack on peaceful protesters upon probe.

=== 14 July ===
Anti Quota protests continued at Dhaka University (DU), Chittagong University(CU), Shahjalal University of Science and Technology (SUST) and Rajshahi University(RU). Thousands of students participated in the demonstrations and classes and exams were reportedly suspended at CU and SUST.

== Spread of protests nationwide ==
From 11 June onwards, the protests spread to other parts of the country as students of Jahangirnagar University, Shahjalal University of Science & Technology at Sylhet, Bangladesh Agricultural University (BAU) (Mymensingh), Rajshahi University, Chittagong University, Islamic University, Kushtia decided to express solidarity with Dhaka University-based protesters. Students of public universities outside Dhaka took to the streets and formed human chains. They also chanted slogans, blocked highways and held placards and festoons to press home their demands.

== Reactions ==
=== 11 July ===
The protests have sparked a lot of debate on various social media platforms.

The prime minister's public administration adviser HT Imam, on speaking with the media said,‘The government has no plans to reform the existing quota system in the civil service exams.'

Dhaka University Proctor Amzad Ali flanked by ruling party Chhatra League men, said, “When they began demonstration yesterday (Wednesday), we were sympathetic to their demand, but today (Thursday) what they are doing indicates that some other forces, maybe from Jamaat-Shibir, have infiltrated them and doing the damage working from inside. These kind of activities are quite unacceptable.”

=== 12 July ===
Condemning the violence on general students and expressing support with the demands of the anti-quota demonstrators, opposition party BNP acting secretary general Mirza Fakhrul Islam Alamgir said in a statement.“The government has become so desperate that it does not hesitate to let loose police and Jubo League and Chhatra League cadres to attack students instead of taking their justified demand into consideration,”

An organization called 'Amra Muktijoddhar Sontan' on Friday took stance against the anti-quota protests when it claimed that the anti quota movement was being influenced by Jamaat-e-Islami and Islami Chatra Shibir. “We have taken to the streets to voice our demand for fulfilling quotas in all cadre posts of special BCS (Bangladesh Civil Service). We will not go back until our demands are satisfied,” added the organization's president Humayun Kabir.

=== 13 July ===
Acting Jamaat-e-Islami Secretary Rafiqul Islam Khan, while expressing support for the protests said, "The number of meritorious educated unemployed are rising in the country due to the quota system being effective and acute frustration is forming among the meritorious students and youths. Accepting the demand of the protesting students and youths, this problem should be solved swiftly. But attacking them by police and party cadres without considering their rational demands is very sad and painful. We think quota system needs to be annulled to create skilled and competent administrative leadership."

The Public Service Commission (PSC) on Saturday said the reviewed results of the 34th BCS preliminary test would be published on Sunday. The Commission decided to reverse the decision to apply the quota policy at the 34th BCS preliminary result. However, the quota would still be applied in the later stages.

=== 14 July ===
The Public Service Commission (PSC) on Sunday came up with a reviewed list of 46,250 successful candidates, the highest so far. “These 46,250 candidates include the 12,033 whom we announced as successful in our previous list (earlier published on Tuesday, 9th of July),” said PSC Exam Controller (cadre) AYM Nesar Uddin.

=== 18 July ===
Prime Minister Sheikh Hasina said that her government will make sure that those who were engaged in vandalism demanding cancellation of quota system in public service recruitment will not get any government jobs in future.

“We’ve the pictures, we’ll place them before the PSC before the viva-voce examinations so that these notorious elements can’t get government jobs,” she said in her introductory speech at the Awami League Central Working Committee (ALCWC) meeting at her official residence Ganobhaban.
