= 2024 Bangladesh quota reform movement =

Anti-government students' movement

- Part of Bangladesh quota reform movement and the July Uprising
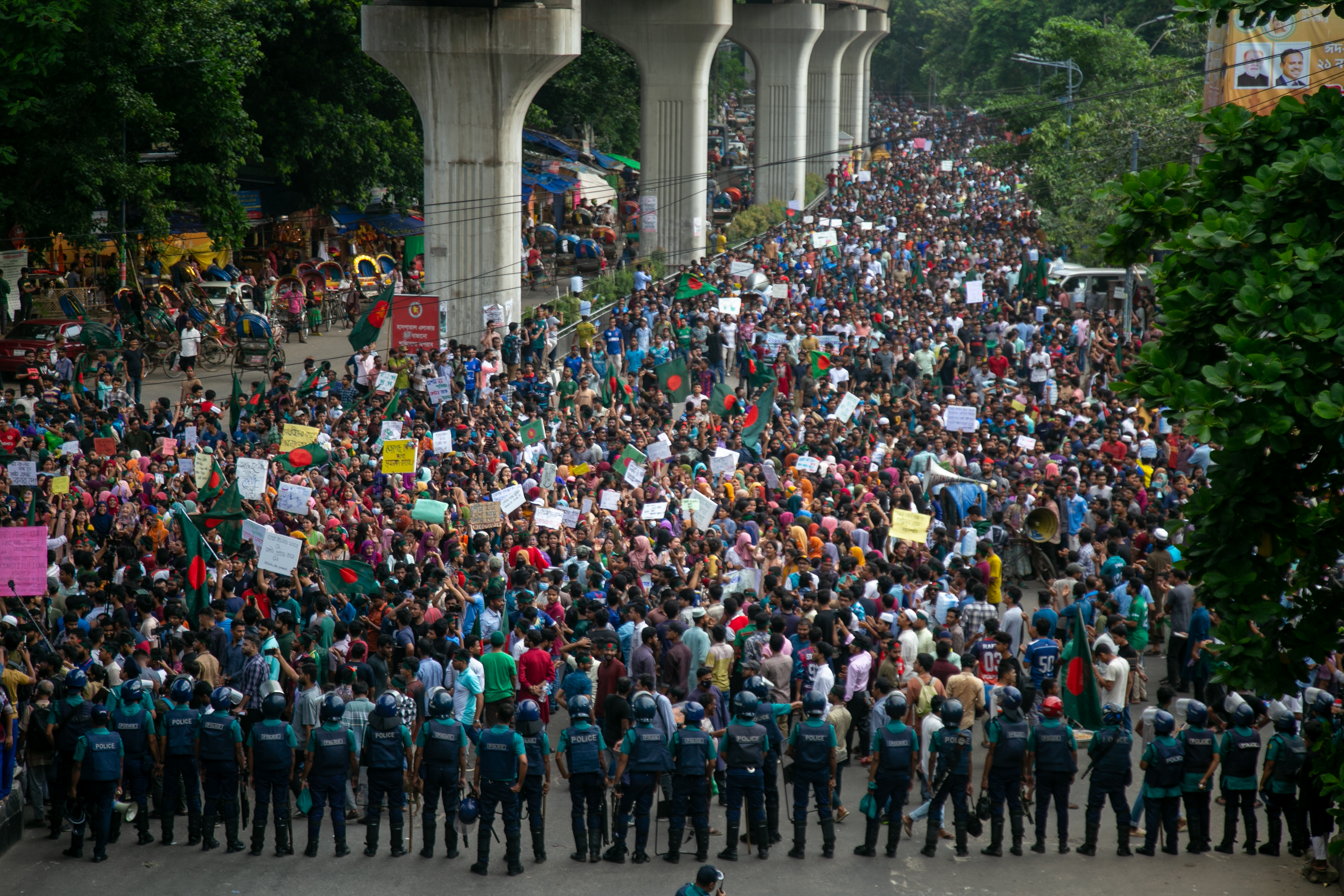
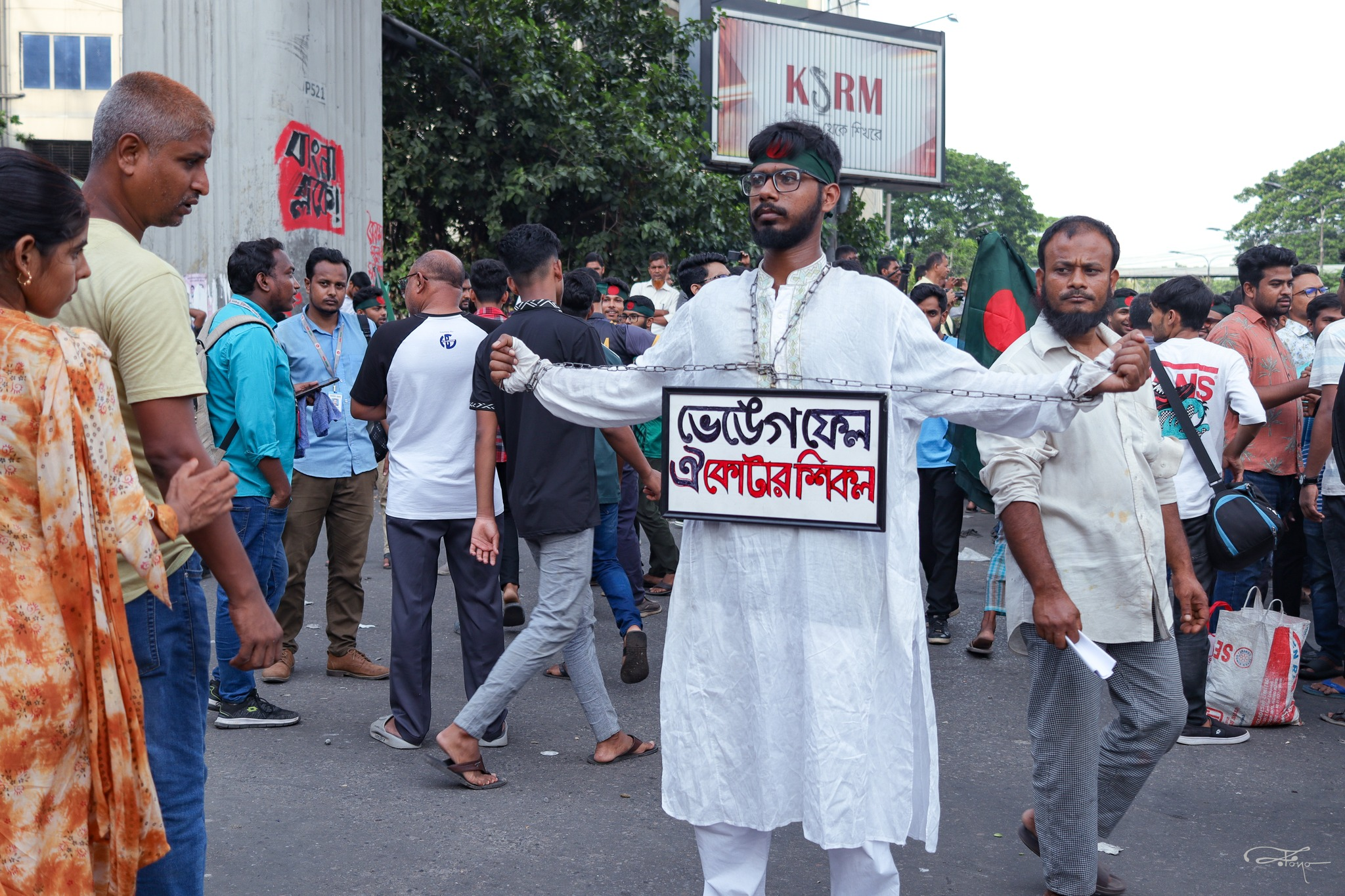
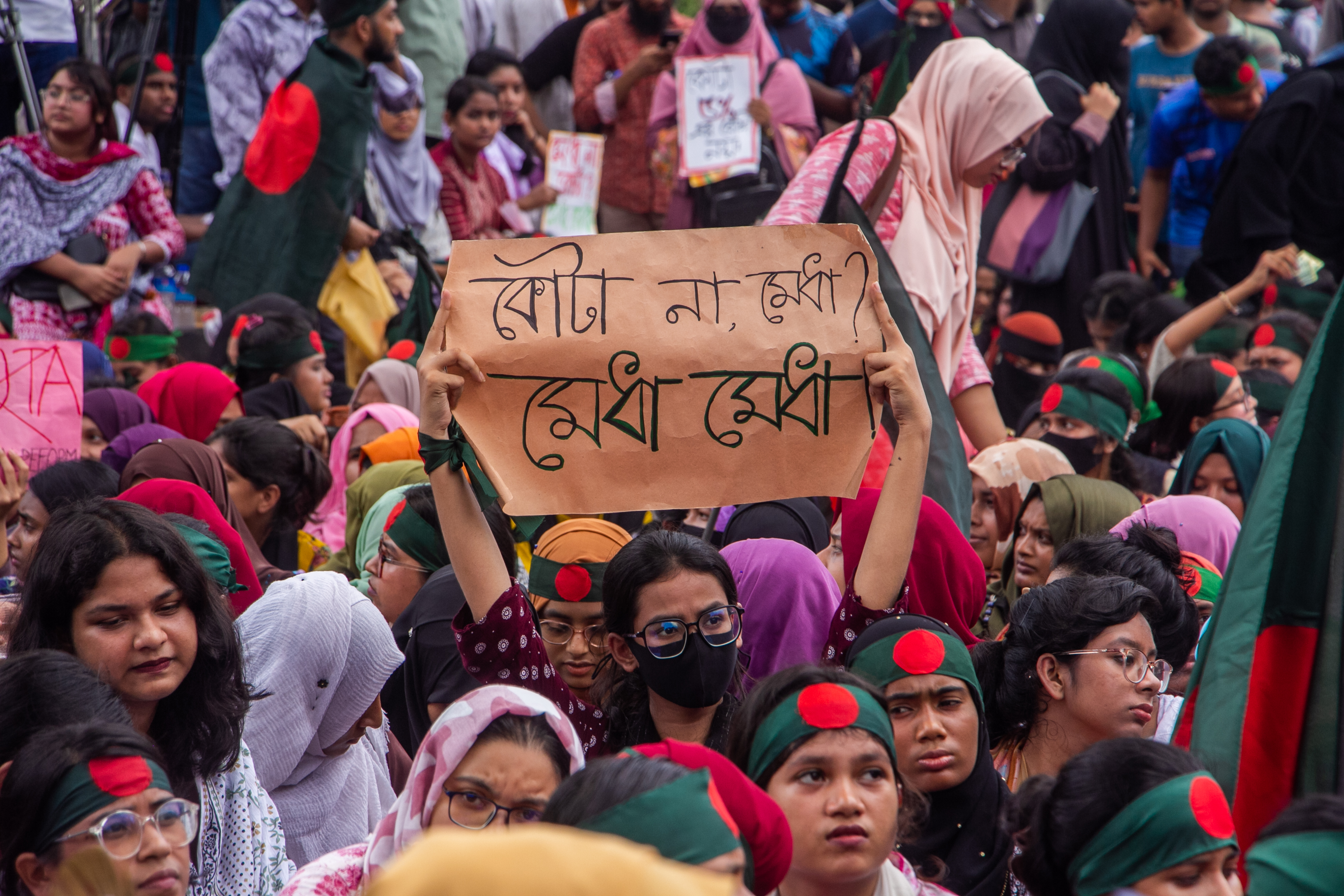
- Police blockade in a mass procession A male student wearing shackles carrying a sign saying "Break down the shackles of those quotas" (ভেঙ্গে ফেল ঐ কোটার শিকল) A female student carrying a sign reading "Quota or merit? Merit! Merit!" (কোটা না, মেধা? মেধা! মেধা!)
- Date: 6 June – 3 August 2024 (1 month and 4 weeks)
- Location: Bangladesh and abroad
- Caused by: Reinstatement of the pre-2018 quota system in government jobs following the Bangladesh High Court's declaration of the 2018 circular as illegal.
- Goals: Initially focused on quota reform.
- Methods: Protests; Public demonstrations; Traffic obstruction; Picketing; Sitdown strikes; Occupation; Rail obstruction; Internet activism; Lawsuits; Civil disorder; Riots; Arson; Vandalism; Assault; Looting; Remittance boycott
- Result: Successful: The Appellate Division, Supreme Court of Bangladesh orders 93% of recruitment in government jobs to be based on merit, with the public administration ministry publishing a gazette notification in line with the Supreme Court verdict.; Massacre of students and protesters; Nationwide shutdown of internet, social media and curfew issued; Arson and vandalization of many state properties and infrastructures, including the state-owned Bangladesh Television; Beginning of Non-cooperation Movement

Parties
Protesters: Students Against Discrimination; Students from various universities, colleges, schools and madrasas; University teachers; Media persons, singers, writers, poets, artists, social media influencers; Some lawyers and members of bar council; Bangladesh diaspora; Supported by: Bangladesh Nationalist Party; Bangladesh Jamaat-e-Islami; Islami Andolan Bangladesh; Gono Odhikar Parishad; Revolutionary Workers Party of Bangladesh; Proletarian Party of East Bengal; Ganosanhati Andolan; Left Democratic Alliance; Communist Party of Bangladesh; Socialist Party of Bangladesh	Government of Bangladesh; Bangladesh Police; Rapid Action Battalion; Detective Branch; Armed Police Battalion; Border Guard Bangladesh; Bangladesh Ansar; Bangladesh Armed Forces; Bangladesh Army; Pro-quota protesters: Grand Alliance; Awami League; Bangladesh Chhatra League; Bangladesh Awami Jubo League; Bangladesh Awami Swechasebak League; Jatiya Samajtantrik Dal; Bangladesh Tarikat Federation; Bangladesh Muktijuddha Mancha; Muktijoddha Sangsad Santan Command

Lead figures
Collective leadership: Nahid Islam; Asif Mahmud; Mahfuj Alam; Sarjis Alam; Hasnat Abdullah; Nusrat Tabassum; Shadik Kayem; Abu Sayed †; And others...	Sheikh Hasina; Asaduzzaman Khan; Anisul Huq; Mohammad A. Arafat; Farhad Hossain; Zunaid Ahmed Palak; Obaidul Quader; Saddam Hussain; Sheikh Enan; Md Mainul Hossain Khan Nikhil

Casualties and losses
Deaths: 1,650 anti-quota protesters (MoHFW estimates) and 2 JCD activists; Injuries: 22,000 people (including anti-quota protesters, children and non-protester civilians); Arrests: 12,000+	Deaths: 9 pro-quota activists (including 2 Awami League, 1 Chhatra League, 2 Jubo League, 2 Swechhasebak League, 1 Sramik League and 1 Matsyajibi League), 44 Policemen and 1 Ansar paramilitary soldier; Injuries: 536 pro-quota activists (includes 33 Awami League, more than 200 Chhatra League, 1 Jubo League and 302 Swechhasebak League) and 1,117+ Policemen
- Deaths: At least 45 non-protester civilians (including 32 children) and 4 journalists; Total: At least 1,500+ deaths; Injuries: 225+ journalists

The 2024 Bangladesh quota reform movement was a series of anti-government and pro-democracy protests in Bangladesh, spearheaded primarily by university students. Initially focused on restructuring quota-based systems for government job recruitment, the movement expanded against what many perceived as an authoritarian government when government-associated groups carried out the July massacre of protesters and civilians, most of whom were students. While it started as a student movement, the movement later escalated into a fully-fledged mass uprising known as the July Uprising.

The protest began in June 2024, in response to the Supreme Court of Bangladesh reinstating a 30% quota for descendants of freedom fighters, reversing the government decision made in response to the 2018 Bangladesh quota reform movement. Students began to feel like merit-based opportunities in public sector jobs would diminish. The protest quickly spread throughout the entire country because of the government's violent response, as well as growing public dissatisfaction against an oppressive government. The situation was further complicated by many other ongoing issues, like the government's inability to manage a prolonged economic downturn, reports of rampant corruption and human rights violations, and the absence of democratic channels for initiating changes.

The government sought to suppress the protests by shutting down all educational institutions. They deployed their student wing, the Chhatra League, along with other factions of the Awami League party. These groups resorted to using firearms and sharp weapons against the demonstrators. The government then deployed Police, RAB, BGB and other armed forces, declaring a nationwide shoot-at-sight curfew amid an unprecedented government-ordered nationwide internet and mobile connectivity blackout that effectively isolated Bangladesh from the rest of the world. Later, the government also blocked social media in Bangladesh. Government forces cordoned off parts of the capital city of Dhaka and conducted Block Raids, randomly picking up anyone they suspected having links to the protest, causing fear among the city residents. As of August 2, there were 215 confirmed deaths, more than 20,000 injuries, and more than 11,000 arrests. The unofficial death toll was between 300 and 500. UNICEF reported that at least 32 children were killed during July's protests, with many more injured and detained. Determining the exact number of deaths has been difficult because the government reportedly restricted hospitals from sharing information with the media without police permission, hospital CCTV footage was confiscated, and numerous individuals with gunshot wounds were buried without identification.

The Awami League government, led by Prime Minister Sheikh Hasina have suggested that political opponents have co-opted the protest. Despite the curfew restrictions the movement remained ongoing as it expanded its demands to include accountability for violence, a ban on the student wing of the government Chhatra League, and resignation of certain government officials, including the resignation of Sheikh Hasina. The government's use of widespread violence against the general public turned the student protests into a people's uprising known as the Non-Cooperation Movement.

== Background ==
After the High Court ruled in favour of quotas on 5 June 2024, the students of various universities in Dhaka united to demand quota reform. After the movement was initially started, it was postponed due to Eid al-Adha and the summer holidays. After the holidays, the agitation started again peacefully but gradually became widespread. Initially, the students and teachers of many public universities and other educational institutions joined the movement. Later, the students of private universities also followed suit by joining the public demonstration. Under the banner of Students Against Discrimination (Bengali: বৈষম্যবিরোধী ছাত্র আন্দোলন), students started the Bangla Blockade. During the movement, the Appellate Division issued a status quo for four weeks on 10 July, canceling the freedom fighters' quota. Reacting to the court verdict, the students said they are seeking a final solution to the quota issue from the government, claiming the movement has nothing to do with the court. The protest also affected the domestic train and road transportation networks across Bangladesh.

Peaceful demonstrations by the students restarted on 1 July, while public university teachers declared a strike protesting the new Universal Pension Scheme, causing universities to close. Demonstrations spread nationwide as the movement became headed by a newly formed Students Against Discrimination, an umbrella organisation for the student protesters. On July 7, protestors launched the nationwide Bangla Blockade, obstructing traffic and rail in major cities and metropolises including Dhaka, Chittagong, Comilla, Jessore, Rangpur, Rajshahi, and Bogra. While the Appellate Division ordered a four-week status quo regarding the quota on 10 July, protesters continued to demand a solution from the government. Protests turned violent for the first time the next day as the police clashed with the students. On 14 July, Prime Minister Sheikh Hasina made controversial remarks about the anti-quota protests, escalating the situation and raising the public's anger. On 15 July, the ruling Awami League solidified its stance against the demonstrations, and the protestors met first violent suppression from the Chhatra League leaving several hundred injured. In response to the Chhatra League attacks, student protesters at Rajshahi University vandalized halls, targeting the room of the President of RU Chhatra League and other members associated with the group. The protesters in the University of Dhaka removed Chhatra League members from 11 different halls and declared a ban on the pro-quota student organization. At other universities across the country, students expelled Chhatra League members from their campuses, with some members in Chittagong even being thrown from high rooftops by angry protesters during clashes. These actions led to many campuses independently declaring themselves "Chhatra League Free".

== Demands ==
=== Initial demands ===
The Students Against Discrimination put forward the following demands to the government:

- Cancellation of the existing quota system for government jobs.
- Provision of the quota at fair rates to minority groups and disabled people.
- Passing a new law in the parliament which establishes a new quota system for a maximum of 5% of total jobs.

=== After nationwide violence ===
In response to the violent protests involving members of the Bangladesh Chhatra League and Bangladesh Police, the Students Against Discrimination issued a revised nine-point demand. The demands include:

1. Prime Minister Sheikh Hasina should publicly apologize, and take responsibility for the deaths of students during the protests.
2. Home Minister Asaduzzaman Khan and Road Transport and Bridges Minister Obaidul Quader should resign from their cabinet positions and party roles for their alleged roles in using law enforcement and Chhatra League to carry out violence against the protesters.
3. Deputy inspectors general of police, police commissioners, and superintendents of police in the areas where student casualties occurred must be dismissed from their posts.
4. The vice-chancellors and proctors of Dhaka University, Jahangirnagar University, and Rajshahi University must resign due to their inadequate response to the violence against students.
5. There should be a nationwide ban on the Awami League's student wing Bangladesh Chhatra League in all educational institutions in Bangladesh.
6. Policemen, law enforcement officers, army/military officials and any individuals involved in the attacks should be arrested and held accountable according to the laws.
7. Financial compensation should be provided to the families of students who were killed or injured during the protests.
8. All educational institutions and student residential halls should be reopened immediately.
9. Law enforcement officers, including armed forces and other security personnel, should be withdrawn from all educational institutions to ensure a peaceful environment.

== Timeline ==
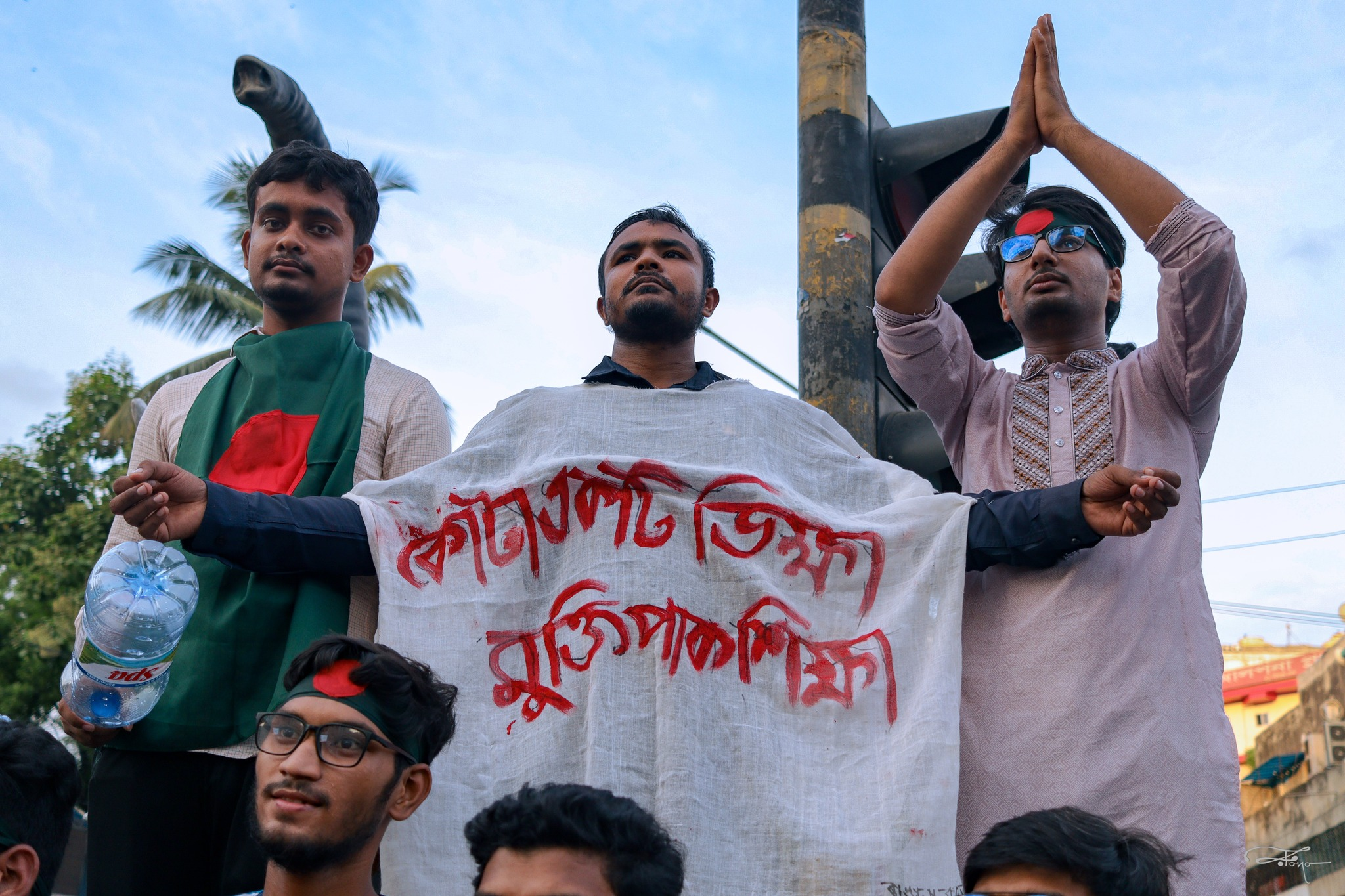
Student carrying a protest sign written "কোটা একটি ভিক্ষা; মুক্তি পাক শিক্ষা" (lit. 'Quota is an alm; education be freed').

RAB Bell 407 helicopter shooting at protesters during the protest.

Quota Reform Protest in Muradpur, Chittagong

=== Early phase (5 June – 9 July) ===
On 5 June, the High Court re-established the job quota that reserves 30% of the civil service posts for the children and grandchildren of freedom fighters in the Bangladesh Liberation War.

Six universities performed peaceful protests against the quota ruling.

The protests calmed down because of the Eid-ul Adha celebrations, but they soon restarted after the break.

On 7 July, students staged a blockade and demanded the rescinding of the quota.

=== Bangla Blockade and Chhatra League attacks (10–17 July) ===
==== 10 July ====
At approximately 11:00 a.m. in the University of Dhaka, a protest march commenced in front of the library, passed by the Anti Terrorism Raju Memorial Sculpture, and culminated in the blockage of the Shahbag intersection. Members of the law and order forces positioned barricades in front of the students. In the afternoon, it is known that the status quo has been given for four weeks in the ruling given by the High Court cancelling the quota system. The Chief Justice asked the students to go back. Dhaka's transport system came to a standstill due to the blockade in various parts of Dhaka. Long-distance buses and trains were stopped due to the agitation.

Police attacked protesting students of Cumilla University.

==== 11 July ====
The blockade in Shahbag was supposed to start at 3:00 p.m. but due to rain, the students crossed the police barricade on their way to Shahbag and started later at 4:30 p.m. Dhaka College students retreated due to police barricades and Dhaka University students joined the students of Jagannath University at Shahbag. Apart from Shahbag, other places in Dhaka were unaffected by the movement. At 9:00 p.m., the students ended their agitation and announced a protest march and rally on 12 July to protest the violent police attack on them.

==== 12 July ====
At 5:00 p.m., students gathered at Shahbag and staged a blockade in the area.

While students were protesting at Comilla Victoria College, a group of Chhatra League members launched an attack on the protesters. During the situation, a student who was recording a video was taken to a hall and beaten by the Chhatra League members.

==== 13 July ====
Students protested by blocking the railway tracks in Rajshahi. In Dhaka, DU students held a press conference in the evening, where they complained that attempts were being made to block the students' movement with lawsuits.

==== 14 July ====
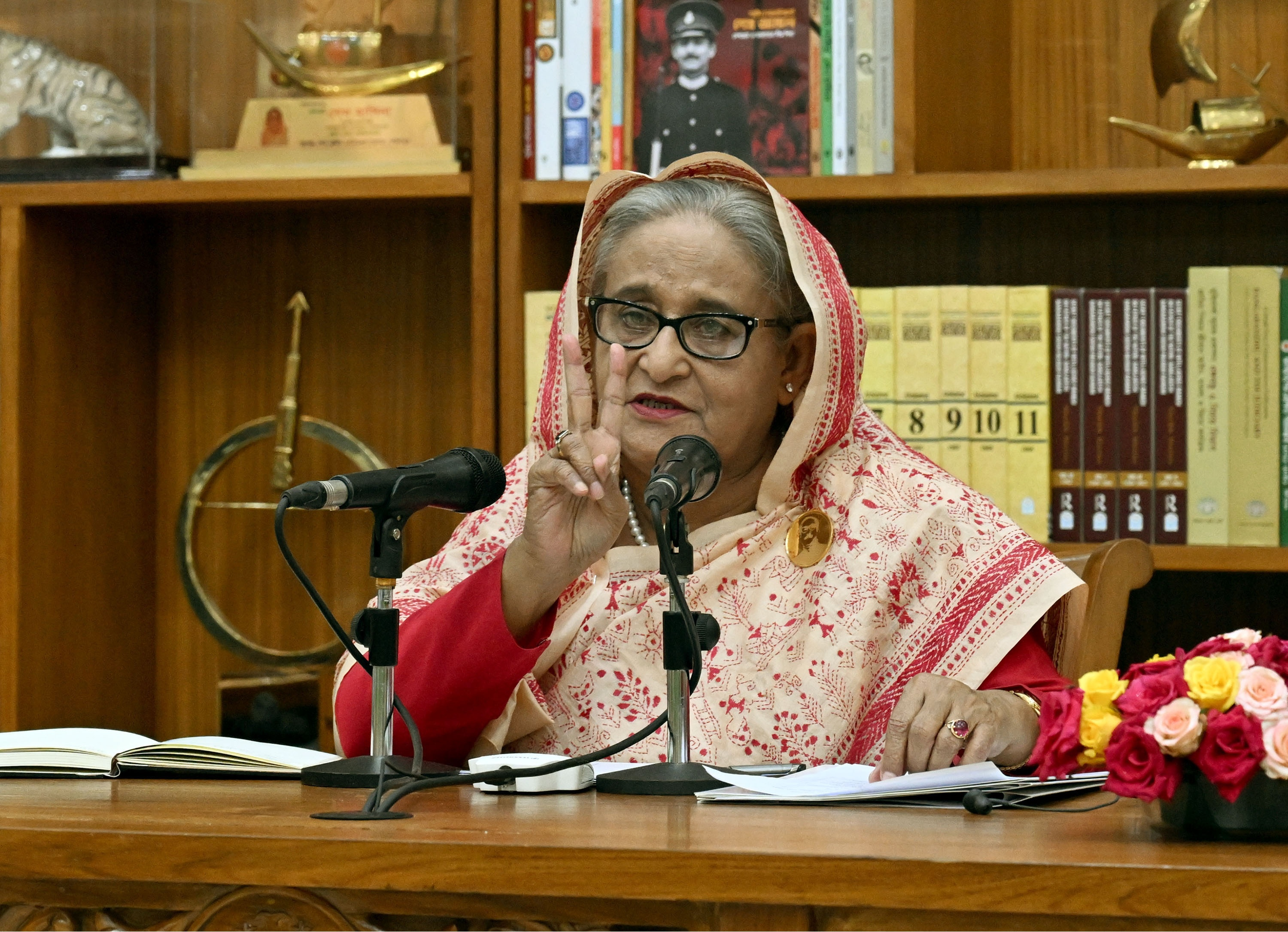
At this press conference on 14 July 2024, Sheikh Hasina linked the quota reform protesters to Razakars, drawing sharp criticism and further escalating the unrest that ultimately culminated in her resignation.

Students marched in Dhaka and held a sit-in protest and blockade, later submitting a memorandum to President Mohammed Shahabuddin.

In response to the controversial statement made by the Prime Minister of Bangladesh during a press conference, where she reportedly referred to students protesting the quota reform movement as the children of Razakars (traitors in the Bangladesh Liberation War), students organized a midnight demonstration at the Dhaka University campus area (See the § Razakar remarks section). Female students from Rokeya Hall joined the protest by breaking the lock put up by the authorities at the dorm gate.

The government instructed operators to shut down the 4G network in the University of Dhaka area. At around 11:30 p.m., leaders and members of the Chhatra League attacked protesters at the University of Chittagong injuring 13 protesters.

==== 15 July ====
The attacks against the protesters began soon after the ruling Awami League general secretary said on Monday that the Chhatra League, the student wing of the ruling party, was ready to give a fitting reply to quota protesters for their 'arrogant behaviour.'

In Jessore at around 12:00 p.m., students from Jessore University of Science and Technology and Michael Madhusudan College staged a protest, where a member of the Chhatra League attacked and injured a protester.

In Dhaka, Members of the Chhatra League started their procession to Shahbag from Segunbagicha near Department of Fisheries at around 3:45 p.m.

Later in the evening, Chhatra League members attacked students inside Bijoy Ekattor Hall of Dhaka University, where some of the attackers were seen shooting with pistols and carrying sticks. In response, the protesters also threw brickbats from the inside of the hall to retaliate. While covering the protest in the University of Dhaka, two journalists from The Daily Star and Prothom Alo were assaulted and injured in the attack carried out by the Chhatra League.

At 5:30 p.m., members of the Chhatra League attempted to attack the emergency department of Dhaka Medical College Hospital, where over 200 students injured in the clashes were seeking treatment. After several attempts throughout the afternoon, Chhatra League members, some wearing helmets, forcibly entered DMCH around 7:30 p.m. and initiated an attack. Many were observed carrying rods. They targeted students already injured in the quota reform movement and vandalized several ambulances parked at DMCH.

Later the same evening, an attack carried out by the Chhatra League Rajshahi branch at Rajshahi University left six students injured, including the joint convenor of the Bangladesh Students Union at RU.

In Comilla, The Comilla University coordinator of the Students Against Discrimination was assaulted at around 8:00 p.m. when eight Chhatra League members called him to check his phone and beat him.

The protesters called for nationwide demonstrations and rallies in all educational institutions of the country at 3:00 p.m. on 16 July.

==== 16 July ====
At around 12:15 a.m., members of the Chhatra League attacked Jahangirnagar University students using firearms. The students took shelter at the vice-chancellor's residence after breaking its lock. Around 300 Chhatra League members, armed with galvanized pipes and sticks, threw bricks and glass bottles at the students. Shots were reportedly fired, injuring two journalists, including one from Dhaka Tribune and over 50 student protesters.

Police arrived to control the situation, while both groups positioned themselves outside the vice-chancellor's residence. Students claimed the attackers included outsiders, some in their forties. Later on, the sub-inspector of the Ashulia Police Department instead decided to blame the students by stating that the protesters are to blame for causing "this mayhem".

A violent incident involving police and students demanding quota reforms took place in front of Begum Rokeya University, Rangpur between 2:30 p.m. and 3:00 p.m. Police resorted to lathi charges and firing during the incident. Abu Sayed, a Begum Rokeya University student and quota reform activist, was shot four times by a police officer. He was taken to Rangpur Medical College where the doctors pronounced him dead on arrival.

At around 3:30 p.m., it was reported that in the Farmgate–Khamarbari area, Chhatra League assailants attacked protestors with sticks while students from Government Science College, Dhaka were protesting against the attack of Chatra League in University of Dhaka. When the protestors took shelter in the Farmgate metro station, the assailants entered and started to beat the students, which was witnessed by the passengers. Police were allegedly deployed to control the situation. However, DMTCL, the authority responsible for the operation for the Dhaka Metro Rail, denied these claims and stated that guards of the station drove the "miscreants" away as they entered with bamboo sticks. They also stated that there was no damage to the station. However, they announced plans to close some of the gates of the station complex for some time to prevent the recurrence of such incidents.

As students at public universities were forcefully vacated, students from various schools, colleges, and private universities joined the cause. They protested and blocked roads against the violence of the Chhatra League in the quota reform movement. (Note: Notre Dame College, Dhaka Residential Model College, RAJUK Uttara Model College, Adamjee Cantonment College, Viqarunnisa Noon School and College, Government Science College, Ideal School and College, Ideal College, Dhaka City College, BAF Shaheen College Dhaka, BAF Shaheen College Kurmitola, Birshrestha Noor Mohammad Public College, Birshreshtha Munshi Abdur Rauf Public College, Primeasia University, United International University, BRAC University, University of Liberal Arts Bangladesh, Ahsanullah University of Science and Technology, Dania College, Dr. Mahbubur Rahman Mollah College, State University of Bangladesh, Enam Medical College and Hospital, Bangladesh University of Business and Technology, Daffodil International University, North South University, American International University Bangladesh, Independent University, Bangladesh, Eastern University, City University, East West University, Southeast University, International University of Business Agriculture and Technology, BGMEA University of Fashion & Technology, Manarat International University, Dhaka International University)

Students of North South University, Independent University Bangladesh, American International University - Bangladesh, United International University, Dhaka International University and BRAC University protested at and around their respective premises areas at Bashundhara Residential Area and Merul Badda with the blockade set up by the students extending up to Baridhara, the Pragati Sarani streets in front of the Jamuna Future Park mall, the largest mall in the country, Notun Bazar, Badda, and Kuril, causing gridlock to its neighboring areas as well, including Rampura, Banasree, Badda Link Road and Abul Hotel area in Malibagh. During this time, Asif Mahtab Utsha, former lecturer of Brac University, notable for the textbook tearing controversy, joined with his students in front of Jamuna Future Park, being the first teacher in Bangladesh to do so. He gave a speech in the open and in front of national media where he rebuked his colleagues for not joining the students and being their shield, while also challenging the Chaatra League criminals who attacked Dhaka University students to come to Bashundhara Gate. In his speech he attempted to boost morale of the students by saying, "I did not teach my students to fall back. No retreat, only forward".

Students of The International University of Scholars, Primeasia University and Fareast International University blocked the Banani area and New Airport road. Students of Notre Dame College protested in the country's main financial hub and the largest central business district of Motijheel at Shapla Square. Students of Daffodil International University also attempted to start a demonstration on the road but instead protested on campus. Students of other universities and colleges also joined the protests. Protests also took place in Dhanmondi, specifically in front of the Science Laboratory area and in Uttara. Gridlocks were also experienced at places like Mohammadpur, Dhanmondi, Mirpur Road, and Gabtoli.

Students blocked railway lines in Chittagong and Mohakhali. The Dhaka–Chittagong, Dhaka–Barisal, Dhaka–Rajshahi and Dhaka–Tangail highways were also blocked.

In the evening, the Ministry of Education announced the indefinite closure of schools and colleges and the postponing of the HSC exam scheduled for 18 July.

The UGC declared that all public and private universities across the country will remain closed until further notice. At the same time, all affiliated medical, textile, engineering and other colleges will also remain closed. The commission also directed university authorities to vacate residential halls allegedly considering safety of the students.

In remembrance of the fallen, the movement announced a symbolic funeral prayer scheduled for July 17.

==== 17 July ====
Clashes erupted with police after the funeral prayer program organized by the student protesters, the Bangladesh Nationalist Party (BNP) and other parties to honor six individuals killed on 16 July for the quota reform movement.

The government ordered all students to vacate the residential halls. The protestors rejected the order, to which the authorities deployed police to evacuate the halls. Students who blocked the Dhaka-Barisal highway announced a total shutdown for 18 July, allowing only emergency services, to protest police violence, demand justice for the deceased, and call for a terror-free campus.

Sheikh Hasina addressed the nation at 7:30 p.m., where she announced a judicial probe into the deaths during the anti-quota protests and urged patience until the Supreme Court delivers its verdict, emphasizing justice for the students and condemning the violence.

Students at the university erected the Shaheed Smriti Stambha, a memorial pillar to honor the memory of the dead students.

=== Complete Shutdown (18–19 July) ===
==== 18 July ====
In the morning police clashed with BRAC University students on the streets of Badda. Police also charged batons and fired tear gas canisters at the students and poisonous tear gas shells at the BRACU campus. The Mirpur-10 station of the Dhaka Metro was closed for arson at a foot-overbridge beneath it. Reports indicated that approximately 30 students were killed by the Bangladesh police.

Minister of Law Anisul Haque urged the students to withdraw their movement. (Note: Subsequently, the protester students stormed the headquarters of the state-owned television network, Bangladesh Television, and committed an arson attack. The network halted its transmissions following the attack.)

The Bangladesh Police, RAB, Bangladesh Bank, Bangladesh Prime Minister's Office and Chhatra League's official website was hacked by a pro-protester group as a response to the violence and attacks carried out by the police and the Chhatra League.

Dhaka Metro Rail services in the capital were suspended, and at around 9 p.m., the government shut down internet access across the entire country.

A second-year student from the Department of Chemical Engineering and Polymer Science at Shahjalal University of Science and Technology drowned while attempting to cross a canal with friends. The incident occurred during a police chase amid clashes between students, police and Chhatra League members.

==== 19 July ====
The Dhaka Metropolitan Police, in an attempt to hinder the students' protests, announced the indefinite suspension of public gatherings and processions. The Bangladesh Railway authorities, on orders from higher-ups in the government, directed train services between Dhaka and the rest of the country to shut down to prevent quota reform protestors from using trains to travel or form gatherings, according to several unnamed railway supervisors speaking with Prothom Alo. The nationwide shutdown of Internet access begun on 18 July continued into 19 July.

Avatar of Cloudflare Radar

Cloudflare Radar
(@CloudflareRadar)
tweeted:

Bangladesh is experiencing a near complete #Internet outage after a government-ordered shutdown of mobile networks. Traffic and announced address space dropped to near-zero around 15:00 UTC (21:00 local).

19 July 2024

Throughout the country, calls for quota reform protests largely continued. Around 10:00 a.m., teachers at Rajshahi University of Engineering & Technology wore black face coverings in protest. At approximately 12:45 p.m., after protesters in Kishoreganj District's Bhairab Thana surrounded the police station, police fired into the crowd from within the station, injuring over a hundred students.

Some clashes with the police also took place elsewhere, including in Uttara, Mohammadpur, and Badda thanas of Dhaka. The Mirpur 10 and Kazipara metro stations were vandalised, causing extensive damages worth ৳500 crore (US$41 million).

In Narsingdi, a group of people stormed a prison and released hundreds of inmates before setting the facility on fire.

The government imposed a curfew at midnight and deployed troops nationwide.

=== Negotiations and Supreme Court verdict (19–22 July) ===
After the deadly Shutdown, the Students Against Discrimination and the government started negotiations on 19 July night. At midnight, a meeting took place between three government representatives and three representatives of the protesters: Sarjis Alam, Hasnat Abdullah, Sakib Ahmed Tuhin and Tanvir Ahmed. Notably, Sarjis Alam was a member of the Chhatra League and participated in the 2019 DUCSU election as a candidate from the Chhatra League.

During the negotiations, at midnight of 20 July, Nahid Islam, a quota reform movement coordinator, was allegedly taken from a friend's house in Nandipara, according to his father. After being released on 21 July, Nahid reported being blindfolded, handcuffed, and tortured before regaining consciousness in Purbachal.

On 21 July, the Appellate division of the Supreme Court finally reduced the percentage of quotas from 56% to 7%.

=== Suspensions (23–28 July) ===
Following the verdict on July 22, the Students Against Discrimination announced a two-day suspension of protests. They demanded that the government lift the curfew, restore internet access, and cease targeting student protesters. With the suspension of the protests by the Students Against Discrimination, no further violence was reported by this period. The agitators later further extended the suspension. But mass detentions were continued by the law enforcement agencies.

On 26 July, police detained three coordinators of the Students Against Discrimination from the hospital, namely Nahid Islam, Abu Bakar Mazumder and Asif Mahmud. The Home Minister claimed their detention was for their own security and investigation purposes. The later day, two more coordinators of the movement– Sarjis Alam and Hasnat Abdullah were detained. The Additional Deputy Commissioner of the Detective Branch Junaed Alam Sarker and stated that they were detained for interrogation about their alleged connection with the opposition Jamaat-e-Islami and Gono Odhikar Parishad Member-Secretary Nurul Haq Nur. In response, the movement threatened to resume their protests from 29 July if the three were not released, while also demanding action against ministers and police officers over the deaths of the protesters.

Meanwhile, the government gradually relaxed the curfew restrictions, allowing banks, factories and offices to reopen.

On 23 July, the ICT Minister announced that the government would restore broadband internet service partially to banks, business organizations, export sectors, and selected areas after a five-day disruption. Accordingly, on 24 July, broadband internet services were restored, and on 28 July, mobile internet was restored in Bangladesh, although social media websites like Facebook, Instagram and TikTok continued to be blocked.

On 28 July, six protest coordinators of the Students Against Discrimination, who had been taken into custody by the Detective Branch, issued a statement from the DB office announcing the withdrawal of the protests. However, other coordinators of the movement alleged that these individuals had been coerced by the DB into making the statement. The remaining coordinators vowed to continue their protest, with or without the support of the six individuals.

=== Resumption (29 July – 2 August) ===
Police arresting protestors from ECB Chattwar, Dhaka Cantonment

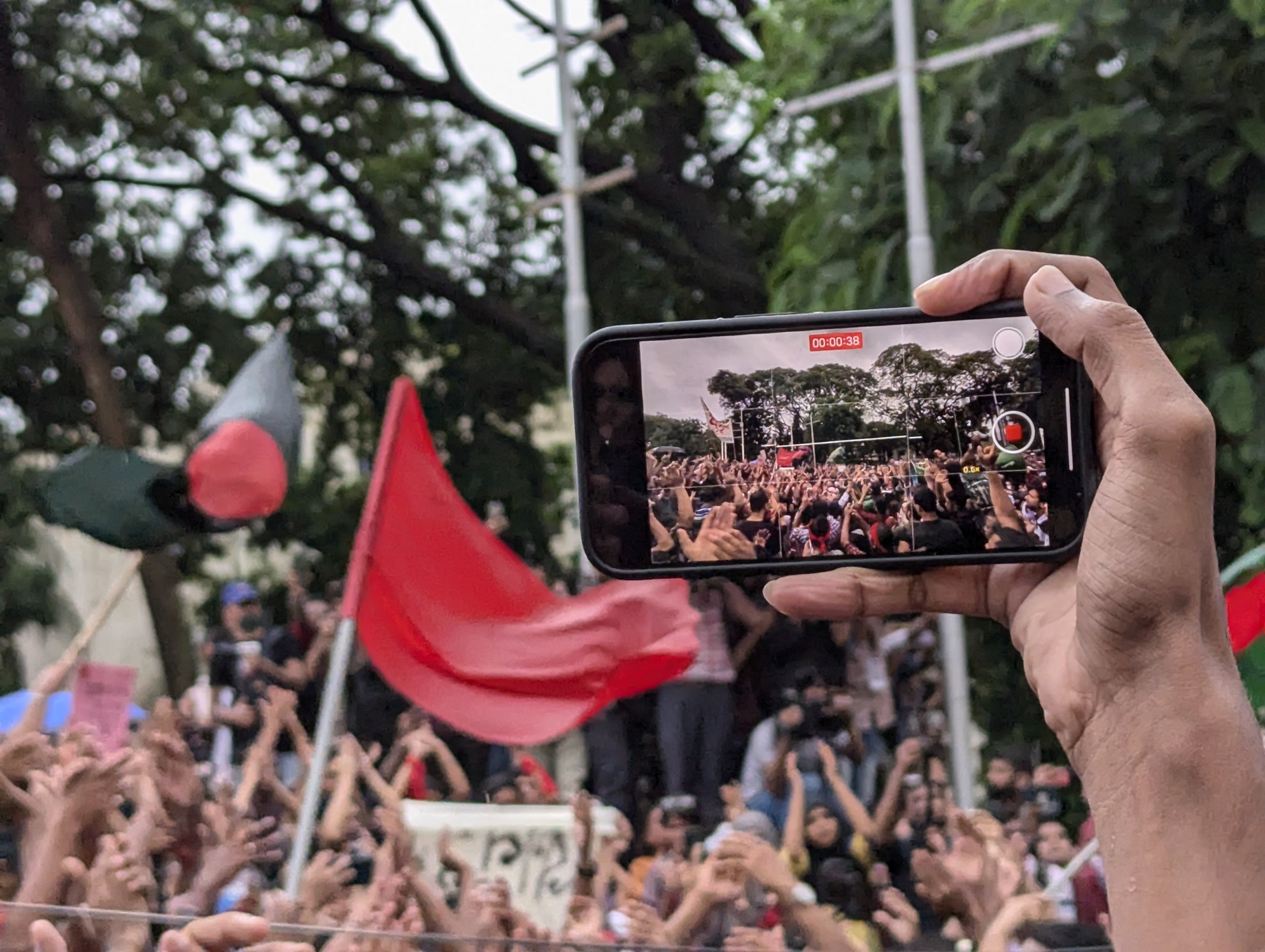
Protesters at Shaheed Minar, Dhaka during "Remembering the Heroes" march

==== 29 July ====
Protesters resumed large-scale demonstrations across various regions of the country after the government ignored an ultimatum to release their leaders. Police arrested 2,822 students in Dhaka.

University professors across Bangladesh, under the "Anti-Repression Teachers Rally" banner, have called for an end to student harassment and mass arrests. They demanded the release of detained students and expressed solidarity with ongoing student protests. The rally, held at Dhaka University's Aparajeyo Bangla on July 29, 2024, began with a moment of silence for students killed in the recent quota reform movement, which the teachers labelled the July massacre.

==== 30 July ====
A cabinet meeting chaired by Prime Minister Sheikh Hasina on 29 July declared that nationwide mourning would be observed on 30 July to honour those killed during the quota reform movement. While Awami League leaders posted black profile pictures on Facebook, many users in Bangladesh chose red, rejecting the official mourning as a farce and declaring they will mourn only when justice is served for the dead students.

At a press conference held at the Dhaka Reporters Unity, several prominent citizens, including Iftekharuzzaman, executive director of Transparency International Bangladesh; Rizwana Hasan, Chief Executive of the Bangladesh Environmental Lawyers Association (BELA); and Asif Nazrul, Professor of Law at University of Dhaka, issued a 24-hour ultimatum for the unconditional release of the six coordinators of the Students Against Discrimination movement currently in Detective Branch (DB) custody.

==== 31 July ====
On 31 July, the Students Against Discrimination organized a nationwide protest named "March for Justice" in response to the series of killings, mass arrests, attacks, lawsuits, enforced disappearances, and murders of students and citizens. Abdul Hannan Masud, one of the coordinators of the movement, confirmed the event. The protest was scheduled to take place at 12 pm across court premises, campuses, and streets nationwide, advocating for nine specific demands of the students. The movement sought the support and cooperation of teachers, lawyers, human rights activists, professionals, workers, and citizens.

At 11:20, students from Shahjalal University of Science and Technology (SUST) and other educational institutions in Sylhet marched from the university gate towards Court Point in support of the protest.

By 11:00, protesters began assembling at the Chittagong Court premises. Despite police barricades, around 200 protesters entered the premises and staged a sit-in. A group of 50 to 60 pro-BNP lawyers stood in solidarity with the students, while pro-Awami League lawyers conducted a counter-march. The protest in Chittagong concluded around 15:15 with a march from the court premises to the New Market intersection.

Around 13:15, students from BUET, the University of Dhaka, and several other universities marched towards the High Court. Their progress was halted by the police near the Bangladesh Shishu Academy, resulting in the detention of several students. In response, the students gathered at Doel Square, later joined by teachers from Dhaka University's White Panel. The protest in Dhaka ended around 15:00 after nearly three hours of demonstration.

From 12:20 to 13:00, University of Rajshahi students blocked the Dhaka-Rajshahi Highway as part of the protest. Police detained five students from the university during the demonstration.

At 15:00, after being shut down for 13 days, Facebook, WhatsApp and other social media platforms were reopened.

==== 1 August ====
In memory of those killed, injured, and tortured by police during the 2024 quota reform movement, the Students Against Discrimination announced a nationwide program titled "Remembering the Heroes" on 1 August. This announcement was made in a press release signed by Rifat Rashid, one of the co-coordinators of the Students Against Discrimination, on 31 July. Additionally, he called for online and offline campaigns in support of the movement and memory of the martyrs, using the hashtags #JulyMassacre and #RememberingOurHeroes on social media platforms.

At 12:30 p.m., teachers and students of Jahangirnagar University held a protest song rally and cultural gathering to protest the attacks on Dhaka University teachers, the mass arrests of protesting students and citizens, and the harassment through false cases. In solidarity with the movement, twelve teachers from the Daffodil International University also participated in the JU event.

After the 24-hour ultimatum for the unconditional release of the six coordinators of the quota reform movement expired, several prominent citizens, including Iftekharuzzaman, Rizwana Hasan, and Asif Nazrul, announced that they would go to the DB office on the afternoon of 1 August.

The government banned the Bangladesh Jamaat-e-Islami, its student wing, the Bangladesh Islami Chhatra Shibir and its associated bodies citing anti-terrorism laws following their involvement in the protests. So far, 274 cases have been filed against students in various police stations in Dhaka Metropolitan. In these cases, up to the morning of 1 August, 3,011 students have been arrested by the Dhaka Metropolitan Police.

The police released six student leaders as the government looked to calm tensions and forestall fresh demonstrations. Upon being released from the DB office, several coordinators announced that they would continue the movement and shared their statements on social media.

In Narayanganj, the Candlelight Vigil program organized in support of "Remembering the Heroes" was disrupted by police intervention. During this time, the police baton-charged the students, injuring at least ten.

==== 2 August ====
Protesters in Rangpur chanting "ছি ছি হাসিনা, লজ্জায় বাঁচিনা" (transl. What a shame Hasina! Can't live with this shame!)

The protesters sought justice for victims affected by the unrest and police crackdown following the release of student leaders. This release did not alleviate public anger, leading to renewed protests. Demonstrators demanded the reopening of schools and universities across the country and, called for Sheikh Hasina's resignation. Clashes occurred as police fired rubber bullets, tear gas shells, and sound grenades in several locations, including Uttara, Khulna, Sylhet, and Habiganj. One police officer was beaten to death by protesters in Khulna, while one civilian died in Habiganj.

Due to the renewed unrest, internet service providers again restricted access to Facebook, WhatsApp, and Telegram. After five hours of restriction, access to Facebook and Messenger were reopened; however Telegram remained restricted.

On the same day, the six coordinators, previously detained by the Detective Branch, said they were coerced into withdrawing from the movement, alleging that the statement was obtained under duress for national broadcast.

Following the ongoing violence and sabotage incidents centered around the quota reform movement, 78 HSC candidates arrested in related cases were granted bail from various courts nationwide. Among them, 55 were from the Dhaka Division, 14 from the Chittagong Division, six from the Khulna Division, and three from the Rangpur Division.

UNICEF expressed concern over the deaths of at least 32 children during the protest crackdown. Sanjay Wijesekera, UNICEF Regional Director for South Asia, urged swift measures to ensure the children can return to school.

=== End of the movement ===
==== 3 August ====
In the early hours of the day, an injured person died while receiving treatment.

As a last resort to quell the protests, Sheikh Hasina proposed peaceful talks with the protesters, stating that her office was open and expressing a desire to "sit with the quota protesters and listen to them." However, central coordinator Nahid Islam announced that the protesters had no plans to negotiate with the government. He added that they had endured torture while in police custody and had resorted to a hunger strike while detained by police and the Detective Branch. Asif Mahmud, another coordinator of the Students Against Discrimination, stated, "There is no dialogue with bullets and terrorism."

Around 10:30 a.m., students from various educational institutions in Rajshahi marched and gathered in front of the Rajshahi University of Engineering and Technology (RUET), chanting slogans. The students took to the streets demanding the resignation of Sheikh Hasina.

Students and ordinary people gathered at the Shaheed Minar, Dhaka area with protest marches from different parts of the capital, At around 5:30 p.m., Nahid Islam, one of the coordinators, addressed the assembled crowd at Shaheed Minar. where the Students Against Discrimination announced a single demand for the resignation of Sheikh Hasina and her cabinet and called for a comprehensive non-cooperation movement from 4 August, which marked the end of the quota protests.

The court granted bail to Arif Sohel, a coordinator of the Students Against Discrimination, who remained in jail despite the decision.

In Chittagong, there was an attack on the residence of Education Minister Mohibul Hasan Chowdhury. During this incident, two cars parked in front of the house were vandalized, and one of them was set on fire. Earlier, around 5:30 p.m., there was also an attack on the office of Md Mohiuddin Bacchu, the Member of Parliament for Chittagong-10, located in the Lalkhan Bazar. The office was set on fire during the attack. In another incident in Sreepur, Gazipur one person was killed during clashes between police and protesting students.

In Rangpur, two police officers were temporarily suspended in connection with the death of Abu Sayed on 16 July. The two officers are ASI Amir Hossain of Rangpur Police Lines and Constable Sujan Chandra Roy of Tajhat Police Station.

During an Student Against Discrimination movement in Sylhet, clashes occurred between the police and the students along with the public. Initial reports indicated that over a hundred people were injured in the conflict.

At around 1:30 p.m. in Race Course, Comilla, leaders and activists of the Chhatra League, Jubo League, and Swechchhasebak League attacked a mass rally of Students Against Discrimination protesters. During the attack, they fired openly at the students, resulting in 10 students being shot and a total of 30 people being injured.

In Bogra, there were repeated clashes between protesting students and the police. From 4 p.m. to around 6 p.m., these confrontations lasted nearly two hours. During the conflict, the police fired tear gas shells, sound grenades, rubber bullets, and shotgun rounds. Several areas of the city, including Satmatha, Circuit House Mor, Romena Afaz Road, Kalibari Mor, Bir Muktijoddha Rezaul Baki Road, and Jailkhana Mor, turned into battlegrounds. At least six students were shot, and an additional 50 students were injured. On this day the movement ended and was succeeded by the Non-cooperation movement.

Following the overthrow of the Awami League, the Revolutionary Workers Party of Bangladesh organised a student assembly to meet with the interim government and consult on the policies of said government, meeting with parties like the BNP.

== Aftermath ==
=== Mass killing ===
The massacre was the violent suppression and mass killings in Bangladesh during the July Revolution from 16 July to 5 August 2024. It is triggered by the reinstatement of a controversial quota system and widespread public dissatisfaction, the crackdown was carried out by the government led by the Awami League, its affiliated groups such as the Chhatra League, and various law-enforcement agencies.

=== Supreme Court verdict ===
With the deterioration of the law and order situation in the country, Minister of Law Anisul Haque conferred with the Attorney General AM Amin Uddin about appealing to the court for a hearing of the case on July 21.

On the same day, the Appellate Division of Supreme Court ordered an overhaul of the quota reservation system. It ordered 93% of recruitment in government jobs to be based on merit and 5% to be reserved for the children of freedom fighters, martyred freedom fighters and Biranganas, 1% for the ethnic minorities and 1% for the third gender and the disabled people with immediate effect. Accordingly, on 23 July, the Ministry of Public Administration published a gazette notification in line with the Supreme Court verdict. In the post-gazette news conference, Anisul Huq said the new quota system will be followed while recruiting employees directly in all government, semi-government, autonomous and semi-autonomous institutions, statutory bodies and different corporations.

Despite the ruling, student protesters pledged to continue demonstrating for other demands such as the release of people imprisoned during the protests and the resignations of officials deemed responsible for the violence that occurred with it.

=== Non-cooperation movement ===
Prime Minister Sheikh Hasina proposed peaceful talks with the protesters, saying,

"The doors of Ganabhaban are open. I want to sit with the quota protesters and listen to them. I do not want conflict."

— Sheikh Hasina

However, in the afternoon, central coordinator Nahid Islam announced that they had no plans to negotiate with the government. He stated:

When we were in DB custody, we were offered to sit in talks with the Prime Minister. But we protested against this proposal by going on a hunger strike in DB custody.

— Nahid Islam

Asif Mahmud, a coordinator of the Student Against Discrimination, commented:

We have no plans to negotiate with them. Our demands are very clear. If they have any statements, they can present them to the nation through the media. The decision of the protesting students and people is our decision. There is no dialogue with bullets and terrorism.

— Asif Mahmud

Students and ordinary people gathered at the Shaheed Minar, Dhaka area with protest marches from different parts of the capital, At around 5:30 PM, Nahid Islam, one of the coordinator, addressed the assembled crowd at Shaheed Minar. where the Students Against Discrimination announced a single demand for the resignation of Prime Minister Sheikh Hasina and her cabinet and called for a comprehensive Non-cooperation movement from 4 August, which marked the end of the quota protests.

== Casualties and damages ==
District-wise death tolls in July Revolution

=== Casualties ===
The mass killings carried out by the law enforcement agencies were described as "July massacre" in various sources. A preliminary report by the Office of the United Nations High Commissioner for Human Rights published on 16 August 2024 stated that more than 400 fatalities were reported nationwide between 16 July and 4 August, mainly due to violence carried out by state forces such as the Bangladesh Police, RAB, BGB and Army, as well as the Chhatra League. The report stated that restrictions on communication and state interference in hospitals make this figure an undercount. According to UNICEF, at least 32 children died during the protest crackdown surrounding the protests and unrest in July. Prothom Alo found that out of the 354 people killed it had counted during the protests, 39 were children.

==== During Bangla Blockade ====
Six people were reported killed on 17 July: Md. Shahjahan, a 25-year-old hawker from the New Market area; Md. Farooq, a 32-year-old employee of a furniture shop; Md. Wasim Akram, a 22-year-old student of the Sociology Department at Chittagong College and an activist of Chatra Dal; Faisal Ahmed Shanto, a 24-year-old student of Omargani M.E.S. College; Sabuj Ali, a 25-year-old member of the Chhatra League and a student of Dhaka College; and most notably, Abu Sayed, a 25-year-old student of the Department of English at Begum Rokeya University.

==== During Complete Shutdown ====
At least eleven people were reported killed on 18 July, of which only three of which have had their names released: Siyam, an 18-year old worker at a battery shop in Gulistan; Dipta Dey, a 21-year-old second-year student of Madaripur Government College; and Farhan Faiyaz, a 17-year-old student of Dhaka Residential Model College.

Another four were killed in a clash between the police at Uttara, including two students of Northern University, while one was killed in Narsingdi in a clash between police and students.

=== Damages ===
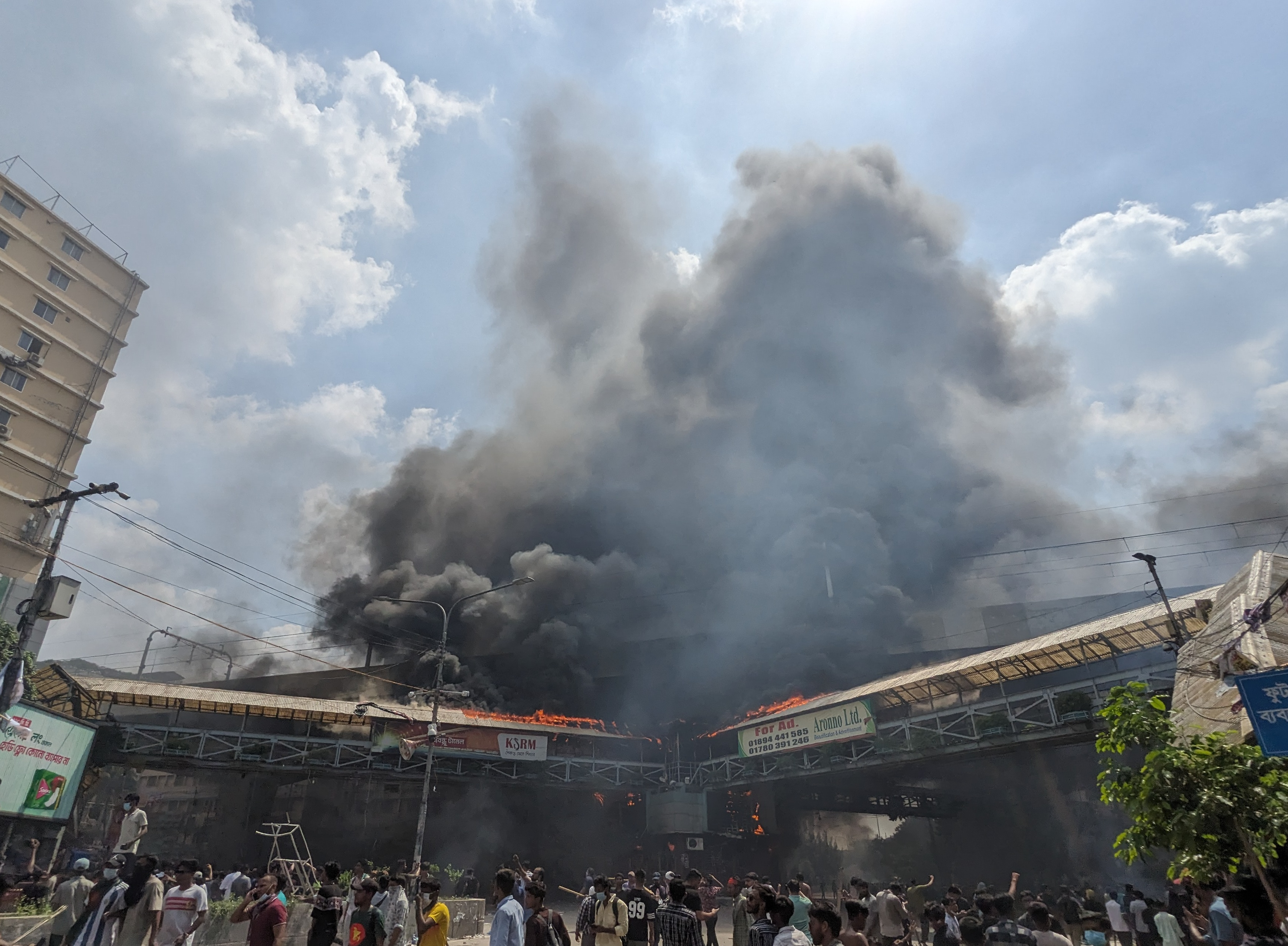
Mirpur-10 police box set ablaze by the agitators

The movement resulted in huge damage of various state properties in Bangladesh. According to a report by Bangladesh Sangbad Sangstha, at least thirty major state establishments experienced arson and severe damage. The state broadcaster, Bangladesh Television (BTV), was attacked and set on fire on 18 July 2024. The building suffered extensive damage, with several sections completely burnt. Sheikh Hasina visited the site and expressed deep sorrow over the incident. A major data center in Dhaka was set on fire, causing severe disruptions to internet and telecom services across the country and the loss of 70–80% of the country's bandwidth. Arsons also occurred in the toll stations of Dhaka Elevated Expressway and Mayor Mohammed Hanif Flyover, and two Dhaka Metro stations, including the Mirpur-10 station. Footage of Sheikh Hasina visiting the station and shedding tears on 25 July was criticised on social media, with users accusing her of failing to react similarly to the loss of life during the protests.

According to Bangladesh Police, 235 police infrastructures and 281 vehicles were vandalized and set on fire. On 19 July, a violent attack on Narsingdi District Jail resulted in a massive jailbreak. Armed assailants, allegedly linked to Jamaat-e-Islami and BNP by the government, stormed the prison, set fires, and broke open cell locks, allowing 826 prisoners, including nine militants, to escape. The attackers looted weapons, ammunition, and food supplies while causing extensive damage to the facility. Several prison guards were killed during the attack, and the attackers fled with the escaped prisoners.

Bangladesh's economy suffered losses of over $1.2 billion as a result of the nationwide curfew and protests. Among the industries greatly affected were ready-made garments, steelmaking, pharmaceuticals, ceramics and outsourcing and e-commerce.

== Mass arrests and detentions ==
The Bangladesh Police including Detective Branch (DB) and RAB arrested a large number of student protesters and members of opposition political parties. As of July 30, the total count reached over 9600. (Note: As of July 31, 2024, 86.84% of those detained in Dhaka were protester and non-protester without any political affiliation, whereas 13.15% of those were members of various opposition parties. Police arrest people from protests and also from block raids at night after shutting down electricity and internet at targeted areas. Police also arrest random passersby from the street especially targeting students, for Facebook posts and showing farewell hand gesture to helicopter.) On 23 July, plainclothes police arrest a non-protester HSC examinee after failing to find his elder brother. On 26 July, plainclothes police officers detained three protest coordinators, namely Nahid Islam, Asif Mahmud and Abu Baker Majumder from Gonoshasthaya Kendra hospital. The three were receiving medical treatment for injuries they received from alleged beatings and torture while in prior police custody. On 27 July, DB detained protest coordinators Sarjis Alam and Hasnat Abdullah. On July 28, plainclothes police detained two more protest coordinators, namely Nusrat Tabassum and Arif Shohel. These detained coordinators but Arif Shohel are the one who issued a statement from the DB office announcing the withdrawal of the protests. However, other coordinators of the Students Against Discrimination alleged that these individuals had been coerced by the DB into making the statement. The remaining coordinators announced to continue their protest. After missing for days Arif Shohel and Asif Mahtab Utsha, a former teacher of BRAC University placed six-day remand each. On July 29, police arrested at least 34 protesters including coordinators.

On July 20, Nurul Haq Nur, associated with the 2018 Bangladesh quota reform movement, was arrested by police on charges of involvement in the 18 July arson attack on Setu Bhaban, although there were claims he was not involved. Some observers viewed the arrest as politically motivated. (Note: The court denied him bail and ordered his detention following a 5-day remand. According to his wife, who spoke to the media, Nur was in good health before his arrest. Upon his release from remand on 26 July, he appeared to be in significant pain and unable to stand without assistance, suggesting he had been tortured and beaten.) Bangladeshi law mandates that an arrested person must be presented in court within 24 hours; failure to do so is considered an enforced disappearance. According to Nur's wife, he was unaccounted for 40 hours before being brought to court, raising questions about the legality of his detention. She also alleged that Nur was tortured by law enforcers while in remand.

On 27 July, Hasanatul Islam Faiyaz, a 17-year-old, was presented in a lower court in Dhaka and placed on a seven-day remand. He was the 16th of 17 individuals charged in connection with the killing of a police officer near Matuail Hospital during the protests. The charges included murder, concealment of the body, and theft of the officer's motorcycle. Although the case file listed Faiyaz's age as 19, his birth certificate confirmed he was 17, born on 19 April 2007. On July 28, the Chief Metropolitan Magistrate Court Judge Tahmina Haque canceled the remand order following an appeal, citing the incorrect age in the case file which violates UNCRC and the "Children's Act, 2013".

== Controversies ==
=== Razakar remarks ===
Students of the University of Rajshahi using the Razakar slogans on 14 July 2024 at 11:30 p.m. (BST)

On 14 July, during a press conference, Sheikh Hasina responded to a question about the anti-quota protests stating,

If the grandchildren of freedom fighters don't get quota benefits, will those then go to the grandchildren of the Razakars? That's my question to the countrymen.

Razakars were a Bengali paramilitary force during the Bangladesh Liberation War which collaborated with the Pakistani Armed Forces to halt the independence of Bangladesh. In modern-day Bangladesh, the term razakar is used as a pejorative, meaning "traitor" or "collaborator", similar to the usage of "Quisling" in the Western World. Using the term razakar can be highly insulting in Bangladesh.

In response to Sheikh Hasina's comment, in the early hours of 15 July, students began using new slogans out of anger such as,

"তুমি কে, আমি কে? রাজাকার, রাজাকার! কে বলেছে, কে বলেছে? স্বৈরাচার, স্বৈরাচার!"
(lit. 'Who are you? Who am I? A Razakar, a Razakar! Who has said it? Who has said it? The Autocrat, the Autocrat!') (Note: In some version, সরকার (lit. 'Government') is used instead of স্বৈরাচার (lit. 'Autocrat').)

"চাইতে গেলাম অধিকার, হয়ে গেলাম রাজাকার!"
(lit. 'Sought for rights, got turned into a Razakar!') (Note: In some version, চেয়েছিলাম is used instead of চাইতে গেলাম but the meaning remains unchanged.)

Protesters argued that the Prime Minister's statement indirectly labelled them as "Razakars" and demeaned them for advocating for quota reform, which led them to adopt the slogan.

The Bangladesh Chhatra League, the student wing of the ruling party Awami League, threatened that any protester using these slogans would face consequences, as they viewed these actions as something offensive to the spirit of the liberation war and freedom fighters. It also announced plans to take action if the usage of these slogans continued. In light of these events, Sheikh Hasina questioned the education of the protesters.

=== Usage of UN-marked vehicles ===
Bangladesh Armed Forces used United Nations marked vehicles including APCs during a curfew imposed by the government. Spokesperson of the UN secretary general, Stéphane Dujarric expressed concern over reports of UN-marked vehicles being used during the protests and stated that such vehicles should only be used for official UN peacekeeping or political missions, adding that he had raised the issue to the Bangladeshi government. As of 1 August 2024, the United Nations continues to engage with the Bangladesh Army for its peacekeeping missions, with Bangladesh contributing the third-largest number of troops globally, totalling 5,614 personnel. This engagement persists despite ongoing concerns and reports regarding the country's governance practices. On 24 June, Foreign Minister Hasan Mahmud told reporters that some vehicles were "rented to the UN peace mission" and the authorities had forgotten to remove the logos. It is speculated that Bangladesh and its military may face potential sanctions from the Western countries and scrutiny from the International Criminal Court for deploying UN-marked vehicles to target unarmed protesters.

== Reactions ==
=== Domestic ===
==== Support ====
Bangladesh's largest opposition party, the Bangladesh Nationalist Party, denounced the Chhatra League attacks on the protesters. The Left Democratic Alliance also denounced the suppressions saying, "the government is delivering provocative speeches instead of recognizing logical changes in the quota system."

Thirty eminent citizens of the country condemned the loss of lives in violent clashes during the protests. Non-governmental organization Transparency International Bangladesh also denounced the suppressions.

In an interview published on 14 August, nine days after the resignation of Sheikh Hasina, her son and the former IT advisor Sajeeb Wazed expressed that the stand of the fifth Hasina ministry on the quota system was wrong and they should have supported the protesters from the first.

==== Oppose ====
Muhammad Zafar Iqbal, a renowned Bangladeshi author and former professor at Shahjalal University of Science and Technology, remarked that he would not like to visit Dhaka University again, claiming he would see the "Razakars" in the students. This statement sparked immense outrage and controversy among the supporters and the participants in the quota reform movement. Many online bookshops, including Rokomari.com, announced they would no longer sell or promote his literary works, removing his books from their websites. Similarly, students of the university declared him a persona non grata.

=== International ===
- United States: State Department spokesperson Matthew Miller condemned the attacks on protesters by the Chhatra League. However, the spokesperson of the Ministry of Foreign Affairs of Bangladesh, Saheli Sabrin, called Miller's remarks "unsubstantiated claims". Congressman Andy Kim condemned the violence by the government against the student protestors.
- United Kingdom: The Foreign, Commonwealth and Development Office stated its concerns about the violence following protests and urged both sides to "end the violence and find a peaceful way forward".
- China: The Chinese Foreign Ministry stated on August 1 that the situation in Bangladesh has stabilized and social order has resumed, expressing satisfaction as a "close neighbour" following the recent protests and casualties.
- India: Minister of External Affairs, Subrahmanyam Jaishankar said he was closely following the situation in Bangladesh. In its official press briefing, the Ministry of External Affairs described the events as Bangladesh's 'internal matter' and expressed the Indian government's commitment to protect Indian citizens living in Bangladesh.
- United Nations: Secretary General António Guterres expressed his concerns and urged the government to ensure a conducive environment for dialogue and encouraged protesters to engage in dialogue to resolve the deadlock. His spokesperson, Stéphane Dujarric expressed concern over reports of UN-marked vehicles being used during the protests and stated that such vehicles should only be used for official UN peacekeeping or political missions, adding that he had raised the issue to the Bangladeshi government. United Nations High Commissioner for Human Rights Volker Türk urged the government to engage with student protesters and to stop the violence.
- Germany: A foreign ministry spokesperson emphasises that it is important that Bangladesh remain democratic amid the unrest in the country.
- European Union: Ambassador to Bangladesh Charles Whiteley stated that he "wants to see a quick resolution of present situation" and urges the government for "avoidance of further violence and bloodshed". EU Foreign Policy chief Josep Borrell condemned the "excessive use of force" against protesters and called for accountability and respect for human rights. He emphasized the need for an investigation into the deaths, arrests, and property damage.

=== Organisations ===
Human Rights Watch urged the Bangladeshi government to "end the crisis, punish those committing serious crimes, and protect" protesting students. They also called for increased scrutiny of Bangladeshi security forces by the UK and the EU.

UNICEF expressed concerns over the death of 32 children in the protests. Sanjay Wijesekera, UNICEF Regional Director for South Asia, urged swift measures to ensure that children can return to school.

The All India Students Association denounced the violence and expressed their solidarity with student protesters. The Awami Ittehad Party also condemned the violence and urged safety for the Indian nationals residing there.

Amnesty International condemned the attacks against protesters and called on the government "to immediately guarantee the safety of all peaceful protesters and proper treatment of all those injured".

Ma Thida, Chair of PEN International's Writers in Prison Committee, condemned the violence and called on the Bangladesh government to protect journalists and ensure their freedom of expression.

International Federation for Human Rights and Odhikar urged the government to investigate the law enforcement crackdown and hold officers accountable for unnecessary or disproportionate force. They also called for an immediate, independent investigation into attacks on protesters by BCL members.

Célia Mercier, Head of Reporters Without Borders's South Asia Desk, demanded that those responsible for the violent attacks on journalists be identified and brought to justice immediately. She also called on authorities to guarantee the safety of journalists and the right to information.

The digital civil rights NGO Access Now urged the government for unrestricted internet access and transparency during disruptions, with service providers giving prior notification and explanations to users.

== Gallery ==
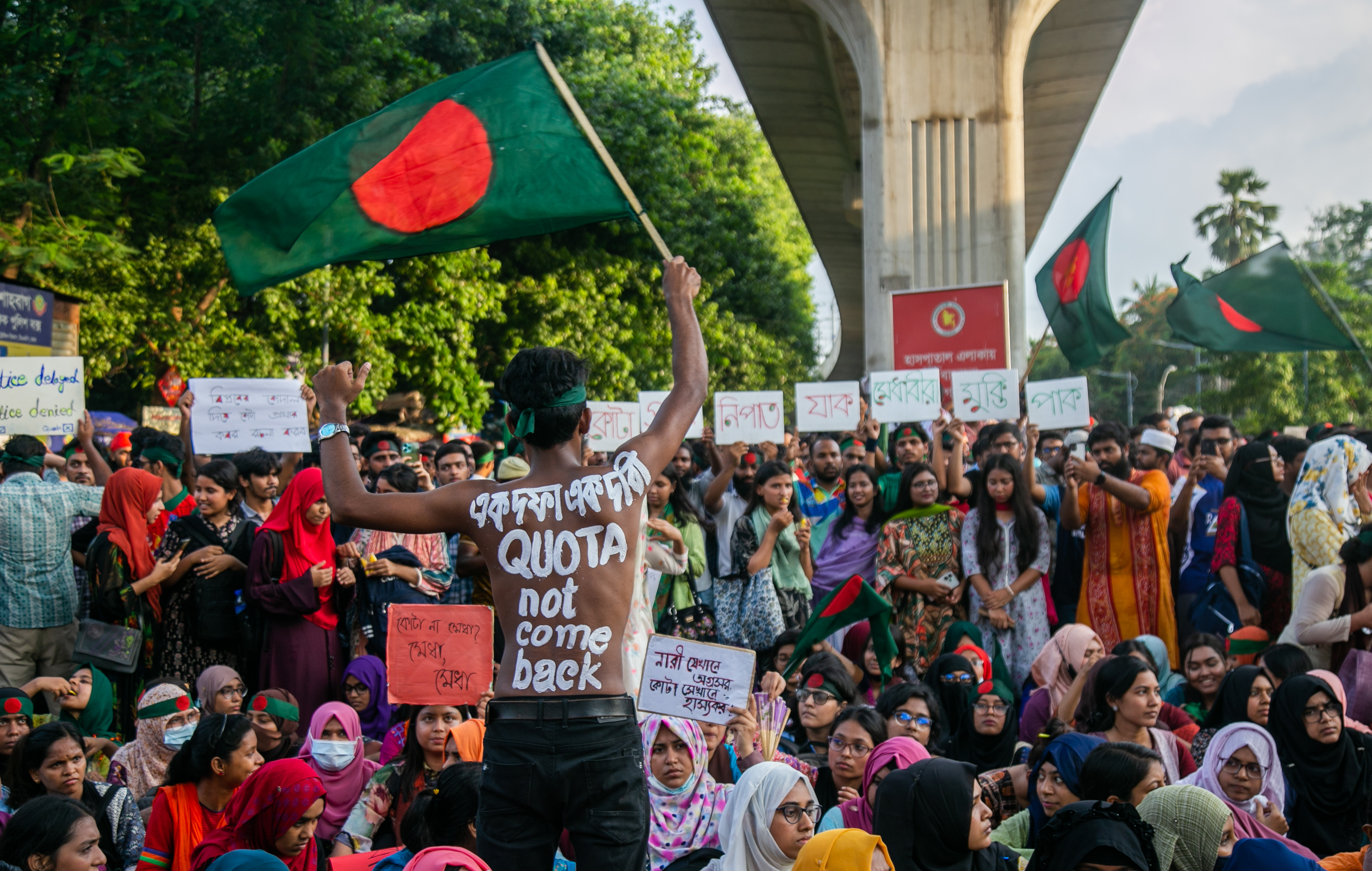

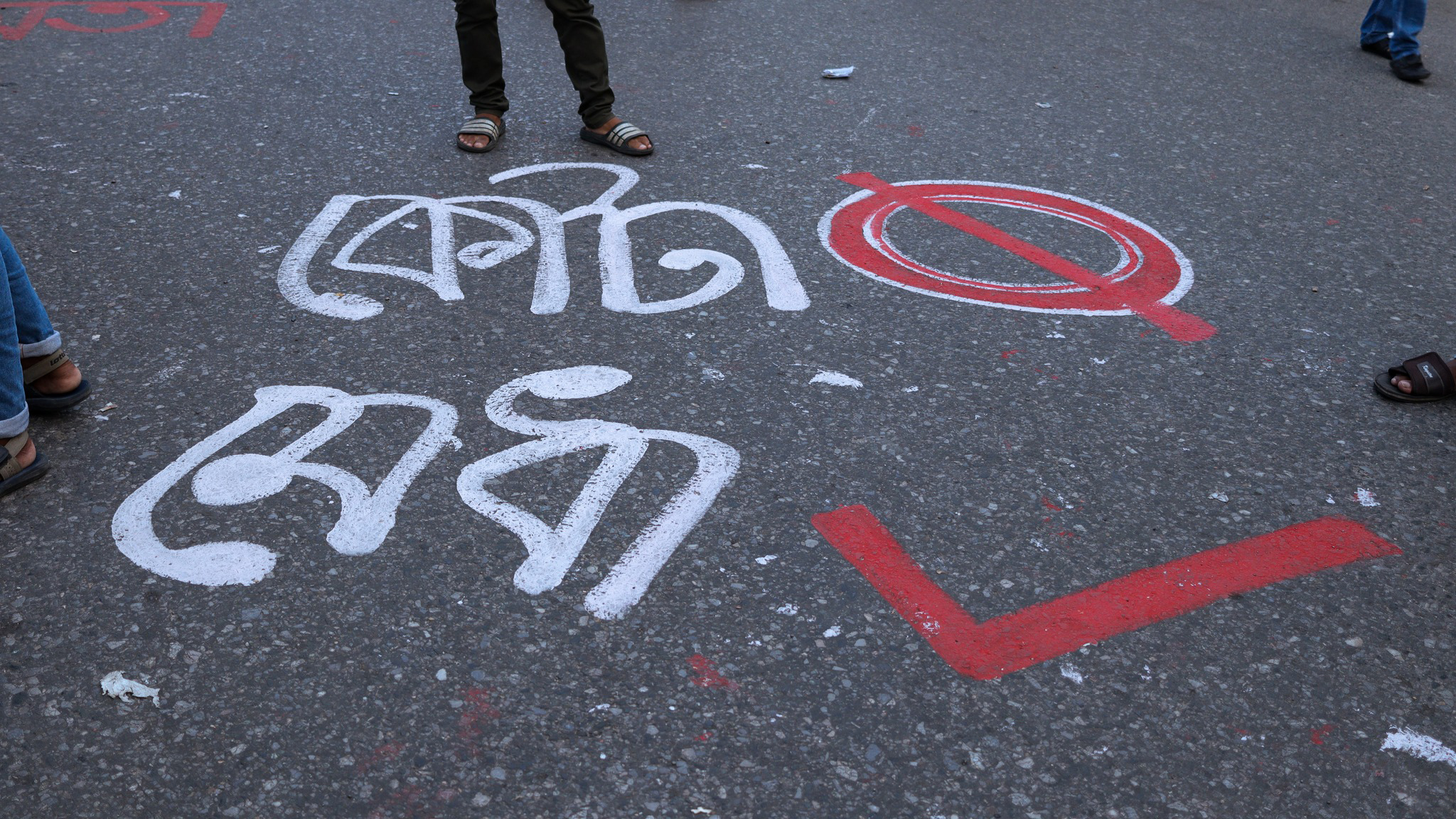

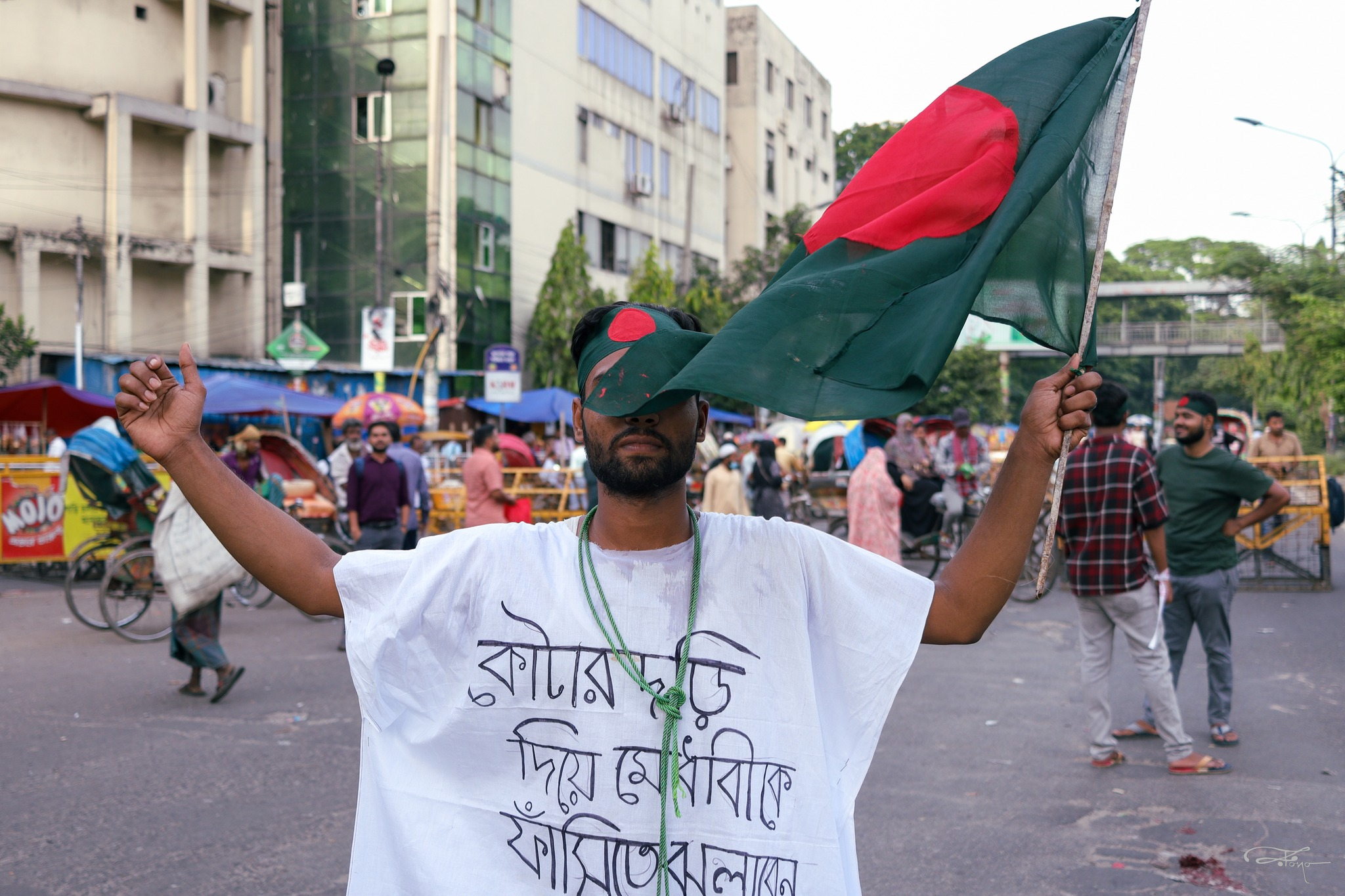

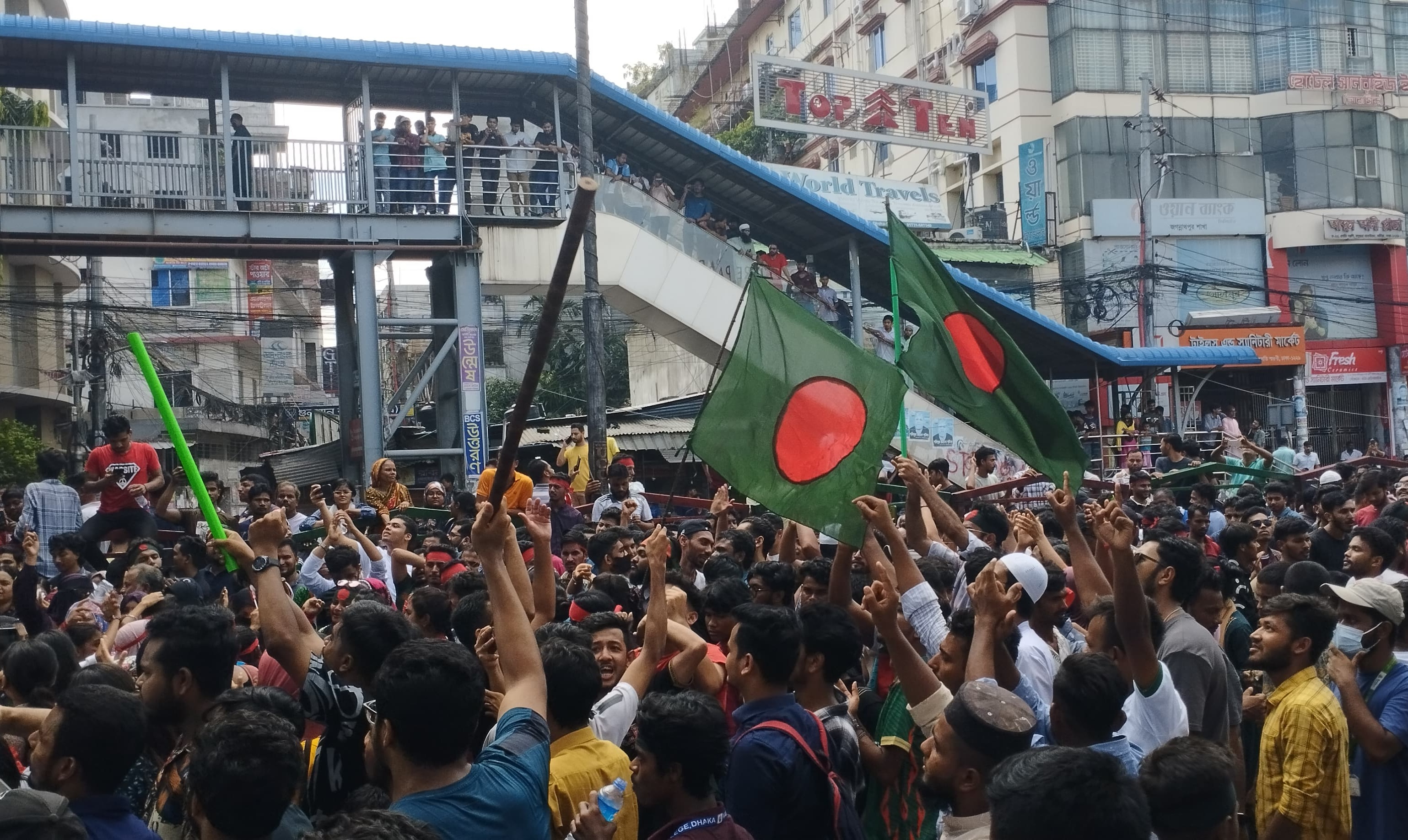

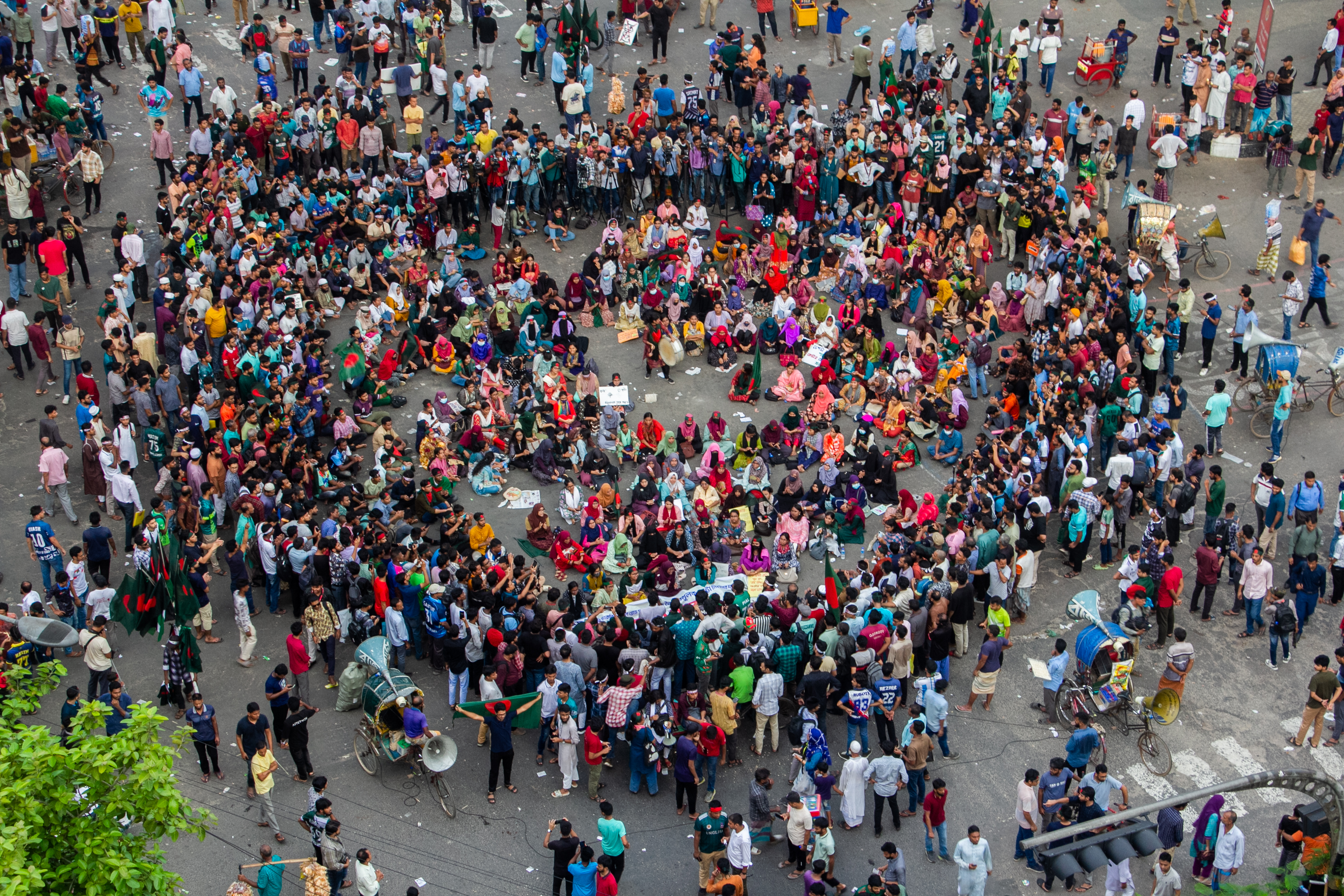

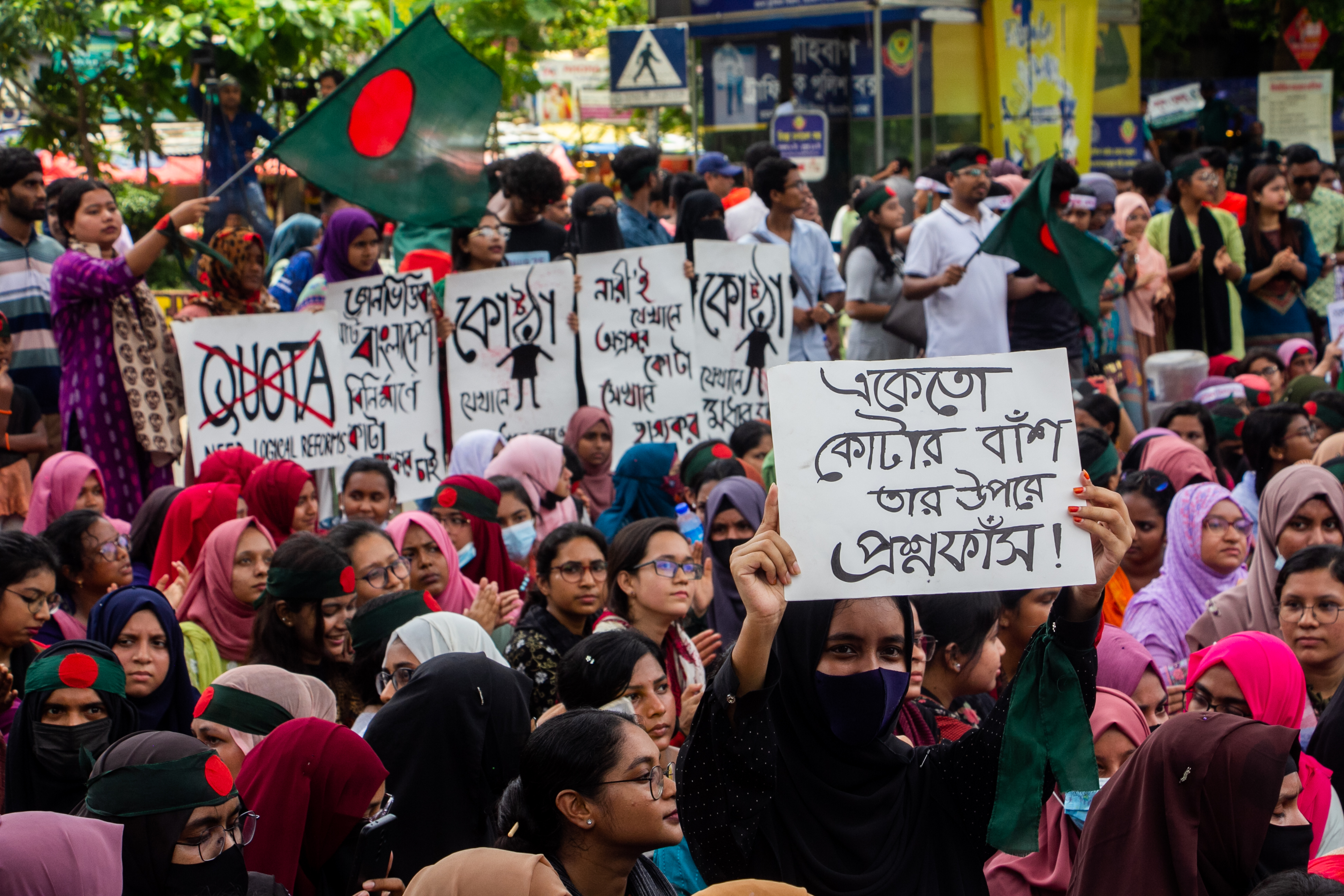

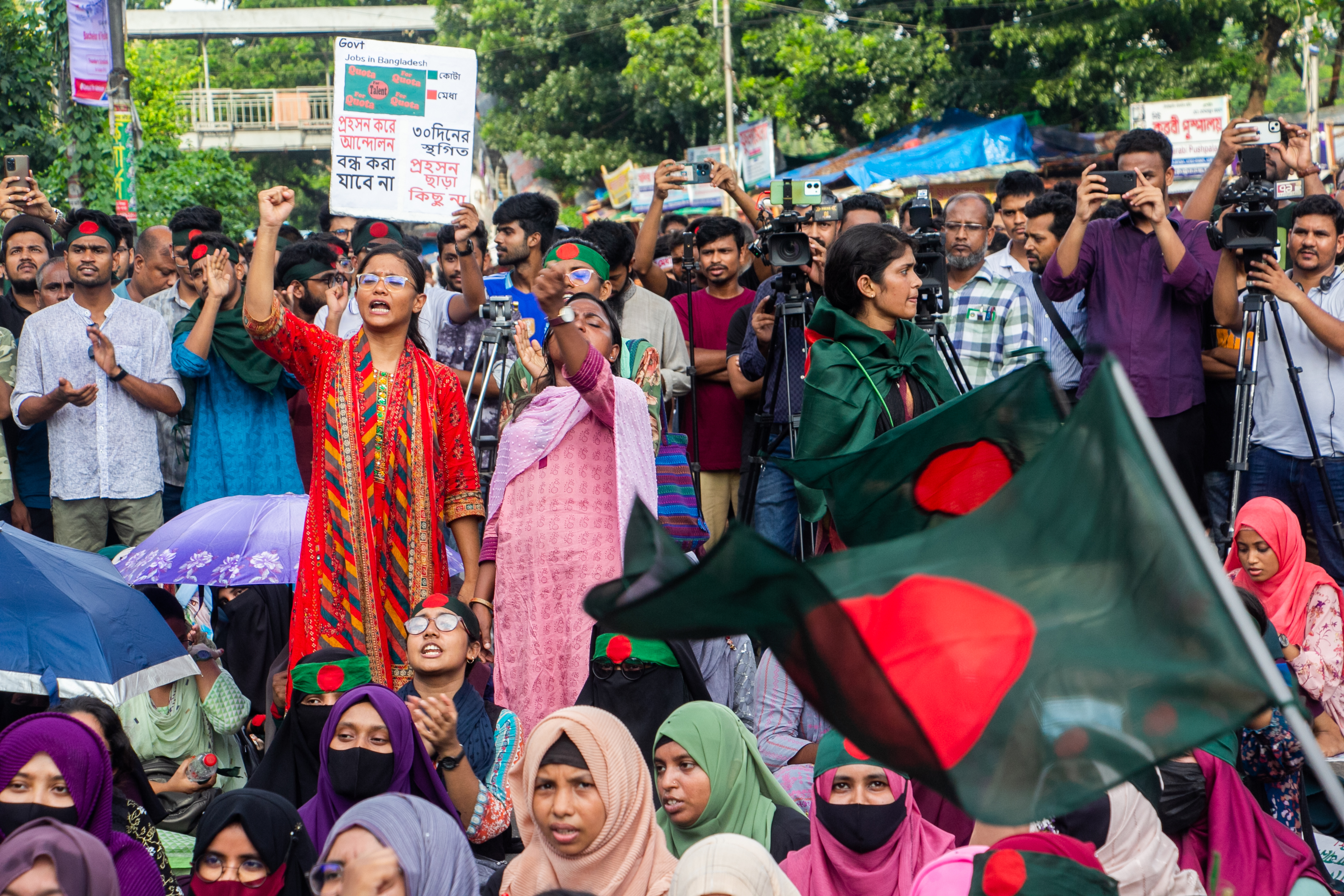

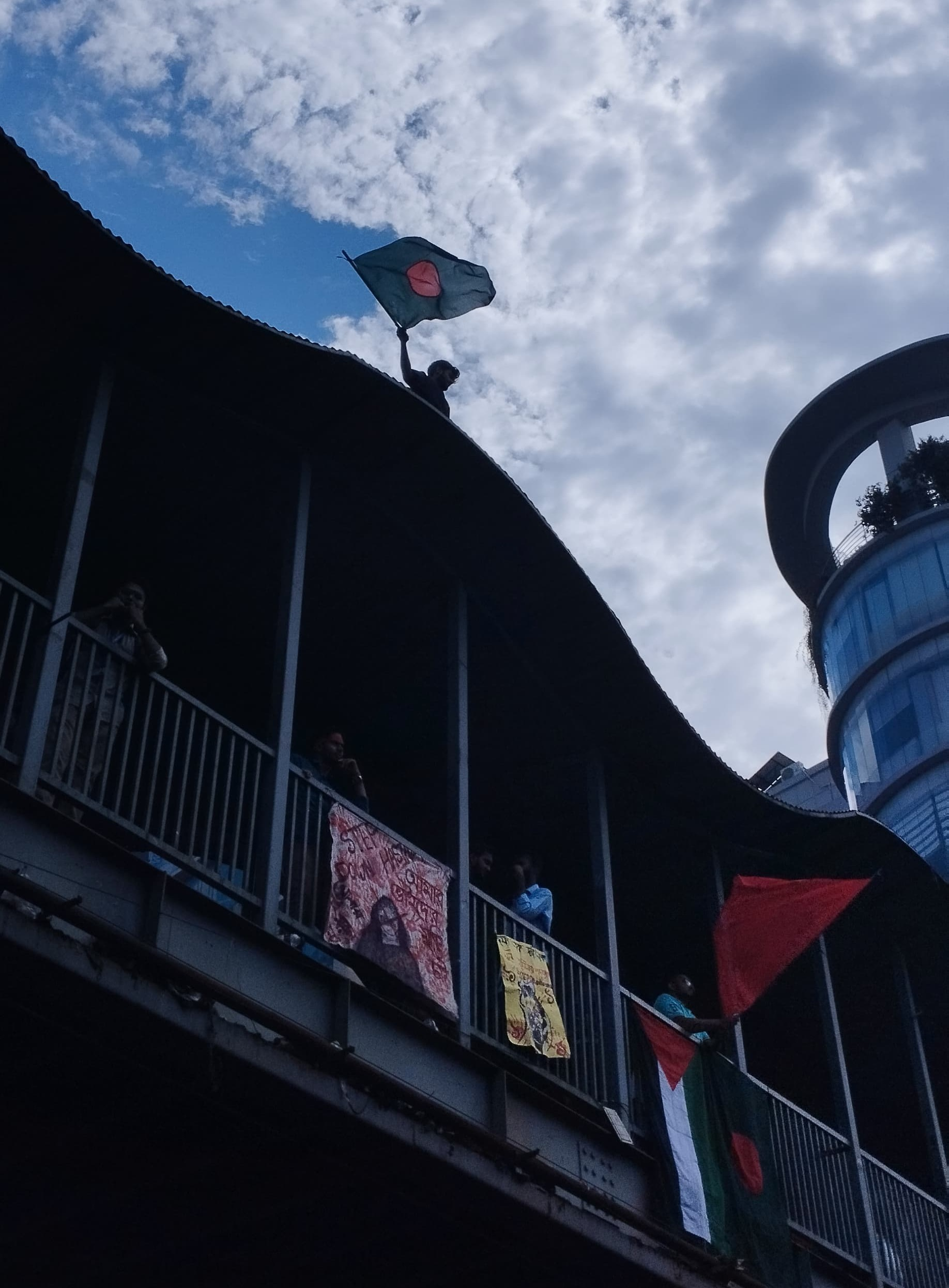

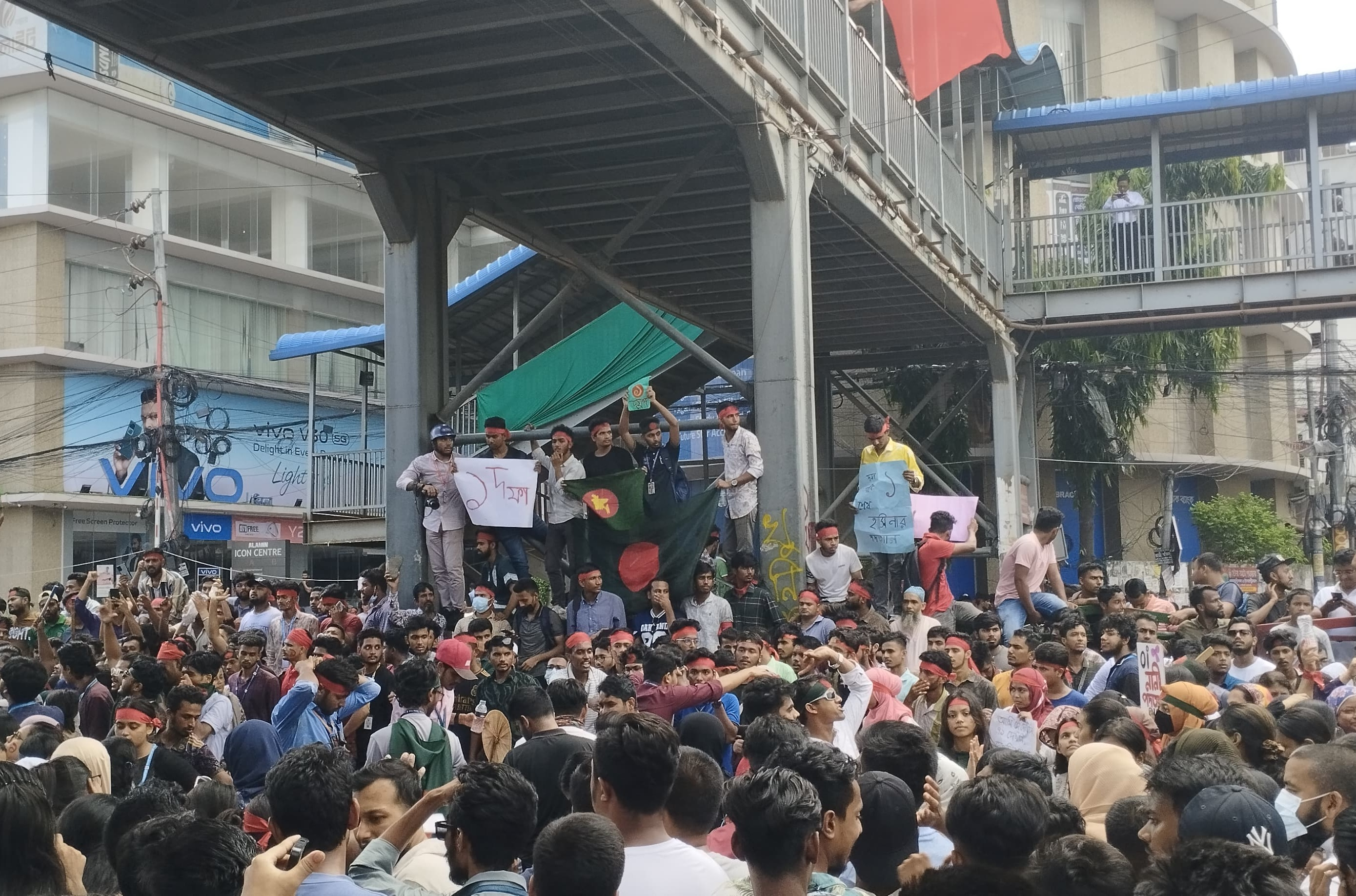

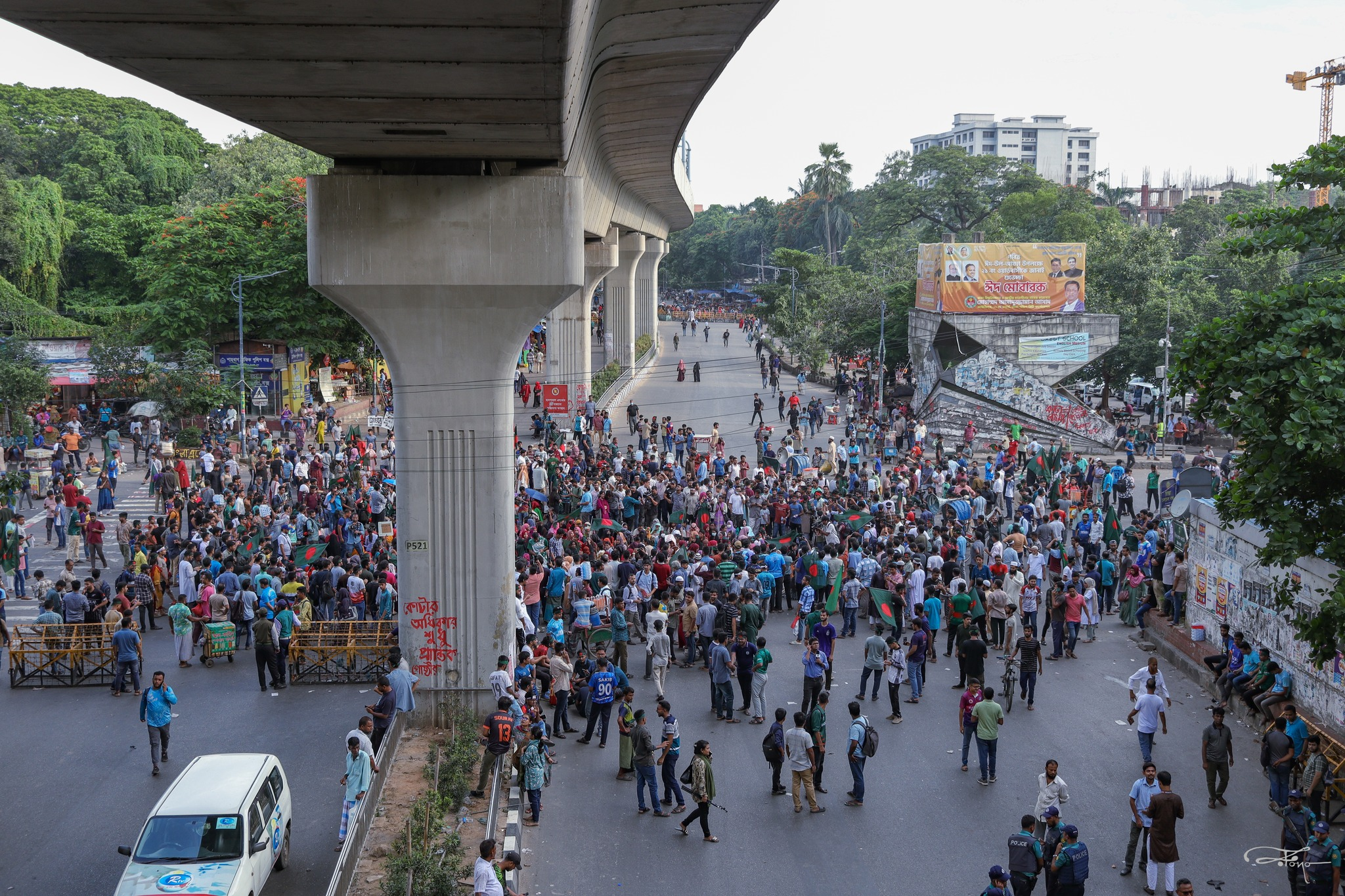

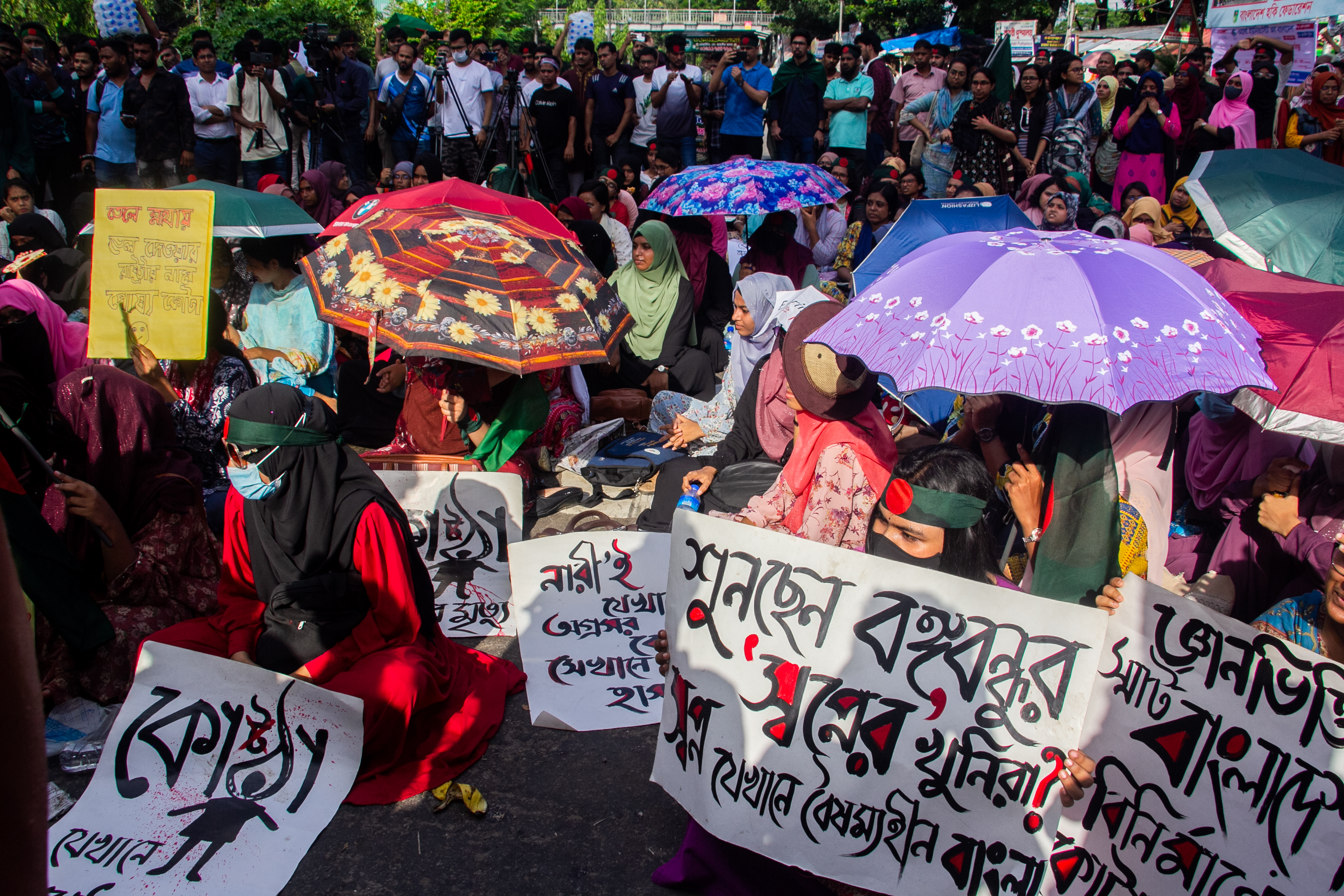

== See also ==
- Non-cooperation movement (2024) – Mass uprising against the government of Bangladesh
- July massacre
- Syrian Revolution
- July Uprising
- Arab Spring – 2010s protests and revolutions in the Arab world
- 1990 Mass Uprising in Bangladesh – Pro-democratic revolution in the South Asian country
- August 2025 Indonesian protests
- 2022 Sri Lankan protests
- Asian Spring
