= Housing Estate, Kushtia =

Housing Estate
- Suburb; Housing area
- Medical College area Housing Central Eidgah

- Location within Khulna division Location within Bangladesh
- Coordinates: 23.892670°N 89.135428°E
- Country: Bangladesh
- Division: Khulna
- District: Kushtia
- Upazila: Kushtia Sadar
- Thana: Kushtia Model
- Mauza: Kalishankarpur; Chourhas; Molla Tegharia
- Project started: 1958

Area
  - Total: 1.465 km^{2} (0.566 sq mi)

Population (2022)
  - Total: 12,790
  - Density: 8,730/km^{2} (22,610/sq mi)
- Time zone: UTC+06:00 (Bangladesh Standard Time)
- Postal code: 7000
- Website: bhbfc.kushtia.gov.bd

Housing Estate is a suburb of Kushtia and a planned housing area under the control of the Bangladesh House Building Finance Corporation. Construction of the housing began in the 1960s for refugees and low-income people. It contains a 1971 wartime mass grave site known as the 'Housing Estate Mass Grave' and 'Housing Colony Mass Grave'.

== Geography ==
Housing Estate is located south of Kushtia city and north of Dhaka Road and is included in wards 6, 9 and 12 of the Kushtia Municipality. It extends across parts of the Kalishankarpur, Chourhas and Molla Tegharia mauzas. According to 2021 data, its total area is 362 acres (1.46 km^{2}). However, a newspaper reported in 1966 that a total of 900 acres (3.6 km^{2}) had been allocated for the project.

Housing Estate is bordered by Lahini, Harishankarpur and Kalishankarpur to the east; hourhas ara and Molla Tegharia to the west; Pearatala, district prison and Kalishankarpur to the north; and Molla Tegharia, Lahini and Kushtia Medical to the south.

=== Demographics ===
According to the 2022 Bangladeshi census, Housing Estate has a total of 3,326 households, with a population of 12,790. Of these, 6,328 are male and 6,462 are female.

== Authorities ==
Kushtia is an area under the jurisdiction of the Rajshahi Division under the National Housing Authority's Real Estate Development and Management Act, and one of its housing estates is named 'Kushtia Housing Estate, Kushtia'. There are two field-level offices here under the Superintending Engineer–Rajshahi Circle of the National Housing Authority. These are:

1. Office of the Sub-Divisional Engineer, Kushtia Sub-Division, Kushtia
2. Office of the Administrative Officer, Kushtia

One of the 18 zonal (regional) offices of the Bangladesh House Building Finance Corporation is located in Kushtia and covers areas of Kushtia, Meherpur and Chuadanga districts. The office is located on NS Road in Amlapara.

== History ==
=== East Pakistan ===
Following the Partition of India in 1947, when Kushtia District was formed, Kushtia became a district town. Before attaining district-town status, Kushtia was a subdivision town with some government and private buildings. After attaining the status of a district headquarters, various offices and buildings were established in Kushtia for administrative and other purposes through government and private initiatives. During this period, commercial buildings and small and large industrial establishments were also developed.

Before the Partition of India, the housing problem in Kushtia was not particularly severe. After Partition, thousands of refugees crossed the border from India and took shelter in Kushtia. The city's population increased because of refugees and people arriving in search of employment, and rents in the city continued to rise. The lack of quarters for government employees and the arrival of displaced people intensified the city's housing problem.

The Government of Pakistan started a housing and rehabilitation project in Kushtia in 1958 for refugees and low-income people, with a decision to complete it by 1965. The project planned to construct 726 houses at a cost of 9.7 million taka for refugees and low-income people, along with sanitary latrines, sewerage systems, electricity and all modern amenities.

The Pakistan House Building Finance Corporation established a sub-regional office in Kushtia, which is now known as the Kushtia Zonal Office of the Bangladesh House Building Finance Corporation.

==== Bangladesh Liberation War and mass grave ====
Over time, the area became predominantly inhabited by Bihari Muhajirs. During the Bangladesh Liberation War in 1971, the canal, septic tanks and various other places, including a building in the southeastern part of the area, were used to kill Bengalis and bury their bodies.

=== Post-independence period ===
Until 1982, Housing Estate was part of Majampur Union. On 19 September 1982, a gazette was published expanding the area of Kushtia Municipality, and according to the gazette, Housing Estate was incorporated into the Kushtia Municipality. According to the 1991 and 2001 Bangladeshithree blocks here: Block-A, Block-B and Block-C, respectively. According to the 2011 Bangladeshi census, there were four blocks here: Block-A, Block-B, Block-C and Block-D. According to the 2022 Bangladeshi census, there are six blocks here: Block-A, Block-B, Block-C, Block-D, Block-E and Block-F.

From 2001 to the present, the National Housing Authority has completed two residential plot development projects (3rd and 4th phases). A total of 1,058 and 280 plots were prepared in the 3rd and 4th phases, respectively. In addition, 181 plots are planned to be prepared under a future project of the National Housing Authority (5th phase).

In 2024, following the July Uprising, people selected for plots in the estate held a human chain in front of the Kushtia Zonal Office, stating that they had still not received possession even seven years after paying the price.

== Gallery ==
Housing Central Cemetery

Housing Estate Eidgah

View of the Housing area from Kushtia Medical College

A drainage canal and park

Housing water treatment plant

Housing C Block playground and girls' school

Housing 33/11 kV WZPDCL substation
