= Narsingdi District Jail =

Prison in Bangladesh

Coordinates: 23.9342°N 90.7080°E

Narsindi District Jail, also known as Narsingdi Jail, is the central jail for Narsingdi District located near the Dhaka-Sylhet highway.

== History ==
Narsingdi Jail was established in 1983 as a sub-divisional jail. It had a slogan called Rakhibo Nirapod, Dekhabo Alor Poth. It was upgraded in 1998 to a district jail. In 2019, the Executive Committee of the National Economic Council approved a 3.27 billion BDT project, to be implemented by the Public Works Department, to build new Narsingdi District Jail.

=== 2024 prison break ===
On 19 July 2024, the Jail was attacked by hundreds of people and burned down during the 2024 Bangladesh quota reform movement. During the chaos, the total prison population of 826 escaped, including members of Ansarullah Bangla Team and Jamaat-ul-Mujahideen Bangladesh. Narsingdi District Jail was the first jail to be attacked during the movement. During the attack, 85 firearms and about 9,000 bullets were stolen from the jail. Some guards escaped from the attack disguised as prisoners. More riots and attacks on other prisons during that time saw 2,232 prisoners escape, but half of them surrendered soon after. 11 cases were filed over the attack on the jail, according to Mohammad Mostafizur Rahman, Narsingdi District Superintendent of Police. Jail Superintendent Abul Kalam Azad reported that the attackers took them hostage and they did not receive support from the district police. Asaduzzaman Khan, Minister of Home Affairs, visited the prison, and some escapees surrendered through the Narsingdi District Bar Association. All 77 prison guards were suspended.

After the fall of the Sheikh Hasina-led Awami League government on 5 August, prison breaks and attacks took place in 17 other prisons across Bangladesh. All prisoners in Sherpur District Jail and Satkhira District Jail escaped. Jamalpur District Jail was heavily damaged in the attack, but no one managed to escape. 105 prisoners escaped from Kushtia District Jail and 200 from Kashimpur Central Jail. By February 2025, only 184 escapees from Narsindi District Jail remained on the run after extensive operations to catch the escapees.
