= Bangladesh House Building Finance Corporation =

Public financial institution in Bangladesh

- বাংলাদেশ হাউজ বিল্ডিং ফাইনান্স কর্পোরেশন
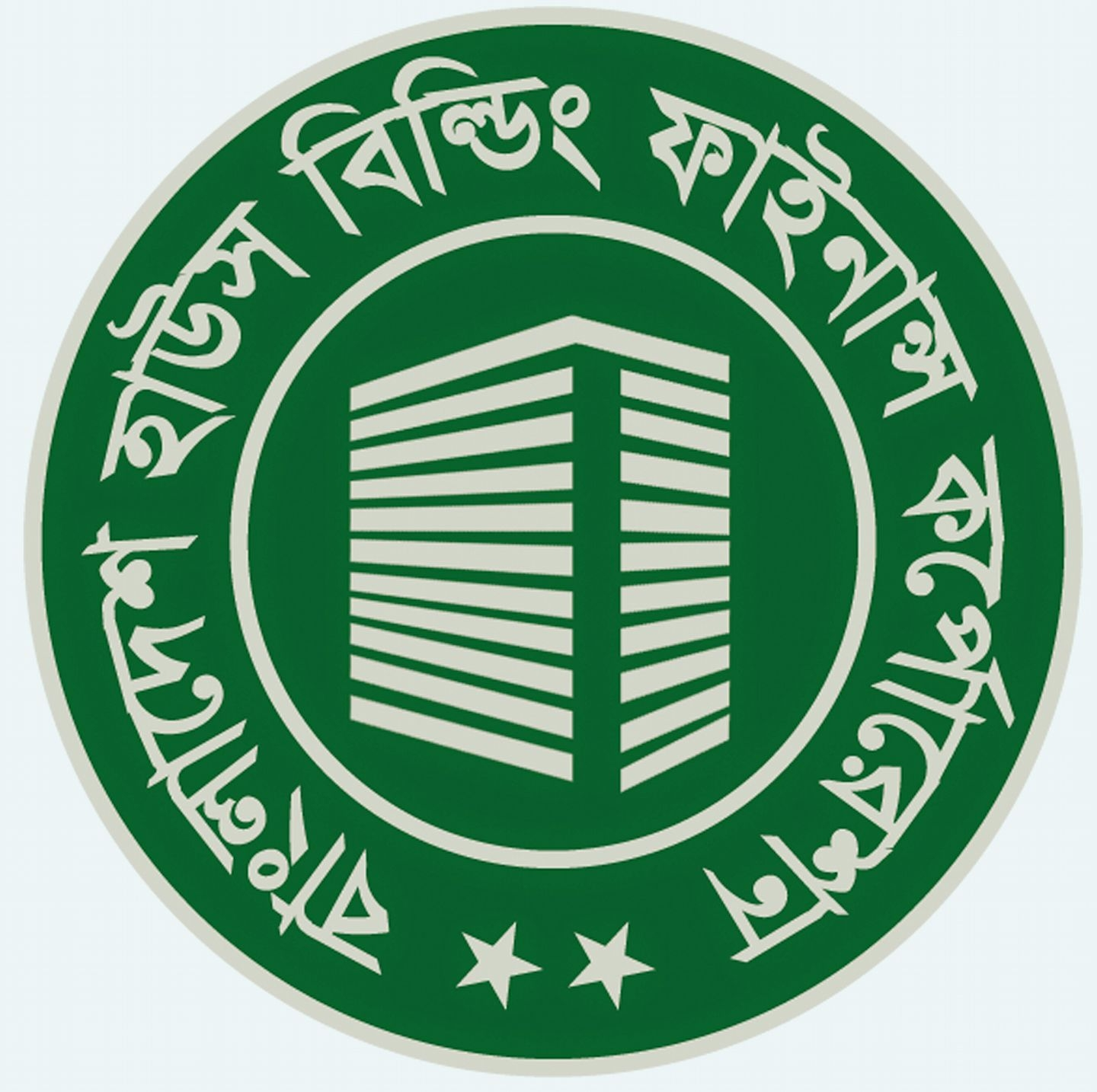

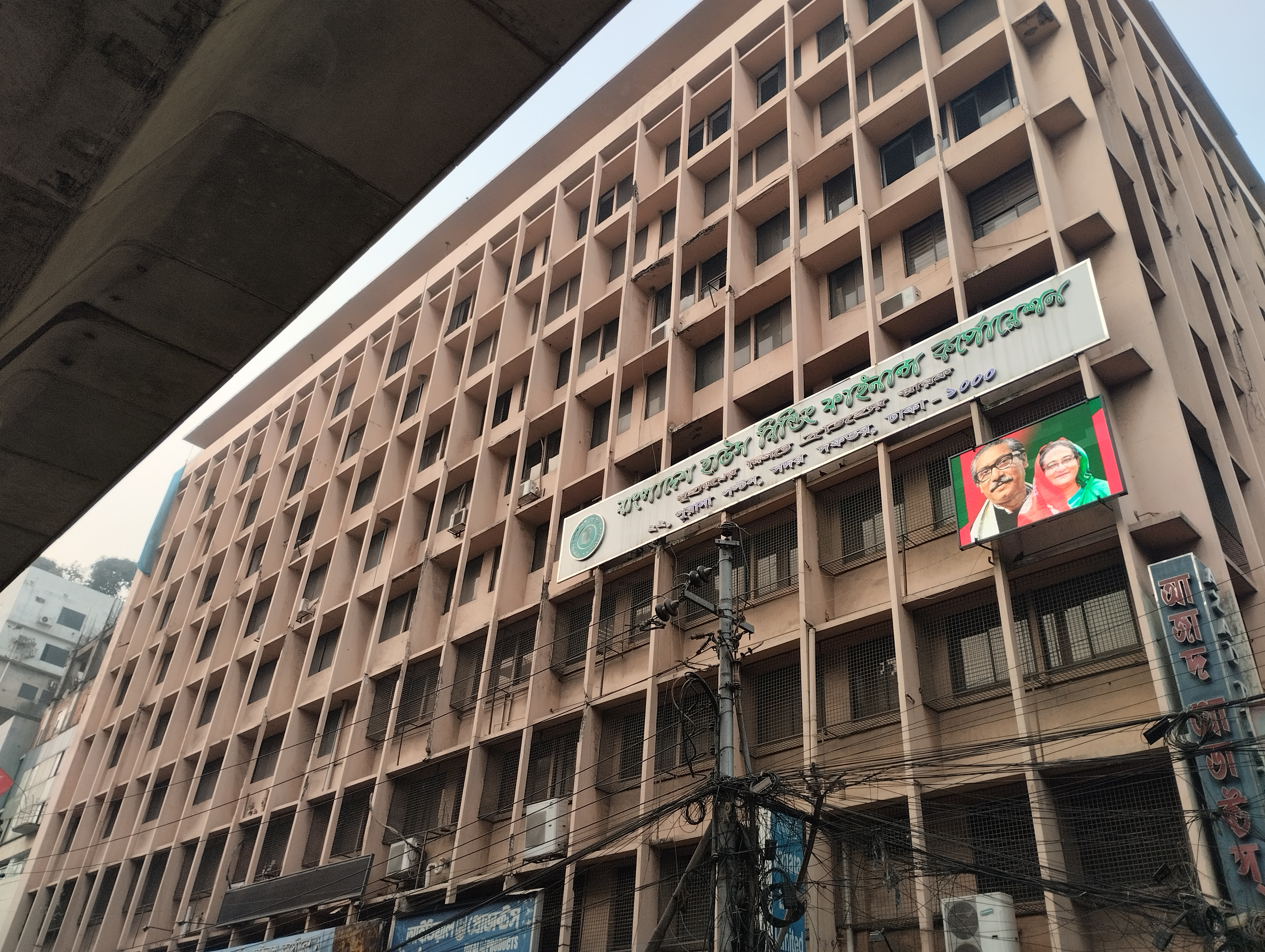
- Headquarters
- Formation: 1952 (in Pakistan period) Re formed in 1973
- Headquarters: 22 Purana Paltan, Dhaka, Bangladesh
- Region served: Bangladesh
- Official language: Bengali
- Website: www.bhbfc.gov.bd

Bangladesh House Building Finance Corporation (BHBFC) is a specialized public financial institution that finances the construction and renovation of houses and the purchase of residential apartments.

== History ==
The institution was established in 1973 under presidential orders. It gives loans for only individual home construction and has faced criticism for giving loans mostly to government employees. It is headquartered in a 10-storey building in Paltan, Dhaka. In 2013, Hefazat-e-Islam Bangladesh tried to burn down the institution's headquarters and vandalized 12 cars.

== Managing director ==
Md. Abdul Mannan is the current managing director of the Bangladesh House Building Finance Corporation. The managing director serves as the chief executive and, on behalf of the board, directs and controls the affairs of the corporation.
