= Muradpur Flyover =

Akhtaruzzaman flyover
- Locale: Chittagong
- Official name: Akhtaruzzaman flyover

Characteristics
- Total length: 6.5 km

History
- Constructed by: Chittagong Development Authority (CDA)
- Construction start: 2014
- Construction end: 17 June 2017
- Construction cost: approx. 696 cr.৳

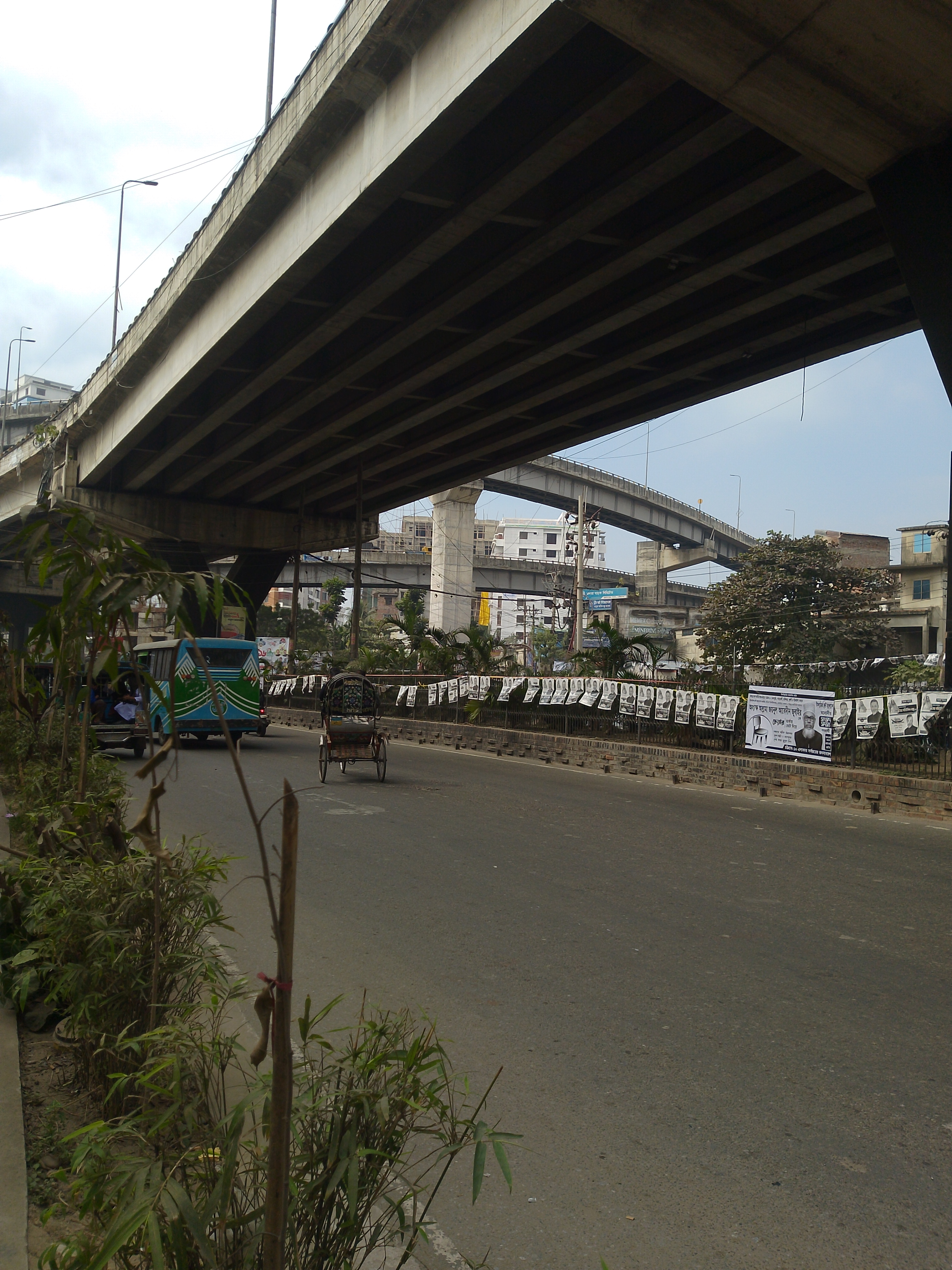

The Akhtaruzzaman flyover is the largest highway overpass in Chittagong, Bangladesh. Its foundation stone was laid in 2013 by Prime Minister Sheikh Hasina; construction officially began in 2014.

The flyover was partially opened on 17 June 2017, and became fully accessible soon after. Since its opening, the flyover has seen three auto accidents, which claimed the lives of four people.
