= Farmgate metro station =

Metro station in Dhaka

Farmgate ফার্মগেট
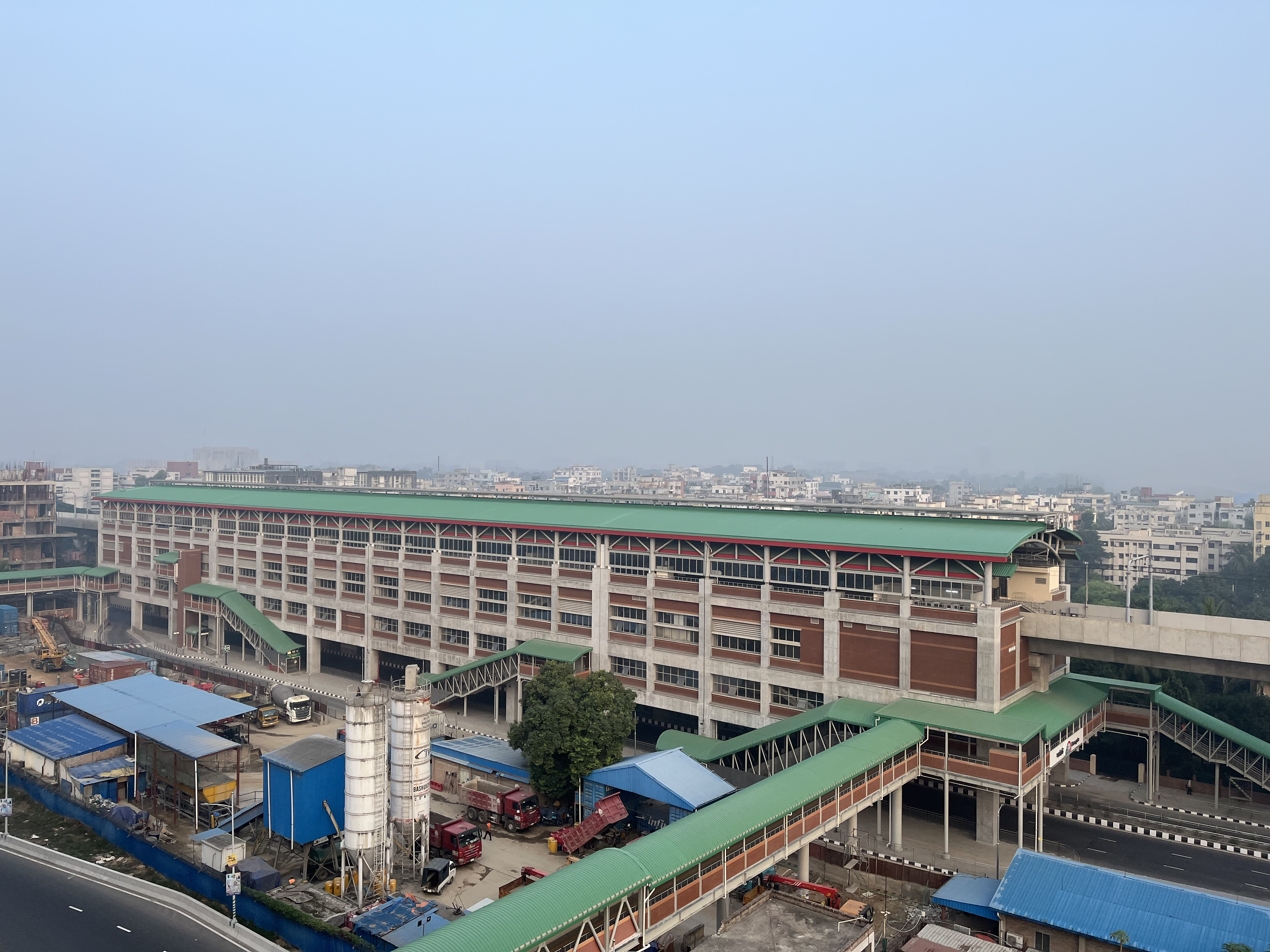
- Station building

General information
- Other names: Station 11
- Location: Farmhouse Road, Farmgate, Dhaka; Bangladesh
- Coordinates: 23.7602°N 90.3865°E
- System: Dhaka Metro Rail station
- Owner: Dhaka Mass Transit Company Limited
- Line: MRT Line 6
- Platforms: Side platform
- Tracks: 2
- Connections: Bus stand

Construction
- Structure type: Elevated
- Platform levels: 4
- Parking: No
- Cycle facilities: No
- Accessible: Yes

History
- Opened: 5 November 2023
- Electrified: 1,500 V DC overhead catenary

Services
Preceding station	Dhaka Metro	Following station
Bijoy Sarani towards Uttara North	MRT Line 6	Kawran Bazar towards Kamalapur
Route map
- Source
Location

Farmgate (Bengali: ফার্মগেট, romanised: Farmget) is an elevated metro station of the Dhaka Metro's MRT Line 6. This station is located in the neighbourhood of Farmgate. The station commenced operations on 5 November 2023.
