= Office of the Spokesperson for the Secretary-General =

Department of the United Nations

The Office of the Spokesperson for the Secretary-General is a department of the United Nations that provides information to the news media regarding the activities of the U.N. as a whole.

== Role ==
The department is in charge of managing media relations on behalf of:

- The Secretary-General of the United Nations
- The Deputy Secretary-General of the United Nations
- Other senior U.N. officials

== Officers ==
- Stéphane Dujarric – Spokesperson for the Secretary-General
- Farhan Haq – Deputy Spokesperson
- Daniela Gross De Almeida – Associate Spokesperson
- Shirin Yaseen – Associate Spokesperson
- Inazio Lopez Ochoa – Associate Spokesperson
- Nadia Al Kabariti – Associate Expert

== Controversy ==
In 2012, the official United Nations Twitter account posted an erroneous tweet, implying that the U.N. Secretary-General supports a one-state solution to the Israeli–Palestinian conflict. The tweet was later found to have been written by spokesperson Nancy Groves, who attributed it to a "terrible typo".

According to Reuters, the U.N. spokesperson post is considered to be a "dream job", but it requires taking into account the concerns of the 192 nations and "competing for the Secretary-General's attention".
