= Kushtia District Jail =

Prison in Bangladesh

- Interactive map of Kushtia District Jail
- Location: Kushtia, Bangladesh; 23.8960°N 89.1266°E
- Opened: 1968; 58 years ago
- Managed by: Bangladesh Jail
- Warden: 210
- Website: prison.kushtia.gov.bd

Kushtia District Jail (Bengali: কুষ্টিয়া জেলা কারাগার) is a district jail in Kushtia District, Bangladesh. The jail was established in 1968 in Kushtia and currently managed by Bangladesh Jail.

== Organizational structure ==
There are 03 divisions under 01 Jail Superintendent.

- General Section
  - Jail Super 01 person
  - Deputy district 02 people
  - Sergeant Instructor 01
  - Chief prison guard 02 people
  - 10 chief jailers
  - The number of prison guard posts is 176
  - Kara assistant cum-computer 02 people
  - 15 assistant chief jailers
  - Matron 01 person
  - Assistant Matron 02
  - 02 assistant surgeons
  - 1 teacher
  - 01 cook
  - 5 cleaning staff
- Medical Department
  - 01 assistant surgeon
  - Diploma Nurse 01
  - 02 pharmacists
  - 01 driver
- Production department
  - Accountant 01 person
  - Taylor 01

== Prisoner escape ==
On August 7, 2024, at 2:30 PM, some prisoners broke through the main gate of the prison and escaped. According to various media reports, 40-50 prisoners escaped. But the District Commissioner said 12-13 accused escaped.

25-30 prison guards were injured in this attack by miscreants. 50-60 men led by the miscreant chief attacked the prison guards. Prison guards fired rubber bullets to bring the situation under control. Such attacks are carried out by miscreants during the change of duty of prison guards.
