= Jatiya Nari Shakti =

Political organization in Bangladesh

- জাতীয় নারী শক্তি
- Abbreviation: JNS
- Nickname: Nari Shakti
- Formation: 8 March 2026 (7 months ago)
- Type: Political organization; Women's wing
- Legal status: Active
- Purpose: To address women's rights and enhance political participation
- Headquarters: Rupayan Trade Centre, 114 Kazi Nazrul Islam Avenue, Banglamotor, Dhaka, Bangladesh
- Region served: Bangladesh
- Official language: Bengali
- Convener: Dr. Mahmuda Alam Mitu Mp
- Member Secretary: Nusrat Tabassum Mp
- Chief Organizer: Advocate Monjila Zhuma
- Main organ: Central Convening Committee
- Parent organization: National Citizen Party

Jatiya Nari Shakti (Bengali: জাতীয় নারী শক্তি, lit. 'National Women's Power') is a Bangladeshi political organization serving as the women's wing of the National Citizen Party (NCP). It was formally launched on 8 March 2026, with the aim of addressing women's rights and enhancing political participation in Bangladesh. NCP leader Monira Sharmin serves as the founding convener of the organization.

== History ==
=== Formation ===
Jatiya Nari Shakti was launched on 8 March 2026 at the Sagar–Runi Auditorium of the Dhaka Reporters Unity in Dhaka. NCP convener and Opposition Chief Whip Nahid Islam announced the formation of the women's wing and named Monira Sharmin as convener, Mahmuda Alam Mitu as member secretary, and Nusrat Tabassum as chief organizer. All three leaders were active participants in the July Uprising of 2024 and serve in leadership positions within the NCP's central committee.

The NCP had not initially planned to establish a separate women's wing. Islam stated that the party originally intended to address women's issues within its main structures. However, the leadership later concluded that a dedicated body was necessary to focus specifically on the rights and political participation of women in Bangladesh.

We will try to find those women across the country whose voices were lost in July. Jatiya Nari Shakti will bring them forward once again.

— Nahid Islam

Speaking at the launch event, Islam emphasized that Jatiya Nari Shakti would take a strong stance in support of women's rights in Bangladesh, particularly against violence against women and cyberbullying. He noted that many women could not participate in the front lines of the July uprising due to the absence of a women-friendly environment, adding that although affiliated with the NCP, Jatiya Nari Shakti will operate with a degree of independence.

=== Panel discussion ===
The launch event featured a panel discussion with prominent figures including former interim government adviser Farida Akhter, leader of the Bangladesh Jamaat-e-Islami's women's wing Sabikun Nahar Munni, The Daily Star journalist Zyma Islam, Dhaka University Central Students' Union (DUCSU) leader Fatima Tasnim Juma, and North South University student and women's rights activist Nafsin Mehnaz Azirin. The session was moderated by Nusrat Tabassum, chief organizer of Jatiya Nari Shakti. Farida Akhter addressed the event, stating that the platform would help strengthen women's political participation and urged merit-based nominations to reserved seats for women in parliament.

=== Central Committee formation ===
On 18 April 2026, the NCP announced a full 53-member central convening committee for Jatiya Nari Shakti, approved under the direction of NCP convener Nahid Islam and member secretary Akhter Hossen. The announcement confirmed Monira Sharmin as convener, Mahmuda Alam Mitu as member secretary, and Nusrat Tabassum as chief organizer. Sanzida Bushra Mishma was appointed the senior joint convener. The joint conveners included Hafsa Jahan, Nabila Tasnid, Khandakar Khaleda Akter, Ashrefa Khatun, and Muna Hafsa. Manjila Jhuma was appointed the senior joint member secretary.

== Organization ==
=== Structure ===
The Central Convening Committee serves as the main organ of the organization, consisting of 53 members appointed to oversee the activities and direction of Jatiya Nari Shakti across Bangladesh.

=== Leadership ===
Position	Name
Convener	Mahmuda Alam Mitu
Member Secretary	Nusrat Tabassum
Chief Organizer	Manjila Jhuma
Senior Joint Convener	Sanzida Bushra Mishma
Joint Conveners	Muna Hafsa; Hafsa Jahan; Nabila Tasnid; Khandakar Khaleda Akter; Ashrefa Khatun
Senior Joint Member Secretary

=== Key figures ===
- Mahmuda Alam Mitu – Member Secretary of Jatiya Nari Shakti and joint member secretary of the NCP central committee. A physician by profession, she participated actively in the July uprising.
- Nusrat Tabassum – Chief Organizer of Jatiya Nari Shakti and joint convener of the NCP central committee. She was among the frontline coordinators of the anti-discrimination student movement at Dhaka University.

== Activities ==
=== Political participation ===
Jatiya Nari Shakti focuses on enhancing the political participation of women in Bangladesh, particularly those who were marginalized or silenced during and after the July 2024 uprising. The organization works to provide a platform for women's voices within the broader political framework of the National Citizen Party.

=== Reserved seats nominations ===
In April 2026, ahead of the 12 May election for reserved women's seats in the 13th Jatiya Sangsad, both Monira Sharmin and Mahmuda Alam Mitu were nominated by the Jamaat-e-Islami-led 11-party alliance for parliamentary seats.

== See also ==
- National Citizen Party
- Jatiya Chhatra Shakti
- Bangladesh Jatiotabadi Mohila Dal
- Women in Bangladesh
- July Uprising
