= Nusrat Tabassum =

Bangladeshi politician and activist

- নুসরাত তাবাসসুম
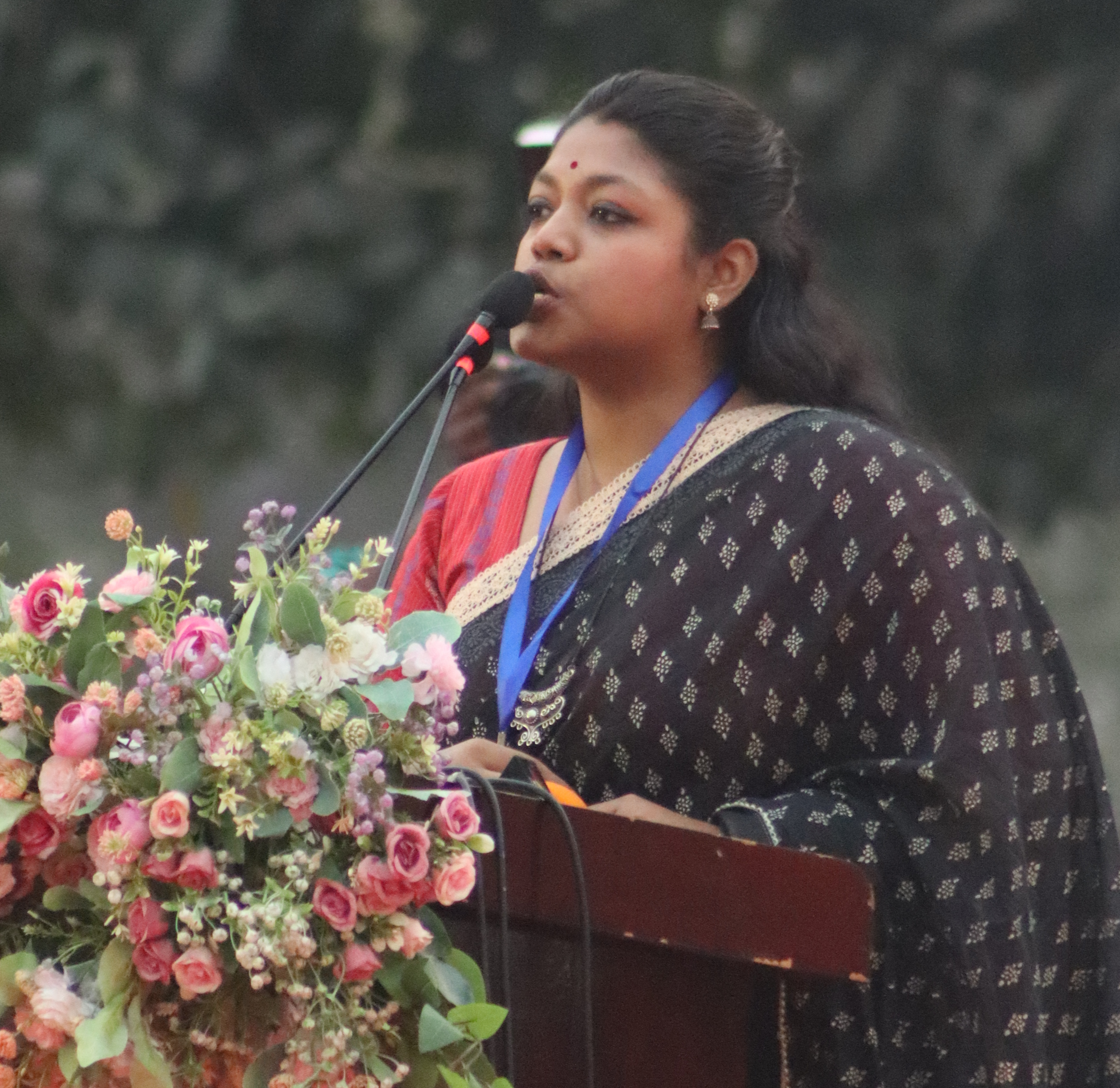
- Tabassum in 2025

Member of Parliament
- Incumbent
- Assumed office 6 May 2026
- Preceded by: Waseqa Ayesha Khan
- Constituency: Reserved Seat-47

Chief Organizer of the Jatiya Nari Shakti
- Incumbent
- Assumed office 8 March 2026
- Convener: Monira Sharmin
- Member Secretary: Mahmuda Mitu
- Preceded by: position established

Personal details
- Born: 18 March 2001 (age 25) Bagoan, Daulatpur, Kushtia District, Bangladesh
- Party: National Citizen Party
- Education: University of Dhaka (MA)
- Occupation: Activist
- Known for: July Uprising
- Organization: Bangladesh Chhatra Odhikar Parishad (2021–2023); Gonotantrik Chhatra Shakti (2023–2024); Jatiya Nari Shakti (2026–present)
- Nickname: Jyoti

Nusrat Tabassum (Bengali: নুসরাত তাবাসসুম; born March 18, 2001) is a Bangladeshi politician and human rights activist who is a Member of Parliament representing the reserved women's seat for National Citizen Party (NCP). She is also a joint convener of the NCP and chief organizer of the Jatiya Nari Shakti.

A student of political science at Dhaka University, Tabassum gained national prominence as one of the six key coordinators of the Students Against Discrimination during the July Uprising, which led to the resignation of Sheikh Hasina and the fall of the Awami League government. She was among the frontline leaders who mobilized students, particularly women, during the uprising. She was detained by the Detective Branch (DB) of police on 28 July 2024, becoming the only female coordinator taken into custody among the six detained leaders. After being coerced to call off protests while in detention, she was released on 1 August and immediately rejoined the protests.

== Early life and education ==
Tabassum was born around 2001 in Bagoan village, Mathurapur Union, Daulatpur Upazila in Kushtia District, Bangladesh. Both of her parents are teachers, with her father working as a school teacher. She grew up in a politically diverse household, with her extended family involved in politics across the ideological spectrum from far-left to far-right.

She completed her primary education at Bagoan Government Primary School and secondary education at Bagoan K.C.V.N. Secondary School. She then attended Dr. Fazlul Haque Girls' Degree College for her higher secondary education. During her school years, she was actively involved in debate, crafts, recitation, and theater.

In July 2018, Tabassum came to Dhaka to attend university entrance coaching classes in Farmgate. This period coincided with the 2018 Bangladesh quota reform movement, which deeply inspired her political consciousness. She was admitted to the University of Dhaka later that year, enrolling in the Department of Political Science (2018–19 session). She resided at Shamsunnahar Hall during her time at the university.

== Early political activism ==
Tabassum's first direct involvement in activism came during the 2018 road safety movement, which she described as the "defining moment of political consciousness for Gen-Zs of Bangladesh." As a college student, she participated in protests in Jigatola, where she witnessed brutal attacks on protesters by Bangladesh Chhatra League (BCL) activists and law enforcement.

After entering the university, she became involved in campus movements, including protests against the affiliation of seven colleges with the university. She was also among the primary organizers of protests following the murder of Abrar Fahad at Bangladesh University of Engineering and Technology (BUET) in 2019. In March 2021, she joined protests against "Indian aggression".

Throughout her student life at Dhaka University, she remained vocal against Chhatra League. She was subjected to torture by BCL activists at Shamsunnahar Hall.

=== Affiliations with Bangladesh Chhatra Odhikar Parishad and Gonotantrik Chhatra Shakti ===
On 17 March 2021, Tabassum was elected as cultural secretary of the Dhaka University chapter of the Bangladesh Chhatra Odhikar Parishad. She later served as joint secretary of the Dhaka University chapter for six months. In 2023, she ran for the position of general secretary but lost by a narrow margin, becoming assistant general secretary instead.

However, she became disillusioned with the organization's direction, believing that leader Nurul Haque Nur was deviating from the original goal of student welfare on campuses. Along with Asif Mahmud, and the entire Dhaka University chapter, she resigned from the Chhatra Odhikar Parishad in 2023.

After resignation, Tabassum joined Gonotantrik Chhatra Shakti as one of its founding joint organizing secretaries. The organization was formed on 4 October 2023 under the leadership of Akhter Hossen, with Nahid Islam as member secretary. Chhatra Shakti became the organizational backbone for many of the leaders who would later coordinate the July Uprising.

== July Uprising ==
=== Coordination and leadership ===
Tabassum joined the Students Against Discrimination on 6 June 2024, in front of the Dhaka University Central Library, marking the beginning of her direct involvement in what would become the July Uprising. As the quota reform movement intensified, she emerged as one of the key coordinators at the university and was among the frontline coordinators of the organization.

On 8 July 2024, when the movement expanded its leadership team to 65 members (comprising 23 coordinators and 42 co-coordinators), Tabassum was included as one of the influential coordinators from Chhatra Shakti. She played a crucial role as coordinator of the women's movement throughout the uprising.

=== Women's mobilization ===
Tabassum was instrumental in mobilizing female students during the uprising. On the night of 14 July 2024, after Sheikh Hasina labeled protesters as "Razakars", she coordinated with fellow activist Ashrefa to bring out female students from Shamsunnahar Hall. In less than 15 minutes, students from nearly all women's dormitories agreed to join the protest.

Approximately 500 female students from Shamsunnahar, Rokeya, and Sufia Kamal Halls gathered at Raju Memorial Sculpture for a sit-in protest, demonstrating unprecedented female participation in Bangladeshi student movements.

=== Detention and torture ===
On 28 July 2024, Tabassum was picked up from her cousin's house in Rupnagar, Mirpur, at around 5:00 AM (BST) by 10–15 plainclothes armed men claiming to be from the Detective Branch (DB) of police. She became the only female coordinator among six key movement leaders — including Nahid Islam, Asif Mahmud, Sarjis Alam, Hasnat Abdullah, and Abu Bakar Majumder — to be detained.

While in DB custody, Tabassum endured severe psychological torture. She was kept in solitary confinement in a place with no windows and no sense of time, with artificial lights constantly on. She described the experience as reminiscent of the Aynaghar detention facility where many people were allegedly held for years.

On 28 July at around 8:00 PM (BST), the six detained coordinators were coerced into recording a video message from the DB office announcing the withdrawal of all protest programs. However, other coordinators who remained free — including Abdul Kader, Abdul Hannan Masud, and Mahin Sarkar — immediately rejected the announcement, stating the detained leaders were held hostage and forced to make the statement under duress.

On 30 July, Tabassum joined fellow detainees in beginning a hunger strike at the DB office to protest the unjust arrests and alleged torture of students nationwide. The hunger strike was kept secret from families and media for over 32 hours until the DB chief decided to release the six coordinators.

=== Release and return to movement ===
Tabassum was released on 1 August 2024. She required 48 hours to recover physically and was mentally energized to continue the movement. She rejoined protests immediately, playing a key role in the final days leading to Hasina's resignation on 5 August 2024.

== Political career ==
=== National Citizen Party ===
Following the success of the July Uprising and the formation of the Jatiya Nagorik Committee in September 2024, Tabassum became involved in the process of establishing a new political party. When the National Citizen Party (NCP) was officially launched on 28 February 2025, she was appointed as one of the joint conveners of the party's central committee, serving alongside Monira Sharmin and Samanta Sharmin.

As a joint convener, Tabassum emphasized the importance of equal representation, stating that women's leadership should not be viewed separately and that the July Uprising demonstrated how women can step forward and take charge in times of need.

=== Jatiya Nari Shakti ===
On 8 March 2026, coinciding with International Women's Day, the NCP launched its women's wing, Jatiya Nari Shakti. Tabassum was appointed as the chief organizer of the organization, working alongside convener Monira Sharmin and member secretary Mahmuda Mitu. All three leaders had been active participants in the July Uprising.

On 18 April 2026, a full 53-member central convening committee was announced for Jatiya Nari Shakti, confirming Tabassum's position as chief organizer.

=== Member of Parliament ===
In April 2026, ahead of the election for reserved women's seats in the 13th Jatiya Sangsad, Tabassum was nominated by the Bangladesh Jamaat-e-Islami-led 11 Party Alliance, of which the NCP was a member.

On 21 April 2026, the deadline for submitting nomination papers, Tabassum submitted her nomination at 4:19 PM—19 minutes after the 4:00 PM deadline. The Election Commission initially rejected her nomination for missing the deadline. However, on 27 April 2026, Tabassum filed a writ petition with the High Court seeking to regain her candidacy. A High Court bench comprising Justice Ahmed Sohel and Justice Fatema Anwar heard her petition and directed the commission to accept her nomination papers and proceed in accordance with the law.

On 2 May 2026, the nomination scrutiny was conducted, and Returning Officer Md Moin Uddin Khan declared Tabassum's nomination valid. The Election Commission subsequently confirmed her candidacy for the reserved women's seat election scheduled for 12 May 2026.

== Recognition ==
Front Line Defenders, an international human rights organization, recognized Nusrat Tabassum as a human rights defender and documented her arbitrary detention and torture during the July Uprising. The organization condemned the arbitrary detention and harassment of Tabassum and five other student coordinators, calling it retaliation for their legitimate human rights work.

International media, including The Guardian and CNN, highlighted the role of student leaders like her in what they dubbed the world's first successful "Gen Z revolution". The July Uprising was noted for unprecedented female participation in Bangladeshi politics, with Tabassum being specifically recognized as a key female coordinator who inspired women's participation and served as a human shield during attacks.

== Personal life ==
Tabassum is known by the nickname "Jyoti." She maintains a residence in Dhaka while her family home remains in Bagoan village, Daulatpur, Kushtia District.

Her political consciousness was shaped by significant events in Bangladesh's recent history, including the 2009 BDR Mutiny, the 2013 Shahbag protests, and the 2013 Shapla Square counterprotests by the Hefazat-e-Islam.

== See also ==
- Women in Bangladesh
