= Banani Bidyaniketan School and College =

- বনানী বিদ্যানিকেতন স্কুল অ্যান্ড কলেজ
- Logo of Banani Bidyaniketan School and College

Location
- Road 23/A, Banani; Dhaka, 1213; Bangladesh
- Coordinates: 23.7959°N 90.4032°E

Information
- Type: school and college
- Established: 1972
- Founder: Ayesha Amin
- School board: Board of Intermediate and Secondary Education, Dhaka
- Principal: Mashiur Rahman
- Staff: 50
- Faculty: 200+
- Language: Bangla
- Website: www.bbnsc.edu.bd

Banani Bidyaniketan School and College is an educational institution in Banani, Dhaka, Bangladesh.

== History ==
Banani Bidyaniketan School and College was established in 1972 with just 197 students in presence of former Education Minister Muhammad Yusuf Ali, former chairman of Dhaka Improvement Trust (DIT) who donated 7.5 Bigha land, members of "Banani Nabarun Society", Member of Parliament & MCA Syed Qumrul Islam Saleh Uddin (Faridpur-3). Banani Bidyaniketan started its journey on 31 January 1972 in an abandoned house of a gentleman named Osman, who was a Pakistani citizen. Asesha Amin (Lily) was the founder and Principal of this school. Later on, the school moved to its permanent campus. Banani Bidyaniketan was named "The Best Institute in Dhaka City Corporation" in the year 2001.

== Notable alumni ==
- Mamun Al Mahtab (Shwapnil), a Bangladeshi hepatologist
- Md Moshfequr Rahman, a Bangladeshi Major General
- Golam Nafiz, a Bangladeshi student activist who died in 2024 Non-cooperation movement

== See also ==
- List of universities in Bangladesh
- List of Islamic educational institutions
