= Mahmuda Mitu =

Bangladeshi politician

- মাহমুদা মিতু

Member of Parliament
- Incumbent
- Assumed office 3 May 2026
- Preceded by: Dilwara Yousuf
- Constituency: Reserved Seat-46

Member Secretary of the Jatiya Nari Shakti
- Incumbent
- Assumed office 8 March 2026
- Convener: Monira Sharmin
- Preceded by: Organisation established

Deputy Chief Organizer (Southern Region) of the National Citizen Party
- Incumbent
- Assumed office March 2025
- Convener: Nahid Islam
- Chief Organizer: Hasnat Abdullah

Personal details
- Born: 10 February 1989 (age 37) Betagi, Barguna, Bangladesh
- Party: National Citizen Party
- Education: Shahabuddin Medical College
- Occupation: Politician, physician

Mahmuda Alam Mitu (Bengali: মাহমুদা আলম মিতু) is a Bangladeshi politician and physician who serves as deputy chief organizer (southern region) of the National Citizen Party (NCP) and member secretary of its women's wing, Jatiya Nari Shakti. In April 2026, she was nominated by the 11 Party Alliance for a reserved women's seat in the Jatiya Sangsad.

== Early life and education ==
Mitu was born in Betagi, Barguna District. Her father is Mahbub Alam and her mother is Yasmin Alam. She is the eldest among two siblings. She completed her Secondary School Certificate (SSC) from Betagi Girls' High School and Higher Secondary School Certificate (HSC) from Betagi Government Degree College. She later obtained her MBBS degree from Shahabuddin Medical College in Gulshan, Dhaka.

== Role in the July Uprising ==
During the July Uprising, Mitu supported participants through social media and medical networks by providing medical advice and first aid. She later described witnessing a violent incident during the uprising, stating that a protester near her was shot during enforcement of Section 144, which had a lasting psychological impact on her. For her contribution, she received the "July Kanya Award".

== Political career ==
A medical doctor by profession, Mitu has been actively involved in politics. She currently serves as a joint central member secretary of the National Citizen Party.

She submitted her nomination to contest the 2026 general election from the Jhalokati-1 constituency as a candidate of the NCP, but later withdrew her candidacy. Following her nomination, she alleged that she received death threats from unknown callers in December 2025. She shared details of the threats on her verified Facebook account.

=== Death threats ===
In November 2026, Mahmuda Mitu received death threats via phone calls and WhatsApp messages. On 13 November, she shared screenshots of the threatening messages, including one sent from an Indian number under the name of Lawrence Bishnoi. On 15 November, while she was at the National Parliament Of Bangladesh, she received a phone call in which the caller warned her to leave the country and threatened to dismember her.

== See also ==
- Tasnim Jara
