= Killing of Golam Nafiz =

Bangladeshi student activist

Md. Golam Nafiz
- গোলাম নাফিজ
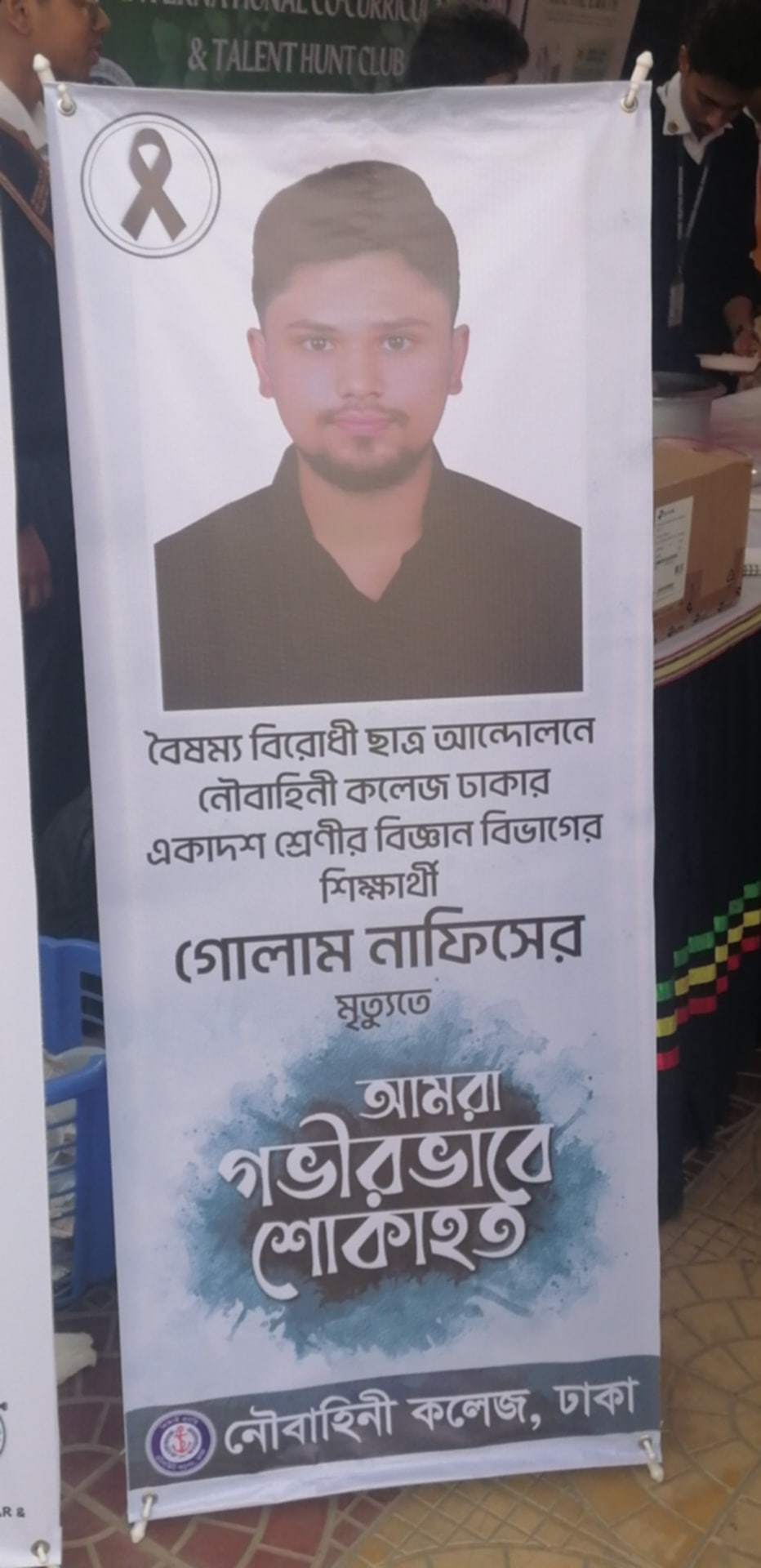
- Nafiz featured in a banner in Noubahini College, Dhaka festival
- Born: 22 May 2008
- Died: 4 August 2024 (aged 16); Farmgate, Dhaka, Bangladesh
- Cause of death: Gunshot wounds
- Education: Banani Bidyaniketan School and College Noubahini College, Dhaka (never attended)
- Occupation: Student
- Known for: Notable member of the July Uprising; martyr of July massacre
- Movement: July Uprising; Non-cooperation movement

Md. Golam Nafiz (Bengali: মো. গোলাম নাফিজ; 22 May 2008 – 4 August 2024), was a Bangladeshi student activist who died in the Non-cooperation movement on 4 August 2024. He was photographed on a rickshaw on the way to the hospital, the image of which was well-publicized among the many fatalities of the July Uprising.

== Personal life ==
Nafiz was born to Md. Golam Rahman and Nazma Akter Nasima. He was the second child of the couple and the youngest of two brothers. His elder brother's name is Md. Golam Rasel. He lived in Mohakhali with his family. He passed his Secondary School Certificate (SSC) examination from Banani Bidyaniketan School and College. He got admission in the Noubahini College, Dhaka in eleventh grade, but never attended for the circumstances of his death.

== Non-cooperation movement and death ==
On the first day of the Non-cooperation movement, Nafiz and his friends joined protests in the Farmgate–Khamarbari area. Around 4.30 p.m., Nafiz was shot by the police at the Farmgate intersection. After being wounded, fellow protesters placed him in a rickshaw in an attempt to transport him to the nearest hospital. According to rickshaw puller Noor Mohammad, Nafiz was unconscious but still alive at that time. However, members of the Chhatra League obstructed the rickshaw, causing a delay in reaching the hospital. Upon arrival, doctors declared Nafiz dead.

On the way to the hospital, photojournalist Jibon Ahmed from Daily Manab Zamin captured a widely circulated image of Nafiz lying in the rickshaw's footwell with a Bangladeshi flag tied around his head, his arms and legs sprawled. The image quickly spread on social media and was featured on the front page of Manab Zamin the following day.

Nafiz's father searched for him throughout the night, going from hospital to hospital. It was only the next day that he found his son's body at the morgue of Shaheed Suhrawardy Medical College and Hospital.

== Legacy ==
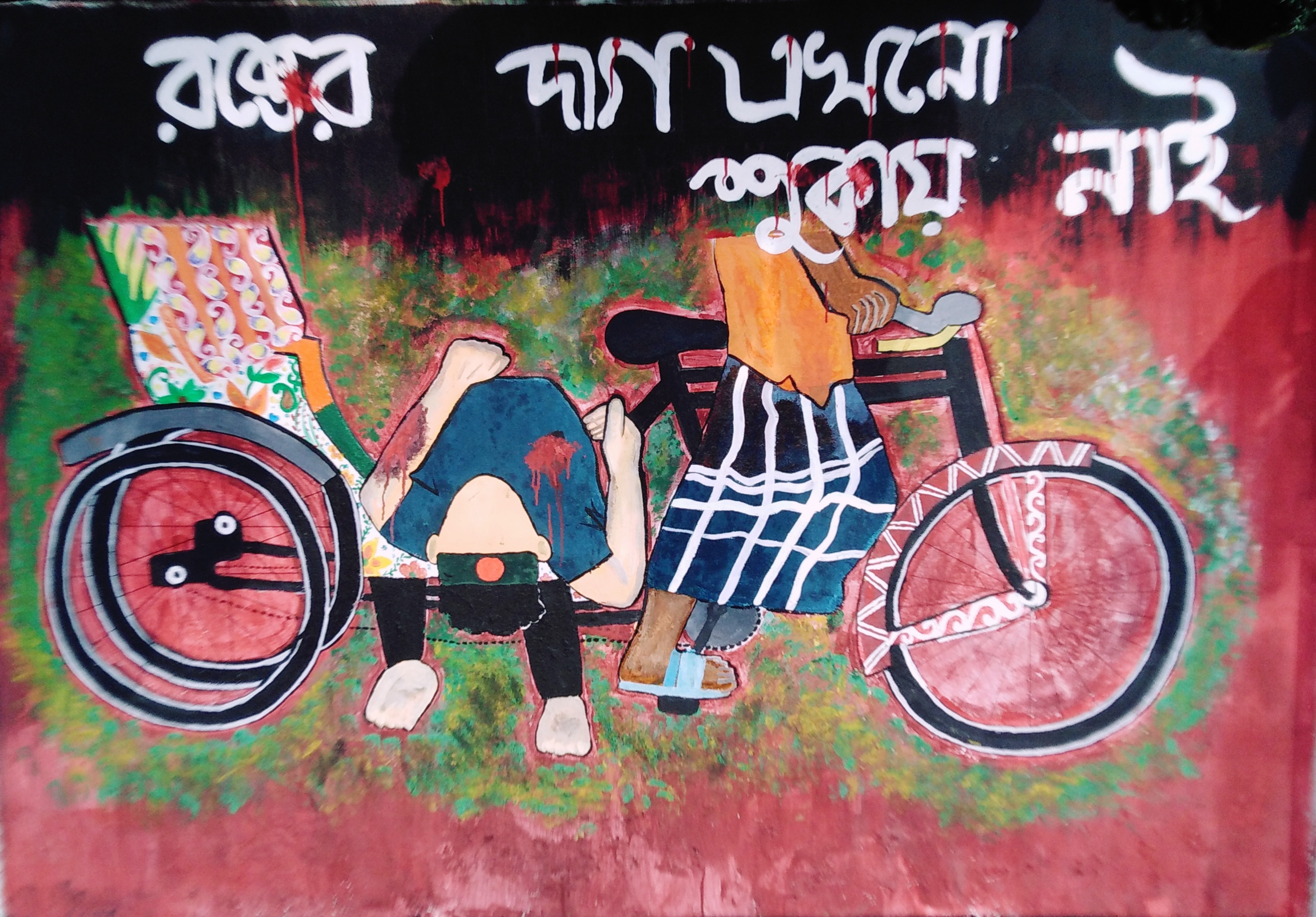
A graffiti of Nafiz being carried on rickshaw with the phrase: রক্তের দাগ এখনো শুকায় নাই (English: "The blood stain has not yet dried")

On 19 August 2024, two advisers of the interim government and principle coordinators of Students Against Discrimination, Nahid Islam and Asif Mahmud, visited Nafiz's home. Banani Bidyaniketan School and College named one of their academic buildings after him. The rickshaw carrying Nafiz was later donated to July Mass Uprising Memorial Museum and the rickshaw puller, Nur Mohammad, was assured of financial assistance by the interim government.

== See also ==
- July massacre
- List of people who died in the July massacre
  - Abu Sayed
  - Mir Mugdho
