= Razakar slogans =

Razakar slogans painted by students after the July Uprising in Dhaka
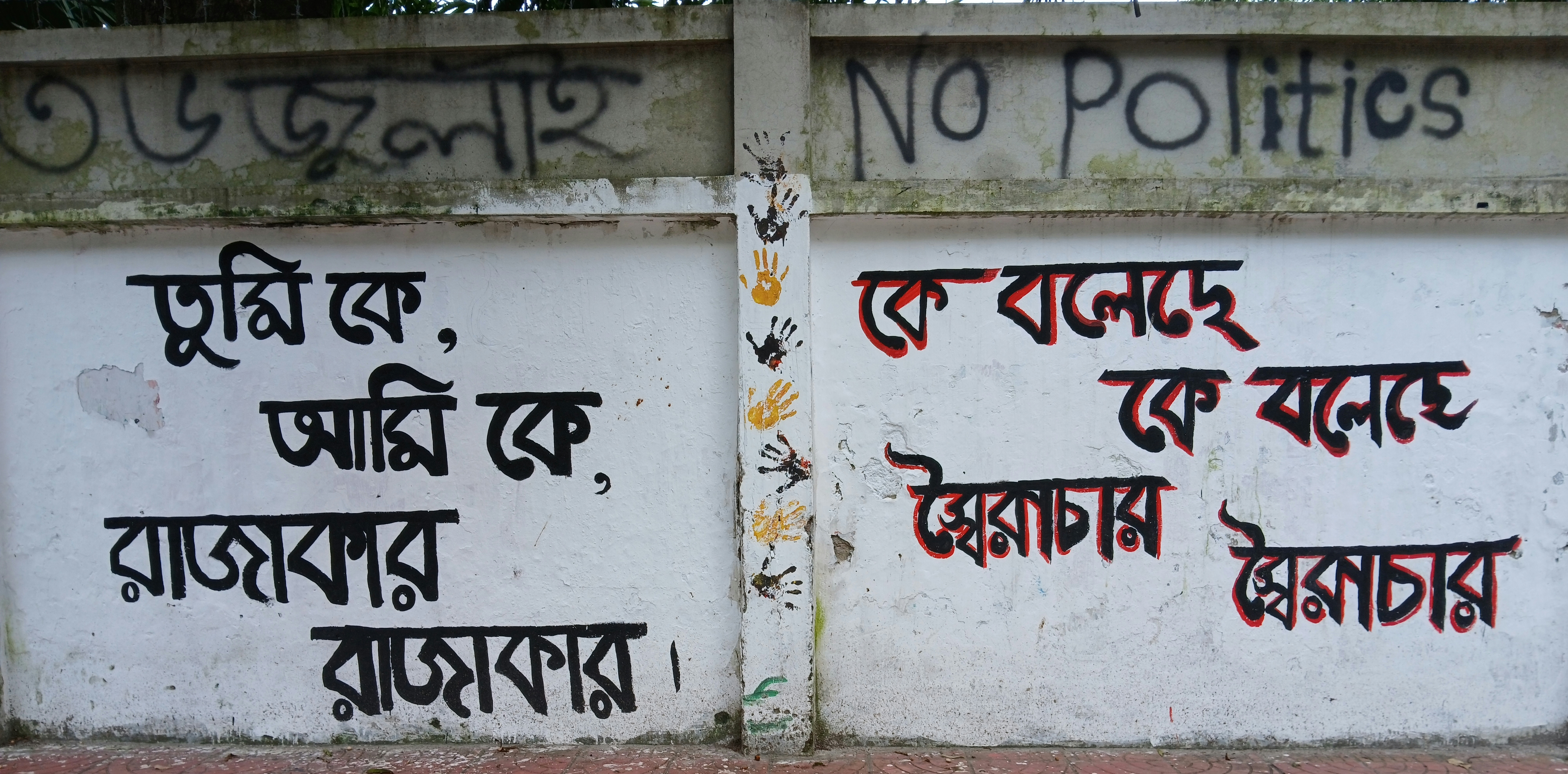
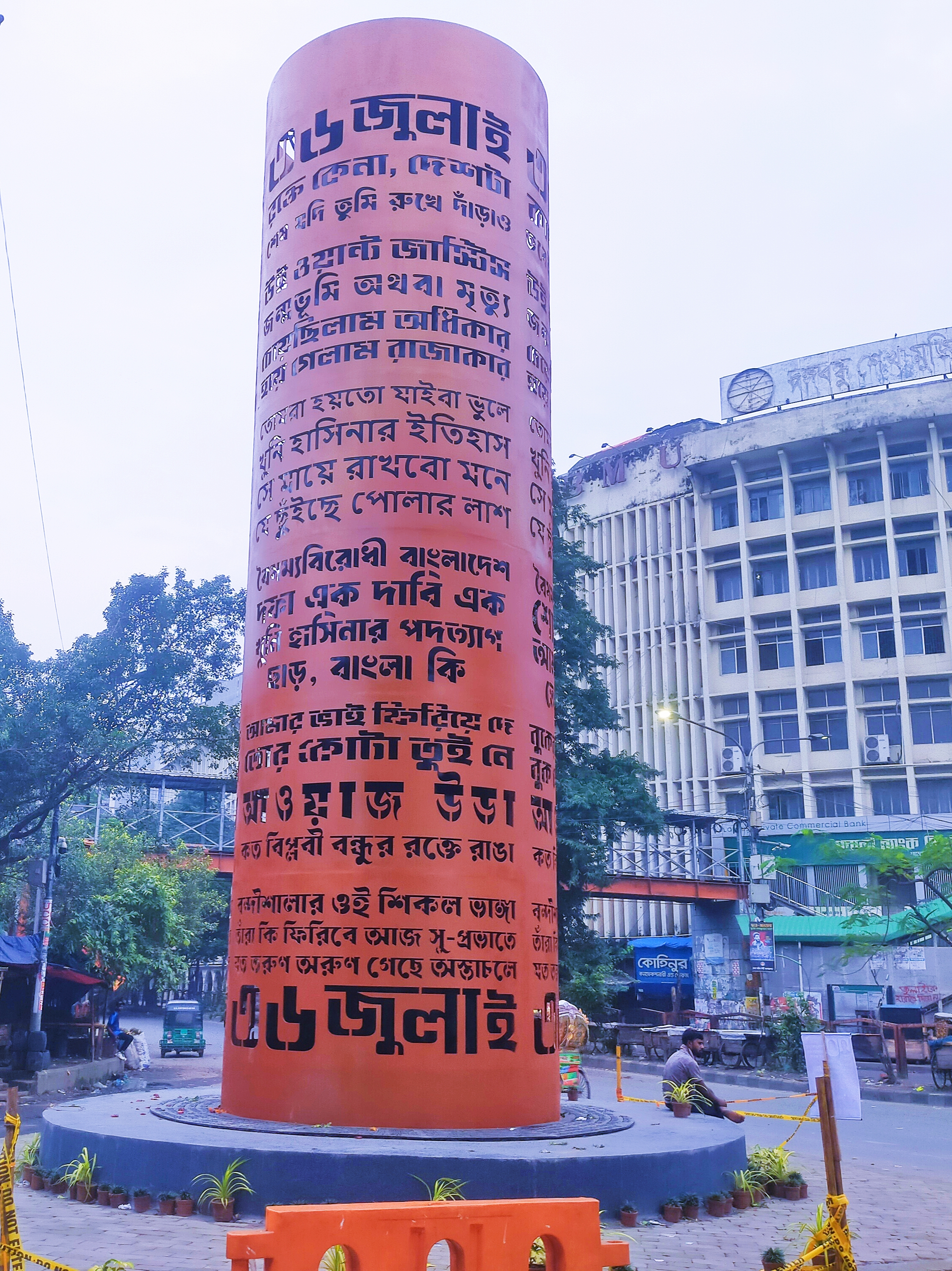

Razakar slogans were a series of protest chants from the 2024 Bangladesh quota reform movement. The slogans became the main rallying cry of the movement and played a significant role in the July Uprising. The slogans emerged following Prime Minister Sheikh Hasina reference to protesting students as "grandchildren of Razakars" during a press conference.

The slogans have been both praised as a mechanism to counter the deliberate political labelling by the Awami League government of protesters into freedom fighters (e.g. in favour power of liberation) or Razakar (e.g. the opposite power of liberation); and have also been criticised as running against the dominant political narrative of the Bangladesh Liberation War.

== Slogans ==
Students of the University of Rajshahi using the Razakar slogans on 14 July 2024 at 11:30 p.m. (BST)

Protesters in Muradpur, Chittagong chanting the slogan.

On 14 July 2024, Prime Minister Sheikh Hasina, during a press conference in the Ganabhaban, following her state visit to China, was asked a question by, Prabhash Amin, Head of the ATN News, regarding the protests questioning and stating,

If two equally qualified candidates stand before me — one the child of a freedom fighter and one the child of a Razakar — I would prefer to give the job to the child of the freedom fighter

In response, Hasina quoted,

Why so much anger against freedom fighters? If the grandchildren of freedom fighters don't get quota benefits, will those then go to the grandchildren of the Razakars? That's my question to the countrymen. This means that the children-grandchildren of freedom fighters are not talented, but the children-grandchildren of Razakar are talented, right?

In response to Sheikh Hasina's comment, in the early hours of 15 July, the students began using slogans such as:

Bengali:
চাইতে গেলাম,
চেয়েছিলাম অধিকার।,
হয়ে গেলাম রাজাকার।
Romanized:
Chaite Gelam,
Cheyecchilam Odhikar,
Hoye Gelam Razakar.
Translation:
We wanted rights,
but for that,
we became Razakar (traitor)!.

Protesters argued that Hasina’s statement indirectly labelled them as "Razakars" and demeaned them for advocating for quota reform, which led them to adopt the slogan.

Students further developed slogans that included the following:

Bengali:
তুমি কে? আমি কে?
রাজাকার! রাজাকার!
কে বলেছে? কে বলেছে?
স্বৈরাচার! স্বৈরাচার
Romanized:
Tumi Kē? Ami Kē?
Razākār! Razākār!
Kē Bolēcchē? Kē Bolēcchē?
Shoirāchār! Shoirāchār!
Translation:
Who are you? Who am I?
Razakar! Razakar!
Who has said? Who has said?
Autocrat! Autocrat!

== Reactions ==
Muhammad Zafar Iqbal, a Bangladeshi litterateur and former professor at Shahjalal University of Science and Technology condemned the slogans, as they made him associate the students with Razakars. In response, students of the university declared him a Persona non grata. Some political leaders, including Dipu Moni and Junaid Ahmed Palak, and several organizations, criticized the slogans as being disrespectful to the spirit of the Bangladesh Liberation War and to the country's history. In response to the protests, Sheikh Hasina clarified that her earlier remarks had not been directed at the students.

The slogans became a topic of widespread debate and were referenced in various literary and musical works. Later on, 15 September 2024, protesters at Dhaka University continued to use the slogan as a symbol of their movement.

The slogans appeared in a calendar related to the quota reform protests, marking the date of July 14. Asif Mahmud later shared an image of the calendar on social media and used it for the cover of his book "July: Motherland or Death". However, in the final version, the slogan was replaced with the phrase "Asche Phagun, Amra Hobo Digun" (lit. 'Spring is coming, we will double'), a change that attracted criticism from some quarters. On 16 August 2025, at the freedom fighter gathering of the Kaderia Bahini organized on the occasion of Makrai Day in Tangail Abdul Kader Siddique said,

"Do not mock the independence of Bangladesh. For those who chant Razakar slogans, remember this: there is no room for any Razakar in this country, now or in the future."

== In popular culture ==
Many songs, poems, articles and short stories had later been written over the slogan including by Hero Alam, Lemon Mahmud, T Mahmud, Anik Sahan, Anik Shutradhar, Newton Jr. etc. A song named "Awaz Uda" (Raise your voice) by Rapper Hanna was meanwhile made on these slogan theme.

Other songs are Shayan's "Bhoy Banglay", Moushumi's "Deshta Tomar Baper Naki", 'Baajan Amar Hoye Gyache Lash', Cezanne's 'Kotha Ko', 'Chobbisher Guerrilla', Parsa Mahzabeen's 'Cholo Bhule Jai', Coldcraft's 'Bayanna', Az Omix's 'Rokto', Mc-E-Mac and GK Kibrea's 'Slogan' and 'Inqilab', Siam Fardeen's 'Abu Saeed', Naheed Hasan's 'Jabab Dena', Revolution in Motion's 'Palte De Itihash', Voice of Revolution's 'Razakar', Lunatic's 'Bir' and Ridmaster's 'Desh Kaar'.
