= Razakar =

Loanword from Arabic used in the subcontinent

Razakar (Persian: رضا کار) is etymologically a Persian word which literally means volunteer. The word is also common in Urdu language as a loanword.

== In Pakistan and India ==
Razakars were an East Pakistani paramilitary force that aided the Pakistan Army against the Mukti Bahini during the Bangladesh Liberation War.

Police Qaumi Razakars are a volunteer force in Pakistan which aids the Police in their duties.

In Hyderabad, Razakars were volunteers sponsored by the Nizam's state of Hyderabad for opposition to its merger with India.

== In Bangladesh ==
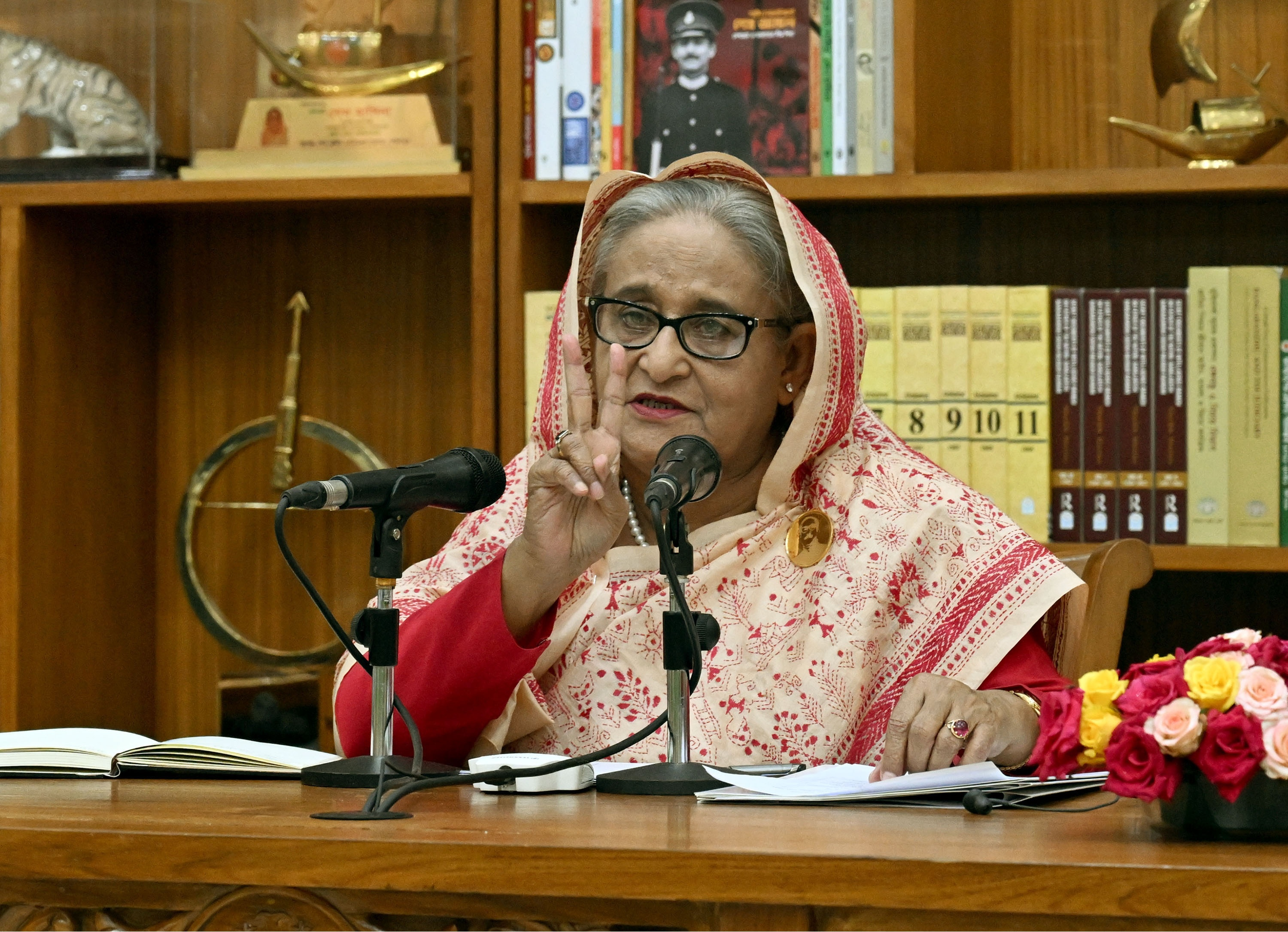
At this press conference on 14 July 2024, former Prime Minister of Bangladesh Sheikh Hasina linked the quota reform protesters to Razakars, drawing sharp criticism and further escalating the unrest that ultimately culminated in her resignation.

In Bangladesh and in Bengali, the term "Razakar" refers to individuals who opposed the country's independence and collaborated with the Pakistani Army during the Bangladesh Liberation War. It is a pejorative term, often equated to "traitor" or the biblical figure of Judas Iscariot. The term originates from the East Pakistani paramilitary force, the Razakars.

However, during the premiership of Sheikh Hasina, the term "Razakar" was predominantly used by the Awami League and its supporters as a synonym for "traitor." It was used to describe individuals who supported Pakistan or opposed the India's foreign policies on Bangladesh.

In 2024, the term resurfaced when it was used against protesters opposing the quota system. During the broader July Uprising in July 2024, many of these protesters adopted "Razakar slogans" to counter the Hasina administration’s labeling of them as "Razakars".
