= July Uprising =

2024 mass uprising in Bangladesh

- See other names Part of the Gen Z protests in Asia
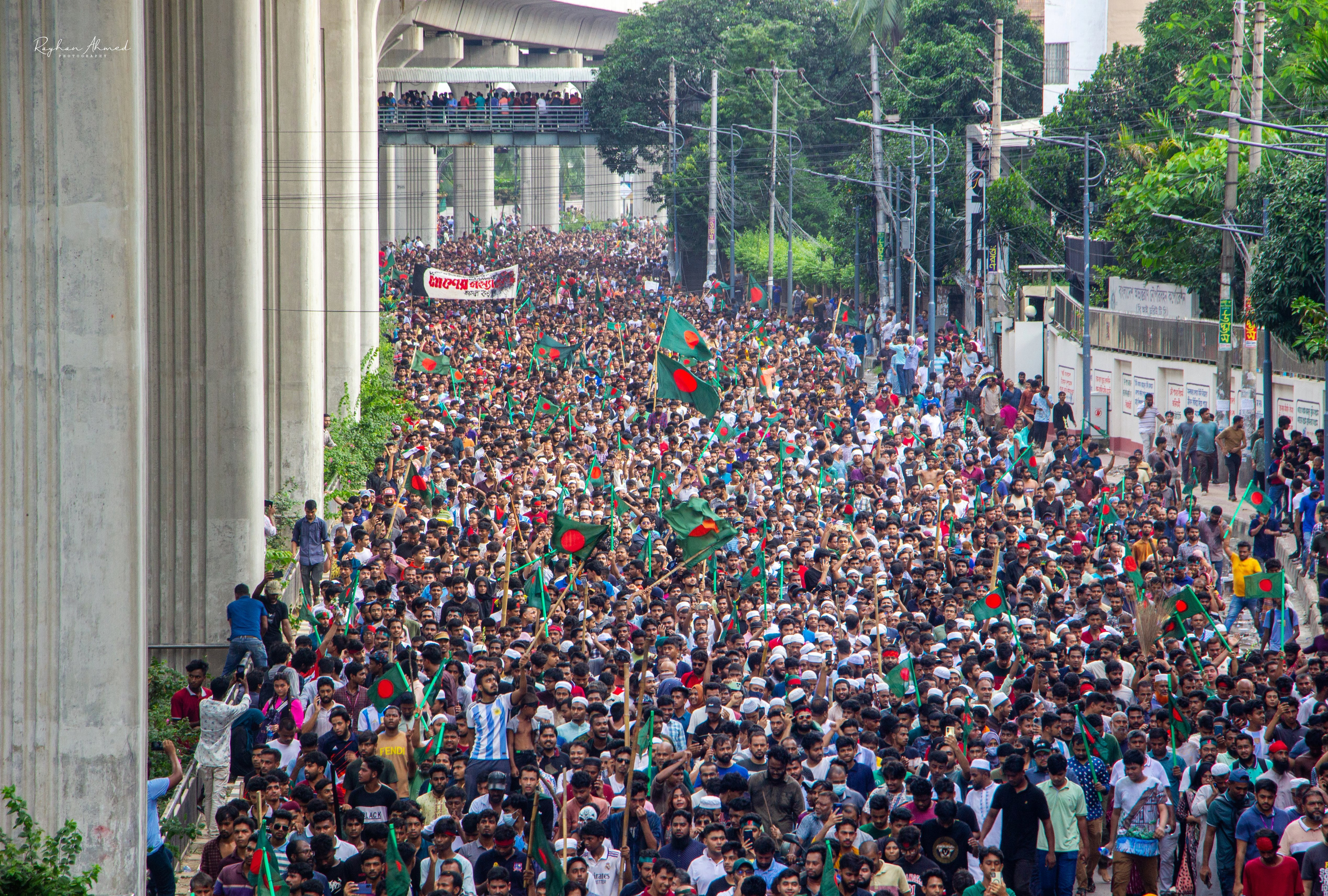
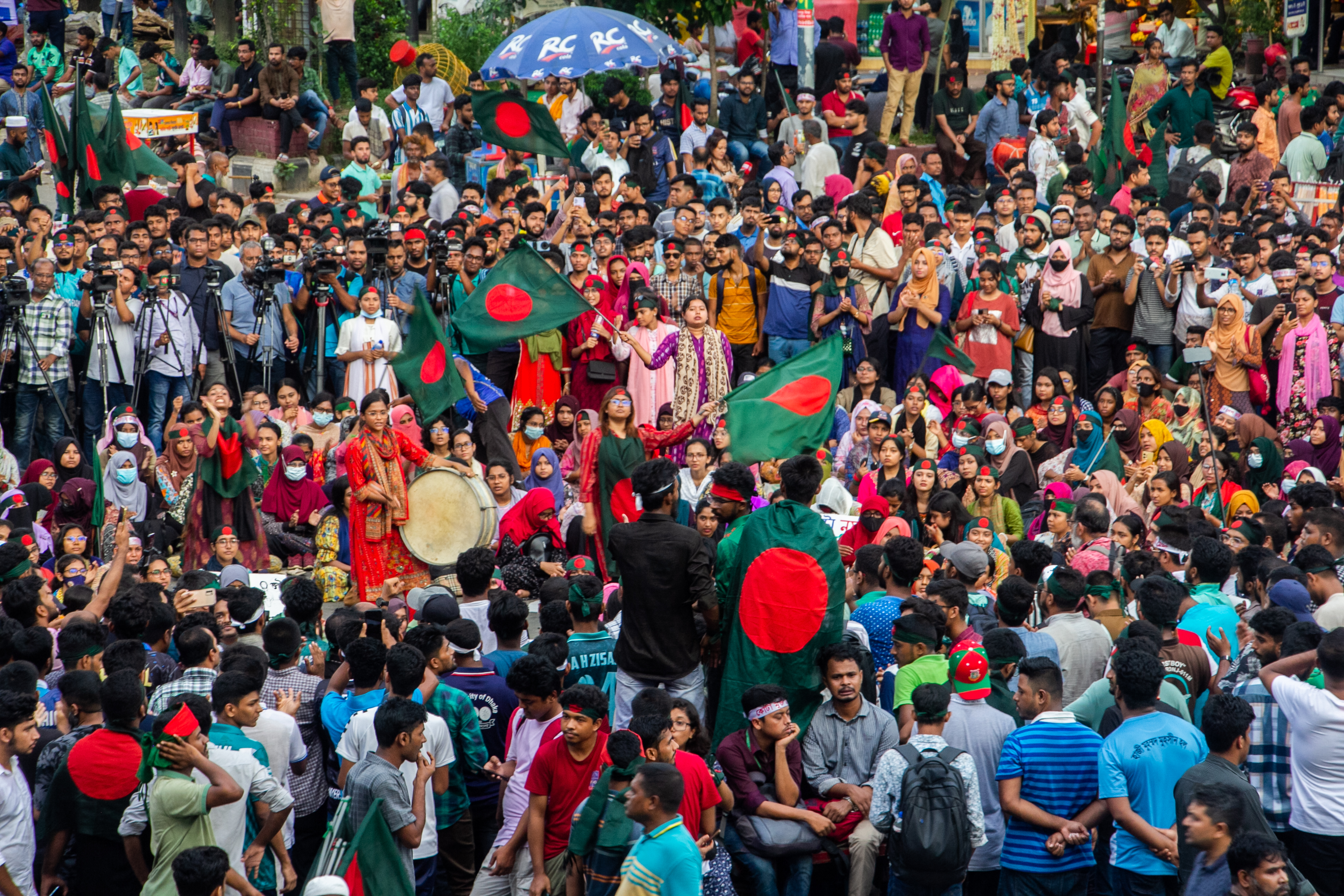
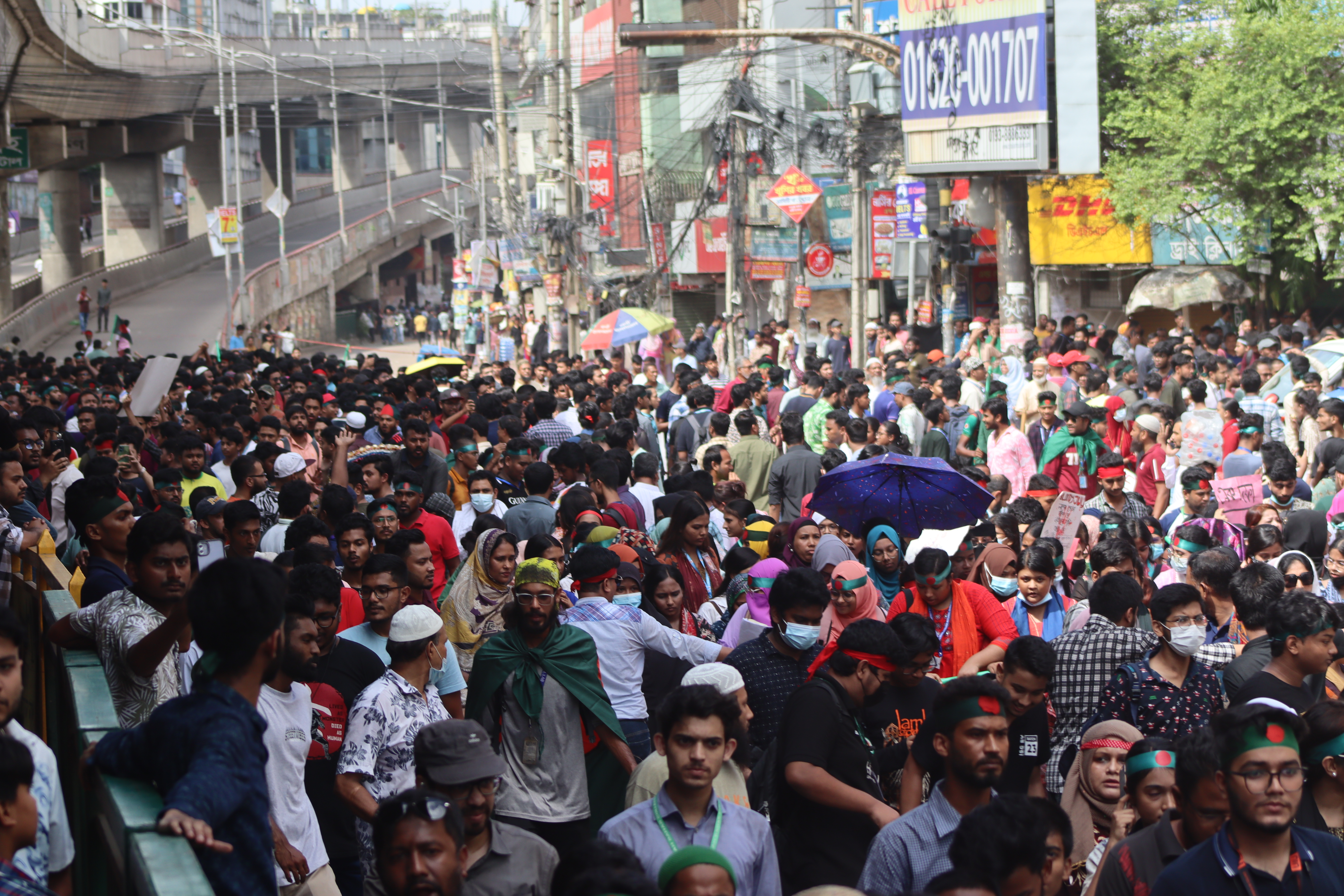
- Victory procession after the resignation of Sheikh Hasina in Shahbag, Dhaka Students launching Bangla Blockade during the quota reform movement in Shahbag, Dhaka General mass in the non-cooperation movement in Shantinagar, Dhaka
- Date: 6 June – 5 August 2024 (1 month and 30 days); Quota reform movement: 6 June – 3 August 2024; Non-cooperation movement: 4–5 August 2024
- Location: Bangladesh
- Caused by: Authoritarianism and human rights abuse under Sheikh Hasina regime; Economic depression; Retainment of the controversial job quota system; July massacre
- Goals: Initially focused on quota reform but then resignation of Sheikh Hasina and her cabinet
- Result: Successful: The Appellate Division of the Supreme Court orders 93% of recruitment in government jobs to be based on merit; Resignation of Sheikh Hasina and her exile to India; Constitutional crisis and formation of the interim government under Muhammad Yunus; Political and religious violence; (See aftermath)

Parties
Students Against Discrimination; Bangladesh Nationalist Party; Bangladesh Jatiotabadi Chatradal; Bangladesh Jamaat-e-Islami; Bangladesh Islami Chhatra Shibir; Gono Odhikar Parishad; Bangladesh Chhatra Odhikar Parishad; Gonotantrik Chhatra Shakti; Islami Andolan Bangladesh; Communist Party of Bangladesh; Bangladesh Students' Union; Socialist Party of Bangladesh; Socialist Students' Front; Ganosamhati Andolan; Non-political protesters: Students of universities, colleges, schools and madrasas; Bangladeshi diaspora; Workers of Bangladesh Bar Council; Public figures, influencers, actors, and others; Bangladesh Armed Forces; Bangladesh Army (since 3 August 2024)	Government of Bangladesh; Ministry of Home Affairs; Bangladesh Police; Armed Police Battalion; Detective Branch; Rapid Action Battalion; Bangladesh Ansar; Border Guard Bangladesh; Ministry of Defence; Bangladesh Armed Forces; Bangladesh Army (until 3 August 2024); Awami League; Bangladesh Chhatra League; Bangladesh Awami Jubo League; Bangladesh Awami Swechasebak League

Lead figures
Collective leadership: Nahid Islam; Asif Mahmud; Mahfuj Alam; Sarjis Alam; Hasnat Abdullah; Nusrat Tabassum; Shadik Kayem; And others...	Sheikh Hasina (surrendered); (Bangladesh) Asaduzzaman Khan (surrendered); Chowdhury Abdullah Al-Mamun (POW); Obaidul Quader (surrendered)

Casualties
- Deaths: 834+ (official gazette); 1,000+ (MOHFW estimate); 1,400+ (OHCHR estimate); 1,581 (SAD estimate)
- Injuries: 11,551+ (official gazette)
- Arrested: 11,702 (OHCHR estimate)

The July Uprising, (Note: Bengali: জুলাই অভ্যুত্থান, romanized: Julai Ôbhyutthan, pronounced [ˈdʒulai̯ ˌɔbʱːuˌtʰːan]) also known as the July Mass Uprising, (Note: Bengali: জুলাই গণ-অভ্যুত্থান, romanized: Julai Gôṇô-Ôbhyutthan, pronounced [ˈdʒulai̯ ˈɡɔnoˌɔbʱːuˌtʰːan]) Student-People's Uprising, (Note: Bengali: ছাত্র–জনতার অভ্যুত্থান, romanized: Chatrô–Jônôtar Ôbhyutthan, pronounced [ˈtʃʰatɾoˌdʒɔnoˌtaɾ ˈɔbʱːuˌtʰːan]) July Revolution, (Note: Bengali: জুলাই বিপ্লব, romanized: Julāi Biplôb) Gen Z Revolution, or Monsoon Revolution (Note: Bengali: বর্ষা বিপ্লব, romanized: Borshā–Biplob) was a mass uprising in Bangladesh in 2024. (Note: Multiple references:) Starting in early–June 2024, the uprising concluded with the resignation of Sheikh Hasina-led Awami League government on 5 August 2024, ending its 15 year-long regime. It has been described as the world's first successful Gen Z revolution, and was led by the Students Against Discrimination.

Beginning as a quota reform movement in June 2024 after the Supreme Court of Bangladesh reinstated the controversial government job quotas which reserved 30% of government job seats for the descendants of the freedom fighters, the protests intensified after Prime Minister Sheikh Hasina referred to the protesters as "grandchildren of Razakars", resulting in nationwide anti-government slogans and demonstrations. Following which, law enforcement agencies and activists of the ruling party, the Awami League, cracked down on the protesters, which resulted in the death of more than 1,000 people, making it the deadliest period since the independence of the country. Human rights organizations such as Amnesty International and Human Rights Watch blamed the government and its security force's violent response for the death of "students, journalists, and bystanders" that accounted for human rights abuse.

Although reinstated quotas were anulled by the Supreme Court soon after, the protests continued demanding justice for protesters deceased as a result of the movement. On 3rd August, a one-point demand, consisting of the resignation of Sheikh Hasina was announced by the protest coordinators. After an increased period of violence in the non-cooperation movement, Hasina resigned and exiled to India on 5th August. Her resignation triggered a constitutional crisis, as well as resulted in political and religious violence.

Coinciding with the first anniversary of the resignation of Hasina, on 5 August 2025, the uprising received constitutional acknowledgment with the announcement of the July Declaration by Chief Adviser Muhammad Yunus, which included a pledge to hold a free and fair general election and constitutional referendum on the July Charter alongside the election. The uprising left a profound impact in Bangladesh, influencing popular culture and sociopolitical discourse. It was a part of the wider Gen Z protests, influencing many other protests in Asia.

== Names ==
"July Uprising", "July Mass Uprising", "Student–People's Uprising" and "36 July" are the movement's most widely used names. On 3 August, one of the coordinators of the Students Against Discrimination, Nahid Islam said,

We haven't gone to August yet. We will go to August only after this July killings are judged.

— Nahid Islam

As a result, the movement is known as the "July Revolution". On 11 September, in an address to the nation, Muhammad Yunus called the events as "Student–Worker–People's Uprising" against fascism.

Other names of the protests include "Monsoon Revolution", "2024 Bangladesh Revolution", and "Gen Z Revolution".

== Background ==
After the Awami League was elected following the 2008 elections, it abolished the caretaker government system. Afterwards, the Awami League won three consecutive national elections in 2014, 2018 and 2024, considered by a vast majority of Bangladeshis as having been rigged in favour of the ruling party. Most political parties, including the opposition led by the Bangladesh Nationalist Party and Bangladesh Jamaat-e-Islami boycotted the 2014 and 2024 elections, in response.

During the government's 15-year tenure, the government carried out a massive crackdown on its political opponents, with opposition leaders being sidelined through charging them with false, fabricated cases. At this time, the dissemination of information in the media and the freedom of public expression was strictly regulated through laws such as the Digital Security Act, 2018. Since taking office in 2009, Sheikh Hasina's Awami League largely failed to fulfill job creation promises. While the public sector expanded with better pay and benefits, the political influence determined access to these jobs.

During this period, the government was reported to have used law enforcement forces and Awami League affiliates, particularly the Chhatra League, to manage and suppress various movements, including non-political ones. Allegations of violence and repression involving the Chhatra League were reported on multiple institutions and university campuses. Over the last three terms, allegations of corruption, money laundering, declining reserves, and irregularities in the banking sector were raised against Awami League leaders at various levels of the government. These issues were associated with rising living costs and growing public dissatisfaction. They also detained many dissenters in the name of counterterrorism.

== History ==
=== Quota reform movement ===
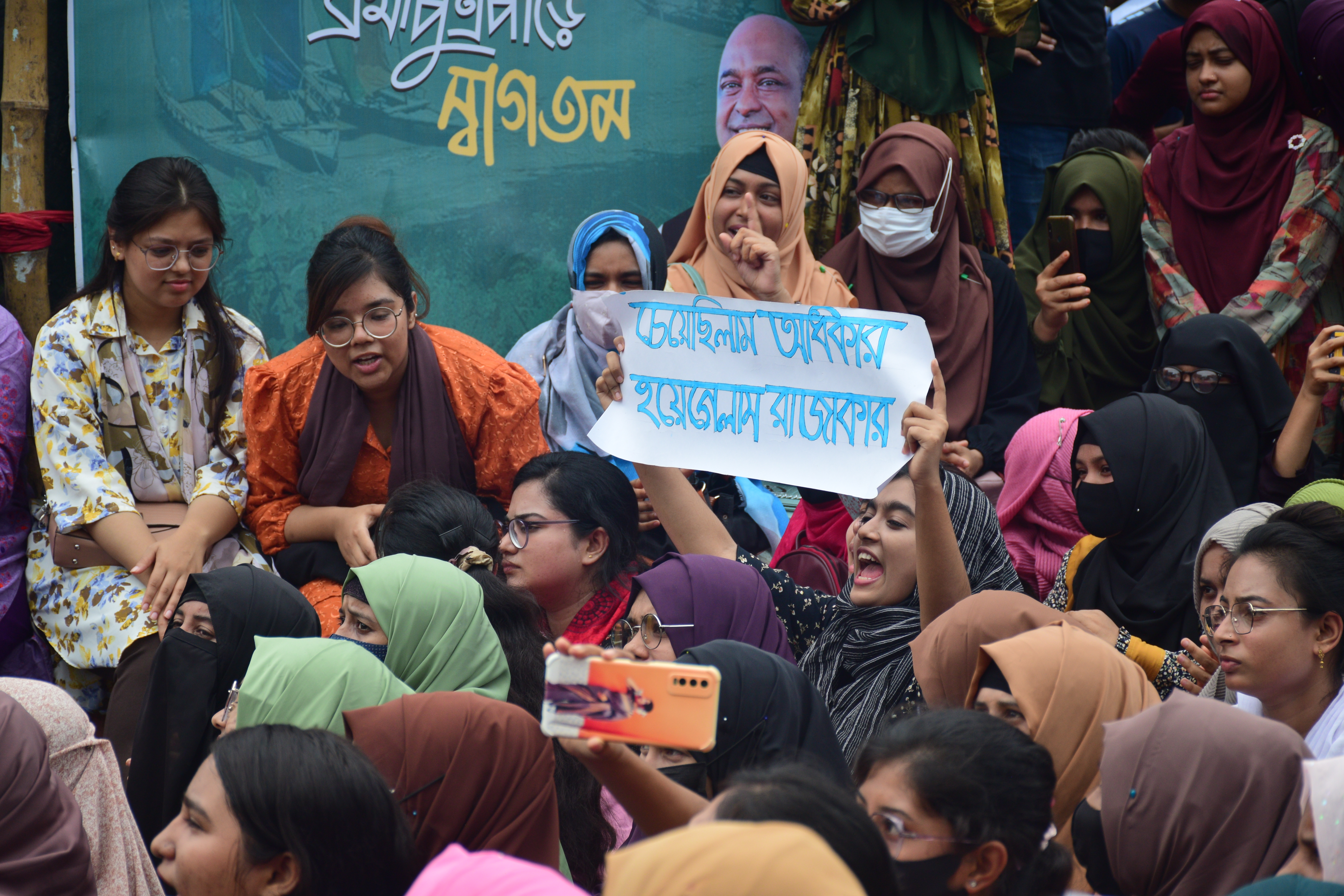
A group of female protesters, with one protester carrying a sign চেয়েছিলাম অধিকার, হয়ে গেলাম রাজাকার ("Sought for rights, became a Razakar")

In 2018, a mass movement arose in Bangladesh demanding quota reform in government jobs, led by the General Students' Rights Protection Council. The movement's main objective was to reform the ongoing quota system in Class I and II government jobs. After continuous agitation and pressure by students, the government announced the abolition of the 46-year-old quota system.

In 2021, seven children of freedom fighters, including Ahidul Islam, filed a written petition to the High Court challenging this decision. On 5 June 2024, a High Court bench of Justice KM Kamrul Quader and Justice Khizir Hayat declared the decision to scrap the quota system invalid. Immediately after the announcement of the verdict, students started protesting it at universities across the country.

The movement became more intense in July, with students staging blockades including the "Bangla Blockade". During this time, police used excessive force to quell the agitation. A protestor named Abu Sayed was shot dead by police in Rangpur, marking the first casualty in the movement. This incident made the movement more intense and increased tension across the country.

After that, the movement became violent, causing many more casualties because of attacks by law enforcement agencies, Chhatra League and Jubo League. A curfew was imposed across the country and the internet was shut down. The hearing date of the Appellate Division was later brought forward due to agitation.

Students Against Discrimination gained momentum when private university students joined on 16 July. In response to the escalating quota reform movement, the government mandated the closure of all educational institutions on 16 July 2024. On 17 July, students residing in dormitories at public universities across the nation, including University of Dhaka, were compelled to vacate their accommodations. Due to the permanent residency of a significant portion of private university students in Dhaka, their presence in the city noticeably increased on 18 July.

On that date, a substantial confrontation occurred between law enforcement and students affiliated with Primeasia University, BRAC University and East West University in the Rampura area. Simultaneously, students from American International University-Bangladesh, North South University, Independent University, Bangladesh, Dhaka International University and United International University staged demonstrations along Kuril Bishwa Road and Pragati Sarani. Concurrently, protests were initiated by students from Ahsanullah University of Science and Technology, Bangladesh University of Textiles, Southeast University in Mohakhali area and Northern University in the Uttara region.

=== Razakar slogans ===
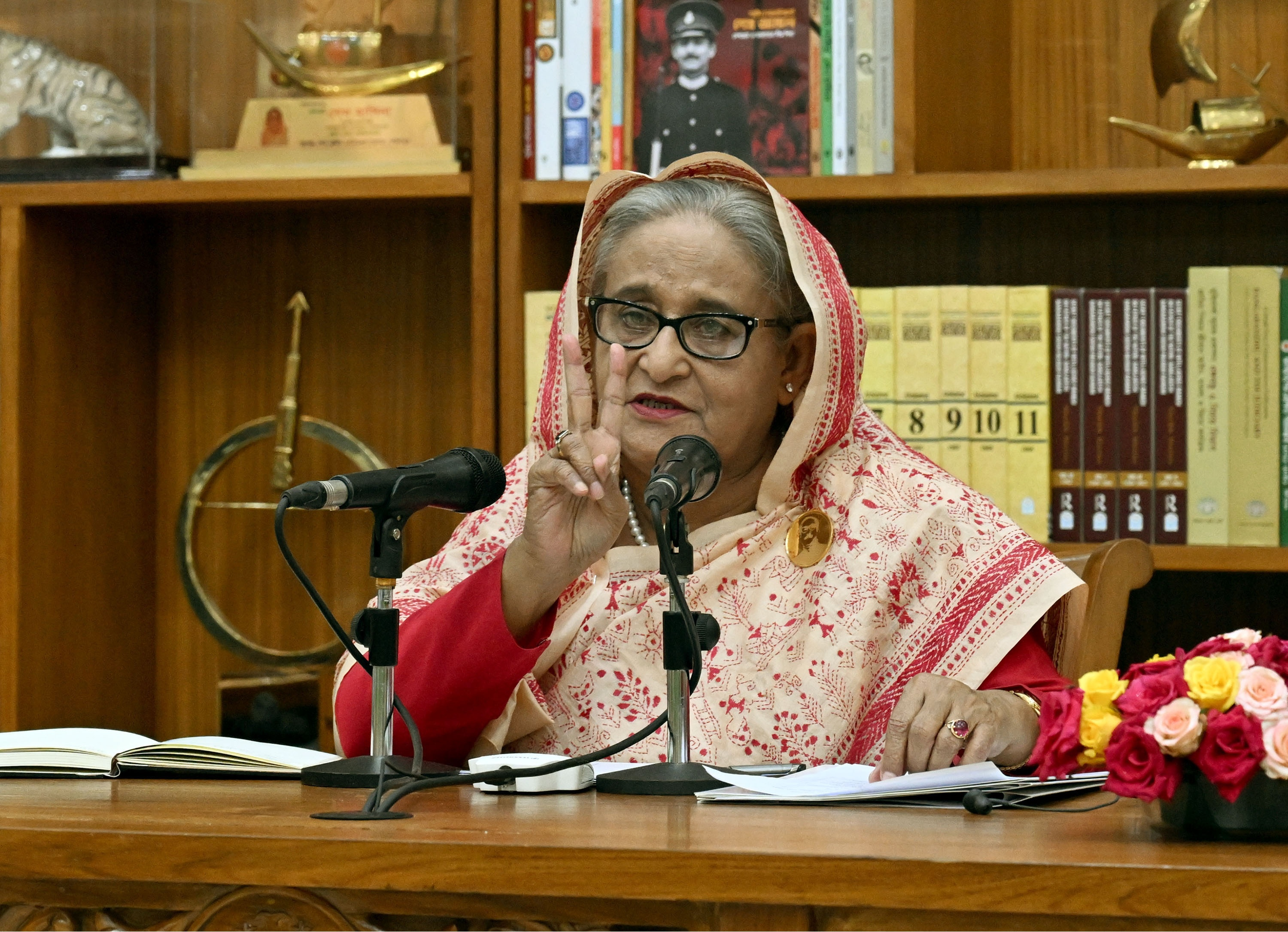
At this press conference on 14 July 2024, Sheikh Hasina linked the quota reform protesters to Razakars, drawing sharp criticism and further escalating the unrest that ultimately culminated in her resignation.

Students of the University of Rajshahi using the Razakar slogans on 14 July 2024 at 11:30 p.m. (BST)

On 14 July, during a press conference, Sheikh Hasina responded to a question about the protests:

If the grandchildren of freedom fighters don't get quota benefits, will those then go to the grandchildren of the Razakars? That's my question to the countrymen.

In response, in the early hours of 15 July, students began using slogans such as,

তুমি কে? আমি কে?
রাজাকার, রাজাকার।
কে বলেছে? কে বলেছে?
স্বৈরাচার, স্বৈরাচার!

lit. 'Who are you? Who am I?
Razakar, Razakar.
Who said it? Who said it?
Autocrat, Autocrat!'.

Protesters argued that Hasina's statement indirectly labelled them "Razakars" and demeaned them for advocating for quota reform, which led them to adopt the slogan.

=== Internet outage ===
To prevent the movement from spreading nationwide, the government ordered the internet shut down across the country. The shutdown began on 18 July and ended on 28 July. Social media platforms such as WhatsApp, Facebook, TikTok and YouTube remained restricted till 5 August.

Avatar of Cloudflare Radar

Cloudflare Radar
(@CloudflareRadar)
tweeted:

Bangladesh is experiencing a near complete #Internet outage after a government-ordered shutdown of mobile networks. Traffic and announced address space dropped to near-zero around 15:00 UTC (21:00 local).

19 July 2024

=== Judgment of the Appellate Division on the case ===
On 4 July, the Appellate Division of Bangladesh Supreme court declared the government's decision to invalidate the Freedom Fighter quota for the first time. The second categories of government jobs were also declared invalid without hearing the application of the state. It upheld the High Court's verdict for the time being and asked the state to file a leave of appeal. At that time Chief Justice Obaidul Hassan said that the movement was taking place but it is not possible to change the verdict of the High Court by just protesting on the streets.

Later on 10 July, the Appellate Division issued a four-week status quo order on the High Court verdict along with some observations and directions in view of the petition filed by the state party and two students. 7 August had been fixed for the next hearing.

When the full judgment of the High Court was published on 14 July, leave to appeal was filed by the state and two students. Based on the application of Attorney General AM Amin Uddin on 18 July, the Chamber Court of the Appellate Division of the Supreme Court, Justice M Enayetur Rahim fixed the date of hearing the case on Sunday, 21 July.

On 21 July, the Appellate Division reinstated the quota and quashed the judgment given by the High Court. At the same time, even though it is a policy-making matter for the government, in the interest of complete justice according to the constitution, the court ordered 93 percent merit-based recruitment in government jobs. On this day, for the first time in the history of Bangladesh, the proceedings of the Supreme Court were held under curfew.

=== Massacre ===
By early August 2024, the unrest resulted in a significant death toll both law enforcement and protesters. Initial official reports claimed 215 deaths, but a United Nations investigation later confirmed that at least 1400 people were killed. In August, the Interim government's Health and Welfare Adviser, Nurjahan Begum, reported that over 1,000 individuals had been killed in the uprising and more than 400 students had lost their eyesight. Additionally, more than 20,000 were injured, and over 11,000 were arrested nationwide. Among the deceased were at least 32 children, according to UNICEF. The exact number of casualties remain uncertain due to the Awami League government putting restrictions on information, including reports that hospitals were barred from sharing data, CCTV footage was confiscated by security forces, some killed were put in to secret mass graves and some victims were buried without identification.

The massacre, known as the July massacre, prompted significant criticism and calls for accountability. The University Teachers Network held a demonstration at the University of Dhaka, expressing concern over the violence.

Protibadi Nagorik Somaj condemned the killings during the movement, calling them a massacre and expressing doubts about the judiciary's ability to deliver impartial justice, as the inquiry commission was formed by the Hasina government, which is accused of involvement in the massacre. Some academics rejected the government-established public inquiry commission, calling for intervention by the United Nations.

In Sylhet, Nagorik Alem Somaj organized a protest criticizing the killings.

Sheikh Hasina, in her first public statement published through her son Sajeeb Wazed, since being ousted from power, called for an investigation into the deaths during the protests, while also asserting that the police and the Awami League were victims of "terrorist aggression."

Govinda Pramanik, president of the Bangladesh National Hindu Grand Alliance and a pro-Indian voice alleged that the government had killed over 500 innocent people to maintain power, urging that the events be prosecuted at the International Crimes Tribunal in Bangladesh.

Several labor unions and organizations also criticized the killings, demanding justice for those who lost their lives during the July massacre.

A protest march under the banner of Chittagong University Chhatra Dal in Chattogram demanded prosecution against Sheikh Hasina for the massacre.

The Left Democratic Alliance, Jatiya Samajtantrik Dal and the Anti-Fascist Left Front criticized the Awami League government rule, urging financial compensation for the families of those killed in the protests and free medical care for the injured. Similarly, the National Democratic Party demanded ৳10 million in compensation for the families of those who died during the massacre, along with a government job for at least one member of each affected family.

Islami Andolan Bangladesh called for an independent tribunal to ensure justice for the victims of the massacre. In addition, the People's Rights Party called for all political parties within the Grand Alliance, including Awami League, to be barred from future elections.

=== Non-cooperation movement ===
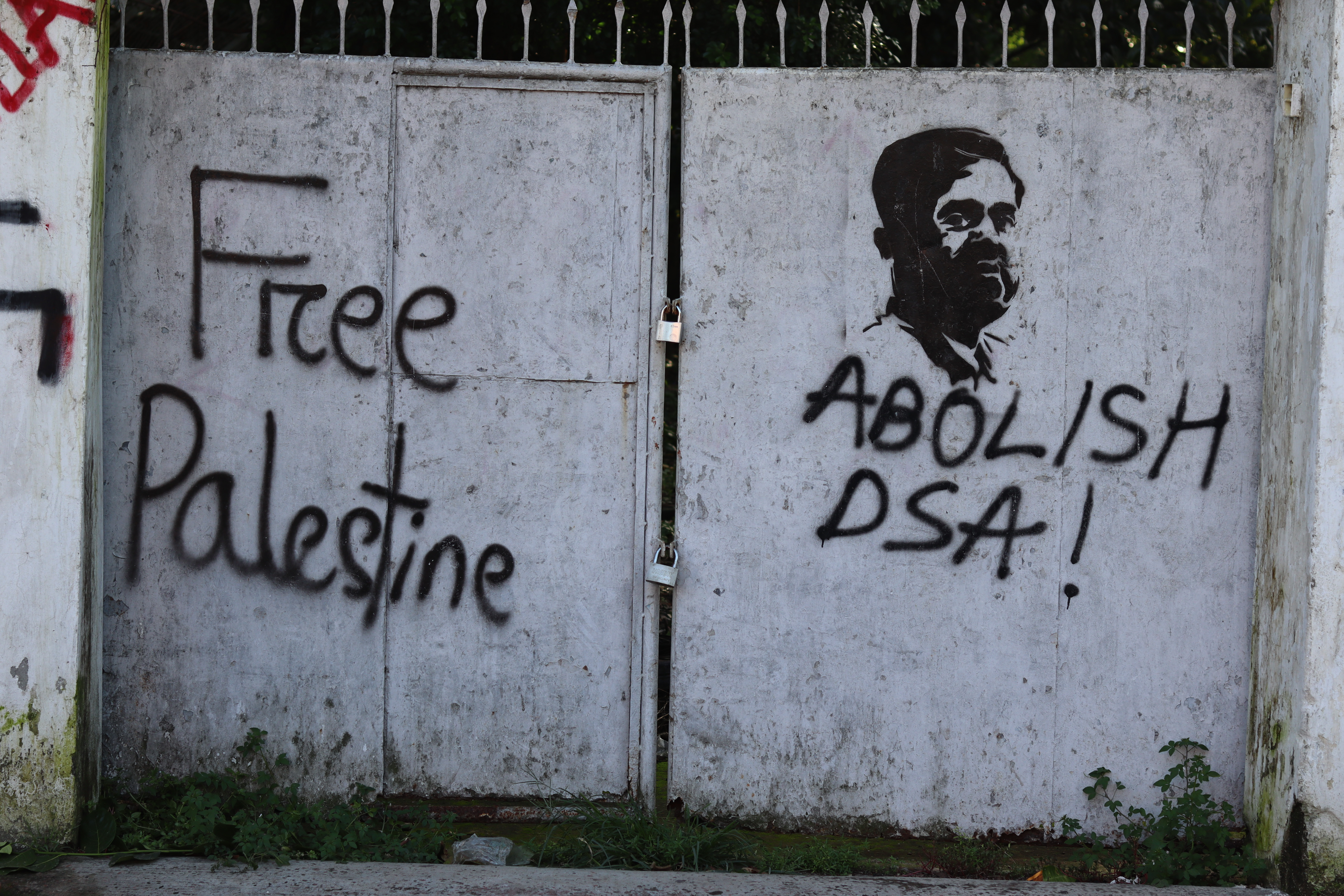
One point movement of Bangladesh in Dhaka University.

On 4 August, thousands of protesters gathered at the Shahbag intersection in the morning, obstructing it as a form of civil disobedience to demand the government's resignation.

Following the start of the Non-cooperation movement, various left-wing organisations in Bangladesh took part in protests. The Proletarian Party of East Bengal for example began a graffiti campaign within the city following the fall of Hasina and the Awami League aimed at criticising the army and calling for an end to military rule. Other far-left student groups also took part in the revolution, such as the Revolutionary Student-Youth Movement, a Marxist–Leninist–Maoist organisation.

At least 97 people died nationwide in confrontations, shootings, and pursuits related to the Non-cooperation movement. Fourteen police officers were killed across the country, with 13 deaths occurring during the Attack on Enayetpur police station in Sirajganj. Another officer was killed in Eliotganj, Comilla. Twenty-seven police facilities were attacked and vandalized, and a hundred policemen were injured in these incidents, according to an official statement by the Bangladesh Police.

In Dhaka, unidentified individuals set fire to and damaged various vehicles, including cars, ambulances, motorcycles, and buses, at the Bangladesh Medical University during the protests. Around 4.30 pm, 11th-grader Golam Nafiz was shot by the police in Dhaka Farmgate area. A photo of him being taken to the hospital on rickshaw went viral, inciting outrage. By 12 pm, users across the country reported internet inaccessibility. The government ordered the closure of Facebook, Messenger, WhatsApp, Instagram, and all other Meta-owned services, directing internet service providers to comply by 1 pm.

The government declared a three-day general holiday starting on 5 August, during which banks would also remain closed. Students Against Discrimination confirmed its intention to march towards Dhaka on 6 August to demand the Prime Minister's resignation. The Bangladesh University Teachers' Network proposed a framework for an interim government, suggesting it be composed of teachers, judges, lawyers, and representatives from civil society, reflecting the views of various civil and political groups for a democratic transition.

Asif Mahmud, a coordinator of Students Against Discrimination, announced that its march to Dhaka had been rescheduled for 5 August. He called on protesters and civilians nationwide to march toward the capital and participate in civil disobedience. Several former Bangladesh Army officers, including former chief of staff Iqbal Karim Bhuiyan, held a press briefing urging soldiers to return to camps and refrain from getting involved in the political crisis or being used against civilians.

Retired Brigadier General M. Sakhawat Hossain said there was significant unease among the troops, which likely pressured the chief of army staff as soldiers were deployed and witnessing the events. Retired officers, including Brigadier General Mohammad Shahedul Anam Khan, defied the curfew on Monday and took to the streets, with Khan noting that the army did not intervene. In response to calls for a march to Dhaka, DMP Commissioner Habibur Rahman warned of zero tolerance, saying legal action would be taken against curfew violators.

Students Against Discrimination rejected the curfew and encouraged everyone to march towards the Ganabhaban and Prime minister's office.

In the morning of 5 August 2024, units of the Dhaka Metropolitan Police and Armed Police Battalion committed the Chankharpul massacre to hold the area of Dhaka and disperse the approaching participants of the Long March to Dhaka. At first the police fired tear gas, sound grenades, and rubber bullets. Later, constable Md. Sujon Hossain of the Armed Police Battalion, fired live bullets indiscriminately at the protesters, leading to the deaths of seven people.

Reports indicated Sheikh Hasina had been moved to a secure location. On the same day, up to 135 people, including 24 police officers, were killed during protests.

=== Resignation of Sheikh Hasina ===
Hasina resigned on 5 August 2024, as large crowds of demonstrators surrounded the prime minister's residence. Her resignation was announced by General Waker-uz-Zaman, the Chief of the Army Staff. (Note: Multiple references:) Later that day, Hasina fled to India in a chaotic departure, first by car, then by helicopter, and finally by plane. She left with no resignation speech.

Hasina reportedly flew in a Bangladesh Air Force C-130 transport to Hindon Air Force base in Ghaziabad, India, where she was received by the Indian national security advisor Ajit Doval along with other senior military officials. (Note: Multiple references: to India.)

Indian foreign minister S. Jaishankar told the Parliament,

At very short notice, she requested approval to come for the moment to India.

Her son, Sajeeb Wazed, initially said that she would not return to politics and planned to "stay in Delhi for a little while" before her next destination, but subsequently said on 7 August that she and the Awami League would remain active in the Bangladeshi political scene and that she would return to the country once elections were declared. He also insisted that Sheikh Hasina was still the prime minister, saying that she was unable to formally submit her resignation after being forced to flee from the protesters. Hasina had hoped to go to London, but the United Kingdom reportedly rebuffed initial overtures seeking political asylum. She reportedly considered seeking temporary residence in the United Arab Emirates, Saudi Arabia, Belarus, or Qatar. Because her nephew lives in Finland, that country was speculated as a possible destination. Although Sajeeb Wazed lives in the U.S., she is considered unlikely to seek asylum there, as the U.S. government criticized her rule in Bangladesh.

Hasina was living in a secret location in India under tight security as of August 2024. Sajeeb Wazed said that the protests which led to her resignation had support from a foreign intelligence agency, without naming any country. In a statement published in the Indian media on 11 August, she accused the United States of influencing her resignation, and previously accused the United States of conspiring to oust her in the Jatiya Sangsad. However, Wazed called the statement "false and fabricated" and said Hasina "did not give any statement before or after leaving Dhaka". The White House also denied allegations of any US involvement. On 13 August, Hasina released her first confirmed statements since her overthrow published by Wazed Joy calling for an investigation into the killings made during the protests, while insisting that police and the Awami League were also victims of "terrorist aggression".

== Outside Bangladesh ==
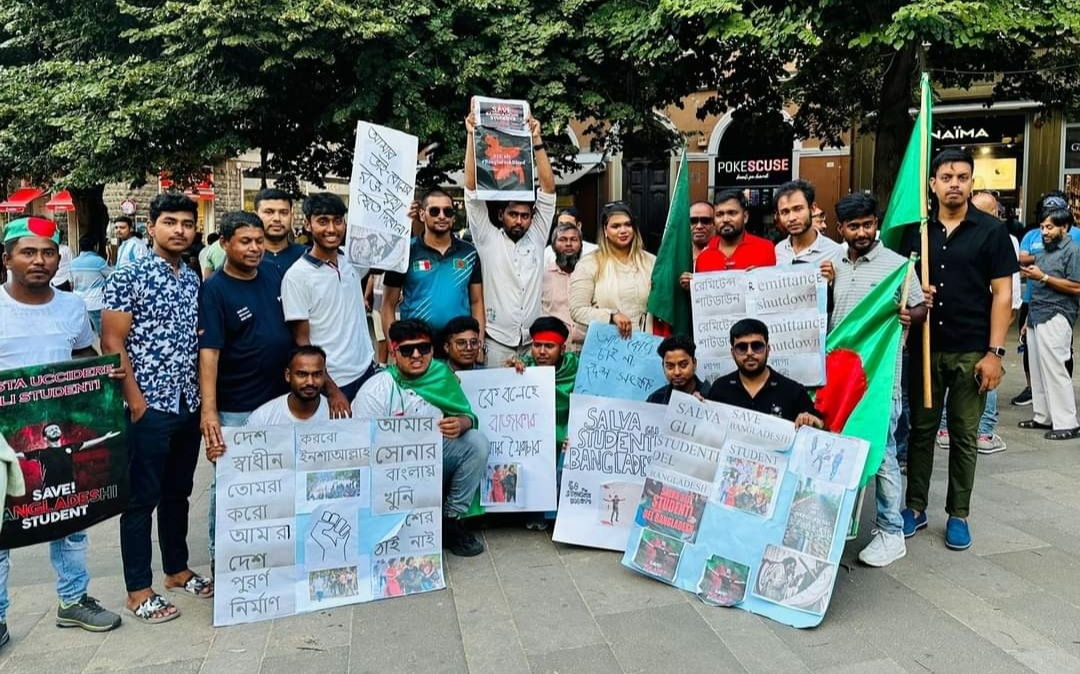
Bangladeshis in Ancona, Italy protesting in support of the movement.

The Bangladeshi diaspora in Italy, Canada, France, Qatar, the United Arab Emirates, the Maldives, the United Kingdom and Malta protested in solidarity with the protesters in Bangladesh.

In the UAE, a demonstration by Bangladeshi labourers also opposed the suppression of protesters, however, several of them were charged with holding protests and violating the UAE's laws against public demonstrations. Following a trial on 21 July, three defendants were sentenced to life imprisonment for "rioting", while 54 others received sentences ranging from 10 to 11 years and were ordered to be deported upon release. Human Rights Watch condemned their arrest, citing the country's restrictive laws and labour conditions as violations of human rights. A Bangladeshi lawyer, Wolora Afrin Rasna was hired by the country's interim government to secure the release of those imprisoned. Md. Touhid Hossain stated that Muhammad Yunus vowed that he would personally approach senior Emirati authorities to seek the release of those detained, and would also contact the "concerned government", if necessary. The detainees were later pardoned by UAE president Mohamed bin Zayed Al Nahyan on 3 September.

The Ministry's Spokesperson Fathimath Rifath said that expatriate workers in the Maldives are barred from political involvement in such an act, which amounted to a visa violation.

In India, the All India Democratic Students Organisation staged a protest in Kolkata in support of the Bangladeshi students. (Note: Multiple sources:)

In Nepal, on 20 July, the All Nepal National Free Students Union held a rally in solidarity with the quota reform movement in Bangladesh and to protest the killing of students.

== Fall of the government ==
On 4 August, thousands of protesters convened at Dhaka's Shahbag intersection in the morning, obstructing it as a form of civil disobedience to demand the resignation of the government. This was followed by hundreds of casualties. The following day, the protesters called for the "Long March to Dhaka" in defiance of a nationwide curfew to press Sheikh Hasina to resign. The long march of crowded people to Ganabhaban forced her to resign. She, along with her sister Sheikh Rehana, then fled the country to India via military on 5 August 2024.

Following the fall of the government, the Revolutionary Workers Party of Bangladesh organised a student assembly to meet with the interim government and consult on the policies of said government, meeting with parties like the BNP. While the Left Democratic Alliance held a conference on 11 August calling for the reconstitution of the Election Commission to initiate national parliamentary elections. The Left Democratic Alliance called for "an immediate overhaul of the electoral system, including the introduction of a "no vote" option, recall of elected representatives failing to meet public expectations, and the adoption of a proportional representation electoral system." In addition, as the interim government was formed in Bangladesh, it sat with various political parties on 5 October meeting with the Bangladesh Nationalist Party, Bangladesh Jamaat-e-Islami, Ganatantra Manch, Left Democratic Alliance, Hefazat-e-Islam Bangladesh and Islami Andolan Bangladesh.

== Death toll ==
By early August 2024, the unrest resulted in a significant death toll. Initial official reports claimed 215 deaths, but a United Nations investigation later confirmed that at least 650 people were killed. In August, the Interim government's Health and Welfare Adviser, Nurjahan Begum, reported that over 1,000 individuals had been killed in the uprising and more than 400 students had lost their eyesight. Additionally, more than 20,000 were injured, and over 11,000 were arrested nationwide. Among the deceased were at least 32 children, according to UNICEF. In January 2025, the interim government of Bangladesh published a gazette containing the initial finalized list of 834 recorded deaths. However, the actual number of casualties may be higher due to restrictions imposed by the previous government, which included barring hospitals from sharing data, confiscating CCTV footage, and burying some victims without proper identification.

On 12 February 2025, the United Nations Office of the High Commissioner for Human Rights published a thorough report on the events that took place from 1 July to 5 August 2024, which suggested a death toll of 1,400. A list of 44 Bangladesh police personnel was published in October 2024 by the Interim government who died during July-August.

=== Selected individual deaths ===
==== Abu Sayed ====
Abu Sayed (Bengali: আবু সাঈদ; c. 1999 – 16 July 2024) was a Bangladeshi student activist who was shot dead by the Bangladesh Police on 16 July 2024, while participating in the 2024 Bangladesh quota reform movement. Abu Sayed was a student of Begum Rokeya University, Rangpur and was involved in the protest in front of the university when the police engaged in lathi charges and opened fire on the students.

==== Mir Mugdho ====
Mir Mahfuzur Rahman Mugdho (Bengali: মীর মাহফুজুর রহমান মুগ্ধ; 9 October 1998 – 18 July 2024) was a Bangladeshi student activist and freelancer, in the 2024 Bangladesh quota reform movement, who was shot dead while distributing food, water and biscuits during the protest. His death is widely recognised as a pivotal point in the July Uprising.

==== Md. Golam Nafiz ====
Md. Golam Nafiz (Bengali: মো. গোলাম নাফিজ; 22 May 2008 – 4 August 2024), was a Bangladeshi student activist who died in the Non-cooperation movement (2024) on 4 August 2024. He was photographed on a rickshaw on the way to the hospital, the image of which was well-publicized among the many fatalities of the July Uprising.

=== Discrepancies and Fake cases ===
However, later investigations threw light on some discrepancies. Several people, despite being outside the country at the time of the uprising were indicted on charges of directly participating in armed attacks on the streets. Additionally, names of politically influential people were included in complaints without the knowledge of the victims' family. Some people who were believed to be deceased were also found to be alive. For instance, a complaint claimed that an individual named Md. Babu had been killed by police gunfire during the 19 July 2024 protests, but the final investigation report, submitted on 26 October 2025, found that the purported victim was actually Md. Shakil, who was alive and working in Saudi Arabia. The complaint named Sheikh Hasina among other Awami League leaders. Similarly, investigators found that another alleged victim by the name of Parvez Ali did not exist. A murder case filed in September 2024 accused former PM, former Dhaka South mayor, former Jubo League chairman among several other leaders and police officials of killing Parvez during the protests. However, the Police Bureau of Investigation found no evidence that Parvez ever existed.

As of July 2026, no action was taken against the attempted murder cases that investigations have found to be false.

== Aftermath ==
=== Formation of interim government ===
Bangladesh's army chief Waker-uz-Zaman, announced on 5 August 2024, that an interim government would be formed in the country after Prime Minister Sheikh Hasina resigned and fled to India.

On 8 August 2024, Muhammad Yunus took oath as the Chief Advisor of the Interim Government of Bangladesh in Bangabhaban, Dhaka in the presence of President Mohammed Shahabuddin.

=== Constitutional crisis ===
A constitutional crisis emerged on 5 August 2024, following Sheikh Hasina's resignation, because the existing constitution has no provisions for an interim government or any other form of government in the event that the prime minister resigns and the parliament is dissolved. Although Article 123 of the constitution mandates general elections within 90 days following the dissolution of parliament, no clear guidelines exist for the powers and structure of an interim government. Following the oath-taking of the interim government, student leader and ICT adviser Nahid Islam announced that a constituent assembly election would be held to draft and adopt a new constitution to resolve the crisis. The interim government also established a Constitutional Reform Commission to prepare a roadmap for the general election.

=== Alleged judicial coup attempt ===
On 10 August 2024, a plenary meeting of the Appellate Division judges was scheduled, a move considered irregular and unconstitutional by many observers, including LDP Secretary-general Redwan Ahmed. This meeting was perceived as a prelude to issuing a ruling that could undermine the interim government and potentially pave the way for Hasina's return.

Hasnat Abdullah, one of the coordinators of the Students Against Discrimination, called for protests to be held at the Supreme Court premise. Mass protests erupted outside the Supreme Court, with hundreds of students under the banner of Anti-discrimination Students Movement, lawyers, and civil society members demanding Hassan's resignation. They accused him of attempting to use the judiciary to restore Hasina to power, calling him a "puppet" of the former regime. Asif Mahmud, one of the Adviser to the interim government, criticized Chief Justice Obaidul Hassan for convening a full court meeting of the court's Appellate Division without consulting the government and demanded his resignation. The judges including Chief Justice Obaidul Hassan resigned following the protests.

=== Formation of a political party by activists ===
It was initiated by the Students Against Discrimination and the Jatiya Nagorik Committee. It was established on 28 February 2025 as the first student-led political party in the history of Bangladesh.

=== Subsequent protests ===
==== Police strike ====
On 6 August, the Bangladesh Police Service Association initiated a strike, demanding enhanced security measures for its members. The association expressed regret for the role of the police force in the recent unrest and violence. It stated that its officers were "forced to open fire", subsequently being portrayed as the "villain". Students and several paramilitary personnel were subsequently seen directing traffic and maintaining law and order functions in Dhaka, while Bangladesh Air Force personnel were deployed to secure Hazrat Shahjalal International Airport. The newly appointed Inspector General of Police, Md. Mainul Islam, issued an order for all officers to report for duty by the evening of 8 August. On 11 August, retired Brigadier General M. Sakhawat Hossain, serving as the adviser for home affairs in the interim government, appealed to police officers to resume their duties at their respective stations. He provided assurances that their grievances would be addressed and their demands fulfilled. The strike ended on 11 August following a meeting between the association and the interim government. By 15 August, regular operations at all 639 police stations nationwide had resumed.

==== Bangladesh Bank protest ====
On 7 August, several officials from the Bangladesh Bank initiated a protest near the governor's office. Their objective was to compel the resignation of certain high-ranking officials due to their alleged involvement in corruption. That same day, one of the bank's deputy governors resigned, with three others expressing their intention to follow suit. On 9 August, the bank's governor, Abdur Rouf Talukder, resigned from his position, citing personal reasons.

==== Hindu rights protest ====
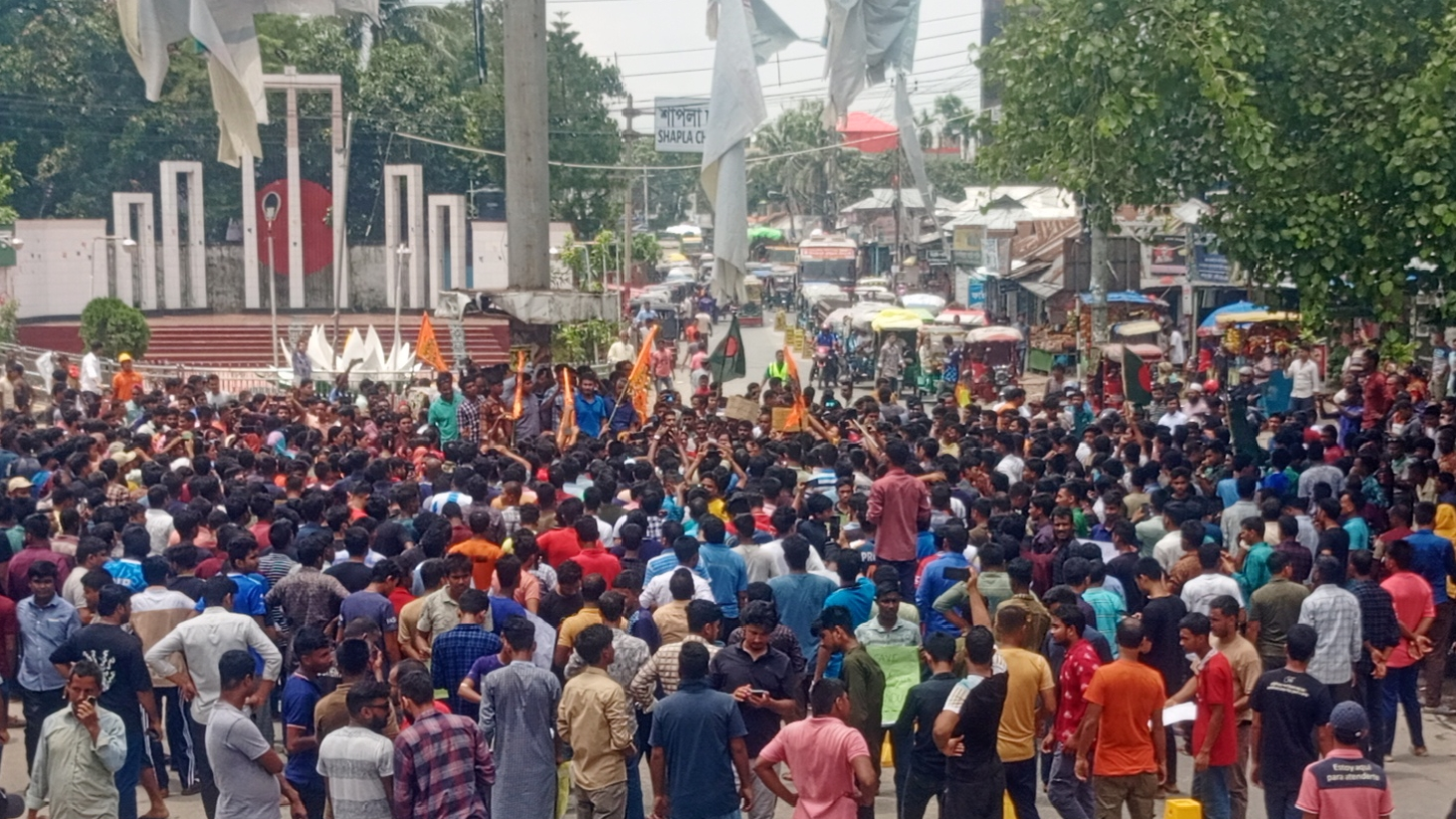
Hindu community demonstrating in Kurigram

On 9 August, the Bangladesh Hindu Jagran Mancha organized a protest in Dhaka condemning the attacks on Hindus. The group called for the establishment of a Ministry of Minorities and a Minority Protection Commission, the implementation of strict laws against attacks on minorities, and a 10% quota in parliament for minority groups. Protests against anti-Hindu attacks were also held in Tangail and Khulna.

==== Awami League demonstration ====
On 9 August, thousands of Awami League supporters staged a two-hour blockade on a section of the Dhaka–Khulna highway in Gopalganj, demanding Sheikh Hasina's return. The next day, an intervention by the army to disperse the protestors escalated into a confrontation. The clash resulted in 15 individuals being injured and an army vehicle being set ablaze.

==== Resistance Week ====
On 13 August, the Students Against Discrimination announced a campaign called "Resistance Week", centred around four key demands. These demands included the creation of a special tribunal for the speedy trials of July massacre during the quota reform and non-cooperation movements; justice for the attacks on minorities following Sheikh Hasina's resignation; the removal of government officials who supported the government, opposed the movement and suppressed the activists; and ensuring equality for discriminated officials in government sectors.

==== Occupation of Dhanmondi 32 ====
On 15 August, protesters occupied the Dhanmondi 32 area of Dhaka to prevent Awami League supporters from marching to Sheikh Mujibur Rahman's residence to commemorate the anniversary of his assassination in 1975, a day designated by the Hasina administration as a National Day of Mourning. Thirty people were held by protesters on suspicion of association with the Awami League, particularly those who were found to be carrying images of Sheikh Mujibur or other information relating to the Awami League in their possession or on mobile phones. Protesters were also accused of harassing journalists filming the event following complaints by correspondents from Reuters, The New York Times, and other media outlets. An Awami League activist was injured in the incident and later succumbed of his injuries on 30 August.

The BNP also called for a nationwide sit-in on 15 and 16 August, demanding that Sheikh Hasina be put on trial for genocide in connection with the killings of protesters.

==== Ansar protest ====
On 25 August 2024, a faction of the Bangladesh Ansar, a paramilitary force responsible for securing government installations and assisting law enforcement, protested at the Bangladesh Secretariat. They demanded the nationalisation of their jobs and the abolition of the six-month "rest system", a mandatory leave period after three consecutive years of work. Jahangir Alam Chowdhury, Home Affairs Advisor of the interim government, met with the protesters, announcing a preliminary decision to abolish the rest system. He also assured them that a forthcoming committee would review their demand for job nationalisation. Despite this, the Ansar members were dissatisfied due to the lack of immediate guarantees regarding job nationalisation. Later that day, a clash between Ansar members and a group of students resulted in 50 injuries. On 26 August 303 Ansar members were arrested for unlawful assembly, and nine deputy directors and ten Directors of Ansar were transferred from their posts. The DMP prohibited any rallies, meetings, or demonstrations in the vicinity of the Bangladesh Secretariat and the Chief Adviser's residence. One person later died of injuries they sustained after being caught in the clashes on 4 September.

==== Jumma protest ====
On 20 September, a protest march was organized by a Jumma students' body, starting from the Anti Terrorism Raju Memorial Sculpture and ending at Shahbagh, to protest against the recent violence targeting Jumma people in Khagrachhari.

==== Gender-based violence and public backlash ====
On 24 February 2025, a protest march was organised, starting from the Shaheed Minar, Dhaka to the Bangladesh Secretariat, demanding among many things the resignation of Adviser of Home Affairs Jahangir Alam Chowdhury for his perceived failure to quell crimes against women in the aftermath of the revolution. The march was stopped by the police before reaching secretariat premise, but the agitators issued a 24-hour ultimatum to meet their demands.

On 13 March 2025, a torch march was organised at the Anti Terrorism Raju Memorial Sculpture to protest the death of an 8-year-old girl who died from injuries after being raped by her father-in-law while visiting her elder sister's house six days earlier at Sreepur Upazila, Magura. The incident sparked widespread public outrage, with the house of the accused burnt down by a mob. Jatiya Chhatra Shakti general secretary Fahid Ahmed Chaudhury demanded resignation of the Home Advisor for this incident. The BNP also criticised the inability of the interim government to quell crimes against women, especially minors.

=== Misinformation in India ===
Sensationalist Indian media outlets, especially those closely associated with the ruling party in India, the Bharatiya Janata Party, portrayed the mass uprising as an Islamist-backed military takeover of the country purportedly orchestrated by India's rivals, Pakistan (through its intelligence agency) and China.

== Impacts ==
=== Geopolitical ===
The fall of Sheikh Hasina's regime marked a significant shift in Bangladesh's national politics. Democratic advocates have been reinvigorated, though they face ongoing instability. Geopolitically, both India and China had supported Hasina due to their security and economic interests, while the United States, despite strained relations, considered her government a strategic partner. With her removal, international observers are cautiously monitoring the potential emergence of a more democratic Bangladesh, propelled by the movement. China may find opportunities to expand its influence amid the upheaval, but its potential gains are moderated by Bangladesh's political uncertainty, economic challenges, and the involvement of other international actors, such as the US. Pakistan and Bangladesh have taken steps to improve their relationship, with the Pakistani Foreign Office releasing a statement of solidarity and Prime Minister Shehbaz Sharif hoping to "settle outstanding issues".

=== Financial ===
On 6 August, the Dhaka Stock Exchange (DSE) saw a positive reaction from investors during its first opening since Sheikh Hasina resigned. The broad-based index of the DSE, DSEX, experienced its largest increase since 3 January 2024. Twelve stocks reached their upper circuits, which permit a maximum daily price increase of 10%. This marked a significant improvement from the previous few weeks of student protests, during which most stocks were hitting their lower circuits, restricting the daily price fall to no more than 3%. The indices began with a substantial upward gap, which is considered the strongest opening in the last three to four years.

In the 2024–2025 fiscal year, Bangladesh registered an annual GDP growth rate of 3.49%, down substantially from immediate prior fiscal periods, representing a period of stagnation during the tenure of the interim government. Muhammad Yunus granted a number institutions affiliated with him, including Grameen-related organizations in substantial tax relief.

== Prosecutions ==
On 13 August, a murder complaint was filed at a court in Dhaka against Sheikh Hasina and six other government officials, including former Home Minister Asaduzzaman Khan and former Transport and Bridges Minister and concurrent Awami League secretary-general Obaidul Quader, regarding the killing of a grocer during the protests on 19 July. That same day, the Bangladesh Nationalist Party also submitted a formal request to the United Nations requesting for it to conduct an international investigation into the killings during the protests. In a phone call with chief adviser Muhammad Yunus on 14 August, UN human rights chief Volker Türk said that such an investigation would come "very soon".

On 14 August, the father of a student killed during the protests filed a petition at the International Crimes Tribunal calling for an investigation on charges of genocide and crimes against humanity against Sheikh Hasina and nine others, including Obaidul Quader and Asaduzzaman Khan, over their role in the crackdown on the protests. The Awami League and its associated organisations were also named as accused in the petition, which was formally investigated by the court later that day. The court began legal proceedings to have Sheikh Hasina extradited on 8 September. On 15 August, two additional murder charges were filed against her and several of her associates over the deaths of two people during the protests. On 16 August, another murder charge was filed against Sheikh Hasina, former education minister Mohibul Hasan Chowdhury and several others over the death of a college student during the protests in Chittagong on 18 July.

On 17 August, former shipping minister Khalid Mahmud Chowdhury was charged over an attack on a student protest on 18 July.

On 27 August, the interim government dissolved a committee created under Sheikh Hasina's government to investigate the deaths of students during the protests.

The Chief Prosecutor of the International Criminal Tribunal, Mohammad Tajul Islam, said that he had received preliminary evidence of the presence of citizens of other countries in police uniforms during the protest.

== Legacy ==
=== Nomenclature and satire ===
On 3 August, coordinator Nahid Islam stated, "We haven't gone to August yet. We will go to August only after this July killings are judged." Consequently, protesters adopted the non-standard date "July 36" to commemorate 5 August. The term appeared in graffiti and media, with Al Jazeera referring to 4 August as "35 July".

==== Chalaiden ====
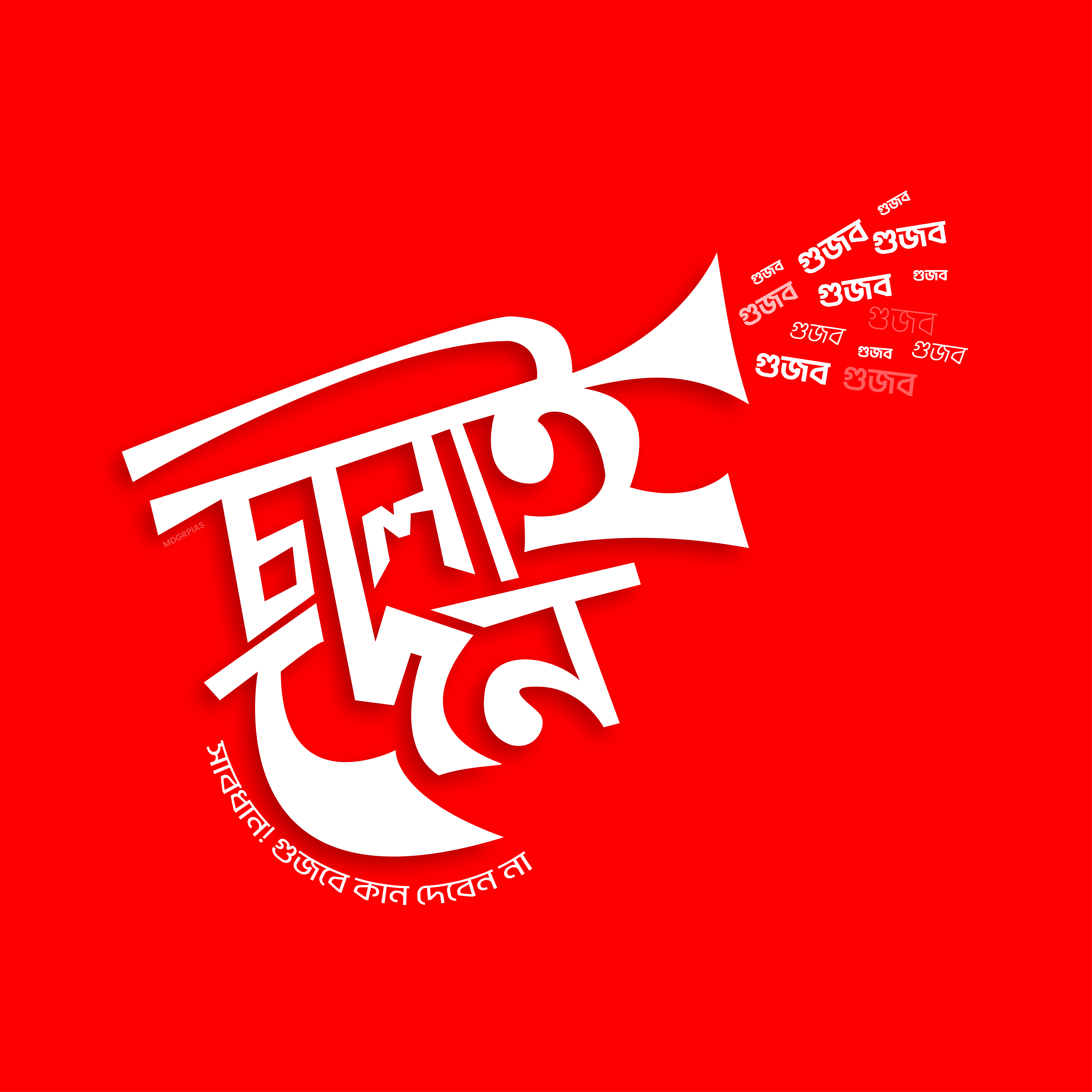
A symbolic image of the "Chalaiden" meme

Chalaiden (Bengali: চালাইদেন), (Note: Also spelled Chalai den (Bengali: চালাই দেন); a corruption of the Bengali phrase Cāliẏē din (চালিয়ে দিন), literally 'spread it' or 'go ahead'.) or Source: Chalai den (Bengali: সোর্স: চালাই দেন), is a satirical internet meme that emerged on social media in Bangladesh during the July Uprising, as well as the events that followed. The term gained traction after a leaked WhatsApp screenshot showed a Chhatra League member instructing others to fabricate fake news and "Chalai den" (Spread it). It was subsequently used sarcastically against unsubstantiated claims regarding protest coordinators and, later, the interim government. In October 2024, advisor Asif Mahmud referenced the meme in a social media post to debunk rumors.

=== Reception ===
International media, including The Guardian and CNN, dubbed the events the world's first successful "Gen Z revolution." (Note: Multiple sources:) John Reed of the Financial Times called it the "Monsoon Revolution", while analyst Nazmul Ahsan Kalimullah referred to it as the "Bangla Spring". The movement was notable for unprecedented female participation, a rarity in Bangladeshi politics, with student leaders like Nusrat Tabassum and Umama Fatema serving as key coordinators.

=== Arts and media ===
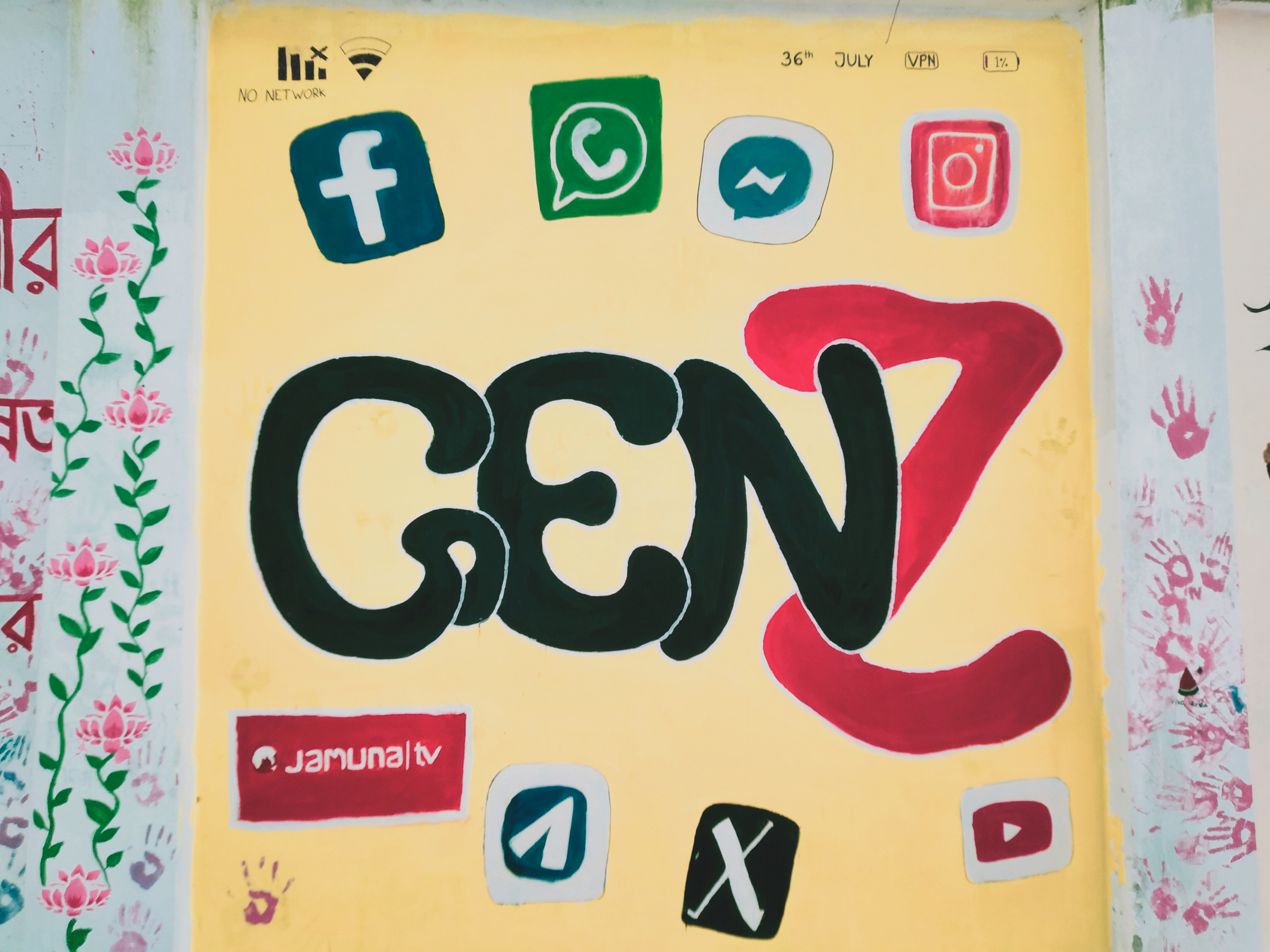
Graffiti in Tongi depicting the role of media in the movement.

The uprising sparked a surge in artistic expression. Hundreds of satirical cartoons and graffiti works appeared in July and August, with artists like Ahsan Habib and Nazmus Sadat using vivid imagery to clarify the movement's message. Musically, the rap track "Awaaz Utha" by Hannan became a protest anthem, garnering millions of views; Hannan was briefly arrested for the song, drawing condemnation from PEN America. Other popular songs included "Deshta Tomar Baper Naki" and the patriotic "Dhana Dhanya Pushpa Bhara". In 2025, the documentary Amad's Dream by Aashish Kiphayet explored the diaspora's role in the uprising.

=== Commemoration ===
The interim government established the July Shaheed Smrity Foundation, led by Muhammad Yunus, to support the families of those killed or injured. Plans were also announced to convert Ganabhaban into the "July Uprising Memorial Museum". To mark the anniversary, the government declared 5 August as July Uprising Day.

== See also ==
- Asian Spring
- Arab Spring
- 2011 Egyptian Revolution
- 2022 Sri Lankan protests
- 2025 Nepalese Gen Z protests
- People Power Revolution
- 1989 Tiananmen Square protests and massacre
- October Revolution
- Romanian revolution
- Euromaidan
