= The Bangladesh Gazette =

Gazette of the Government of Bangladesh

- Type: Official gazette
- Owner: Government of the People's Republic of Bangladesh
- Founded: August 15, 1947; 79 years ago
- Language: Bengali
- Website: The Bangladesh Gazette

The Bangladesh Gazette (Bengali: বাংলাদেশ গেজেট) is the official gazette of the Government of the People's Republic of Bangladesh published from Dhaka, Bangladesh.

== History ==
The gazette traces its origin to the Dacca gazette which was published on 15 August 1947 by the government of East Bengal. The Bangladesh Gazette was formed on 7 December 1973. It has information on corp production, government appointments, weather and birth rates etc.

== See also ==
- List of newspapers in Bangladesh
