= Timeline of the July Uprising =

2024 Mass uprising in Bangladesh

The July Uprising was a pro-democracy mass uprising against the Sheikh Hasina government in Bangladesh. The movement began as a quota reform protest shortly after the High Court Division of the Supreme Court invalidated a 2018 government circular on 5 June 2024, effectively restoring quotas. However, government law enforcement agencies and some members of the ruling party conducted widespread suppression, resulting in numerous protester deaths, an event referred to as the July massacre. The movement evolved into a full-scale uprising, ultimately leading to Resignation of Sheikh Hasina on 5 August 2024.

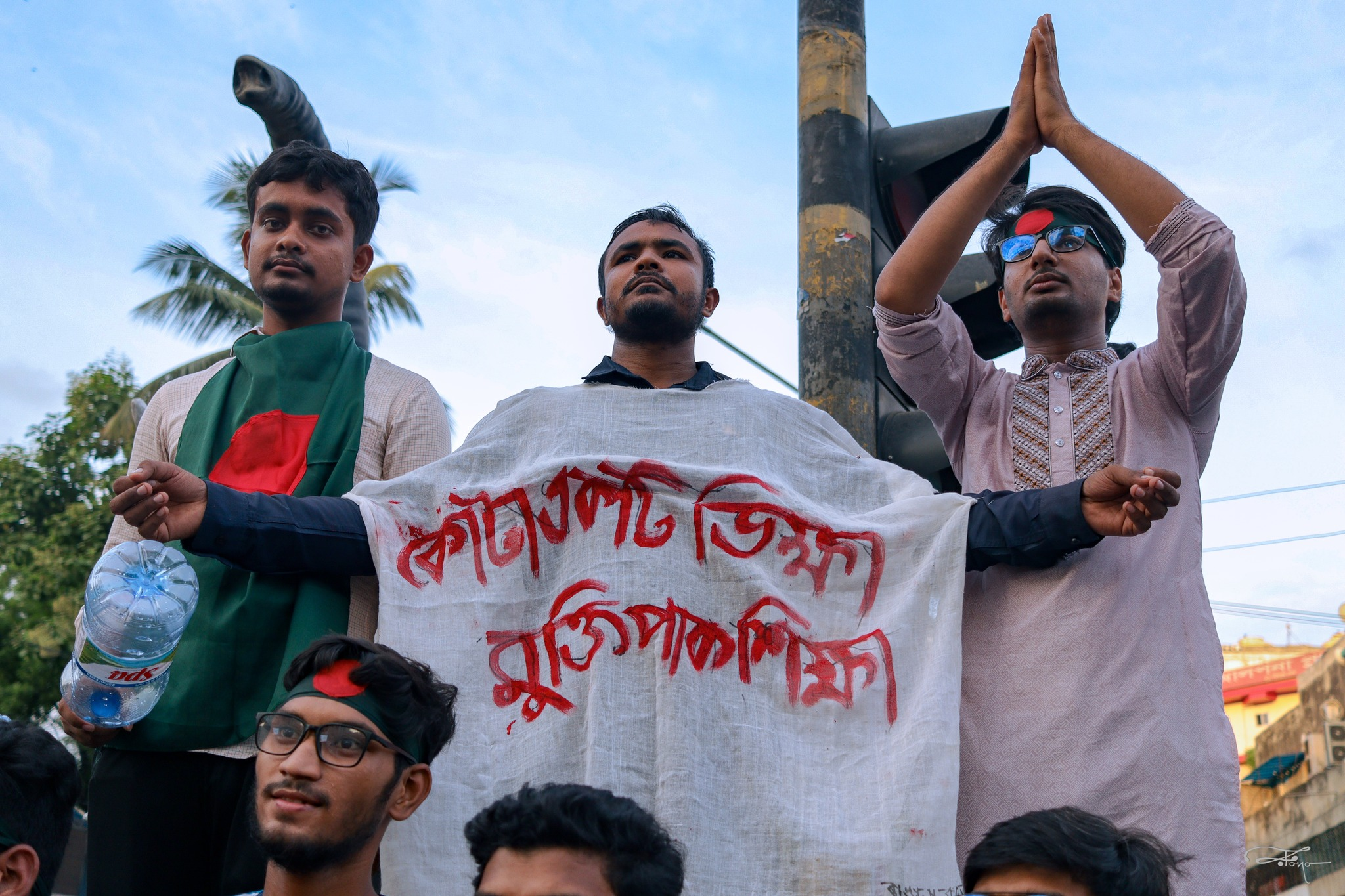
Student carrying a protest sign written "কোটা একটি ভিক্ষা; মুক্তি পাক শিক্ষা" (lit. 'Quota is an alm; education be freed')

RAB Bell 407 helicopter shooting at protesters during the protest

Quota Reform Protest in Muradpur, Chattogram

== Early phase ==
=== 5 June ===
High Court reestablished the job quota that reserves 30% of the civil service posts for the children and grandchildren of freedom fighters in the Bangladesh Liberation War.

=== 6 June ===
Six universities performed peaceful protests against the quota ruling.

The protests subsided due to the Eid al-Adha celebrations but resumed shortly after the holiday.

=== 7 July ===
Students staged a blockade, and demanded the rescinding of the quota.

== Bangla Blockade and Chhatra League attacks ==
=== 10 July ===
At the University of Dhaka, a protest march began in front of the library at approximately 11:00 AM, passed by the Anti Terrorism Raju Memorial Sculpture, and ended with a blockade of the Shahbag intersection. Members of the law and order forces positioned barricades in front of the students. In the afternoon, the Appellate Division issued a four-week stay on the High Court's ruling, which had reinstated the quota system. The Chief Justice urged the students to return to their classes. Dhaka's transport system came to a standstill due to the blockade in various parts of Dhaka. Long-distance buses and trains were stopped due to the agitation.

Police attacked protesting students of Cumilla University.

=== 11 July ===
The blockade in Shahbag was supposed to start from 03:00 PM but due to rain, the students crossed the police barricade on their way to Shahbagh and started later at 04:30 PM. Dhaka College students retreated due to police barricades and Dhaka University students joined the students of Jagannath University. Apart from Shahbag, other places in Dhaka were unaffected by the movement. At 09:00 PM, the students ended their agitation and announced a protest march and rally on 12 July to protest the violent police attack on them.

=== 12 July ===
At 05:00 PM, students gathered at Shahbag and staged a blockade in the area.

While students were protesting at Comilla Victoria College, a group of Chhatra League members launched an attack on the protesters. During the situation, a student who was recording a video was taken to a hall and beaten by the Chhatra League members.

=== 13 July ===
Students protested by blocking the railway tracks in Rajshahi. In Dhaka, DU students held a press conference in the evening, where they complained that attempts were being made to block the students' movement with lawsuits.

=== 14 July ===
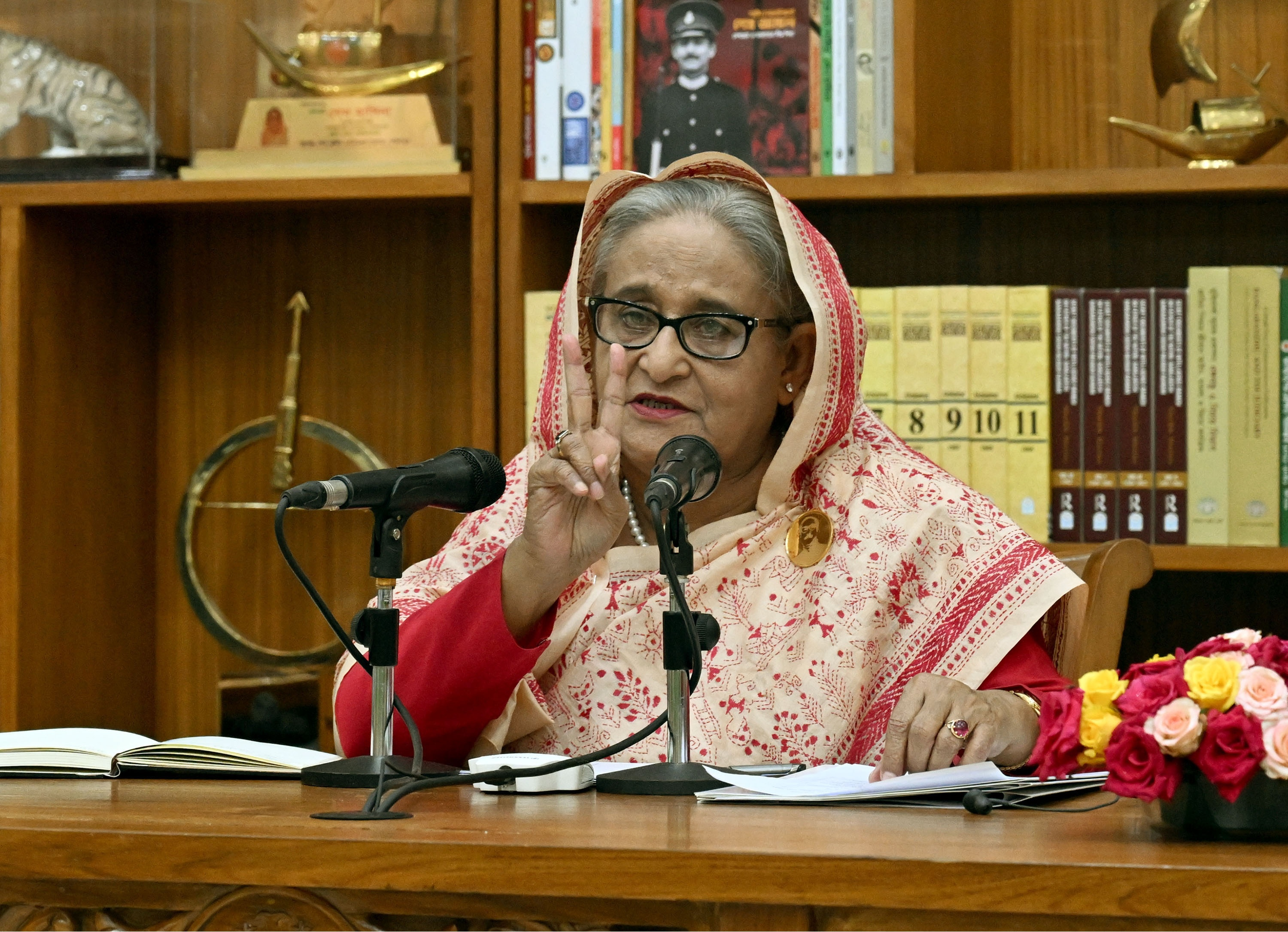
At this press conference on 14 July 2024, Sheikh Hasina linked the quota reform protesters to Razakars, drawing sharp criticism and further escalating the unrest that ultimately culminated in her resignation.

Students marched in Dhaka and held a sit-in protest and blockade, later submitting a memorandum to President Mohammed Shahabuddin.

In response to a controversial statement by Prime Minister Sheikh Hasina during a press conference in which she reportedly called quota reform protesters the children of Razakars (collaborators during the Bangladesh Liberation War), students organized a midnight demonstration on the Dhaka University campus (see Razakar remarks). Female students from Rokeya Hall joined the protest by breaking the lock put up by the authorities at the dorm gate.

The government instructed operators to shut down the 4G network in the University of Dhaka area. At around 11:30 PM, leaders and members of the Chhatra League attacked protesters at the University of Chittagong injuring 13 protesters.

=== 15 July ===
The attacks against the protesters began soon after the ruling Awami League general secretary said on Monday that the Bangladesh Chhatra League, the student wing of the ruling party, was ready to give a fitting reply to quota protesters for their 'arrogant behaviour.'

In Jashore at around 12:00 pm, students from Jashore University of Science and Technology and Michael Madhusudan College staged a protest, where a member of the Chhatra League attacked and injured a protester.

In Dhaka, Members of the Chhatra League started their procession to Shahbag from Segunbagicha near Department of Fisheries (Bangladesh) at around 03:45 PM.

Later in the evening, Chhatra League members attacked students inside Bijoy Ekattor Hall of Dhaka University, where some of the attackers were seen shooting with pistols and carrying sticks. In response, the protesters also threw brickbats from the inside of the hall to retaliate. While covering the protest in the University of Dhaka, two journalists from The Daily Star and Prothom Alo were assaulted and injured in the attack carried out by the Chhatra League.

At 5:30 pm, members of the Chhatra League attempted to attack the emergency department of Dhaka Medical College Hospital, where over 200 students injured in the clashes were seeking treatment. After several attempts throughout the afternoon, Chhatra League members, some wearing helmets, forcibly entered DMCH around 7:30 PM and initiated an attack. Many were observed carrying rods and Chinese axes. They targeted students already injured in the quota reform movement and vandalized several ambulances parked at DMCH.

Later the same evening, an attack carried out by the Chhatra League Rajshahi branch at Rajshahi University left six students injured, including the joint convenor of the Bangladesh Students Union at RU.

In Cumilla, The Cumilla University coordinator of the Students Against Discrimination was assaulted at around 8:00 pm when eight Chhatra League members called him to check his phone and beat him.

The protesters called for nation-wide demonstrations and rallies in all educational institutions of the country at 03:00 pm on 16 July.

=== 16 July ===
At around 12:15 am, members of the Chhatra League attacked Jahangirnagar University students using firearms. The students took shelter at the vice-chancellor's residence after breaking its lock. Around 300 Chhatra League members, armed with galvanised pipes and sticks, threw bricks and glass bottles at the students. Shots were reportedly fired, injuring two journalists (including one from Dhaka Tribune) and over 50 student protesters.

Police arrived to control the situation, while both groups positioned themselves outside the vice-chancellor's residence. Students claimed the attackers included outsiders, some in their forties. Later, the sub-inspector of the Ashulia Police Department blamed the students, stating that the protesters were responsible for causing 'this mayhem'.

A violent incident involving police and students demanding quota reforms took place in front of Begum Rokeya University, Rangpur between 2:30 PM and 3:00 PM. Police resorted to lathi charges and firing during the incident. According to Dr. Md. Yunus Ali, Director of Rangpur Medical College, a Begum Rokeya University student named Abu Sayed died after being brought to the hospital with gunshot wounds.

At around 3:30 PM, it was reported that in the Farmgate–Khamarbari area, Chhatra League assailants attacked protestors with sticks. When the protestors took shelter in the Farmgate metro station, the assailants entered and started to beat the students, which was witnessed by the passengers. Police were allegedly deployed to control the situation. However, DMTCL, the authority responsible for the operation for the Dhaka Metro Rail, denied these claims and stated that guards of the station drove the "miscreants" away as they entered with bamboo sticks. They also stated that there was no damage to the station. However, they announced plans to close some of the gates of the station complex for some time to prevent the recurrence of such incidents.

As students at public universities were forcefully vacated, students from various schools, colleges, and private universities joined the cause. They protested and blocked roads against the violence of the Chhatra League in the quota reform movement. (Note: Notre Dame College, Dhaka, Dhaka Residential Model College, RAJUK Uttara Model College, Adamjee Cantonment College, Viqarunnisa Noon School and College, Ideal School and College, Ideal College, Dhaka City College, BAF Shaheen College Dhaka, BAF Shaheen College Kurmitola, Birshrestha Noor Mohammad Public College, Birshrestha Munshi Abdur Rauf Public College, Primeasia University, United International University, BRAC University, University of Liberal Arts Bangladesh, Ahsanullah University of Science and Technology, Dania College, Dr. Mahbubur Rahman Mollah College, State University of Bangladesh, Enam Medical College and Hospital, Bangladesh University of Business and Technology, Daffodil International University, North South University, American International University Bangladesh, Independent University, Bangladesh, Eastern University, City University, East West University, Southeast University, International University of Business Agriculture and Technology, BGMEA University of Fashion & Technology, Manarat International University, Dhaka International University)

Students of North South University, Independent University Bangladesh and BRAC University protested at and around their respective premises areas at Bashundhara Residential Area and Merul Badda with the blockade set up by the students extending up to Baridhara, the streets in front of the Jamuna Future Park mall, the largest mall in the country, Notun Bazar, Badda, and Kuril, causing gridlock to its neighboring areas as well, including Rampura, Banasree, Badda Link Road and Abul Hotel area in Malibagh.

Students of University of Scholars, Primeasia University and Fareast International University blocked the Banani area. Students of Notre Dame College, Dhaka protested in the country's main financial hub and the largest central business district of Motijheel at Shapla Square. Students of Daffodil International University also made an attempt to start a demonstration at the road, but instead protested on-campus. Students of other universities and colleges also joined the protests. Protests also took place in Dhanmondi, specifically in front of the Science Laboratory area and in Uttara. Gridlocks were also experienced at places like Mohammadpur, Dhanmondi, Mirpur Road, and Gabtoli.

Students blocked railway lines in Chattogram and Mohakhali. The Dhaka–Chattogram, Dhaka–Khulna, Dhaka-Rajshahi, Dhaka–Rangpur and Dhaka-Mymensingh highways were also blocked.

In the evening, the Ministry of Education announced the indefinite closure of schools and colleges and the postponing of the HSC exam scheduled for 18 July.

The UGC declared that all public and private universities across the country will remain closed until further notice. At the same time, all affiliated medical, textile, engineering and other colleges will also remain closed. The commission also directed university authorities to vacate residential halls allegedly considering safety of the students.

In remembrance of the fallen, the movement announced a symbolic funeral prayer scheduled for 17 July.

=== 17 July ===
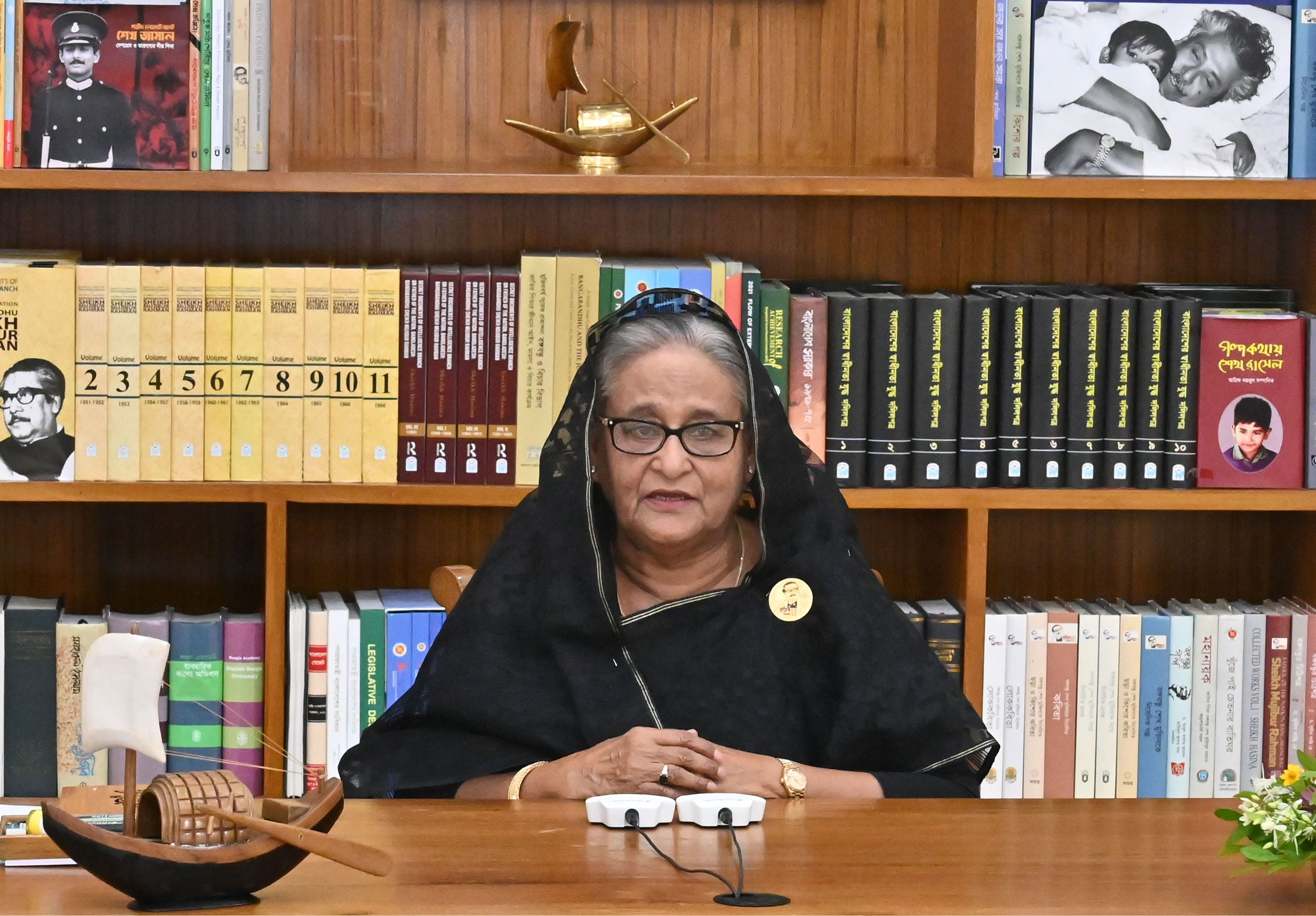
PM Sheikh Hasina addressed the nation

Clashes erupted with police after the funeral prayer program organized by the student protesters, BNP and other parties to honor six individuals killed on 16 July for the quota reform movement.

The government ordered all students to vacate the residential halls. The protestors rejected the order, to which the authorities deployed police to evacuate the halls. Students who blocked the Dhaka–Bhanga Expressway announced a total shutdown for 18 July, allowing only emergency services, to protest police violence, demand justice for the deceased, and call for a terror-free campus.

Prime Minister Sheikh Hasina addressed the nation at 7:30 pm, where she announced a judicial probe into the deaths during the anti-quota protests and urged patience until the Supreme Court delivers its verdict, emphasizing justice for the students and condemning the violence.

Students at the university erected the Shaheed Smriti Stambha, a memorial pillar to honor the memory of the dead students.

== Complete Shutdown ==
=== 18 July ===
In the morning police clashed with BRAC University students on the streets of Badda. Police also used batons and fired tear gas canisters at the students, while lobbing tear gas shells at the BRACU campus. Dhaka Metro Mirpur-10 station was closed for arson at a foot-overbridge just beneath it. Reports indicated that approximately 30 students were killed by the Bangladesh police.

Minister of Law Anisul Haque urged the students to withdraw their movement. (Note: Subsequently, the protester students stormed the headquarters of the state-owned television network, Bangladesh Television, and committed an arson attack. The network halted its transmissions following the attack.)

The Bangladesh Police, Rapid Action Battalion, Bangladesh Bank, Prime Minister Office and Chhatra League's official website was hacked by a pro-protester group as a response to the violence and attacks carried out by the police and the Chhatra League.

Metro rail services in the capital were suspended, and at around 9 pm, the government shut down internet access across the entire country.

A second-year student from the Department of Chemical Engineering and Polymer Science at Shahjalal University of Science and Technology drowned while attempting to cross a canal with friends. The incident occurred during a police chase amid clashes between students, police and Chhatra League members.

=== 19 July ===
The Dhaka Metropolitan Police, in an attempt to hinder the students' protests, announced the indefinite suspension of public gatherings and processions. The Bangladesh Railway authorities, on orders from higher-ups in the government, directed train services between Dhaka and the rest of the country to shut down to prevent quota reform protestors from using trains to travel or form gatherings, according to several unnamed railway supervisors speaking with Prothom Alo. The nationwide shutdown of internet access, which had begun on 18 July, continued into 19 July.

Avatar of Cloudflare Radar

Cloudflare Radar
(@CloudflareRadar)
tweeted:

English:

Bangladesh is experiencing a near complete #Internet outage after a government-ordered shutdown of mobile networks. Traffic and announced address space dropped to near-zero around 15:00 UTC (21:00 local).

19 July 2024

Throughout the country, calls for quota reform protests largely continued. Around 10:00 a.m., teachers at Rajshahi University of Engineering & Technology wore black face coverings in protest. At approximately 12:45 p.m., after protesters in Kishoreganj District's Bhairab Thana surrounded the police station, police fired into the crowd from within the station, injuring over a hundred students.

Some clashes with the police also took place elsewhere, including in Uttara, Mohammadpur, and Badda thanas of Dhaka. The Mirpur 10 and Kazipara metro stations were vandalised, causing extensive damages worth ৳500 crore (US$41 million).

In Narsingdi, quota reform protesters stormed a prison and released hundreds of inmates before setting the facility on fire.

The government imposed a curfew at midnight and deployed troops nationwide.

== Negotiations and Supreme Court verdict ==
After the deadly Shutdown, the Students Against Discrimination and the government started negotiations on 19 July night. At midnight, a meeting took place between three government representatives and three representatives of the protesters: Sarjis Alam, Hasnat Abdullah, and Tanvir Ahmed.

During the negotiations, at midnight of 20 July, Nahid Islam, a quota reform movement coordinator, was allegedly taken from a friend's house in Nandipara, according to his father. After being released on 21 July, Nahid Islam reported being blindfolded, handcuffed, and tortured before regaining consciousness in Purbachal.

On 21 July, the Appellate Division, Supreme Court of Bangladesh finally reduced the percentage of quotas from 56% to 7%.

== Suspensions ==
Following the verdict on 21 July, the Students Against Discrimination announced a two-day suspension of protests. They demanded that the government lift the curfew, restore internet access, and cease targeting student protesters. With the suspension of the protests by the Students Against Discrimination, no further violence was reported by this period. The organization later further extended the suspension. But mass detentions were continued by the law enforcement agencies.

On 26 July, police detained three coordinators of the Students Against Discrimination from the hospital, namely Nahid Islam, Abu Bakar Mazumdar and Asif Mahmud. The Home Minister claimed their detention to be for their own security and investigation purposes. The following day, two more coordinators of the organization, Sarjis Alam and Hasnat Abdullah, were detained. The Additional Deputy Commissioner of the Detective Branch Junaed Alam Sarker stated that they were detained for interrogation about their alleged connection with the opposition Jamaat-e-Islami and the Gono Odhikar Parishad Member-Secretary Nurul Haq Nur. In response, the organization threatened to resume their protests from 29 July if the coordinators were not released, while also demanding action against ministers and police officers over the deaths of the protesters.

Meanwhile, the government relaxed the curfew restrictions, allowing banks, factories and offices to reopen gradually.

On 23 July, the ICT Minister announced that the government would restore broadband internet service partially to banks, business organizations, export sectors, and selected areas after a five-day disruption. Accordingly, on 24 July, broadband internet services were restored, and on 28 July, mobile internet was restored in Bangladesh, although social media websites like Facebook, Instagram and TikTok continued to be blocked.

On 28 July, six protest coordinators of the Students Against Discrimination, who had been taken into custody by the Detective Branch, issued a statement from the DB office announcing the withdrawal of the protests. However, other coordinators of the same organisation alleged that these individuals had been coerced by the DB into making the statement. The remaining coordinators vowed to continue their protest, with or without the support of the six coordinators in custody.

== Resumption ==
Police arresting protestors from ECB Chattwar, Dhaka Cantonment

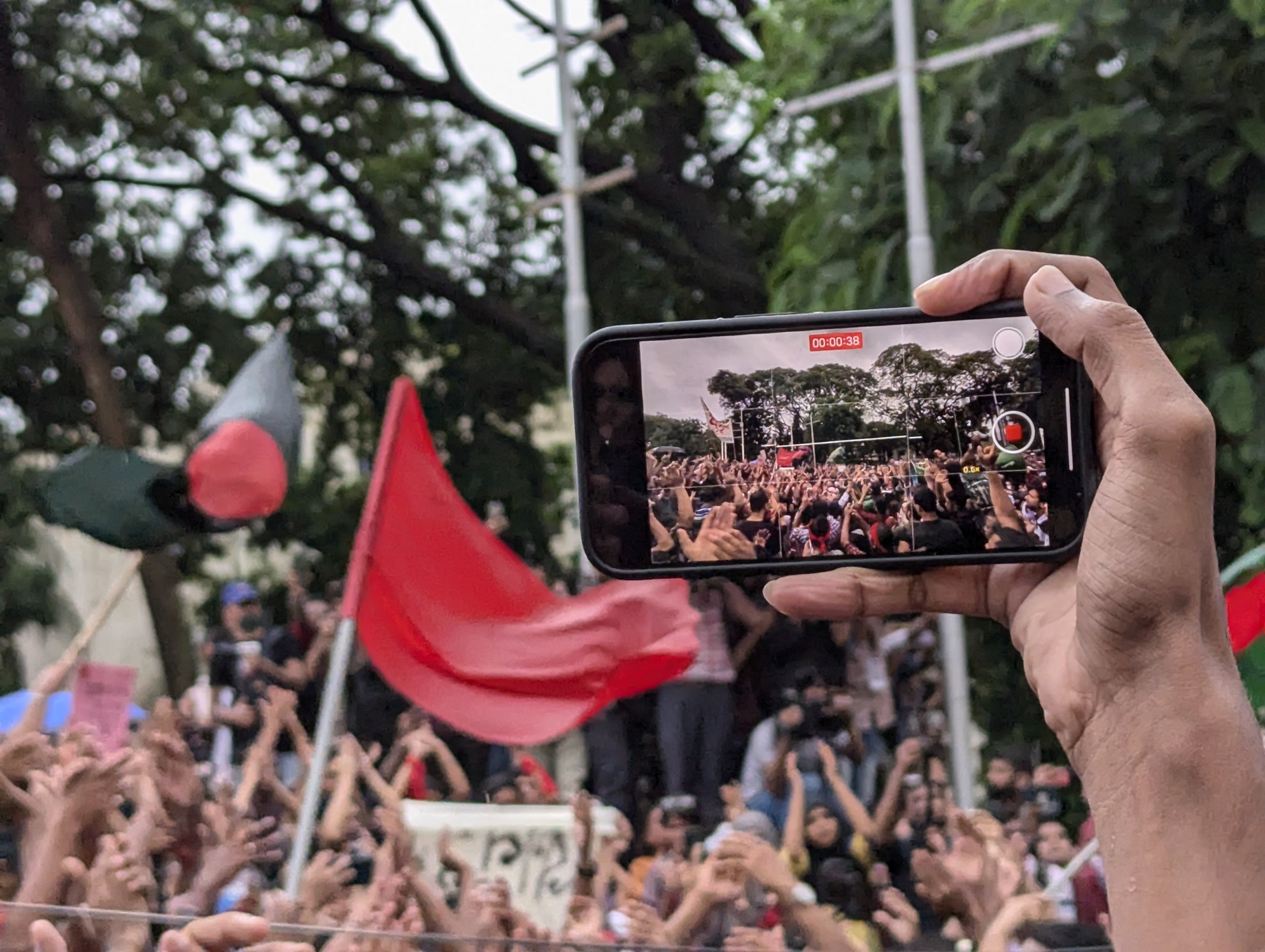
Protesters at Shaheed Minar, Dhaka during "Remembering the Heroes" march

=== 29 July ===
Protesters resumed large-scale demonstrations across various regions of the country after the government ignored an ultimatum to release their leaders. Police arrested 2,822 students in Dhaka.

University professors across Bangladesh, under the "Anti-Repression Teachers Rally" banner, have called for an end to student harassment and mass arrests. They demanded the release of detained students and expressed solidarity with ongoing student protests. The rally, held at Dhaka University's Aparajeyo Bangla on 29 July 2024, began with a moment of silence for students killed in the recent quota reform movement, which the teachers labeled the "July massacre".

=== 30 July ===
A cabinet meeting chaired by Prime Minister Sheikh Hasina on 29 July declared that nationwide mourning will be observed on 30 July to honor those killed during the quota reform movement. While Awami League leaders posted black profile pictures on Facebook, many users in Bangladesh chose red, rejecting the official mourning as a farce and declaring they will mourn only when justice is served for the dead students.

At a press conference held at the Dhaka Reporters Unity, several prominent citizens, including Iftekharuzzaman, executive director of Transparency International Bangladesh; Rizwana Hasan, Chief Executive of the Bangladesh Environmental Lawyers Association (BELA); and Asif Nazrul, Professor of Law at University of Dhaka, issued a 24-hour ultimatum for the unconditional release of the six coordinators of the Students Against Discrimination who was in Detective Branch (DB) custody.

=== 31 July ===
On 31 July, the Students Against Discrimination organized a nationwide protest named "March for Justice" in response to the series of killings, mass arrests, attacks, lawsuits, enforced disappearances, and murders of students and citizens. Abdul Hannan Masud, one of the coordinators of the movement, confirmed the event. The protest was scheduled to take place at 12:00 pm (UTC+06:00) across court premises, campuses, and streets nationwide, advocating for nine specific demands of the students. The movement sought the support and cooperation of teachers, lawyers, human rights activists, professionals, workers, and citizens.

At 11:20 am, students from Shahjalal University of Science and Technology (SUST) and other educational institutions in Sylhet marched from the university gate towards Court Point in support of the protest.

By 11:00 am, protesters began assembling at the Chattogram Court premises. Despite police barricades, around 200 protesters entered the premises and staged a sit-in. A group of 50 to 60 pro-BNP lawyers stood in solidarity with the students, while pro-Awami League lawyers conducted a counter-march. The protest in Chattogram concluded around 15:15 with a march from the court premises to the New Market intersection.

Around 13:15 pm, students from BUET, the University of Dhaka, and several other universities marched towards the High Court. Their progress was halted by the police near the Bangladesh Shishu Academy, resulting in the detention of several students. In response, the students gathered at Doel Square, later joined by teachers from Dhaka University's White Panel. The protest in Dhaka ended around 15:00 pm after nearly three hours of demonstration.

From 12:20 pm to 13:00 pm, University of Rajshahi students blocked the Dhaka-Rajshahi Highway as part of the protest. Police detained five students from the university during the demonstration.

At 15:00 pm, after being shut down for 13 days, Facebook, WhatsApp and other social media platforms were reopened.

=== 1 August ===
In memory of those killed, injured, and tortured by police during the 2024 quota reform movement, the Students Against Discrimination announced a nationwide program titled "Remembering the Heroes" in 1 August. This announcement was made in a press release signed by Rifat Rashid, one of the coordinators of the Students Against Discrimination, on 31 July. Additionally, he called for online and offline campaigns in support of the movement and in memory of the martyrs, using the hashtags "#July Massacre" and "#RememberingOurHeroes" on social media platforms.

At 12:30 PM, teachers and students of Jahangirnagar University held a protest song rally and cultural gathering to protest the attacks on Dhaka University teachers, the mass arrests of protesting students and citizens, and the harassment through false cases. In solidarity with the movement, twelve teachers from the Daffodil International University also participated in the JU event.

After the 24-hour ultimatum for the unconditional release of the six coordinators of the quota reform movement expired, several prominent citizens, including Iftekharuzzaman, Syeda Rizwana Hasan, and Asif Nazrul, announced that they would go to the DB office on the afternoon of 1 August.

The government banned the Bangladesh Jamaat-e-Islami, its student wing, the Bangladesh Islami Chhatra Shibir and its associated bodies citing anti-terrorism law following their involvement in the protests. Until 1 August, 274 cases had been filed against students in various police stations in Dhaka Metropolitan. In these cases, up to the morning of 1 August, 3,011 students were arrested by the Dhaka Metropolitan Police.

The police released six coordinator from Detective Branch (DB) custody as the government looked to calm tensions and forestall fresh demonstrations. Upon being released from the DB office, several coordinators announced that they would continue the movement and shared their statements on social media.

In Narayanganj, the Candlelight Vigil program organized in support of "Remembering the Heroes" was disrupted by police intervention. During this time, the police baton-charged the students resulting in injuries at least ten.

=== 2 August ===
Protesters in Rangpur chanting "ছি ছি হাসিনা, লজ্জায় বাঁচিনা" (transl. Shame shame Hasina, we can't live out of shame)

The protesters sought justice for victims affected by the unrest and police crackdown following the release of student leaders. This release did not alleviate public anger, leading to renewed protests. Demonstrators demanded the reopening of schools and universities across the country and, called for Sheikh Hasina's resignation. Clashes occurred as police fired rubber bullets, tear gas shells, and sound grenades in several locations, including Uttara, Khulna, Sylhet, and Habiganj. One police officer was beaten to death by protesters in Khulna, while one civilian died in Habiganj.

Due to the renewed unrest, internet service providers again restricted access to Facebook, WhatsApp, and Telegram. After five hours of restriction, access to Facebook and Messenger were reopened; however Telegram remained restricted.

On the same day, the six coordinators, previously detained by the Detective Branch, claimed they were coerced into issuing a retraction of their support for the movement, alleging that the statement was obtained under duress for national broadcast.

Following the ongoing violence and sabotage incidents centered around the quota reform movement, 78 HSC candidates arrested in related cases have been granted bail from various courts across the country. Among them, 55 are from the Dhaka division, 14 from the Chittagong division, 6 from the Khulna division, and 3 from the Rangpur division.

The United Nations agency for children and culture, UNICEF, has expressed concern over the deaths of at least 32 children during the protest crackdown surrounding the 2024 Quota Reform Movement in Bangladesh in July. Sanjay Wijesekera, UNICEF Regional Director for South Asia, has urged swift measures to ensure the children can return to school.

=== 3 August ===
In the early hours of the day, an injured person passed away while receiving treatment.

Sheikh Hasina proposed peaceful talks with the protesters, saying,

The doors of Ganabhaban are open. I want to sit with the quota protesters and listen to them. I do not want conflict.

— Sheikh Hasina

However, in the afternoon, coordinator Nahid Islam announced that they had no plans to negotiate with the government. He stated:

When we were in Detective Branch custody, we were offered to sit in talks with the Prime Minister. But we protested against this proposal by going on a hunger strike in DB custody.

— Nahid Islam

Asif Mahmud, a coordinator of the Students Against Discrimination, commented:

We have no plans to negotiate with them. Our demands are very clear. If they have any statements, they can present them to the nation through the media. The decision of the protesting students and people is our decision. There is no dialogue with bullets and terrorism.

— Asif Mahmud

At the program, freedom fighter Md. Sharif Hossain said,

Seeing the justified demands of the students, I could not stay at home. We freedom fighters are with you and will always be with you. At this time, all freedom fighters should take to the streets.

— Md. Sharif Hossain

Around 10:30 AM on Saturday, students from various educational institutions in Rajshahi marched and gathered in front of the Rajshahi University of Engineering and Technology, chanting slogans. The students took to the streets with a single demand: the resignation of the Prime Minister.

Students and ordinary people gathered at the Shaheed Minar, Dhaka area with protest marches from different parts of the capital, At around 5:30 PM, Nahid Islam, one of the coordinator, addressed the assembled crowd at Shaheed Minar. where the Students Against Discrimination announced a single demand for the resignation of Prime Minister Sheikh Hasina and her cabinet and called for a comprehensive Non-cooperation movement (2024) from 4 August, which marked the end of the quota protests.

The court has granted bail to Arif Sohel, a coordinator of the Students Against Discrimination, but he has not been released yet.

In Chittagong, there was an attack on the residence of Education Minister Mohibul Hasan Chowdhury. During this incident, two cars parked in front of the house were vandalized, and one of them was set on fire. Earlier, around 5:30 PM, there was also an attack on the office of Md Mohiuddin Bacchu, the Member of Parliament for Chittagong-10, located in the Lalkhan Bazar. The office was set on fire during the attack. In another incident in Sreepur, Gazipur one person was killed during clashes between police and protesting students.

In Rangpur, two police officers have been temporarily suspended in connection with the death of Abu Sayed, a student at Begum Rokeya University, Rangpur and a key coordinator of the quota reform movement. The two officers are ASI Amir Hossain of Rangpur Police Lines and Constable Sujan Chandra Roy of Tajhat Police Station.

During an Students Against Discrimination in Sylhet, clashes occurred between the police and the students along with the public. Initial reports indicate that over a hundred people were injured in the conflict.

At around 1:30 PM in Race Course, Comilla, leaders and activists of the Chhatra League, Jubo League, and Swechchhasebak League attacked a mass rally of Students Against Discrimination protesters. During the attack, they fired openly at the students, resulting in 10 students being shot and a total of 30 people being injured.

In Bogra, there were repeated clashes between protesting students and the police. From 4 PM to around 6 PM, these confrontations lasted nearly two hours. During the conflict, the police fired tear gas shells, sound grenades, rubber bullets, and shotgun rounds. Several areas of the city, including Satmatha, Circuit House Mor, Romena Afaz Road, Kalibari Mor, Bir Muktijoddha Rezaul Baki Road, and Jailkhana Mor, turned into battlegrounds. At least six students were shot, and an additional fifty students were injured.

== Non-cooperation movement ==
=== 4 August ===
The day became the deadliest of the protests with around 91 people killed, including 14 police officers. Clashes erupted between protesters and police while protesters blocked major highways. Police stations, as well as Awami League offices, were targeted by protesters. Police forces shot tear gas and claimed to have fired rubber bullets although some people were injured and killed by actual bullets. The renewed demonstrations led the government to shut down internet and to declare an indefinite nationwide curfew stating from 6 p.m.

Hasina criticised the protesting students saying that those who engage in "sabotage" and destruction were no longer students but terrorists, while the protesters called for her to resign.

=== 5 August ===
Prime Minister Sheikh Hasina resigned and fled the country to India, "for her own safety" according to her son, Sajeeb Wazed.

During a televised address to the nation, Chief of the Army Staff General Waker-uz-Zaman announced the Resignation of Sheikh Hasina and that an interim government would be formed following talks with major political parties other than the Awami League, the former prime minister's party.

== See also ==
- Withdrawal of Joe Biden from the 2024 United States presidential election
