= July Shaheed Smrity Foundation =

Welfare organisation in Bangladesh

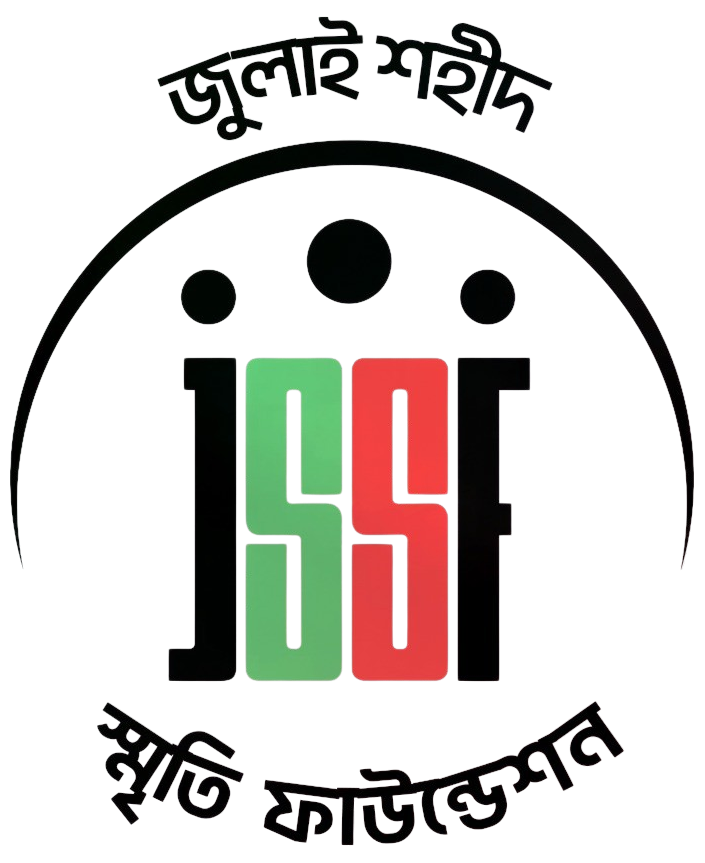
- Formation: 10 September 2024; 2 years ago
- Founded at: House 35, Road 9/D, Sector 5, Uttara, Dhaka, Bangladesh
- Headquarters: BSL Office complex, Building 2, 3rd floor, 119 Kazi Nazrul Islam Avenue, Ramna, Dhaka.
- President: Lieutenant Colonel (retired) Kamal Akbar
- Chief Executive: Lieutenant Colonel (retired) Kamal Akbar
- Secretary General: Shamsi Ara Zaman
- Website: www.jssfbd.com

July Shaheed Smrity Foundation (Bengali: জুলাই শহীদ স্মৃতি ফাউন্ডেশন, lit. 'July Martyrs Memorial Foundation') is an organisation founded in memoriam of the deceased protesters of the July massacre. On 10 September 2024, Department of Social Services of the Government of Bangladesh approved the executive council of the organisation. The structural function of the organisation is to provide financial assistance and long-term support, including mental health and counselling needs, to the families of those killed and injured in the massacre.

== History ==
The interim government led by Muhammad Yunus took the initiative to establish a memorial foundation after taking responsibility to preserve the memory of those killed and to provide help to the families effected by the July massacre. On 10 September 2024, the organisation formed a seven-member executive council, appointing Muhammad Yunus as President and Mir Mahbubur Rahman Snigdho as General Secretary. Snigdho is the twin brother of Mir Mahfuzur Rahman Mugdho, who was killed during the quota reform movement. Later Snigdho was elevated to Chief Executive (CEO) and Sarjis Alam, a key coordinator of Students Against Discrimination, was appointed as the general secretary.

== See also ==
- List of people who died in the July massacre
