= Mir Mugdho =

Bangladeshi student activist (1998–2024)

- মীর মুগ্ধ
- Mugdho in 2024
- Born: Mir Mahfuzur Rahman Mugdho; 9 October 1998; Uttara, Dhaka, Bangladesh
- Died: 18 July 2024 (aged 25); Azampur, Dhaka, Bangladesh
- Resting place: Kamarpara Bamnartek Graveyard, Sector 10, Uttara, Dhaka
- Other name: Mugdho
- Education: Khulna University; Bangladesh University of Professionals
- Occupations: Student activist, freelancer
- Known for: Among the first to die in the July massacre
- Movement: July Uprising: 2024 Bangladesh quota reform movement

Mir Mahfuzur Rahman Mugdho (Bengali: মীর মাহফুজুর রহমান মুগ্ধ; 9 October 1998 – 18 July 2024) was a Bangladeshi student activist and freelancer in the 2024 quota reform movement, who was shot dead while distributing food, water and biscuits during the protest. His death is widely recognised as a pivotal point in the July Uprising.

== Personal life ==
Mugdho was born on 9 October 1998 in Uttara, Dhaka, Bangladesh, one minute after his twin brother Mir Mahbubur Rahman Snigdho. He had an elder brother, Mir Dipto. He belonged to a Bengali family of Muslim Mirs hailing from Ramrail in Brahmanbaria. His father, Mir Mustafizur Rahman, was a health inspector. As a child, he was a Bangladesh Scout. He played football and was planning a trip around Bangladesh at the time of his death.

Mugdho obtained his bachelor's degree in mathematics from Khulna University in 2023. After that, he began his MBA at Bangladesh University of Professionals (BUP), in Dhaka city. He was a freelancer, earning about $2,000-3,000 a month.

== Quota reform movement and death ==
On 18 July 2024, Mugdho set out to distribute food and water to the protestors. His twin brother Snigdho was planning to come with him, but Mugdho asked him not to. He began distributing food and water at 4 pm. In a video recorded fifteen minutes before his death, he is seen distributing water bottles and boxes of biscuits to protestors. According to eyewitnesses, he kept moving towards injured or exhausted students to give them water. Around 5 pm, when he was at the side of the road, he was shot at Azampur intersection in Uttara. The bullet entered through his forehead and exited through the right side of his head. His body was taken to Uttara Crescent Hospital where he was pronounced dead on arrival.

Snighdo was the first of Mugdho's family to learn of Mugdho's death and to see his brother's body. The rest of his family, who were in Cox's Bazar on holiday, learned of their son's death on next day morning.

== Legacy ==
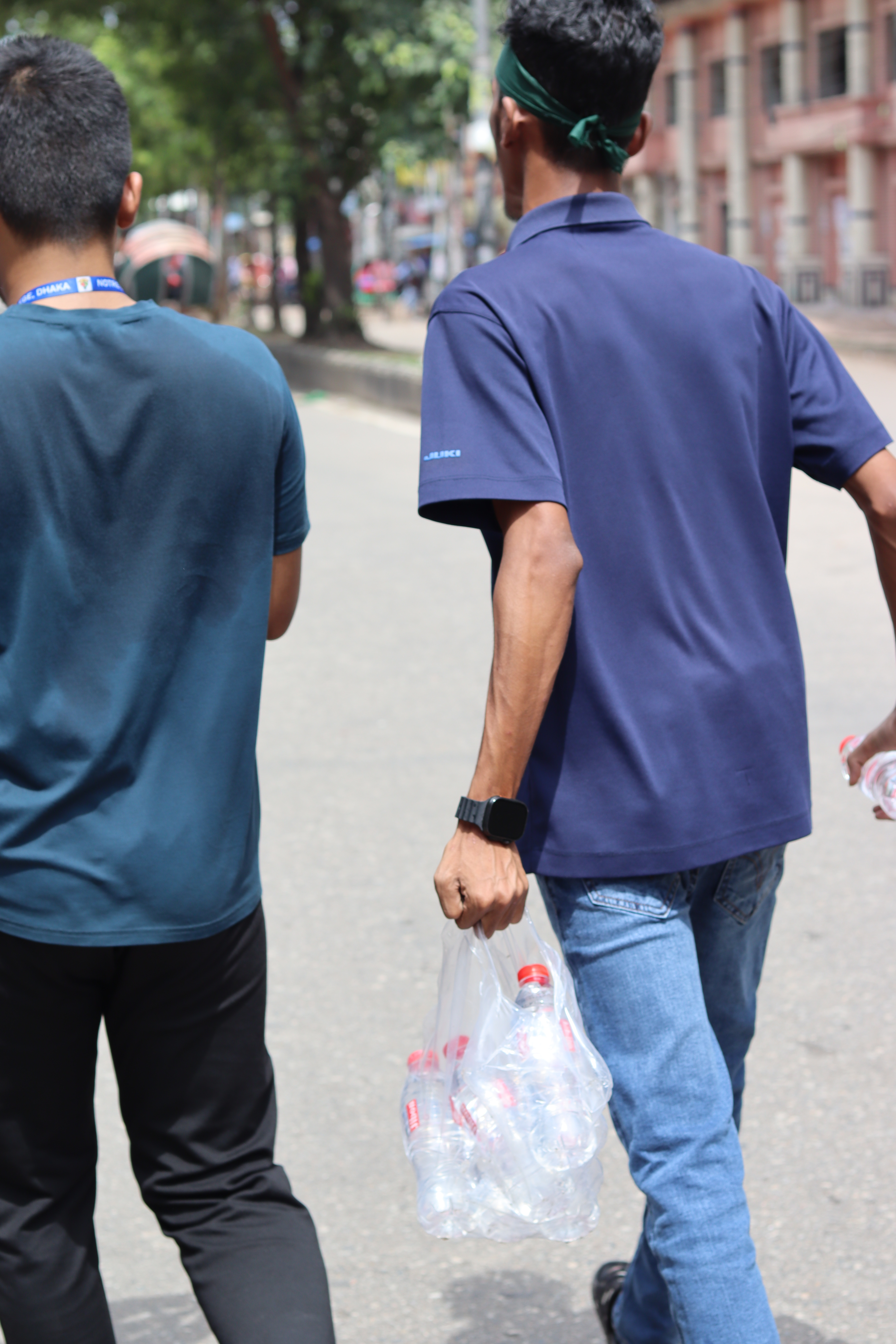
A protester in the non-cooperation movement carrying free water for the protesters in remembrance of Mugdho

Mugdho's death is considered one of the most notable deaths that occurred during the July Uprising and created much discussion in social and political circles. His death was seen as a symbolic event in the uprising that became a symbol among the agitators. Soon after his death, the video of him distributing water and biscuits, posted by his twin brother, went viral on social media.

Freelance marketplace Fiverr offered its condolences on Facebook for his death. The Minister of Education Mohibul Hasan Chowdhury also visited the home of Mugdho's family to give condolences following his death.

=== "Water Needed, Water" ===
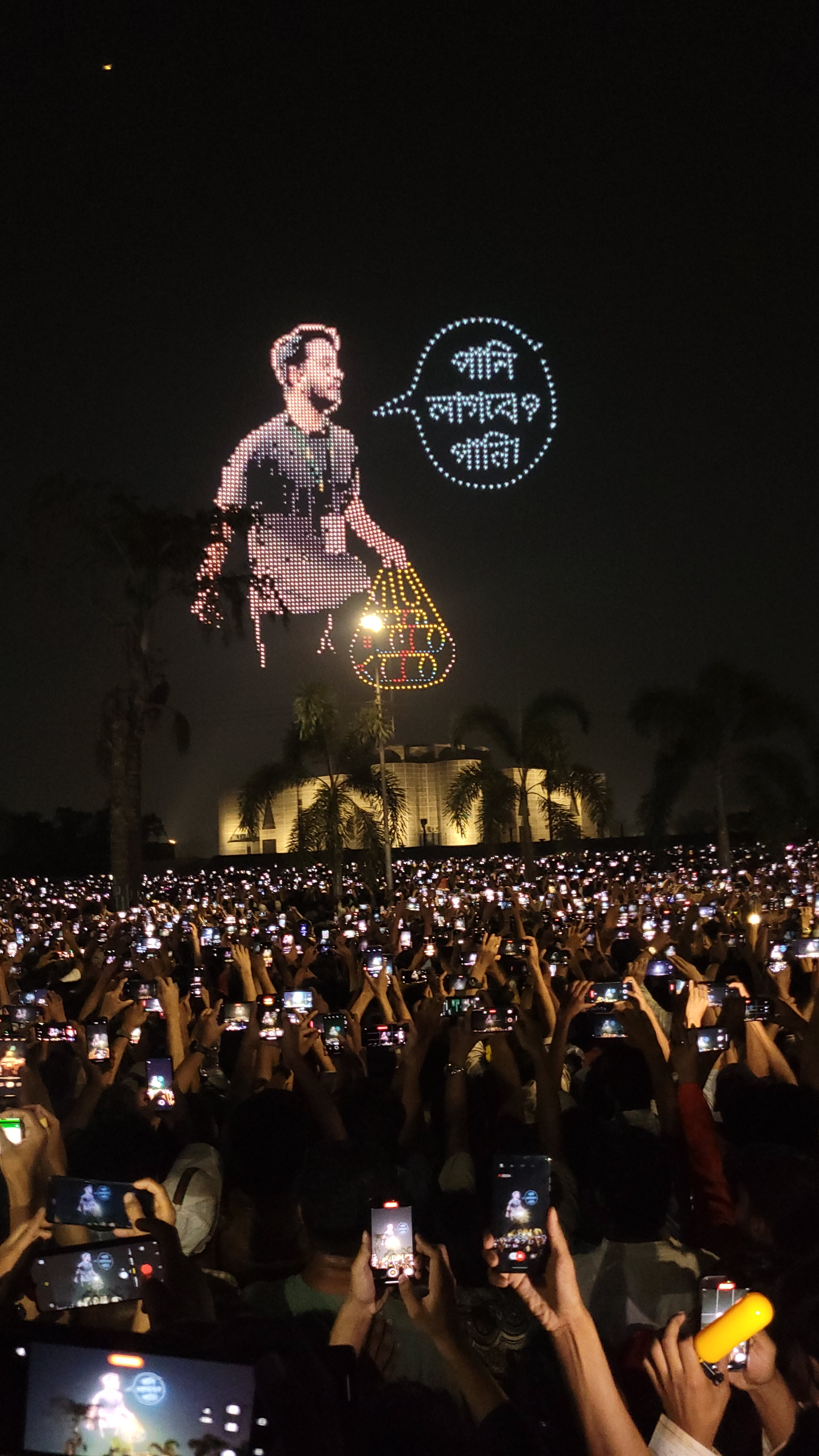
A portrait of Mir Mugdho displayed during a drone show held at Manik Mia Avenue in Dhaka.

"Water needed, water" (Bengali: পানি লাগবে পানি) was a line from a viral video recorded moments before the death of Mugdho, which created a stir among protesters and became a focal point of discussion on social media. Just minutes before being shot, Mugdho was seen in a video holding a water case, distributing water among protesting students, repeatedly saying, "Does anyone need water? Water, water?" Later, the phrase "Water needed, water" became a symbolic slogan of the movement and appeared as graffiti on walls across different locations.

"Mugdho" named water bottles were also distributed in a post-revolution cartoon festival. On 14 April 2025, on the occasion of Bengali New Year, motif of a water bottle was featured in the Ananda Shobhajatra in remembrance of Mugdho, and also portrayed in the drone show held that day.

=== Namesake ===
In August 2024, Bangabandhu Mukta Mancha, located in Uttara, Dhaka, was renamed as Mugdho Mancha in his memory.

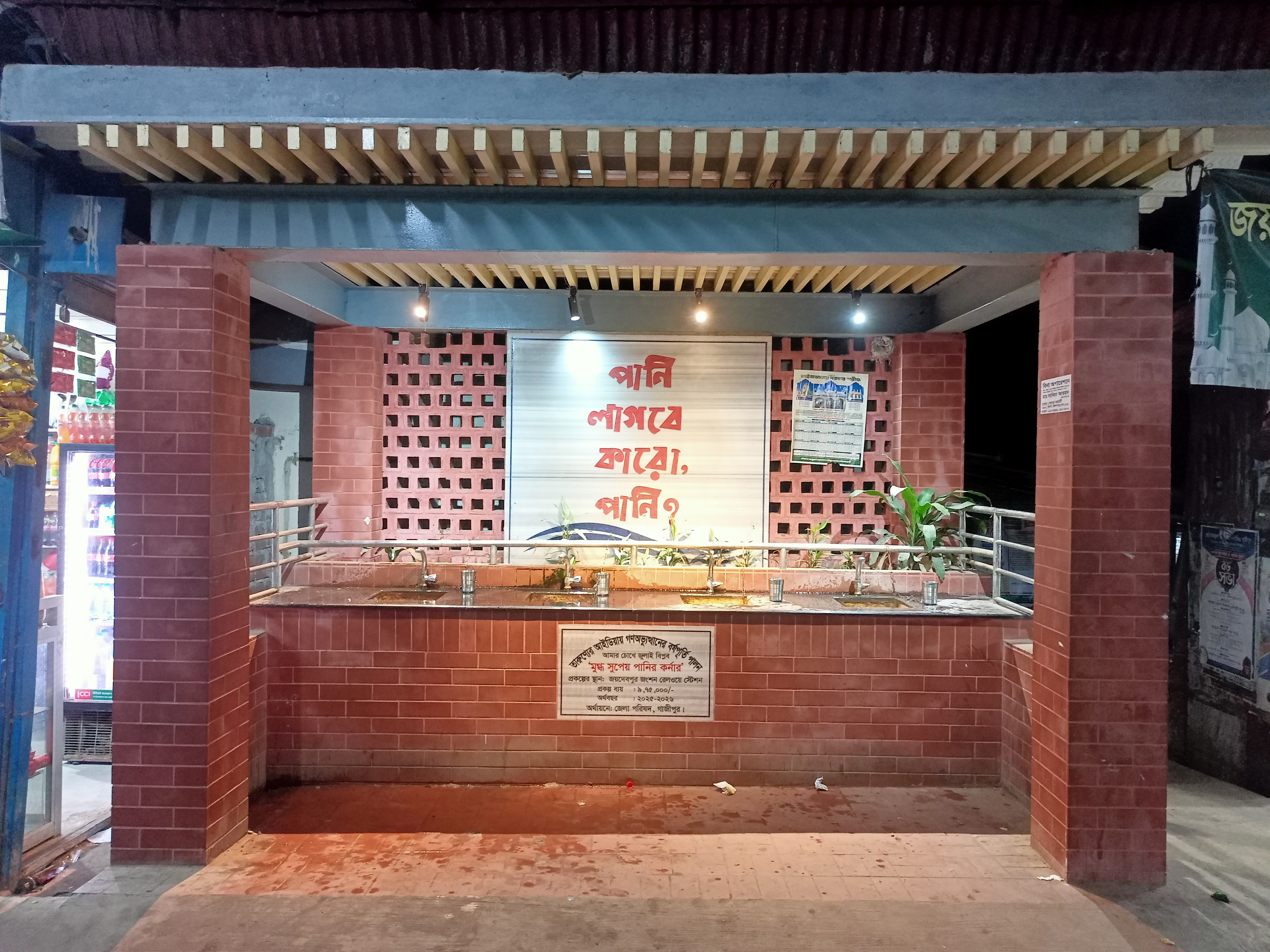
'Mugdho Safe Drinking Water Corner' at Joydebpur Junction railway station in Gazipur, Bangladesh.

=== Posthumous recognition ===
In July 2026, the Ministry of Home Affairs of Bangladesh issued a notification approving a new design for the country's passport. Under the approved design, the watermark on pages 32 and 33 is set to depict Mugdho alongside fellow July Uprising martyrs Abu Sayed and Wasim Akram, commemorating the 2024 July Uprising.

== See also ==
- July massacre
- List of people killed in Bangladesh quota reform movement
  - Abu Sayed
  - Golam Nafiz
- Timeline of Student–People's uprising
