= List of people who died in the July massacre =

The July massacre, which took place during the July Uprising in Bangladesh, resulted in significant casualties, including protesters, opposition members, and civilians. The mass killings occurred under the Sheikh Hasina government and involved law enforcement agencies like the police and Rapid Action Battalion, along with participation from the Awami League's student wing, Chhatra League; youth wing, Jubo League; and volunteer wing, Swechasebak League.

The quota reform movement aimed to reduce the quota system in government job recruitment in favour of a merit-based approach. The government's response included a crackdown that led to reports of over 266 deaths during the protests and related incidents. The high casualty figures contributed to the rise of the non-cooperation movement, which led to the resignation of Sheikh Hasina and departure from the country. A preliminary UN investigation estimated that approximately 650 people were killed in the violence between 16 July and 5 August 2024.

== List ==
=== Protesters ===
1. Abu Sayed - was a 12th batch student of the English department at Begum Rokeya University and one of the main coordinators of the university unit of the Students Against Discrimination. He was killed by a gunshot fired by police during a clash between police and the protesters.
2. Md. Wasim Akram - was a student of Chittagong College and the joint convener of the college unit of Bangladesh Jatiotabadi Chatra Dal.
3. Foysal Ahmed Shanto - was a student of Omargani M.E.S. College.
4. Mir Mahfuzur Rahman Mugdho - was a student at Bangladesh University of Professionals. He was a freelancer in the freelance marketplace Fiverr, who offered their condolences on social media following his death.
5. Tahir Zaman Priyo - was a journalist shot by police during protests at the Science Lab area of Dhaka.
6. Ridowan Sharif Riyad - was a first-year student in the English department at Tongi Government College.
7. Ruhan - died at Sir Salimullah Medical College Hospital.
8. Sajidur Rahman Omar - was a worker at a Demra-based IT firm.
9. Shahjahan - was a salesman in or near the Mohakhali area.
10. Tuhin Ahmed - was admitted to Enam Medical College and Hospital, where he died, after getting shot in a clash with police.
11. Rudra Sen - was a second-year student in the Department of Chemical Engineering and Polymer Science at Shahjalal University of Science and Technology. He drowned while trying to cross a canal with several friends in search of a safe shelter during a police chase amidst clashes between students, police, and Chhatra League activists during the quota reform movement on July 18.
12. Hridoy Chandra Taruya - was a student at Chittagong University.
13. Abdullah Siddiqui - was a student at Habibullah Bahar College and was shot in Dhaka on 4 August 2024.
14. Mahmudul Hasan Rizbi - was a student of Lakshmipur Polytechnic Institute and an activist in the Bangladesh Students Union.
15. Farhan Faiyaz Ratul - was a class 11 student of Dhaka Residential Model College and was killed during clashes with the police and the Awami League activists on 18 July 2024.
16. Shaikh Ashabul Yamin - was a student of the computer science department of the Military Institute of Science and Technology. He was shot by police on 18 July 2024 in Savar during a clash between protestors and police.
17. Rakib Hossain Rajib - was a student of textile engineering at Southeast University. He was shot by police while he was in procession in Dhaka on 5 August 2024. He was said to have been involved in the quota reform movement from the beginning.
18. Jahiduzzaman Tanvin - was an engineering graduate of Islamic University of Technology and CTO of a drone technology startup. He was shot by police while distributing toothpaste packs to protestors to protect them from tear gas. His autopsy suggested he succumbed to close-range shotgun wounds.
19. Rahul Islam - was an eleventh-grade student at Raniganj Ehya Hossain School and College. He was injured by tear gas and a gunshot fired by the police during a protest on 4 August.
20. Tahmid Abdullah - was a student at the Bangladesh University of Business and Technology.
21. Golam Nafiz - an eleventh-grade student of Noubahini College, Dhaka, was shot in the Farmgate area. The last photo of him was on 4 August or the first day of Non-cooperation movement (2024) where he was taken to the hospital by a rickshaw. He was laid on the rickshaw while some pro-government people blocked him from going to the hospital. Later, he died on the spot. A YouTube video was seen by Al Jazeera English by some journalists. They had not a lot of footages to be shown.
22. Md Shumon Mia - a madrasa student at Madhobdi in Narsingdi, was shot in his abdomen during a protest on 20 July.
23. Raihan - was a madrasa student in Patuakhali. He attended the non-cooperation movement and was shot by six bullets in Badda, Dhaka, and died afterward.
24. Adil - was a student in Narayanganj. He was shot twice in the chest by law enforcement officers on 19 July 2024.
25. Shahariar Khan Aanas - a student, was killed on 5 August. He wrote a letter saying about joining protests to his parents before his death.
26. Afiqul Islam Saad – was a student of Savar Cantonment Public School and College. He was shot in the head during a protest in Dhamrai on 5 August 2024 and died three days later on 8 August 2024 at Enam Medical College and Hospital.
27. Nasib Hasan Riyan - a student of Bangladesh Chemical Industries Corporation College. He was killed by police firing on 5 august. He was at first admitted to a private hospital but later on was carried in Shaheed Suhrawardy Medical College and Hospital where he took his last breath. He was bathed at Shyamoli Jam-e-Masjid.
28. Emon Hasan Akash - A protester who was shot and killed on August 4 in Mirpur. He was a courier service worker who participated at the uprising. He was buried at his grandfather's house in Shariatpur.
29. Asifur Rahman - A 17 year old protester who worked at a garment factory. He was killed by police firing on 19 July.
30. Akram Khan Rabbi - A protester who was attacked and killed by police and regime supporters.
31. Md. Selim Talukdar was a Student of BGMEA University of Fashion and Technology (BUFT) Department of Apparel Merchandising and Management (AMM) who was shot during the 2024 Quota Reform Movement. He died from his injuries on 31 July 2024.

=== Non-protesting civilians ===
1. Riya Gope, a six-year-old girl who was playing on her rooftop, died from a stray bullet.
2. Sumaiya Akhtar Sumi, a housewife, was shot by a stray bullet on a balcony.
3. Arafat Rahman Akash, a 16-year-old fruit seller, was killed while going out to get breakfast.
4. Selim Mondol, 29, was one of three workers who burned to death in an arson attack on a building under construction in Narayanganj which also housed a unit of the Highway Police.
5. Wahab Mandal was one of three workers who burned to death in an arson attack on a building under construction in Narayanganj.
6. Sohel, 42, was one of three workers who burned to death in an arson attack on a building under construction in Narayanganj.
7. Mustaque Miah, 24, had come to buy shoes. He got caught in the clash and was killed by police gunfire.
8. Jahangir Alam, 45, worked in making quilts and mattresses.
9. Khalid Hasan, 16, a college student, was shot dead after Asr prayers by police who were chasing a group of protestors
10. Mamun Hossain, 27, a private car driver, was shot on a flyover while heading to his aunt's house.
11. Saad Mahmud, 14, a student, was shot dead by police when he went to investigate smoke on a nearby road.
12. Maruf Hossain, 20, a grade 12 student, was passing by Badda.
13. Mostofa Zaman Samudra, 17, was shot after going out to see friends after Jumma prayer.s
14. Muhammad Faruk, 32, a furniture shop employee, was shot while crossing a road after having lunch in Chittagong.
15. Md. Saiful Islam, 35, a sharecropper, was shot while in Amuakanda Bazar in Mymensingh district to sell his crops. His grandfather died of a stroke after hearing the news.
16. Ahsan Habib, 25, an office assistant in Cox's Bazar, was shot while looking out at quota clashes from his office building.
17. Jisan Ahmed, 19, a small-time water vendor in Dhaka, was shot while peeking outside after hiding during a clash between protestors and police. His wife, Mishti, died by suicide nine days later.
18. Jihad Hossain, 25, a PG student at Kabi Nazrul Govt. College, Dhaka, was shot while going to a roadside hotel for lunch.
19. Imran Khalifa, 26, a night guard in Gulshan, was shot while heading towards a market.
20. Maruf Hossain, 21, was an IT freelancer who had just completed final exams at Kushtia Polytechnic Institute. He came to Dhaka for an internship and was shot dead in Banasree by the BGB.
21. Abdul Gani, 45, a hotel worker, was shot during a clash between police and protestors while heading to his workplace.
22. Mahmudur Rahman Soikot, 19, son of a local shopkeeper, was searching for an injured friend before being shot by police
23. Rabbi Miah, 22, was a student at Southeast University preparing for the IELTS exam to study abroad. He was shot by police when recording a clash between police and protestors from a verandah.
24. Jahangir Hossain Mridha, 51, a van driver, was shot while buying food for his family.
25. Mahmudul Hassan, 20, was an electronics graduate from Lakshmipur Polytechnic Institute at an internship in Dhaka. He was shot while returning to a mess with friends.
26. Liton Matubbar, 30, a tile mason in Dhaka, was shot while returning from work during a clash between protestors and police.
27. Firoz Talukdar Palash, 38, an office assistant at a chemical company in Dhaka, was shot while caught in a clash between police and protestors.
28. Muhammad Shahid, 45, a shopkeeper, was killed by police during police-protestor clashes.
29. Md. Nasir Hossain, a tailor, was killed by gunfire in Jatrabari, Dhaka, on 20 July.
30. Tahmid Bhuiyan Tamim, 15, a student of Nasima Kadir Molla High School and Homes, was shot when he went to see what was happening at a protest near his home.

=== Oppositions ===
1. Hamidul Islam - Gazipur Jubo League member
2. Mohinul Islam - Dhaka North Jubo League member
3. Md. Babul - Dhaka North Jubo League member
4. Ahsan Habib - Dhaka North Jubo League member
5. Mohammad Muqtadir - police officer
6. Naik Gias Uddin - police officer
7. Rana Mollah, assistant to former mayor of Gazipur, Zahangir Alam, lynched in Uttara
8. Masud Parvez Bhuiyan, police officer attacked in Banasree, died in hospital
9. Sumon Kumar Gharami, police constable, beaten to death by protestors during a clash with demonstrators in Khulna on 2 August
10. Selim Khan, expelled leader of the Awami League
11. Shanto Khan, Kolkata-based actor and producer

== See also ==
- July Shaheed Smrity Foundation
- Politics of Bangladesh
- List of massacres in Bangladesh
