= Killing of Abu Sayed =

Killing of a Bangladeshi student activist during the 2024 July Uprising

Abu Sayed
- আবু সাঈদ
- Abu Sayed during quota reform movement holding the Bangladeshi flag
- Born: c. 2001; Pirganj, Rajshahi Division, Bangladesh
- Died: 16 July 2024 (aged 24–25); Rangpur, Rangpur Division, Bangladesh
- Cause of death: Gunshot wounds
- Resting place: Pirganj, Rangpur Division, Bangladesh
- Education: Begum Rokeya University
- Organization: Students Against Discrimination
- Known for: Among the first to die in the July massacre
- Movement: 2024 Bangladesh quota reform movement

Abu Sayed (Bengali: আবু সাঈদ, romanized: Ābu Sāīd; born 10 December 2000 – 16 July 2024) was a Bangladeshi student activist who was shot dead by the police on 16 July 2024, while participating in the 2024 quota reform movement. Sayed was a student of Begum Rokeya University and was involved in the protest in front of the university when the police engaged in baton charges and opened fire on the students.

== Early life ==
Abu Sayed grew up in Babanpur village of Pirganj Upazila of Rangpur (then part of Rajshahi Division). His father is Maqbul Hossain and his mother is Monowara Begum. He was the youngest of a family of six brothers and three sisters. He won a talent pool scholarship from the local Jafor Para Government Primary School in the fifth grade. Later, he passed SSC with a GPA of 5 from Khalashpir Bilateral High School.

After completing SSC, he received a scholarship from the Babylon Group, called the Babylon Scholarship Program, to complete his college education. Then he passed HSC from Rangpur Government College with a GPA-5. Later, he was admitted to the English department at Begum Rokeya University as a member of the 12th batch of students.

== Activism ==
Abu Sayed was an activist of the quota reform movements of 2013 and 2018. After the new quota reform movement began on 6 June 2024, he became involved as the coordinator of the Students Against Discrimination at Rangpur Begum Rokeya University.

Abu Sayed published a Facebook post on 15 July 2024, referring to Mohammad Shamsuzzoha, a martyr in the 1969 East Pakistan mass uprising:

Sir! We need you desperately at this moment, sir! All your contemporaries have passed away. Yet you remain immortal even in death. Your grave is an inspiration to us. We are invigorated in your spirit

You, too, will eventually succumb to death, according to the laws of nature. But as long as you live, live with a backbone. Support just demands, take to the streets, and stand as a shield for the students. You will receive genuine honor and respect. You will not fade into the annals of time upon your death. You will live forever as a Shamsuzzoha. Dying as a 'Shamsuzzoha' is far more joyous, honorable, and glorious.

== Death ==
On 16 July, between 2:30 and 3:00 pm, quota reform protesters and police clashed in front of Begum Rokeya University. Police fired tear gas and baton-charged to disperse protesting students. Most of the students left while Abu Sayed remained. The police were firing rubber bullets from the opposite direction. Abu Sayed was subsequently shot four times by a police officer. He died before being taken to hospital at 3:05 pm (BST).

== Homages ==
Later on 28 October 2024, the Begum Rokeya University authorities temporarily suspended two teachers and seven staff members in connection with their involvement in the killing of Abu Sayed.

Poet Shahidullah Faraji honored Abu Sayed by composing the poem বীর আবু সাঈদ (lit. 'Valiant Abu Sayed'), in which he hailed Abu Sayed as the "hero of the generation." In tribute to his legacy, the Rangpur Park intersection was renamed "Shaheed Abu Sayed Chatwar" by students in his honor. (Note: Attributed to multiple sources:)

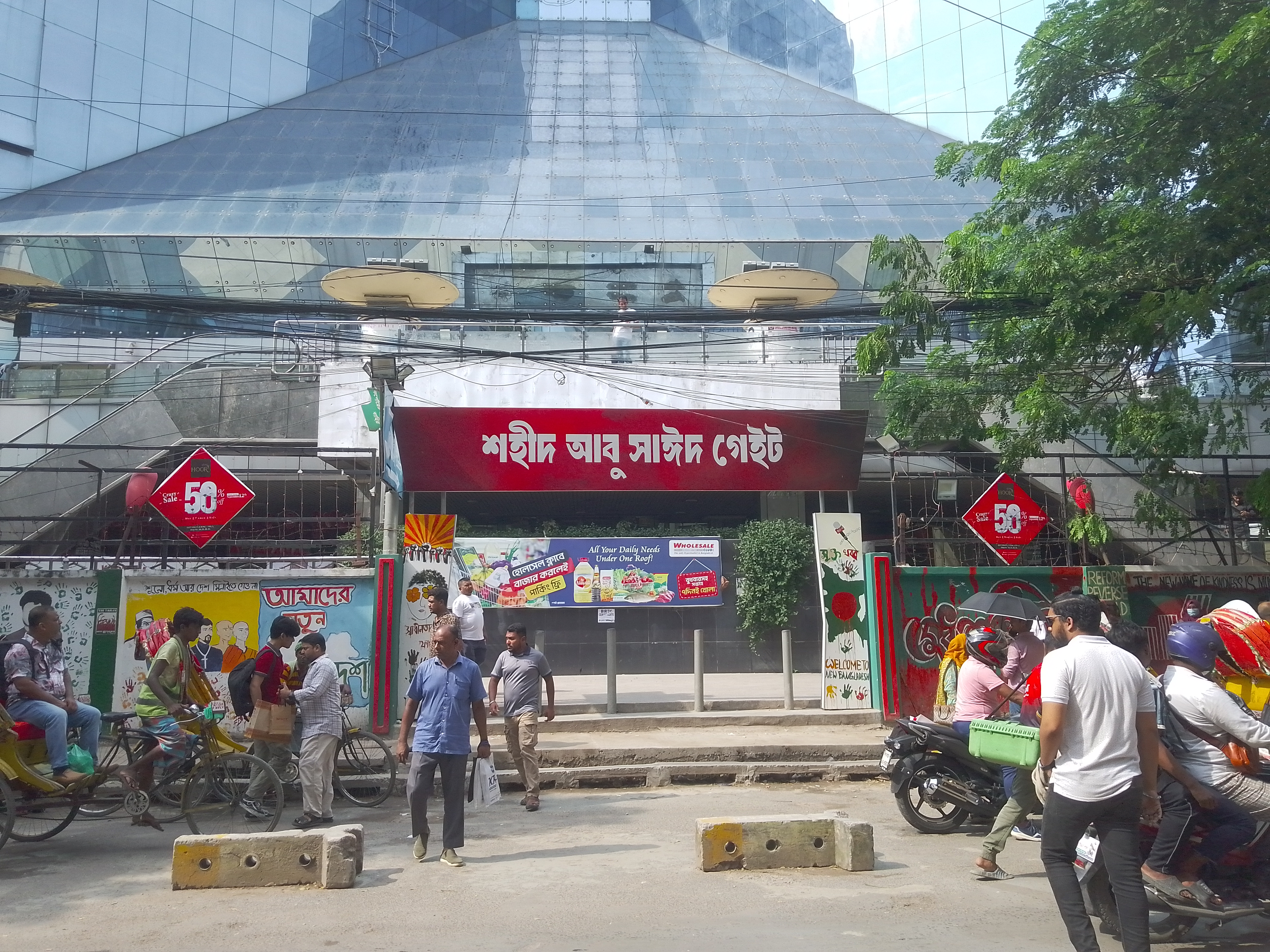
"Martyr Abu Sayed Gate", Jamuna Future Park

On 7 August 2024, Shafiqur Rahman, Ameer of Bangladesh Jamaat-e-Islami, visited Abu Sayed's grave in Rangpur to pay his respects. Following the Resignation of Sheikh Hasina and the dissolution of her cabinet amid July Uprising, Interim government Chief Adviser Muhammad Yunus expressed that Abu Sayed's memory remained "in every person's heart in Bangladesh". Yunus also paid his respects at Abu Sayed’s grave on August 10. The Chairman of the National Board of Revenue, Md Abdur Rahman Khan, went on to refer to Abu Sayed as "Bir Sreshtho" during a discussion at the NBR’s Multipurpose Hall in Dhaka.

In 19 July 2026, the Ministry of Home Affairs of Bangladesh issued a notification approving a new design for the country's passport. Under the approved design, the watermark on pages 32 and 33 is planned to depict Abu Sayed together with fellow July Uprising martyrs Mir Mahfuzur Rahman Mugdho and Wasim Akram, commemorating the 2024 July Uprising.

== Cultural impact ==
The photograph and video footage of Abu Sayed standing with his arms outstretched became among the most recognisable images of the July Uprising. His image was reproduced in graffiti and murals across Bangladesh. After the fall of Sheikh Hasina's government, students recreated murals commemorating him across the country.

In March 2025, the University of Dhaka's Faculty of Fine Arts announced plans to feature a 20-foot sculpture of Sayed in the Bengali New Year procession, depicting his characteristic stance with outstretched arms.

In July 2026, his outstretched-arm image was included among the watermarks in the redesigned Bangladeshi e-passport, alongside images of other people killed during the July uprising, under the heading "July Mass Uprising 2024".

== Gallery ==
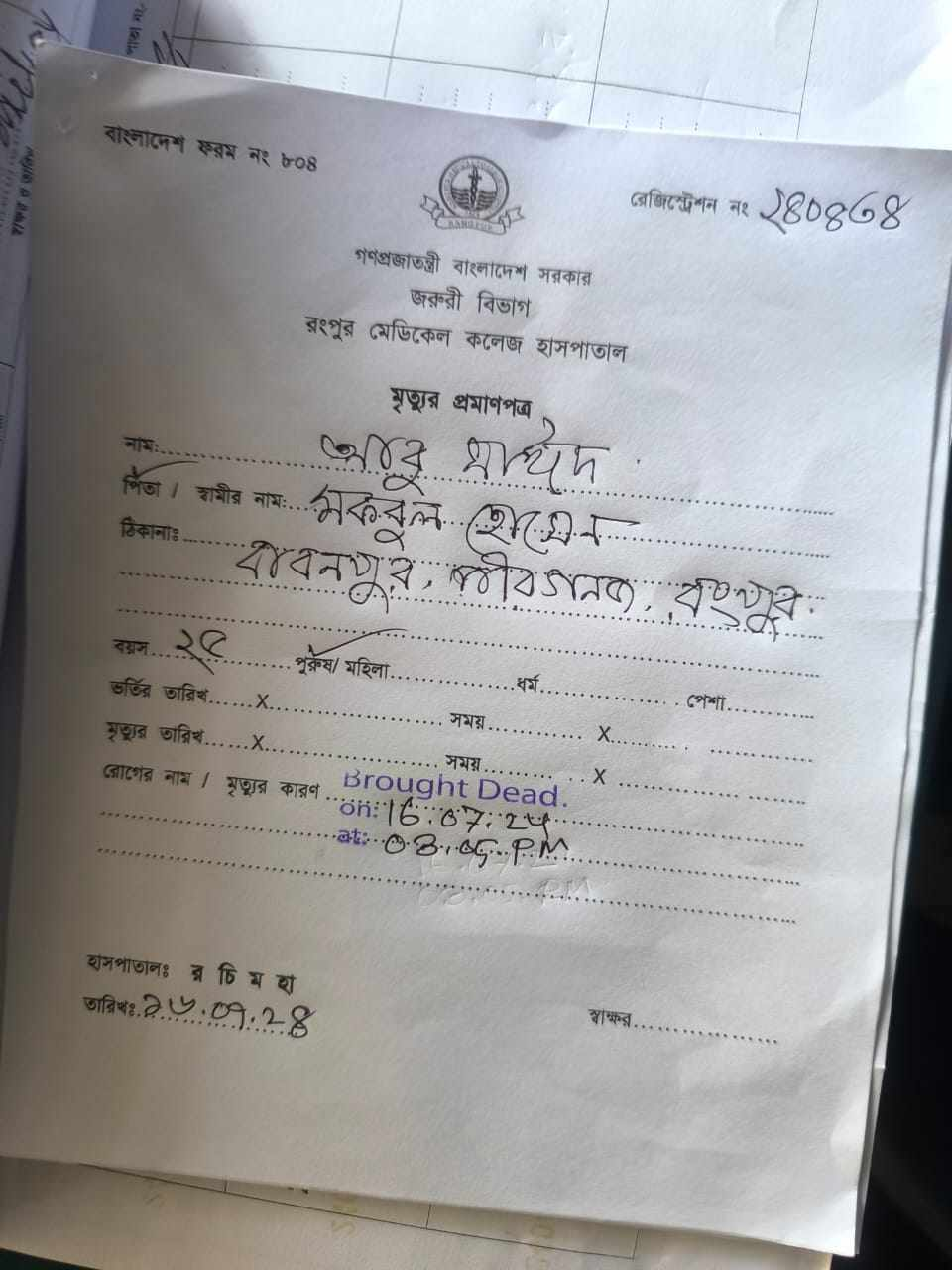
Death certificate of Abu Sayed

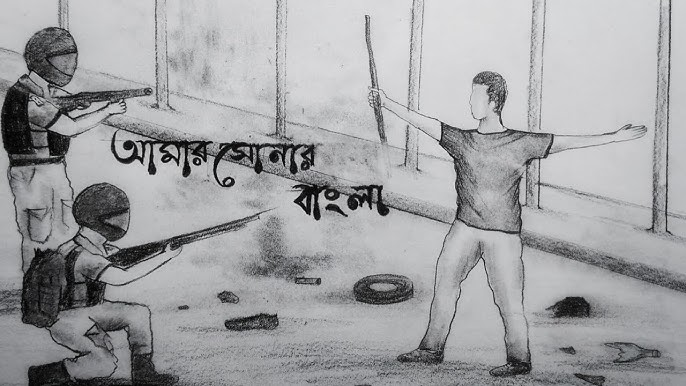
A painting of Abu Sayed being shot

== See also ==
- July massacre
- List of people who died in the July massacre
  - Mir Mugdho
  - Golam Nafiz
