= Sarjis Alam =

Bangladeshi politician and activist

- সারজিস আলম
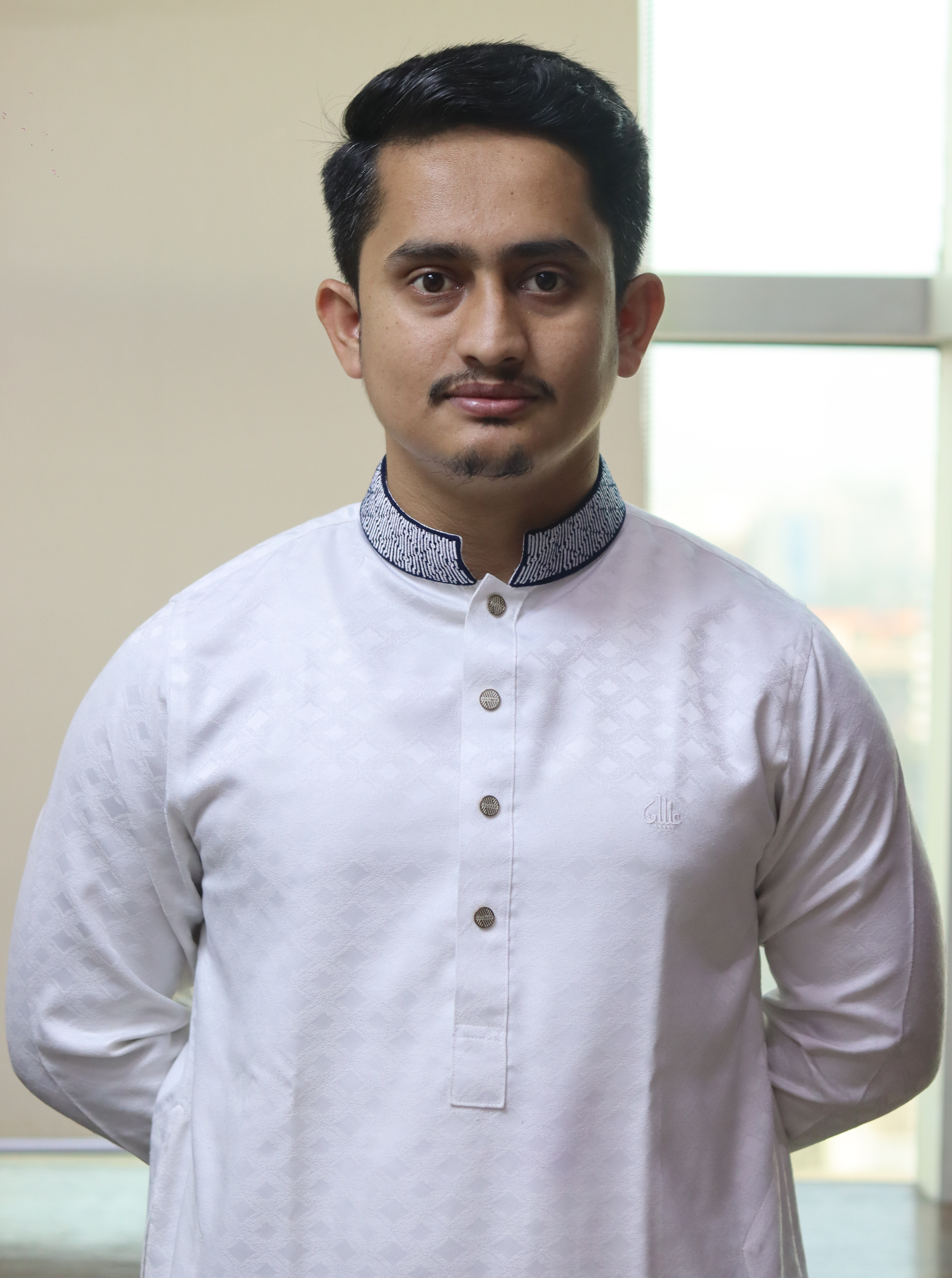
- Sarjis in 2025

Chief Organizer (Northern Region) of the National Citizen Party
- Incumbent
- Assumed office 28 February 2025
- Convener: Nahid Islam
- Preceded by: post established

Former Secretary General of the July Shaheed Smrity Foundation
- In office 21 October 2024 – 22 January 2025
- President: Muhammad Yunus
- Chief Executive: Mir Mahbubur Rahman Snigdho
- Preceded by: Mir Mahbubur Rahman Snigdho

Personal details
- Born: 2 July 1998 (age 28) Atwari Upazila, Panchagarh District, Bangladesh
- Party: National Citizen Party
- Spouse: Raita (m. 2025)
- Education: University of Dhaka
- Occupation: Politician
- Organisations: Jatiya Nagorik Committee (2024–2025); Students Against Discrimination (2024); Bangladesh Chhatra League (2019–2024)

Sarjis Alam (born 2 July 1998) is a Bangladeshi politician and activist. He is one of the coordinators of the Students Against Discrimination, which led the July Uprising leading to the fall of Sheikh Hasina's government. He has been the Chief Organizer (Northern Region) of the National Citizen Party since 2025.

== Biography ==
=== Early life and education ===
Sarjis Alam was born on 23 December 1998 in Atwari Upazila, Panchagarh. His home is in Bamankumar village, Atwari, Panchagarh.

He completed his HSC at BAF Shaheen College Dhaka and earned both his BSc and MSc in Zoology from the University of Dhaka.

=== Activism (2019-2024) ===
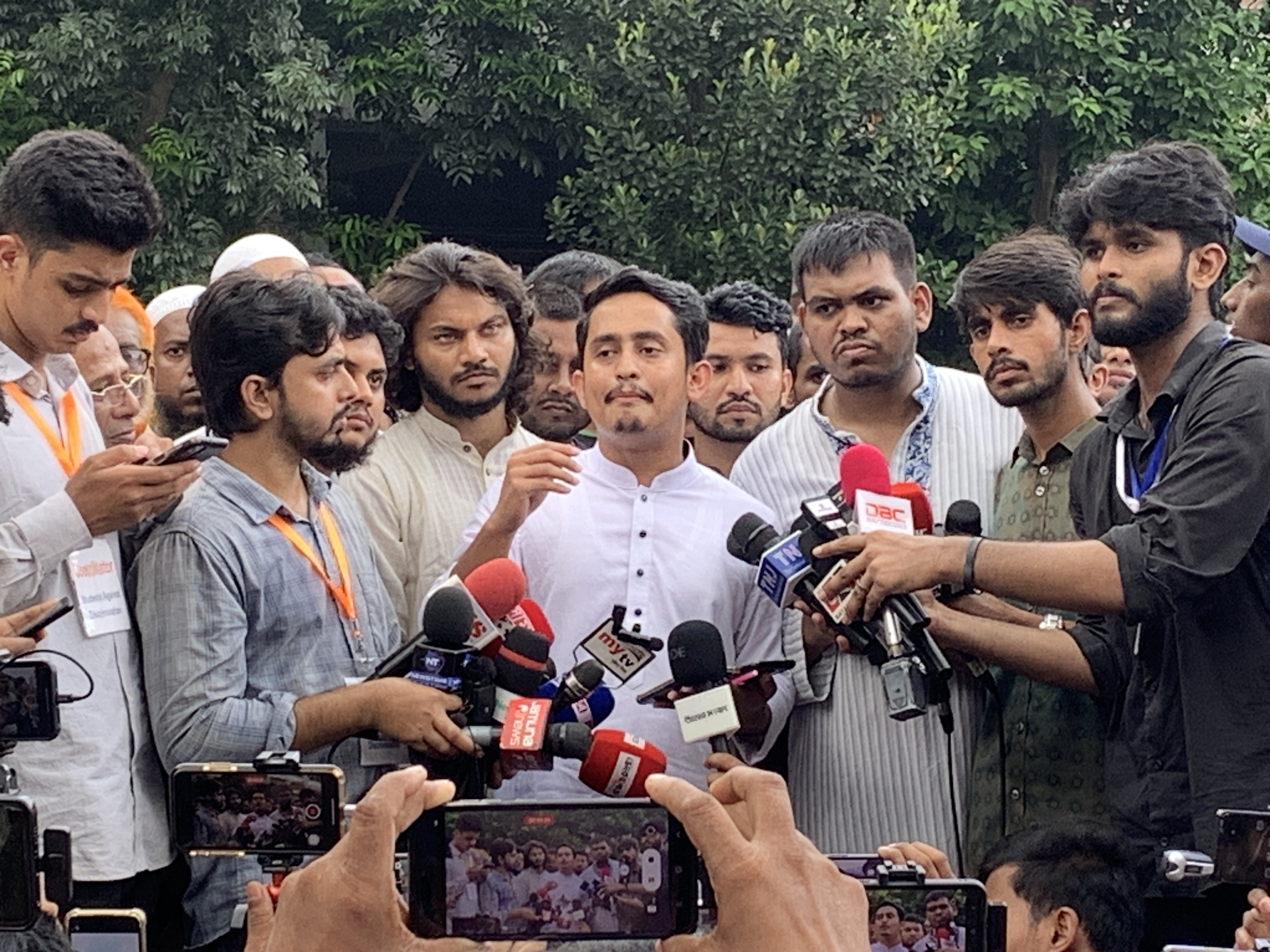
Sarjis addressing the press in 2024

Sarjis joined the Bangladesh Chhatra League in 2017 upon his admission to the University of Dhaka. In 2019, he was elected to the Dhaka University Central Students' Union from the Chhatra League panel. He resigned from the organization in 2022 and also participated in various debate competitions during his academic years.

In 2024, Alam joined the Students Against Discrimination as a coordinator, opposing quotas in government jobs, which evolved into mass uprising culminating in the ouster of Hasina administration. Alam, along with Nahid Islam, Asif Mahmud, Hasnat Abdullah, and several other students from the University of Dhaka gained national recognition in mid-July 2024 when they were detained by the police as the protests became violent.

In the aftermath, on August 5, Prime Minister Sheikh Hasina resigned and went into self-imposed exile in India.

=== Political life (2024-2026) ===
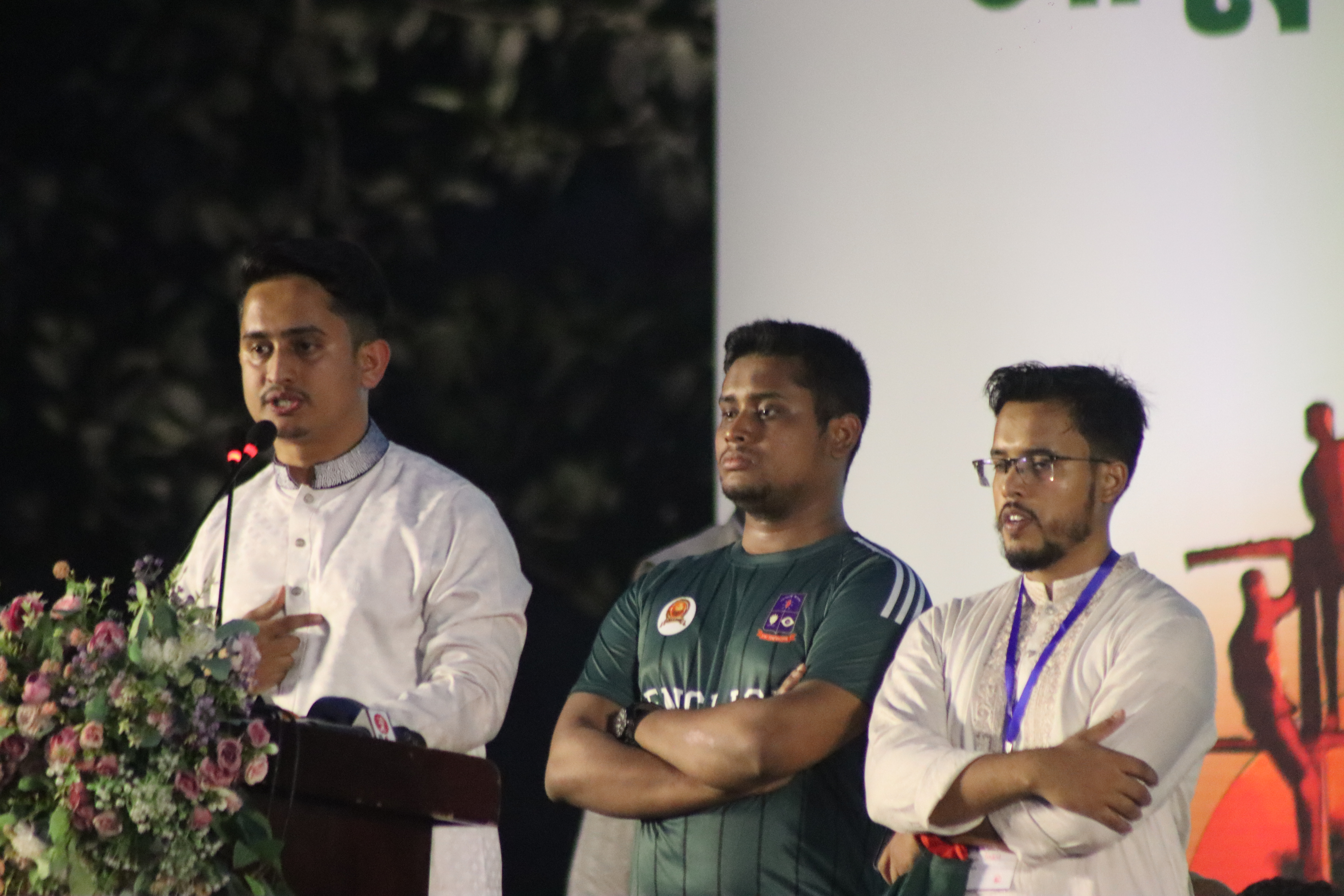
Sarjis Alam at Launch event of the National Citizen Party in 2025

Alam then served as the secretary general of the July Shaheed Smrity Foundation from 21 October 2024 until his resignation on 22 January 2025. On 9 December 2024, he was made the chief organizer of the Jatiya Nagorik Committee.

Following the July Uprising in 2024, the National Citizen Party was officially launched on February 28, 2025, with Alam as its Chief Organizer (Northern Region).

Alam contested in the 2026 general election from Panchagarh-1 constituency and lost.

== Views ==
After initially being appointed to the National Citizen Party's committee following his key contribution to the July Uprising, human rights activist Muntasir Rahman was removed from the expanded 217-member convening committee due to backlash and objections from key leaders like Sarjis Alam and Hasnat Abdullah, who cited Muntasir's LGBTQ+ advocacy as being out of alignment with the party's religious and cultural values. Following which Sarjis Alam explicitly stated that his political movement will "never go against religious values," identifying himself primarily as a Muslim before a politician.

In May 2025, Sarjis Alam posted statements on social media against LGBT people, stating, "Those mentally ill individuals who nurture and promote these deadly diseases that destroy family, society, and the state should be given mental treatment, not encouragement... These are the cancers that can gradually destroy the nation from within the household, and we cannot allow such opportunities." His statement was condemned by human rights groups, such as the Justice Makers Bangladesh Foundation (JMBF), who described it as hate speech. Sarjis Alam has also issued statements raising concerns about feminism potentially somehow being used to usher in LGBT rights, stating, "There will be full support for any logical demands to safeguard women's rights. But if, directly or indirectly, these are used to promote so-called LGBTQ culture — such as homosexuality or transgender identities — which I consider dangerous and destructive, we must resist such efforts."

In 2026, Sarjis Alam once again stated in a public conference that "homosexuality is not a biological demand, but a mental illness" and advocated in favor of government mandated pseudoscientific conversion therapy against LGBT people, as well as accusing "unnamed" "foreign agencies" of spreading the "LGBT agenda" in Bangladesh.

== Personal life ==
Sarjis is the son of Aktaruzzaman Saju, a businessman, and Bakera Begum, a homemaker. His paternal grandfather, Tazir Uddin, was a farmer. Sarjis has one brother who is pursuing an honors degree at Dhaka College. Sarjis got married on 31 January 2025.

== Attacks and security incidents ==
On 27 November 2024, a truck collided with a vehicle in the motorcade of Sarjis Alam and Hasnat Abdullah while they were returning to Dhaka from Chattogram. Alam and Abdullah were not in the vehicle that was struck. Police described the incident as a road accident, while Alam and Abdullah expressed suspicion that it may have been an attempted assassination.

On 5 March 2025, a confrontation took place in Dhaka's Bashundhara Residential Area between students of North South University and people accompanying Alam. The circumstances and the roles of those involved were disputed.

On 16 July 2025, an NCP motorcade carrying Alam and other senior party leaders was attacked after the party's programme in Gopalganj. The leaders later left the area with assistance from security forces.

On 20 October 2025, a crude bomb exploded outside a district council auditorium in Bogra while Alam was attending an NCP meeting there.

On 10 February 2026, Alam's motorcade was reportedly attacked during an election campaign in Panchagarh.

On 6 July 2026, a bomb-like explosion occurred at an NCP rally in Savar while Alam and other party leaders were on the stage. At least three people were injured, and police subsequently arrested two suspects.

On 28 July 2026, Alam and NCP leader Nasiruddin Patwary's motorcade was attacked following an NCP programme in Habiganj. Stones and bricks were thrown at Alam's vehicle, prompting him to take shelter in a Sonali Bank office before being rescued by police. National Citizen Party announced nationwide demonstrations in protest of the incident.
