= July massacre =

2024 mass killing of protesters in Bangladesh

- Part of July Uprising
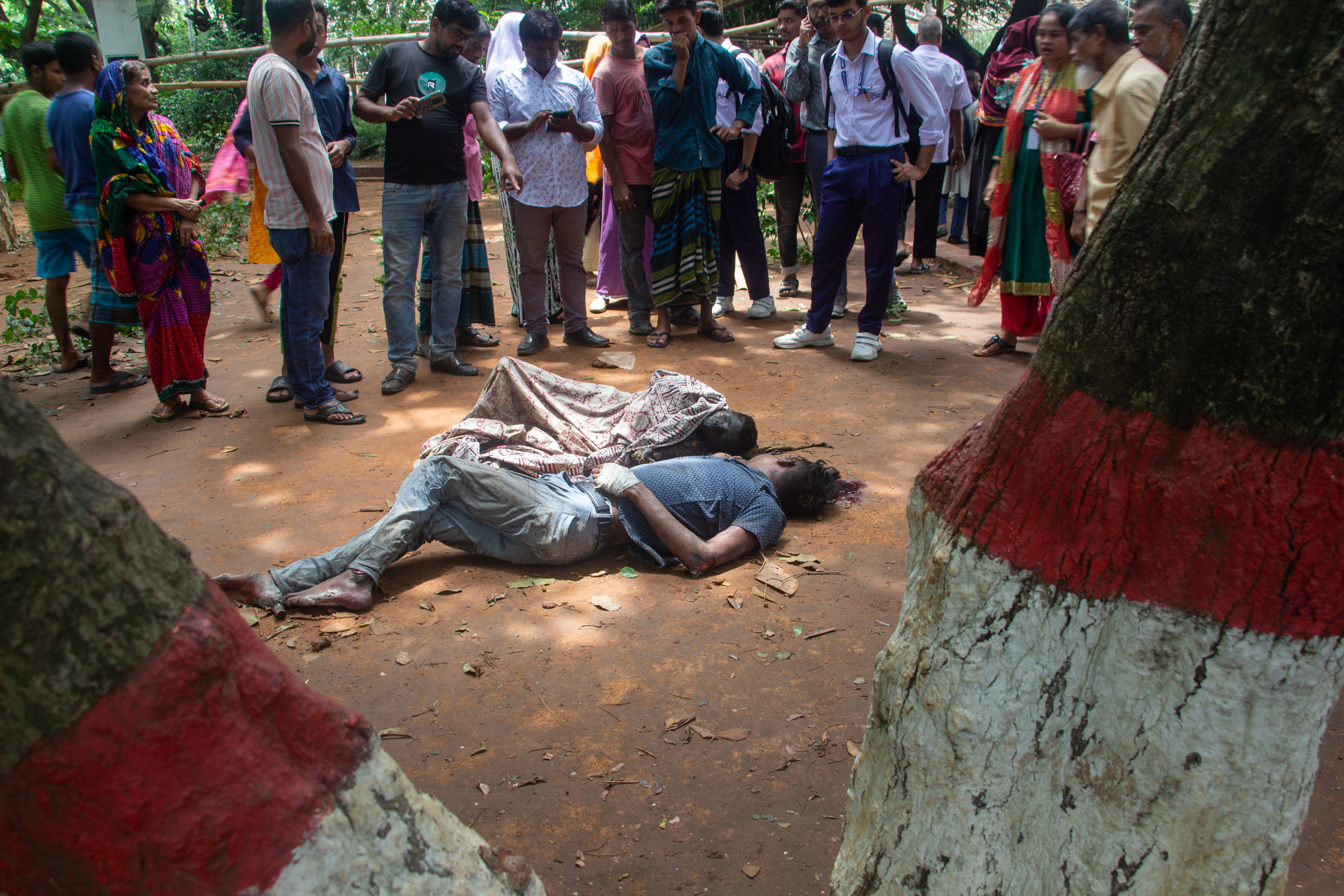
- Two protesters killed in a clash between police, Chhatra League, and demonstrators in Dhaka
- Native name: জুলাই গণহত্যা
- Location: Bangladesh
- Date: 6 June 2024 – 5 August 2024 (1 month, 4 weeks and 2 days)
- Target: Protestors; Political opposition; Civilians
- Attack type: Massacre, mass killing
- Deaths: 1,000+ (MOHFW estimate); 1,400+ (OHCHR estimate) (Note: Cited by the International Crimes Tribunal during the Trial of Sheikh Hasina.); 1,581 (SAD estimate)
- Injuries: 20,000+ (including children) (Note: See references:)
- Perpetrators: Bangladesh Police; Armed Police Battalion; Rapid Action Battalion; Border Guard Bangladesh
- Assailant: Government of Bangladesh; Awami League; Chhatra League; Jubo League; Swechasebak League
- Motive: Suppression of the quota reform movement
- Inquiry: International Crimes Tribunal; OHCHR FFTB report
- Litigation: Trial of Sheikh Hasina

The July massacre (Note: Sources calling it the July massacre:) (Note: Bengali: জুলাই গণহত্যা, romanized: Julai Gôṇôhôtya, pronounced [ˈdʒulai̯ ˈɡɔnoˌhotːaˑ]) was the violent suppression and mass killings in Bangladesh during the July Uprising from 6 June to 5 August 2024. Triggered by the reinstatement of a controversial quota system and widespread public dissatisfaction, the crackdown was carried out by the government led by the Awami League, its affiliated groups such as the Chhatra League, and various law-enforcement agencies.

In June 2024, the Bangladesh Supreme Court reinstated the quota system in government jobs, triggering the resurgence of the quota reform movement in early July. Following weeks of demonstrations, tensions escalated on July 15 after clashes between protesters and members of the Chhatra League. In the days that followed, law enforcement agencies, including the Police, RAB, and BGB, as well as members of the ruling party's student, youth and volunteer wings, were involved in violent confrontations with the protesters.

These clashes resulted in numerous deaths, including among protesters, law enforcement personnel, party members, bystanders, and children. By early August, the violence had resulted in substantial casualties, with estimates of fatalities ranging from two hundred to one thousand, and thousands more reported injured. The Hasina government denied responsibility, attributing the violence to other factors.

== Background ==
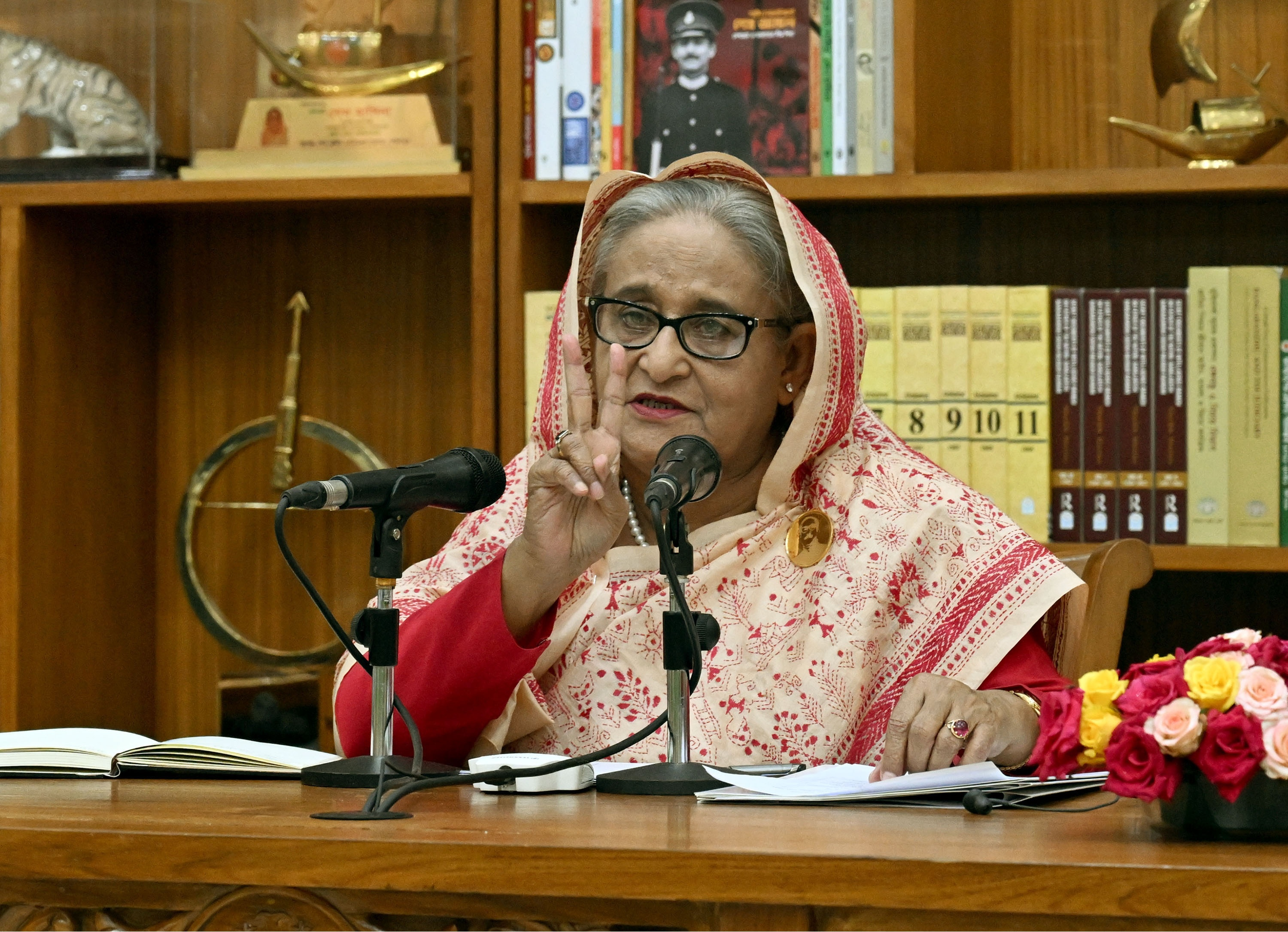
At this press conference on 14 July 2024, Sheikh Hasina linked the quota reform protesters to Razakars, drawing sharp criticism and further escalating the unrest that ultimately culminated in her resignation.

The massacre was a significant event in the political spectrum of Bangladesh, and part of the ongoing unrest that began in mid-2024. The Supreme Court's decision to reinstate a 30% job quota for descendants of freedom fighters sparked initial protests as the decision reversed reforms from 2018 made in response to the 2018 Bangladesh quota reform movement. This decision led to widespread dissatisfaction, particularly among students who felt that the quota system limited merit-based opportunities.

The protests, initially centered on opposing the quota system, quickly spread nationwide, driven by broader public concerns about the government's management of the economy, allegations of corruption, human rights issues, and a perceived lack of democratic channels for change.

In response to the protests, the government, led by the Awami League, ordered the closure of all educational institutions and deployed security forces nationwide, including the Bangladesh Police, the Rapid Action Battalion (RAB) and Border Guard Bangladesh (BGB). Additionally, some ministers and members of the Awami League reportedly influenced its affiliated organisations, such as the Chhatra League (the student wing), the Jubo League (the youth wing), and the Swechasebak League (the volunteer wing), to take measures against the protesters. These actions included the use of lethal force, with reports indicating that members of these groups were involved in incidents resulting in the deaths of several protesters, many of whom were students.

As the situation escalated, the government imposed a nationwide shoot-at-sight curfew and enacted an extensive blackout of internet and mobile connectivity, effectively isolating Bangladesh. Social media platforms like Facebook, TikTok and WhatsApp were blocked to disrupt the protestors' ability to organise and communicate.

== Massacre ==
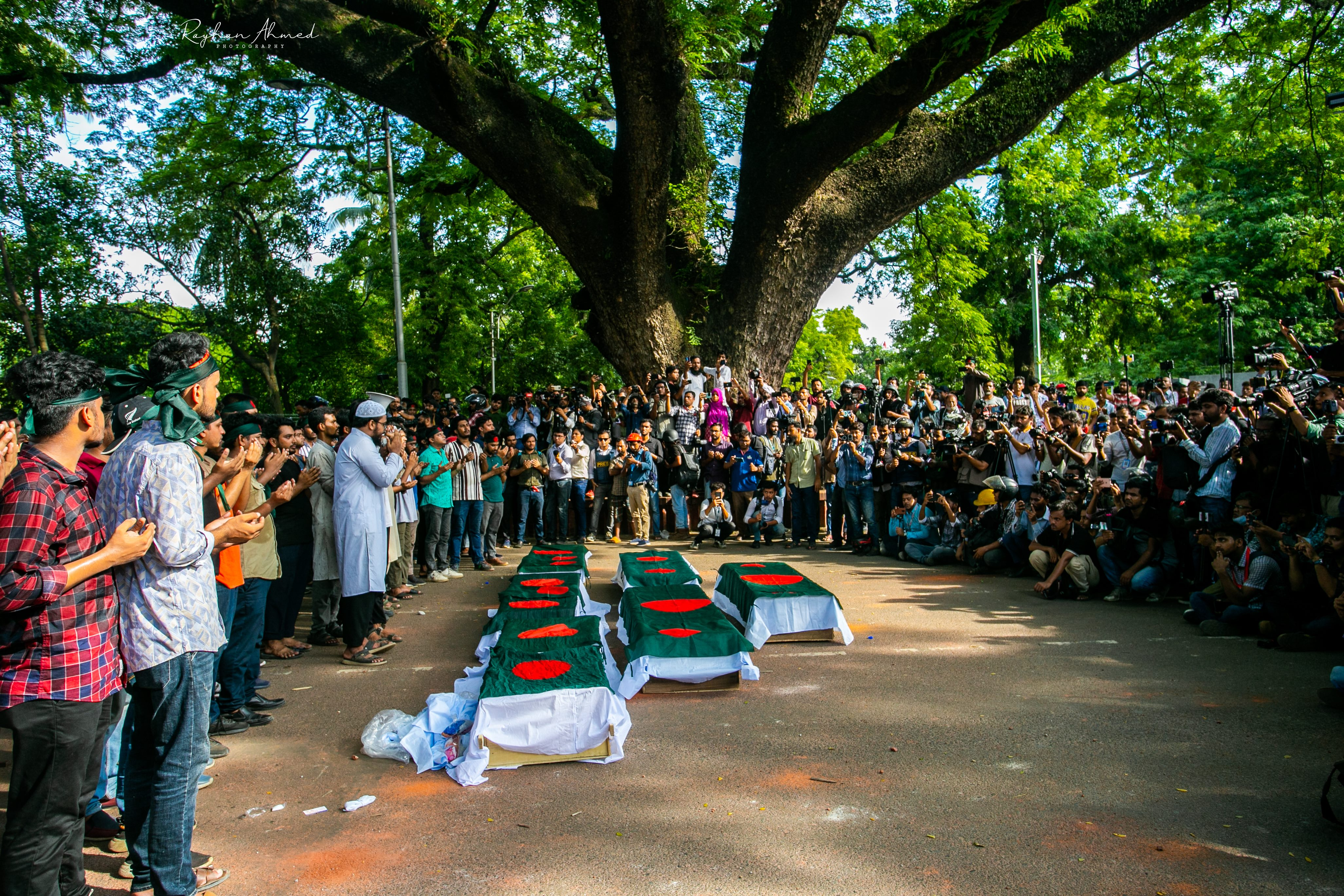
Absentee funeral prayer of the deceased protesters in the University of Dhaka

=== Number of victims ===
On 16 July five people were killed during clashes between protesters and police in the 2024 quota reform movement. It was the first fatality reported during the movement.

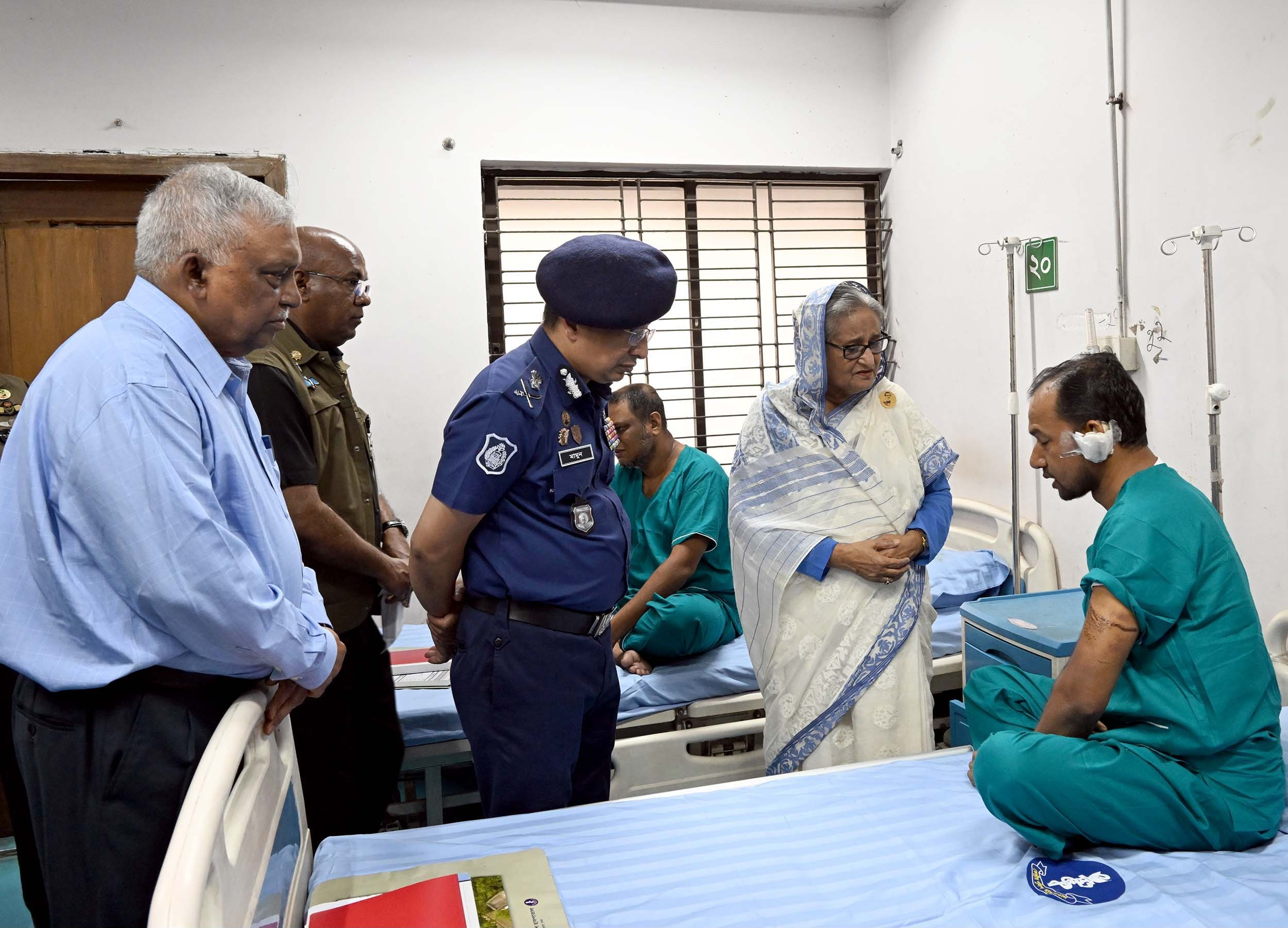
Sheikh Hasina, Asaduzzaman Khan, and Chowdhury Abdullah Al-Mamun visiting injured police officers at Rajarbag Police Hospital on 28 July 2024, following the violent suppression of protesters of the July Revolution. All three were later named in criminal cases related to the July massacre.

In July 2024 approximately 46 unidentified bodies were buried in Dhaka's Rayerbazar graveyard. Graveyard workers reported a rise in these burials starting from 19 July, although the cemetery's official records did not document these unidentified individuals.

In August 2024 it was reported that 78% of the fatalities sustained lethal bullet wounds. According to the Office of the United Nations High Commissioner for Human Rights, the massacre resulted in 650 deaths from 16 July to 11 August 2024. However, in an interview, the Home Affairs adviser M. Sakhawat Hossain indicated that the actual death toll may be closer to 1,000.

A report published on 11 August 2024 indicated that obtaining accurate information about the number of fatalities during the July events was hindered by a government directive that restricted the disclosure of the exact death toll to the media.

=== Chankharpul massacre ===
On 12 September 2024, over a month after the incident and Hasina's resignation, Constable Sujon Hossain was arrested for his involvement in the Chankharpul massacre. The International Crimes Tribunal issued an order for Hossain to be incarcerated for crimes against humanity on 12 January 2025.

The Students Against Discrimination reported that 266 individuals died between 16 and 25 July. However, Prothom Alo reported that 624 people died between July 16 and August 16, with 354 of those deaths occurring before the resignation of Sheikh Hasina. Among the total reported deaths, 66 were children. Additionally, certain reports have also indicated that among the deceased, 117 were associated with the Bangladesh Nationalist Party and 87 with the Bangladesh Jamaat-e-Islami.

=== Rampura massacre ===
On 19 July, a violent suppression of a students' protest in Rampura Thana, Dhaka by the Police and BGB resulted in at least 11 deaths and more than 21 injured. The killings were led by Muhammad Redwanul Islam, a major with the Border Guard Bangladesh.

=== Ashulia immolation killings ===
In August 2024 an incident occurred near Ashulia Police Station in Savar, where a video surfaced showing police officers piling up dead bodies on a van known as "Ashulia immolation killings". The footage went viral on social media, leading to widespread outrage and demands for accountability. The video depicts several bloodstained bodies, partially covered with bedsheets, being placed on a van by individuals wearing police vests and carrying firearms. The event was believed to have occurred on 5 August, following the resignation of Sheikh Hasina. In response to the viral video, the Dhaka District Police formed a four-member committee to investigate the incident. Led by Additional Superintendent of Police Sajadur Rahman, the committee was tasked with verifying the authenticity of the video and identifying those responsible. Although the police have acknowledged the presence of the officers at the scene, they have refrained from disclosing their names, pending further steps in the investigation.

The Cybercrime team has been engaged to aid in verifying the footage and gathering evidence.

Documents from Dhaka Medical College and Hospital indicated that 1,700 people were admitted during the protests, with 98 reported deaths. However, doctors and hospital officials suggested that over 100 people died at the hospital, with many not officially recorded. Additionally, several bodies with bullet wounds were forcibly taken by families before autopsies could be conducted.

=== Controversies ===
In August 2024 a video surfaced in which an unidentified police officer was heard telling the former home minister Asaduzzaman Khan that the use of force, including lethal measures, had not been effective in dispersing the protesters.

==== Helicopter use ====
RAB Bell 407 helicopter hovering above protesters during a quota reform protest in Dhaka

There were reports alleging that the Rapid Action Battalion (RAB) fired at protesters from helicopters during the unrest. On 18 July RAB utilised helicopters to evacuate police personnel from the campus of the Canadian University of Bangladesh. Some protesters claimed that shots were fired from the helicopters, resulting in the deaths of ten children. RAB, however, denied these accusations, stating that only tear gas and sound grenades were deployed from the helicopters.

==== Death of children ====
Additionally, questions were raised regarding the death of 11-year-old Shafkat Samir on 19 July, with some attributing it to a bullet fired from a helicopter. RAB refuted this claim, explaining that the trajectory and speed of the bullet did not correspond with such an incident.

==== Allegations of Indian Involvement ====
On 24 September 2024 Chief Prosecutor of the International Crimes Tribunal (ICT), Mohammad Tajul Islam, alleged that some of the gunmen involved in the July–August protest crackdown were disguised in police uniforms and spoke in Hindi. Eyewitnesses reported that the attackers used Hindi-language insults, raising suspicions of Indian involvement in the operation.

== Fatalities ==
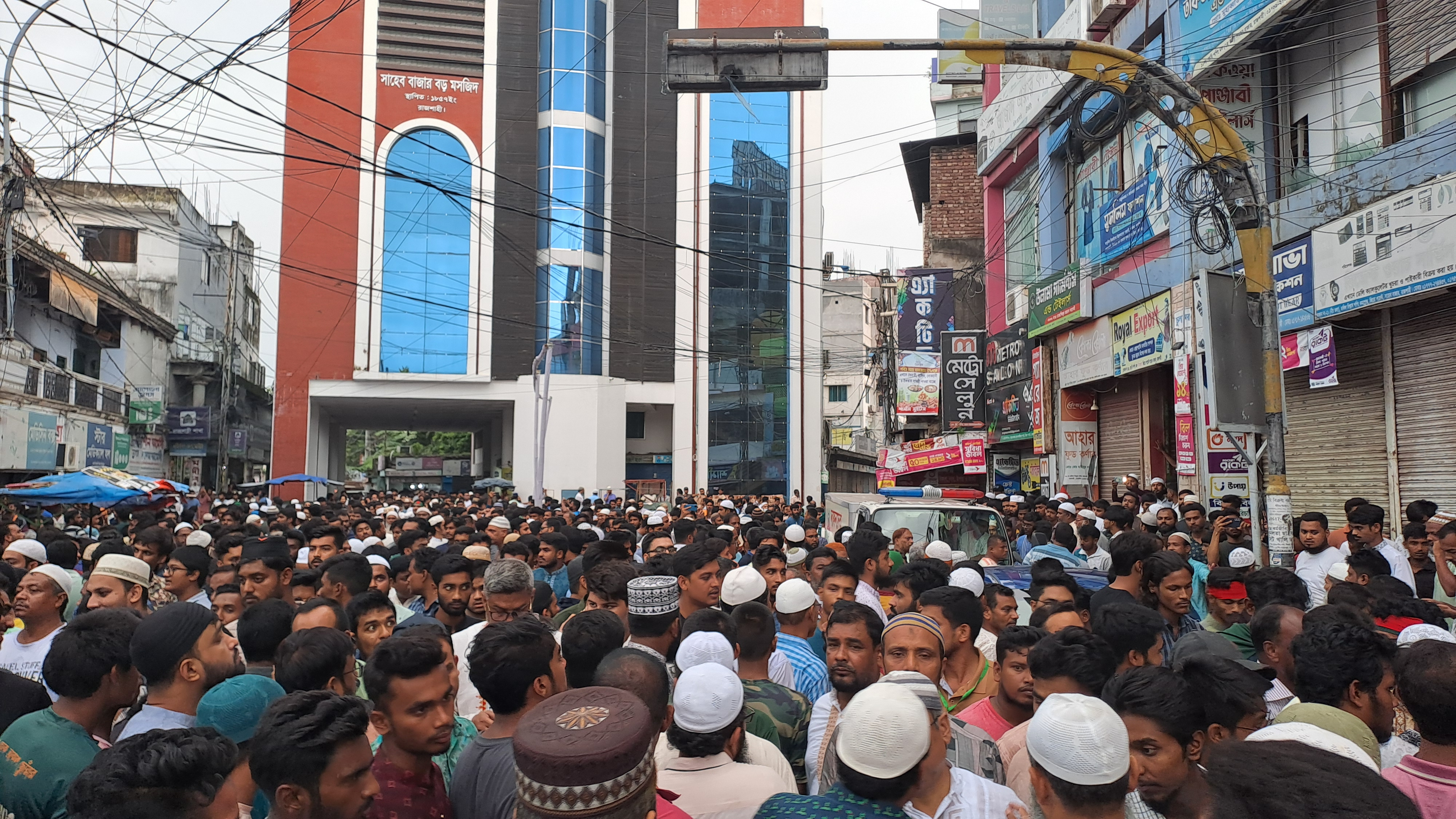
People gathering for the funeral of a protester in Rajshahi

=== Death toll ===
By early August 2024, the unrest resulted in a significant death toll. Initial official reports claimed 215 deaths, but a United Nations investigation later confirmed that at least 650 people were killed. In August the Interim Government's Health and Welfare Adviser, Nurjahan Begum, reported that over 1,000 individuals had been killed in the uprising and more than 400 students had lost their eyesight. According to the Health Sub-Committee of the Students Against Discrimination, the total number of deaths during the protests was reported to be 1,581. Additionally, more than 20,000 were injured, and over 11,000 were arrested nationwide. Among the deceased were at least 32 children, according to UNICEF. The exact number of casualties remains uncertain due to government restrictions on information, including reports that hospitals were barred from sharing data, CCTV footage was confiscated, and some victims were buried without identification.

=== Selected individual fatalities ===
==== Abu Sayed ====
On 16 July, between 2:30 and 3:00 pm, quota reform protesters and police clashed in front of Begum Rokeya University. Police fired tear gas and baton-charged to disperse protesting students. Most of the students left while Abu Sayed remained. The police were firing rubber bullets from the opposite direction. Abu Sayed was subsequently shot four times by a police officer. He died before being taken to hospital.

==== Mir Mugdho ====
On 18 July 2024, Mugdho set out to distribute food and water to the protestors. His twin brother, Snigdho, was planning to come with him, but Mugdho asked him not to. He began distributing food and water at 4 pm. In a video recorded fifteen minutes before his death, he is seen distributing water bottles and boxes of biscuits to protesters. Around 5 pm, when he was at the side of the road, he was shot at Azampur intersection in Uttara. The bullet entered through his forehead and exited through the right side of his head. His body was taken to Uttara Crescent Hospital, where he was pronounced dead on arrival.

==== Golam Nafiz ====
On the first day of the non-cooperation movement, Nafiz and his friends joined protests in the Farmgate–Khamarbari area. Around 4.30 pm, Nafiz was shot by the police at the Farmgate intersection. After being wounded, fellow protesters placed him in a rickshaw in an attempt to transport him to the nearest hospital. According to rickshaw puller Noor Mohammad, Nafiz was unconscious but still alive at that time. However, members of the Chhatra League obstructed the rickshaw, causing a delay in reaching the hospital. Upon arrival, doctors declared Nafiz dead.

==== Farhan Faiyaaz ====
Faiyaaz was an eleventh-grade student of Dhaka Residential Model College. During the first day of the "Complete Shutdown" on 18 July, he participated in the protests with his friends in the Dhanmondi area and they found themselves caught in clashes between protesting students and police, as well as armed cadres from the Awami League. Around 2 pm, he was shot through the heart. He suffered a significant blood loss while getting transported to the hospital, however was declared dead soon after. Following his death, a relative of Faiyaaz posted on Facebook demanding justice for his killing, which quickly sparked widespread outrage across the country. This uproar intensified further when the educators Munzereen Shahid and Ayman Sadiq also posted demanding justice.

Faiyaaz's Facebook bio became popular after his death, which was one of the lyrics of the song "The Nights":

One day, you'll leave this world behind. So live a life you will remember.

On 6 August 2024, in honour of Faiyaaz, the street near Dhaka Residential Model College was renamed to Shaheed Farhan Road. A field beside the Jatiya Sangsad Bhaban was renamed Shaheed Farhan Faiyaaz Khelar Maath (Martyr Farhan Faiyaaz Sports Ground) in his commemoration.

==== Shaykh Ashabul Yamin ====
Yamin was a student of the computer science department at the Military Institute of Science and Technology in Mirpur. On 16 July 2024, amidst the escalating tensions during the quota reform protests, Ashabul went to observe the demonstrations near the Savar bus stand after offering prayers in his local neighbourhood of Bank Town, Savar.

Around noon, a violent confrontation broke out between the protesters and the police at the Pakija bus stand. During the clash, police fired rubber bullets and tear gas, and Ashabul was struck by several pellets in his chest. He was quickly taken to Savar Enam Medical College Hospital but was pronounced dead upon arrival at around 3:00 pm.

Yamin's death became a symbol of the violence that marked the protests. His name was invoked in subsequent demonstrations as a reminder of the conflict. Despite official denials by the authorities, eyewitnesses confirmed the death was caused by police firing.

Subsequently, a video emerged on social media showing two armed police officers forcibly removing him from the top of an armored personnel carrier to the side of the vehicle, where he was shot at close range. Following the fall of the Hasina administration, A Additional Superintendent of Police from Savar, Abdullahel Kafi, was arrested in connection with Yamin's killing and was placed on a five-day remand.

==== Riya Gope ====
On 19 July 2024 Riya Gope, a six-year-old girl from the Noyamati area in Narayanganj, was struck by a stray bullet while playing on the roof of her family's home during clashes related to the quota reform protests. The bullet hit her in the back of the head as her father attempted to bring her inside. She was taken to a local hospital and later transferred to Dhaka Medical College Hospital, where she underwent surgery. After five days of treatment, Riya succumbed to her injuries. Riya was among the youngest and one of four individuals injured in the clashes that day in Narayanganj who later died.

==== Tahir Zaman Priyo ====
Tahir Zaman Priyo was a freelance journalist and videographer, who was associated with the online news portal The Report24 as a video journalist. On 19 July, at around 5 pm, when Priyo was covering the protest on Central Road in Dhaka, the police began firing lethal bullets at the crowd. One point, a bullet hit Priyo's head and he collapsed. His friends tried to take him to the hospital, but it was not possible due to continuous gunfire from the police. At 10 pm his body was found in the Dhaka Medical College mortuary. His death raised global concern about the safety of journalists in Bangladesh and was condemned internationally.

==== Shahriar Khan Anas ====
Anas was a tenth-grade student at Adarsha Academy, Gendaria in Old Dhaka. On 5 August he left a letter to his parents before participating in the protest, where he was fatally shot three times by the police in the Chankharpul area of Dhaka. His body was later recovered from Dhaka Mitford Hospital and laid to rest at Jurain Cemetery. Following his death, the letter went viral on social media, sparking outrage across the country and demands for justice. Later in his honour, Deen Nath Sen Road in Gendaria was renamed "Shahid Anas Road".

== Aftermath ==
=== Reactions ===
The July massacre prompted significant criticism and calls for accountability. The University Teachers Network held a demonstration at the University of Dhaka, expressing concern over the violence.

Protibadi Nagorik Somaj condemned the killings during the movement, describing them as a massacre and expressing doubts about the judiciary's ability to deliver impartial justice, as the inquiry commission was formed by the Fifth Hasina ministry, which is also accused of involvement in the massacre. Some academics rejected the government-established public inquiry commission, calling for intervention from the United Nations.

In Sylhet, Nagorik Alem Somaj organised a protest criticising the killings.

Sheikh Hasina, in her first public statement published through her son Sajeeb Wazed, since being ousted from power, called for an investigation into the deaths during the protests, while also asserting that the police and the Awami League were victims of "terrorist aggression".

Govinda Pramanik, president of the Bangladesh National Hindu Grand Alliance, alleged that the government had killed over 500 innocent people to maintain power, urging that the events be prosecuted at the International Crimes Tribunal in Bangladesh.

Several trade unions and organisations also criticised the killings, demanding justice for those who lost their lives during the July massacre.

A protest march under the banner of Chittagong University Chhatra Dal in Chattogram demanded prosecution against Hasina for the massacre.

The Left Democratic Alliance, Jatiya Samajtantrik Dal and the Anti-Fascist Left Front criticised the Awami League government rule, urging financial compensation for the families of those killed in the protests and free medical care for the injured. Similarly, the National Democratic Party demanded ৳10 million in compensation for the families of those who died during the massacre, along with a government job for at least one member of each affected family.

Islami Andolan Bangladesh called for an independent tribunal to ensure justice for the victims of the massacre. In addition, the People's Rights Party called for all political parties within the Grand Alliance, including Awami League, to be barred from future elections.

=== Non–cooperation movement and Resignation of Sheikh Hasina ===
Following the intensification of the July 2024 protests, the non-cooperation movement became a major response to the government's actions. On 4 August thousands of protesters assembled at Shahbag intersection in Dhaka, using the blockade as a form of civil disobedience to demand the resignation of the government. The movement aimed to disrupt normal operations and challenge the authorities.

To support their cause, Students Against Discrimination has enacted a broad non-cooperation strategy. Public-sector operations were significantly affected: bureaucrats and district officials abstained from their duties, and luxury stores, showrooms, shops, hotels, and restaurants were closed. Essential services such as hospitals, pharmacies, and emergency relief continued, but grocery stores operated only briefly during limited hours. Offshore transactions were halted to prevent possible smuggling of funds.

The Non–cooperation movement led to significant unrest. Nationwide, at least 97 people were reported dead due to confrontations, shootings, and clashes. Among the fatalities were forty-four police officers, with thirteen killed at the Enayetpur police station in Sirajganj and one in Eliotganj, Comilla. Additionally, twenty-seven police facilities were attacked and vandalised, and around one hundred police officers were injured. In Dhaka various vehicles were set on fire, including those at the Bangladesh Medical University.

The government responded with a nationwide internet blackout starting at noon on August 4, blocking major social media platforms to limit communication and information dissemination. An indefinite curfew was imposed beginning at 6:00 p.m., and all courts were closed. The government also declared a three-day general holiday from August 5, during which banks and many businesses were closed. Despite these measures, the Students Against Discrimination announced plans of Long March to Dhaka campaign on 5 August, prompting a further crackdown.

On 5 August 2024, amid escalating protests and violence, Prime Minister Sheikh Hasina resigned and fled the country. The political vacuum led to immediate discussions about establishing an interim government to restore order and address the demands of the protesters.

The Chief of Army Staff, Waker-uz-Zaman, convened a meeting with representatives from the Bangladesh Nationalist Party (BNP), Jatiya Party (Ershad), and Bangladesh Jamaat-e-Islami. The meeting resulted in a call for the formation of an interim government within 48 hours, explicitly excluding the Awami League. In subsequent developments, the Nobel Prize laureate Muhammad Yunus was approached to lead the Interim government. Other potential candidates included Salahuddin Ahmed, former governor of Bangladesh Bank; the retired General Jahangir Alam Chowdhury; and the lawyer Sara Hossain. Yunus accepted the role as the chief adviser, and his nomination received support from prominent figures within the Students Against Discrimination.

In a bid to address the ongoing crisis and to signal a shift in policy, President Mohammed Shahabuddin ordered the release of all students detained during the protests and Khaleda Zia, a former prime minister and chairperson of the BNP. This decision was made unanimously at a meeting with major opposition parties and Bangladesh Armed Forces leaders.

On 6 August Mohammed Shahabuddin dissolved the Jatiya Sangsad, responding to an ultimatum from the student movement that threatened further demonstrations. He also carried out a reorganisation within the Bangladesh Armed Forces and removed Chowdhury Abdullah Al Mamun as Inspector-General of the Bangladesh Police.

Following these actions, Shahabuddin formally appointed Muhammad Yunus as the head of the Interim government on 7 August. Yunus, who had been in Paris as a guest for the 2024 Summer Olympics, returned to Dhaka on 8 August and was inaugurated along with his cabinet at the Bangabhaban. The interim government included notable figures from the student movement, such as Nahid Islam, Asif Mahmud and Mahfuj Alam, as advisers, reflecting a view of addressing the demands of the protesters through a transitional period.

== Investigations ==
=== United Nations ===
On 12 February 2025, the United Nations Human Rights fact-finding report on Bangladesh's July-August 2024 protests documented systematic human rights violations committed by security forces and Awami League supporters against protesters. The unrest began with student-led demonstrations against the reinstated quota system for public jobs but escalated due to violent suppression by the police, the Rapid Action Battalion (RAB), Border Guard Bangladesh (BGB) and the military. The government employed extrajudicial killings, mass arrests, torture, enforced disappearances, and sexual violence, resulting in over 1,400 protest-related deaths and 13,500 injuries, including children. Internet shutdowns and media censorship were used to limit public awareness. Armed Awami League supporters also attacked demonstrators, particularly women, who faced sexual and gender-based violence. In retaliation, opposition groups engaged in revenge attacks on Awami League members, the police, and media perceived as pro-government, while also targeting religious and indigenous minorities. The report calls for urgent reforms, including an end to militarised policing, independent investigations into abuses, protection of journalists and civil society, and economic and judicial reforms to address systemic corruption and inequality. It warns that some violations may constitute crimes against humanity, requiring international accountability measures.

=== Bangladesh ===
In response to the events of 16 July the Hasina ministry appointed Justice Khandaker Diliruzzaman on 18 July to lead an investigation into the incident. Subsequently, on 1 August, a three-member commission was formed, including Justices Khandaker Diliruzzaman, K. M. Zahid Sarwar, and Mohammad Showkat Ali Chowdhury, to investigate the occurrences between 16 and 21 July.

On 14 August Asif Nazrul, the Interim governments law adviser, announced that the crimes committed during the July massacre would be prosecuted at the International Crimes Tribunal. Later, Volker Türk, the head of the United Nations Commission on Human Rights, issued a press release stating that investigations into the killings during the protests would commence soon.

On 13 August the former Awami League MP Nizam Uddin Hazari was named as a primary suspect in a murder case related to the killing of an auto-rickshaw driver in Feni during the protests on 4 August. Approximately 400 other members and officials of the Awami League were also charged, including Feni Sadar Upazila Chairman Shusen Chandra Shil, the Awami League President of the upazila, and Feni Municipality Mayor Nazrul Islam Swapan Miazi.

Further, on 14 August, the father of a student who was killed during the protests filed a petition at the International Crimes Tribunal. The petition called for an investigation into charges of genocide and crimes against humanity against Sheikh Hasina and nine other individuals, including the General Secretary of Bangladesh Awami League, the former Road Transport and Bridges Minister Obaidul Quader, and the former Minister of Home Affairs Asaduzzaman Khan Kamal, due to their roles in the crackdown on the protests. The Awami League and its associated organisations were also named as accused in the petition, leading to the court initiating a formal investigation the same day. On 15 August two additional murder charges were filed against Sheikh Hasina and several of her associates related to the deaths of two individuals during the protests.

Anisul Huq, the former Law Minister, who was later arrested on murder charges related to the quota protests, accused Asaduzzaman Khan Kamal and Obaidul Quader during his remand on 16 August, of endorsing the aggressive suppression of protesters. He also criticized Sheikh Hasina for failing to grasp the seriousness of the situation during the movement.

== Legal proceedings ==
On 19 August 2024 the Bangladesh War Crimes Tribunal initiated investigations into three "mass murder" cases against Sheikh Hasina, including charges related to the killing of 450 protesters during the unrest.

Another trial by the Bangladesh War Crimes Tribunal sentenced Asaduzzaman Khan and Sheikh Hasina to death on 17 November 2025, finding them guilty of crimes against humanity.

== Legacy ==
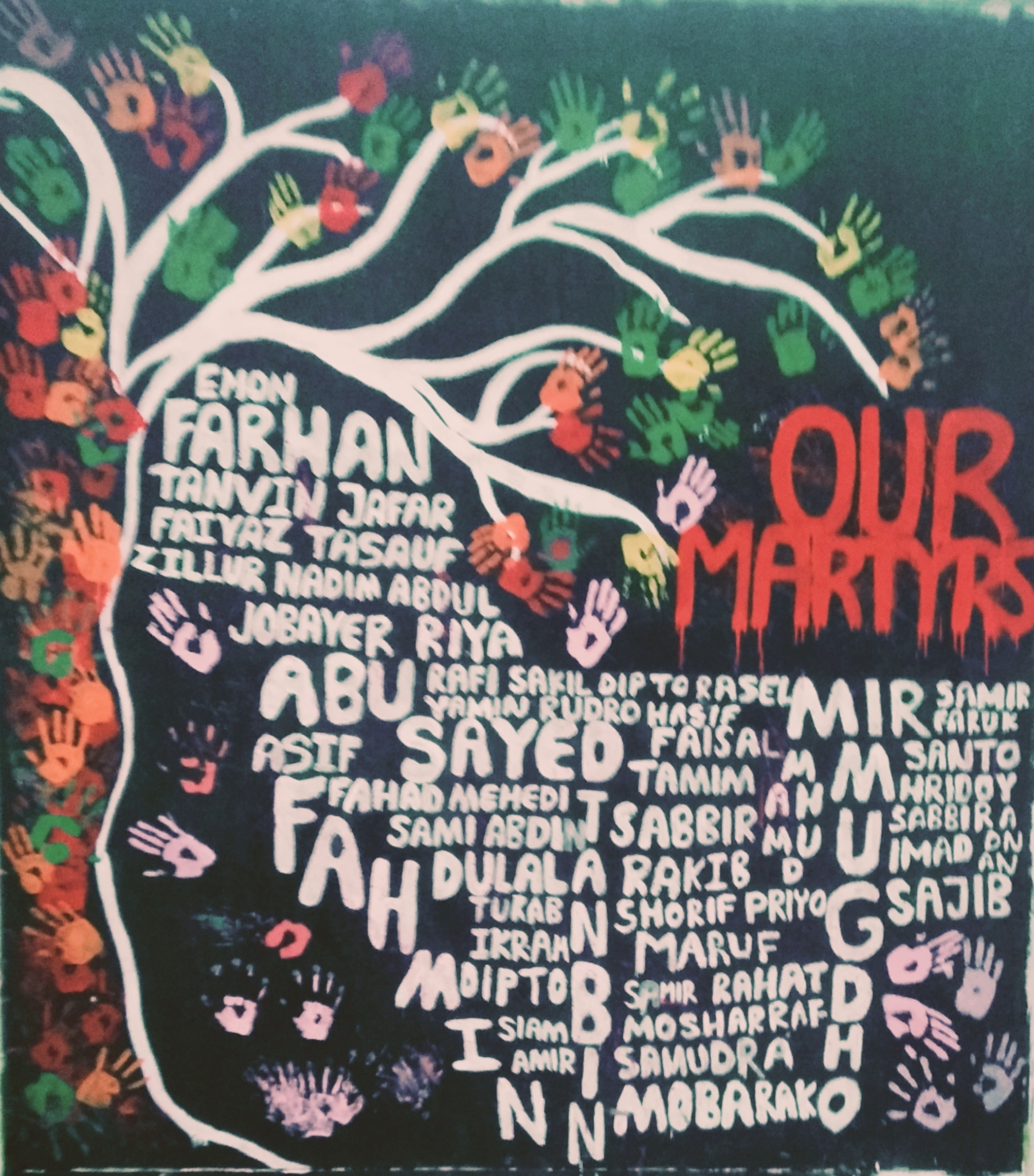
A graffiti with the name of some victims of the massacre

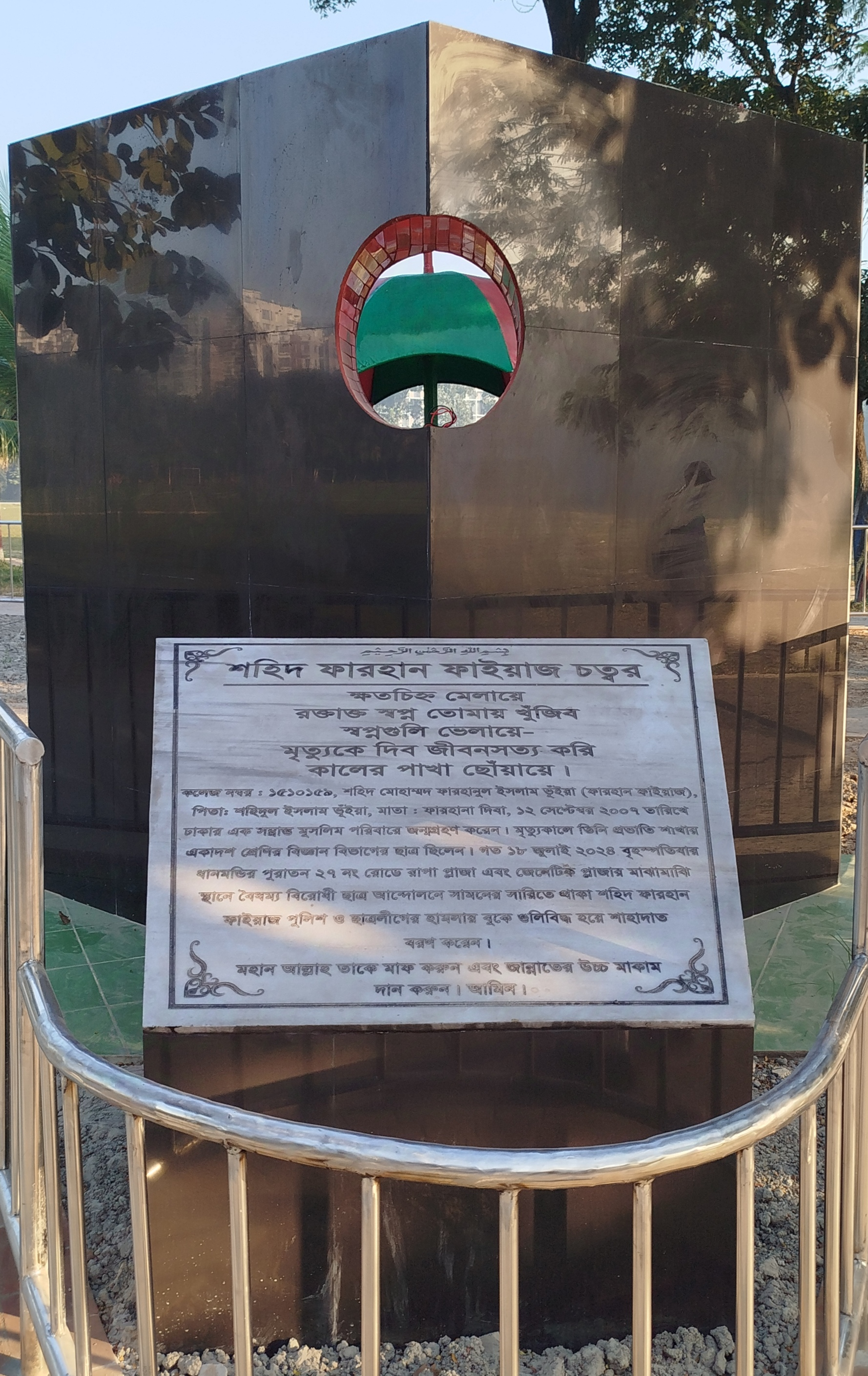
A memorial in remembrance of Farhan Faiyaaz in Dhaka Residential Model College

The Interim government established the July Shaheed Smrity Foundation to offer social and financial support to the victims of the massacre and their families. The day of Hasina's resignation, 5 August 2024 has been widely referred to as "July 36" in remembrance of July massacre. On 23 October 2024 the Chhatra League was banned and designated as a terrorist organisation through the Anti-terrorism act by the interim government for its role in the killing and aiding of the massacre.

== See also ==
- Chankharpul massacre – July massacre in Chankharpul, Dhaka, Bangladesh
- List of massacres in Bangladesh
  - Bangladesh genocide – 1971 genocide of Bengalis in East Pakistan
  - 2013 Shapla Square protests – 2013 mass protest in Bangladesh
- 1989 Tiananmen Square protests and massacre – Student-led demonstrations in China
- 2026 Iran massacre – Mass killing of protesters in Iran
