= Enam Medical College and Hospital =

Private medical school in Bangladesh

Enam Medical College & Hospital
- এনাম মেডিকেল কলেজ ও হাসপাতাল
- Logo of Enam Medical College & Hospital
- Former name: Enam Clinic
- Type: Private medical school
- Established: 2003
- Academic affiliations: University of Dhaka
- Chairman: Md. Enamur Rahman
- Principal: Md. Motahar Hossain Bhuiyan
- Location: 9/3, Parboti Nagar, Thana Road, Savar, Dhaka, Bangladesh; 23.8377°N 90.2528°E
- Campus: Urban
- Language: English
- Website: emcbd.info

Enam Medical College & Hospital (EMCH) (Bengali: এনাম মেডিকেল কলেজ ও হাসপাতাল) is a private medical school in Bangladesh, established in 2003. It is located in Savar, Dhaka. It is affiliated with University of Dhaka as a constituent college.

== History ==
Enam clinic was established in 1989 by Md Enamur Rahman. It was established as a medical college and renamed to Enam Medical College and Hospital in 2003 in Savar, Dhaka District, Bangladesh. 1,700 garment workers from the 2013 Rana Plaza collapse in Savar were treated in Enam Medical College.

== Academics ==
The college offers a five-year course of study, approved by the Bangladesh Medical and Dental Council (BMDC), leading to a Bachelor of Medicine, Bachelor of Surgery (MBBS) degree from Dhaka University. After passing the final professional examination, there is a compulsory one-year internship. The internship is a prerequisite for obtaining registration from the BMDC to practice medicine. The academic calendar runs from January through December. In October 2014, the Ministry of Health and Family Welfare capped admission and tuition fees at private medical colleges at 1,990,000 Bangladeshi taka (US$25,750 as of 2014) total for their five-year courses.

Admission for Bangladeshis to the MBBS programme at all medical colleges in Bangladesh (government and private) is conducted centrally by the Directorate General of Health Services (DGHS). It administers a written multiple choice question exam simultaneously throughout the country. Candidates are admitted based primarily on their score on this test, although grades at Secondary School Certificate (SSC) and Higher Secondary School Certificate (HSC) level also play a part. 50% of seats are reserved for foreign students. Admission for foreign students is based on their SSC and HSC grades. As of July 2014, the college is allowed to admit 100 students annually.
