= 2025 Awami League ban protests =

Procession to ban the Awami League in Dhaka

- Part of the Aftermath of the July Uprising
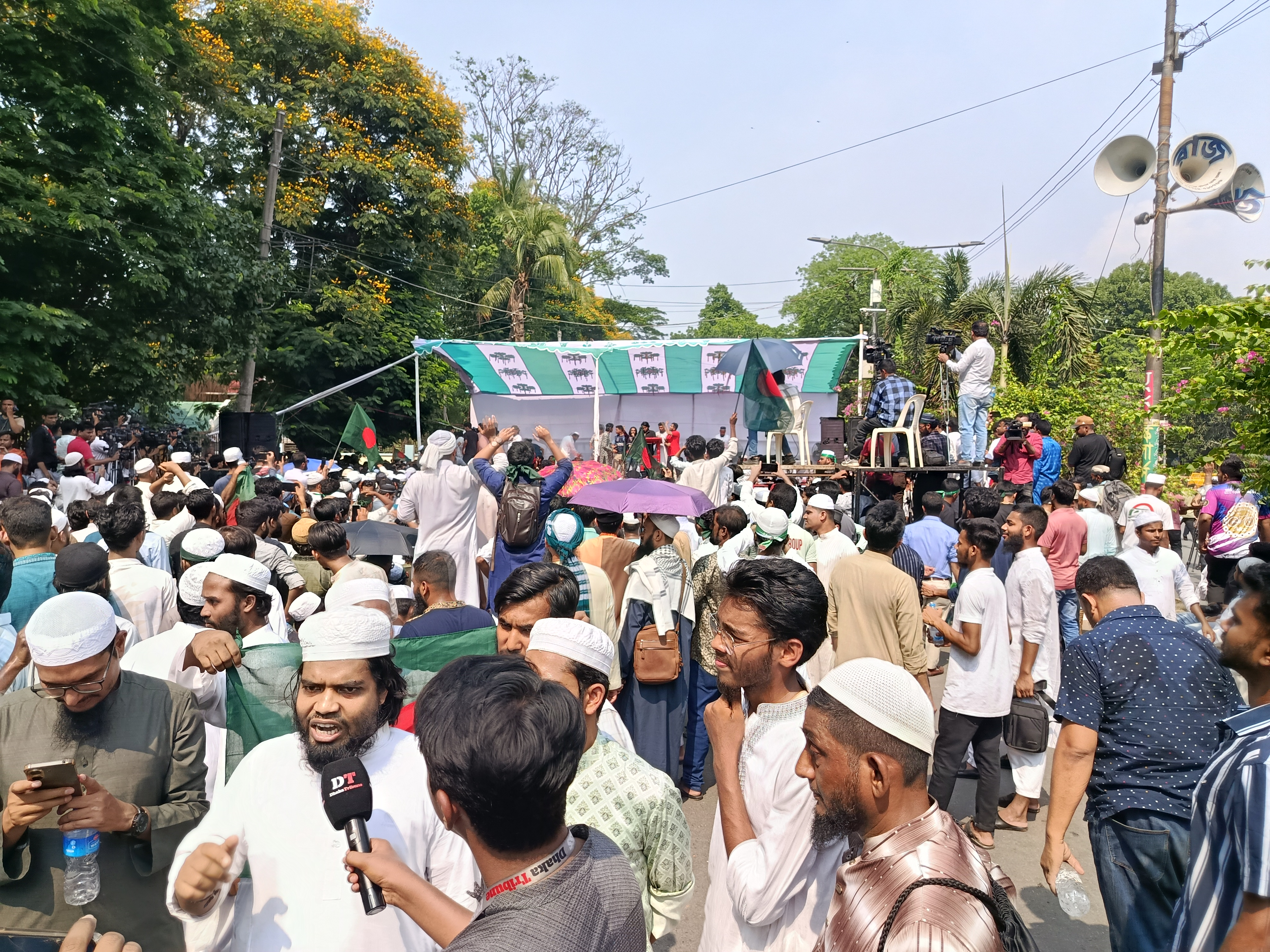
- Protesters on Hair Road near the State Guest House Jamuna in Dhaka on 9 May
- Date: 9 May 2025 – 11 May 2025 (3 days)
- Location: Bangladesh
- Caused by: July Uprising; Distrust in Muhammad Yunus; Exodus of former President Mohammad Abdul Hamid
- Goals: Banning the Bangladesh Awami League as a terrorist and treasonous organization; Inclusion of provisions to try political parties under the "International Crimes (Tribunals) Act, 1973"; Issuance of the July Declaration
- Methods: Protests; Political demonstration; Blockades; Internet activism
- Result: Amendment of the International Crimes (Tribunals) Act on 10 May 2025 to include provisions for prosecution of political parties; Ban on all activities of the Bangladesh Awami League and its affiliated, like-minded, and associate organizations until completion of trial in the International Crimes Tribunal (announced on 12 May 2025); Suspension of the Bangladesh Awami League's registration by the Election Commission of Bangladesh on 12 May 2025

Parties
National Anti-Fascist Unity: National Citizen Party; Bangladesh Jamaat-e-Islami; Gono Odhikar Parishad; Inqilab Moncho; Hefazat-e-Islam Bangladesh; Students Against Discrimination; University students	Interim government: Bangladesh Nationalist Party; Jatiya Party; Krishak Sramik Janata League; Communist Party of Bangladesh

Lead figures
Hasnat Abdullah; Nahid Islam; Shafiqur Rahman; Nurul Haque Nur; Sharif Osman Hadi; Muhibbullah Babunagari; Pinaki Bhattacharya (Note: Online activist)	Muhammad Yunus; Asif Nazrul; Asif Mahmud; Mahfuj Alam; Jahangir Alam Chowdhury; Tarique Rahman; GM Quader; Kader Siddique; Mohammad Shah Alam

The 2025 Awami League ban protests was a nationwide movement which began on 8 May 2025, under the banner of "National Anti-Fascist Unity" led by Hasnat Abdullah, leader of the National Citizen Party, demanding a ban on the Awami League. The movement formally ended on 10 May 2025, when the government announced the suspension of the party's activities until the verdict of the ongoing trial at the International Crimes Tribunal was delivered.

In 2024, the July Uprising brought an end to the authoritarian rule of the Awami League, following which Prime Minister Sheikh Hasina fled to India and went into voluntary exile. On 8 May 2025, the departure of Awami League leader and former President Mohammad Abdul Hamid sparked widespread controversy across the country. During the uprising, he had been accused of ordering the July massacre, and a case had been filed against him. In protest and expressing distrust towards the government, Hasanat Abdullah began a sit-in demonstration in front of the official residence of the Chief Adviser Muhammad Yunus, the Jamuna State Guest House, which gradually evolved into the movement demanding the ban of the Awami League under the banner of National Anti-Fascist Unity.

The movement, which continued from 8 to 11 May, centered on three main demands: banning the Bangladesh Awami League as a terrorist and treasonous organization, amending the "International Crimes (Tribunals) Act, 1973" to include provisions for trying political parties, and issuing the July Declaration. In the midst of the ongoing protests, on 10 May 2025, the government issued a gazette amending the law to allow for punishment of political parties and their affiliated groups. On 12 May 2025, the government officially banned all activities of the Bangladesh Awami League and its affiliated, like-minded, and associate organizations until the conclusion of ongoing trials at the International Crimes Tribunal, and the Bangladesh Election Commission suspended the party's registration.

== Background ==
From 2009 to 2024, the Awami League government, led by Prime Minister Sheikh Hasina, established an authoritarian regime in Bangladesh. During the July Uprising of 2024, the government carried out the July massacre against protesters. Following the success of the uprising, the government was overthrown, and Sheikh Hasina fled to India, where she went into voluntary exile. Afterwards, the Interim government of Muhammad Yunus, which came to power, banned the Awami League's student wing, the Bangladesh Chhatra League. Although there were repeated demands in the post-uprising period to ban the Awami League itself, the government did not act on these calls.

In January 2025, a case was filed against former president and Awami League member Mohammad Abdul Hamid for allegedly ordering the July massacre. On 8 May 2025, he left the country and traveled to Thailand.

Notably, no arrest warrant was issued against the former president. Immigration authorities stated that Hamid had left the country citing medical reasons.

In response, National Citizen Party member Abdul Hannan Masud expressed outrage, claiming that although immigration officers initially barred Abdul Hamid from leaving, officials allowed him to depart following instructions from the President's office. Despite being accused in a major case, Hamid's successful departure sparked national debate. The government termed the event "unexpected" and formed an investigation committee. Intelligence reports later indicated that senior officials were aware of Hamid's departure. As a result, the Superintendent of Police of Kishoreganj and two investigators were temporarily suspended, while an Additional Superintendent of Immigration Police was withdrawn.

In reaction, the Gono Odhikar Parishad issued a 48-hour ultimatum demanding the resignation of Home Affairs Adviser Jahangir Alam Chowdhury. The Inqilab Moncho also called for the resignation of advisers Mahfuj Alam and Asif Mahmud. Chowdhury later announced that he would resign if no action was taken against those involved in Hamid's departure.

Following the incident, Adviser Asif Nazrul stated that public calls for banning the Awami League were growing louder and that the party and its affiliates might soon be outlawed.

On the evening of 8 May, during a flight back to Dhaka, the home affairs adviser was confronted by angry demonstrators at Saidpur Airport, prompting him to assure them that Interpol would be engaged to bring Abdul Hamid back.

Meanwhile, Hasnat Abdullah of the National Citizen Party alleged that India held several meetings with Bangladesh to politically rehabilitate the Awami League, a claim that triggered political controversy. That same night, Abdullah announced a sit-in protest from 10 PM in front of Chief Adviser Muhammad Yunus's official residence, the State Guest House Jamuna, demanding the trial and ban of the Awami League.

According to analysts, the movement emerged due to the lack of effective prosecution for crimes committed during the uprising and the public's unwillingness to accept the Awami League's return to national politics.

There were clear indications that the government was unwilling to ban the party, a stance that aligned with the views of the Bangladesh Nationalist Party. Notably, the Awami League had been banned twice before. Its predecessor, the All-Pakistan Awami League, was first banned in 1958 during martial law imposed by Pakistan's interim President Iskander Mirza, and again on 26 March 1971 during Operation Searchlight before the start of the Bangladesh Liberation War.

Following Hasina's deposition, Shafiqur Rahman, Amir of the Bangladesh Jamaat-e-Islami (which had been banned as a political party by the Hasina administration in 2018 and as an organisation in the peak of the anti-government protests), demanded that the Awami League be banned, but BNP member Ruhul Kabir Rizvi and Jatiya Party (Ershad) leader GM Quader supported the participation of Awami League in the polls. Bangladesh Army chief Waker-Uz-Zaman had reportedly stated that the participation of a refined Awami League led by leaders with clean image like Shirin Sharmin Chaudhury, Sheikh Fazle Noor Taposh and Saber Hossain Chowdhury is necessary to ensure that the elections are "free, fair & inclusive". However, student agitators placed within the interim government like Mahfuj Alam bitterly opposed the participation of the Awami League in the polls. Nahid Islam also voiced his opposition to participation of the Awami League in the polls, unless its leaders are put on trial for the July massacre. He stated that any attempt to relaunch the so-called refined Awami League in the elections amounts to foreign interference. A petition demanding a ban on the Awami League and its associates of the Grand Alliance filed by the student agitators had been turned down by the Appellate Division.

== History ==
=== Protest Program (8–9 May) ===
On the night of 8 May 2025, at 10 PM, a sit-in and protest began in front of the Jamuna Building. The protest was joined by the National Citizen Party, Bangladesh Democratic Students' Council, July Unity, and Inqilab Moncho.

In addition to party activists, non-political individuals and madrasa students also participated in the protest march in front of the Jamuna Building, which was called by Hasnat Abdullah under the initiative of the National Citizen Party. Around midnight on 9 May, in a speech delivered during the protest, Hasnat Abdullah stated that the government had failed to understand the people's demands, which led to the rise of the movement. He declared that the protest would continue until the demands were met. Law enforcement remained on alert at the protest site.

Protesters chanted slogans such as,

"No servitude but streets, streets, streets", "Not power but people, people, people", "Punish the League", "Light it up, light the fire" and "Let Shapla's weapon roar once more".

The protest intensified after Bangladesh Jamaat-e-Islami and its student organization, Bangladesh Islami Chhatra Shibir, joined. Protesters at the sit-in in front of the Jamuna Building did not face any obstacles. The protest was announced suddenly, and Romna police's DC Masud Alam was seen arriving at the Jamuna site directly from a tennis match, still wearing his tennis jersey.

At 1 AM, National Citizen Party convener Nahid Islam and member-secretary Akhter Hossain joined the program along with other leaders. Around the same time, students from Jahangirnagar University blocked the Dhaka–Aricha Highway. Between 1:30 AM and 3:00 AM, in Chattogram, protests and road blockades were organized at the Chowkbazar and New Market intersections by the Students Against Discrimination and the National Citizen Party. After Friday prayers, a protest march and brief rally were held in Boalkhali of Chattogram District.

At the same time, a rally was organized in front of InterContinental Dhaka. In the afternoon, a protest march was held in Moulvibazar with the same demand. Students of University of Rajshahi also organized a protest in the city demanding the ban of Bangladesh Awami League.

Later in the afternoon, as part of the movement, Gono Odhikar Parishad blocked Paltan intersection in Dhaka. In support of the movement, multiple political parties organized processions in Cumilla and held a sit-in in front of the deputy commissioner's office.

In the afternoon, students of Islamic University, Bangladesh blocked the Khulna–Kushtia Highway for about an hour demanding the banning of the Bangladesh Awami League. In Noakhali, under the initiative of July Unity, various political and student organizations joined a one-hour protest march and sit-in.

During the movement, protests were organized in Sylhet, Khulna, Natore, Kishoreganj, and Joypurhat by the National Citizen Party, Students Against Discrimination, Bangladesh Islami Chhatra Shibir, and Inqilab Moncho. In Lakshmipur, the protest was joined by Bangladesh Jamaat-e-Islami, Bangladesh Islami Chhatra Shibir, and the public demanding the banning of Bangladesh Awami League.

In the afternoon, a protest march was organized in Habiganj by the National Citizen Party and Students Against Discrimination. At 5:30 PM, a protest program was conducted by blocking CDA Avenue in Chattogram, demanding the banning of the Bangladesh Awami League. In Narail, public protesters organized a march and sit-in on the Dhaka–Narail road in the afternoon.

=== Blockade Activities (9–10 May) ===
At 2:45 PM on 9 May 2025, members of various political parties and platforms attended a rally held in Dhaka. During the rally, around 4:30 PM, Hasnat Abdullah announced a blockade program at Shahbag intersection, prompting the protesters to move from InterContinental Dhaka to Shahbag.

Members of various Islamist and political organizations participated in the Shahbag blockade in separate groups, where Muhammad Jasimuddin Rahmani and his supporters were also seen. Nahid Islam warned the government that unless the Bangladesh Awami League was swiftly banned, a program similar to the March to Dhaka would be launched. He also confirmed that roads in various parts of Dhaka were blocked.

Due to the sit-in at Shahbag from the afternoon, traffic movement was halted, causing severe congestion in the city. Rord in Mirpur, Badda, and Rampura were also blocked. On the same day at 4 PM, the political platform United People's Bangladesh, based on the student-people uprising, was formally launched and later joined the sit-in at Shahbagh.

In the evening, in Uttara, activists of the student-people uprising blocked the Airport Road, Dhaka and staged protests under the call of July Revolutionary Alliance. Later that night, under the leadership of the Students Against Discrimination, a protest march and rally were held in support of the movement in Kurigram.

At around 9:30 PM, protesters demonstrated and blocked the Dhaka–Aricha Highway in Savar, showing solidarity with the demand to ban the Bangladesh Awami League. Although various political parties and organizations took part in the movement, the Bangladesh Nationalist Party (BNP) remained absent and refrained from taking a stance on banning the Awami League. Protesters questioned this and attempted to bring the BNP into the movement.

At 11 PM, Hasnat Abdullah announced the next day's program at Shahbag, urging a public gathering at 3 PM at all blockade points, including Shahbagh. He presented three demands to the government: issuing the July Declaration, designating Awami League as a terrorist organization and banning all its affiliates, and banning the party collectively through the International Crimes Tribunal (Bangladesh).

At 4 AM on 10 May 2025, Hasnat Abdullah posted on Facebook, urging protesters not to block roads anywhere except Shahbag. He reiterated this instruction in another early morning Facebook post.

From 11 AM, protesters blocked the Dhaka–Chittagong Highway at Shonir Akhra in Dhaka for about 90 minutes, demanding a notification banning the Bangladesh Awami League. Leaders and activists from various political parties took part in the protest.

At the same time, the National Citizen Party and Students Against Discrimination held a protest at the roundabout of Section 10 in Mirpur, Dhaka. At 11:30 AM, protesters in Pakundia of Kishoreganj District blocked the Kishoreganj–Pakundia Highway.

On the afternoon of 10 May 2025, the Dhaka Metropolitan Police issued a public notice banning rallies, assemblies, gatherings, and processions indefinitely in the areas surrounding the official residence of the Chief Adviser and the Bangladesh Secretariat.

At 2 PM, Hasnat Abdullah posted on Facebook claiming that there were attempts to divide the movement for negative political motives. He stated that the movement was not the initiative of any single political party and declared that it would henceforth be conducted under the banner of "National Unity Against Fascism."

At 3 PM, a mass gathering began at Shahbag, Dhaka. In his speech, Hasnat Abdullah urged the protesters to continue the movement even if he had to withdraw due to external pressure or health issues. The Islami Andolan Bangladesh called for a resolution on the Awami League issue at the Advisory Council meeting scheduled for that day.

In the afternoon, protesters held a sit-in and rally in Sylhet on the Zindabazar–Chowhatta road. Despite Hasnat Abdullah's request, protesters were seen blocking roads with barricades in Shyamoli, Dhaka, causing hardship to commuters.

At 4:30 PM, protesters blocked the road at Shishumela intersection on Mirpur Road in Dhaka, resulting in heavy traffic congestion. As the area is near several hospitals, patients were seen walking along the road.

At 4 PM, protesters held a blockade at Shibbari intersection in Khulna. Meanwhile, protests and rallies were also held at Talaimari and Alupatti intersections in Rajshahi.

=== Ultimatum (10–12 May) ===
On the evening of 10 May 2025, during a public gathering held at Shahbag in Dhaka, Hasnat Abdullah issued a one-hour ultimatum to the government, warning that if the Bangladesh Awami League was not banned within that hour, protesters would blockade the road from InterContinental Dhaka to Banglamotor. Around one and a half hours later, the protesters at Shahbagh split into several groups, with one group gathering at the intersection in front of InterContinental Dhaka. That same evening, at 8 PM, the government announced an emergency meeting of the Advisory Council. Protesters at Shahbagh awaited news of the ban on Bangladesh Awami League following the meeting. It was reported that the meeting would decide on banning the party.

Meanwhile, at 9 PM, the acting chairman of the Bangladesh Nationalist Party, Tarique Rahman, called for a meeting of the party's highest policymaking forum to discuss the ongoing political situation in Bangladesh. After the one-hour ultimatum expired with no decision from the government, protesters began a march towards the Jamuna building. Law enforcement personnel were stationed near the InterContinental Hotel to block their path.

Following the emergency meeting, advisor Asif Nazrul stated in a press briefing that the Advisory Council had approved an amendment to the International Crimes Tribunal Act, allowing punishment of any political party. Consequently, the council decided to ban the activities of the Bangladesh Awami League until trials of its members are concluded, and a gazette notification would be published on 12 May. Upon this announcement, a celebratory procession was held in Faridpur led by the Students Against Discrimination.

Similar celebrations were held at University of Chittagong at night. In New York, the Students Against Discrimination organized a sweet distribution and celebration event in reaction to the ban. A midnight celebration also took place in Uttara on 11 May.

Protesters at Shahbag expressed joy, although some were dissatisfied as the government did not issue a permanent ban. Hasnat Abdullah instructed protesters to continue their movement until a final statement from the government was announced. Protesters rejected the government's decision and accused it of not fulfilling their core demand. Consequently, a meeting was held at the Jamuna building between top government policymakers and leaders such as Hasnat Abdullah of the National Citizen Party, Ali Ahsan Zunaid of Up Bangladesh, and Osman Hadi of Inqilab Moncho. After the meeting, Hasnat Abdullah addressed a midnight press conference, expressing satisfaction with the government's stance and urging protesters to return home.

On the morning of 11 May, Chief Election Commissioner A. M. M. Nasir Uddin stated that the Election Commission would convene a meeting to decide on the party's registration once the gazette notification regarding the Awami League ban was issued. On the same day, injured activists from the student uprising and dissatisfied relatives of the injured or killed continued their protest at Shahbagh. They demanded a permanent ban on Bangladesh Awami League, enactment of a July Protection Law, and immediate announcement of the July Declaration. In the afternoon, in front of the Madhu's Canteen at Dhaka University, Inqilab Moncho proposed three additional demands: a separate tribunal for trying parties and individuals, a commission to ensure restitution for innocent Awami League workers, and publication of the July Declaration by 5 August 2025. At 10 PM, the injured activists and bereaved families of the uprising withdrew their protest. On 12 May 2025, Sarjis Alam of the National Citizen Party reminded the government via a Facebook post that a gazette on the ban of Bangladesh Awami League was due that day and gave the interim authority a five-hour deadline.

== Outcome ==
On 12 May 2025, the government issued a gazette notification banning all activities of the Awami League and its affiliated organizations. In continuation of this, on 12 May 2025, the Election Commission of Bangladesh suspended the registration of the Awami League as a party.

== Controversy ==
A slogan was heard in front of the InterContinental Dhaka by a group of protestors "No place for Awami League in Ghulam Azam's Bengal". Some protesters allegedly attempted to obstruct the singing of national anthem during the demonstration. NCP later issued a statement condemning these incidents and called for clarifying political position of the collaborators of 1971 genocide. Bangladesh Islami Chhatra Shibir secretary Nurul Islam Saddam condemned the disruption.

== Reactions ==
Following the Awami League's ban, it gained domestic and foreign praise and opposition.

Despite BNP's earlier opposition to ban Awami League. BNP general secretary Mirza Fakhrul Islam Alamgir supported the decision. In a statement issued quoted,

We are pleased that the interim government, albeit delayed, has finally taken the step to halt the activities of the fascist Awami League and its affiliated bodies to ensure swift and unhindered prosecution of those involved in crimes against humanity.

- India opposed the ban, expressing their concern over the decision. External affairs ministry spokesperson Randhir Jaiswal said that,

India is "concerned at the curtailment of democratic freedom and of shrinking political space in Bangladesh".

- The chief adviser's press secretary, Shafiqul Alam, reiterated that,

The ban on the activities of the AL is necessary to protect national security and sovereignty, ensure the safety of July Uprising activists and safeguard plaintiffs and witnesses of the International Crimes Tribunal.
