= July Declaration =

Official recognizing document of the July Uprising of Bangladesh

July Declaration জুলাই ঘোষণাপত্র
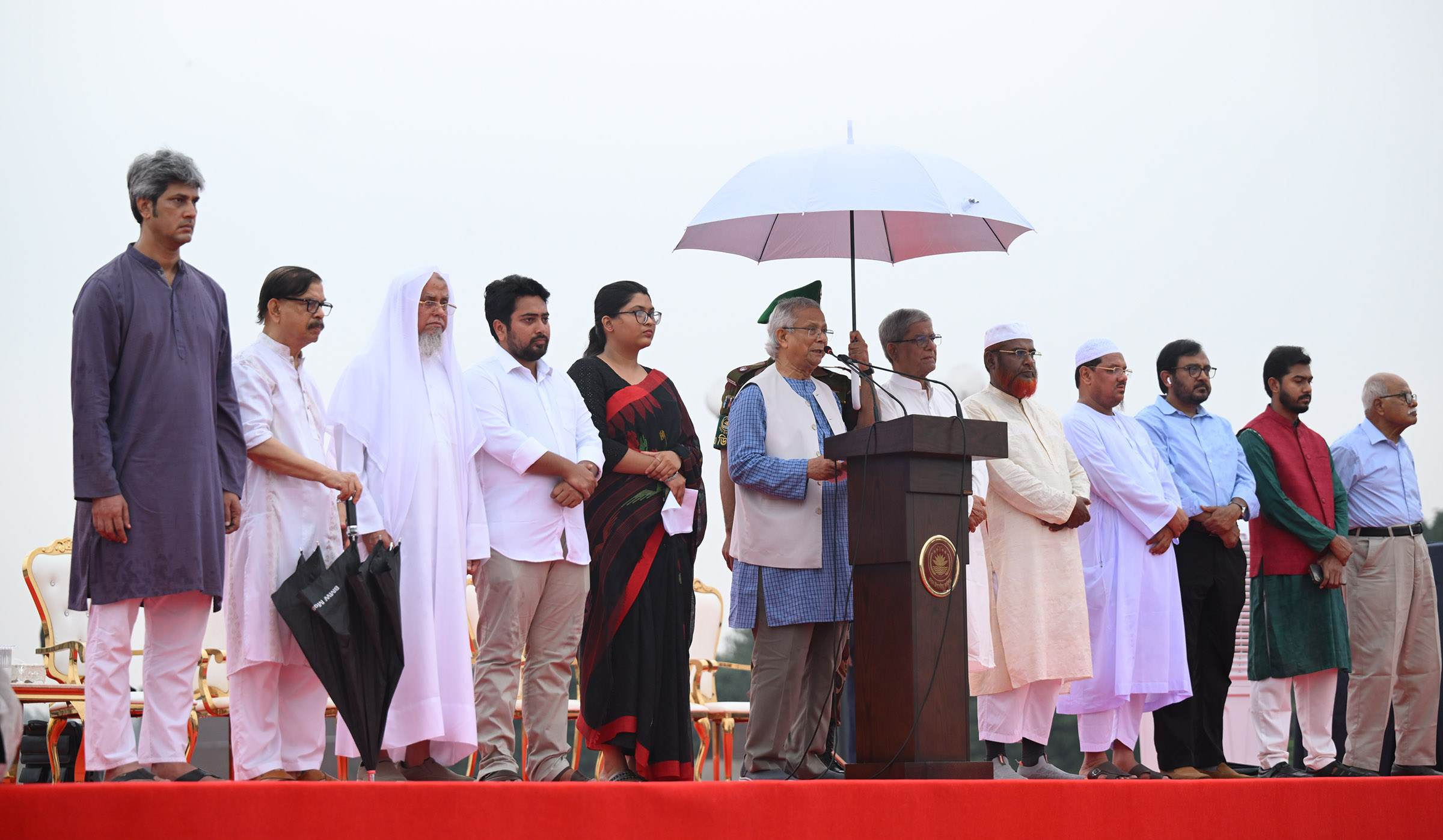
- Chief adviser and political leaders during the proclamation of the July Declaration
- Created: 5 August 2025
- Location: South Plaza of the Jatiya Sangsad Bhaban; Sher-e-Bangla Nagar, Dhaka, Bangladesh
- Author: Muhammad Yunus
- Purpose: Constitutional recognition of the July Uprising; Commitment to democratic reforms, institutional restructuring, and transition to credible elections

The July Declaration (Bengali: জুলাই ঘোষণাপত্র) is the official recognizing document of the July Uprising in Bangladesh. It was formally announced by Chief Adviser Muhammad Yunus prior to 5 August 2025, marking the first anniversary of the uprising. The declaration, which was prepared under strict confidentiality, outlined 28 points addressing political, constitutional and governance issues.

The document called for constitutional restructuring. According to the document, the declaration would be considered effective retroactively from 5 August 2024. On the day of the first anniversary, 5 August 2025, Muhammad Yunus read out the declaration in front of the Jatiya Sangsad Bhaban.

== History ==
Following the fall of the Awami League government amid the July Uprising, the Students Against Discrimination and the Jatiya Nagorik Committee announced plans to publish a political declaration on the July Uprising. On 29 December 2024, they formally declared its release, scheduling it for 31 December. During this announcement, Hasnat Abdullah stated that the proclamation aimed to render the Awami League obsolete — likening it to the Nazi regime — and to symbolically "bury" the 1972 Constitution. Although the government initially remained uninvolved, it later joined the initiative, and discussions began between political parties and reform commissions over governance-related proposals. Simultaneously, efforts progressed on drafting both the July Declaration and the July Charter.

In early July 2025, a preliminary version of the declaration was prepared, and feedback was sought from the Bangladesh Nationalist Party (BNP), the Bangladesh Jamaat-e-Islami, and the National Citizen Party (NCP). By 1 August, two student advisers affiliated with the government confirmed that the final version would be issued before 5 August.

On 5 August, Muhammad Yunus read out the declaration at the South Plaza of the Jatiya Sangsad Bhaban.

== Commitments ==
The declaration contained 28 commitments, which began by contextualising the ongoing struggle for liberal democracy in Bangladesh starting with the declaration of independence in 1971, and the liberation war, stating that the Awami League had failed to live up to those ideals. Despite the reinstitution of parliamentary democracy in 1990, the 1/11 political intervention led to democratic backsliding and human rights violations. It details the alleged crimes of Sheikh Hasina, including unlawful imprisonment and extrajudicial killings, as well as describing the 2014, 2018, and 2024 elections as "farcical".

The commitments describe the quota reform movement that led to July massacre, and ultimately got the Resignation of Sheikh Hasina and flight from the country. It then outlines the goals of the interim government that was subsequently established, which includes building "a society free from fascism, inequality, and corruption" and seeking retribution for the crimes of the previous government. It also proscribes that those who died in the uprising be martyred and calls for a free and fair election and for the next government to combat its contribution to climate change.

== Context ==
July Declaration
BISMILLAH-AR-RAHMAN-AR-RAHIM
In the name of Allah, the Beneficient, the Merciful
In the name of the Creator, the Merciful.
1. Whereas, in the historical continuity of anti-colonial resistance, the people of this land stood up against the deprivation and exploitation by Pakistan's autocratic rulers for 23 years and, in response to indiscriminate genocide, launched a mass resistance that culminated in the declaration of independence on 26 March 1971, leading to the establishment of the sovereign state of Bangladesh through a bloody Liberation War;
2. Whereas, through long-standing struggles, the people of Bangladesh made the ultimate sacrifice to realize their aspirations for a liberal democratic state based on equality, human dignity, and social justice as stated in the Declaration of Independence;
3. Whereas, due to the structural weaknesses, procedural flaws, and misuse of the Constitution of 1972, the post-independence Awami League government failed to fulfill the people's aspirations from the Liberation War, thereby undermining democracy and the effectiveness of state institutions;
4. Whereas, the Awami League government abandoned democratic governance and instituted a one-party rule through BAKSAL, suppressing freedom of expression and judicial independence, which triggered the Sipahi-Janata revolution on 7 November 1975 and paved the way for the restoration of multiparty democracy and judicial freedom;
5. Whereas, following nine years of relentless student and public movements against military autocracy in the 1980s, the mass uprising of 1990 led to the reinstatement of parliamentary democracy in 1991;
6. Whereas, due to domestic and international conspiracies disrupting the democratic process of government change, the 1/11 political intervention paved the way for Sheikh Hasina’s monopolization of power and emergence of fascist rule;
7. Whereas, over the past sixteen years, constitutional amendments were made illegally and undemocratically with the intent of establishing a one-party regime and consolidating absolute power;
8. Whereas, under Sheikh Hasina’s Awami League government, misrule, enforced disappearances, extrajudicial killings, suppression of free expression, and constitutional manipulations destroyed state and democratic institutions;
9. Whereas, under Sheikh Hasina’s authoritarian leadership, a deeply anti-people and human rights–violating force gave Bangladesh a fascist, mafia-like, and failed state image on the global stage;
10. Whereas, under the guise of development, massive corruption, bank looting, money laundering, and destruction of economic institutions under the Awami League government crippled Bangladesh’s economic potential and endangered its environment, biodiversity, and climate resilience;
11. Whereas, over the past sixteen years, people from all walks of life—including political parties, student and labor organizations—have endured imprisonment, violence, disappearances, and killings while engaging in continuous democratic resistance against the fascist regime;
12. Whereas, the people’s legitimate struggle against foreign dominance and exploitation was brutally repressed by the Awami League government acting as a puppet of external forces;
13. Whereas, to retain power illegally, the Awami League government deprived the people of their voting rights and representation through three farcical national elections (2014, 2018, and 2024);
14. Whereas, political dissenters, students, and youth were subjected to severe repression, and discriminatory recruitment practices in government jobs led to intense frustration among students and job seekers;
15. Whereas, prolonged oppression of opposition forces generated mass public resentment and led to persistent anti-fascist struggles through all legitimate means;
16. Whereas, during the movement Students Against Discrimination is demanding the abolition of quota-based inequality and eradication of corruption, the government responded with brutal repression and crimes against humanity, which sparked widespread uprisings across the country;
17. Whereas, people from all sectors of society joined the student uprising—including political, religious, social, cultural, professional, and labor organizations—and the Awami League's fascist forces responded by massacring nearly a thousand people, including women and children, causing countless injuries and permanent disabilities, until members of the armed forces ultimately sided with the people’s democratic movement;
18. Whereas, in pursuit of the downfall of the illegal Sheikh Hasina regime and the establishment of a new political order, the people launched a non-cooperation movement at the call of the Students Against Discrimination, culminating in a long march to Dhaka and a march toward Ganabhaban, compelling Sheikh Hasina to resign and flee the country on 5 August 2024;
19. Whereas, the people’s assertion of sovereignty through this mass uprising is both politically and legally justified and recognized under international law;
20. Whereas, in response to public demand, the illegitimate Twelfth National Parliament was dissolved and, under Article 106 of the Constitution and the opinion of the Supreme Court, an interim government was formed on 8 August 2024 led by Professor Muhammad Yunus;
21. Whereas, the people's uprising and the student movement expressed a desire to build a society free from fascism, inequality, and corruption;
22. Whereas, the people of Bangladesh now seek to ensure good governance, fair elections, the rule of law, and socio-economic justice through democratic reforms of the Constitution and all state institutions;
23. Whereas, the people demand justice for all enforced disappearances, killings, massacres, crimes against humanity, and plundering of state resources committed by the fascist Awami League government during the sixteen-year-long struggle and the 2024 uprising;
24. Whereas, the people of Bangladesh declare all martyrs of the July uprising as national heroes and express their intent to provide legal protection to injured fighters and participating students and citizens;
25. Whereas, the people intend to hold a free, fair, and inclusive national election in due time, following constitutional reforms, to fulfill the expectations of the people—especially the youth—for a democratic state based on justice, human rights, equality, and integrity;
26. Whereas, the people expect the implementation of an inclusive, environmentally and climate-resilient development strategy that safeguards the rights of present and future generations;
27. Whereas, the people call for official recognition of the 2024 student-led mass uprising and inclusion of this declaration in the annex of the Constitution amended by the next elected government;
28. Therefore, this declaration is adopted on 5 August 2024 as an embodiment of the will of the victorious people of Bangladesh following the people's uprising.

== Reactions ==
While most of the political parties welcomed July Charter, some opposed it. Islamist groups like Jamaat-e-Islami & Hefazat-e-Islam expressed dismay for not including the unlawful arrests, killing and torture of Islamic scholars and madrasa students during the Awami League regime, including the Shapla Square massacre. Akhter Hossain, secretary of the NCP, described the draft as "immature." Nurul Haque Nur, president of the Gono Odhikar Parishad, criticized the government's approach for excluding other stakeholders, alleging that sending the draft only to three parties was discriminatory and demanding a justification for this selective engagement. Leftist groups like the Communist Party of Bangladesh also criticised the draft for not addressing enough problems whose solutions may compensate for the incompleteness of the Constitution.

British journalist David Bergman questioned the neutrality of the document, citing that most of the parts of the declaration only provided the negative and authoritarian side of the Awami League regime, without recognizing the positive sides of the regime such as economic growth, improvement in female education, infrastructural development, contributions to the climate change etc. He also accused for errors & negations related to the post-independence history of Bangladesh in the document. Although, he also praised the document for honouring the Liberation War of Bangladesh as well as for describing an accurate scenario of the revolution, state killings and public desires, he argued that the inclusion of Yunus's name in such document damaged his positive image.

== See also ==
- Proclamation of Bangladeshi Independence
