= Jatiya Chhatra Shakti =

Student political organisation in Bangladesh

Jatiya Chhatra Shakti জাতীয় ছাত্র শক্তি
- President: Abu Baker Majumder
- Secretary General: Tahmid Al Mudassir Chowdhury
- Founded: 26 February 2025; 20 months ago
- Split from: Students Against Discrimination
- Preceded by: Gonotantrik Chhatra Shakti (de facto)
- Headquarters: Rupayan Trade Center, 114 Kazi Nazrul Islam Avenue, Banglamotor, Dhaka, Bangladesh
- Colours: Green
- National affiliation: National Citizen Party
- Slogan: Education, Unity, Liberation

Flag
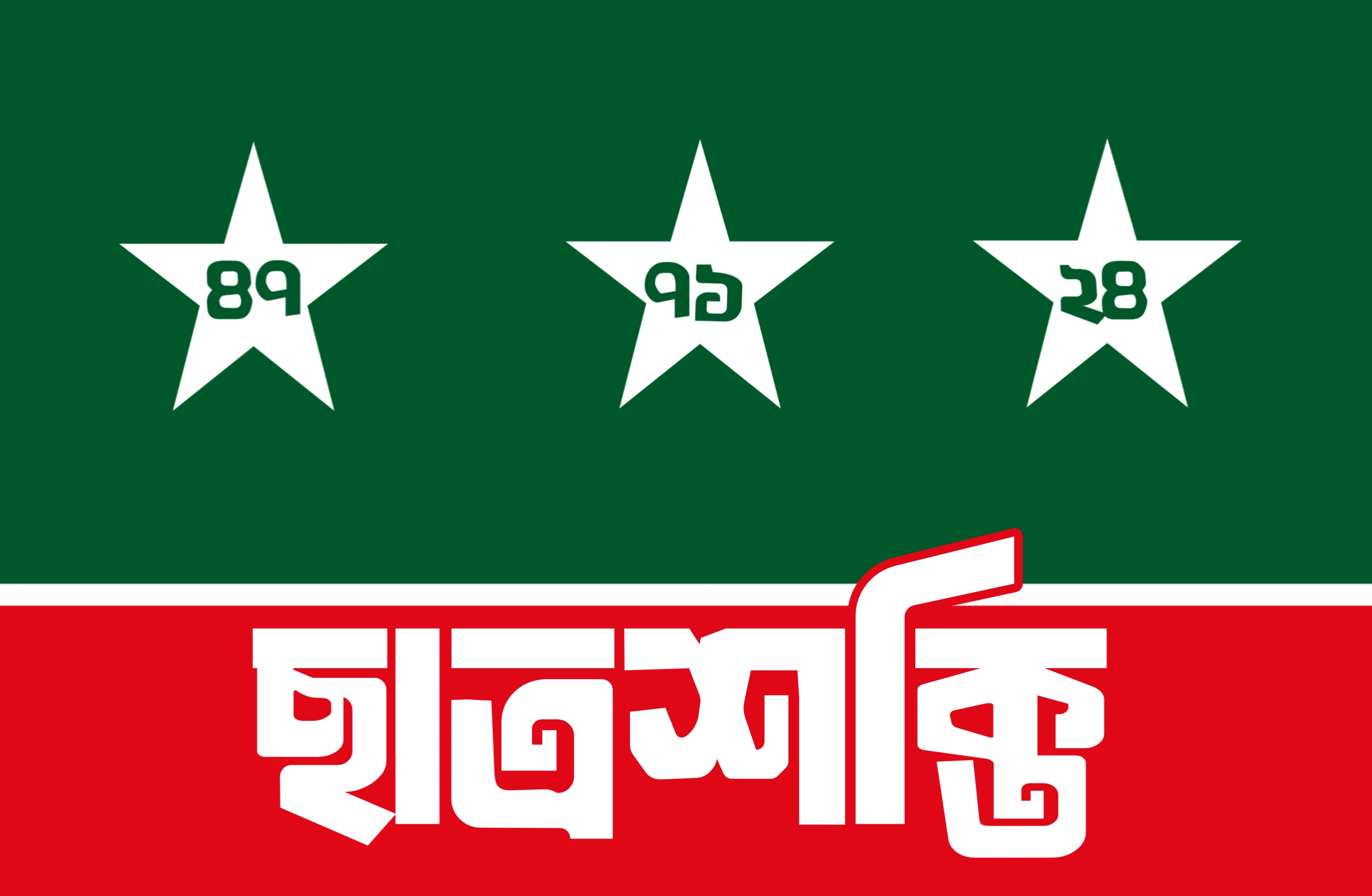

Jatiya Chhatra Shakti (Bengali: জাতীয় ছাত্রশক্তি, lit. 'National Students' Force') is a student organisation in Bangladesh. It was launched as Bangladesh Ganatantrik Chhatra Sangsad (Bengali: বাংলাদেশ গণতান্ত্রিক ছাত্রসংসদ, lit. 'Bangladesh Democratic Students' Council') on 26 February 2025. Today, it's the student wing of the National Citizen Party (NCP).

== History ==
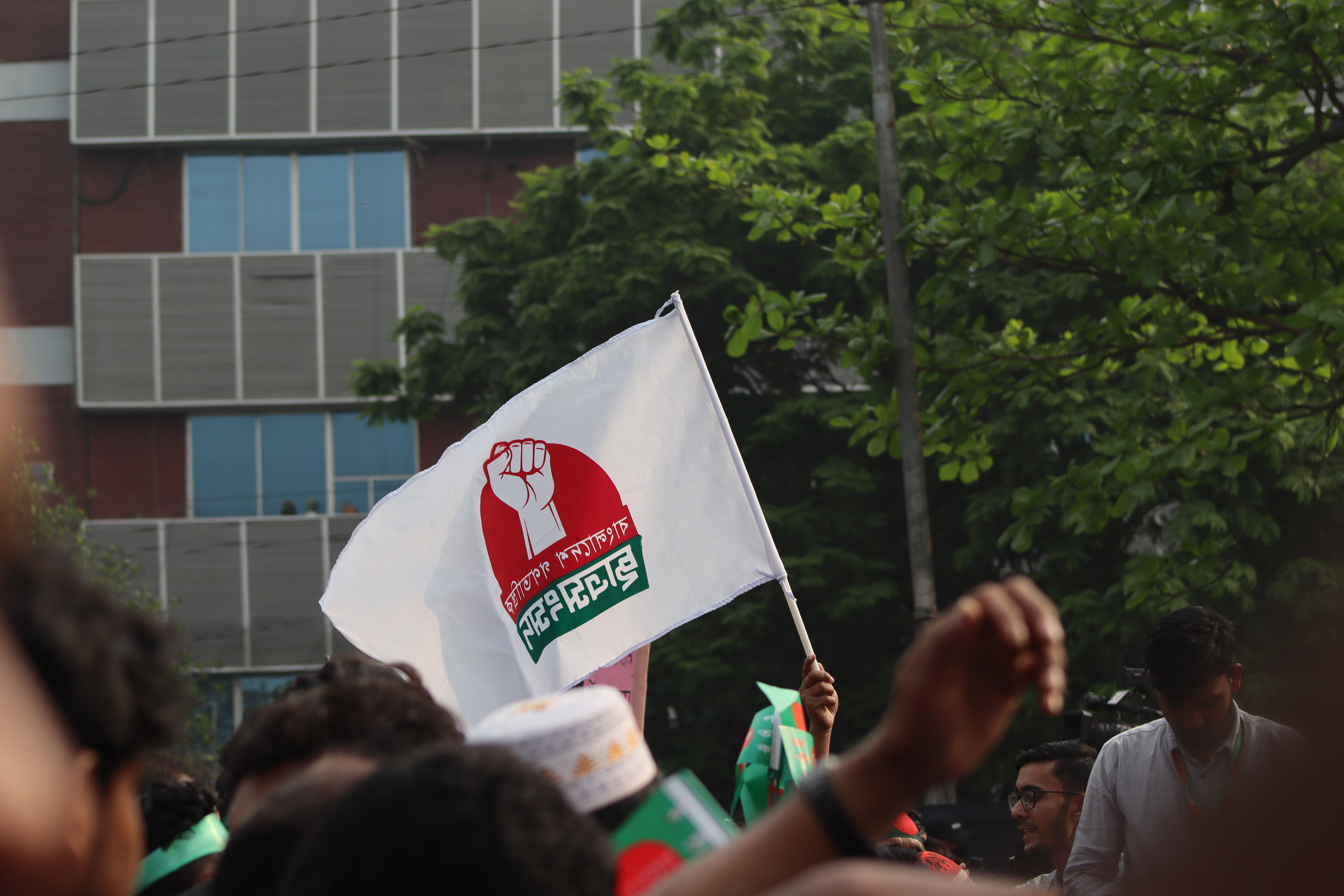
Bangladesh Ganatantrik Chhatra Sangsad flag waving in the launching ceremony of National Citizen Party

After Students Against Discrimination and Jatiya Nagorik Committee started to organise a new student-led political party, a separate student organisation was planned as the party's student wing. It was said that the student organisation could be formed 3–5 days before the formation of the new party. However, on 17 February, former coordinators of the Students Against Discrimination, Abdul Kader and Abu Baker Mazumder, announced at a press conference held at the Madhur Canteen of Dhaka University that the student organisation would be independent of any political party. Abdul Kader, former central coordinator of the organisation, stated that upon hearing the news of the new political party, they felt the need to form a student organisation that would be able to fill the vacuum in student politics caused by the absence of Chhatra League. According to Kader, if any political party offers or works in line with the spirit of July Uprising, the organisation will support that party. Although the student organisation is said to be independent from the party, there are ideological similarities between the two and it is believed that the new student organisation could function as the student wing of the party.

According to a report of Desh Rupantor on 23 February, the new student organisation was said to have debuted the next day at Madhur Canteen with the name Biplobi Chhatra Shakti (lit. 'Revolutionary Student Power') with a 251-member committee. The report also stated that only students aged under-28 would be allowed to join the organisation, whose financial needs would be met through contributions from party members. It was also reported that the organisation would follow a democratic method of electing leaders from the grassroots. Abdul Kader stated that anyone who wanted to hold any position in the new student organisation would have to leave Students Against Discrimination.

=== Founding as Bangladesh Ganatantrik Chhatra Sangsad (2025) ===
On 26 February 2025, the new student organisation with the name Bangladesh Ganatantrik Chhatra Sangsad was formally established with Mazumder as its convener, Zahid Ahsan as the member secretary, Tahmid Al Mudassir as the chief organiser, and Ashrefa Khatun as the spokesperson.

On the day of its launch, students from various private universities, including North South University, East West University, and BRAC University, alleged discrimination in securing leadership positions within the new student organisation. This led to a clash between two factions over the issue in Madhur Canteen at campus of University of Dhaka and private university students blocked Shahbagh-bound lane in Bangla Motor, Dhaka near office of Students Against Discrimination. 10 people were injured in the clashes.

On the next day, a 205-member full central committee of Chhatra Sangsad was announced. Senior Joint Member Secretary Rifat Rashid resigned that day.

=== Renaming and NCP affiliation (October 2025) ===
On 23 October 2025, the organization renamed itself as "Jatiya Chhatra Shakti" and officially became affiliated with the National Citizen Party (NCP). The renaming came after the organisation performed poorly in the Dhaka University Central Students' Union (DUCSU) election held on 9 September 2025, following which internal discussions led the NCP to propose a formal name change and open affiliation with the party.

=== First council and transition to full committee (November 2025) ===
Following the renaming, a first council of Jatiya Chhatra Shakti was convened, at which the organisation transitioned from its founding convening committee structure to a full central committee. In keeping with the convention under which the Convener of the founding committee assumes the presidency and the Member Secretary assumes the secretary-generalship upon the first council, Abu Baker Majumder became "President" and Zahid Ahsan became "General Secretary". The organisation's central committee currently comprises 122 members, with branch committees established across several educational institutions.

== Leadership ==
=== Founding convening committee (26 February 2025) ===
Position	Name
Convener	Abu Baker Majumder
Member Secretary	Zahid Ahsan
Chief Organiser	Tahmid Al Mudassir
Spokesperson	Ashrefa Khatun
Senior Joint Member Secretary	Rifat Rashid (resigned 27 February 2025)

=== Post-first-council central committee (from November 2025) ===
Position	Name
President	Zahid Ahsan
General Secretary	Abu Baker Majumder

=== List of presidents ===
#	Name	Tenure	Notes
1	Zahid Ahsan	23 October 2025 – 2 September 2026	confirmed as president following the first council in November 2025 Resigned in September 2026.

=== List of general secretaries / member secretaries ===
#	Name	Role	Tenure	Notes
1	Zahid Ahsan	Member Secretary	26 February 2025 – October 2025	Held the role of Member Secretary during the founding convening committee phase under the name Bangladesh Ganatantrik Chhatra Sangsad
2	Abu Baker Majumder	General Secretary	November 2025 – present	Elevated to General Secretary at the first council following the organisation's renaming and NCP affiliation

== See also ==
- National Citizen Party
- Jatiya Jubo Shakti
- Students Against Discrimination
- Gonotantrik Chhatra Shakti
- July Uprising
- Bangladesh Chhatra League
