= Gonotantrik Chhatra Shakti =

Student organization in Bangladesh

Ganotantrik Chhatra Shakti গণতান্ত্রিক ছাত্রশক্তি
- Leader: Akhter Hossen
- General Secretary: Nahid Islam
- Founded: 4 September 2023
- Dissolved: 14 September 2024
- Split from: Bangladesh Chhatra Odhikar Parishad
- Succeeded by: Jatiya Chhatra Shakti
- Headquarters: Dhaka

Ganotantrik Chhatra Shakti (Bengali: গণতান্ত্রিক ছাত্রশক্তি, lit. 'Democratic Student Force') was a student political organization in Bangladesh. Akhter Hossen and other students announced the formation of the organization on 4 October 2023. About six weeks after the July Uprising forced Prime Minister Sheikh Hasina to resign on 5 August 2024, the organization was dissolved. Two leaders became advisors in the interim government of Bangladesh.

== History ==
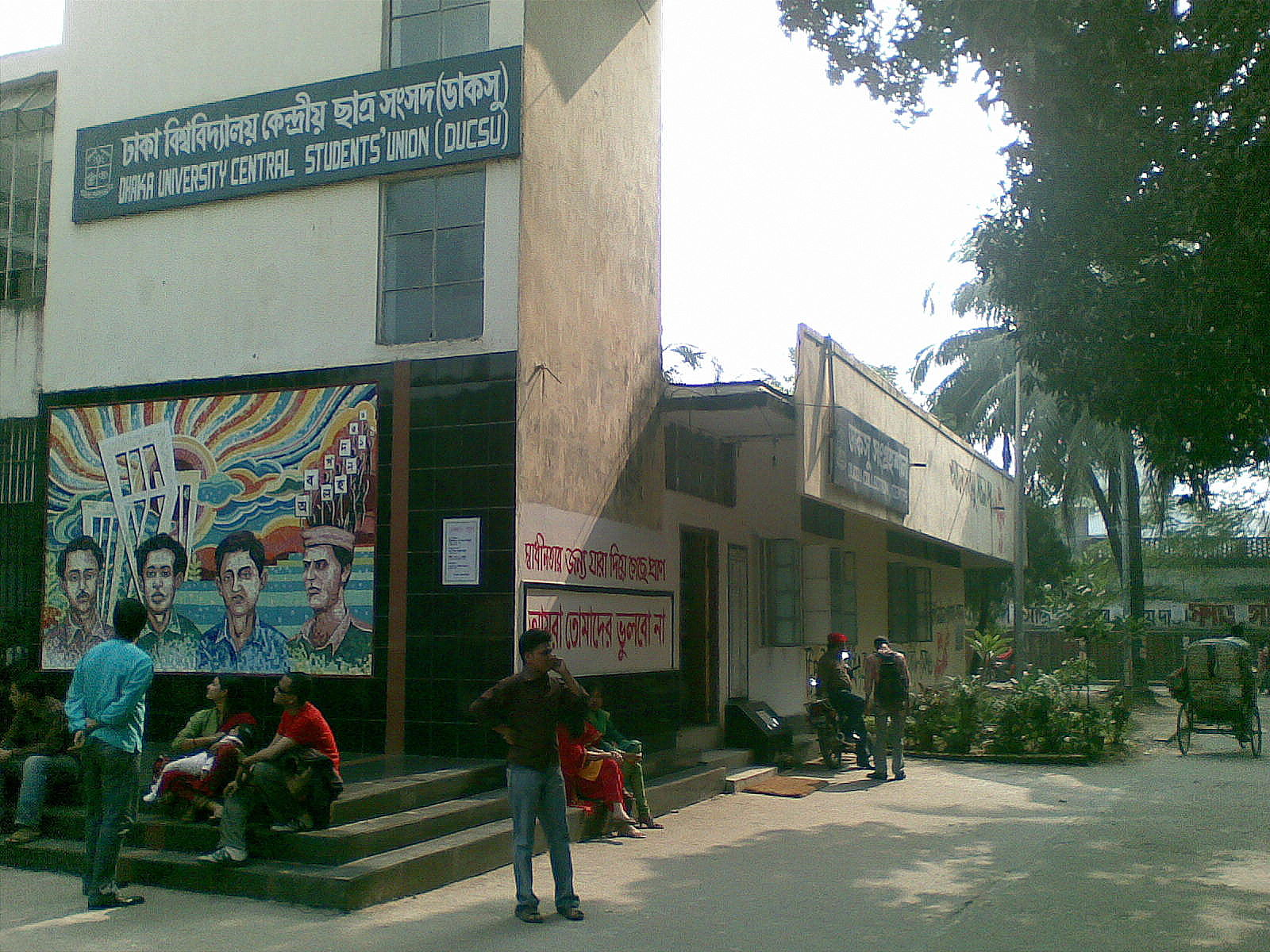
DUCSU, where the formation of Gonotantrik Chhatra Shakti was announced

Akhter Hossen was president of the Dhaka University branch of Bangladesh Chhatra Odhikar Parishad. He resigned in July 2023 over differences with the central vice president of the organization, Nurul Haque Nur. On 4 October 2023, Hossain and other students, many of whom were former associates of Nur, announced the creation of a new organization, Ganotantrik Chhatra Shakti. Hossain was the convener of the group, while Nahid Islam was its member secretary. A central committee of 21 members was announced.

The organization stated their principles as education, peace, and freedom. They gave their five aims as: restructuring the education system; building political figures, scope and culture; student welfare; establishing political connections between students and civil society; and restructuring the state-political system.

In 2024, the 2024 Bangladesh quota reform movement and the Non-cooperation movement (2024) were successfully completed under the leadership of the Students Against Discrimination. In the leadership of these movements, members of Gonotantrik Chhatra Shakti were present. Prime Minister Sheikh Hasina was forced to resign on 5 August, in part as a result of the efforts of Gonotantrik Chhatra Shakti members in the non-cooperation movement.

The organization was dissolved on 14 September 2024. Various reasons were given: that its goals had been achieved, that most of its leaders were no longer active in the organization, and that some Dhaka University students had demanded that party-based student politics be banned on campus.

== Notable members ==
Two leaders of the organization, Asif Mahmud and Nahid Islam, became advisors in the interim government of Bangladesh in August 2024. Mahmud was given responsibility for the Ministry of Youth and Sports. Islam was given responsibility for the Ministry of Posts, Telecommunications and Information Technology.
