= Nahid Islam =

Bangladeshi politician and activist (born 1988)

- নাহিদ ইসলাম
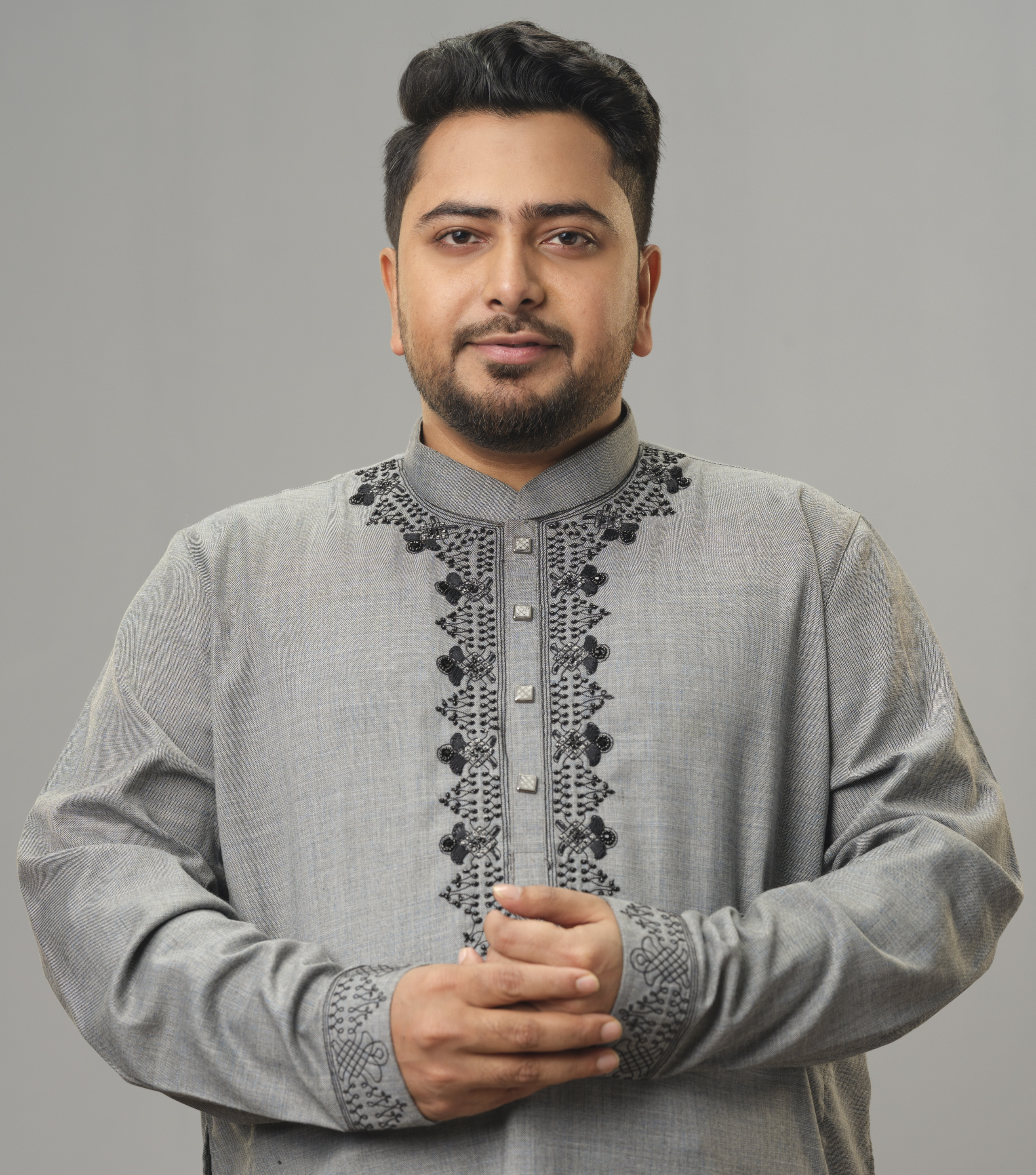
- Nahid Islam in 2026

Convener of National Citizen Party
- Incumbent
- Assumed office 28 February 2025
- Member Secretary: Akhter Hossen
- Preceded by: office established

13th Chief Whip of the Opposition
- Incumbent
- Assumed office 17 February 2026
- Leader: Shafiqur Rahman
- Preceded by: Mujibul Haque

Member of Parliament
- Incumbent
- Assumed office 17 February 2026
- Preceded by: Md Wakil Uddin
- Constituency: Dhaka-11
Interim Government offices
Adviser for Posts, Telecommunications and Information Technology
In office 9 August 2024 – 25 February 2025
Chief Adviser	Muhammad Yunus
Preceded by	Zunaid Ahmed Palak
Succeeded by	Muhammad Yunus
Adviser of Information and Broadcasting
In office 16 August 2024 – 25 February 2025
Chief Adviser	Muhammad Yunus
Preceded by	Mohammad A Arafat
Succeeded by	Mahfuj Alam

Member Secretary of the Gonotantrik Chhatra Shakti
- In office 4 September 2023 – 14 September 2024
- Convener: Akhter Hossen
- Preceded by: position created
- Succeeded by: organisation dissolved

Personal details
- Born: Muhammad Nahid Islam; 28 April 1998 (age 28) Dhaka, Bangladesh
- Party: National Citizen Party
- Spouse: Fatimatuz Johra
- Education: University of Dhaka
- Occupation: Politician
- Organization: Gonotantrik Chhatra Shakti (2023–2024)
- Website: https://www.nahidislam.info/
- Nickname: Fahim

Nahid Islam (Note: Bengali: নাহিদ ইসলাম) (born 28 April 1998) is a Bangladeshi politician and the founding convener of National Citizen Party, the country's first student led political party, who has served as a member of Parliament and Opposition Chief Whip of the Jatiya Sangsad since 2026. He was the central key coordinator of the Students Against Discrimination, which led the July Uprising. He also served as an adviser of the Interim government of Bangladesh under Muhammad Yunus.

Born in 1998, Nahid got involved with politics while attending the University of Dhaka. After government job quota system was reinstated in 2024, he became the central key coordinator of Students Against Discrimination and led 2024 quota reform movement. He came to national attention when he was abducted, tortured and detained by the Detective Branch of Dhaka Metropolitan Police. Following his release, he declared the one-point demand for the resignation of Prime Minister Sheikh Hasina on 3 August 2024, thus becoming the most prominent face of Bangladesh's mass uprising.

After the resignation of Sheikh Hasina on 5 August 2024, Nahid became an adviser of the newly formed interim government led by Muhammad Yunus on 8 August and held two ministries. He resigned from the council of advisers in late February 2025 and became the founding convener of the National Citizen Party on 28 February 2025. Nahid was named on the Time 100 Next list in 2024.

== Early life and education ==
Muhammad Nahid Islam was born in Banasree in Dhaka on 28 April 1998. His father is a teacher and his mother is a homemaker. He studied at St. Joseph Higher Secondary School, Govt Science College and the Department of Sociology at the University of Dhaka. His bachelor thesis was on the causes behind the failure of student movements in Bangladesh.

== Student activism ==
=== Early activism ===
As a first year university student in 2017, Nahid protested against a coal-fired power plant close to the Sundarbans. In 2019, he formed a student organization called Gonotantrik Chhatra Shakti (lit. 'Democratic Student Force') in the University of Dhaka along with his peers and was a central leader of this organization.

=== July Uprising ===
Nahid became a coordinator for the Students Against Discrimination, which organized protests advocating for quota reforms in government jobs. The movement later expanded into a non-cooperation campaign demanding the resignation of Sheikh Hasina and her government.

==== Abduction and detainment ====
Nahid gained national attention in mid-July 2024 when he and five other coordinators were detained by the Detective Branch (DB) as the protests escalated. At midnight on 19 July 2024, he was reportedly taken from a house in Sabujbagh by approximately 25 men in plain clothing. He was blindfolded, handcuffed, and transported to a location where he was questioned about his involvement in the student movement and subjected to mistreatment. On 21 July, he was found unconscious and injured under a bridge in Purbachal. On July 26, he was apprehended at Gonoshasthaya Nagar Hospital in Dhanmondi by individuals identifying themselves as members of various intelligence agencies, including the Dhaka Metropolitan Police's DB.

The DB later confirmed that they had taken Nahid and five other coordinators of the Students Against Discrimination into custody for "safety reasons". Subsequently, Nahid and other coordinators issued a statement from the DB headquarters urging the protesters to call off the demonstrations, citing that the movement's main objective of reforming the quotas had been achieved. However, Nahid later clarified that he had been coerced into making the statement.

Shortly afterwards, Nahid delivered the one-point demand on behalf of students involved in the movement demanding Hasina's resignation. Following the resignation and departure of Hasina to India, Nahid stated that their objectives were not fully achieved. The group then aimed to "abolish fascist systems forever" and called on Muhammad Yunus to lead an interim government, which he agreed to.

== Career ==
=== Adviser of the interim government ===
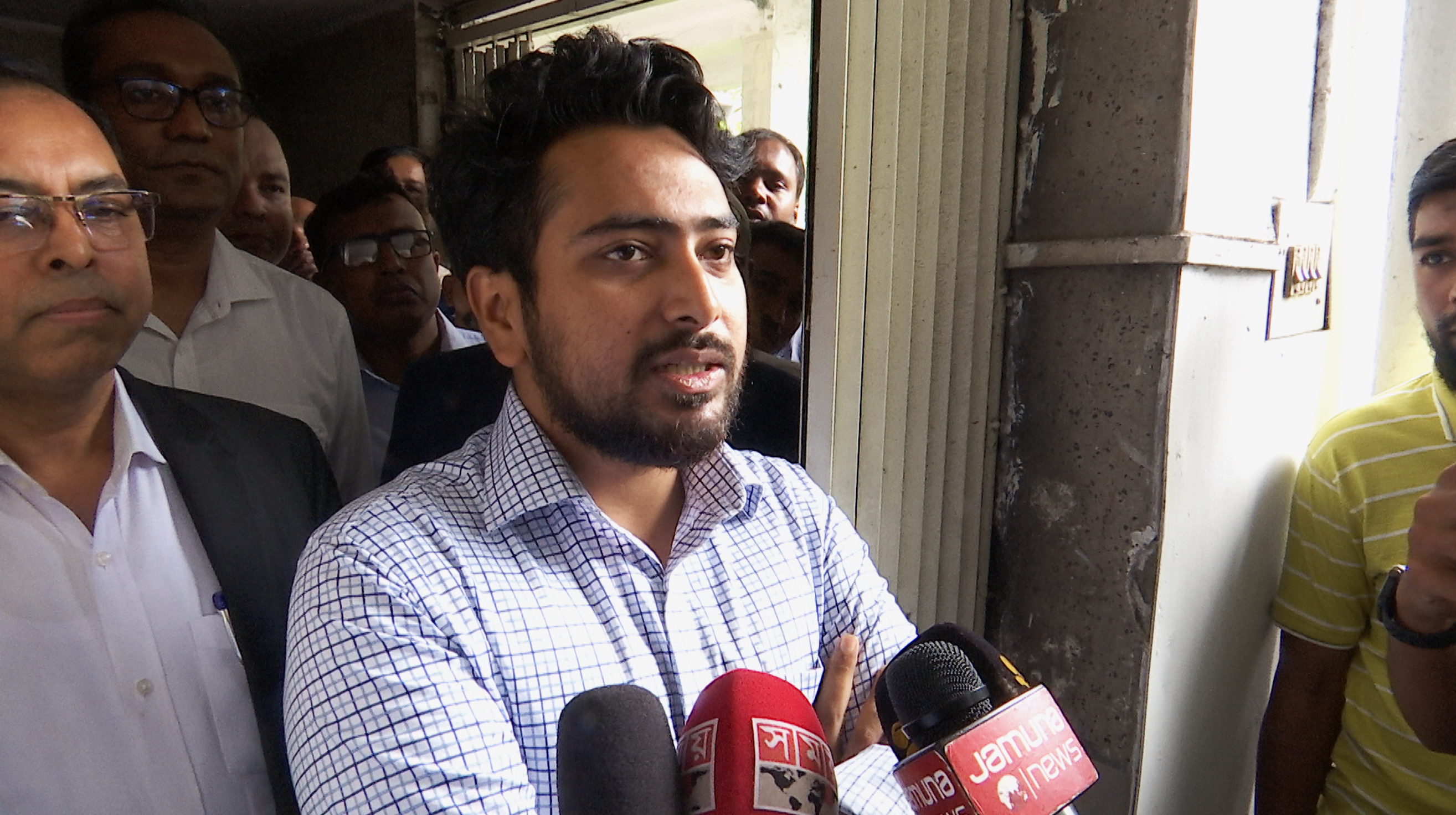
Nahid Islam briefing the press as adviser in 2024

Nahid and fellow activist Asif Mahmud joined the interim government and took the oath with most other advisers on 8 August 2024. The next day, he was appointed in-Charge of Posts, Telecommunications, and Information Technology. Subsequently, on 16 August 2024, he was also assigned the Ministry of Information and Broadcasting.

During his tenure as the Adviser of Posts, Telecommunications, and Information Technology in Bangladesh's interim government, Nahid initiated several reforms aimed at enhancing the country's digital infrastructure and accessibility.

Under his supervision, the ministry focused on reducing mobile service taxes, which had been a barrier to wider internet access, especially for low-income households. He also advocated for policies that would attract foreign investment and encourage innovation in the ICT industry.

As the Adviser of Information and Broadcasting, Nahid presided over the establishment of the Bangladesh Film Certification Board, based on long-standing demands from filmmakers.

His contributions during this period were recognized internationally with his inclusion in the Time magazine's Time 100 Next 2024 list.

=== Convener of National Citizen Party ===
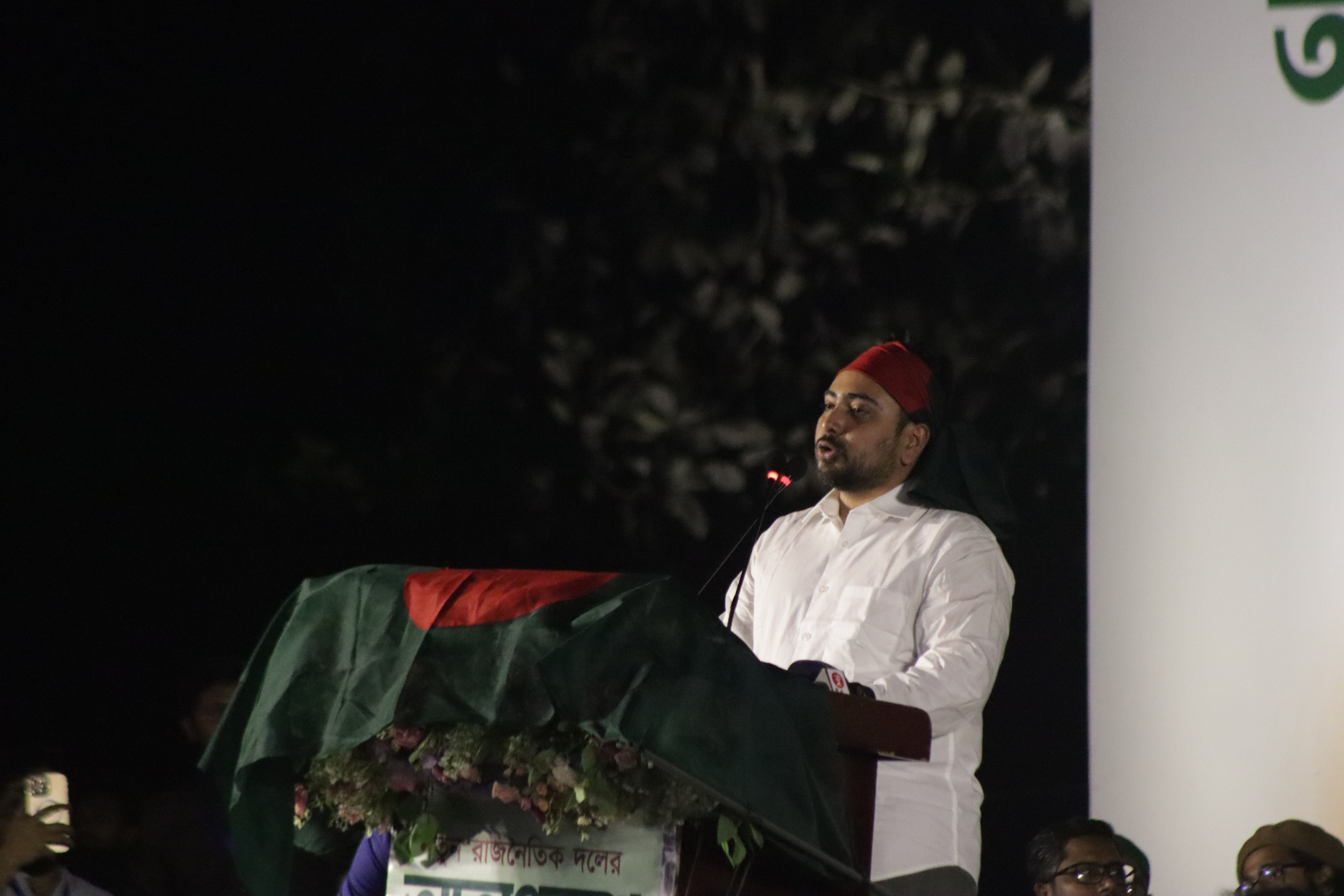
Nahid delivering speech in the launching ceremony of NCP

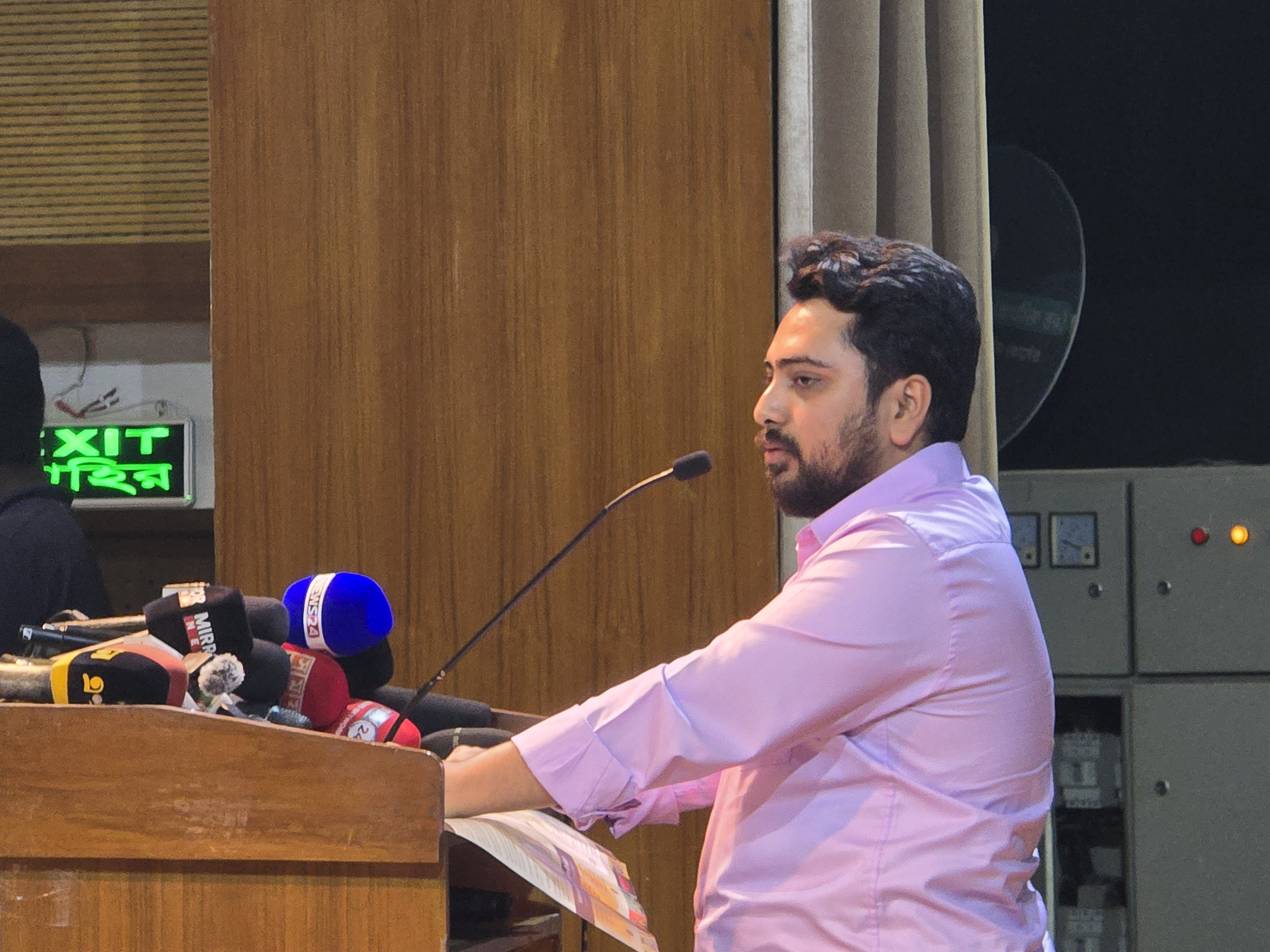
Nahid delivering a speech at the Nagorik Coalition event, May 2025.

Nahid resigned as an adviser on February 25 to be the convener of the National Citizen Party (NCP), with the affiliation of Students Against Discrimination and Jatiya Nagorik Committee. On 28 February, he was officially designated as the convener of new party.

In his inaugural speech, Nahid declared that there would be no place for pro-India or pro-Pakistan politics in Bangladesh and stated that his party would focus on the national interests of Bangladeshi people with a self-reliant economy. He also outlined his party's goal to establish a "new democratic constitution" for the "second republic".

In 2026, he was elected from the Dhaka-11 constituency in the 2026 general election.
