= National Citizen Party =

Political party in Bangladesh

National Citizen Party জাতীয় নাগরিক পার্টি
- Abbreviation: NCP
- Convener: Nahid Islam
- Member Secretary: Akhter Hossen
- Spokesperson: Asif Mahmud
- Founder: Students Against Discrimination; Jatiya Nagorik Committee
- Founded: 28 February 2025
- Registered: 17 November 2025
- Headquarters: Rupayan Trade Center, 114 Kazi Nazrul Islam Avenue, Banglamotor, Dhaka
- Student wing: Jatiya Chhatra Shakti
- Youth wing: Jatiya Jubo Shakti
- Women's wing: Jatiya Nari Shakti
- Trade union: Jatiya Sramik Shakti
- Peasants wing: Jatiya Krishak Shakti
- Ideology: Reformism; Third Way; Pluralism
- Political position: Centre
- National affiliation: 11 Party Alliance (since 2025) Former: Democratic Reform Alliance (2025)
- Colors: Green
- Slogan: Inquilab Zindabad
- Jatiya Sangsad: 8 / 350

Election symbol
- Water lily bud

Party flag

Website
- ncpbd.org

The National Citizen Party (Bengali: জাতীয় নাগরিক পার্টি, romanized: Jātīẏô Nāgôrik Pārṭi, NCP) is a centrist political party in Bangladesh.

The NCP was formed in February 2025 following the July Uprising and positions itself as a youth-led, progressive, and "Bangladeshpontha" (Bangladesh-centric) party. The party's key figures include Nahid Islam, Akhter Hossen, Asif Mahmud, Sarjis Alam, Hasnat Abdullah, and Nasiruddin Patwary, some of whom became the world's first Gen Z protest leaders to have been elected as Member of Parliament.

The NCP positions itself against extremism, pro-Pakistan, and extreme Awami League or pro-India ideologies. In contrast, it supports moderate, nationalist, and centrist policies. It is recognized as the third-largest middle-ground party after the BNP. Initiated by the Students Against Discrimination and the Jatiya Nagorik Committee, it was established on 28 February 2025 as the first student-led political party in the history of Bangladesh. It was established in the Aftermath of the July uprising.

After the fall of the Awami League government following the July Uprising, a manifesto by the leadership of the Students Against Discrimination mentioned the idea of a new political arrangement. Subsequently, in September, the Jatiya Nagorik Committee was formed, and efforts were made to establish committees in every upazila across Bangladesh. In February 2025, the Students Against Discrimination and the Jatiya Nagorik Committee finalized the formation of a new political party, which was formed on 28 February 2025, with Nahid Islam as its convener.

On 28 December 2025, the NCP joined the Bangladesh Jamaat-e-Islami-led 11 Party Alliance ahead of the 2026 Bangladeshi general election.

Though self-describing as centrist and pluralist, the party does not confess any unified ideology, thus allowing many factions to function. Since joining the alliance, however, it has faced internal resignations and criticism from observers who cite a right-wing tilt within its ranks.

The party campaigns for a "second republic" and a new constitution.

== History ==
=== Background ===
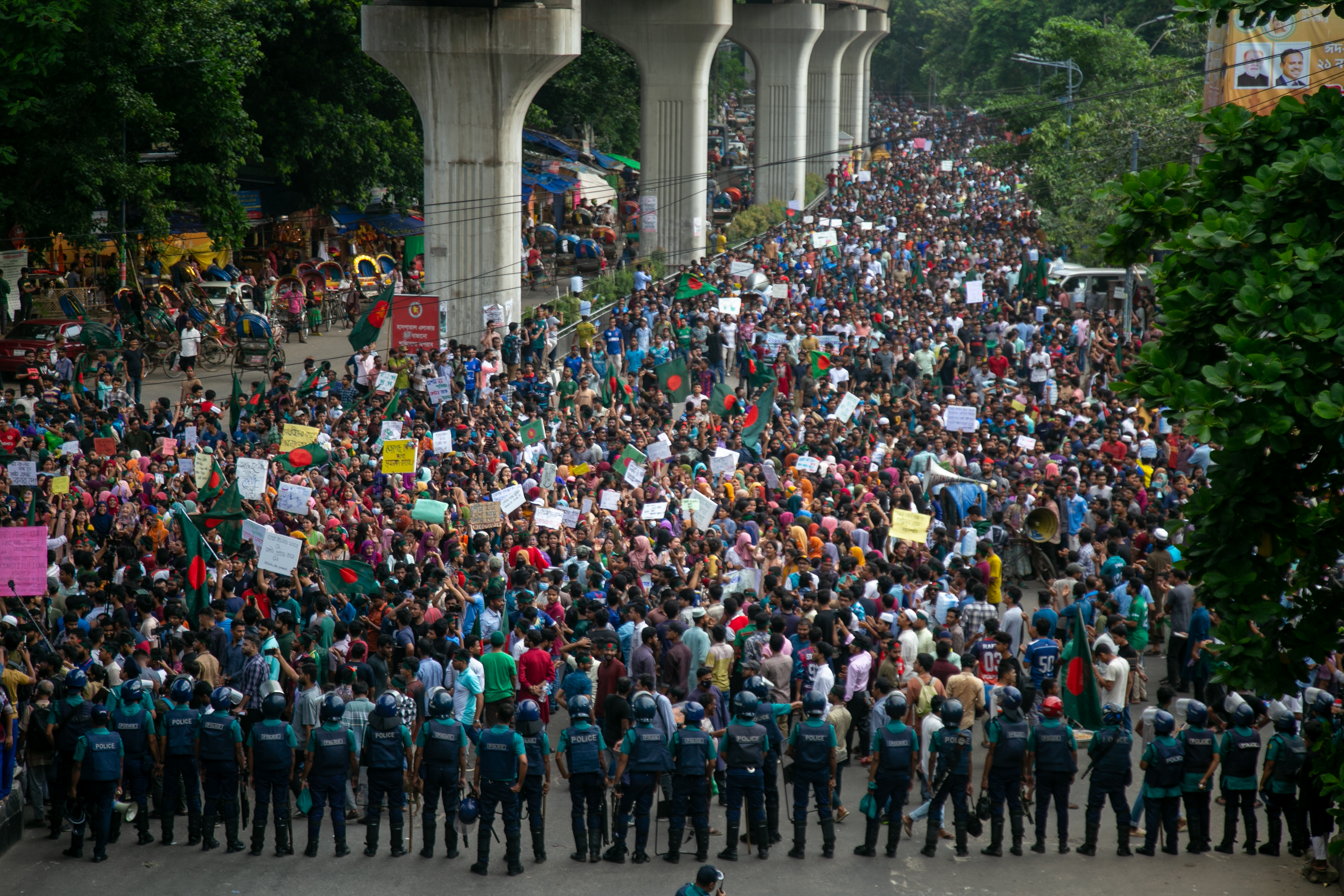
July Uprising in 2024

A faction of the Bangladesh Chhatra Odhikar Parishad, which led the 2018 Bangladesh quota reform movement, split from the group and formed a student organization called Gonotantrik Chhatra Shakti on October 2, 2023. In 2024, alongside most student organizations in Bangladesh, the leaders of Gonotantrik Chhatra Shakti joined a non-partisan political platform named the Students Against Discrimination, participating in the 2024 Bangladesh quota reform movement and 2024 Non-cooperation movement. The members of this new student organization played a leading role in these movements. On August 5, 2024, Sheikh Hasina, the President of the Awami League, resigned from the position of Prime Minister and fled to India, leading to the fall of her government. After the success of the uprising, rumors spread that the Students Against Discrimination was going to form a new political party. However, on August 16, the organization's central coordinator and advisor to the interim government, Nahid Islam, dismissed these rumors, stating that there were no plans to form a party at the moment, and that their organization was focused on implementing a new political arrangement as per their proposed manifesto.

On September 8, the Jatiya Nagorik Committee was established under the leadership of Akhter Hossen, convener of Gonotantrik Chhatra Shakti, and Nasiruddin Patwary, with the aim of restructuring the country. On September 14, 2024, Gonotantrik Chhatra Shakti was dissolved. The announcement of the dissolution, following the upheaval, led to speculations that the organization's leaders would enter politics. On the other hand, a source within the organization revealed that the key leaders of Gonotantrik Chhatra Shakti were working towards forming a political party. However, on October 25, the central coordinator of the Students Against Discrimination and main organizer of the Jatiya Nagorik Committee, Sarjis Alam, stated that forming a new political party immediately after the uprising would cause division within the country. He mentioned that while they had the right to form a political party, it could be done in the future under a different platform and name. On October 27, Asif Mahmud, the central coordinator of the Students Against Discrimination and advisor to the interim government, labeled the rumors of a new party as propaganda, stating that "now is not the time to form a party."

In November 2024, Sarjis Alam highlighted the need for more political parties in Bangladesh and left the decision of forming a new student-led political party to the people. In the same month, it was decided that after the formation of a political party by the Students Against Discrimination and the Jatiya Nagorik Committee, both organizations would not be dissolved. Instead, they would function as "pressure groups" for the new party, allowing their members to join the party without any formal affiliation to the organizations.

In December 2024, a survey published by the BRAC Institute of Governance and Development indicated that 40% of voters would support the new student-led party in the upcoming national elections. In December, a source revealed that the new party would be officially launched in February of the following year. It was also reported that committees would be formed in every police precinct across Bangladesh by January to support this goal.

=== Preparations ===
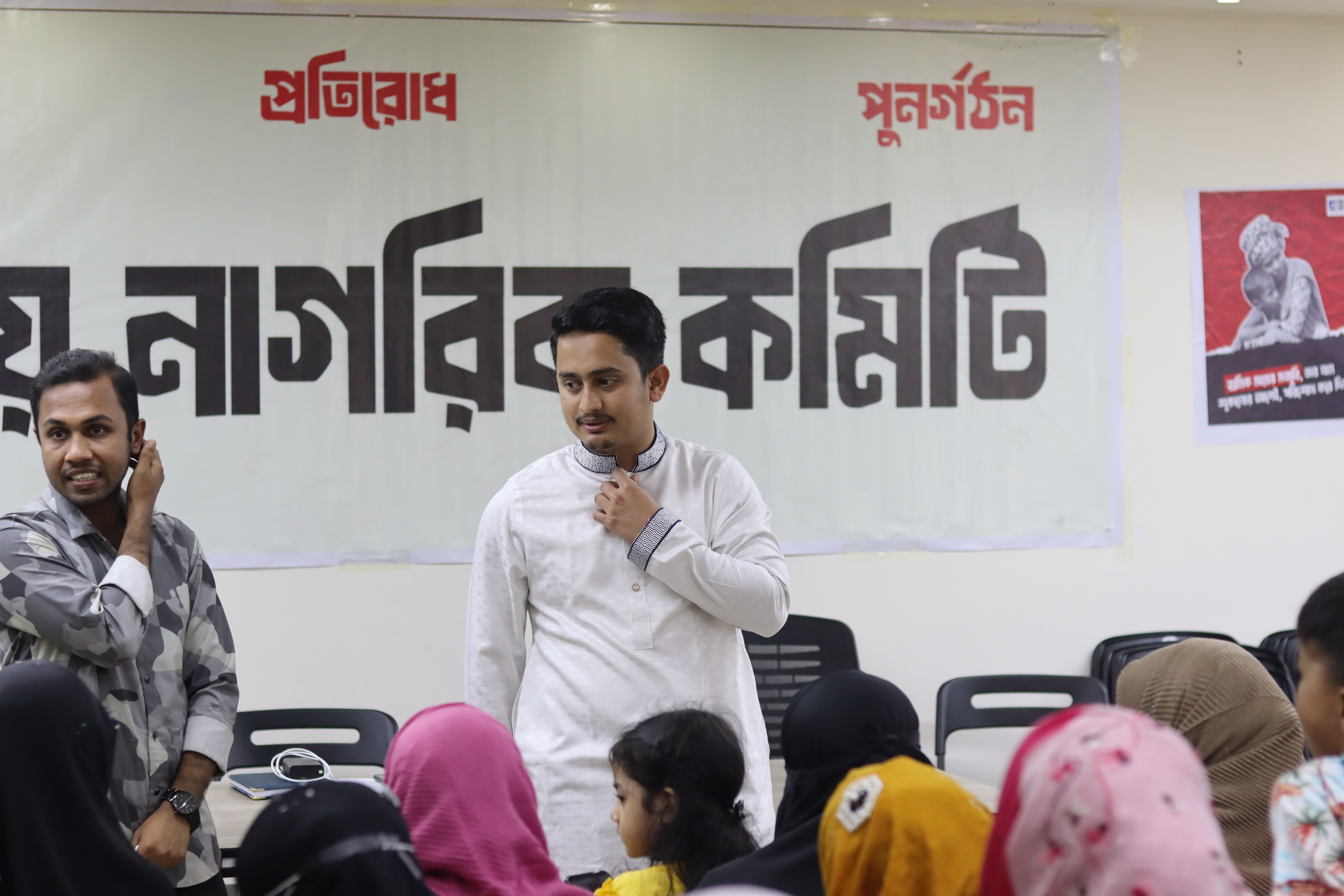
Sarjis Alam at the headquarters of the Jatiya Nagorik Committee. The organisation contributed to the formation of the new political party.

In January 2025, over a hundred names were proposed for the new party by the planners. On January 27, a public opinion poll released by the Bangladesh Youth Leadership Center revealed that young people were more interested in reforms within existing political parties than in the new political party. According to a report by Amar Desh newspaper, students at Dhaka University had positively accepted the idea of the new political party formed by the students involved in the uprising.

On 5 February, public opinion surveys regarding the new party began. In early February 2025, various sources indicated that Nahid Islam might be the proposed convener (leader) of the party. In the same month, the Students Against Discrimination and the Jatiya Nagorik Committee reached a final decision to form a new political party. According to reports from February 13, the final preparations for the formation of the party were ongoing. According to information provided by the leaders of the Nagorik Committee, the announcement of the formation of the political party was planned for between February 23–25. During a meeting of the Jatiya Nagorik Committee, Akhter Hossen's name was tentatively finalized for the position of leader.

It has been reported that the announcement of the new political party's formation will take place at an event held either at Central Shaheed Minar or in front of the Jatiya Sangsad Bhaban on Manik Mia Avenue. The party's headquarters is planned to be established in Farmgate or Banani, Dhaka. According to Samanta Sharmin, the spokesperson of the Jatiya Nagorik Committee, an application for registration will be submitted to the Election Commission as soon as possible after the party's formation is announced. It was learned that, as part of its political activities to attract public attention, the party plans to organize a 15-day-long march from the home of martyr Abu Sayed in Rangpur who was killed in the July massacre to the home of another martyr, Wasim Akram, in Chattogram. However, considering that Ramadan is upcoming, this plan may be temporarily postponed.

By February 17, the final decision was made regarding who would occupy the nine positions in the new party. It was reported that Samantha Sharmin or Umama Fatema from the Students Against Discrimination could be selected for the position of spokesperson. On the same day, Nahid Islam announced that he would formally decide whether he would leave his advisory position and join the new party within the current week.

On February 19, it was revealed that discussions were being accelerated regarding the addition of Nurul Haque Nur from the Gono Odhikar Parishad to the new party, amid a dispute over the position of member secretary. He had expressed interest in either the role of convener or member secretary. However, the organizers of the new party preferred Nahid Islam as the convener, which led to the possibility of an alliance between the new party and Ganadhikar Parishad. According to an online survey conducted by Daily Ittefaq from February 17 to 19, Sarjis Alam had secured the top spot for the position of member secretary, surpassing Nasiruddin Patwary and Akhter Hossen. A source on February 20 indicated that the new party could be officially launched on the 26th. On February 21, it was reported that the number of positions in the new party would be increased to resolve conflicts over party roles. It was also revealed that former military personnel would join the new party, and the Jatiya Nagorik Committee was scheduled to meet with some of them on February 22. According to sources on February 22, while nine names were under consideration for the new party, English names were being prioritized. However, due to the number of candidates exceeding the number of positions, the organizers were under pressure to finalize the committee.

=== Establishment ===
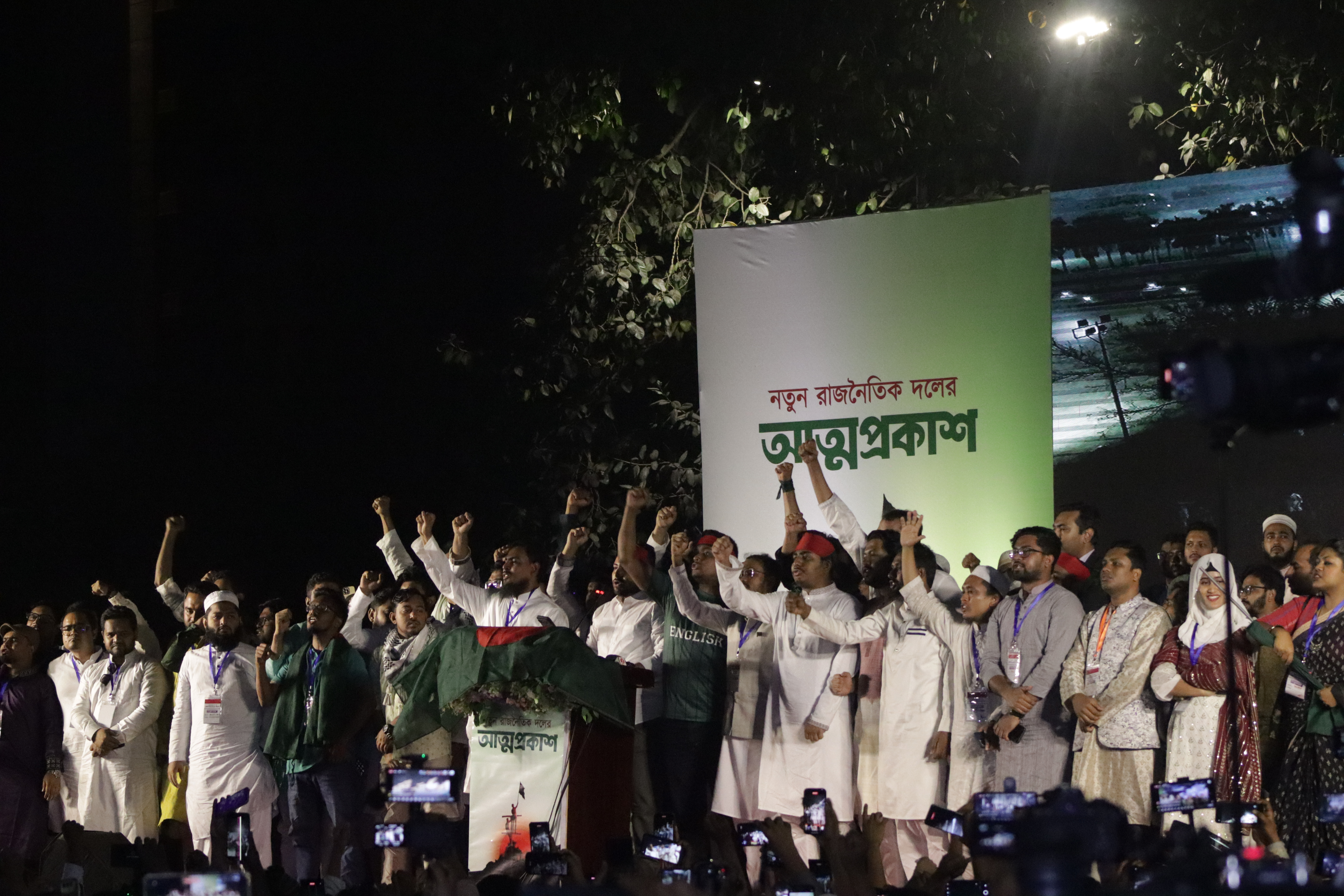
Top leaders of the NCP at its launch event on 28 February 2025 at Manik Mia Avenue, Dhaka.

In July 2024, through immense sacrifice, the students and the masses orchestrated an unprecedented uprising, toppling the fascist regime that had gripped the country for nearly a decade and a half. However, we must remember that this new freedom, won through the sacrifices of countless martyrs, was not simply to replace one government with another. Rather, the people rose in response to the aspiration of dismantling the entrenched fascist system and rebuilding the state on the foundation of people's rights. It is with this vision that we announce the formation of the National Citizen Party (NCP)—a democratic, justice-oriented, and truly representative political party.

— Nahid Islam, at the NCP's launch event

The launch event of the new party was attended by the families of those injured and killed in the uprising and the July massacre, political party leaders, diplomats, and student coordinators of public and private universities who led the July uprising. Various political figures, including chief adviser Muhammad Yunus and former prime minister Khaleda Zia, were invited to the launch ceremony. The launch ceremony began at 4:20 pm on 28 February. After recitation from the Quran, Gita, Tripitaka, and Bible, the national anthem was sung. A minute of silence was then observed in memory of those killed in the July massacre. After showing documentaries, Mim Akhter, sister of victim Ismail Hossain Rabbi, who was killed in the July massacre, announced the launch of the party and announced the names of Nahid Islam as the convener and Akhter Hossen as the member secretary. Akhter Hossen then announced the names of the party's convening committee members. Then, as convener, Nahid Islam read out the manifesto of the National Citizen Party.

== Ideology ==
The party sets its primary goal to establish a "second republic", which is enshrined in their founding manifesto. The NCP argues that the current Constitution of Bangladesh fosters "constitutional authoritarianism" which needs to be dismantled. On its founding day, party leader Nahid Islam said the party will focus only on Bangladesh's needs, not on supporting India or Pakistan. The goal is to build a fair system where people's rights are protected, corruption and nepotism are eliminated, and wealth is shared more equally. They aim to build a self-sufficient economy, and ensure that no citizen faces discrimination or abuse of power. Later, Nahid outlined his party's political visions in a Facebook post, where he asserted that the NCP's foundation is rooted in the aspirations of the Liberation War of Bangladesh and the July Revolution, as well as in the anti-colonial and anti-caste/elite struggles of the people of Bengal. He claimed that the NCP stands against Islamophobia, communalism, religious extremism and fanaticism. The party's socioeconomic vision included commitments to education, public health, agriculture, urban management, labour rights, and employment. Women empowerment, security and fair inheritance right were given special priorities. In foreign policy, he argued that the NCP would take a strong approach against Indian hegemony and Hindutva.

The party describes itself as centrist and pluralist. Chief organizer (northern) Sarjis Alam described centrism and "Bangladeshpontha" (lit. 'Pro-Bangladesh-ness') as the most important terms in their party. According to the organizers, the party would take a centrist approach rather than a left-wing or a right-wing ideology to avoid left-right division for reflecting pluralism.

The party's member secretary Akhter Hossen argued that his party would not support secularism, saying: "In the fundamental principles of the existing constitution, Islamophobia has been practiced in Bangladesh in the name of secularism. Through this word, division has been created instead of religious harmony. More division is increasing through politics. We want to go beyond the politics which is of the word secularism and do the politics of harmony." Acknowledging the concerns from those with a liberal background that the party may become aligned with right-wing Islamists, Nahid Islam refuted the allegations, describing them as "propaganda meant to tarnish the party's reputation". He stated that: "Islam is the majority religion in Bangladesh and we are sensitive to that, we are sensitive to those values, but we do not want to create any extremist party or any pro-Islamic party. This is very clear."

Despite claims from their leaders, political analysts pointed out that the party lacks any comprehensive political ideology or position. It didn't formally clarify what it perceived "centrism" to mean, with many of its politicians having diverse or unclear concepts of centrism. Also, analysts claimed that NCP's political activities remains centred solely on the opposition to Awami League, which risks political violence and survival of NCP as a political party. According to Aditya Gowdara Shivamurthy and Madhurima Pramanik, the party's lack of ideology, opposition to secularism and anti-India and anti-AL rhetoric "brought the NCP closer to right-wing parties and extremist groups". Professor of Dhaka University Zobaida Nasreen claimed that the NCP was doing politics solely "unifying" with the religious groups and some of their activities came to portray themselves as far-right.

The party organizers are said to have analyzed the history of various political parties worldwide such as Turkey's Justice and Development Party (AKP), Pakistan's Tehreek-e-Insaf (PTI), and India's Aam Aadmi Party (AAP) to win public support. Party organisers opined that it would participate in the next general election independently without forming any alliance. However, a source from the Students Against Discrimination stated that if the interim government calls for a general election before implementing necessary state reforms, the party would refrain from participating. According to members of the executive committee of Jatiya Nagorik Committee, the party plans to announce a programme for 2035 and 2047.

=== Factions ===
The NCP is a heavily factionalized party. Tensions often emerge between several factions due to the diverse ideological backgrounds, for which, leaders having ideological similarities has developed a "sense of kinship" with other parties with similar position. For example, leaders coming from the Qawmi Madrasa backgrounds align with certain religious parties, while those from leftist backgrounds align themselves with left-wing parties.

Such tensions were observed during the formation of the party when dispute emerged over selection of the post of Member Secretary for the new party. The primary candidates were Nasiruddin Patwary, Akhter Hossen and Sarjis Alam. After the finalization of Akhter's name, a dispute broke out between his supporters and those of Ali Ahsan Zonaed, a former member of the Islami Chhatra Shibir, who later resigned from the party, over the position. According to Amar Desh, disagreements between Islamist, centrist, and left-wing factions over who will be elected to various positions in the proposed party caused delays in its formation. There were even concerns that if the dispute over the member secretary position was not resolved, two new parties might emerge.

Despite having internal conflicts, the party leaders generally welcome factionalism within the party, asserting the political rights of people from different ideological backgrounds and advocating an environment of peaceful coexistence. Professor of Rajshahi University Al-Mamun claimed that both left and right-wing groups were trying to influence the party. Ultimaltely the Islamist faction of the party overpowered the liberal faction, and the party forged an alliance for the upcoming elections with major Islamic fundamentalist groups like the Jamaat-e-Islami, Nizam-e-Islam & Khelafat-e-Majlish which have a declared agenda of implementing sharia as law.

=== Voter base ===
A June 2025 survey conducted by the South Asian Network on Economic Modeling (SANEM) on the Bangladeshis aged between 15 and 35 found that the NCP's projected vote share was comparatively high among young females and the urban youth of the country, comparing with the young males and the rural youth, respectively. The survey found that 14.44% males and 17.47% females intended to vote for the NCP in 2026 general election, while 15.38% of rural and 16.28% of urban youth intended to vote for the party.

== Elections ==
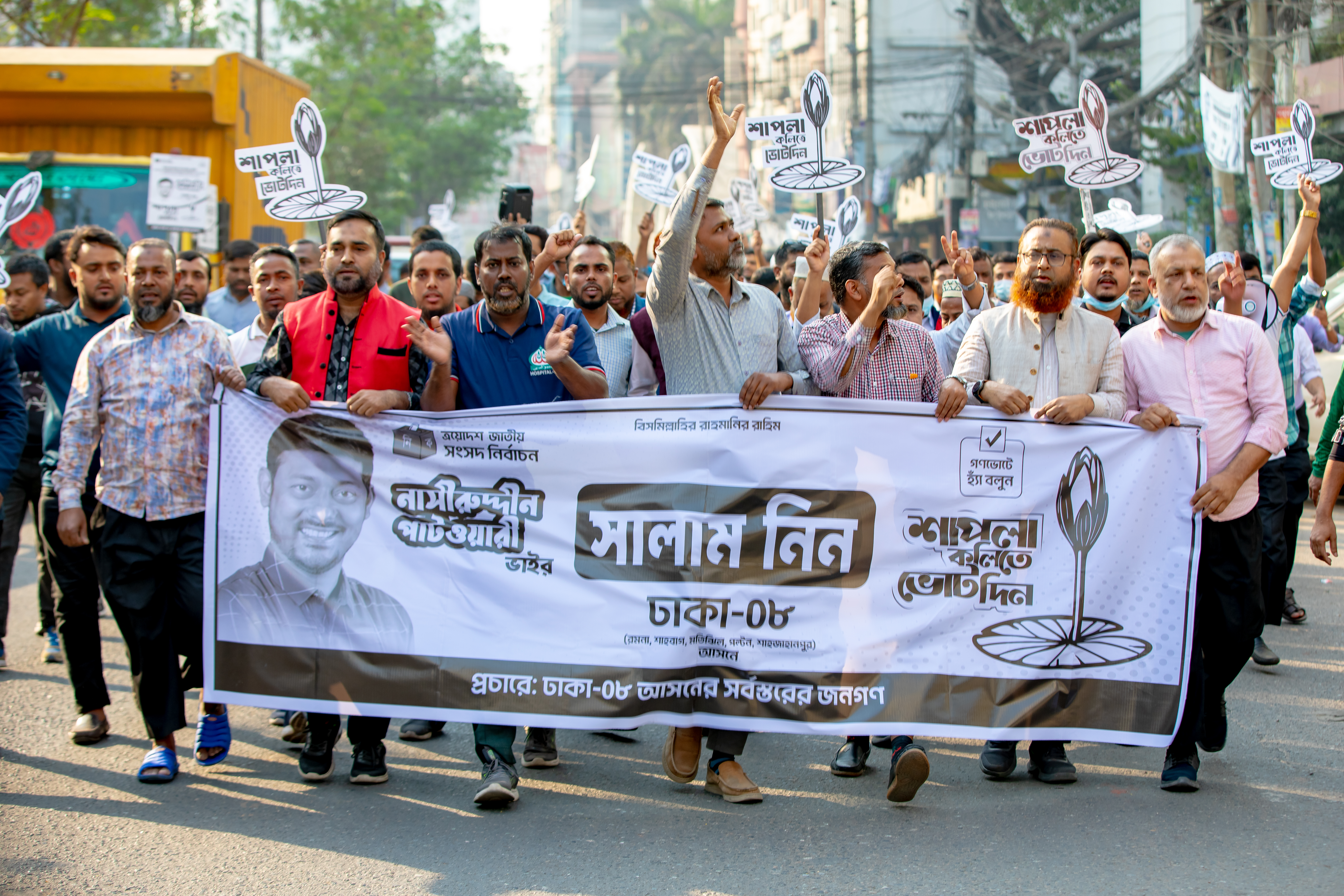
NCP candidate Nasiruddin Patwary's Election Rallies at Dhaka-8

The NCP began preparations for the 13th general election scheduled for 12 February 2026 following its formation in February 2025, focusing on youth-led reforms and democratic rebuilding. In December 2025, the NCP released a preliminary list of candidates for 125 seats, indicating plans to contest widely. On 7 December 2025, the NCP formed the "Democratic Reform Alliance" with the Amar Bangladesh Party (AB Party) and Rashtra Songskar Andolon to contest jointly and advocate reforms. By late December 2025, the NCP joined the 11 Party Alliance electoral alliance led by Bangladesh Jamaat-e-Islami. On 15 January 2026, the alliance announced seat-sharing for 253 constituencies, allocating 30 seats to the NCP and others distributed among partners.

| Portrait | Name | Constituency | Party Position | Election Outcome |
|---|---|---|---|---|
| | Nahid Islam | Dhaka-11 | Convener | Elected |
| | Akhter Hossen | Rangpur-4 | Member Secretary | Elected |
| | Hasnat Abdullah | Comilla-4 | Chief Organiser (Southern Region) | Elected |
| | Abdullah Al Amin | Narayanganj-4 | Joint Member Secretary | Elected |
| | Atiqur Rahman Mujahid | Kurigram-2 | Joint Convener | Elected |
| | Abdul Hannan Masud | Noakhali-6 | Senior Joint Chief Coordinator | Elected |

== Organisation ==
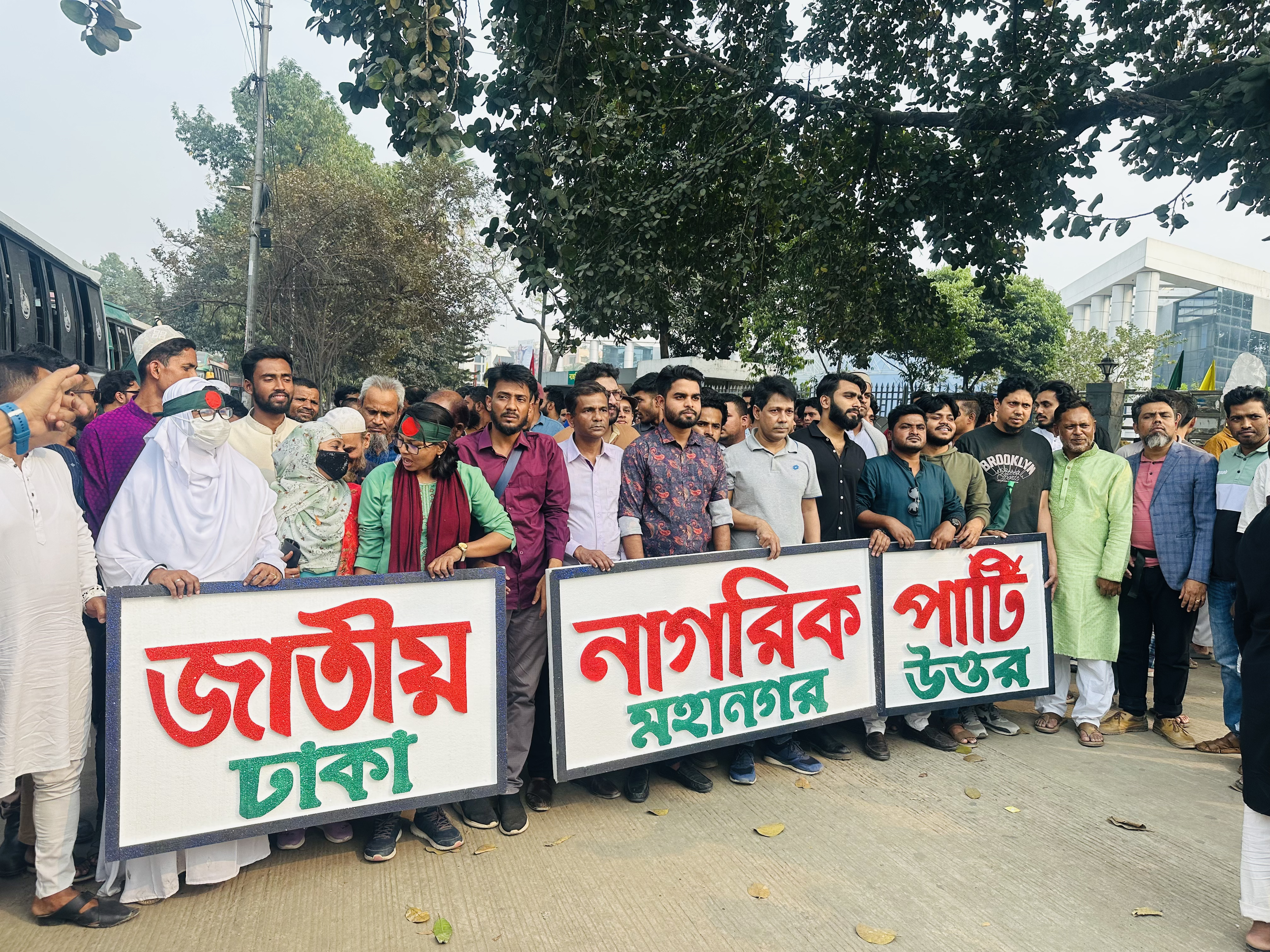
Party workers from Dhaka North branch

Initially, it was proposed to form a joint convener committee of 150–170 members for the party under the leadership of Nasiruddin Patwary and Akhter Hossen. It was reported that by February 2025, nearly 10,000 members had joined the 400 committees formed across the country for the new party. As of 22 February, the organisational positions of coordinator, member secretary, spokesperson, chief organizer, senior joint convener, and senior joint member secretary were finalised. The financial needs of the party would be met through monthly membership dues and crowdfunding.

Jatiya Nagorik Committee stated that the new party may include not only students but also retired military personnel, government officials, business people and politicians those who were previously active in politics against the Awami League.

On 28 February 2025, the National Citizen Party was formed, with Nahid Islam as the convener of the newly launched youth-led party, while Akhter Hossen will serve as the member secretary. The announcement was made by Mim Akhter, the sister of July mass uprising martyr Ismail Hossain Rabbi, at the party's launching ceremony held in front of the parliament complex in Dhaka's Manik Mia Avenue.

The party's leadership structure includes a 151-member committee. Hasnat Abdullah has been appointed as the chief organiser for the southern region, with Sarjis Alam taking the same role for the northern region. Samantha Sharmin and Ariful Islam Adib were named senior joint conveners, while Nahida Sarwar Niva will serve as senior joint member secretary. Other key appointments include Nasiruddin Patwary as chief coordinator and Abdul Hannan Masud as senior joint coordinator. On 2 March, NCP declared its 171-member full committee, which includes politicians from diverse ideological background, ranging from rightists, leftists, Islamic clerics, Marxists, Feminists, ethnic and religious minorities, Dalits and Harijans etc.

| Position | Name | Image | Previous position |
|---|---|---|---|
| Convener | Nahid Islam | | Adviser of the Interim government |
| Member Secretary | Akhter Hossen | | Member Secretary of Jatiya Nagorik Committee |
| Spokesperson | Asif Mahmud | | Adviser of the Interim government |
| Senior Joint Convener | Samantha Sharmin | | Spokesperson of Jatiya Nagorik Committee |
| Senior Joint Convener | Ariful Islam Adib | | |
| Senior Joint Member Secretary | Nahida Sarwar Niva | | |
| Joint Member Secretary | Humayra Noor | | |
| Chief Organiser (Northern Region) | Sarjis Alam | | Chief Organiser of Jatiya Nagorik Committee |
| Chief Organiser (Southern Region) | Hasnat Abdullah | | Convener of Students Against Discrimination |
| Chief Coordinator | Nasiruddin Patwary | | Convener of Jatiya Nagorik Committee |
| Senior Joint Chief Coordinator | Abdul Hannan Masud | | Coordinator of the Students Against Discrimination |

=== Political wings ===
==== Jatiya Chhatra Shakti ====
A student organisation was established for the new political party. It was said that the student organisation could be formed 3–5 days before the formation of the new party. However, on 17 February, former coordinators of the Students Against Discrimination, Abdul Kader and Abu Baker Mazumder, announced at a press conference held at the Madhur Canteen of Dhaka University that the student organisation would be independent of any political party. Abdul Kader, former central coordinator of the organisation, stated that upon hearing the news of the new political party, they felt the need to form a student organisation that would be able to fill the vacuum in student politics caused by the absence of the Chhatra League. According to Kader, if a political party offers or works in line with the spirit of the revolution, the student organization will support that political party. Although the student organisation is said to be independent from the new party, there are ideological similarities between the two and it is believed that the new student organisation could function as the student wing of the party. On February 26, 2025, the student organisation was launched under the name "Bangladesh Ganatantrik Chhatra Sangsad", with Mazumdar as the convener. On 23 October 2025, the organization renamed to Jatiya Chhatra Shakti and officially affiliated with the National Citizen Party (NCP).

==== Jatiya Jubo Shakti ====
In March 2025, Tariqul Islam of NCP declared the formation of a youth wing for NCP. The youth wing called National Youth Power is finally came into existence at 16 May 2025 in Shaheed Abrar Fahad Avenue, Gulistan, Dhaka.

==== Jatiya Sramik Shakti ====
On 23 March 2025, NCP Worker's wing was established with a 161-member central coordination committee.

==== Jatiya Nari Shakti ====
Jatiya Nari Shakti is the women's wing of the NCP. It was established on 8 March 2026 on the occasion of the International Women's Day, with founding convener being Monira Sharmin, member-secretary being Mahmuda Mitu and chief-coordinator being Nusrat Tabassum.

=== Think tank ===
The NCP also created an advisory council comprising teachers, physicians, economists and journalists, which would play an advisory role to convening committee without any decision-making or working role. According to the Dhaka Post, it would function as a think tank and would comprise 50 members consisting intellectuals, former bureaucrats, lawyers & politicians from BNP and other parties.

== Controversies ==
=== Government sponsorships ===
A letter requesting the requisition of five government buses to bring in National Citizen Party (NCP) activists from Pirojpur district for the party's launch event was leaked on social media, sparking widespread criticism. Transparency International Bangladesh (TIB) has expressed deep concern over the incident. In an interview by Financial Times published on the same day, the Chief Adviser Muhammad Yunus has expressed support for the students' formation of a new political party, despite discouraging them. However, he also expressed concern that they could become divided during the process of forming the party, and he acknowledged that they would have to continue their work with that risk in mind.

=== Stance on LGBTQ ===
There was backlash to the party including Muntasir Rahman, an openly gay LGBTQ rights advocate, in its central committee. The party did not make an official statement, but Hasnat Abdullah, chief organizer for the Southern Region, made a post on Facebook highlighting his own religious identity and, without directly addressing Rahman's inclusion, called it an "unintentional mistake". Later, Rahman was excluded from its 217-member convening committee following the objections from Abdullah and Sarjis Alam.

=== Facebook posts on army chief meeting ===
In March 2025, internal tensions emerged within the NCP after senior leaders made conflicting statements regarding a meeting with the Chief of Army Staff Waker-uz-Zaman held on 11 March. NCP Chief Organizer (South) Hasnat Abdullah alleged that military officials proposed reinstating a "refined" version of the Awami League, which he said is "entirely India's plan", sparking demonstrations and political debate. Chief Coordinator Nasiruddin Patwary labeled Hasnat's remarks as unethical and inappropriate for social media, emphasizing that political matters should not be disclosed publicly without party consultation. Sarjis Alam confirmed the meeting and expressed concern over the impact of disclosing sensitive discussions, cautioning that such disclosures could undermine future dialogues. The Army Headquarters later issued a statement dismissing Hasnat's claims as "a complete political stunt" and described his statements as "laughable and immature."

== Election results ==
=== Jatiya Sangsad elections ===
| Election | Party leader | Votes | % | Seats | +/– | Position | Outcome |
|---|---|---|---|---|---|---|---|
| 2026 | Nahid Islam | 2,286,795 | 3.05% | 8 / 350 | New | 3rd | Opposition |

== See also ==
- Politics of Bangladesh
- List of political parties in Bangladesh
  - Awami League
  - Bangladesh Nationalist Party
  - Bangladesh Jamaat-e-Islami
  - Jatiya Party (Ershad)
- Aftermath of the July Uprising
- Student politics of Bangladesh
