= Asif Mahmud =

Bangladeshi politician and student activist (born 1998)

- আসিফ মাহমুদ
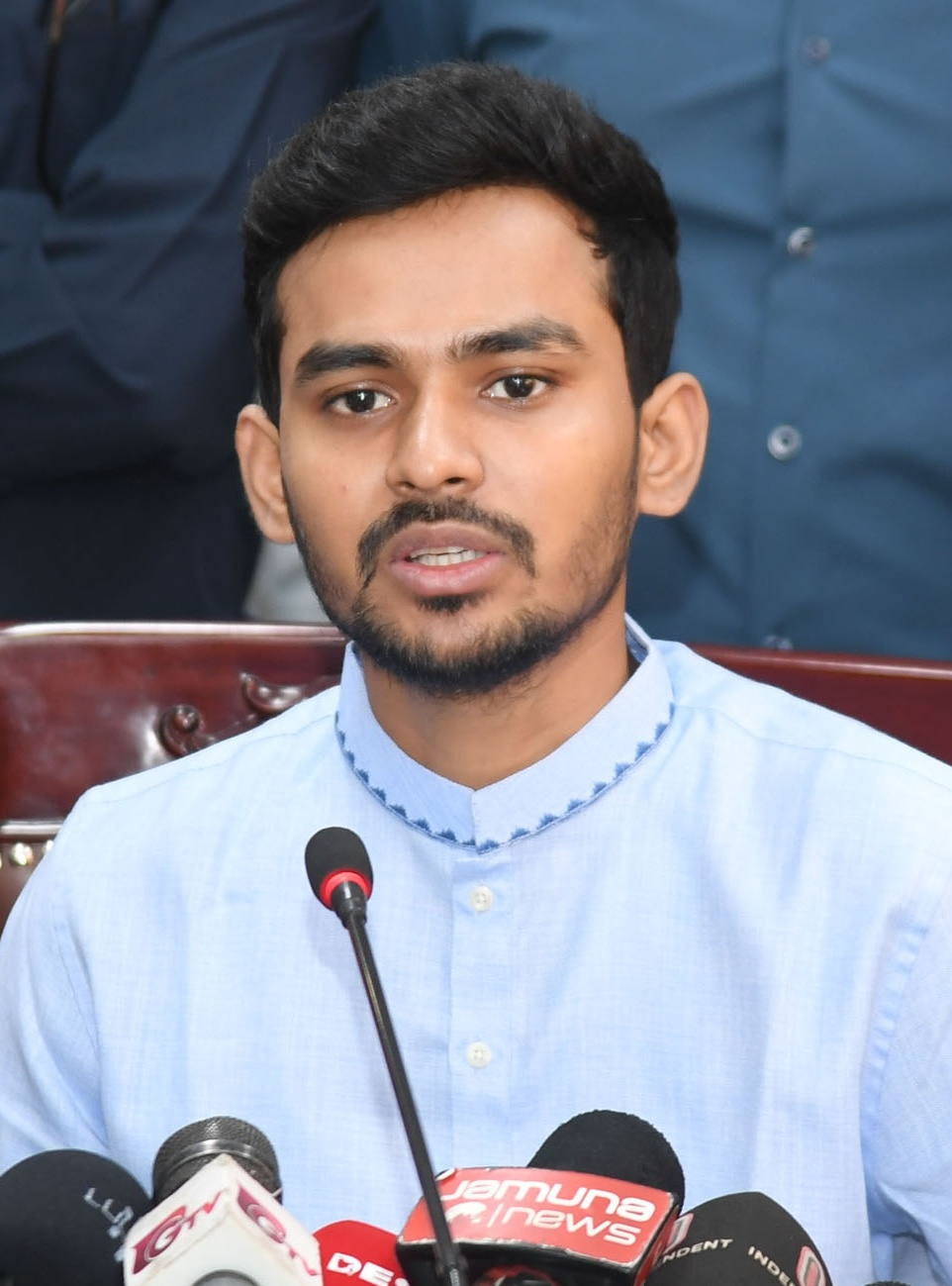
- Asif in 2024

Spokesperson of National Citizen Party
- Incumbent
- Assumed office 29 December 2025
- Convener: Nahid Islam
- Preceded by: Saleh Uddin Sifat

Adviser for Youth and Sports
- In office 9 August 2024 – 10 December 2025
- President: Mohammed Shahabuddin
- Chief Adviser: Muhammad Yunus
- Preceded by: Nazmul Hassan
- Succeeded by: Asif Nazrul

Adviser for Local Government, Rural Development, and Co-operatives
- In office 10 November 2024 – 10 December 2025
- President: Mohammed Shahabuddin
- Chief Adviser: Muhammad Yunus
- Preceded by: A. F. Hassan Ariff
- Succeeded by: Adilur Rahman Khan

Adviser for Labour and Employment
- In office 16 August 2024 – 10 November 2024
- President: Mohammed Shahabuddin
- Chief Adviser: Muhammad Yunus
- Preceded by: Md. Nazrul Islam Chowdhury
- Succeeded by: M Sakhawat Hussain

Personal details
- Born: Asif Mahmud Shojib Bhuiyan; 14 July 1998 (age 28) Aqubpur, Bangladesh
- Party: National Citizen Party
- Relations: Married
- Education: University of Dhaka; Adamjee Cantonment College; North South University
- Occupation: Politician

Asif Mahmud Shojib Bhuiyan (Bengali: আসিফ মাহমুদ সজীব ভুঁইয়া; born 14 July 1998) is a Bangladeshi politician, who was an adviser to the Interim government of Bangladesh. He was a key coordinator of the Students Against Discrimination, which led the July Uprising. He is also the former president of Bangladesh Chhatra Odhikar Parishad at University of Dhaka unit. Following his resignation from the interim government, he joined the National Citizen Party, where he serves as the party’s spokesperson. As an advisor to the Yunus government, facing allegations of corruption involving the laundering of 11,000 crore taka.

== Early life and education ==
Asif Mahmud was born on 14 July 1998 to a Bengali family of Muslim Bhuiyans in the village of Aqubpur in Bangra Upazila, Comilla District. He is the son of Mohammad Billal Hossain Bhuiyan and Rukhsana Begum. Mahmud studied at Nakhalpara Hossain Ali High School in Dhaka and completed his secondary education there. Afterwards, he studied at Adamjee Cantonment College, where he served as the Cadet Sergeant of the college's BNCC Club. He was a student of the 2017–18 academic session in the Department of Linguistics at the University of Dhaka. He is currently studying for a Master's degree at the North South University.

== Career ==
Asif Mahmud was one of the coordinators of the Students Against Discrimination opposing quotas in government jobs, which evolved into a campaign to remove Hasina from power. He along with Nahid Islam and others gained national recognition in mid-July 2024 when he and several other Dhaka University students were detained by police as the protests became violent.

In the aftermath, on August 5, Prime Minister of Bangladesh Sheikh Hasina resigned and fled the country. Nahid stated that their goals weren't fully met, and following Hasina's resignation, the group aimed to "abolish fascist systems forever". Asif Mahmud and his organisation called Nobel Laureate Muhammad Yunus to lead an interim government.

He began his career when he, along with another coordinator of the Students Against Discrimination, Nahid Islam, was appointed as an adviser in the Interim government of Bangladesh. In this capacity, he took on dual responsibilities, serving as the Adviser for Youth and Sports and overseeing the Labour and Employment. He was subsequently transferred from the Labour and Employment Ministry to the Local Government, Rural Development and Co-operatives on 10 November 2024.

== Political career ==
Asif Mahmud began his political involvement as a student activist and became a key coordinator of the Students Against Discrimination, a movement that led the July Uprising in Bangladesh. During the interim government period, he served as an adviser with responsibilities including youth and sports, labour and employment, and local government portfolios.

In early December 2025, he submitted his wealth statement and cancelled his diplomatic passport in preparation for participation in national politics following his resignation from the interim government. Shortly thereafter, he resigned from his advisory position on 10 December 2025, ending his tenure in the interim administration.

On 29 December 2025, he joined the National Citizen Party and was appointed its spokesperson as well as chief of the party’s election steering committee, choosing not to contest the upcoming general election himself.

== Controversies ==
=== Contractor Licence issued to father ===
In March 2025, Billal Hossain, father of Asif Mahmud, received a contractor license from the Local Government Engineering Department (LGED) in Comilla. Asif Mahmud initially denied knowledge of the license but later confirmed its authenticity, stating it was obtained without his consent and that no work had been undertaken using it. On April 24, 2025, the LGED Comilla district office officially cancelled the contractor license issued to Billal Hossain, citing procedural concerns.

=== Firearm magazine at airport ===
In June 2025, during a security check at Shahjalal International Airport, a firearm magazine was found in the hand luggage of Asif Mahmud. He was traveling to attend the OIC Youth Capital International program in Marrakech, Morocco. This caused controversy. Later, he stated on Facebook that the magazine had remained in his bag by mistake. He claimed that due to his involvement in political activities, he had been the target of multiple attacks, and that the licensed firearm was for his personal security. He further stated that due to shortcomings in state security, he legally carries a weapon to protect himself and his family.

Later Bangladesh’s Home Affairs Advisor, Lieutenant General (Retd.) Jahangir Alam Chowdhury sarcastically told reporters after a core committee meeting on law and order at the Secretariat, "It was a magazine, not an AK-47." He also said that an investigation is underway to determine how the magazine was not detected during the airport’s initial screening. According to Bangladesh’s firearms laws, officials holding positions equivalent to a minister are allowed to use firearms without age restrictions.

=== Money laundering allegation ===
On 17 September 2026, the Anti-Corruption Commission (ACC) initiated an investigation into Asif Mahmud Shojib Bhuyain. The allegations included money laundering, tender-related corruption, and financial irregularities regarding government appointments and development projects. Citing concerns that his departure could obstruct the inquiry, the commission announced plans to seek a travel ban against him. Mahmud denied the allegations, describing them as politically motivated.

== See also ==
- Yunus ministry
