= Akhter Hossen =

Bangladeshi politician

- আখতার হোসেন
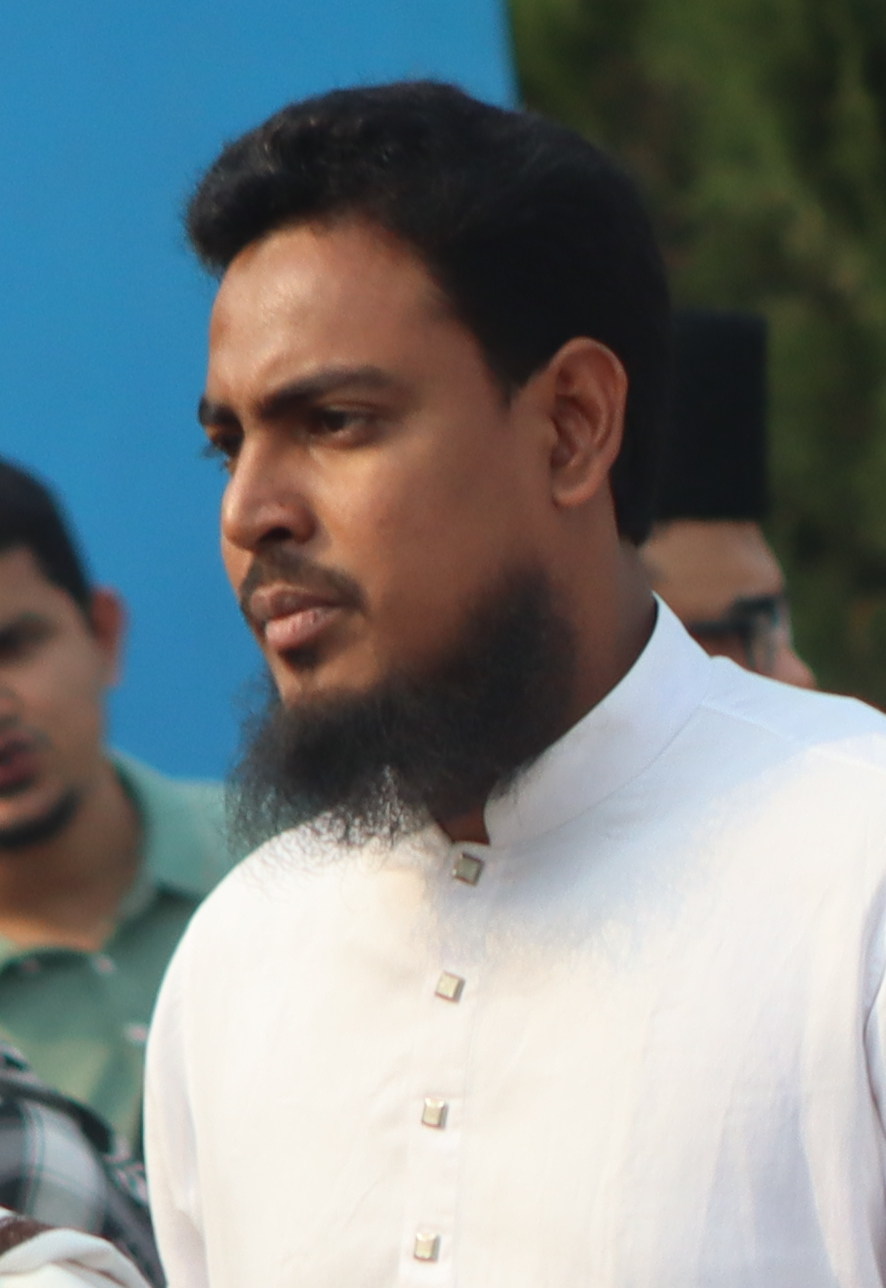
- Hossen in 2025

Member Secretary of National Citizen Party
- Incumbent
- Assumed office 28 February 2025
- Convener: Nahid Islam
- Preceded by: office established

Member of Parliament
- Incumbent
- Assumed office 17 February 2026
- Preceded by: Tipu Munshi
- Constituency: Rangpur-4

Convener of the Gonotantrik Chhatra Shakti
- In office 4 September 2023 – 14 September 2024
- Member Secretary: Nahid Islam
- Preceded by: position created
- Succeeded by: organisation dissolved

Personal details
- Born: 7 September 1997 (age 29) Kaunia, Rangpur
- Party: National Citizen Party
- Spouse: Sanjida Akhtar
- Education: University of Dhaka (LLB)
- Occupation: Politician, lawyer, activist

Akhter Hossen (Bengali: আখতার হোসেন) is a Bangladeshi politician and activist, currently serving as the member secretary of the National Citizen Party. Akhter Hossen was elected as a member of parliament in the 2026 Bangladeshi general election.

== Early life and education ==
Akhter Hossen pursued higher education at the University of Dhaka, where he studied law.

== Activism ==
Hossen first gained national attention in 2015 when he staged a solo hunger strike protesting against the question paper leak in university admission tests. In 2018, he played a key role in the Bangladesh quota reform movement, demanding fair policies in government job recruitment. In 2019, he was elected as the Social Services Secretary of the Dhaka University Central Students' Union (DUCSU). In 2024, he was one of the coordinators of the Students Against Discrimination, which led the initial quota reform movement, opposing quotas in government jobs and later evolving into a broader anti-government movement against the government. He was the founder of Gonotantrik Chhatra Shakti. He was also the member secretary of the Jatiya Nagorik Committee.

== Career ==
Following the mass uprising, the lead organisation and its coordinators started dialogue on initiating a new political party, and on 28 February 2025, the National Citizen Party was officially launched, with Hossen becoming the Member Secretary of the party.

Hossen became a Member of Parliament from Rangpur-4 constituency after contesting in the 2026 general election.
