= Students Against Discrimination =

Student activist group in Bangladesh

Students Against Discrimination বৈষম্যবিরোধী ছাত্র আন্দোলন
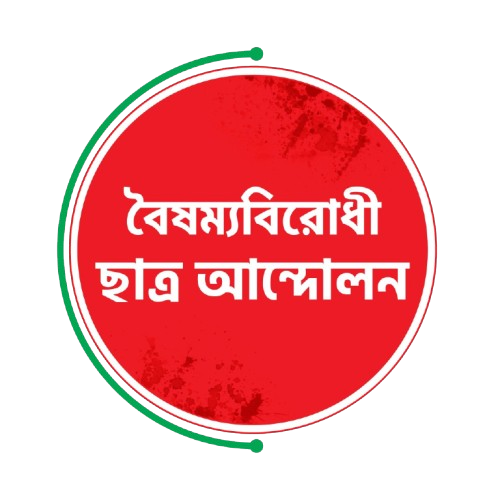
- Logo of Students Against Discrimination
- Founded: July 1, 2024; 2 years ago
- Headquarters: Veer Uttam C R Dutta Road, Hatirpool, Dhaka-1205, Bangladesh
- Ideology: Reformism; Egalitarianism; Social justice
- Position: Assistance to the Interim government
- National affiliation: National Citizen Party: Jatiya Nagorik Committee

Students Against Discrimination (Bengali: বৈষম্যবিরোধী ছাত্র আন্দোলন, romanized: Bôiṣômyôbirōdhī Chātrô Āndōlôn) is a platform of student activists in Bangladesh formed in 2024 during the nationwide student-led quota reform movement. The group was involved in the resignation of the country's prime minister, Sheikh Hasina, on 5 August 2024 which has ended the quota discrimination for students and young adults.

It is an umbrella organization which works on building the political range of Bangladesh, though it is a non-political organization.

On 22 October 2024, the Students Against Discrimination and the Jatiya Nagorik Committee jointly announced a "Five-Point Demand", advocating for sweeping political and constitutional changes to dismantle what they describe as a "fascist political settlement" and replace it with a democratic one.

In April 2026, the organization dissolved its central committee and transitioned to an advisory council structure comprising five advisors.

== History ==
The organisation was created on 1 July 2024. On 8 July 2024, it announced a 65-member committee, comprising 23 coordinators and 42 co-coordinators, to make the movement a success after its creation. On 3 August, after the agitation grew in scale, the group formed a 158-member coordination team with students from various educational institutions, of which 49 were coordinators and 109 were co-coordinators.

Since its inception, several coordinators have been seen leading the group, including Nahid Islam, Rifat Rashid, Sarjis Alam, Hasnat Abdullah, Asif Mahmud, Abu Baker Majumder, Arif Sohel, Ibrahim Nirob and among others.

The protesters under the banner of Students Against Discrimination announced their four-point demands on 1 July 2024, in support of reforms on Bangladesh Civil Service reservation quotas in Bangladesh. From 2 to 6 July, students of various institutions held protests including human chains and highway blockades across the country. On 7 July, the platform called for the "Bangla Blockade", under which students staged demonstrations, marches, civil disobedience and blockades of highways and railways.

One of the group's coordinators, Abu Sayed of Begum Rokeya University, Rangpur was shot and killed by the police on 16 July 2024.

The anti-discrimination student movement gained momentum when private university students joined on July 16. In response to the escalating quota reform movement, the government mandated the closure of all educational institutions on July 16, 2024. Subsequently, on 17 July, students residing in dormitories at public universities across the nation, including Dhaka University, were compelled to vacate their accommodations. However, due to the permanent residency of a significant portion of private university students in Dhaka, their presence within the city noticeably increased on July 18. Multiple confrontations occurred that day. Students affiliated with BRAC University and East West University clashed with law enforcement in the Rampura area; students from American International University-Bangladesh, North South University, Independent University, Bangladesh, Dhaka International University, and United International University staged demonstrations along Kuril Bishwa Road and Pragati Sarani. Simultaneously, protests were initiated by students from Ahsanullah University of Science and Technology, Bangladesh University of Textiles, and Southeast University in the Mohakhali area, from Northern University in the Uttara region and from International Islamic University Chittagong in Chittagong.

Protest organised by the Students Against Discrimination in Dhaka, 2024

On 26–28 July 2024, six front-line coordinators—Nahid Islam, Asif Mahmud, Abu Bakar Majumder, Sarjis Alam, Hasnat Abdullah, and Nusrat Tabassum—were detained by the Detective Branch of police. On 28 July at around 8:00 PM, these six coordinators were coerced into recording a video message from the DB office announcing the withdrawal of all protest programs. Rifat was among the four coordinators who remained free and immediately rejected the announcement. When asked why he opposed the withdrawal announcement, Rifat explained: "It wasn't about trust, it was about circumstances. They were taken to DB and forced to read a statement. It was obvious. Before being arrested, Asif Bhai had told us, 'Whoever is on the field will lead.' So we didn't accept that statement. I was scared then wondering if people would still listen to us. But we decided to reject the DB's announcement and continue the movement. That was a very difficult time." Alongside coordinators Abdul Kader, Abdul Hannan Masud, and Mahin Sarkar, Rifat declared that the six detained coordinators had been coerced and that the movement would continue. Rifat confirmed the release of the six detained coordinators on 1 August 2024 through a Facebook post. Following their release, the coordinators jointly stated that their video announcement from DB custody was not voluntary and that they had been forced to make the statement.

The group spearheaded a nationwide uprising, advocating for political change and successfully prompting the resignation of the Awami League leadership on August 5, 2024. On 8 August 2024, Nahid Islam and Asif Mahmud, two members of the group were appointed as advisers in the Interim government led by Muhammad Yunus. After the Yunus interim government took responsibility of Government of Bangladesh, the group announced a liaison committee to work on the new political arrangement. On the same day, it announced a new coordination team. As of August 2024, members of the organisation were suggesting the formation of a political party within a month.

=== Bangladesh Ganatantrik Chhatra Sangsad ===
Following the July Uprising, efforts began to form a new student organization. On 26 February 2025, the Bangladesh Ganatantrik Chhatra Sangsad (Bangladesh Democratic Student Council) was launched with Abu Bakar Majumder as convener.

On 27 February 2025, a 205-member central committee was announced. Rifat was appointed as senior joint member secretary. However, the same day, Rifat resigned from the newly formed organization citing personal reasons. Sources indicated that his resignation stemmed from dissatisfaction with his position, which did not align with his expectations.

=== Jatiya Jubo Shakti ===
On 16 May 2025, the National Citizen Party (NCP) launched its youth wing, Jatiya Jubo Shakti (National Youth Power), at Shaheed Abrar Fahad Avenue in Dhaka. A 131-member convening committee was announced, comprising representatives from all 64 districts of Bangladesh.

Advocate Tariqul Islam was appointed as convenor, Dr. Jahedul Islam as member secretary, and Engineer Forhad Sohel as chief organizer. Yasin Arafat was appointed as senior organizer working with the chief organizer.

In April 2026, Rifat Rashid officially joined the NCP's Jatiya Jubo Shakti as chief organizer, succeeding Forhad Sohel in the position. His appointment was announced through a message from the Anti-Discrimination Student Movement, confirming his transition into the National Citizen Party's organizational structure.

== Leadership ==
=== Central Convener Committee (October 2024 – June 2025) ===
On 22 October 2024, the organisation announced a four-member central convener committee during a press conference at the Shaheed Minar, Dhaka. Hasnat Abdullah was made convener, Arif Sohel member secretary, Abdul Hannan Masud chief organiser, and Umama Fatema the spokesperson of the committee.

=== Central Committee (June 2025 – April 2026) ===
On 25 June 2025, the Central Council formally announced the formation of a new committee. Rifat Rashid was elected as President, Md. Enamul Hasan as General Secretary, Muinul Islam as Organizing Secretary, and Sinthia Jaheen Ayesha as Spokesperson.

On 27 July 2025, President Rifat Rashid announced the suspension of all regional and district-level committees across Bangladesh amid extortion allegations against some coordinators, leaving only the central committee active. In an emergency press conference at Shahbagh, Rifat stated: "We have observed several incidents, including yesterday's, where individuals tried to misuse the SAD banner for unethical activities. We had warned from the beginning that such actions would not be tolerated. Unfortunately, under the influence of political parties, some members engaged in corrupt practices, which have now become nearly impossible for us to control." He urged law enforcement agencies to take legal action against those involved in such activities.

=== Advisory Council (April 2026 – present) ===
On 18 April 2026, the organization announced the dissolution of its central committee and the formation of a new advisory council structure. According to an official statement (Memo No: BEICHHAA/2025-26/), the organization restructured its leadership by abolishing all previous positions and forming a five-member advisory council to guide the platform's activities across approximately 30 educational institutions.

The advisory council members are:

- Abu Sayeed Liton
- Hamza Mahbub
- Tarikul Islam Nero
- Muinul Islam
- Shahadat Hosen

The statement noted that while approximately 30 educational institutions would be permitted to continue functioning under the Students Against Discrimination banner, all activities should be coordinated and approved by the advisory council.

== Controversy ==
Many members of the organization have been involved in the unlawful destruction and demolition of private property belonging to several political leaders and party offices, including the Jatiya Party (Ershad)'s offices and the ancestral home of its leader, Rowshan Ershad—carried out without any legal authority or official orders.

On 29 May 2025, leaders and activists of the Students Against Discrimination in Rangpur attacked the residence of Jatiya Party (Ershad) Chairman GM Quader and set his motorcycle on fire.

=== Extortion allegations and committee suspensions ===
On 26 July 2025, Gulshan police arrested five individuals, including four leaders associated with Students Against Discrimination, for allegedly attempting to extort Tk 50 lakh (5 million taka) from the family of former Awami League Member of Parliament Shammi Ahmed at her residence in Gulshan, Dhaka. The arrested individuals were Ibrahim Hossain Munna (Dhaka Metropolitan convener of Students Against Discrimination), Md. Sakadaun Siam, Sadman Sadab, and Abdur Razzak Riyad (a central committee member of the Democratic Student Council).

On 27 July 2025, at an emergency press conference in Shahbag, President Rifat Rashid announced the suspension of all regional and district-level committees across Bangladesh, leaving only the central committee active. Rifat stated,

We are witnessing various crimes being committed under the banner of the Student Against Discrimination Movement by individuals, both named and unnamed. Many of them, under political protection or having gone astray, are engaging in extortion and corruption, which has become difficult for us to control. Therefore, we are announcing the suspension of all committee activities, except for the central committee.

In January 2026, a controversy arose after Mahdi Hasan, Habiganj district member secretary of the movement, was recorded during a confrontation with police at Shaistaganj Police Station in which he claimed responsibility on behalf of the movement for burning down the Baniachong Police Station and for the killing of Sub-Inspector Santosh Chowdhury during July Uprising. The remarks were made while Mahdi was demanding the release of a detainee and were widely circulated on social media, prompting public criticism and police scrutiny. He was subsequently detained for a short period.

== Key people ==
=== Rifat Rashid ===
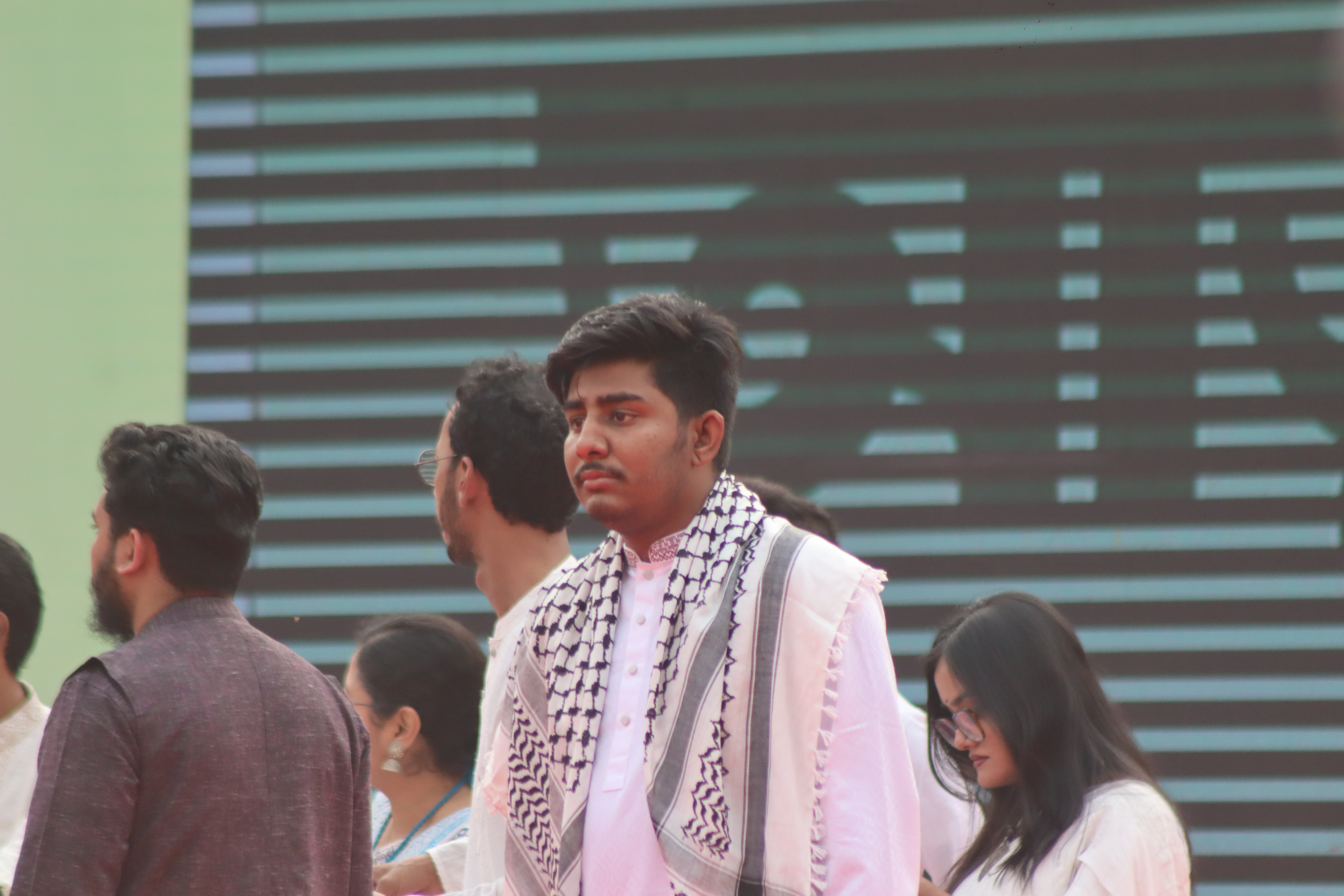
Launching event of the National Citizen Party 53.jpg

Mohammad Rashidul Islam Rifat (Bengali: মোহাম্মদ রশিদুল ইসলাম রিফাত), commonly known as Rifat Rashid (Bengali: রিফাত রশিদ), is a Bangladeshi student leader and political activist best known for his role in Students Against Discrimination. When six front-line coordinators were detained by the Detective Branch (DB) and forced to announce the withdrawal of the movement on 28 July 2024, Rifat was among the four coordinators who rejected the announcement and continued leading the protests, ultimately contributing to the fall of the Awami League government on 5 August 2024.

Rifat Rashid was born in Cumilla District, Bangladesh. He moved to Ashulia, on the outskirts of Dhaka. Rifat was admitted to Dhaka University in the 2020–21 session. Rifat became involved with Gonotantrik Chhatra Shakti (Democratic Student Force), a student organization formed on 4 October 2023 under the leadership of Akhter Hossen.

He is the chief organizer of Jatiya Jubo Shakti, the youth wing of the National Citizen Party (NCP). Before joining NCP, Rifat served as the president of Students Against Discrimination.

== July Martyrs' Day ==
Every year on 16 July, July Martyrs' Day is observed to commemorate the students who were killed during the movement. On this day, students who sacrificed their lives while protesting against discrimination in the education sector are remembered. The day is observed in honor of their sacrifice.

== See also ==
- July Uprising
- July Shaheed Smrity Foundation
- Jatiya Nagorik Committee
- Gonotantrik Chhatra Shakti
- Jatiya Chhatra Shakti
- Private University Students Alliance of Bangladesh
