= Jatiya Nagorik Committee =

Bangladeshi political platform

- জাতীয় নাগরিক কমিটি
- Formation: 8 September 2024; 23 months ago
- Purpose: Building consensus on rebuilding Bangladesh as an inclusive democracy
- Headquarters: Dhaka, Bangladesh
- Location: Bangladesh
- Convener: Nasiruddin Patwary
- Member Secretary: Akhter Hossen
- Chief Organizer: Sarjis Alam
- Spokesperson: Samantha Sharmin
- Affiliations: National Citizen Party: Students Against Discrimination
- Website: nagorikcommittee.org
- Remarks: সংহতি, প্রতিরোধ, পুনর্গঠন ("Solidarity, Resistance, Reformation")

The Jatiya Nagorik Committee (Bengali: জাতীয় নাগরিক কমিটি, lit. 'National Citizen's Committee') is a Bangladeshi political platform. The platform was formed in the aftermath of the July Uprising with a view to building consensus on rebuilding Bangladesh as an inclusive democracy following the resignation of Prime Minister Sheikh Hasina on 5 August 2024.

== Background ==
Students in Bangladesh began a quota reform movement in early June 2024 after the Bangladesh Supreme Court invalidated the government's 2018 circular regarding job quotas in the public sector. The movement escalated into a full-fledged mass uprising after the government carried out mass killings of protesters, known as the July massacre, by late July. By early August, the movement evolved into a Non-cooperation movement, ultimately leading to the ouster of the then-Prime Minister, Sheikh Hasina, on 5 August 2024. Hasina's ouster triggered a constitutional crisis, leading to the formation of an Interim government led by the country's only Nobel laureate, Muhammad Yunus, as the chief adviser. Shortly after the formation of the oath-taking to the government, the Jatiya Nagorik Committee was formed.

== Objectives ==
The central mission of the Jatiya Nagorik Committee is the reconstruction of Bangladesh as an inclusive democracy. Its members expressed strong opposition to the existing political settlement, describing it as authoritarian and oppressive. Among its founding objectives are building a equity-based new political settlement dismantling the old political settlement, ensuring justice for those involved in the July massacres and pushing for the demand for a constituent assembly election.

== Activities ==
On 22 October 2024, the Jatiya Nagorik Committee along with the Students Against Discrimination announced a "Five-Point Demand", advocating for sweeping political and constitutional changes to dismantle what they describe as a "fascist political settlement" and replace it with a "democratic one".

On 31 December 2024, along with the Students Against Discrimination, it initially wanted to give the July Declaration. But as the government took over the responsibility of doing this, it held "March of Unity", where they demamded the thing officially from the government what they wanted to give.

On 6–11 January 2025, it observed Proclamation Week to get the people's insights on the desired proclamation.

Under having affiliation of Students Against Discrimination, a new political party named National Citizen Party was revealed on 28 February 2025.

== See also ==
- July Uprising
