= 2025 Dhaka University Central Students' Union elections =

Students' union election in Dhaka University

2025 DUCSU election
- 9 September 2025
- Registered: 39,775
- Turnout: 73.42%
- Vice-President election
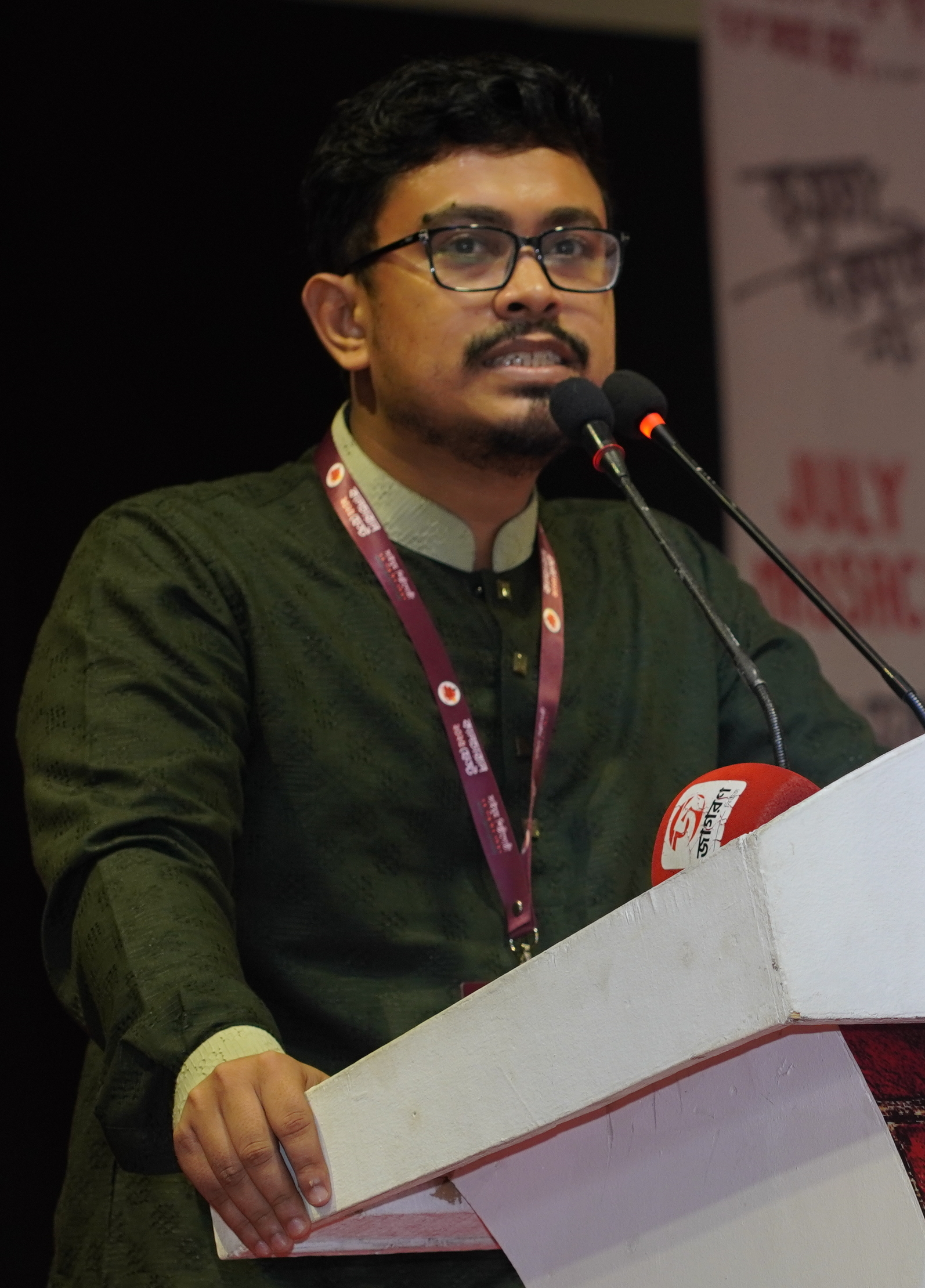

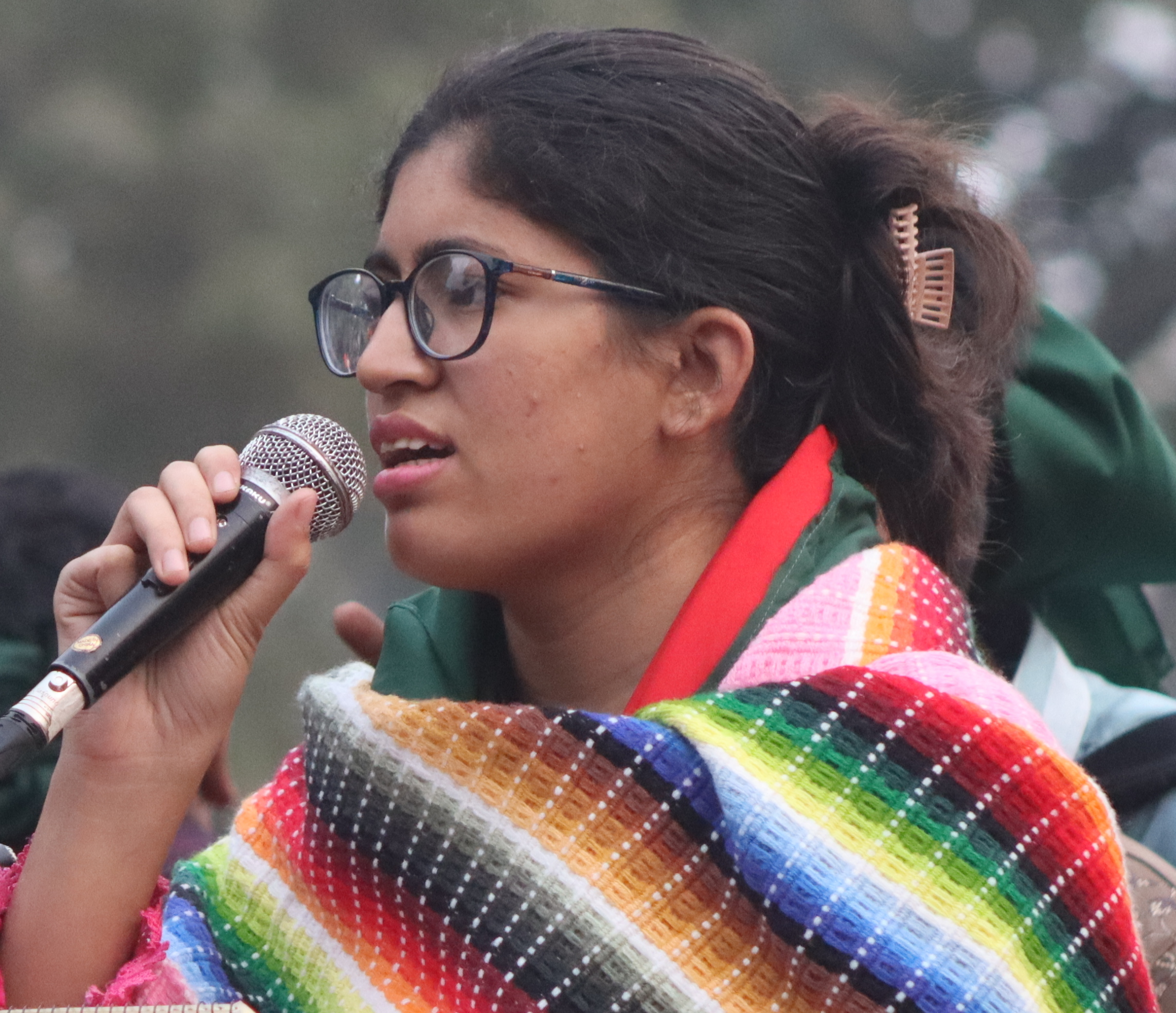
Candidate	Shadik Kayem	Abidul Islam Khan	Shameem Hossen
Party	BICS	BJCD	Independent
Alliance	USA	PBSU
Popular vote	14,042	5,708	3,883
Percentage	47.99%	19.51%	13.27%
Candidate	Umama Fatema	Abdul Kader
Party	Independent	BGCS
Alliance	ISU	ASC
Popular vote	3,389	1,103
Percentage	11.58%	3.77%
Vice-President before election
Nurul Haq Nur
BCOP
Vice-President
Shadik Kayem
BICS

Elections in Dhaka University Central Students' Union (DUCSU) in Dhaka University were held on 9 September 2025, which is the first major electoral decision marking student politics in Bangladesh after the July Revolution which ousted Sheikh Hasina and her party, the Awami League from power in 2024. Bangladesh Islami Chhatra Shibir-led United Students' Alliance (USA) won a landslide victory in the election, with Shadik Kayem of Shibir won as vice-president (VP), S M Farhad of Shibir as general secretary (GS) and Mohiuddin Khan of Shibir as assistant general secretary (AGS).

== History ==
The July Revolution ousted Sheikh Hasina and the Awami League government on 5 August 2024, resulting in the end of the 15-year-long domination of Bangladesh Chhatra League in Dhaka University. This resulted a push from various student organizations for reforms and further elections in DUCSU, which is often known as the second parliament of Bangladesh.

The previous DUCSU election, held on 11 March 2019, elected Nurul Haq Nur of Bangladesh Sadharon Chhatra Odhikar Songrokkhon Parishad, Golam Rabbani, and Saddam Hussain of BCL as the vice-president, the general secretary, and the additional general secretary of DUCSU, respectively. The 25-member central committee of DUCSU was heavily dominated by BCL affiliated representatives. After which, DUCSU elections were not held for the past few years.

On 8 August 2025, hundreds of students under the banner of 'general students' came out of the halls of DU protesting against the declaration of hall committees by the Jatiotabadi Chatra Dal. The protesters demanded prohibitions on hall-based politics on the campus, which the university authorities reportedly agreed. Student organizations expressed mixed views over the incident, with some claiming this as an attempt to establish "prohibition on hall politics" as a "populist demand" ahead of the polls. Later in a meeting with the vice-chancellor Niaz Ahmed Khan, most of the student organizations, except Bangladesh Ganatantrik Chhatra Sangsad and Bangladesh Chhatra Odhikar Parishad, supported continuing hall-based politics.

On the first day of the nomination papers collection, a student named Zulias Cizar Talukder secured a paper for VP candidacy, which sparked controversy as he previously served as general secretary of Salimullah Muslim Hall from the Chhatra League panel in the 2019 election. Later, he was removed from the voter list at the request of Salimullah Hall authorities, citing "allegations of student harassment" during the Awami League regime.

Poll Event	Schedule
Declaration of the schedule	29 July 2025
Publication of drafted voter list	30 July 2025
Last date for descent over the drafted voter list	6 August 2025
Publication of final voter list	11 August 2025
Deadline for nomination papers distribution	12–18 August 2025
Last date for the nomination papers submission	19 August 2025
Scrutiny of nomination	20 August 2025
Publication of primary candidacy list	21 August 2025
Last date for withdrawal of nomination	25 August 2025
Publication of final candidacy list	26 August 2025
Date of poll	9 September 2025
Date of counting of votes	9–10 September 2025

== Candidates ==
Panels of competing student organization in the election
Alliance	Vice President	Organization(s)
Alliance	General Secretary	Organization(s)
Alliance	Assistant General Secretary	Organization(s)
United Students' Alliance	Shadik Kayem	Bangladesh Islami Chhatra Shibir
United Students' Alliance	S M Farhad	Bangladesh Islami Chhatra Shibir
United Students' Alliance	Mohiuddin Khan	Bangladesh Islami Chhatra Shibir
Anti-discrimination Students' Council	Abdul Kader	Bangladesh Ganatantrik Chhatra Sangsad
Anti-discrimination Students' Council	Abu Baker Mazumder	Bangladesh Ganatantrik Chhatra Sangsad
Anti-discrimination Students' Council	Ashrefa Khatun	Bangladesh Ganatantrik Chhatra Sangsad
Pro-Bangladesh Students' Unity	Md Abidul Islam Khan	Bangladesh Jatiotabadi Chatradal
Pro-Bangladesh Students' Unity	Sheikh Tanvir Bari Hamim	Bangladesh Jatiotabadi Chatradal
Pro-Bangladesh Students' Unity	Tanvir Al Hadi Mayed	Bangladesh Jatiotabadi Chatradal
Independent Students' Unity	Umama Fatema	Independent
Independent Students' Unity	Al Sadi Bhuiyan	Independent
Independent Students' Unity	Jahid Ahmed	Independent
Pratirodh Parshad	Sheikh Tasnim Afroze Emi	Independent
Pratirodh Parshad	Meghmallar Basu	Bangladesh Students' Union
Pratirodh Parshad	Md. Jabir Ahmed Jubel	Revolutionary Students Unity of Bangladesh
DUCSU For Change	Bin Yamin Molla	Bangladesh Chhatra Odhikar Parishad
DUCSU For Change	Sabina Yasmin	Bangladesh Chhatra Odhikar Parishad
DUCSU For Change	Rakibul Islam	Bangladesh Chhatra Odhikar Parishad
Conscious Students' Council	Yasin Arafat	Islami Chhatra Andolan Bangladesh
Conscious Students' Council	Khairul Ahsan Marzan	Islami Chhatra Andolan Bangladesh
Conscious Students' Council	Saif Mohammad Alauddin	Islami Chhatra Andolan Bangladesh
Integrated Student's Council	Jalaluddin Muhammad Khalid	Swadhin Bangladesh Chhatra Sangsad
Integrated Student's Council	Md. Mahin Sarkar (Note: Sarkar dropped out and endorsed Abu Baker Mazumder of the 'Anti-discrimination Students' Council' panel.)	National Citizen Party (expelled)
Integrated Student's Council	Fateha Sharmin Anny	Laxmipur District Students Welfare Society
Unvanquished 71–Impressible 24	Md. Naim Hasan	Jasad Chhatra League
Unvanquished 71–Impressible 24	Anamul Hasan Oyon	Bangladesh Students' Union
Unvanquished 71–Impressible 24	Aditi Islam	Socialist Students' Front

=== Others ===
In addition, Sanjida Ahmed Tonni, who was injured in the 2024 mass uprising, took nomination for the post of Research and Publication Secretary. In support of her, the "Pro-Bangladesh Students' Unity", "Pratirodh Parshad" and "Unvanquished 71–Impressible 24" did not fill any candidate for the post and endorsed her.

== Results ==
=== Central committee ===
Party	Seats	+/–
Bangladesh Islami Chhatra Shibir	16	▲16
Bangladesh Islami Chhatri Sangstha	2	▲2
Inqilab Moncho	1	New
United People's Bangladesh	1	New
Pahari Chhatra Parishad	1	▲1
Independent (Note: 3 independent members are affiliated with the USA)	7	▲7
Total	28	–

Elected Central Committee 2025–2026
Elected Candidate	Designation	Organization	Panel	Votes
Shadik Kayem	Vice-president	Bangladesh Islami Chhatra Shibir	United Students Alliance	14,042
S M Farhad	General Secretary	Bangladesh Islami Chhatra Shibir	United Students Alliance	10,794
Muhammad Mohiuddin Khan	Assistant General Secretary	Bangladesh Islami Chhatra Shibir	United Students Alliance	11,772
Fatema Tasnim Juma	Liberation War and Democratic Movement Secretary	Inqilab Moncho	United Students Alliance	10,631
Umme Salma	Common Room, Reading Room and Cafeteria Secretary	Independent	United Students Alliance	9,920
Jashimuddin Khan	International Affairs Secretary	Independent	United Students Alliance	9,706
Musaddiq Ali Ibne Mohammad	Literature and Culture Secretary	Independent	Unaffiliated	7,782
Md Iqbal Haider	Science and Technology Secretary	Bangladesh Islami Chhatra Shibir	United Students Alliance	7,833
Sanjida Ahmed Tonni	Research and Publications Secretary	Independent	Unaffiliated	11,778
Arman Hossain	Sports Secretary	Bangladesh Islami Chhatra Shibir	United Students Alliance	7,255
Asif Abdullah	Student Transport Secretary	Bangladesh Islami Chhatra Shibir	United Students Alliance	9,061
Zubair Bin Nesary	Social Welfare Secretary	Independent	Unaffiliated	7,608
MM Al Minhaz	Health and Environment Secretary	UP Bangladesh	United Students Alliance	7,038
Md Jakaria	Human Rights and Legal Secretary	Bangladesh Islami Chhatra Shibir	United Students Alliance	11,747
Md Mazharul Islam	Career Development Secretary	Bangladesh Islami Chhatra Shibir	United Students Alliance	9,344
Sabikunnahar Tamanna	Executive Member	Bangladesh Islami Chhatri Sangstha	United Students Alliance	10,084
Sorbo Mitra Chakma	Executive Member	Bangladesh Islami Chhatra Shibir	United Students Alliance	8,988
Imran Hossain	Executive Member	Bangladesh Islami Chhatra Shibir	United Students Alliance	6,256
Mosammat Afsana Akter	Executive Member	Bangladesh Islami Chhatri Sangstha	United Students Alliance	5,747
Tazinur Rahman	Executive Member	Bangladesh Islami Chhatra Shibir	United Students Alliance	5,690
Raihan Uddin	Executive Member	Bangladesh Islami Chhatra Shibir	United Students Alliance	5,082
Md Miftahul Hossain Al Maruf	Executive Member	Bangladesh Islami Chhatra Shibir	United Students Alliance	5,015
Anas Ibn Munir	Executive Member	Bangladesh Islami Chhatra Shibir	United Students Alliance	5,015
Hema Chakma	Executive Member	Pahari Chhatra Parishad	Pratirodh Parshad	4,908
Md Belal Hossain Apu	Executive Member	Bangladesh Islami Chhatra Shibir	United Students Alliance	4,865
Md Raisul Islam	Executive Member	Bangladesh Islami Chhatra Shibir	United Students Alliance	4,865
Md Shahinur Rahman	Executive Member	Bangladesh Islami Chhatra Shibir	United Students Alliance	4,390
Umma Uswatun Rafia	Executive Member	Independent	Unaffiliated	4,209

=== Vice-President election ===
Candidate	Party	Votes	%
Shadik Kayem	Bangladesh Islami Chhatra Shibir	14,042	47.99
Abidul Islam Khan	Bangladesh Jatiotabadi Chatra Dal	5,708	19.51
Shameem Hossen	Independent	3,883	13.27
Umama Fatema	Independent	3,389	11.58
Abdul Kader	Bangladesh Ganatantrik Chhatra Sangsad	1,103	3.77
Md. Jamal Uddin Khalid	Swadhin Bangladesh Chhatra Sangsad	503	1.72
Bin Yamin Molla	Bangladesh Chhatra Odhikar Parishad	136	0.46
Sheikh Tasnim Afroz Emi	Independent (PP)	68	0.23
Yasin Arafat	Islami Chhatra Andolan Bangladesh	62	0.21
Others		365	1.25
Total		29,259	100.00
Source: Dhaka University Syndicate

Vice-President election
Shadik	47.99%
Abidul	19.51%
Shameem	13.27%
Umama	11.58%
Kader	3.77%
Khalid	1.72%
Bin Yamin	0.46%
Emi	0.23%
Yasin	0.21%
Others	1.25%

=== General Secretary election ===
Candidate	Party	Votes	%
S M Farhad	Bangladesh Islami Chhatra Shibir	10,794	37.64
Sheikh Tanvir Bari Hamim	Bangladesh Jatiotabadi Chatra Dal	5,283	18.42
Meghmallar Basu	Bangladesh Students' Union	4,949	17.26
Arafat Chowdhury	Independent	4,044	14.10
Abu Baker Mazumder	Bangladesh Ganatantrik Chhatra Sangsad	2,131	7.43
Md. Ashikur Rahman	Independent	526	1.83
Al Sadi Bhuiyan	Independent	271	0.95
Md. Khairul Ahsan Marzan	Islami Chhatra Andolan Bangladesh	163	0.57
Sabina Yasmin	Bangladesh Chhatra Odhikar Parishad	148	0.52
Others		368	1.28
Total		28,677	100.00
Source: Dhaka University Syndicate

General Secretary election
Forhad	37.64%
Hamim	18.42%
Meghmallar	17.26%
Arafat	14.10%
Abu Baker	7.43%
Ashikur	1.83%
Sadi	0.95%
Marzan	0.57%
Sabina	0.52%
Others	1.28%

=== Assistant General Secretary election ===
Candidate	Party	Votes	%
Mohiuddin Khan	Bangladesh Islami Chhatra Shibir	11,772	41.64
Tanvir Al Hadi Mayed	Bangladesh Jatiotabadi Chatra Dal	5,064	17.91
Tahmid Al Muddassir	Independent	3,006	10.63
Md. Jabir Ahmed Jubel	Revolutionary Students Unity of Bangladesh	1,511	5.34
Mohiuddin Rony	Independent	1,137	4.02
Ashrefa Khatun	Bangladesh Ganatantrik Chhatra Sangsad	900	3.18
Md. Ashikur Rahman Jim	Independent	796	2.82
Fateha Sharmin Anny	Laxmipur District Students Welfare Society	501	1.77
Hasib Al-Islam	Independent	500	1.77
Sanjana Afifa Aditi	Independent	373	1.32
Aditi Islam	Socialist Students' Front	367	1.30
Farhad Hossain	Independent	366	1.29
Rakibul Islam	Bangladesh Chhatra Odhikar Parishad	277	0.98
Mahiuddin Abid	Independent	253	0.89
Zahed Ahmad	Independent	242	0.86
Akash Biswas Emu	Independent	222	0.79
Syed Md. Samir Faiyaz	Independent	211	0.75
Armanul Haq	Independent	186	0.66
Ala Uddin	Islami Chhatra Andolan Bangladesh	136	0.48
Ahnaf Hossain Chowdhury Adil	Independent	83	0.29
Others		367	1.30
Total		28,270	100.00
Source: Dhaka University Syndicate

Assistant General Secretary election
Mohiuddin	41.64%
Mayed	17.91%
Tahmid	10.63%
Jubel	5.34%
Rony	4.02%
Ashrefa	3.18%
Jim	2.82%
Anny	1.77%
Hasib	1.77%
Aditi	1.32%
Aditi	1.30%
Farhad	1.29%
Rakibul	0.98%
Abid	0.89%
Zahed	0.86%
Emu	0.79%
Faiyaz	0.75%
Armanul	0.66%
Alauddin	0.48%
Adil	0.29%
Others	1.30%

=== By polling station ===
Polling Station	Student Hall	Candidate	Post	Votes	Percentage
Curzon Hall	Amar Ekushey Hall	Abu Sadiq Kayem	DUCSU VP	644	62.95%
Curzon Hall	Amar Ekushey Hall	Abidul Islam Khan	DUCSU VP	141	13.78%
Curzon Hall	Amar Ekushey Hall	Umama Fatima	DUCSU VP	90	8.80%
Curzon Hall	Amar Ekushey Hall	Shamim Hossain	DUCSU VP	111	10.85%
Curzon Hall	Amar Ekushey Hall	Abdul Quader	DUCSU VP	36	3.52%
Curzon Hall	Amar Ekushey Hall	Bin Yamin Molla	DUCSU VP	1	0.10%
Curzon Hall	Amar Ekushey Hall	Farhad Hossain	GS	466	56.39%
Curzon Hall	Amar Ekushey Hall	Megh Mallar Basu	GS	86	10.40%
Curzon Hall	Amar Ekushey Hall	Abu Baker Majumder	GS	147	17.79%
Curzon Hall	Amar Ekushey Hall	Tanvir Bari Hamim	GS	180	21.78%
Curzon Hall	Fazlul Huq Muslim Hall	Abu Sadiq Kayem	DUCSU VP	841	65.02%
Curzon Hall	Fazlul Huq Muslim Hall	Abidul Islam Khan	DUCSU VP	181	13.99%
Curzon Hall	Fazlul Huq Muslim Hall	Umama Fatima	DUCSU VP	153	11.83%
Curzon Hall	Fazlul Huq Muslim Hall	Shamim Hossain	DUCSU VP	141	10.90%
Curzon Hall	Fazlul Huq Muslim Hall	Abdul Quader	DUCSU VP	47	3.63%
Curzon Hall	Fazlul Huq Muslim Hall	Bin Yamin Molla	DUCSU VP	6	0.46%
Curzon Hall	Fazlul Huq Muslim Hall	Farhad Hossain	GS	589	47.11%
Curzon Hall	Fazlul Huq Muslim Hall	Megh Mallar Basu	GS	99	7.92%
Curzon Hall	Fazlul Huq Muslim Hall	Abu Baker Majumder	GS	341	27.28%
Curzon Hall	Fazlul Huq Muslim Hall	Tanvir Bari Hamim	GS	228	18.25%
Curzon Hall	Shahidullah Hall	Abu Sadiq Kayem	DUCSU VP	966	66.88%
Curzon Hall	Shahidullah Hall	Abidul Islam Khan	DUCSU VP	199	13.78%
Curzon Hall	Shahidullah Hall	Umama Fatima	DUCSU VP	140	9.70%
Curzon Hall	Shahidullah Hall	Shamim Hossain	DUCSU VP	161	11.14%
Curzon Hall	Shahidullah Hall	Abdul Quader	DUCSU VP	56	3.88%
Curzon Hall	Shahidullah Hall	Bin Yamin Molla	DUCSU VP	6	0.42%
Curzon Hall	Shahidullah Hall	Farhad Hossain	GS	773	58.55%
Curzon Hall	Shahidullah Hall	Megh Mallar Basu	GS	125	9.47%
Curzon Hall	Shahidullah Hall	Abu Baker Majumder	GS	241	18.26%
Curzon Hall	Shahidullah Hall	Tanvir Bari Hamim	GS	249	18.85%
TSC	Ruqayyah Hall	Abu Sadiq Kayem	DUCSU VP	1,472	
TSC	Ruqayyah Hall	Shamim Hossain	DUCSU VP	684	
TSC	Ruqayyah Hall	Umama Fatema	DUCSU VP	614	
TSC	Ruqayyah Hall	Abidul Islam Khan	DUCSU VP	575	
TSC	Ruqayyah Hall	S M Farhad	GS	1,120	
TSC	Ruqayyah Hall	Arafat Chowdhury	GS	664	
TSC	Ruqayyah Hall	Megh Mallar Bosu	GS	780	
TSC	Ruqayyah Hall	Tanvir Bari Hamim	GS	447	
TSC	Ruqayyah Hall	Abu Baker Mojumdar	GS	241	
TSC	Shamsunnahar Hall				
University Laboratory School	Shamsunnahar Hall	Abu Sadiq Kayem	DUCSU VP	1,114	
University Laboratory School	Shamsunnahar Hall	Abidul Islam Khan	DUCSU VP	434	
University Laboratory School	Shamsunnahar Hall	Umama Fatema	DUCSU VP	403	
University Laboratory School	Shamsunnahar Hall	Shamim Hossain	DUCSU VP	412	
University Laboratory School	Shamsunnahar Hall	Abdul Kader	DUCSU VP	59	
University Laboratory School	Shamsunnahar Hall	Bin Yamin Molla	DUCSU VP	4	
University Laboratory School	Shamsunnahar Hall	S M Farhad	GS	814	
University Laboratory School	Shamsunnahar Hall	Meghmallar Bosu	GS	517	
University Laboratory School	Shamsunnahar Hall	Abu Baker Majumdar	GS	132	
University Laboratory School	Shamsunnahar Hall	Tanvir Bari Hamim	GS	312	
Physical Education Centre	Jagannath Hall	Abidul Islam Khan	DUCSU VP	1,276	
Physical Education Centre	Jagannath Hall	Abu Sadiq Kayem	DUCSU VP	10	
Physical Education Centre	Jagannath Hall	Umama Fatema	DUCSU VP	278	
Physical Education Centre	Jagannath Hall	Abdul Kader	DUCSU VP	21	
Physical Education Centre	Jagannath Hall	Bin Yamin Molla	DUCSU VP	5	
Physical Education Centre	Jagannath Hall	Shamim Hossain	DUCSU VP	171	
Physical Education Centre	Jagannath Hall	Tasnim Afroze Emi	DUCSU VP	11	
Physical Education Centre	Jagannath Hall	Meghmallar Bosu	GS	1,170	
Physical Education Centre	Jagannath Hall	S M Farhad	GS	5	
Physical Education Centre	Jagannath Hall	Tanvir Bari Hamim	GS	398	
Physical Education Centre	Jagannath Hall	Arafat Chowdhury	GS	169	
Physical Education Centre	Jagannath Hall	Abu Baker Mojumdar	GS	27	
Physical Education Centre	Shahid Sergeant Zahurul Huq Hall				
Physical Education Centre	Salimullah Muslim Hall				
Geology Department	Begum Sufia Kamal Hall	Abu Sadiq Kayem	DUCSU VP	1270	
Geology Department	Begum Sufia Kamal Hall	Abidul Islam Khan	DUCSU VP	423	
Geology Department	Begum Sufia Kamal Hall	Umama Fatima	DUCSU VP	547	
Geology Department	Begum Sufia Kamal Hall	Shamim Hossain	DUCSU VP	485	
Geology Department	Begum Sufia Kamal Hall	Abdul Quader	DUCSU VP	55	
Geology Department	Begum Sufia Kamal Hall	Bin Yamin Molla	DUCSU VP	0	
Geology Department	Begum Sufia Kamal Hall	S M Farhad	GS	964	
Geology Department	Begum Sufia Kamal Hall	Meghmallar Bosu	GS	507	
Geology Department	Begum Sufia Kamal Hall	Arafat Chowdhury	GS	498	
Geology Department	Begum Sufia Kamal Hall	Tanvir Bari Hamim	GS	402	
Geology Department	Begum Sufia Kamal Hall	Abu Bakar Mojumdar	GS	216	
ULAB School/Senate Building	Sir A.F. Rahman Hall	Abu Sadik Kayem	DUCSU VP	602	
ULAB School/Senate Building	Sir A.F. Rahman Hall	Abidul Islam Khan	DUCSU VP	186	
ULAB School/Senate Building	Sir A.F. Rahman Hall	Umama Fatema	DUCSU VP	79	
ULAB School/Senate Building	Sir A.F. Rahman Hall	Abdul Kader	DUCSU VP	91	
ULAB School/Senate Building	Sir A.F. Rahman Hall	Shamim Hossain	DUCSU VP	122	
ULAB School/Senate Building	Sir A.F. Rahman Hall	S M Farhad	GS	588	
ULAB School/Senate Building	Sir A.F. Rahman Hall	Meghmallar Bosu	GS	157	
ULAB School/Senate Building	Sir A.F. Rahman Hall	Abu Baker Mojumdar	GS	54	
ULAB School/Senate Building	Sir A.F. Rahman Hall	Tanvir Bari Hamim	GS	245	
ULAB School/Senate Building	Haji Muhammad Mohsin Hall				
ULAB School/Senate Building	Bijoy Ekattor Hall				
Udayan School	Kabi Jasimuddin Hall	Abu Sadik Kayem	DUCSU VP	647	
Udayan School	Kabi Jasimuddin Hall	Abidul Islam Khan	DUCSU VP	187	
Udayan School	Kabi Jasimuddin Hall	Umama Fatema	DUCSU VP	62	
Udayan School	Kabi Jasimuddin Hall	Abdul Kader	DUCSU VP	55	
Udayan School	Kabi Jasimuddin Hall	Shamim Hossain	DUCSU VP	94	
Udayan School	Kabi Jasimuddin Hall	Bin Yamin Molla	DUCSU VP	4	
Udayan School	Kabi Jasimuddin Hall	S M Farhad	GS	540	
Udayan School	Kabi Jasimuddin Hall	Tanvir Bari Hamim	GS	255	
Udayan School	Kabi Jasimuddin Hall	Megh Mallar Bosu	GS	81	
Udayan School	Kabi Jasimuddin Hall	Abu Baker Majumdar	GS	67	
Udayan School	Surja Sen Hall				
Udayan School	Muktijoddha Ziaur Rahman Hall	Abu Sadik Kayem	DUCSU VP	674	
Udayan School	Muktijoddha Ziaur Rahman Hall	Abidul Islam Khan	DUCSU VP	248	
Udayan School	Muktijoddha Ziaur Rahman Hall	Umama Fatema	DUCSU VP	151	
Udayan School	Muktijoddha Ziaur Rahman Hall	Shamim Hossain	DUCSU VP	131	
Udayan School	Muktijoddha Ziaur Rahman Hall	Abdul Kader	DUCSU VP	70	
Udayan School	Muktijoddha Ziaur Rahman Hall	S M Farhad	GS	544	
Udayan School	Muktijoddha Ziaur Rahman Hall	Tanvir Bari Hamim	GS	334	
Udayan School	Muktijoddha Ziaur Rahman Hall	Meghmallar Bosu	GS	176	
Udayan School	Jatir Janak Bangabandhu Sheikh Mujibur Rahman Hall				
Udayan School	Source:				

=== Turnout ===
Location	Turnout (%)
Curzon Hall	87.34%
Physical Education Centre	83.3%
TSC	69%
Dhaka University Club	70%
Udayan School	83%
Geology Department	66.48%
University Laboratory School	65.25%
ULAB School/Senate Building	63%
Average	73.42%
Source: The Business Standard

== Reactions ==
Following the victory of Islami Chhatra Shibir-backed panel in the major three posts, the Jamaat-e-Islami Pakistan posted on their Facebook page congratulating the organisation. However, the post was later deleted.

Indian politician and chairman of the Parliamentary Standing Committee on External Affairs, Shashi Tharoor, expressed his concerns over Chhatra Shibir's victory on Twitter. Bangladesh Students' Union General Secretary candidate, Meghmallar Basu, criticized his remarks claiming it to be "fueling the far-right in Bangladesh", accusing him of unintentionally serving as a public relations agent for Bangladesh Jamaat-e-Islami.

== See also ==
- Student politics of Bangladesh
- Elections in Bangladesh
- 2026 Bangladeshi general election
