= 2021 Bangladesh anti-Modi protests =

Protests against the visit of Narendra Modi to Bangladesh

- Date: 19–29 March 2021
- Location: Bangladesh
- Caused by: Arrival of Prime Minister Narendra Modi in Bangladesh during the country's celebrations of its 50th anniversary of independence.
- Goals: To cancel the invitation of Prime Minister Narendra Modi
- Methods: Demonstrations, stone pelting, rioting
- Result: Riots and protests suppressed

Parties
Communist Party of Bangladesh; Bangladesh Students' Union; Gono Odhikar Parishad; Bangladesh Chhatra Odhikar Parishad; Socialist Party of Bangladesh; Socialist Students' Front; Students Federation of Bangladesh; Hefazat-e-Islam Bangladesh	Government of Bangladesh; Bangladesh Police; Border Guard Bangladesh; Awami League; Bangladesh Chhatra League; Jubo League

Lead figures
Decentralised leadership	Sheikh Hasina; Obaidul Quader

Casualties and losses
17 dead, 500 injured (Protesters' claim); 14 dead (Media claim)	

A series of rallies, demonstrations, and blockades opposing the visit of Indian Prime Minister Narendra Modi for the celebrations of the birth centenary of Sheikh Mujibur Rahman and the 50th anniversary of Bangladesh's independence from Pakistan were held in Bangladesh from 19 to 29 March 2021. Accusing Narendra Modi of committing crimes against humanity during the 2002 Gujarat riots, the protesters agitated against what they alleged were anti-Muslim policies and interference in Bangladeshi politics. Protesters demanded the cancellation of the Bangladesh government's invitation to the Indian Prime Minister. The otherwise peaceful protests turned violent when the protesters were attacked by supporters of the ruling Awami League party, along with a crackdown by law enforcement agencies, causing the deaths of several protesters throughout the last week of March 2021. Initially launched by progressive student organisations including the Bangladesh Students' Union, Bangladesh Chhatra Odhikar Parishad, and the Socialist Students' Front, the demonstrations were later joined by Hefazat-e-Islam Bangladesh.

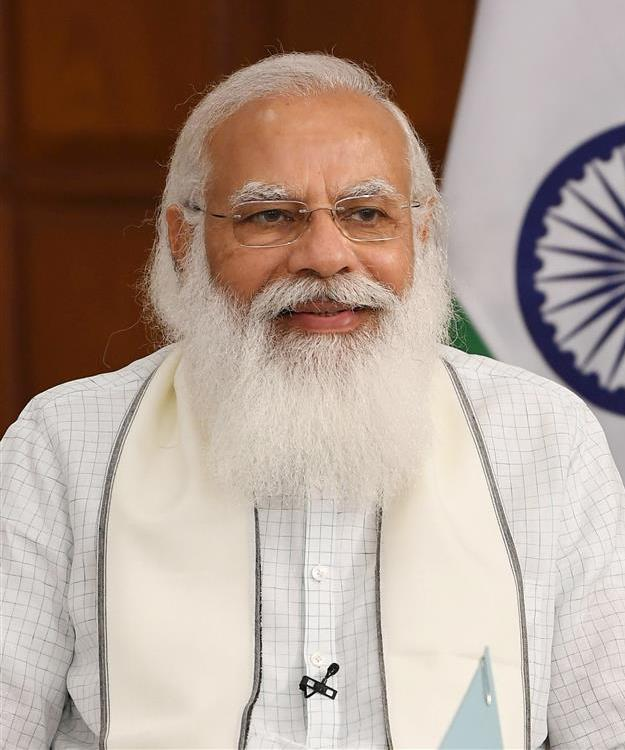
Narendra Modi, the Prime Minister of India in 2021

The deadly conflict chiefly began when supporters of the Awami League tried to stop the protesters from waving their shoes at Modi as a sign of discontent at Baitul Mukarram mosque, Dhaka. This resulted in violent clashes involving both sides. After the incident, the violence spread to several key districts in the country, leading to damage to public property.

Amnesty International, in a statement on 26 March 2021, criticized the Bangladesh government for using excessive force on the protesters and urged the government to "respect the right to freedom of assembly and protect peaceful protesters". Following the killings of its supporters on Friday, Hefazat called a strike protesting the killing of its activists by police and the attack on them by supporters of the ruling party on Sunday, 28 March. "Police opened fire on our peaceful supporters," the group's organizing secretary Azizul Haque told a rally in Chittagong. "We will not let the blood of our brothers and sisters go in vain." The clashes resulted in at least 14 deaths and many injuries, with Brahmanbaria alone accounting for 10 deaths.

== Background ==
Bangladesh declared independence from Pakistan on 26 March 1971, with the diplomatic and military support of India. The 50th occurrence of 26 March since then marked the golden jubilee of Bangladesh's independence; to celebrate the day, the Bangladesh government invited the Prime Minister of India, Narendra Modi. Soon after the Indian prime minister decided to join the celebration, Bangladeshi students and Islamists vowed to resist him from visiting Bangladesh.

The former vice-president of the Dhaka University Central Students' Union, Nurul Haq Nur, in a rally in front of the Press Club on 12 March 2021, termed Narendra Modi the "Butcher of Gujarat" and said that he was unwelcome in Bangladesh. On the other hand, the police chief of Bangladesh declared restrictions on movement during the visit of foreign guests, including the Indian premier, on 15 March 2021. He also requested political parties not to hold programmes during the visit of Narendra Modi.

On 18 March 2021, progressive student organisations declared a series of protests against the visit of Narendra Modi to Bangladesh, including rallies, demonstrations, effigy burnings, and torch marches. On the same day, leaders of the Awami League government-backed student wing Bangladesh Chhatra League (BCL), who have been accused of hooliganism and terrorism, declared they would deal with the protesters and threatened to 'peel off the skin' of whoever protests.

== Timeline of protest ==
The first demonstration against the visit of Narendra Modi was held on 19 March 2021, and they have continued since. Bangladesh Police, as well as ruling party-backed organisations Bangladesh Chhatra League, Jubo League, and Bangladesh Awami Swechasebak League, swooped on the protesters, triggering violence and retaliation from the protesters.

=== 19 March ===
- Hundreds of Muslims protested the forthcoming visit of Narendra Modi and called for resisting the Indian premier at a rally that came out of the national mosque Baitul Mukarram in Dhaka.
- Around 200 students affiliated with the progressive students' alliance rallied inside the University of Dhaka and asked Modi not to come.

=== 23 March ===
- Bangladesh Chhatra League members snatched the effigy of Narendra Modi from the activists of the Student Federation of Bangladesh when they tried to burn it, and then fled the scene.
- Activists of the progressive students' alliance were attacked in front of the Dhaka University's Teacher-Student Centre when they tried to burn the effigy of Narendra Modi, and Bangladesh Chhatra League members snatched it away once again. A clash erupted when they fought back against the members of the Chhatra League led by Atanu Barman and Ahesun Dhrubo. Around 20 students from the student group, including female activists, were beaten by BCL members.
- Journalists who were covering the attack on the anti-Modi protesters were brutally attacked by BCL-backed individuals.

=== 26 March ===
- Muslims gathered after the Friday prayer at the Baitul Mukarram mosque at noon and chanted slogans against Narendra Modi. Armed cadres of BCL and Jubo League, who took position around the place before the prayer, backed by police, attacked the protesters inside the compound of the mosque, triggering a violent chase and counter-chase. Police started shooting rubber bullets, targeting the protesters. Many protesters were beaten, and some received bullet injuries. At least 148 people received treatment in a Dhaka hospital after the attack.
- The attack in Baitul Mukarram infuriated students at Hathazari of Chittagong, a stronghold of Islamist students. Students came out in the street to protest the attack on their fellows. The demonstration was obstructed by police while passing the Hathazari Police Station. Angry protesters started attacking police stations and public property, prompting police to open fire. Four protesters died in the process.
- One youth protester died in Brahmanbaria when Islamist Hefazat activists attacked the railway station and other adjacent government buildings in protest of the attack on Muslims in Baitul Mukarram.

=== 27 March ===
- Four villagers of Brahmanbaria were shot dead by local police and BGB personnel in Brahmanbaria when they attempted to block the highway in protest of the death of Hefazat activists.
- Armed cadres of Awami League and Chhatra League attacked a madrasa at Brahmanbaria, killing a student inside.
- Six police officers were injured as anti-Modi protesters attacked a police station in Faridpur. The attack was aimed to disrupt the return to Dhaka from Gopalganj and Khulna, where Modi visited temples and the mausoleum of Bangabandhu. The police fired rubber bullets to disperse the mob.
- More than 26 policemen were injured during an attack by protesters at the Aruail police camp. According to the police and locals, several thousand madrasa students, accompanied by locals, attacked the camp.

=== 28 March ===
- During the hartal called by Hefazat supporters on Sunday in protest against the killings of its protesters by police firing, Hefazat activists brought out processions in the capital's Lalbagh, Paltan, Baitul Mukarram, Mohammadpur, Basila, Sat Masjid, and Jatrabari areas in the morning.
- Hartal supporters attacked trains and government offices. "Brahmanbaria is burning", a journalist in Brahmanbaria town told Reuters by phone. Hefazat activists burned the music school and museum of Ustad Alauddin Khan. They attacked the biggest Hindu temple in Brahmanbaria district during Dol Purnima puja. They also attacked homes and offices of Awami League leaders in Brahmanbaria.
- Hefazat activists vandalized the Muktijoddha Complex Bhaban, Public Library, and Land Office in Brahmanbaria. Brahmanbaria municipality was forced to stop providing all services to residents as a result of the violence.
- Two activists of Hefazat died after a clash with police in Brahmanbaria.
- Hindu temples were also attacked, according to media reports.

=== 29 March ===
- The situation was said to have calmed down as daily life resumed by 7:25 pm local time. Facebook and Messenger, which were taken down during the protests, resumed operation from that time.

== Deaths ==
On 28 March, after the strike, Hefazat leaders claimed in a press conference that 17 people had died across the country, with around 500 people receiving injuries during the protests. According to their claim, 12 people died in Brahmanbaria, four at Hathazari in Chittagong, and one at the Signboard area in Narayanganj. Local news outlets, however, have reported 14 deaths as of 28 March 2021.

== Arrests ==
During and after the protests, opposition activists were detained and kept in undisclosed detention. According to the activists, they were tortured in custody. Shakil Uzzaman and Mina Al Mamun, the joint-convenors of Bangladesh Chhatra Odhikar Parishad, were picked up in suspicious circumstances from the capital Dhaka's Savar area on 26 March. On the next day, the joint convenor of Bangladesh Jubo Odhikar Parishad, Nadim Hasan, was abducted from the Lalbagh area by people who identified themselves as police. Two leaders of the same organisation were picked up, respectively, from Rajshahi and Sylhet, reportedly by law enforcers, and remained untraceable on 28 March. After more than 24 hours of detention at unknown places, Nadim Hasan, Shakil Uzzaman, Mina Al Mamun, and Md Mazharul Islam were placed in court and charged with violence. More than 100 Islamists were arrested by Bangladesh police during 12 April – 19 April over alleged participation in the violence.

== Reaction ==
To stop the spread of news and cut off communication across the country, the government of Bangladesh blocked Facebook on 26 March, from the afternoon. Facebook, in a statement, stated that "We are aware that our services have been restricted in Bangladesh." "We're working to understand more and hope to have full access restored as soon as possible," they added.

International rights group Amnesty International termed the Bangladesh government's response to the protest as a "Bloody Crackdown" and said, "The Bangladeshi authorities must respect the right to freedom of assembly and protect peaceful protestors."

Twenty eminent citizens of Bangladesh demanded punishment for those responsible for attacking anti-Modi protestors and carrying out violence in Chittagong's Hathazari, in a joint statement. Among them were M Hafizuddin Khan, Ali Imam Majumder, Anu Muhammad, Badiul Alam Majumdar, Syeda Rizwana Hasan, Sara Hossain, CR Abrar, Zafrullah Chowdhury, Asif Nazrul, Shahidul Alam, Hasnat Quaiyum, Nur Khan Liton, Shireen Huq, Jakir Hossain, Perween Hasan, Lubna Marium, Sharmeen Murshid, Firdous Azim, Naila Zaman Khan, and Rahnuma Ahmed.

Bangladesh's main opposition party, the Bangladesh Nationalist Party, protested the killing of people on the country's Independence Day for protesting the visit of a foreign national. They declared a countrywide demonstration on 29 March and 30 March.

Prominent Hefazat leader Abdual Awal resigned; the decision was said to have been taken due to differences of opinion with other Hefazat leaders during the protests.

== Compensation ==
In October 2025 for Local Government and Rural Development, Asif Mahmud Sajib Bhuiyan provided financial assistance worth Taka 7.7 crore to the families of those killed during the Shapla Square massacre and the anti-Modi protests.

== See also ==
- GoBackModi
