= 2019 Dhaka University Central Students' Union elections =

2019 student union election in Bangladesh

2019 DUCSU election
- 11 March 2019
- Vice-President election
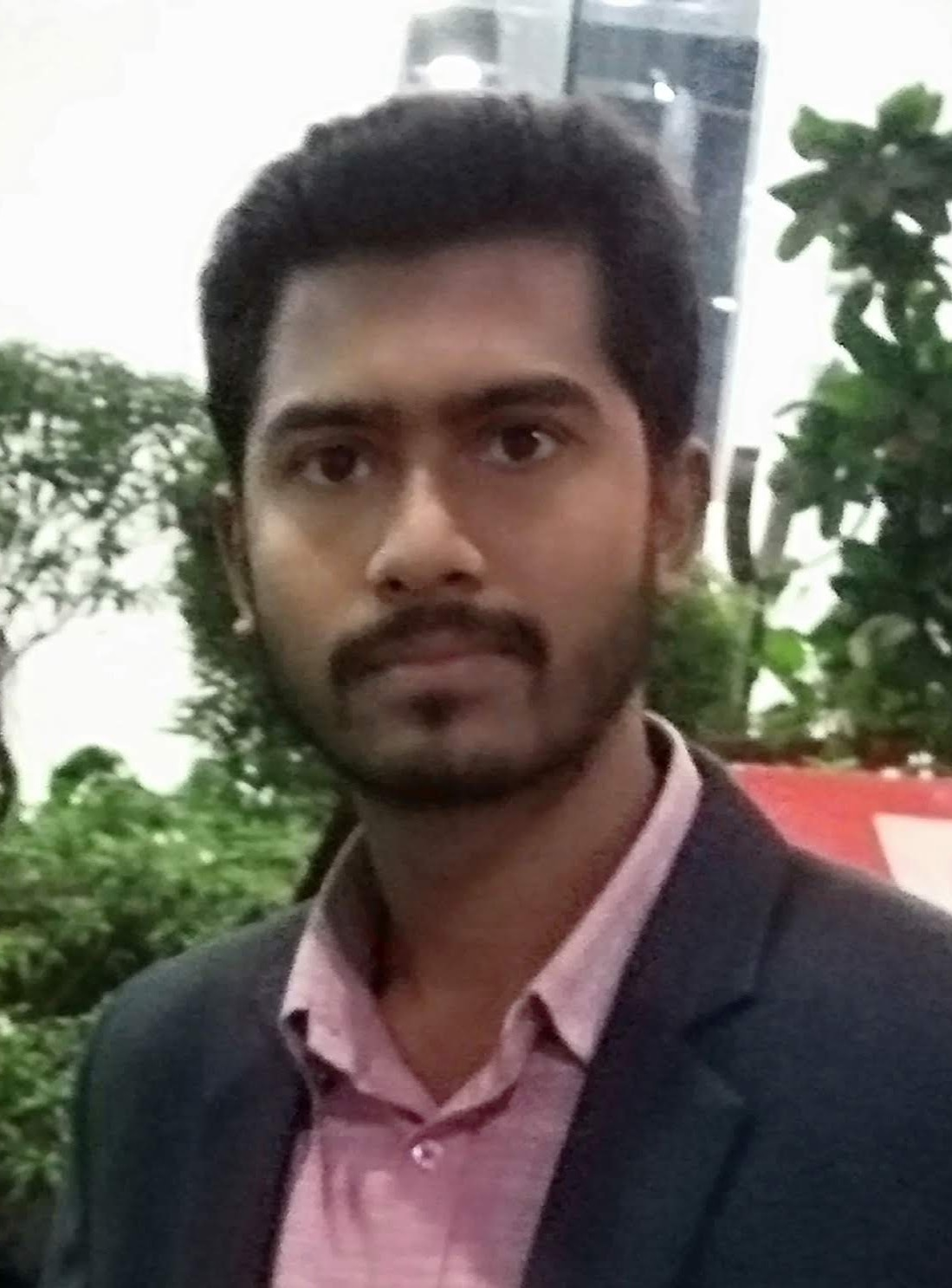
Candidate	Nurul Haq Nur	Rezwanul Haque Chowdhury
Party	BSCOSP	BCL
Alliance		Combined Students' Council
Running mate	Rashed Khan & Faruk Hasan	Golam Rabbani & Saddam Hussain
Popular vote	11,062	9,129
Vice-President before election
Amanullah Aman
JCD
Vice-President
Nurul Haq Nur
BSCOSP

Elections in Dhaka University Central Students' Union (DUCSU) held on 11 March 2019, following the High Court rulings of 2018. Nurul Haq Nur of Bangladesh Sadharon Chhatra Odhikar Songrokkhon Parishad won as vice-president, Golam Rabbani of Bangladesh Chhatra League won as general Secretary and Saddam Hussain also of Bangladesh Chhatra League won as Assistant General Secretary.

== Background ==
Following a writ petition, the High Court Division of Bangladesh directed Dhaka University to hold DUCSU election in 2018. Per orders, DUCSU election was scheduled to be held on 11 March 2019.

== Election ==
S M Mahfujur Rahman, a professor of International Business Department was appointed as the chief returning officer in accordance with the clause 8(e) of DUCSU constitution. Five returning officers were appointed to assist the chief returning officer, and a 7-member disciplinary committee was formed to overlook disciplinary issues.

Though all student organizations except Chhatra League demanded the polling booth to be located outside the residential halls, the DU syndicate decided that the polling booths be in the residential halls.

== Panels ==
Panels of competing student organization in the election
Position	Bangladesh Sadharan Chhatra Adhikar Sangrakshan Parishad	Bangladesh Chhatra League	Progressive Alliance	Bangladesh Jatiotabadi Chatra Dal	Islami Sasontontro Chhatra Andolan	Bangladesh Chhatra Maitri
Vice-president	Nurul Haq Nur	Rezwanul Haque Chowdhury	Liton Nandi	Mohammad Mustafizur Rahman	S. M. Ataye Rabbi	Mohammad Russell Sheikh
General Secretary	Rashed Khan	Golam Rabbani	Foysal Mahmud Sumon	Mohammad Anisur Rahman	Mahmudul Hasan	Shonom Siddiqui Shiti
Assistant General Secretary	Faruk Hasan	Saddam Hussain	Sadekul Islam	Khorsed Alam Sohel	H. M. Shariat	Sanjida Bari

== Results ==
Party	Seats	+/–
BCL	23	+23
BSCOSP	2	New
Total	25	–
Source: Prothom Alo

== See also ==
- Student politics of Bangladesh
- Elections in Bangladesh
