= Saddam Hussain (Chhatra League) =

Bangladeshi student activist

- সাদ্দাম হোসেন
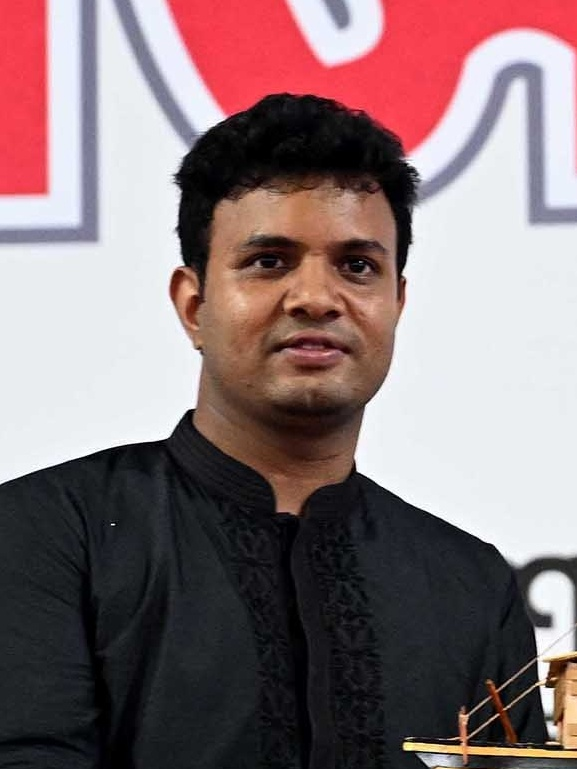
- Saddam Hussain in 2023

President of Bangladesh Chhatra League
- In Exile
- Assumed office 20 December 2022
- General Secretary: Sheikh Wali Asif Enan
- Preceded by: Al-Nahean Khan Joy

Assistant General Secretary of Dhaka University Central Students' Union
- In office 11 March 2019 – 2021
- President: Mohammed Akhtaruzzaman
- Vice President: Nurul Haque Nur
- Preceded by: Nazimuddin Alam
- Succeeded by: Muhammad Mohiuddin Khan

Member of the Senate of the University of Dhaka
- In office 2020–2023

Personal details
- Born: Boda, Panchagarh, Rangpur, Bangladesh
- Party: Bangladesh Awami League
- Education: Notre Dame College; University of Dhaka
- Occupation: Student activism

Saddam Hussain (Bengali: সাদ্দাম হোসেন) is a Bangladeshi political student activist who has been serving as the president of the Bangladesh Chhatra League (BCL), the student wing of the Bangladesh Awami League since 2022. He previously held the position of general secretary of the BCL’s University of Dhaka unit. In 2019, he was elected assistant general secretary of the Dhaka University Central Students' Union (DUCSU), and became a member of the University of Dhaka Senate in the same year.

Hussain reportedly left Bangladesh and is presently residing in Kolkata, India following the resignation of Sheikh Hasina as the prime minister of the country. He has since been convicted in several cases including crimes against humanity, and corruption by the interim government and had been sentenced to death in absentia in 2026.

== Early life and education ==
Hussain was born in Panchagarh, Rangpur Division of Bangladesh. His father, Md. Aminul Haque, formerly served as president of an Upazila unit of both the Bangladesh Chhatra League and the Bangladesh Awami Jubo League.

He has finished his secondary education at Thakurgaon Government High School in 2008, followed by higher secondary studies at Notre Dame College, Dhaka. He later enrolled in the Department of Law at the University of Dhaka.

== Political career ==
Hussain became active in student politics through the Bangladesh Chhatra League, where he served as Deputy Secretary of Legal Affairs in the organisation's Central Executive Committee.

Following the organisation's Dhaka University unit council held on 29 April 2018, he was elected general secretary of the university unit.

In the 2019 Dhaka University Central Students' Union (DUCSU) election, he was elected assistant general secretary with 15,301 votes. He later served as president of the Bangladesh Chhatra League and was nominated as a member of the University of Dhaka Senate.

Despite the existence of formal hall administrations at the university, effective control over student residential halls was widely alleged to rest with the Bangladesh Chhatra League during Husain's tenure as general secretary. The organization was accused of exercising parallel authority by influencing or determining seat allocations in the halls. He proposed resolution at the University of Dhaka banning student organisations based on religion.

When DUCSU's extended tenure ended in June 2020, DUCSU VP Nurul Haque Nur sought a further extension, but Hussain opposed it and decided not to continue as DUCSU AGS further, calling continuation beyond the constitutional term without elections "immoral and undemocratic".

=== July uprising and aftermath ===
During Hussain's leadership of the BCL, activists from the organisation were reported to have been instructed to suppress demonstrators involved in the quota reform movement of 2024. The violent clashes between protesters, Chhatra League members, and the Bangladesh Police became known as the July massacre. Hussain stated that he supported the "logical demands" of the movement but warned that action would be taken against "Razakars" whom he accused of politicising the protests.

Following the ousting of Sheikh Hasina, the interim government of Bangladesh initiated legal proceedings against individuals associated with the Hasina administration in connection with alleged abuses. Hussain was among those who left Bangladesh for India, reportedly via Sylhet.

Hussain, along with 127 other students, was later expelled from the University of Dhaka for their affiliation with Bangladesh Chhatra League (BCL). The interim government subsequently banned the Bangladesh Chhatra League for its activities during the premiership of Sheikh Hasina under the anti-terrorism act. Hussain also faced charges of attempted murder in connection with an alleged attack on Jatiyatabadi Chhatra Dal leaders in 2022.

Hussain criticized the interim government, stating that it lacked "legal, democratic, or moral legitimacy." He opposed its decision to ban the Bangladesh Chhatra League, describing the move as politically motivated and asserting that the organization would continue its activities despite the ban. He also accused the interim authorities of attempting to shift responsibility for violence onto his organization.

In November 2025, he gave an interview to an Indian media outlet regarding Hasina's death sentence; the setting of the interview drew some public attention on social media.
