= Student politics of Bangladesh =

The Student politics of Bangladesh encompasses the activities and culture among Bangladeshi students, mostly from the tertiary level of education, as part of the support they demonstrate for political parties at the national level.

== Major student organizations ==
Name of Organization	Flag	Founded	Website	President	General Secretary
Bangladesh Islami Chhatra Shibir		February 6, 1977	shibir.org.bd	Nurul Islam Saddam	Sibgatullah Sibga
Bangladesh Jatiotabadi Chatra Dal		January 1, 1979	bnpbd.org/chatra-dal	Rakibul Islam Rakib	Nasir Uddin
Bangladesh Students' Union		April 26, 1952	bsu1952.org.bd	Mahir Shahriar Reza	Bahauddin Shuvo
Islami Chhatra Andolan Bangladesh		August 23, 1991	chhatraandolan.org/	Muntasir Ahmad	Sultan Mahmud
Bangladesh Islami Chhatra Sena		January 21, 1980	www.chattrasena.org	Muhammad Joynul Abedin	Muhammad Jaber
Socialist Students' Front		January 21, 1984	spb.org.bd	Raihan Uddin	Mukta Barai
Bangladesh Chhatra Maitri		December 6, 1980	studentsunitybd.com	Atulon Das Alo	Aditi Adrita Srishti
Jatiya Chhatra Shakti		February 26, 2025		Abu Baker Mazumdar	Tahmid Al Muddasir Chowdhury
Islami Chhatrasena		January 21, 1980	chattrasena.com	Md. Farid Mazumder	Md. Emdadul Islam
Jatiya Chhatra Samaj		March 27, 1983	jcsbd.org	Md. Al Mamun	Md. Ashraful Islam Khan
Chhatra Jamiat Bangladesh		January 24, 1992		Ridwan Mazhari	Saad Bin Zakir
Students Against Discrimination		July 1, 2024		Rashidul Islam Rifat	Md. Enamul Hasan
Student Federation of Bangladesh		January 10, 1985	studentsfederationbd.org	Mashiur Rahman Khan Richard	Saikat Arif
Revolutionary Student Unity		December 6, 1980		Shahriar Khandaker Alif	Toyob Islam
Bangladesh Chhatra Odhikar Parishad		February 17, 2018		Nazmul Hasan	Sanaullah Hoque
Bangladesh Islami Chhatra Majlis		January 5, 1990	https://chhatra-majlis.org.bd/	Khaled Saifullah	Tarik Bin Habib
Democratic Students' Council		January 16, 2021		Saiedul Hoq Nissan	Fahim Ahmed Chowdhury
Students Unity of Bangladesh		December 6, 1980	studentsunitybd.com	Faruk Ahmed Rubel	Kazi Abdul Motaleb Jewel
Revolutionary Student-Youth Movement		November 24, 1983	andolanpotrika.com	Tawfika Priya	
Bangladesh Students' Party		June 16, 2023			
Bangladesh Islami Chhatri Sangstha		July 15, 1978	islamichhatrisangstha.org	Muhtaramah Munjia	
Bangladesh Khelafat Chhatra Majlis		May 29, 2009		Mohammad Abdul Aziz	

Others include:

- Bangladesh Islami Chattra Sena
- Bangladesh Chhatra Pakkha

Banned organizations include:

Name of Organization	Flag	Founded	Website	President	General Secretary
Bangladesh Chhatra League (Banned)		January 4, 1948		Saddam Hussain	Sheikh Wali Asif Enan

== Current situation ==
Student politics in Bangladesh is reactive, confrontational, and violent. Student organizations act as armaments of the political parties they are part of. So every now and then there are affrays and commotions. Over the years, political clashes and factional feuds in universities killed many, seriously interfering with academics. Women harassment is also a major problem of student politics. To relieve tensions, universities often must resort to lengthy closures, resulting in truncated and overcrowded classes.

The student wings of ruling parties run campuses and residence halls through crime and violence. They control access to amenities in residence halls, favoring fellow party members and loyal pupils; eat for free from nearby restaurants, and help themselves to products from shops nearby; practice extortion; and take money from freshmen. Further, they put pressure on teachers for payment in exchange for supporting to school administration their hiring and retention.

On 23 October, 2024, The Ministry of Home Affairs in Public Security Division has issued a gazette notification announcing a ban on the Bangladesh Chhatra League, invoking provisions of the Anti-Terrorism Act, 2009, with specific reference to the student wing of Bangladesh Awami League role in the July massacre.
