= Uttara High School and College =

- উত্তরা হাই স্কুল এন্ড কলেজ

Location
- Road# 1 & 27; Sector# 7, Uttara; Dhaka, 1230; Bangladesh
- 23.8709°N 90.3974°E

Information
- Established: 1985
- Status: Open
- School board: Dhaka Education Board
- School code: EIIN 108538, School 1377, College 1146
- Chairman: Md Abdur Rouf
- Principal: Md Faridur Rahman (Acting)
- Grades: I-XII
- Gender: Girls (Morning shift); Boys (Day shift)
- Age range: 7–18
- Enrollment: 25,000+
- Language: Bengali
- Campus size: 2.32 acres (9,400 m^{2})
- Campus type: Urban
- Sports: Cricket and football
- Website: uhsc.edu.bd

Uttara High School and College (UHSC; Bengali: উত্তরা হাই স্কুল এন্ড কলেজ) is a Bangladeshi primary school, secondary school, and higher secondary school (grades I-XII) a few metres from the Dhaka-Mymensingh Road (Asian Highway). It is situated in the heart of Uttara Model Town at Sector- 07 about two kilometers from the Shahjalal International Airport.

== History ==
The school was established in 1985.

In the Junior School Certificate (JSC) exams, the school placed eighth in 2010 and seventeenth in 2011, among schools under the Dhaka Board of Intermediate and Secondary Education.

== Campus ==
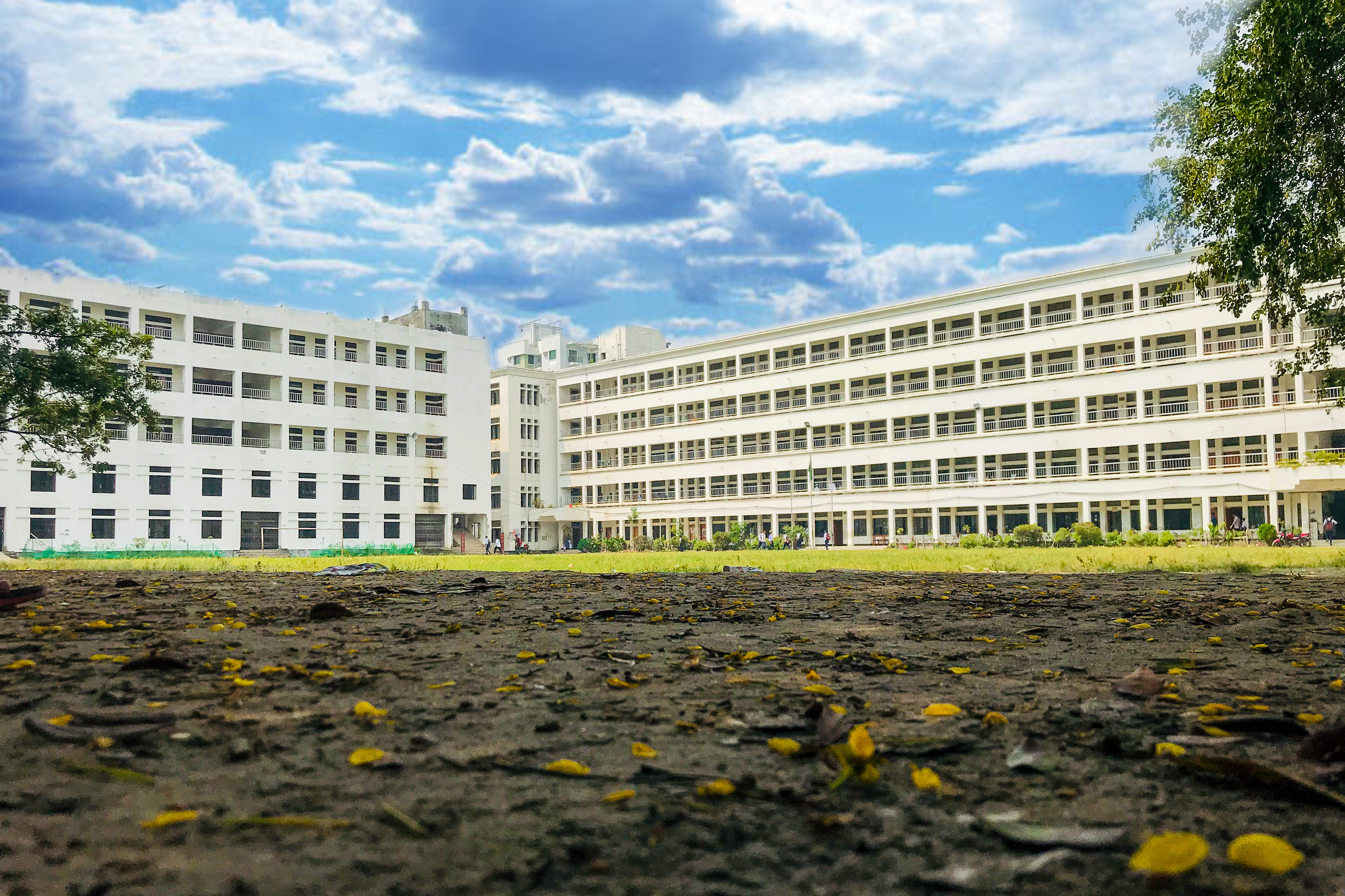
Uttara High School and College in 2018

Uttara High School and College's campus is 2.32 acres (9,400 m2). It has a ground field for students.

== Notable alumni ==
- Mahiya Mahi, film actress
- Mir Mugdho, student activist killed during the 2024 Bangladesh quota reform movement
- Nurul Haq Nur, vice president of the Dhaka University Central Students' Union (2019–2020)
