= Rashed Khan =

Bangladeshi politician

- রাশেদ খাঁন
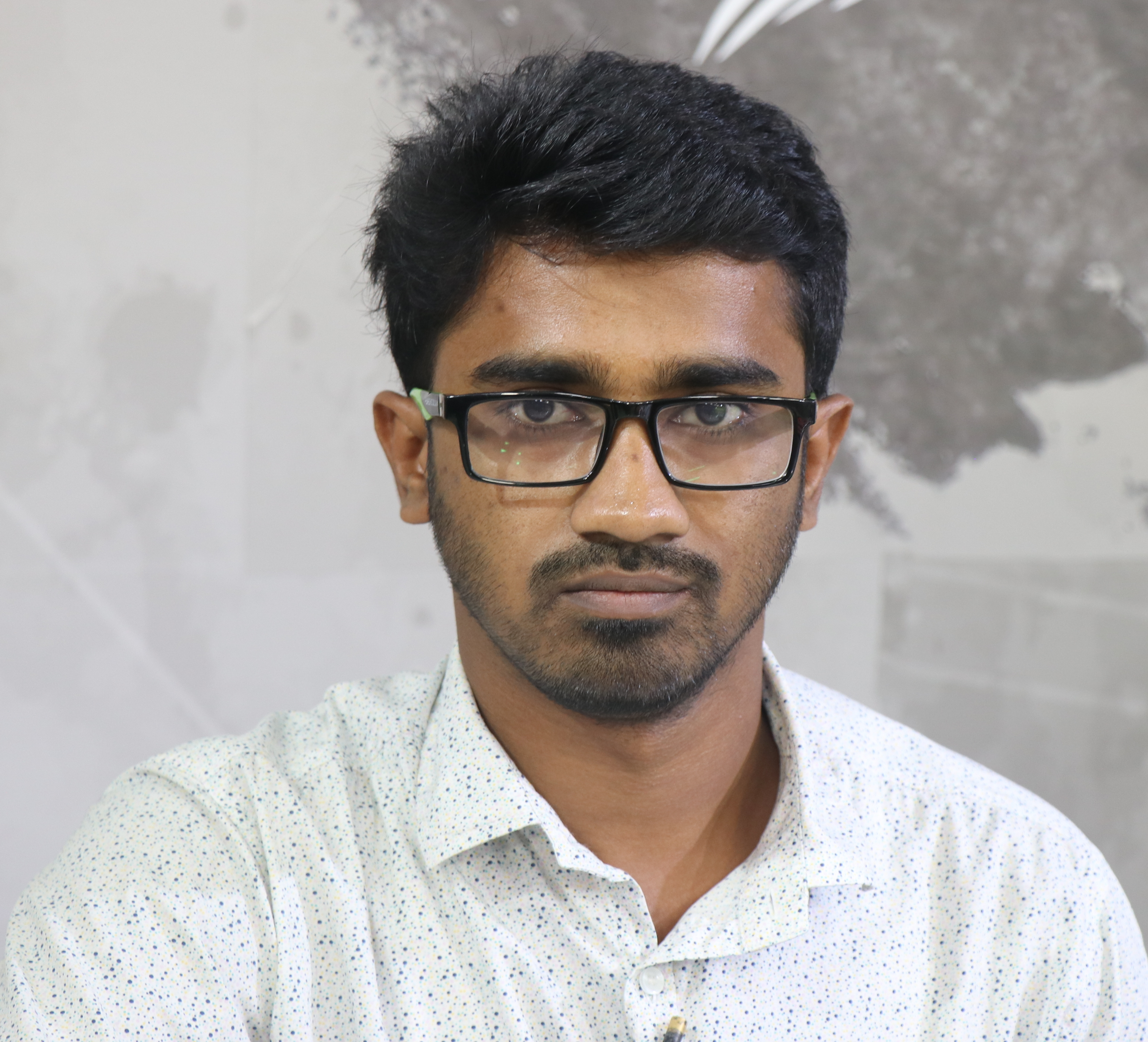
- Rashed khan in Dhaka, 2018

Assistant to the Prime Minister on political affairs
- Incumbent
- Assumed office 20 July 2026
- Prime Minister: Tarique Rahman

General Secretary of Gono Odhikar Parishad
- In office 10 July 2023 – December 2025
- President: Nurul Haque Nur
- Preceded by: Nurul Haque Nur
- Succeeded by: Hasan Al Mamun

Personal details
- Born: 1 December 1994 (age 31) Jhenaidah District, Bangladesh
- Party: Bangladesh Nationalist Party
- Other political affiliations: Gono Odhikar Parishad (2021–2025)
- Education: University of Dhaka
- Occupation: Politician
- Known for: Politician and activist

Rashed Khan (born 1 December 1994) is a Bangladeshi politician and activist who has served as the Assistant to the Prime Minister on political affairs since 20 July 2026. He is a member of the Bangladesh Nationalist Party (BNP). He was previously a leader of Gono Odhikar Parishad. He became known through student politics and later joined national politics.

== Early life and education ==
Khan was born on 1 December 1994 in Jhenaidah District. He completed his Bachelor of Business Administration (BBA) in Banking and Insurance from University of Dhaka. From university he became active in student politics. During his university life, he was involved in different student movements and gained public attention through his political activities.

== Career ==
=== Politicial career ===
Khan first became known as a student leader at University of Dhaka. He took part in several student movements, including the campaign for 2018 Bangladesh quota reform movement. After his student political activities, he became involved with Gono Odhikar Parishad, formed after the 2018 quota reform movement. He served in leadership roles within the party and served as General Secretary of the party. Later, he left Gono Odhikar Parishad due to differences over party leadership and political direction. He subsequently joined Bangladesh Nationalist Party (BNP) and became active in its political programs. He contested 13th Jatiya Sangsad from Jhenaidah-4 constituency as a candidate of Bangladesh Nationalist Party (BNP), using Sheaf of Paddy symbol. He received 55,670 votes and finished third in the election.

=== GS of DUCSU ===
In November 2025, Dhaka University Academic Council cancelled Golam Rabbani’s studentship in its MPhil programme, making his position as general secretary (GS) of Dhaka University Central Students’ Union (DUCSU) invalid. In 2026, the university syndicate formally cancelled his studentship and declared Rashed Khan, who had received second-highest number of votes in 2019 DUCSU election, as GS Rabbani won 2019 election with 10,484 votes, while Rashed received 6,063 votes.

== Appointment ==
On 19 July 2026, Ministry of Public Administration issued a notification appointing Rashed Khan as Assistant to the Prime Minister on political affairs.

According to the notification, he was appointed on a contractual basis and will serve from date of joining until the expiration of Prime Minister's term or until further notice, subject to the satisfaction of the Prime Minister.

The notification also stated that he would hold the status of a secretary.

== See also ==
- Bangladesh Nationalist Party
- Gono Odhikar Parishad
- University of Dhaka
