= Shadik Kayem =

Bangladeshi student activist

- সাদিক কায়েম
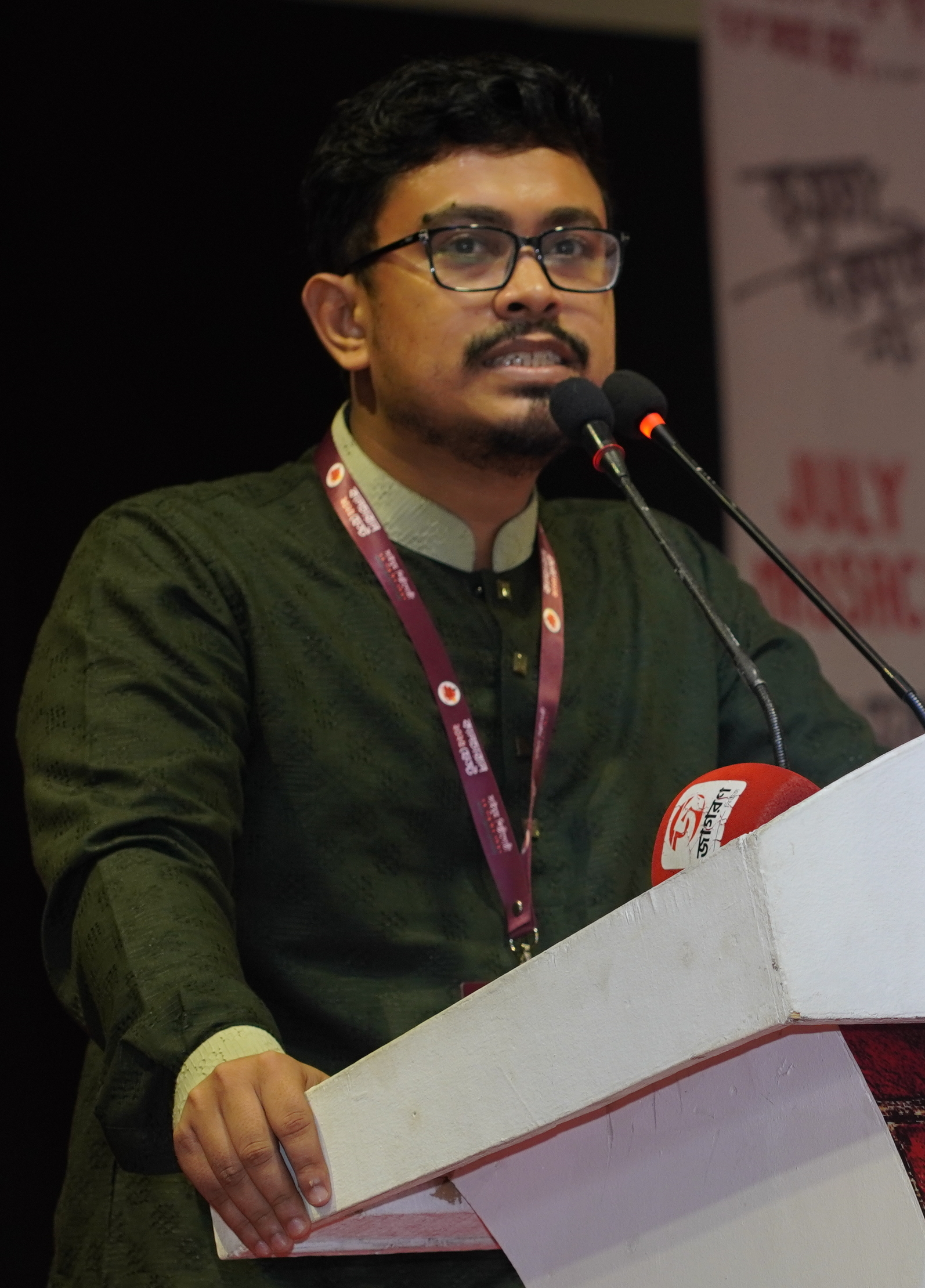
- Shadik at the Suhrawardy Udyan, 2025

27th Vice President of DUCSU
- Incumbent
- Assumed office 14 September 2025
- President: Niaz Ahmed Khan; A B M Obaidul Islam
- General Secretary: S M Farhad
- Preceded by: Nurul Haque Nur

Personal details
- Born: Md. Abu Shadik Satkania, Chittagong, Bangladesh
- Party: Bangladesh Jamaat-e-Islami
- Spouse: Anika Fardin Forayezi (m. 2026)
- Education: University of Dhaka
- Occupation: Political activist
- Organization: Bangladesh Islami Chhatra Shibir (until 2026)
- Movements: July Uprising: 2024 Bangladesh quota reform movement; Non-cooperation movement (2024)

Md. Abu Shadik (Bengali: মোঃ আবু সাদিক), better known as Shadik Kayem (Bengali: সাদিক কায়েম), is a Bangladeshi student activist who has been the vice-president of the Dhaka University Central Students' Union (DUCSU) since 2025.

Previously, he was president of the University of Dhaka unit of Bangladesh Islami Chhatra Shibir during the 2024 academic session and served as the central international affairs secretary of the organization.

== Early life and education ==
Shadik Kayem was born in Satkania Upazila of the Chittagong District. Kayem began his primary education in Khagrachari. He passed his Dakhil examination in 2014 from Baitush Sharaf Jabbariya Adarsha Madrasah. Following that, he passed his Alim examination in 2016 from the Baitush Sharaf Adarsha Kamil Madrasah in Chittagong and was admitted to the Department of Political Science at the University of Dhaka for the 2016–2017 academic session.

Kayem is married to Anika Fardin Farayzi, a medical doctor by profession, who is the daughter of Ayub Ali Farayezi, a businessman who serves as vice chairman of Reliance Group and chairman of Probashibangla Properties Limited.

== Political career ==
=== Student Politics ===
Kayem is a former president of the Chittagong Hill Tracts Students’ Council, former founder of Hill Society and former organizing secretary of the Surya Sen Hall Association of Political Science.

In 2024, following the student–public uprising, Kayem publicly disclosed his position of Bangladesh Islami Chhatra Shibir at Dhaka University. He was also a coordinator of the Students Against Discrimination during 2024 quota reform movement.

He is the former central international affairs secretary of Bangladesh Islami Chhatra Shibir.

=== National Politics ===
On May 1, 2026, Bangladesh Jamaat-e-Islami announced Shadik Kayem as its mayoral candidate for the Dhaka South City Corporation elections during a council session. However, Chhatra Shibir disputed this announcement. In a statement, the GS (General Secretary) of DUCSU and organization's central publicity secretary, SM Farhad, clarified that individuals holding active leadership positions within the student organization are ineligible to represent other political parties as candidates.

On July 13, 2026, when Shadik's student life came to an end, he left from Chhatra Shibir and joined Jamaat-e-Islami. Then, Jamaat has all but finalised VP Shadik Kayem as its candidate for the post of mayor of Dhaka South City Corporation.

=== 2025 DUCSU election ===
Shadik Kayem contested the Dhaka University Central Students' Union (DUCSU) as the vice president (VP) candidate from the Bangladesh Islami Chhatra Shibir backed panel United Students' Alliance. He was elected vice president with 14,042 votes. His closest rival, Abidul Islam Khan of the Bangladesh Jatiotabadi Chatra Dal, received 5,708 votes. He officially assumed office on September 14, 2025.

== Electoral history ==
Year	Election	Position	Party/Alliance	Votes	Percentage	Result
2025	DUCSU Election	Vice President	United Students' Alliance (USA)	14,042	47.99%	Elected

== Activism ==
In addition to his political activities, Shadik has been involved with various non-political organizations.

He served as an advisory member of Students Against Violence Everywhere (SAVE), an organization dedicated to preventing violence against students. He was the general secretary of the Bangladesh Youth Initiative and served as the president of the Chittagong Hill Tracts Students' Council (Parbatya Chattagram Chhatra Sangsad). To improve the quality of life for the hill people, he founded a social and voluntary organization called Hill Society. He also acted as a facilitator for SAVE (Youth - Students Against Violence Everywhere), an organization focused on deterring young people from criminal activities. Additionally, he served as the general secretary of the Surja Sen Hall Association of Political Science.

== Controversy ==
During the DUCSU elections, controversy arose after photos surfaced showing Kayem inside a restricted vote counting room, raising fairness concerns among rivals. Kayem clarified that he entered briefly only to inform officials that returning officers were leaving the polling centres.

On 1 December 2025, Shadik Kayem filed a lawsuit against nine meme-related Facebook pages as well as three Facebook accounts, alleging the dissemination of false information and the cyberbullying of female student leaders. His decision to pursue legal action generated significant debate and criticism on social media, particularly concerning the implications for satire and online expression. Ahsan Habib criticized the case during a discussion titled “Satire, Memes, and Cartoons: Freedom of Expression or Defamation,” organized by the Citizen Coalition in Dhaka. Article 19 condemned the lawsuits, describing them as an “attack on free expression” and urging the Bangladesh government to safeguard the right to online dissent.
