= Baitush Sharaf Adarsha Kamil Madrasah =

Madrasa in Chittagong, Bangladesh

- বায়তুশ শরফ আদর্শ কামিল মাদ্রাসা

Location
- Dhanialapara, Double Mooring Thana Chattogram; Bangladesh
- 22°20′13.1″N 91°48′55.9″E

Information
- Type: Madrasa
- Established: 1982
- Founder: Hadiye Zaman Allama Shah Sufi Abdul Jabbar Rah.
- School district: Chattogram
- Principal: Maulana A.S.M Salimullah
- Grades: 1 to Master's Degree
- Education system: Bangladesh Madrasah Education Board
- Campus: Urban
- Colors: Blue and White
- Affiliation: Islamic University, Bangladesh (2006-2016) Islamic Arabic University (2016- Present)
- Website: baitushsharaf.org

Baitush Sharaf Adarsha Kamil Madrasah (Arabic: مدرسة الكاملة بيت الشرف; Bengali: বায়তুশ শরফ আদর্শ কামিল মাদ্রাসা) is a religious educational institution and alia madrasah in Bangladesh. The madrasah was founded in 1982 by Shah Sufi Abdul Jabbar. The madrasah is located in Dhanialapara area under Double Mooring Thana of Chittagong city. This madrasah secured the first rank in the departmental level in the Dakhil examination held under Madrasa Education Board in 2019.

== History ==
Baitush Sharaf Madrasah initially started with only five classes. Later, by 1994, the madrasah was gradually raised to Kamil level. Lessons are ongoing in science and humanities at Dakhil and Alim levels. Fazil and Kamil joined Islami University, Bangladesh in 2006 for their higher education. Then in the session 2016–17 in 2016 under Islamic Arabic University honors course in two subjects was introduced. The two subjects are Al-Quran and Islamic Studies and Al-Hadith.

== Infrastructure ==
The madrasah consists of two L-shaped five-storied buildings for administrative activities and teaching. There is also a five-storey dormitory building for residential students. Which is known as Hafez Abdur Rahim Hostel.

=== Library management ===
The madrasah has a library on the second floor of the academic building. Also, the madrasah campus has a library of 'Baitush Sharaf Islamic Research Centre'.

=== Residential system ===
The madrasah has hostels. Which is known as Hafez Abdur Rahim Hostel. About 350 students are staying in it.

== Notable alumni ==
- Shadik Kayem
