= Gono Odhikar Parishad =

Political party in Bangladesh

Gono Odhikar Parishad গণ অধিকার পরিষদ
- Abbreviation: GOP
- President: Nurul Haque Nur
- General Secretary: Hasan Al Mamun
- Governing body: Central Executive Council
- Standing Committee: Higher Council
- Founder: Nurul Haque Nur
- Founded: 26 October 2021; 4 years ago
- Registered: 2 September 2024; 23 months ago
- Headquarters: Al-Razi Complex, Purana Paltan, Dhaka
- Student wing: Bangladesh Chhatra Odhikar Parishad
- Youth wing: Bangladesh Jubo Odhikar Parishad
- Political position: Centre
- Slogan: জনতার অধিকার, আমাদের অঙ্গিকার ("People's Rights, Our Commitment")
- Bangladesh Parliament: 1 / 350

Election symbol
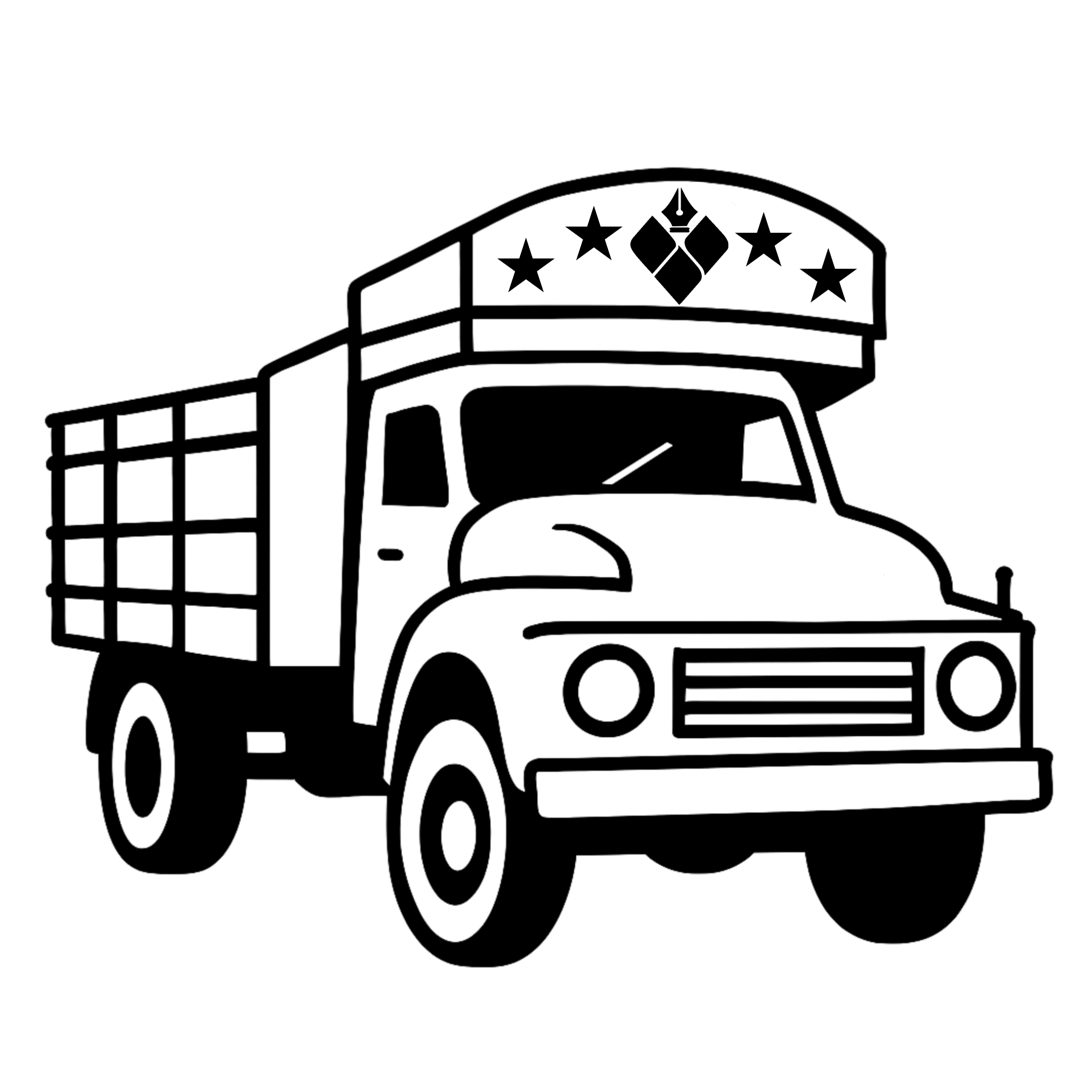
- Truck

Party flag

Gono Odhikar Parishad (Bengali: গণ অধিকার পরিষদ, lit. 'People's Rights Council', abbreviated as GOP), is a political party in Bangladesh, led by former DUCSU vice-president Nurul Haque Nur.

== History ==
Nurul Haq Nur, head of the Gono Odhikar Parishad (GOP), addressing party members upon receiving registration as a political party in 2024

The Bangladesh Chhatra Odhikar Parishad was established on 17 February 2018. On 17 February 2020, the organization was renamed Chhatra Odhikar Parishad.

The DUCSU election took place on 25 February 2019. (Note: References:) Leaders of the quota reform movement participated in the election, considering their influence and acceptance as a panel. Despite allegations of irregularities and rigging in the election, two leaders of the quota reform movement won the positions of Vice President and Social Services Secretary. This success contributed to the emergence of a potential new political trend within the broader student rights movement.

On Tuesday, 26 October 2021, the Gono Odhikar Parishad was officially launched as a political party. The party was founded under the leadership of economist Dr. Reza Kibria and former DUCSU Vice President Nurul Haq Nur, with four core principles: democracy, justice, rights, and national interest. The party's headquarters is located at the Al Razi Complex in Bijoynagar, Purana Paltan, Dhaka. (Note: Multiple citations:)

== Contemporary politics ==
In June 2023, Reza Kibria, the convenor of the party, and Nurul Haq, the member secretary, dismissed each other from their positions. Later, on 10 July, Nurul Haq's supporters held a national council, electing Nurul Haq as the President and Md Rashed Khan as the General Secretary. However, another faction formed a convening committee with Reza Kibria as the convenor and Faruk Hasan as the acting member secretary. On 26 September, Reza Kibria's faction applied to the Election Commission for registration as a political party, but the application was rejected. On 31 December 2023, Reza Kibria left the Gono Odhikar Parishad.

The party applied for registration to participate in the Twelfth National Parliamentary Election, but failed to obtain it. On 13 December 2023, the party held a protest and road blockade demanding the cancellation of the election schedule, resignation of the government, and elections under a neutral government. On 19 December, the police obstructed the party's program.

In June 2024, efforts were made to reunite the two factions of the party. On 14 August, the party demanded the banning of the Awami League, Chhatra League, and Jubo League and designating them as terrorist organizations. On 31 August, grassroots members of the party's two factions issued an ultimatum to unite. On 2 September, the Bangladesh Election Commission granted the party its registration.

== Election results ==
=== Jatiya Sangsad elections ===
Election year	Party leader	Votes	% of Percentage	Seats	+/–	Position	Outcome	Ref.
2026	Nurul Haque Nur	TBD	0.33%	1 / 300	▲1	▲TBD	Coalition government	

== See also ==
- Politics of Bangladesh
- List of political parties in Bangladesh
