= Revolutionary Student Unity =

Marxist-Leninist student-mass organization in Bangladesh

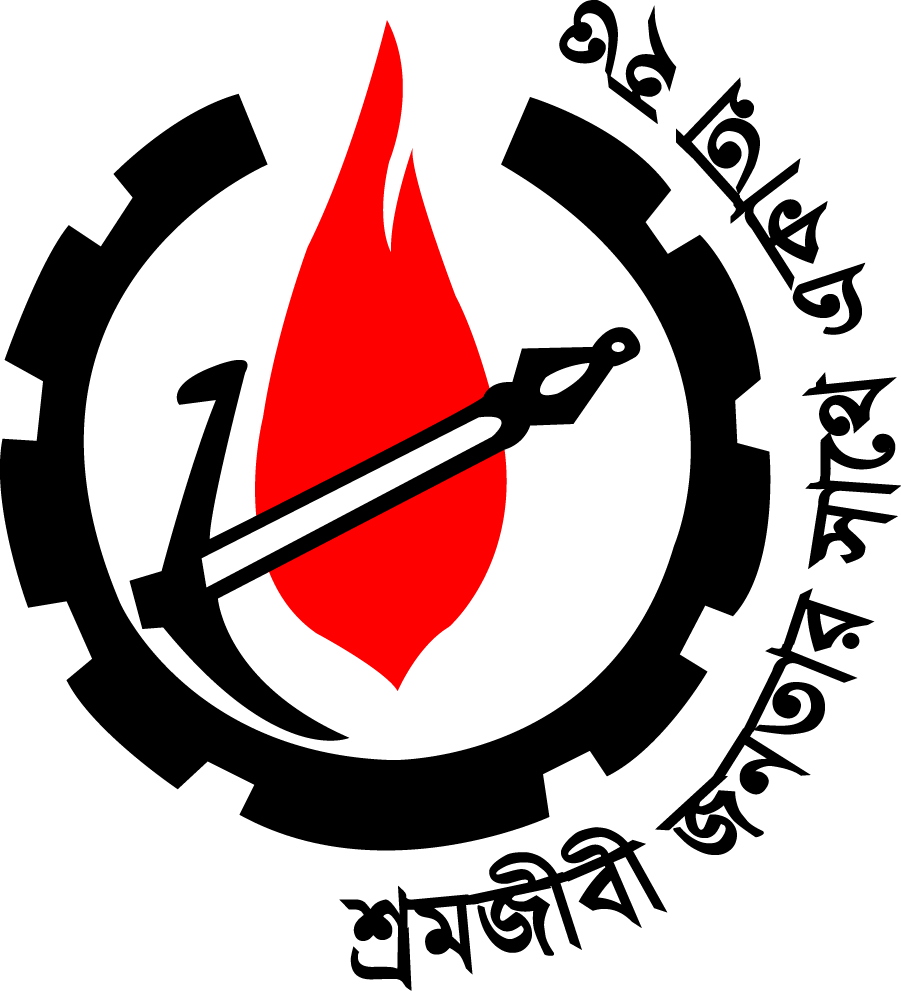
- Motto: শ্রমজীবি জনতার সাথে একাত্ম হও! ("Unite with the working masses!")
- Location: 42/1, 4th Floor, Segunbagicha, Dhaka, Bangladesh
- Established: 6 December 1980; 45 years ago
- President: Shahriar Khandaker Alif
- General secretary: Toyob Islam
- Sabbatical officers: Democratic Students Alliance
- Colours: Red Yellow
- Ideology: Communism; Marxism–Leninism; Mao Zedong Thought; Anti-imperialism

Revolutionary Student Unity

Party flag

Revolutionary Student Unity (RSU) (Bengali: বিপ্লবী ছাত্র মৈত্রী), is a progressive left-wing students' organization in Bangladesh. Ideologically Marxist–Leninist. It was founded through the unification of National Students Movement (Bengali: জাতীয় ছাত্র আন্দোলন), East Bengal Students Union (Bengali: পূর্ব বাংলা ছাত্র ইউনিয়ন) and two centers of National Students Group (Bengali: জাতীয় ছাত্রদল) in the historic Bottola premises at the University of Dhaka.

The highest body within RSU is the Central Council, which convenes every two years. Since the 16th National Council of Revolutionary Student Unity, which was held on 30-31 May 2024, Dilip Ray has been serving as President, Jabir Ahmed Jubel as General Secretary, Shakil Hossain as Organizing Secretary and Shahriar Khandakar Alif as Deputy General Secretary. The current central committee consists of 17 members.

Raising the banner of unity against the breakdown of parties and organizations in the left-wing politics of Bangladesh has been one of the goals of Revolutionary Student Unity since its inception. The organization has set its goal to establish a one-way science based democratic education system in Bangladesh. It had a significant role during most of the recent progressive movements, notably in the 1990 mass uprising against the military rule of Hussein Muhammad Ershad and the anti-Razakar 2013 Shahbag protests.
