= Bangladesh Chhatra Maitri =

Student organisation in Bangladesh

Bangladesh Chhatra Maitree বাংলাদেশ ছাত্র মৈত্রী
- President: Atulon Das Alo
- General Secretary: Aditi Adrita Srishti
- Founded: 6 December 1980 (45 years ago)
- Preceded by: East Pakistan Students Union
- Headquarters: 21/1 Topkhana Road, Bangladesh Shishu Kallyan Parishad (Ground Floor), Dhaka-1000
- Ideology: Socialism; Communism
- Mother party: Workers Party of Bangladesh
- Newspaper: Chhatra Maitree
- Website: studentsunitybd.com

Flag

Bangladesh Chhatra Maitri (Bengali: বাংলাদেশ ছাত্র মৈত্রী, lit. 'Bangladesh Student Alliance') is the student wing of the Workers Party of Bangladesh (WPB).

== History ==
The East Pakistan Students Union was established on April 26, 1952, and in the 1960s, it split into two factions: the pro-Peking group led by Menon and the pro-Moscow group led by Matia.

On December 6, 1980, four factions of Menon's group, including the National Student Movement, two factions of National Chhatra Dal, and Bangla Chhatra Union, came together to form Biplobi Chhatra Maitri. Later, in September 1987, Biplobi Chhatra Maitri merged with Biplobi Chhatra Union and was renamed Bangladesh Chhatra Maitri.

In 1995, a faction of expelled members from Chhatra Maitri formed a new group, also called Biplobi Chhatra Maitri.

By February 2019, Chhatra Maitri announced its full panel for the Dhaka University Central Students' Union (DUCSU) elections.

In 2022, Chhatra Maitri formed a new central committee.

in January 2024, the former president of Bangladesh Chhatra Maitri, Bappaditya Basu, was arrested by the Rapid Action Battalion (RAB) in Dhaka on charges of embezzlement and fraud.
