= Socialist Students' Front =

Progressive revolutionary students' organization in Bangladesh

Socialist Students' Front সমাজতান্ত্রিক ছাত্রফ্রন্ট
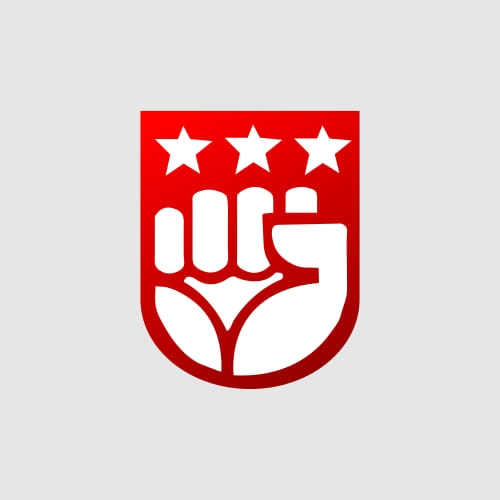
- SSF Emblem
- President: Mukta Barai
- Secretary General: Raihan Uddin
- Founded: 21 January 1984
- Headquarters: 23/2, Topkhana Road, Dhaka -1000, Bangladesh
- Ideology: Communism; Marxism–Leninism
- Mother party: Socialist Party of Bangladesh
- International affiliation: WFDY
- Website: spb.org.bd

Flag
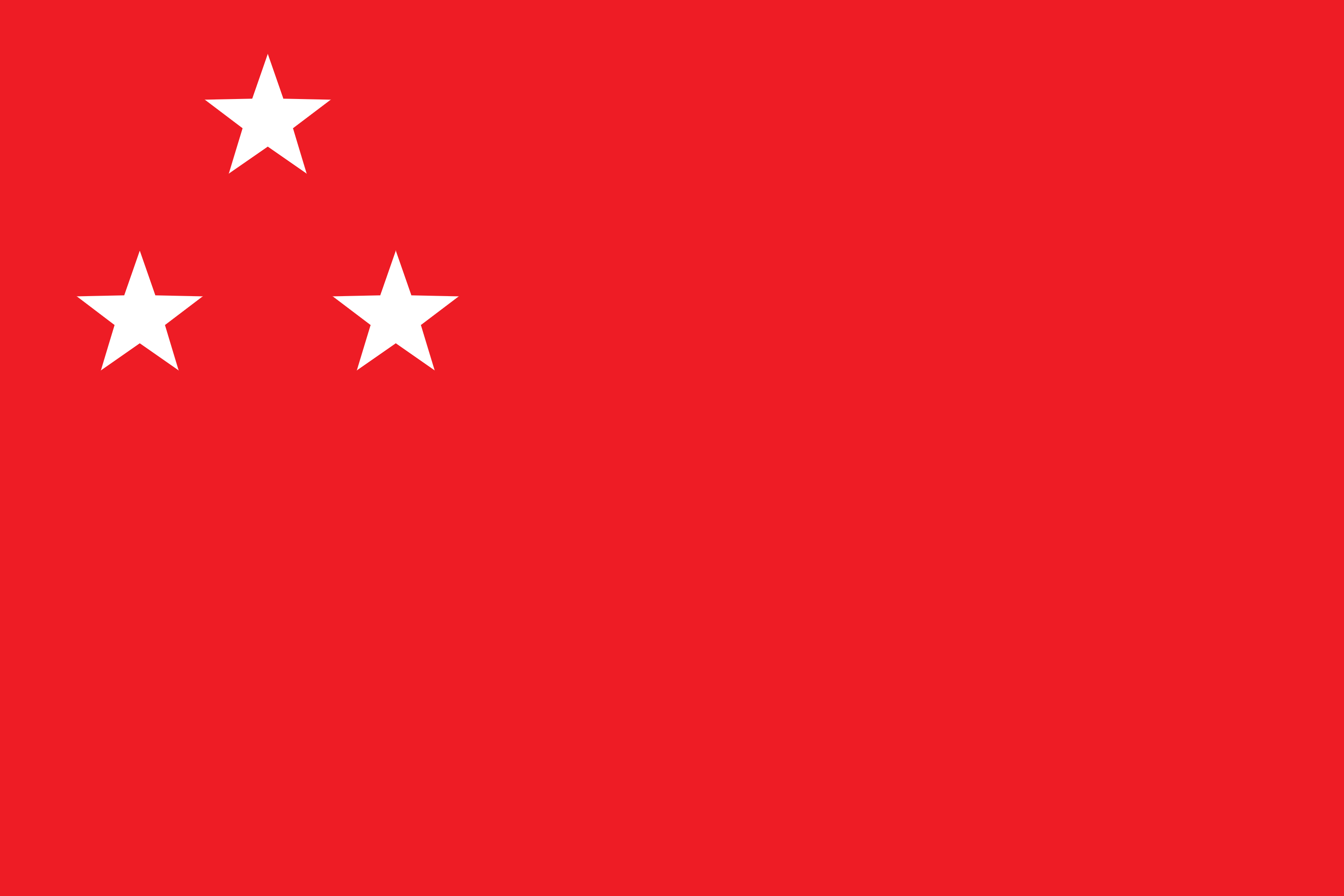

The Socialist Students' Front (SSF) (Bengali: সমাজতান্ত্রিক ছাত্রফ্রন্ট) is a Marxist–Leninist student organization in Bangladesh. It is one of the largest leftist students' organization in the country. SSF maintains a good relationship with the All India Students Association.

The slogans of the SSF are: "Socialist Students' Front, commitments to the revolution!", "Socialist Students' Front, commitments to save the rights of education!".

== History ==
The SSF was founded on 21 January 1984 during the movement against the military dictatorship. It played a major role in overthrowing the dictator Hussain Muhammad Ershad and bringing about democratic rule in 1990. The main objective of the SSF is to build a students' movement throughout the country; to bring about educational reform; to make education accessible, universal, scientific, secular, equal, and democratic; and to create an education system that is conducive to the growth and development of a revolutionary movement for the overthrow of capitalism and establishment of socialist state. SSF is a member of several international students' organizations including the World Federation of Democratic Youth.

SSF's motto is "Unity, Struggle, Progress". SSF's flag contains three white five cornered stars in the top left corner, on a red background. The ratio of length to width of the flag is 3:2. SSF's monogram is a raised fist with three stars.

SSF publishes an official organ, Ovimot (Bengali: অভিমত; English: The Intention/Opinion). It is published in Bengali by the Central Committee.

== Central Committee ==
The organization elected its most recent central committee through the 19th Central Council that took place at DUCSU in the University of Dhaka. The latest central committee members of the organization are:

- President: Mukta Barai
- Vice-president: Susmita Moriom
- General Secretary: Raihan Uddin
- Organising Secretary: Suhail Ahmed Shuvo
- Office Secretary: Anik Kumar Das
- Finance Secretary: Sultana Akhter
- Promotion and Publication Secretary: Harun-or-Rashid
- School Affairs Secretary: Biswajit Nandi
- International Affairs Secretary: Rina Murmu
- Members:
  - Jugesh Tripura
  - Dhanonjoy Barman
  - Laboni Sultana
  - Anowarul Islam
  - Rizu Laxmi Aborodh
  - Bijon Sikdar
  - Miraj Uddin
  - Rhythm Shahriar
  - Khaleda Akter

== Mass organizations of SSF ==
SSF has children, teenager, science, and cultural wings to work with different classes of people. Some of the organizations include:

- Shishu Kishor Mela (SKMela)
- Biggan Andolan Moncho (BAM) - Platform of Science Movement (PSM)
- Charan Cultural Center (CCC)

== Notable movements ==
SSF was founded during the movement against the military rule of Hussain Muhammad Ershad and played an important role in building the students' movement against the military rule. Since then, it has led numerous movements in the history of students' politics in Bangladesh.

- Mass movement against privatization of education in 1986.
- Movement against the educational policy proposed by the Majid Khan Commission on 14 February 1983.
- A strong movement against the fee hike and bus fare hike in 1987. Its first conference was also held in 28 January of the same year. In the same year, it also formed and led an alliance of 22 students organization to strengthen the ongoing movement against Hussain Muhammad Ershad.
- It formed the historic All Party Students' Alliance in 1990 which essentially helped to bring down the autocratic regime and bring about democracy in Bangladesh.
- Organized an anti-rapist movement at Jahangirnagar University in 1998 that resulted in the High Court order forming the Anti-Sexual Harassment Cell for organizations and institutions in Bangladesh.
- 6 days long education conference consisting of 10 sessions by 129 renowned speakers in 16–21 September 1999.
- Occupy UGC movement in 2006 to reject the 20 years strategic plan.
- Organizing Gonojagaran Mancha, a movement for the punishment of war criminals in 2013.
- Movement demanding justice for Shohagi Jahan Tonu, a student of Comilla Victoria Government College who was raped inside Comilla Cantonment in 2017.
- Organizing its 5th Central Conference and a movement to raise budget allocation in education on 25 September 2019.
- Anti-Rape long march to Noakhali District protesting the rape and violence against women in 2020.
- Movement against Digital Security Act and protesting the death of the writer Mushtaq Ahmed in police custody, who was arrested under the act in 2021.

== See also ==
- List of student organizations in Bangladesh
