= Anti-Terrorism Act, 2009 =

Counter-terrorism legislation in Bangladesh

Jatiya Sangsad
- Long title: Whereas it is expedient and necessary to make provisions for the prevention of certain terrorist activities effective punishment there of and the matters ancillary there to
- Citation: Act No. 16 of 2009
- Territorial extent: Bangladesh
- Enacted by: Jatiya Sangsad
- Enacted: 24 February 2009
- Assented to: 24 February 2009
- Commenced: 11 June 2008
- Status: Amended

The Anti-Terrorism Act, 2009 (Bengali: সন্ত্রাস বিরোধী আইন, ২০০৯) is an Act passed by the Jatiya Sangsad in 2009 to grant the Government of Bangladesh additional powers to prevent and combat terrorism in Bangladesh. The Act was passed by the Awami League-led Grand Alliance led by Prime Minister Sheikh Hasina following their victory in the 2008 general election. The statute has contributed to Bangladesh being ranked most successful in combatting terrorism in South Asia by the Global Terrorism Index.

== History ==
The Law was formulated by the Grand Alliance government led by Bangladesh Awami League in 2009. The law was given retrospective effect from 11 June 2008. The law was designed to target terrorists and financial institutions used by them. The law introduced a stipulation that the Bangladesh Police must conclude an active terrorist investigation within 60 days.

The law was subsequently amended in 2012 and 2013. In 2012, it was amended to allow for capital punishment for certain offences under the Act. In 2013, it was amended to make admissible the use of online communications such as social media as evidence in court.

== Criticism ==
Human rights group, Odhikar, has called for the law to be repealed describing the act as a tool for repression to those opposed to the government. Cases under this act need government approval for trials to begin, which are sometimes delayed, thus effectively placing the cases in legal limbo.
