= Islami Chhatra Andolan Bangladesh =

Student organization in Bangladesh

Islami Chhatra Andolan Bangladesh ইসলামী ছাত্র আন্দোলন বাংলাদেশ
- President: Muntasir Ahmad
- Vice President: Khairul Ahsan Marjan, Hossain Ibne Sarwar and Imran Hossain Noor
- Secretary General: Sultan Mahmud
- Founded: August 23, 1991; 34 years ago
- Headquarters: 55/B (3rd Floor), Purana Paltan, Dhaka
- Ideology: Islamism; Conservatism
- Position: Right-wing
- Colours: Green
- National affiliation: Islami Andolan Bangladesh
- Website: chhatraandolan.org

Flag

Islami Chhatra Andolan Bangladesh (Bengali: ইসলামী ছাত্র আন্দোলন বাংলাদেশ, lit. 'Islamic Student Movement Bangladesh') (ICAB) is the student wing of Islami Andolan Bangladesh (IAB), It was officially established in 1991.

== History ==
On 23 August 1991, the organization was established to provide support young Muslim students and devout Muslim youth. Back then, the organization was called 'Islami Shashantantra Chhatra Andolan', Later on, the organization, name, committees and leaderships were changed significantly.

== Leadership ==
The central president of the organization is Muntasir Ahmad. Central Vice President is Khairul Ahsan Marjan, Hossain Ibne Sorwar and Imran Hossain Noor. Secretary general is Sultan Mahmud.

== Activities ==
Every year, Islami Chhatra Andolan Bangladesh's new members rally and the historic student mass gathering are held at the historic annual mahfil of Charmonai organized by the Bangladesh Mujahid Committee.

=== Social activities ===
Islami Chhatra Andolan Bangladesh organizes blood group campaigns on various campuses, social and religious events. Admission support desks are run under the supervision of Islami Chhatra Andolan Bangladesh in various university admission examinations. Every year, Islami Chhatra Andolan Bangladesh organizes tree plantation programs in different places of the country. In March 2025, Islami Chhatra Andolan Bangladesh organized a protest march against rape, demanding justice for all rape cases nationwide and maximum punishment for rapists.

=== 2002 Mosque Movement ===
The then ruling party leaders forcibly demolished the T&T Baitul Azim Jame Mosque in Dhaka's Malibagh in 2002 to build a market. Islami Chhatra Andolan Bangladesh took to the streets to protest. Isha activists Shaheed Hafez Abul Bashar, Shaheed Rezaul Karim Dhali, Shaheed Yahya and Shaheed Joynal Abedin were martyred in the protest. In addition, 60 people were injured in police-Ansar firing. The movement was led by Islami Andolan Bangladesh and its student organization.
