= Bangladesh Chhatra Odhikar Parishad =

Bangladeshi student organisation

Bangladesh Chhatra Odhikar Parishad বাংলাদেশ ছাত্র অধিকার পরিষদ
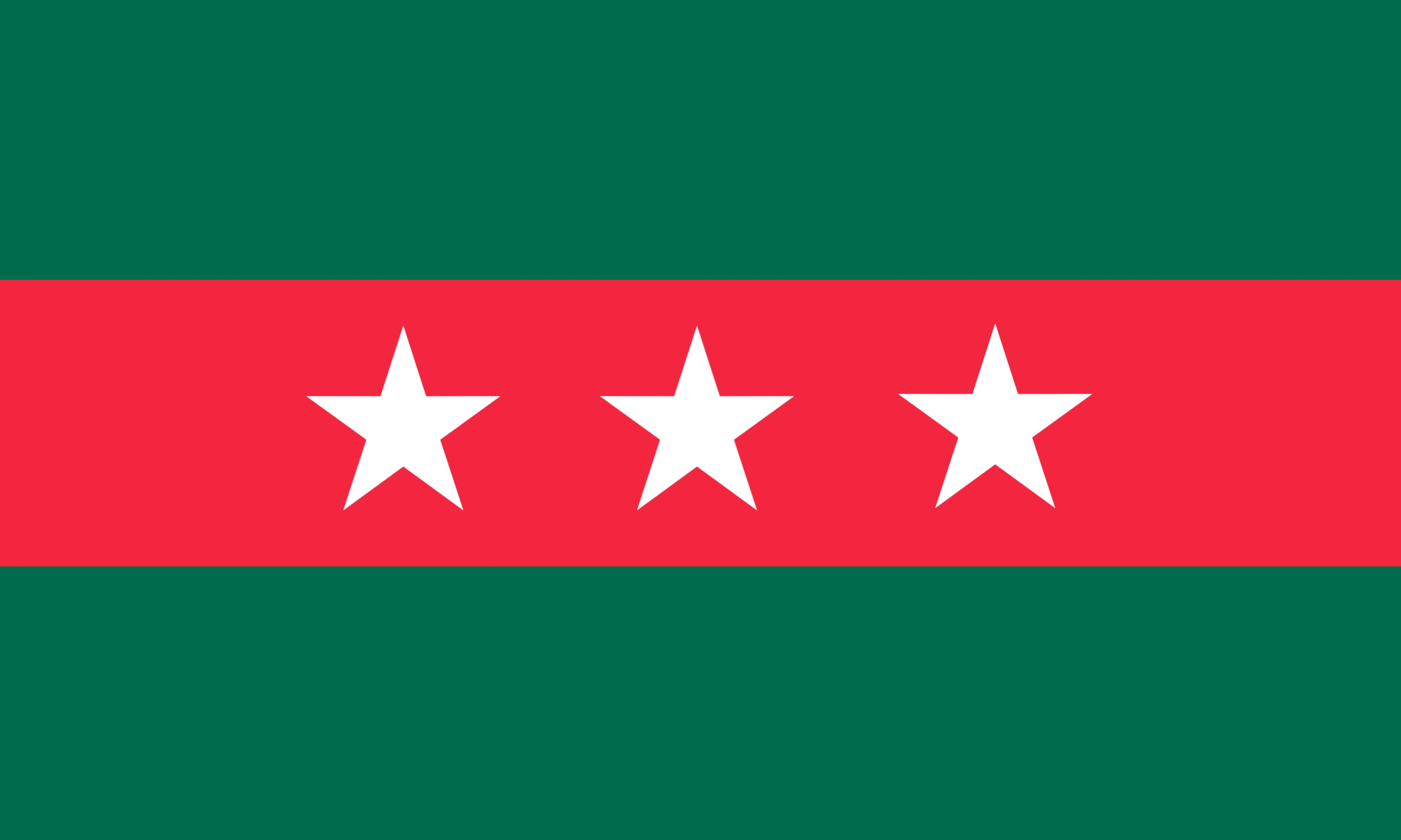
- Flag
- President: Nazmul Hasan
- Secretary General: Sanaullah Hoque
- Founded: 17 February 2018; 8 years ago
- Preceded by: Bangladesh Sadharon Chhatra Odhikar Songrokkhon Parishad
- Headquarters: University of Dhaka
- Ideology: Equality; Human Dignity; Social Justice
- Position: Centre
- Colours
- Mother party: Gono Odhikar Parishad

Bangladesh Chhatra Odhikar Parishad (Bengali: বাংলাদেশ ছাত্র অধিকার পরিষদ, lit. 'Bangladesh Students' Rights Council'), abbreviated as BSRC, is a Bangladeshi student organisation. Founded by Nurul Haque Nur and Hasan Al Mamun, it is the student wing of Gono Odhikar Parishad.

== First Council ==
The first council of the Bangladesh Chhatra Odhikar Parishad was held on 28 August 2021. Bin Yamin Molla was elected as the president and Ariful Islam Adeeb as the general secretary. Molla Rahmatullah became the organizing secretary.

== Second Council ==
The second council of the Bangladesh Chhatra Odhikar Parishad was held on 13 September 2024. Bin Yamin Molla was elected as the president and Nazmul Hasan as the general secretary.

== Third Council ==
The third council of the Bangladesh Chhatra Odhikar Parishad was occurred on 2 December 2025. Nazmul Hasan was elected as the president and Sanaullah Haque as the general secretary.

== History ==
The Bangladesh Sadharon Chhatra Odhikar Songrokkhon Parishad was established in 2018. Its main agenda was to promote and protect general students' rights, to reform quotas and eliminate all types of discriminations in the recruitment of government employees.

The organisation first came to prominence in 2018 for leading 2018 Bangladesh quota reform movement. Due to the movement's increasing popularity, Bangladesh government accepted its five-point demands and abolished quotas in the recruitment of Bangladesh Civil Service cadres though no reform was announced in the recruitment of lower grade officers.

In July 2018, many involved in the demonstrations of the organization were brutally attacked. In July 2018, the embassies of Germany, USA, Norway, Switzerland and few other countries in Dhaka expressed their concern over the "brutal attacks" on peaceful demonstration of Bangladesh Sadharon Chhatra Odhikar Songrokkhon Parishad. For 2019, DUCSU election, the organisation announced its panel on 25 February 2019. The organisation made Nurul Haq Nur vice-president candidate of the panel and Muhammad Rashed Khan general secretary contender and Faruk Hasan assistant general secretary nominee.

In 2019, it transformed into a full-fledged student organization called Bangladesh Chhatra Odhikar Parishad, which aimed to establish students' rights and play a role in various democratic movements.
