= Nurul Haque Nur =

Bangladeshi student activist (born 1991)

- নুরুল হক নুর
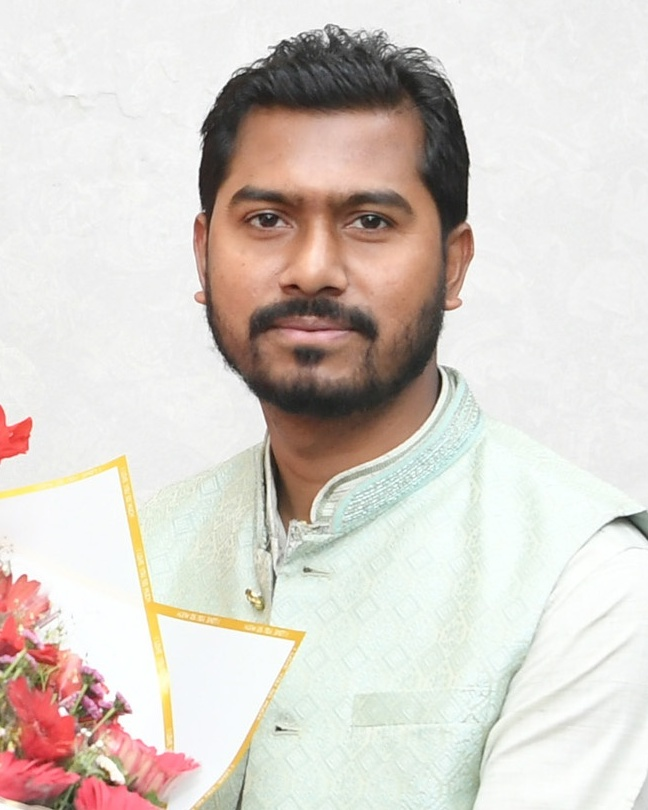
- Nur in 2026

Minister of State for Expatriates Welfare and Overseas Employment
- Incumbent
- Assumed office 17 February 2026
- Prime Minister: Tarique Rahman
- Preceded by: Asif Nazrul

Member of Parliament
- Incumbent
- Assumed office 17 February 2026
- Preceded by: SM Shahjada
- Constituency: Patuakhali-3

Minister of State for Labour and Employment
- In office 17 February 2026 – 4 March 2026
- Prime Minister: Tarique Rahman
- Preceded by: Monnujan Sufian

President of Gono Odhikar Parishad
- Incumbent
- Assumed office 10 July 2023
- General Secretary: Hasan Al Mamun
- Preceded by: Reza Kibria

26th Vice President of DUCSU
- In office 12 March 2019 – 22 June 2020
- President: Mohammed Akhtaruzzaman
- Preceded by: Amanullah Aman
- Succeeded by: Shadik Kayem

Personal details
- Born: Md. Nurul Haque; 30 January 1994 (age 32) Patuakhali, Barishal, Bangladesh
- Party: Gono Odhikar Parishad
- Education: University of Dhaka
- Known for: Quota Reform Movement

Nurul Haque Nur (born 30 January 1994), popularly known as VP Nur, is a Bangladeshi political activist and currently serving as the President of the Gono Odhikar Parishad. At present, he is the Minister of State for Expatriates Welfare and Overseas Employment in the Tarique ministry. He also served as the Minister of State for Labour and Employment from 17 February 2026 to 4 March 2026. He came to prominence in 2018 as a joint-convener of Bangladesh Chhatra Odhikar Parishad, which led the 2018 Bangladesh quota reform movement. In 2019, he was elected as the vice president of Dhaka University Central Students' Union (DUCSU). He is also the convener of the Chhatra, Jubo and Probashi Odhikar Parishad.

== Early life ==
Nurul Haque Nur attended the SSC examination from Gol Abdur Rahim Secondary School, Companir hat 2010 and participated in the HSC examination from Uttara High School and College, Dhaka in 2012.

== Activism ==
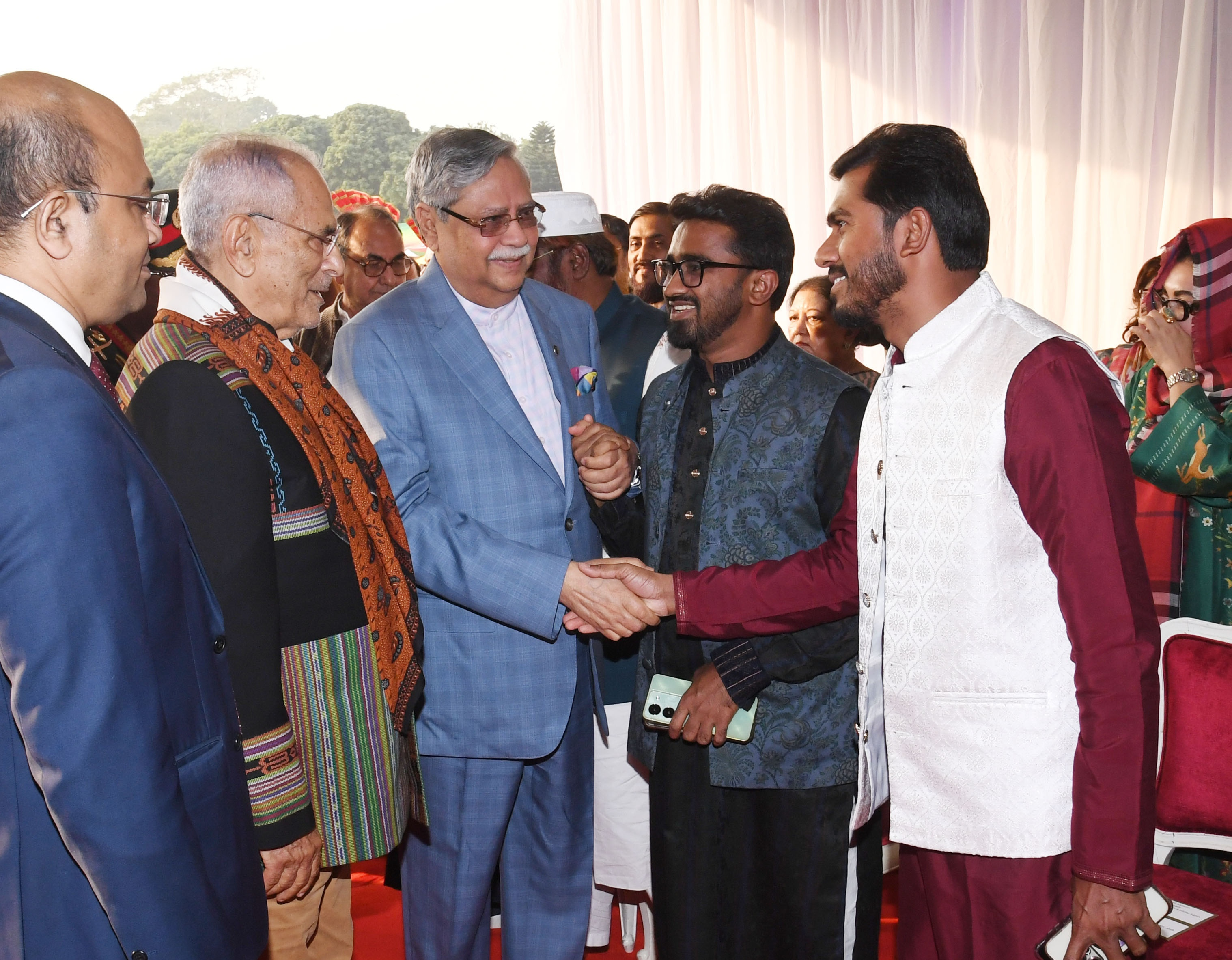
Nur greeting President Mohammed Shahabuddin on the Victory Day of Bangladesh in 2024.

In 2018, Nur became a joint-convenor of Bangladesh Chhatra Odhikar Parishad, which led the 2018 Bangladesh quota reform movement. On 30 June 2018, he was beaten in front of the Dhaka University Central Library. Members of Bangladesh Chhatra League were involved in this incident. None of attackers were held responsible for their actions.

In 2019, Nur was elected as the vice president of DUCSU. He frequently led protests against various issues in Bangladesh, among them protests for demanding the fair price of paddy for farmers, demanding the repeal of affiliation of seven college from University of Dhaka, demanding justice for Nusrat, and justice for Abrar.

Apart from national issues, Nur also raised voices for international issues. In particular, he protested the controversial acts CAA and NRC passed by Indian parliament. On 22 December 2018, he gave a rally at the pedestal of the Raju sculpture of Dhaka University in the solidarity of the students protesting against the citizenship amendment law of India and national citizenship registration. At that rally, the leaders of the Muktujuddah Manch (freedom fight stage) a clash when they tried to stop. Many of his fellow activists were beaten to hospital. In protest of this attack, Nur and his organization decided to block a higher study seminar that was organized in support from the Indian Embassy of Bangladesh. However, the attack on Nur and his fellow members continues. The most heinous attack happened on 23 December. On that day, Nur and his fellow activists were attacked by the members of Muktujuddah Manch at the DUCSU. Two of his fellow activists were thrown from the roof by the attackers. Many of the activists were taken to ICU; Tuhin Farabi was taken to life support. Nur and his brother were also injured severely. On 24 December 2019, police filed a case against Shahbag police station and arrested the then general secretary of the Muktijuddah Manch Yasin Arafat Turi and the office secretary Mehedi Hasan Shanto on charges of involvement in the attack. In the same year, 2019, Nur was attacked seven times in different movements.

During the 2024 Bangladesh quota reform movement Nur was arrested by police on 20 July on charges of involvement in the 18 July arson attack on Setu Bhaban despite being completely uninvolved in the movement. The arrest was widely viewed as politically motivated. Despite the lack of any concrete evidence, the court denied him bail and ordered him sent to jail after a 5-day remand. According to his wife, who spoke to the media, Nur was in good health prior to his arrest. Upon release from remand on 26 July, however, it was apparent that Nur had been severely tortured and beaten, as he appeared in significant pain and unable to stand without assistance.

Bangladeshi law mandates that an arrested person must be presented in court within 24 hours. If this does not happen, it is deemed an enforced disappearance. In Nur's situation, he was unaccounted for 40 hours before being brought to court, according to his wife, which raises questions about the legality of his detention. His wife also said that law enforcers torture Nur in remand.

Nurul Haq Nur, head of the Gono Odhikar Parishad (GOP), addressing party members upon receiving registration as a political party in 2024

In August 2025, Nur, was severely beaten during a clash in the Kakrail area of Dhaka. The attack occurred on August 29, 2025, during a demonstration his party was holding near the central office of the Jatiya Party.

Nur sustained serious injuries, including a head injury and a fractured nose, and was admitted to Dhaka Medical College Hospital, initially in the ICU, before being transferred to a private hospital and eventually traveling to Singapore for advanced medical care. The government formed a commission to investigate the matter.

- Gono Odhikar Parishad leaders, including General Secretary Rashed Khan, alleged that Jatiya Party activists initiated the attack, and were later joined by police and army personnel who "carried out the second phase of the attack".
- The Jatiya Party claimed that Gono Odhikar Parishad members attacked their office first.
- The Inter-Services Public Relations Directorate (ISPR) stated that law enforcement was compelled to use force to protect public security as a "mob" tried to create unrest and launched "organised attacks" on law enforcers.
- The government pledged a judicial inquiry into the incident, headed by a High Court Justice, to identify those responsible. While the July uprising was characterized by leaderless, spontaneous public participation, VP Nur played a significant role as an experienced opposition figure and organizer, particularly by offering strategic support to the student movement and later becoming a vocal advocate for the revolution's political demands.

== Controversy ==
Palestinian Ambassador to Bangladesh, Yousef SY Ramadan, stated that Nurul Haque Nur held three meetings with Israel's intelligence agency, Mossad. Speaking at the Palestinian Embassy in Dhaka, the ambassador described these meetings as a "threat to the security of Bangladesh." He stated that Palestinian intelligence obtained photos of Nur meeting Israelis in Qatar, Dubai, and India, with the initial discovery made during the 2022 FIFA World Cup in Qatar. Ramadan urged the Bangladesh government to investigate the matter, questioning whether Nur's denial of the meetings would suffice for the country's security forces. Bangladesh has no diplomatic relations with Israel and has consistently supported the sovereignty of Palestine.
