= Dhaka University Central Students' Union =

Official student union of the University of Dhaka

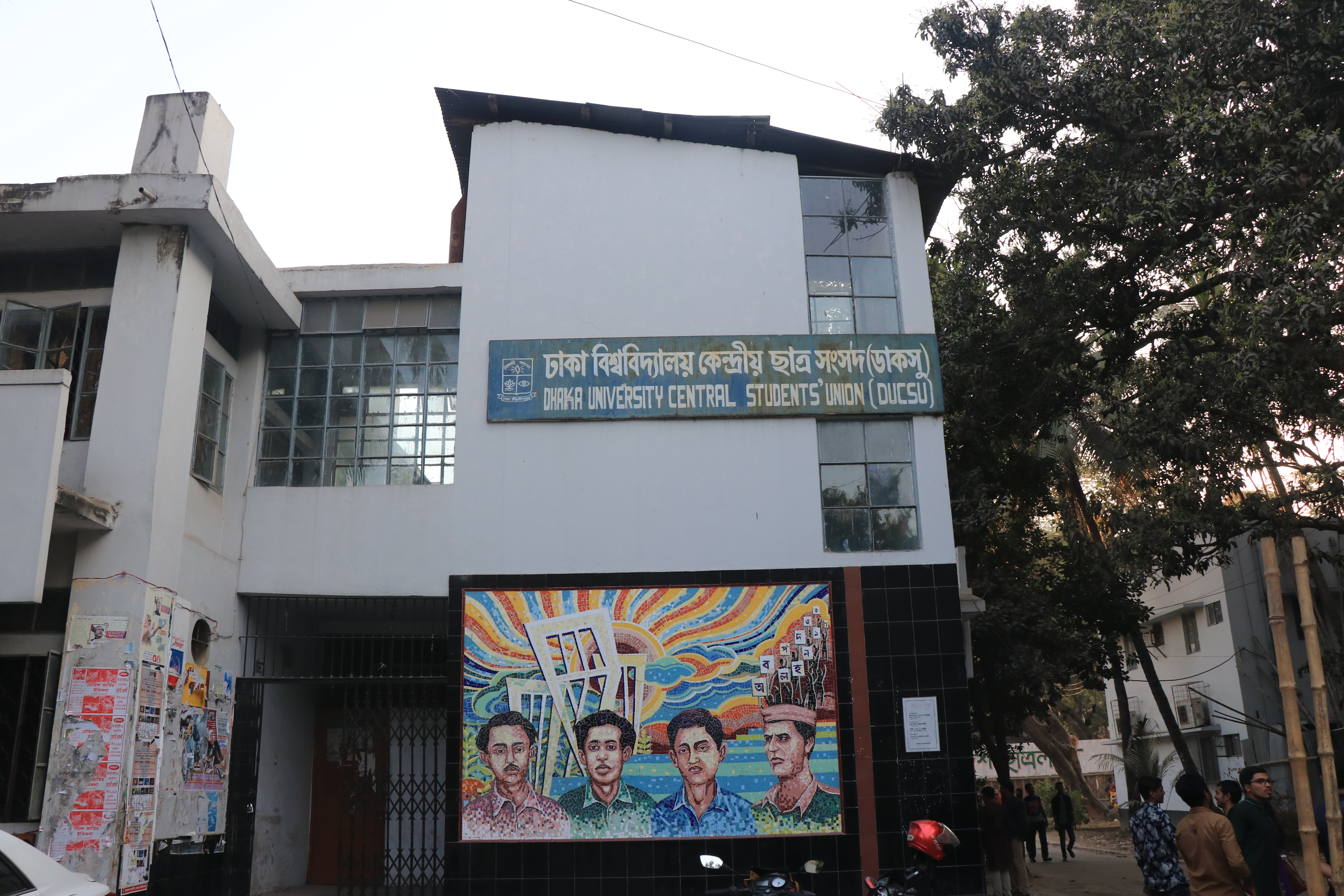
- Institution: University of Dhaka
- Location: Dhaka
- Established: 1923 (as DUSU); 1953 (as DUCSU)
- President: A B M Obaidul Islam
- Vice president: Shadik Kayem
- General secretary: SM Farhad
- Members: 39,775 (as of September 2025)
- Website: ducsu.du.ac.bd

Dhaka University Central Students' Union (Bengali: ঢাকা বিশ্ববিদ্যালয় কেন্দ্রীয় ছাত্র সংসদ, romanized: ḍhaka biśśobiddalôẏ kendriẏo chatro śôṅśod), commonly known by its acronym DUCSU, is the official students' union of the University of Dhaka. Called the second parliament of Bangladesh, DUCSU represents Dhaka University students in the university's decision-making, acts as the voice for students in the national higher education policy debate, and provides direct services to the student body.

== History ==
This students' union was established in the academic year of 1923–24 as Dhaka University Student Union (DUSU). Its first constitution was drafted in its general assembly on 30 October 1925. In 1953, its constitution was amended, and the union was renamed Dhaka University Central Students' Union (DUCSU). In the same year, the first election by student vote was held. The first elected VP and GS by student vote were S. A. Bari and Julmat Ali Khan respectively. Since its establishment, DUCSU elections have been held a total of 38 times, 29 times before 1971 and 9 times after 1971. Unfortunately, this students' union was almost closed after the year 1990–91. Due to political turmoil between student groups, fear of opposition by the government and the disinterest of university officials, students could not elect their representatives for a long time. The last election was held on 9 September 2025.

== Constitution ==
The first constitution of DUCSU was adopted in 1925. According to the last amendment in 2025, DUCSU has an elected body of 28 students (previously 25), including the vice-president (VP), the general secretary (GS), the additional general secretary (AGS) and other posts. The chancellor of the university acts as the President of the Union, while other posts are elected from the student representatives. A teacher acts as the treasurer of the union. The University Senate has five student representatives designated from DUCSU, who take part in the policy-making meetings of the university and raise any kind of difficulties or demands on behalf of the students.

== Role in the politics of Bangladesh ==
DUCSU is called the second parliament of Bangladesh. The first flag of Bangladesh was raised by the then vice-president of DUCSU, A.S.M. Abdur Rab, on March 2, 1971. The importance of elected bodies under DUCSU is considered both in the light of the past role that DUCSU has played in national life, as well as in the transformation of university campus from political to social and cultural spaces.

== List of vice-presidents and general secretaries ==
| | Year | Vice-presidents | Affiliations | General secretaries | Affiliations |
|---|---|---|---|---|---|
| 1 | 1923–24 | Mamataj Uddin Ahmed | Independent | Jogendranath Sengupta | Independent |
| 2 | 1925–26 | Mamataj Uddin Ahmed | Independent | A K Mukherjee (acting A B Rudra) | Independent |
| 3 | 1927–28 | | | B K Adhikari | Independent |
| 4 | 1928–29 | A M Ajharul Islam | Independent | S. Chakrabarti | Independent |
| 5 | 1929–30 | Ramani Kanta Vattacharja | Independent | Kazi Rahamat Ali & Ataur Rahman | Independent |
| 6 | 1932–33 | | | Bhobesh Chakrabarty | Independent |
| 7 | 1933–34 | | | Bhobesh Chakrabarty | Independent |
| 8 | 1935–36 | | | A. H. M. A. Quader | Independent |
| 9 | 1936–37 | | | A. H. M. A. Quader | Independent |
| 10 | 1938–39 | | | Abdul Awal Khan | Independent |
| 11 | 1941–42 | | | Abdur Rahim | Independent |
| 12 | 1945–46 | Ahmadul Kabir | | Sudhir Dutta | |
| 13 | 1946-47 | Farid Ahmad | | Sudhir Dutta | |
| 14 | 1947–48 | Aravinda Ghosh | Independent | Ghulam Azam | |
| 15 | 1953–54 | S. A. Bari (Note: The first elected VP by student votes) | Independent | Julmat Ali Khan (Note: The first elected GS by student votes) & Farid Ahmed | Independent |
| 16 | 1954–55 | Nirod Bihari Nag | Independent | Abdur Rab Chowdhury | Independent |
| 17 | 1955–56 | Nirod Bihari Nag | Independent | Abdur Rab Chowdhury | Independent |
| 18 | 1956–57 | Ekramul Haque | Independent | Shah Ali Hossain | Independent |
| 19 | 1957–58 | Badrul Alam | Independent | Md. Fazli Hossain | Independent |
| 20 | 1958–59 | Shah M. Abul Hussain | Independent | A T M Mehedi | Independent |
| 21 | 1959–60 | Aminul Islam Tula | Independent | Ashrafuddin Makbul | Bangladesh Students Union |
| 22 | 1960–61 | Begam Jahanara Akhtar (Note: The first female VP of DUCSU) | Independent | Amulya Kumar | Independent |
| 23 | 1961–62 | S M Rafikul Haq | Independent | Enayetur Rahman | Independent |
| 24 | 1962–63 | Shyama Prasad Ghosh | Independent | K M Obaydur Rahman | Bangladesh Chhatra League |
| 25 | 1963–64 | Rashed Khan Menon | Bangladesh Students Union | Matia Chowdhury (Note: The only female GS of DUCSU) | Bangladesh Students Union |
| 26 | 1964–65 | Borhan Uddin | Bangladesh Students Union | Ashraf Ud-Doullah Pahloan | |
| 27 | 1966–67 | Ferdous Ahmed Koreshi | Bangladesh Chhatra League | Shafi Ahmed | Independent |
| 28 | 1967–68 | Mahfuza Khanam (Note: The second female VP of DUCSU) | Bangladesh Students Union | Morshed Ali | Bangladesh Students Union |
| 29 | 1968–69 1969-1970 | Tofayel Ahmed | Bangladesh Chhatra League | Nazim Kamran Choudhuri | National Students Federation (NSF) |
| 30 | 1970–71 | A.S.M. Abdur Rab (Note: Raised the first flag of Bangladesh on March 2, 1971) | Bangladesh Chhatra League | Abdul Kuddus Makhan | Bangladesh Chhatra League |
| 31 | 1972–73 | Mujahidul Islam Selim | Bangladesh Students Union | Mahbubur Zaman | Bangladesh Students Union |
| 32 | 1979–80 | Mahmudur Rahman Manna | Jasad Chhatra League | Akhtaruzzaman | Jasad Chhatra League |
| 33 | 1980–81 | Mahmudur Rahman Manna | BSD Chhatra League | Akhtaruzzaman | BSD Chhatra League |
| 34 | 1982–83 | Akhtaruzzaman | BSD Chhatra League | Zia Uddin Ahmed Bablu | BSD Chhatra League |
| 35 | 1989–90 | Sultan Mohammad Mansur Ahmed | Bangladesh Chhatra League | Mushtak Hossain | Bangladesh Chhatra League |
| 36 | 1990–91 | Amanullah Aman | Bangladesh Jatiotabadi Chatra Dal | Khairul Kabir Khokon | Bangladesh Jatiotabadi Chatra Dal |
| 37 | 2019–20 | Nurul Haque Nur | Bangladesh Chhatra Odhikar Parishad | Rashed Khan | Bangladesh Chhatra Odhikar Parishad |
| 38 | 2025–26 | Shadik Kayem | Bangladesh Islami Chhatra Shibir | S M Farhad | Bangladesh Islami Chhatra Shibir |

== See also ==
- Student politics of Bangladesh
