= AKM Faruque Ahmed Talukder =

Bangladeshi engineer and politician

Abdul Kalam Mohammad Faruque Ahmed Talukder (Note: Bengali: আব্দুল কালাম মোহাম্মদ ফারুক আহমেদ তালুকদার) is a Bangladeshi engineer, industrialist, philanthropist and politician who serves as the chairman of the Delta Group of Industries. He is a member of the National Executive Committee of the Bangladesh Nationalist Party.

== Career ==
=== Business ===
Kalam founded The Delta Group of Industries in 1998 and serves as its chairman. He is a member of Bangladesh Knitwear Manufacturers and Exporters Association, Bangladesh Garment Manufacturers and Exporters Association, Bangladesh Textile Mills Association, Bangladesh Garments Accessories & Packaging Manufacturers & Exporters Association.

Kalam founded the Engineer Faruk Talukder Mohila College in 1996. It is the only women's college in Bauphal Upazila.

=== Politics ===
Kalam joined the Bangladesh Nationalist Party and served as the President of Bauphal Upazila Bangladesh Nationalist Party. He also served as the Senior Vice President of Patuakhali District Bangladesh Nationalist Party. He contested the 2008 Bangladeshi general elections from Patuakhali-2 as a candidate of the Bangladesh Nationalist Party but lost to his rival A. S. M. Feroz by 40,000+ votes. Kalam was seeking nomination in Patuakhali-2 from the Bangladesh Nationalist Party for the 2026 Bangladeshi general election and held public rallies where he requested leaders, workers, and supporters of the Bangladesh Nationalist Party to work to implement the 31 Point Plan announced by Bangladesh Nationalist Party Chairman & Prime Minister Tarique Rahman.Supporters of Kalam and other nomination seekers have led various protest marches and rallies demanding the cancellation of Shahidul Alam Talukder's nomination.

== Allegations of corruption ==
On July 21, 2019 the Anti-Corruption Commission (Bangladesh) received allegations that Kalam had embezzled and smuggled more than 22,500,000,000 Bangladeshi taka abroad. The complaints also stated that the same properties were mortgaged multiple times against the loan and that even 50% of the loan could not be recovered by selling the properties.

On August 17, 2025, the Anti-Corruption Commission filed a case against Kalam, his Wife, Managing Director of the Delta Group of Industries and 13 others over alleged corruption and money laundering. According to the case documents those accused borrowed 589,000,000 Bangladeshi taka from Southeast Bank through nine bank accounts of the group. The total loan including interest and other charges was 1,593,500,000 Bangladeshi taka of which 910,000,000 Bangladeshi taka was paid but 682,700,000 Bangladeshi taka was allegedly embezzled. The Director General of the Anti-Corruption Commission said that 13 Officials of Southeast Bank committed irregularities in sanctioning and distributing the loan, he added that the bank authorities approved the loan proposal and released the money without fulfilling the terms and conditions and defying the banking rules and regulations. The Anti-Corruption Commission filed the case against the accused under sections 406, 409 and 109 of the Bangladesh Penal Code of 1960 and section 5(2) of the Corruption Prevention Act-1947.

== Electoral history ==
Year	Constituency	Party	Votes	%	Result
2008	Patuakhali-2	Bangladesh Nationalist Party	58,258	32.50	Lost

== Personal life ==
Kalam is married to Ferdous Ara Begum.
