= Adabaria =

Adabaria may refer to:

- Adabaria, Barguna, Bangladesh
- Adabaria, Patuakhali, Bangladesh
