= Bangladesh Islami Chhatra Shibir =

Bangladeshi student political organization

Bangladesh Islami Chhatra Shibir বাংলাদেশ ইসলামী ছাত্রশিবির
- Emblem of Bangladesh Islami Chhatra Shibir
- President: Nurul Islam Saddam
- Secretary General: Sibgatullah Sibga
- Spokesperson: Muhtasim Billah Shahedy
- Founded: 6 February 1977; 49 years ago
- Preceded by: East Pakistan Islami Chhatra Sangha (de jure; denied by the organisation)
- Headquarters: 48/A, Purana Paltan, Dhaka, Bangladesh
- Ideology: Islamism
- Colours: Sky blue
- National affiliation: Bangladesh Jamaat-e-Islami (de facto)
- International affiliation: IJT • AFMY • IIFSO • WAMY • SIO
- National Female affiliation: Bangladesh Islami Chhatri Sangstha (de facto)
- Magazine: Natun Kishore Kantho; Chhatra Sangbad
- Website: bangla.shibir.org.bd english.shibir.org.bd arabic.shibir.org.bd chhatrasangbadbd.com

Flag

Bangladesh Islami Chhatra Shibir, (Note: Bengali: বাংলাদেশ ইসলামী ছাত্রশিবির, romanized: Bāṅlādēś Islāmī Chātrôśibir, lit. 'Bangladesh Islamic Students' Camp', pronunciation: [ˈbaŋlaˌd̪eʃ ˈislaːmi ˈtʃʰat̪ɾoˌʃibiɾ]) commonly known as Chhatra Shibir, is a major Islamic male student organisation in Bangladesh that was established in 1977. While operating as an independent organization, it is ideologically aligned with the Bangladesh Jamaat-e-Islami. (Note: According to its constitution, Shibir maintains an independent organizational structure while sharing ideological goals with the Jamaat-e-Islami.)

The organization traces its historical origins to the East Pakistan Islami Chhatra Sangha. The legacy of its predecessor remains a subject of significant historical debate due to reported associations with the Al-Badr paramilitary force and its role during the Liberation War in 1971. The founding president of Chhatra Shibir, Mir Quasem Ali, previously served as the secretary general of Chhatra Sangha. However, the organization denies being a successor to or having any organizational linkage with Chhatra Sangha.

Between 2009 and 2024, Chhatra Shibir was subjected to repression by the Awami League and its student wing, the Bangladesh Chhatra League, and the organization's activities were effectively banned during this period. During this time, the organization's leaders and activists were accused of operating through covert political activities and of remaining under the patronage of the ruling party. The organization is considered to have played a significant role in the July Uprising in 2024. Following the uprising, the ban was lifted by the interim government, after which the organization gained nationwide prominence, winning in students' union elections at various universities.

== History ==
Before the independence of Bangladesh in 1971, the student wing of Jamaat-e-Islami was known as Islami Chhatra Sangha. The two organizations collaborated with the Pakistan Army and Al-Badr against the Mukti Bahini in the Bangladesh Liberation War. Islami Chhatra Sangha was involved in supporting militias, including involvement in the rape of women, murder of Bengalis, looting and burning of homes, and revealing locations of Mukti Bahini fighters. After independence, Article 38 of the 1972 Constitution of Bangladesh prohibited the misuse of religion for political purposes. Since the politics of Jamaat-e-Islami and its student organization were fundamentally based on religion, their organizational presence effectively disappeared in post-independence Bangladesh.

Following the assassination of Sheikh Mujibur Rahman, President Abu Sadat Mohammad Sayem issued an ordinance on 3 May 1976 repealing Article 38 of the Constitution of Bangladesh, thereby lifting the ban on religion-based politics. Subsequently, Bangladesh Islami Chhatra Shibir was established on 6 February 1977 at the central mosque of Dhaka University, and Mir Quasem Ali was the founding president.

Their stated mission is "to seek the pleasure of Allah (SWT) by moulding entire human life in accordance with the code, bestowed by Allah (SWT) and exemplified by His Messenger".

The organisation was under pressure from the previous administration led by the Awami League and its student wing, the Bangladesh Chhatra League. Shibir, along with its parent organization, Jamaat-e-Islami, was fully banned by the Awami League regime on 1 August 2024. However, the ban was withdrawn by the Yunus-led interim government on 28 August 2024.

Shibir took part in the 2025 DUCSU elections along with their alliance called "United Students' Alliance" and won in over 14 high ranks, including Vice President and GS for the first time in Bangladesh's history after 1971. Shadik Kayem and Shibir-backed SM Farhad won in VP and GS votings. This was eventually the first time that a Islamist organization won the DUCSU election.

== Funding ==
Shibir members, who are students of educational institutions and establishments, are expected to donate monthly in the name of Baitul Maal (party fund). There are also several publications of Islami Chhatra Shibir that are sold in educational institutions.

== Leadership ==
List of Central Presidents and Secretaries General
Session	Central President	Later role/Affiliation	Secretary General	Later role/Affiliation
Jan 2026 – Present	Nurul Islam Saddam		Sibgatullah Sibga	
Jan 2025 – Dec 2025	Jahidul Islam		Nurul Islam Saddam	
Jan 2024 – Dec 2024	Manjurul Islam		Jahidul Islam	
Jan 2023 – Dec 2023	Rajibur Rahman		Manjurul Islam	
Jan 2022 – Dec 2022	Rashedul Islam	Member of Parliament	Rajibur Rahman	
Jan 2021 – Dec 2021	Salahuddin Aiyubi	Member of Parliament	Rashedul Islam	Member of Parliament
Jan 2020 – Dec 2020	Sirajul Islam		Salahuddin Aiyubi	Member of Parliament
Jan 2019 – Dec 2019	Mubarak Hossain		Sirajul Islam	
Jan 2018 – Dec 2018	Yasin Arafat		Mubarak Hossain	
Jan 2017 – Dec 2017	Yasin Arafat		Mubarak Hossain	
Jan 2016 – Dec 2016	Atikur Rahman		Yasin Arafat	
Jan 2015 – Dec 2015	Mohammad Abdul Jabbar		Atikur Rahman	
Jan 2014 – Dec 2014	Mohammad Abdul Jabbar		Atikur Rahman	
Jan 2013 – Dec 2013	Delwar Hossain		Mohammad Abdul Jabbar	
Jan 2012 – Dec 2012	Delwar Hossain		Mohammad Abdul Jabbar	
Jan 2011 – Dec 2011	Muhammad Fakhruddin Manik		Delwar Hossain	
Jan 2010 – Dec 2010	Muhammad Rezaul Karim		Muhammad Fakhruddin Manik	
Jan 2009 – Dec 2009	Muhammad Rezaul Karim		Shishir Mohammad Munir	
Jan 2008 – Dec 2008	Muhammad Zahidur Rahman		Muhammad Rezaul Karim	
Jan 2007 – Dec 2007	Shafiqul Islam Masud	Member of Parliament	Muhammad Zahidur Rahman	
Jan 2006 – Dec 2006	Shafiqul Islam Masud	Member of Parliament	Muhammad Zahidur Rahman	
Jan 2005 – Dec 2005	Muhammad Selim Uddin		Shafiqul Islam Masud	Member of Parliament
Jan 2004 – Dec 2004	Muhammad Selim Uddin		Shafiqul Islam Masud	Member of Parliament
Jan 2003 – Dec 2003	Mojibur Rahman Bhuiyan Monju	Politician	Muhammad Selim Uddin	Politician
Jan 2002 – Dec 2002	Nurul Islam Bulbul	Member of Parliament	Mojibur Rahman Bhuiyan Monju	
Jan 2001 – Dec 2001	Nurul Islam Bulbul	Member of Parliament	Muhammad Nazrul Islam	
Jan 2000 – Dec 2000	Ehsanul Mahbub Jobair		Nurul Islam Bulbul	Ehsanul Mahbub Jobair
Jan 1999 – Dec 1999	Matiur Rahman Akand	Politician and lawyer	Ehsanul Mahbub Jobair	
Jan 1998 – Dec 1998	Matiur Rahman Akand	Politician and lawyer	A.S.M. Mamun Shahin	
Jan 1997 – Dec 1997	Muhammad Shahjahan	Politician	Matiur Rahman Akand	
Jan 1996 – Dec 1996	Muhammad Shahjahan	Politician	Manjurul Islam Bhuiyan	
Jan 1995 – Dec 1995	Muhammad Rafiqul Islam Khan	Member of Parliament	Abul Hasnat Md. Abdul Halim	
Jan 1994 – Dec 1994	Muhammad Rafiqul Islam Khan	Member of Parliament	Abul Hasnat Md. Abdul Halim	
Jan 1993 – Dec 1993	Barrister Hamid Hossain Azad		Muhammad Rafiqul Islam Khan	Member of Parliament
Jan 1992 – Dec 1992	Abu Jafar Muhammad Obaidullah	Poet and educator	Barrister Hamid Hossain Azad	
Jan 1991 – Dec 1991	Aminul Islam Mukul	Physician	Abu Jafar Muhammad Obaidullah	Poet and educator
Jan 1990 – Dec 1990	Aminul Islam Mukul	Physician	–	
Jan 1989 – Dec 1989	A N M Shamsul Islam	Member of Parliament	Aminul Islam Mukul	Physician
Jan 1988 – Dec 1988	A N M Shamsul Islam	Member of Parliament	–	
Jan 1987 – Dec 1987	Syed Abdullah Muhammad Taher	Member of Parliament	A N M Shamsul Islam	Member of Parliament
Jan 1986 – Dec 1986	Syed Abdullah Mohammed Taher	Member of Parliament	–	
Jan 1985 – Dec 1985	Muhammad Tasneem Alam		Syed Abdullah Mohammed Taher	Member of Parliament
Oct 1983 – Dec 1984	Muhammad Tasneem Alam		–	
May 1982 – Oct 1983	Saiful Alam Khan Milon	Member of Parliament	Muhammad Tasneem Alam	
Jan 1982 – May 1982	Ahmad Abdul Qader		Farid Ahmed Reza	
Oct 1981 – Jan 1982	Enamul Haq Manju	Member of Parliament	Ahmad Abdul Qader	
Oct 1979 – Oct 1981	Maulana Muhammad Abu Taher	Politician and educator	Enamul Haq Manju	Member of Parliament
Oct 1978 – Oct 1979	Muhammad Kamaruzzaman	Politician and journalist	Maulana Muhammad Abu Taher	Politician and educator
Feb 1977 – Oct 1978	Mir Quasem Ali	Politician & businessman	Muhammad Abdul Bari & Muhammad Kamaruzzaman	Physicist and educationalist & Politician and journalist

== Criticism ==
=== Bangladesh War of Independence ===
Islami Chhatra Shibir, the student wing of Jamaat-e-Islami Bangladesh, was formally established on 6 February 1977.

After independence, the Bangladesh government, led by Sheikh Mujibur Rahman, banned Jamaat-e-Islami and its affiliate organizations due to the ban on religion-based politics. Jamaat-e-Islami has been challenging this portrayal, claiming the convictions are politically motivated.

=== Militant association and armed activities ===
Islami Chhatra Shibir (ICS) has been accused by security analysts and government sources of maintaining active links with various Islamist militant groups, including Harkat-ul-Jihad-al-Islami (HuJI) and Jama'at-ul-Mujahideen Bangladesh (JMB), and of assisting in member recruitment, indoctrination, and logistical supply for jihadi activities. These relationships are reported to extend to Pakistan's Inter-Services Intelligence (ISI) and networks linked to terrorist organizations in Afghanistan and South Asia. ICS is also accused of assisting in the establishment of secret training camps and weapons stockpiles within Bangladesh, sending young cadres to Pakistan and Afghanistan for militant training during the Taliban era, and also having connections to Osama bin Laden's network.

Allegations of direct armed activities primarily revolve around incidents of ICS members possessing and using firearms, bombs, and other weapons during campus clashes with rival student organizations like the Bangladesh Chhatra League (BCL) and the Jatiyatabadi Chhatra Dal (JCD). On 1 July 1996, at least 25 students were injured when ICS activists carried out an armed attack at Jahangirnagar University, and 48 people were arrested in connection with this incident. A similar incident occurred on 24 July 1996 at Sitakunda College, where ICS and BCL activists exchanged gunfire alongside detonating crackers, resulting in multiple injuries; and on 14 August 1996, ICS members threw bombs at a BCL rally at Chittagong University.

There is evidence of former ICS members being involved in militant activities. For example, Abdur Rahim, a former ICS member who joined JMB in 2002 and participated in terrorist activities. In August 2024, the Sheikh Hasina-led Bangladesh government, citing involvement in terrorist activities amid violent protests, temporarily banned ICS's parent organization Jamaat-e-Islami, along with its other affiliate organizations; although the interim administration later lifted this ban on Jamaat. But ICS claims these allegations to be politically motivated. In February 2014, US-based defence think tank IHS Jane's published a report titled "IHS Jane's 2013 Global Terrorism & Insurgency Attack Index", where Shibir ranked third in a list of most active non-state armed groups in 2013; Shibir denied the claim. According to reports in 2013 and 2014 by The Daily Star and New Age, courts in Rajshahi and Chittagong found no conclusive evidence linking the central leadership of Shibir to arms recovery incidents or communal violence. Human rights organizations, including Odhikar, have also reported concerns about politically motivated arrests and extrajudicial actions targeting student activists, particularly from opposition-affiliated organizations such as Shibir.

=== Violence and conflict ===
Islami Chhatra Shibir has been repeatedly accused by rival student organizations, government authorities, and human rights observers of engaging in violent clashes on university campuses where there is rivalry over political control. Central to these allegations is the use of crude weapons such as sticks, machetes, and petrol bombs by Shibir members during confrontations with groups like the Bangladesh Chhatra League (BCL), the student wing of the Awami League. International reports have noted that while both sides contribute to the cycle of violence in Bangladesh's polarized student politics, Shibir's Islamist ideology has been linked to specifically targeted attacks on secular or minority students. The group was described by the National Consortium for the Study of Terrorism and Responses to Terrorism as extremely militant and "linked to a number of larger terrorist organizations both in Bangladesh, and internationally". Shibir activists, leaders, and supporters were also involved in attacking opposition party members and leaders from BCL, JCD, and JCS by cutting their tendons since the 1980s.

During the 2013 protests, following the war crimes conviction of Jamaat-e-Islami leader Delwar Hossain Sayedee on 28 February, Shibir supporters, alongside Jamaat supporters, carried out widespread arson and vandalism and launched attacks on Hindu minorities. In several districts, including Noakhali and Jessore, more than 40 Hindu temples and hundreds of homes were damaged or looted. Dozens of people died nationwide in these incidents.

More recently, on 28 May 2025, at Rajshahi University, Shibir-affiliated members of the "Anti-Shahbag Unity" group clashed with leftist activists. At least 10 people were injured in a clash involving chases and counter-chases with sticks across the campus. According to Bangladeshi newspapers, extremist Shibir supporters attacked the organizers to disrupt an event. As per data from organizations monitoring conflict, Shibir was involved in dozens of such clashes annually.

=== Others ===
According to a report, on 20 September 1981, after the Jafar-Adar Panel, supported by the Bangladesh Chhatra League, won the Chittagong College Student Council election, a victory procession was organized. During this procession, Chhatra Shibir supporters launched a counter-procession, and an injured individual was killed after being abducted.

According to a report by Jugantor, on 31 May 1988, Jamil Akhtar Ratan, a left-wing activist and convener of Chhatra Moitree's Rajshahi Medical College unit, was publicly murdered by slitting his tendons. Allegations suggest that following this incident, Chhatra Shibir established exclusive control over educational institutions in the area.

In February 2025, accusations were raised against Chhatra Shibir members for torturing a student overnight and attempting to sever the veins of his legs at the MC College dormitory in Sylhet over a Facebook status. The student was seriously injured in the attack and was then admitted to a hospital. In this incident, the anti-discrimination student movement announced a protest program, and the Sylhet Metropolitan Unit of Jamaat-e-Islami expressed regret over the involvement of Chhatra Shibir activists in the attack. However, Chhatra Shibir denied the allegation and condemned its parent organisation Jamaat's statement.

On July 27, 2026, Rajshahi University Central Students Union (RUCSU) General Secretary Salahuddin Ammar and leaders of Islami Chhatra Shibir entered the Rajshahi University library and attacked 3 students alleging them as Bangladesh Chattra League members. Shibir members claimed that they acted after being attacked first.

== Crackdowns ==
Since 2010, Shibir has been targeted by repeated crackdowns. The former Awami League—led regime insisted that it is necessary to maintain public order and stop attacks on police. Since 2010, raids on student residences were carried out at random, and Shibir supporters found were detained. In 2010, government agencies received orders to conduct operations necessary to identify Shibir elements in educational institutions all around Bangladesh and crack down on their influence. Arbitrary arrests as police have made no efforts at the time of arrest to separate ordinary student members of the Chhatra Shibir from those suspected of involvement in the attacks and were denied Legal counsel.

On 4 November 2018, police raided the Chittagong city headquarters of Chhatra Shibir and later filed a case against 90 Chittagong Shibir men over the recovery of explosives. It was the biggest police crackdown against Shibir in recent times. Although the organisation denied any link to the incident and protested strongly against the case.

=== Enforced disappearances ===
On 5 February 2012, approximately at 1:00 a.m., Al Mukaddas (22), a fourth-year student of the Department of Al Fiqah, and Mohammad Waliullah (23), a master's candidate of the Dawah and Islamic Studies Department of Islamic University, were allegedly arrested and disappeared by some people who identified themselves as Rapid Action Battalion (RAB) and Detective Branch (DB) of Bangladesh Police from Savar, Dhaka. Both were later found to be members of Shibir, and were allegedly detained by members of the RAB and the DB of the police on 4 February. They have not been heard from since, and their whereabouts are unknown. The RAB has denied detaining the two men in a statement to a Bangladeshi newspaper. However, reports from several sources and a pattern of disappearances thought to have been conducted by RAB in recent months cast doubt on RAB's denial. Amnesty International, along with other rights organizations, expressed their concern over this issue and called for urgent action.

On 5 April 2013 at around 2:25 a.m., RAB arrested Mohammad Anwarul Islam and Mosammat Nurjahan Begum of Angariapara village in Chapainawabganj from Rajpara Thana in Rajshahi District. Later, when family members contacted the RAB office, RAB notified that Anwarul had never been arrested by them. An allegation of enforced disappearance was brought against the members of RAB by Anwarul's family members. Upon inquiry, it was found that Anwarul was a last-year master's student in the mathematics department of Rajshahi College. Moreover, he was the office secretary of the Chhatra Shibir Branch in Rajshahi District.

On 21 October 2024, family members of six Shibir leaders filed complaints against RAB and DB in the International Crimes Tribunal over allegations of enforced disappearances. The Shibir leaders mentioned in the complaint are Shah Md. Waliullah, Md. Mokaddes Ali, Hafez Zakir Hossain, Zainal Abedin, Rezwan Hossain, and Md. Kamruzzaman. Shibir's Deputy Secretary for Legal Affairs, Amanullah Al Jihadi, stated that on 6 August, family members went to the RAB headquarters seeking information on the missing leaders but have yet to receive any information.

== Recent activities ==
Following the ouster of Prime Minister Sheikh Hasina on 5 August 2024, the interim government led by Muhammad Yunus lifted the ban on Bangladesh Jamaat-e-Islami and its student wing, Islami Chhatra Shibir, on 28 August 2024. Despite being labeled a terrorist organization during the July–August 2024 uprising, Shibir members had provided direct and indirect support in various ways, including logistical assistance and participation in protests. This involvement, as well as the lifting of the restrictions, allowed Shibir to re-emerge on university campuses. They formed alliances with the uprising coordinators of the National Citizen Party and outmaneuvered rivals like Chhatra League, the student wing of the Awami League.

As Islamist influence in student politics grew in 2025, Shibir-backed candidates achieved significant victories in university student union elections. On 8 September 2025, a Shibir-backed panel secured a decisive victory in the Dhaka University Central Students' Union election, capturing key posts despite low voter turnout and competition from divided secular groups. Similarly, on 12 September 2025, Shibir affiliates won the Jahangirnagar University Students' Union election. By 15 October 2025, Shibir established dominance in the Chittagong University Central Students' Union election, winning 24 out of 26 posts, including the vice-president and various hall union seats, through strategic organization against disorganized opponents like the Jatiyatabadi Chhatra Dal. These successes reflected a broader trend of Islamist influence in the post-uprising academic sphere, and analysts credited Shibir's grassroots activities and the interim government's tolerance for this success.

Shibir's victory in major institutions like Dhaka and Jahangirnagar Universities created a foundation for Jamaat-e-Islami's broader programs, including campaigning for Islamic constitutional reforms, raising concerns among secular observers about a right-wing political shift. But Shibir leaders emphasized their role as protectors of student rights, distanced themselves from the political violence, and portrayed these victories as an endorsement of their anti-corruption stance during the 2024 events. Despite such claims, reports of underlying tensions with non-Islamist groups from the uprising continued, highlighting Shibir's opportunistic resurgence amidst Bangladesh's divided transitional politics.

At last, Chhatra Shibir won in total five students' union elections described as a 'landslide victory'. The last one was Jagannath University Central Students Union (JnUCSU) election, winning 16 of the 21 posts.

== See also ==
- Kishore Kantho
- Bangladesh Islami Chhatri Sangstha
- List of student organizations in Bangladesh
