= Shafiqul Islam Masud =

Bangladeshi politician

- শফিকুল ইসলাম মাসুদ

Member of Parliament
- Incumbent
- Assumed office 16 February 2026
- Preceded by: A. S. M. Feroz
- Constituency: Patuakhali-2

President of Bangladesh Islami Chhatra Shibir
- In office 2006–2007
- Preceded by: Muhammad Selim Uddin
- Succeeded by: Muhammad Zahidur Rahman

Secretary General of Bangladesh Islami Chhatra Shibir
- In office 2004–2005
- Preceded by: Muhammad Selim Uddin
- Succeeded by: Muhammad Zahidur Rahman

Personal details
- Born: 1 March 1978 (age 48) Madanpura, Bauphal, Patuakhali, Barisal
- Party: Bangladesh Jamaat-e-Islami
- Spouse: Zakia Farhana
- Children: 3 children: 1 daughter 2 sons
- Education: University of Rajshahi (BA, MA, PhD)
- Occupation: Politician, writer

Shafiqul Islam Masud is a central Majlis-e-Shura member of Bangladesh Jamaat-e-Islami, a member of its central executive council, and the Secretary of Dhaka Metropolitan South. He is a member of parliament from Patuakhali-2 (Bauphal) constituency in the 2026 Bangladeshi general election. He is also a former central president of Bangladesh Islami Chhatra Shibir.

== Education ==
Shafiqul Islam passed the Dakhil and Alim examinations in the first division. He then obtained his B.A. (Honours) and M.A. degrees in Bangla Language and Literature from the University of Rajshahi. He later earned a PhD (Doctorate) degree from the same university.

== Political career ==
He served as the President of Bangladesh Islami Chhatra Shibir at Rajshahi University from 2002 to 2003. Later, he served as the Central President of the organization from 2006 to 2007. Currently, he is a member of the Central Executive Council of Bangladesh Jamaat-e-Islami and serves as the Secretary of Dhaka Metropolitan South and now the member of parliament of Patuakhali-2.

== Personal life ==
He is married to Dr. Zakia Farhana, an eye specialist. They have one daughter and two sons.
