= Ruhul Amin (Patuakhali politician) =

Bangladeshi politician

- রুহুল আমিন

Member of Parliament for Patuakhali-2
- In office 3 March 1988 – 6 December 1990
- Preceded by: ASM Feroz
- Succeeded by: ASM Feroz

Personal details
- Born: c. 1949 Patuakhali
- Died: 24 August 2014
- Party: Jatiya Party

Ruhul Amin (c. 1949–25 August 2014) was a politician from Patuakhali District of Bangladesh. He was elected a member of parliament from Patuakhali-2 in the 1988 Bangladeshi general election.

== Career ==
Ruhul Amin was a member of the Central Executive Committee of the Jatiya Party. He joined the Jatiya Party in 1982. He was elected a member of parliament from the Patuakhali-2 constituency as an Jatiya Party candidate in the 1988 Bangladeshi general election. He was defeated in the Patuakhali-2 constituency as a candidate of Jatiya Party in the fifth parliamentary elections of 1991 and the seventh parliamentary elections of 12 June 1996.

== Death ==
Ruhul Amin died on 24 August 2014.
