= Yaqub Ali Sharif =

Bangladeshi politician

- ইয়াকুব আলী শরীফ

Member of Parliament for Patuakhali-2
- In office 15 February 1996 – 12 June 1996
- Preceded by: A. S. M. Feroz
- Succeeded by: A. S. M. Feroz

Personal details
- Born: Patuakhali District
- Party: Bangladesh Nationalist Party

Yaqub Ali Sharif is a politician of Patuakhali District of Bangladesh, physician and former member of parliament for the Patuakhali-2 constituency.

== Career ==
Yaqub Ali Sharif was elected a member of parliament for Patuakhali-2 as a Bangladesh Nationalist Party candidate in the February 1996 Bangladeshi general election. He was a professor at Sher-e-Bangla Medical College.

He established 'Dr. Yakub Sharif Degree College' in 1993 in Baga Union No.7 of Baufal Upazila in Patuakhali District.
