= Kanakdia Union =

Kanakdia Union Parishad কনকদিয়া
- Location in Bangladesh
- Coordinates: 22°25.8′N 90°30.8′E
- Country: Bangladesh
- Division: Barisal Division
- District: Patuakhali District

Area
  - Total: 28.09 km^{2} (10.85 sq mi)

Population (2011)
  - Total: 19,519
  - Density: 694.9/km^{2} (1,800/sq mi)
- Time zone: UTC+6 (BST)
- PostCode: 8620
- Website: kanakdiaup.patuakhali.gov.bd

Kanakdia (Bengali: কনকদিয়া) is a Union of Bauphal Upazila, Patuakhali; in the Division of Barisal, Bangladesh.

== Geography ==
The area of Konakdia Union is 6,941 acres.

== Administrative structure ==
This Union Parishad is under Bauphal Upazila. Administrative activities of this union are under the jurisdiction of Bauphal police station. It is part of Jatiya Sangsad Constituency No. 112 Patuakhali-2.

=== Constituency Area ===
- Jhilna - Kalta
- Birpasha
- Amirabad
- Jayghora
- Hogla
- Narayanpasha
- Kumvokhali - Kathikul
- Ayla
- Kanakdia

== Population data ==
According to the Bangladesh Bureau of Statistics, the total population of Konkadia Union is 19,519. Of these, 7,624 are males and 10,795 are females. Total families are 4,461.
