= Abduction of Waliullah and Al Muqaddas =

- Part of Enforced disappearances in Bangladesh
- Location of the abduction in Nabinagar, Savar, Bangladesh Location of the abduction in Nabinagar, Savar, Bangladesh
- Location: 23.8701°N 90.2714°E; Nabinagar, Savar, Dhaka, Bangladesh
- Date: February 5, 2012; 00:30–01:00 (BST)
- Target: Muhammad Waliullah; Al-Muqaddas
- Attack type: Abduction/Enforced disappearance
- Weapon: Unknown
- Victims: Muhammad Waliullah; Al-Muqaddas
- Perpetrator: Alleged members of Rapid Action Battalion (RAB-4)
- Assailants: 8–10 unidentified individuals
- No. of participants: 8–10
- Motive: Unknown, possibly political
- Inquiry: General Diaries filed at Darus Salam and Ashulia Police Stations; High Court writ petitions
- Charges: Abduction (Penal Code Section 34)
- Litigation: Two writ petitions filed in the High Court; Appellate Division dismissed the petitions
- Judge: Justice Abdul Awal; Justice Md; Akram Hossain Chowdhury; Justice Syed Mahmud Hossain; Justice Bazlur Rahman
- The incident drew international criticism from Amnesty International, Human Rights Watch, and the UN Human Rights Council. Bangladesh Islami Chhatra Shibir has protested since 2012, demanding the victims' release.

The Waliullah and Al Muqaddas abduction is an incident in the history of enforced disappearances in Bangladesh that took place in 2012. In this case of disappearance, the government faced criticism. Amnesty International expressed concern over the incident and called for urgent action. The working group of the United Nations Human Rights Council listed these two individuals as numbers 9 and 10 among 76 persons who disappeared in Bangladesh. Additionally, the World Organization Against Torture, Human Rights Watch, and the International Federation for Human Rights criticized the disappearance and included it in their respective lists. Both of them were active members of the Islami Chhatra Shibir of the Islamic University, Kushtia branch. After the disappearance of these two members, Chhatra Shibir members held protests and demonstrations across Bangladesh. From 2012 to 2024, Chhatra Shibir members have been demanding their release from disappearance.

== Background ==
On February 5, 2012, at around 1:00 a.m., Muhammad Waliullah, a master's student in the Department of Da'wah and Islamic Studies at the Islamic University, and Al-Muqaddas, a fourth-year student in the Department of Al-Fiqh and Legal Studies, were abducted by individuals identifying themselves as members of RAB. Al-Muqaddas was a resident of Khanakuniari village in Ward 2, Kadamtali Union, under the Sadar Police Station of Pirojpur District. His father's name is Maulana Abdul Halim. Waliullah was from the village of Paschim Soljalia in Soljalia Union, Kathalia Upazila, Jhalokathi District. His father's name is Maulana Fazlur Rahman. Both of them were active members of Bangladesh Islami Chhatra Shibir. Waliullah was then serving as the Finance Secretary of the Islamic University branch, and Muqaddas as the Cultural Secretary. Both of them lived in Room 211 of the Deshi Block of Bangabandhu Sheikh Mujibur Rahman Hall at Kushtia Islamic University.

On February 2, Al-Muqaddas came to 8/2 Shantibagh area of Malibagh to his uncle's house from Kushtia Islamic University to release a patriotic music album. On February 3, his friend and roommate Waliullah came to Dhaka for printing press work, and both of them stayed in the Malibagh area. After finishing their work, on the evening of February 4, Muqaddas and Waliullah boarded the Hanif Paribahan bus number 3750 from Kallyanpur Bus Stand in Dhaka. The bus had departed from Kallyanpur towards Islamic University with tickets purchased. Around 12:30 to 1:00 a.m., the vehicle carrying them got stuck in traffic in the Nabinagar area under Savar Police Station. At that time, a group of 8–10 people identifying themselves as RAB-4 conducted a search on the bus. They then took Muqaddas and Waliullah off the bus. According to the bus supervisor, shortly after midnight on February 5, they were forcibly taken off the bus.

== Case ==
The day after the disappearance, on February 6, Muqaddas's uncle Abdul Hai filed a General Diary (GD) and a complaint at the Darus Salam Police Station in Mirpur regarding the abduction of Muqaddas. On February 8, Waliullah's elder brother Khaled Saifullah filed a GD at Ashulia Police Station for his missing brother. After that, the families of the missing began searching for them through RAB, the police, and the administration. But the police and RAB denied involvement in picking them up and expressed their inability to provide any information about the two students. Meanwhile, SI Zakaria was assigned the investigation of the GD after the previous SI at Ashulia Police Station was transferred. He himself filed an abduction case under Penal Code Section 34 and took on the role of the investigating officer. As a result, the two families filed two writ petitions in the High Court. On February 15, a bench composed of Justice Abdul Awal and Justice Md. Akram Hossain Chowdhury held a hearing. The judges issued a rule asking why they should not be presented physically before the court. Nine officials, including the Home Secretary and the Inspector General of Police, were asked to respond to the rule within three weeks. RAB issued a statement denying the allegations of detaining the two individuals.

Within the designated three weeks, the nine officials failed to locate the two students. After that, the state appealed to the Appellate Division. On May 9, Appellate Division Chamber Judge Justice Syed Mahmud Hossain stayed the High Court's summoning order and directed that leave-to-appeal be filed against the High Court's order. After the hearing on the leave-to-appeal, the Appellate Division overturned the High Court order and directed the disposal of the writ petition. A bench of the Appellate Division, composed of Justice Bazlur Rahman and Justice Akram Hossain Chowdhury, reviewed several observations and dismissed the writ petition.

== Allegations of harassment ==
Family members of the disappeared individuals alleged that after filing the writ petition, DB police members repeatedly raided their relatives' homes late at night. Threats were made through calls from unknown mobile numbers, and they were pressured not to escalate the matter. Even Al Muqaddas's uncle, who resides in Malibagh, felt unsafe staying at his home.

== Protest and reactions ==
=== International ===
The World Organization Against Torture expressed deep concern over the incident and criticized the Government of Bangladesh. The Working Group on Enforced or Involuntary Disappearances of the United Nations Human Rights Council expressed concern about disappearances in Bangladesh. In 2022, they provided a list of 76 disappeared persons, with Waliullah and Al Muqaddas listed at serial numbers 9 and 10. Amnesty International expressed concern regarding this disappearance in the context of human rights and called for urgent action. Amnesty International repeatedly issued strong criticisms and public statements regarding the disappearance. British consultant psychiatrist and former police sergeant Dr. Ali Jahan criticized the government and remarked that it has become a "repertoire." Human Rights Watch opposed and criticized the disappearance of Waliullah and Muqaddas through illustrated reports and featured photos. The French international organization International Federation for Human Rights (FIDH) extensively criticized disappearances in Bangladesh and included Al Muqaddas's name as number 27 on its list. The United Nations High Commissioner for Refugees and the United States Department of State expressed concern about the two missing individuals in the 2013 report.

=== National ===
Bangladesh Islami Chhatra Shibir termed the incident a case of state-enforced disappearance. Since 2012, teachers and students of Islamic University who support Islami Chhatra Shibir have, from time to time, organized human chains and protests against the disappearance. On February 8, 2012, a human chain was organized on the Islamic University campus by Islami Chhatra Shibir and their supporters. On March 18, as a form of protest, members of Chhatra Shibir organized protest marches at Kushtia Islamic University, in Kushtia town, and in Monirampur of Jessore and Manikganj. On February 10, the families of the disappeared held a press conference at the National Press Club, and on February 11, they held a human chain in front of the National Press Club. In March, sit-in strikes by students and teachers were held for two consecutive days. Later, in 2017, relatives of the two disappeared students held a press conference at Barisal Reporters' Unity demanding information on the missing students. On December 10, 2024, a human chain was organized by the Islamic University Human Rights Support Society. They also demanded the formation of an investigation committee to uncover the reason behind the disappearance. The Bangladeshi human rights organization "Odhikar" published a fact-finding report accusing RAB and DB police, which later attracted international media attention.

== Subsequent situation ==
After the fall of the Sheikh Hasina government on August 5 in a mass uprising, many fugitive Chhatra Shibir members involved in various criminal allegations began to resurface publicly. As the two missing students could not be found, Chhatra Shibir officially filed a complaint regarding the disappearance with the International Crimes Tribunal on October 21, 2024. Additionally, a businessman named Humayun Kabir filed a case against 42 individuals including former Prime Minister Sheikh Hasina, mentioning the enforced disappearance of Waliullah and Al Muqaddas along with other members of Chhatra Shibir. Furthermore, to ensure a safe campus, the Islamic University Chhatra Shibir submitted a 110-point demand to the administration, which included a demand for an investigation into the disappearance of Waliullah and Muqaddas.
