= Muneer Fareed =

Muslim scholar

- Education: University of Michigan, Ann Arbor
- Scientific career
- Fields: Islamic studies, Intellectual Islam
- Workplaces: Wayne State University, University of Cape Town

Muneer Goolam Fareed (born 1956) is a Muslim scholar and the former secretary general of ISNA (Islamic Society of North America).

== Biography ==
Muneer Fareed is a South African citizen of Indian descent. He studied Arabic language and literature at King Abdulaziz University, Mecca and got a theological license in Islamic studies (Ijazah) from the Darul Uloom Deoband, India. Fareed moved to the U.S. in 1989 and obtained his Ph.D. in 1994 from the University of Michigan, with his dissertation entitled, "Legal Reform in the Muslim world: The anatomy of a scholarly dispute in the 19th and the early 20th centuries on the usage of Ijtihad as a legal tool." He worked as an imam of the Islamic Association of Greater Detroit from 1989 to 2000 and was an associate professor of Islamic studies at Wayne State University until 2006. He succeeded Sayyid Syeed as the new secretary general of the Islamic Society of North America in late 2006. Fareed is also a member of the Fiqh Council of North America.
