= Asian Federation of Muslim Youth =

Islamic organization based in Mecca, Saudi Arabia

- President: Dr 'Abdul Muntaqim Abu Bakar (Malaysia)
- Founded: 2000 in Mecca, Saudi Arabia
- Headquarters: Secretary General Office, Kampung Tok Jiring, Kuala Terengganu, Malaysia
- International affiliation: International Islamic Federation of Student Organizations
- Website: http://afmyasia.org

The Asian Federation of Muslim Youth (AFMY; Malay: Persekutuan Belia Islam Asia), which was formally established in 2001/1422H, is an umbrella organisation of the Muslim youth and student organisations working at the national level in the Asian continent.

The primary objective is to create a forum to discuss the activities, strategies, problems and experiences, and to co-ordinate and strengthen communication and exchange views. It aims to train community leaders to run these organisations in different countries and to encourage them to think and develop their own resources and to analyse the situation in the light of the Qur'an and Sunnah, take decisions through mutual consultations (Shoura) and work for the establishment of the Islamic equality and social justice.

It hopes to evolve common training programs, action plans and campaign to present Islam in the contemporary parlance. It will strive for the protection of the rights of youth and students to form organisations in areas where there is no such bodies in action.

The General Secretariat is based in Colombo. It has liaison offices in Kuala Lumpur, London, New York and the UAE

== See also ==
- World Assembly of Muslim Youth
- International Islamic Federation of Student Organizations
