= Bishweshwar Pal =

Potter

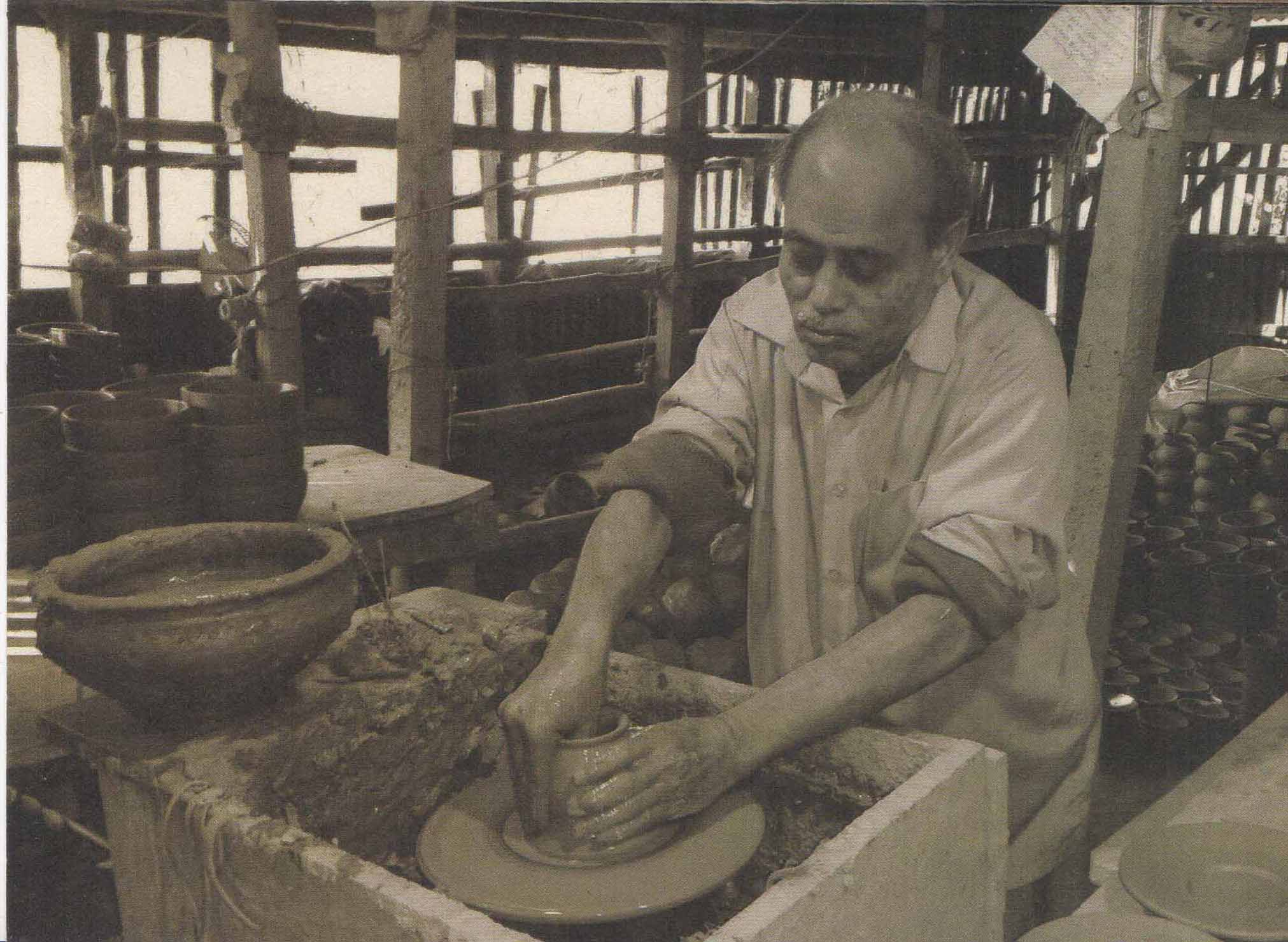
Bishweshwar Pal

Bishweshwar Pal is a terracotta artist from Bangladesh.

Pal was born to Oshchurta Pal and mother Soudamini Pal on 3 January 1952 in Bauphal Upazilla, Madanpura village, Patuakhali. The river drawn region is familiar for its soil which is as good as to produce exceptional terracotta items. His parents had also been involved with traditional crafts business that enhance the quality of livelihood of this region. From the boyhood Bishweshwar had an eye on craftsmanship. He used to work with his parents for a new hope to shape the industry. The terracotta art has spread across the country and being exported to Europe, Australia and USA.

== Award and achievements ==
In 2016, Pal received the Lifetime Achievement Award from the Terracotta Seminar and Award

In 2017, Pal received a Lifetime Achievement Award from the Bangladesh Small & Cottage Industries Corporation (BSCIC) for his long standing contribution in pottery.

He received the 2017 Lifetime Master Craftsperson Award from the National Crafts Council of Bangladesh.
