= Patuakhali-2 =

Constituency of Bangladesh's Jatiya Sangsad

Coordinates: 22.41°N 90.56°E

- Constituency for the Jatiya Sangsad
- District: Patuakhali District
- Division: Barisal Division
- Electorate: 251,873 (2018)

Current constituency
- Created: 1973
- ← 111 Patuakhali-1 113 Patuakhali-3 →

Patuakhali-2 is a constituency represented in the Jatiya Sangsad (National Parliament) of Bangladesh. Since February 17, 2026, Bangladesh Jamaat-e-Islami central activist and former Bangladesh Islami Chhatra Shibir president Shafiqul Islam Masud has been member of parliament for this constituency.

== Boundaries ==
The constituency encompasses Bauphal Upazila.

== History ==
The constituency was created for the first general elections in newly independent Bangladesh, held in 1973.

Ahead of the 2008 general election, the Election Commission redrew constituency boundaries to reflect population changes revealed by the 2001 Bangladesh census. The 2008 redistricting altered the boundaries of the constituency.

Ahead of the 2014 general election, the Election Commission reduced the boundaries of the constituency by removing two union parishads of Patuakhali Sadar Upazila: Kamalapur and Lohalia.

== Members of Parliament ==
Election	Member	Party
1973	Shahjada Abdul Malek Khan	Awami League
1979	Siddiqur Rahman	Awami League
Major Boundary Changes
1986	ASM Feroz	Independent
1988	Md. Ruhul Amin	Jatiya Party
1991	ASM Feroz	BangladeshAwami League
Feb 1996	Prof. Dr. Yaqub Ali Sharif	Bangladesh Nationalist Party
Jun 1996	ASM Feroz	Bangladesh Awami League
2001	Shahidul Alam Talukder	Bangladesh Nationalist Party
2008	ASM Feroz	Bangladesh Awami League
2014	ASM Feroz	Bangladesh Awami League
2018	ASM Feroz	Bangladesh Awami League
2024	ASM Feroz	Bangladesh Awami League
2026	Dr. Shafiqul Islam Masud	Bangladesh Jamaat-e-Islami

== Elections ==
=== Elections in the 2020s ===
General Election 2026: Patuakhali-2
Party	Candidate	Votes	%	±%
Jamaat	Shafiqul Islam Masud	100,750	52.37	
BNP	Shahidul Alam Talukder	72,676	37.78	
IAB	Malek Hossein	14,418	7.49	N/A
Majority		28,074	14.59	
Turnout		192,350	61.01	
Jamaat gain from AL				

=== Elections in the 2010s ===
ASM Feroz was re-elected unopposed in the 2014 general election after opposition parties withdrew their candidacies in a boycott of the election.

=== Elections in the 2000s ===
General Election 2008: Patuakhali-2
Party	Candidate	Votes	%	±%
AL	ASM Feroz	98,303	54.8	+19.0
BNP	AKM Faruque Ahmed Talukder	58,258	32.5	−14.8
Independent	A.S.M. Firoz Alam	12,122	6.8	N/A
IAB	Abu Zafor Ahamdullah	10,287	5.7	N/A
BTF	Mohammad Rafiqul Islam	439	0.2	N/A
Majority		40,045	22.3	+15.4
Turnout		179,409	83.6	+18.5
AL gain from BNP				

General Election 2001: Patuakhali-2
Party	Candidate	Votes	%	±%
BNP	Md. Shahidul Alam Talukder	69,735	47.3	+0.9
AL	ASM Feroz	52,804	35.8	−10.6
IJOF	Faruque Talukder	24,720	16.8	N/A
CPB	Md. Shahabuddin Ahmmed	175	0.1	N/A
Independent	Md. Shah Alam Mridha	107	0.1	N/A
Majority		16,931	6.9	+6.9
Turnout		147,541	65.1	−4.3
BNP gain from AL				

=== Elections in the 1990s ===
General Election June 1996: Patuakhali-2
Party	Candidate	Votes	%	±%
AL	ASM Feroz	45,937	46.4	+1.0
BNP	Shahidul Alam Talukder	45,913	46.4	+38.4
IOJ	Akther Faruk	4,180	4.2	−4.5
Jamaat	Md. Fokruddin Khan Razi	1,680	1.7	−0.3
JP(E)	Md. Ruhul Amin	393	0.4	−1.6
FP	Shahadat Hossoin Khan	247	0.2	0.0
Zaker Party	Kazi Abdul Khaleq	208	0.2	N/A
Gano Forum	Begum Tahmina	204	0.2	N/A
Jatiya Samajtantrik Dal-JSD	Md. Moslem Uddin	145	0.1	N/A
Majority		24	0.0	−22.6
Turnout		98,907	69.4	+27.7
AL hold				

General Election 1991: Patuakhali-2
Party	Candidate	Votes	%	±%
AL	ASM Feroz	40,202	45.4	
Independent	Abu Zafar Khan	20,221	22.8	
IOJ	Akter Farooq	7,713	8.7	
NAP (Muzaffar)	Syed Ashraf Hossain	7,431	8.4	
BNP	Syed Ahmad Miah	7,050	8.0	
Bangladesh Janata Party	Kuddus Rahman	2,012	2.3	
Jamaat	Md. A. Gani	1,799	2.0	
JP(E)	Md. Ruhul Amin	1,743	2.0	
FP	Nurul Islam Miah	218	0.2	
Bangladesh Muslim League (Kader)	Miah Md. Lutfor Rahman Ansari	127	0.1	
Majority		19,981	22.6	
Turnout		88,516	41.7	
AL gain from JP(E)				
