= Jatiya Chhatra Samaj =

Student wing of Jatiya Party (Ershad)

Jatiya Chhatra Samaj জাতীয় ছাত্র সমাজ
- JCS Emblem
- President: Md. Al Mamun
- General Secretary: Md. Ashraful Islam Khan
- Founded: March 27, 1983; 42 years ago
- Headquarters: 66, Pioneer Road, Kakrail, Dhaka-1205
- Ideology: Conservatism (Bangladesh) Bangladeshi nationalism
- Position: Centre
- National affiliation: Jatiya Party (Ershad)
- Website: jcsbd.org

Flag

Jatiya Chhatra Samaj (Bengali: জাতীয় ছাত্র সমাজ, lit. 'National Student Society') (JCS) is the student wing of Jatiya Party (Ershad) (JPE). It was established in 1983.

== History ==
On 27 March 1983, Hussain Muhammad Ershad established a student organization named Natun Bangla Chhatra Samaj with then slogan as ''Put down your weapons and take up the pen - liberate the educational institutions'' and Rafiqul Haque Hafiz was appointed as then convener. Then the organization was known by the name of Jatiyo Chhatra Samaj after decisions by the Sajjad Hossain-Shajahan Saju Committee. However, politically it was still recognized as Sangrami Chhatra Samaj by some students. Committee of Adnan Akhter and Sarwar Hossain Titu then made decisions leading to the renaming of the organization to Jatiyo Chhatra Samaj. The renaming of Chhatra Samaj occurred in the 1980s and many Chhatra League and Chhatra Dal members had joined the group in its initial formation.

In February 1985, Chhatra Samaj engaged in clashes with Chhatra Sangram Parishad which ended up resulting in a few being killed.

In January 1988, opposition activists clashed with Jatiyo Chhatra Samaj in Chittagong, which ended up resulting in a few deaths.

In 1988, Jatiyo Chhatra Samaj was temporarily disbanded by Hussain Muhammad Ershad but the group began activities again in 1989.

In 1998, Jatiyo Chhatra Samaj played a role in humanitarian assistance during the 1998 Bangladesh floods and in the same year, Jatiyo Chhatra Samaj protested against increase in student fees of the University of Dhaka and also provided humanitarian assistance and other forms of assistance and help to children and teenagers nearby.

On 12 July 2004, violent clashes between Jatiyo Chhatra Samaj and Islami Chhatra Shibir resulted in 20 people being injured in Bhola.

In November 2015, a newly formed convening committee of Sylhet District branch of Chhatra Samaj was rejected.

In December 2019, a 251-member full committee of Chhatra Samaj was approved by GM Quader.

In April 2022, a partial committee of Dhaka University section of Chhatra Samaj was declared.

On 16 March 2023, a new 151-member full central committee of Jatiyo Chhatra Samaj was declared and approved.

In March 2023, the official website of Jatiyo Chhatra Samaj was launched.

In early July 2024, Chhatra Samaj and Jatiyo Party expressed support for the 2024 Bangladesh quota reform movement and condemned attacks and harassment on student protestors by Chhatra League and Awami League. GM Quader in July 2024 stated that the quota movement was legitimate and logical.

In October 2024, Jatiya Party and Chhatra Samaj protested and declared Hasnat Abdullah and Sarjis Alam as persona non grata in Rangpur, students then staged counter-demonstrations against Jatiya Party and Jatiyo Chhatra Samaj.

On 16 October 2024, the President of Jatiyo Chhatra Samaj, Md. Al-Mamun and the General Secretary, Ashraful Islam Khan resigned.

== Controversies ==
The Chhatra Samaj was accused of suppressing and violently clashing with anti-Ershad protestors during Ershad's rule from 1982 to 1990 and thus resulting in Chhatra Samaj being banned in a few educational establishments.
