= Bauphal Upazila =

Bauphal বাউফল
- Upazila
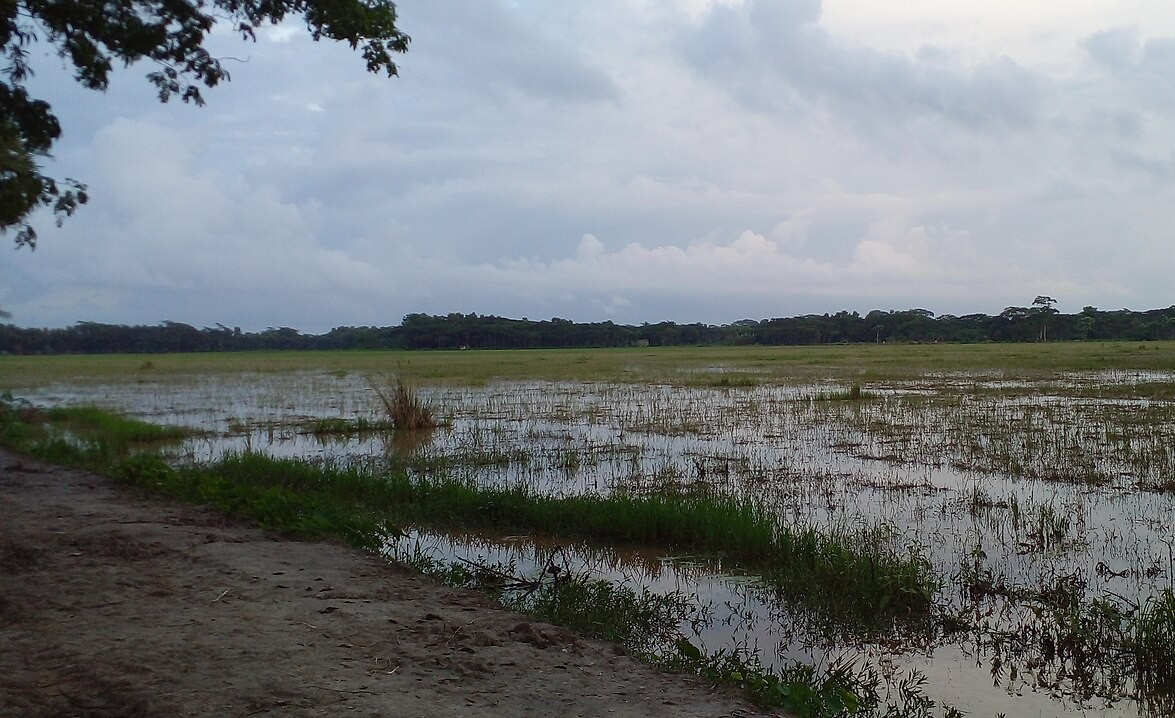
- Rural Crop Field in Kalaia, Bauphal upazila

- Coordinates: 22°25.8′N 90°30.8′E
- Country: Bangladesh
- Division: Barisal Division
- District: Patuakhali District
- Headquarters: Bauphal

Area
  - Total: 487.10 km^{2} (188.07 sq mi)

Population (2022)
  - Total: 327,498
  - Density: 672.34/km^{2} (1,741.4/sq mi)
- Time zone: UTC+6 (BST)
- Post code: 8620
- Area code: 04422
- Website: bauphal.patuakhali.gov.bd

Bauphal Upazila mauza geocode map

Bauphal Upazila (Bengali: বাউফল) is an upazila of Patuakhali District in the Division of Barisal, Bangladesh.

== Geography ==
The area of Bauphal is 487.10 km^{2} and it is located in between 22°19′ and 22°36′ north latitudes and in between 90°25′ and 90°40′ east longitudes. It is bordered by Bakerganj and Bhola Sadar Upazila on the north, Dashmina and Galachipa Upazila on the south, Bhola Sadar, Burhanuddin and Lalmohan Upazila on the east and Patuakhali Sadar and Bakerganj Upazila on the west.

Tentulia and Lohalia are the main rivers.

== Demographics ==
Religions in Bauphal Upazila (2022)
Religion	Percent
Islam	92.62%
Hinduism	7.38%
Other or not stated	0.00%

According to the 2022 Bangladeshi census, Bauphal Upazila had 80,130 households and a population of 327,498. 9.61% of the population were under 5 years of age. Bauphal had a literacy rate (age 7 and over) of 76.21%: 78.27% for males and 74.39% for females, and a sex ratio of 89.70 males for every 100 females. 35,405 (10.81%) lived in urban areas.

According to the 2011 Census of Bangladesh, Bauphal Upazila had 67,833 households and a population of 304,284. 73,523 (24.16%) were under 10 years of age. Bauphal has a literacy rate (age 7 and over) of 57.1%, compared to the national average of 51.8%, and a sex ratio of 1105 females per 1000 males. 16,916 (5.56%) lived in urban areas.

== Arts and culture ==
There have multicultural inhabitants and of different profession. Pottery is the most familiar industry of Bauphal, based on Kagujir Pool (a joint place of Paurashava and Madanpura Union).

== Administration ==
Bauphal Thana

Bauphal Thana was formed in 1874 and it was turned into an upazila in 1983.

Bauphal Upazilla Parishad

Bauphal Upazila is divided into Bauphal Municipality and 14 union parishads: Adabaria, Bauphal, Boga, Das Para, Dhulia, Kachipara, Kalaiya, Kalishuri, Kanakdia, Keshabpur, Madanpura, Najirpur, Nawmala, and Shurjamoni. The union parishads are subdivided into 134 mauzas and 140 villages.

Bauphal Municipality is subdivided into 9 wards and 10 mahallas.

== Educational institutes ==
There are a few educational institutions in Bauphal. Among them, 10 colleges, 1 polytechnic institute, 59 secondary schools, 122 primary schools, 72 madrasas.

== Notable people ==
- ASM Feroz, the Member of Parliament (MP) for constituency Patuakhali-6 from 1979 to 1982, and Patuakhali-2 from 1986 to 1987 and from 1991 until 2001, has been MP for Patuakhali-2 again since 2009.
- Shahidul Alam Talukder, Former Member of Parliament, Patuakhali-2.
- KM Nurul Huda, Chief Election Commissioner of Bangladesh.
- Abdul Malek, Information Commissioner of Bangladesh.
- Abdul Aziz Khandaker, former member of parliament (Patuakhali -6)
- Md. Ziaul Haque Jewel, acting Joint Secretary of Patuakhali Zila Awamileague and Former Mayor of Bauphal municipality
- Khandaker Shamsul Haq (Reza), Former General Secretary, Bangladesh Krishak League.
- Abdul Motaleb Haoladar, General Secretary, Bauphal Upozila Awami League. Former Upozila chairman, Bauphal Upozila Parishad. Former Chairman, Boga Union Parishad.
- Bishweshwar Pal, terracotta artist.
- Raunak Mahmud, civil servant.
- Manoranjan Sikder, politician and educator.
- AKM Faruque Ahmed Talukder, engineer, industrialist, politician and philanthropist.

== See also ==
- Upazilas of Bangladesh
- Districts of Bangladesh
- Divisions of Bangladesh
