= Adabaria, Patuakhali =

Adabaria, Patuakhali আদাবাড়িয়া
- Location in Bangladesh
- Coordinates: 22°23′N 90°28′E
- Country: Bangladesh
- Division: Barisal Division
- District: Patuakhali District
- Time zone: UTC+6 (Bangladesh Time)

Adabaria, Patuakhali (Bengali: আদাবাড়িয়া) is a village in Bauphal Upazila of Patuakhali District of southern-central Bangladesh.
