= Bauphal =

- Town
- Location of Bauphal in Barisal Division
- Coordinates: 22.419253°N 90.556514°E
- Country: Bangladesh
- Division: Barisal Division
- District: Patuakhali District
- Upazila: Bauphal Upazila
- Municipal town: 2001

Government
  - Type: Municipality
  - Body: Bauphal Municipality
  - Mayor: Md. Ziaul Haque

Area
  - Total: 10.82 km^{2} (4.18 sq mi)

Population
  - Total: 16,916
  - Density: 1,563/km^{2} (4,049/sq mi)
- Time zone: UTC+6 (BST)

Bauphal Municipality mahallah geocode map

Bauphal is a town in Patuakhali District under Barisal Division of Bangladesh. It is the headquarters of Bauphal Upazila. It is the fourth largest town of Patuakhali District and the largest as well as the main urban center of Bauphal Upazila. The nearest international and domestic airports to the town are Hazrat Shahjalal International Airport and Patuakhali Airport, respectively. The town is located 58.8 km from the divisional city Barisal and 37.6 km from the district headquarters Patuakhali.

== Demographics ==
The total population of Bauphal town is 16,916, of which 8,322 are male and 8,594 are female. The male-to-female ratio is 97:100. The town has 3,705 households in total.

== Geography ==
The geographical coordinates of Bauphal town are 22.419253°N 90.556514°E. Its average elevation above sea level is 6.62 meters.

== Administration ==
In 2001, to provide civic services and other facilities to the residents of Bauphal, a local government body named Bauphal Municipality was formed. It is divided into 9 wards and 10 mahallas. Out of the total 10.82 square kilometers of Bauphal town, 7.96 km^{2} are under the jurisdiction of Bauphal Municipality.

== Education ==
The literacy rate of Bauphal town is 69.8 percent.
