= Islamic Association of Greater Detroit =

Religious organization in Michigan

Coordinates: 42°38′6″N 83°8′57″W

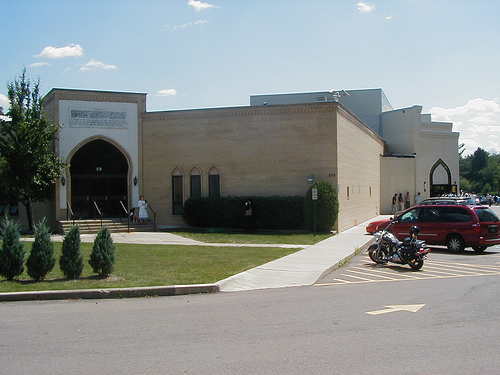

- Location in the USA

Religion
- Affiliation: Islam
- Year consecrated: 1978; 2001

Location
- Location: Rochester Hills, Michigan
- Interactive map of Islamic Association of Greater Detroit

Architecture
- Type: Islamic architecture
- Completed: 2001

Website
- www.iagd.net

Islamic Association of Greater Detroit (IAGD) was founded in 1978 by immigrants from South Asia and the Middle East. After IAGD was formed, it purchased the current property situated in the city of Avon Township. Eventually, the city name changed to Rochester Hills, Michigan. On this property was a "Blue House" which was used as a meeting place and Sunday Islamic School. As the community grew and during the construction of the original mosque, IAGD rented the Larson Middle School in Troy, Michigan for its Sunday School as well as community dinners. IAGD has had a tradition of holding a community dinner on the first Saturday of each month for the past 30 years. The original mosque included a prayer space, social hall, and kitchen. IAGD moved into the newly built facility in 1982.

== History ==
IAGD (Islamic Association of Greater Detroit) has been in the Rochester Hills community for over 40 years. Along with the mosque, IAGD has a Montessori school, Sunday Islamic school, and a gymnasium for sports activity. Regular events include five daily prayer services, a monthly community dinner, and an annual family fair event.

The structure of the masjid has gone through many phase of restructuring including a previous prayer hall and an adjacent social hall with kitchen. On November 10, 2001, IAGD opened the masjid with a significant expansion which included permanent classrooms for the Montessori and Sunday Islamic Schools, the gym, a larger social hall (rentable as Hall A, Hall B, or combined), and a large kitchen with restaurant type equipment. Plans in the next phase of building include expanding the sisters prayer area, a minaret and dome for the masjid.

IAGD has a Montessori school and daycare. The IAGD is also currently looking into the possibility of opening a full-time (K-12) Islamic school in the near future.

IAGD works with parents and the youth in an annual youth summer camp, Camp Al-Hilal, which has long received the backing and support of the United Way of Michigan. In its 28th year, it brings Muslim youth together from across the metro Detroit area and the surrounding states for a weeklong camp that includes outdoor activities and lectures/discussion sessions about Islam, five daily prayers, and more.

IAGD was also the home of the Michigan Muslim Basketball League, MMBL, a non-profit basketball league for 18+ men. During the season the games are held in the gymnasium every week, Saturday mornings.

The current Imam is Ahmed Abdur Rabb Rabbani (DB). Past Imams have been Muneer Fareed (currently Secretary General of ISNA), Achmat Salie, and Aly Lela.

== Visits by prominent scholars ==
The following notable scholars have visited IAGD in the past:

- Hamza Yusuf
- Abdur Raheem ibn Dawud Limboda (senior Professor of Darul Uloom Bury).
- Muhammad ibn Adam Al-Kawthari
- Zaid Shakir
- Siraj Wahaj
- Faraz Rabbani
- Abdur Rahman ibn Yusuf Mangera
- Tariq Jamil
- Saeed Palanpuri (current Principal of Darul Uloom Deoband).
