= Hanif Paribahan =

Bangladesh transportation company

- Founded: 1984
- Headquarters: Dhaka, Bangladesh
- Locale: Bangladesh
- Service area: Nationwide
- Service type: Intercity bus service
- Fleet: Hino Non AC/AC, Volvo AC
- Operator: Hanif Paribahan Ltd.

Hanif Paribahan, commonly known as Hanif Enterprise is a major intercity bus operator in Bangladesh, known for providing long-distance passenger transport across the country. The company offers services connecting major cities, including Dhaka, Rangpur, Cox’s Bazar, Chattogram, Sylhet, Khulna, and Rajshahi. Kafil Uddin is the owner of Hanif Paribahan.

== History ==
Hanif Paribahan was established in 1984 by Mohammed Hanif and Zoynul Abedin. It gained prominence for its relatively modern fleet and extensive network.

On 26 July 2018, the driver of a Hanif Paribahan bus confessed to the killing of Saidur Rahman Payel, a BBA student of North South University, following a similar confession by the bus supervisor a day earlier. According to the confession given under Section 164, Payel had exited the bus to relieve himself during a traffic jam near Bhaterchar on the Dhaka-Chittagong Highway, and was severely injured while attempting to reboard. The driver, along with the supervisor and helper, then threw the unconscious student into a canal from Bhaterchar Bridge at around 4:00 am, assuming he was dead. All three accused were arrested, and a murder case was filed at Gazaria Police Station.

On 14 October 2018, the Hanif Paribahan ticket counter in the Dampara area of Chattogram was vandalised by a group allegedly affiliated with the Bangladesh Chhatra League (BCL), the student wing of the ruling Awami League. Witnesses reported that approximately 30 individuals entered the counter, chanting political slogans, and damaging property. The attackers claimed the action was due to the company’s alleged connection to a convicted criminal. A banner left at the scene read: "Bir Chattolar matite khuni Hanif-er paribhan cholbena" ("Killer Hanif's buses won't operate in Chattogram"). Another Hanif Paribahan counter near the Shah Amanat Bridge was also closed by force on the same day. Local BCL leaders denied any organized involvement in the incident. In 2020, the Anti-Corruption Commission interrogated the owners of Hanif Paribahan including Kafil Uddin, younger brother of Hanif. In 2022, the transport sector called a strike after a driver of Hanif Paribahan was arrested over the death of 17 passengers in a road accident.

Mohammed Hanif was convicted and sentenced to death in connection with the 2004 Dhaka grenade attack case. He was accused of being involved in the planning of the attack. After the fall of the Sheikh Hasina led Awami League government, the case was dismissed by the High Court Division in December 2024, squashing his conviction. Following the fall, control of several transport sector offices—including those previously overseen by Awami League–affiliated leaders—reportedly passed to figures aligned with the Bangladesh Nationalist Party (BNP). Hanif Paribahan's owner, Kafil Uddin, a local BNP leader, was named as having taken over the Gabtoli terminal-based Bangladesh Bus-Truck Owners Association office, previously controlled by Shyamoli Paribahan officials. Though Kafil denied orchestrating a takeover, the transition occurred amid broader allegations of politically driven extortion within the transport sector, where Hanif Paribahan has operated as one of the key players. In November a bus of the company was stolen from Gaibandha Terminal.
