= Sayyid Syeed =

Former President and national director

Dr. Sayyid M. Syeed (born 1941, Kashmir) is the former President and former national director for the Office for Interfaith and Community Alliances for the Islamic Society of North America (ISNA), a national umbrella organization which has more than 300 affiliates across the United States and Canada.

== Life ==
A naturalized American citizen, Syeed obtained his Ph.D. in sociolinguistics from Indiana University at Bloomington, Indiana, in 1984. He was a board member of the Dar al-Hijrah mosque in Falls Church, Virginia, when it was founded in 1982.

As president of the Muslim Students Association of USA and Canada (1980–83), he oversaw its transformation into the Islamic Society of North America (ISNA). From 1984-88, he was secretary general of the International Islamic Federation of Student Organizations (IIFSO). He has also been general secretary of the Association of Muslim Social Scientists (AMSS), a national professional organization.

One of the founders of the quarterly American Journal of Islamic Social Sciences (AJISS), Syeed served as its editor-in-chief from 1984 to 1994. During his tenure AJISS switched from a twice a year to a quarterly publication, published simultaneously in Washington, D.C., Kuala Lumpur, Malaysia, Islamabad, Pakistan, and in Turkish from Istanbul, Turkey. Syeed is also a member of the board of advisory editors for the Middle East Affairs Journal, and a member of the board of advisors for the Council on American-Islamic Relations (CAIR). He was also chairman of the editorial board of Islamic Horizons, the flagship magazine of ISNA, from 1982-1984 and 1994-2006.

Syeed has participated in interfaith dialogues at different levels in the United States and Canada. A frequent speaker at interfaith dialogues, he has served as a member of the board of trustees of the Council for a Parliament of the Worlds Religions. In 2000, he was invited to a dialogue in the Vatican by Pope John Paul, and in 2008, he led the American Muslim leadership delegation to meet with Pope Benedict in Washington, DC.

Syeed was awarded an honorary doctorate of letters by the Graduate Theological Foundation, Donaldson, Indiana on May 4, 2001, in recognition of his contribution to inter-religious understanding and harmony. He received a Lifetime Achievement Award for distinguished service in furthering the Islamic tradition in North America and for promoting inter-religious understanding and harmony from the Cathedral Heritage Foundation, Louisville, Kentucky on November 18, 2001.

On January 5, 2002, Frank O'Bannon, the Governor of Indiana, in his State of the State Address, recognized Syeed's "work to educate Americans about the Muslim faith in the wake of the September 11 terror attacks, along with your life's work to encourage tolerance and racial healing has marked you as a great leader in Indiana".

Syeed has been a contributor speaking about Muslim and Islamic issues on the national TV channels, NBC, CBS, CBN, and ABC. He was interviewed on PBS on the MacNeil/Lehrer NewsHour, and appeared on the Today Show, CNN's Crossfire, and on the national television networks of Turkey, Malaysia, Sudan, Pakistan, and Saudi Arabia on matters related to Islam and Islam in America.

Syeed has led initiatives to promote understanding between the American Muslim community and American Jewish community. In 2007 he cosponsored the first National Summit of Imams and Rabbis, and also played a role in inviting the President of the Union for Reform Judaism (URJ) to address the annual convention of ISNA and coordinating a delegation from ISNA to address the annual convention of URJ. Other initiatives included bringing together 100 Muslim organizations and 100 Jewish organizations to hold annual joint events condemning Islamophobia and anti-Semitism.

Syeed also led an interfaith delegation to Israel and Palestine and was part of the first group of Muslim leaders to visit the Holocaust sites in Auschwitz and Dachau. He also addressed the First World Congress of Imams and Rabbis for Peace in Brussels in 2005 and the First National Summit of Imams and Rabbis in 2007 in New York City.
