= Manoranjan Sikder =

Pakistani provincial minister and enthusiast (1913–1976)

- Born: 1913; Backergunge District, Bengal Presidency, British India
- Died: 27 December 1976 (aged 62–63)
- Occupation: Teacher

Manoranjan Sikder was a former Health Minister of the provincial cabinet of Pakistan and an education enthusiast.

== Early life and education ==
He graduated with distinction from Barisal B.M. College in 1939 and earned his LL.B. degree from Barisal Law College in 1941. Manoranjan Sikder began his career as a teacher and served as an assistant teacher at Bauphal Adarsha Girls' High School, Bauphal High English School, and as the head teacher of Kalishuri High School.

== Politics ==
Manoranjan Sikder also contributed to politics and was a member of the Barisal District Council and the Minority Board. In 1945, he was elected as a member of the Provincial Assembly of East Pakistan. Later, he was appointed as the party whip. In 1956, he joined the provincial cabinet as the Health Minister. After his term as minister, he joined the Barisal District Court to practice law. He played a significant role in promoting education in the region. He established Bauphal Adarsha High School, Karpurkathi D.C.M.E. School, and Rajnagar Minor School. The school in Karpurkathi has since been upgraded to a secondary school. He was also known in the area as a playwright.

== Death ==
Sikder died on 27 December 1976.
