= Southeast Bank =

Private bank in Bangladesh

Southeast Bank PLC.
- Company type: Private Bank
- Industry: Banking, Financial services
- Founded: 1995; 30 years ago in Dhaka, Bangladesh
- Headquarters: Dhaka, Bangladesh
- Key people: Mr. M A Kashem, (Chairman); Mr. Abidur Rahman Chowdhury Managing Director (Current Charge)
- Services: Consumer banking Corporate banking Investment banking Islamic banking Mortgage loans Private banking Credit cards
- Revenue: $700 million (USD)(2018)
- Website: www.southeastbank.com.bd

Southeast Bank PLC. is a private commercial bank in Bangladesh. Mr M A Kashem is chairman of the bank and Mr. Abidur Rahman Chowdhury is the managing director(Current Charge) of the bank.

== History ==
Southeast Bank PLC. was established as a Public Limited Company on March 12, 1995. In the Registrar of Joint Stock Companies and Firms issued the Certificate of Commencement of Business of the Bank on the same date. The Southeast Bank received its Banking License from the Bangladesh Bank on March 23, 1995. The Bank's first branch was opened by M. Saifur Rahman, the then Finance Minister of Bangladesh as the chief guest at 1, Dilkusha Commercial Area, Dhaka on May 25, 1995. The founder chairman of the Bank is Mr. M. A. Kashem, Mr. Alamgir Kabir, FCA. a member of the Board and Yussuf Abdullah Harun were past Presidents of the Federation of Bangladesh Chamber of Commerce and Industries (FBCCI).

Neaz Ahmed was appointed managing director of the bank in 2004. He was reappointed in 2007.

In May 2009, Alamgir Kabir became chairman and Ragib Ali vice-chairman of the Bank. Mahbubul Alam was appointed managing director of the bank. Bangladesh Bank started monitoring Southeast Bank PLC. due to poor performance.

In December 2011, the bank started its 81st branch in Munshiganj.

Shahid Hossain was appointed managing director of the bank in 2013.

In 2016, 18.14% of SEBL's employees are women that will rise to 45% over the next five years.

In November 2021, Bangladesh Bank fined Southeast Bank PLC. one million taka for overinvesting in National Life Insurance Company Limited which violated banking rules. Bangladesh Bank fined them 2.1 million taka for failing to reduce their investment.

The appellate division of Bangladesh Supreme Court in August 2021 halted a Bangladesh High Court order for Anti-Corruption Commission and Bangladesh Bank to investigate against the chairman of the bank, Alamgir Kabir, on corruption charges following an appeal by Alamgir.

In September 2022, Chattogram Money Loan Court issued an arrest warrant against the chairman of Nurjahan group for embezzling 2.68 billion taka from Southeast Bank PLC.

== Banking ==
The Bank maintained a capital adequacy ratio at 11.46 percent as on December 31, 2011, against requirement of 10 percent set by Bangladesh Bank. Credit Rating Information and Services Limited (CRISL) rated the Bank AA− (Double A Minus) for the long term and ST-2 for the short term based on the financial statements of the Bank for the year 2010. Their rating for the long term remained valid up to June 1, 2012. The Credit Rating of the Bank for the year 2011 has been assigned to Credit Rating Information and services Limited (CRISL).

Southeast Bank Ltd. made operating profits worth Tk 5.50 billion in 2012 against Tk 6.05 billion in 2011.

== Board of directors ==
Name	Position	Reference
Mr. M A Kashem	Chairman	
Mrs. Rehana Rahman	Vice Chairperson	
Mr. Alamgir Kabir, FCA	Director	
Duluma Ahmed	Director	
Jusna Ara Kashem	Director	
M. Maniruz Zaman Khan	Director	
Nasir Uddin Ahmed	Director	
Md. Rafiqul Islam	Director	
Anjuman Ara Shahid	Director	
Syed Sajedul Karim	Independent Director	
Mohammad Delwar Husain	Independent Director	
Mr. Abidur Rahman Chowdhury	Managing Director(Current Charge)	

== Charity ==
Southeast Bank Foundation initiated a scholarship program for poor and meritorious student in 2009. The Foundation has, so far, distributed 827 scholarships to the secondary level students, while the number of scholarships to higher secondary level students stood at 1263. Since 2011, the program has been expanded to include graduation level students. On the occasion, scholarships were, for the first time, distributed to 75 students who are admitted at public universities, medical colleges, engineering universities and agricultural universities. In November 2022, the bank donated 75 thousand blankets to Prime Minister Sheikh Hasina's relief fund.

Southeast Bank PLC has distributed special CSR fund among farmers for cultivation and purchasing agro-based machinery.
