= Adabaria, Barguna =

Adabaria আদাবাড়িয়া
- Location in Bangladesh
- Coordinates: 22°13′N 90°11′E
- Country: Bangladesh
- Division: Barisal Division
- District: Barguna District
- Time zone: UTC+6 (Bangladesh Time)

Adabaria (Bengali: আদাবাড়িয়া) is a village in Barguna District in the Barisal Division of southern-central Bangladesh.

== See also ==
- List of villages in Bangladesh
