= International Islamic Federation of Student Organizations =

Islamic organization based in Istanbul, Turkey

IIFSO
- International Islamic Federation of Student Organizations الاتحاد الإسلامي العالمي للمنظمات الطلابية
- IIFSO
- Formation: February 1969
- Founder: Ahmed Totonji
- Founded at: Aachen, Germany
- Headquarters: Istanbul
- Location: Turkey
- Members: More than 100 Organization in 70 countries
- Official language: English and Arabic
- Secretary General: Dr. Mustafa Faisal Parvez (2023-)
- Website: https://iifso.org/

The International Islamic Federation of Student Organizations (IIFSO) is an international student and youth federation.

IIFSO's mission is to "serve, develop, integrate, and represent the Islamic student organizations worldwide while building bridges with other cultures in order to participate in building a brighter future for Muslim youth".

The IIFSO publishes and distributes large quantities of pocket editions of books on Islam. It published more than 1000 books in more than 100 languages to spread Islamic and humanitarian values and promote youth engagement. It also organized hundreds of capacity-building trainings to youth activists everywhere. IIFSO participated in several conferences on topics such as human rights, islamophobia, women rights, terrorism, social development, etc.

== Vision ==
Promote and protect the cause of human rights, justice and peace; coordinate activities of Muslim students' organizations world-wide; support the cause of Islamic brotherhood, cooperation, social justice and ultimate unity of world Muslim; promote the exchange of know how to ensure uniformity in methods and direction of work; glorify the word of Allah, disseminate information about the tenets of Islam and assist affiliated organizations in the fulfillment of their mission; promote a better understanding of Islam, removing misunderstandings and distortions and presenting the Islamic position on various aspects of life and development.

== Participating in United Nations ==
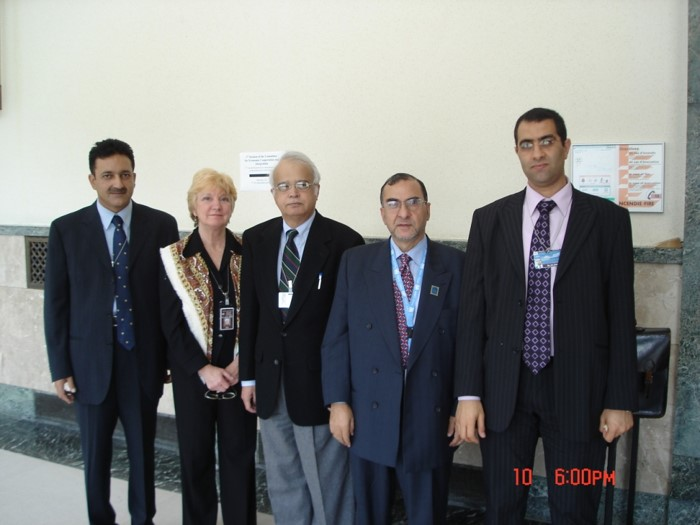
IIFSO delegation in UN meeting Geneve, with Miguel d'Escoto Brockmann

Since 1977, IIFSO joined the United Nations "as an NGO with a special consultative status" in the economic and social council and thus having mutual grounds in support of UN's initiatives such as its current millennium development goals (MDGs).

As an NGO at the UN, IIFSO was invited to international youth conferences held in Spain under aegis of UNESCO. This conference provided IIFSO a forum to put across the Islamic activities now taking roots there.

== Structure ==
General Assembly of delegates. Board of Trustees, consisting of 6 members and Secretary-General who is 7th ex official member. Executive Committee, composed of Secretary-General, Assistant Secretary-General, Financial Secretary and regional representatives (one from each continent).

== Publication ==
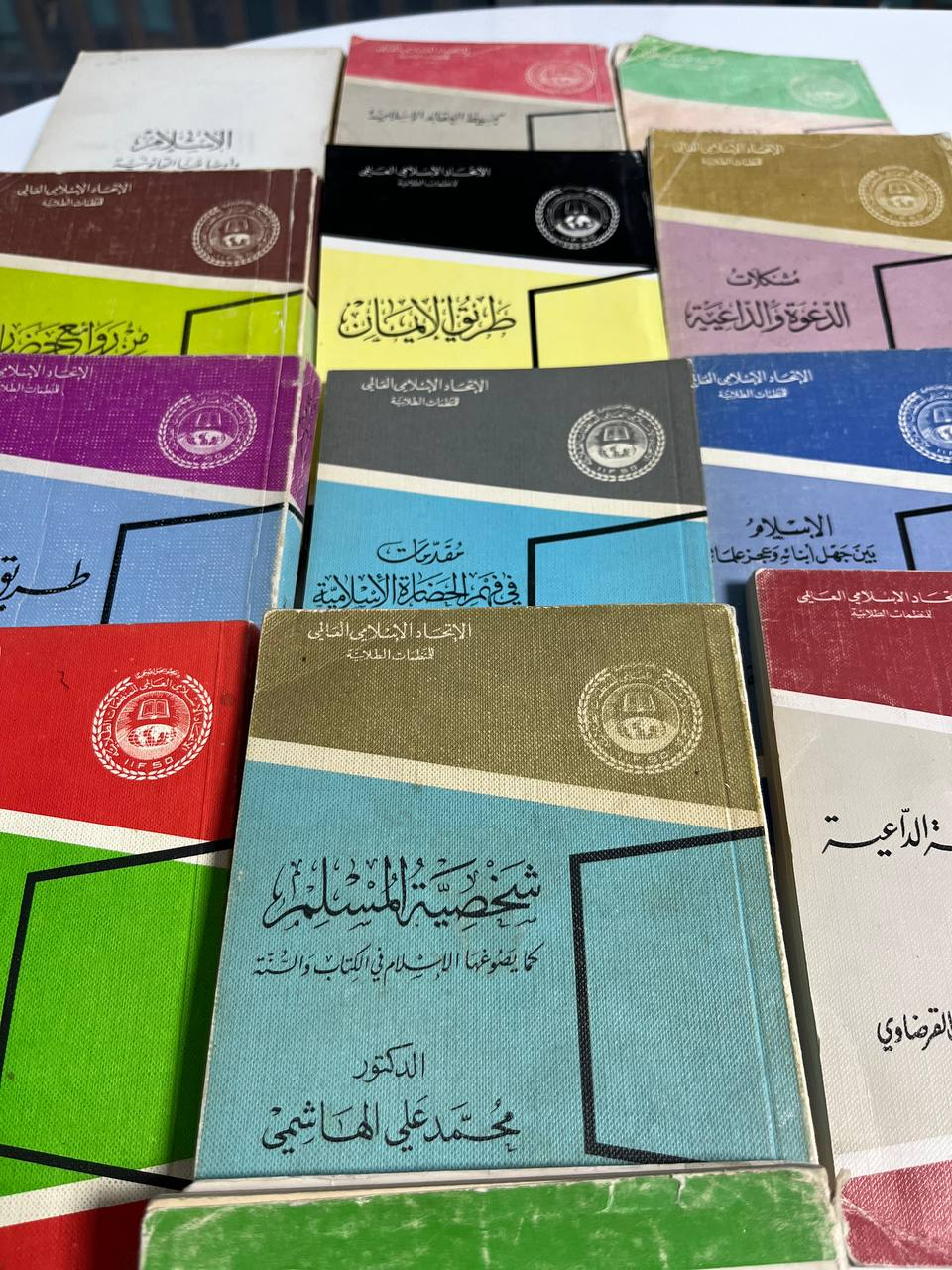

The IIFSO publishes and distributes large quantities of pocket editions of books on Islam. It published more than 1000 books in more than 100 languages to spread Islamic and humanitarian values and promote youth engagement. It also organized hundreds of capacity-building trainings to youth activists everywhere. IIFSO participated in several conferences in topics such as human rights, Islamophobia, women rights, terrorism, social development, etc.

== General Secretary of IIFSO ==
1. Dr. Ahmed Tutunji (1969-1973)
2. Dr. Hisham Altalib (1973-1977)
3. Dr. Emad Eldeen Abdulrahim (1977-1980)
4. Mustafa El-Tahhan (1980-1984)
5. Dr. Sayed Saeed (1984-1988)
6. Dr. Mustafa Osman Ismail (1988-1992)
7. Sayed Muhammed Abdullah Tahir (1992-1998)
8. Dr. Ömer Faruk Korkmaz ( 1998 - 2006)
9. Dr. Abo Bakir Abdulfattah (2006-2010)
10. Dr. Ahmed Abdulaty (2010-2014)
11. Dr. Khallad Swaied (2014-2019)
12. Dr. Enes Yalman (2019-2023)
13. Dr. Mostafa Faisal Parvez (2023-)
