= World Assembly of Muslim Youth =

Islamic organization based on Riyadh, Saudi Arabia

Coordinates: 24°44′18″N 46°39′28″E

World Assembly of Muslim Youth الندوة العالمية للشباب الإسلامي
- Abbreviation: WAMY
- Formation: 1972
- Headquarters: Riyadh
- Location: Saudi Arabia
- Chairman: Saleh Al ash-Sheikh
- Vice Chairman: Abdullah Omar Nasseef
- Secretary General: Dr. Saleh Suleman Al-Wohaibi
- Website: www.wamy.co.uk (English) www.wamy.org (Arabic)

The World Assembly of Muslim Youth (WAMY) is an international Islamic educational organization whose stated purpose is to "preserve the identity of Muslim youth and help overcome the problems they face in modern society". Reportedly the world's largest Muslim organization, WAMY organizes conferences, symposia, educational workshops and research circles to address youth and student issues, in addition to football tournaments and European Muslim Scouts camps for Muslim youth in Europe. Along with the Muslim World League, it is part of a "worldwide network of largely Saudi-funded groups... promoting Islamic teachings and encouraging Muslims to be more religiously observant, as well as providing interested non-Muslims and recent converts with information about Islam". It maintains satellite chapters in 31 other countries and is affiliated with some 196 other Muslim youth groups on five continents.

== History ==
WAMY was founded in Riyadh, Saudi Arabia in 1972 and has offices in countries with significant Muslim populations throughout the world. WAMY was co-founded by Muslim Brotherhood member Kamal Helwabi and Abdullah bin Laden, nephew of al-Qaeda founder Osama bin Laden. Abdullah bin Laden served as president through 2002, and was later treasurer. Abdullah also incorporated WAMY's U.S. branch in Falls Church, Virginia in 1992. Kamal Helwabi went on to serve as WAMY's executive director until 1982.

According to the Pew Research Center, between the 1970s and 1990s, the activities of the Muslim Brotherhood, the Muslim World League and the World Assembly of Muslim Youth in Europe became "so intertwined that it was often difficult to tell them apart". It further notes that the influence of WAMY and the Muslim World League has waned somewhat as social media and blogs have "made it easier for other groups to reach wide audiences". Books favored by the organization during the 1980s–90s included works by Islamist authors Sayyid Qutb, Abul A'la Maududi, and Muhammad Qutb.

== Aims ==
WAMY's South African branch aims "to preserve the Muslim identity, to help overcome the problems Muslim youth face in modern society", and to "educate and train Muslim youth in order for them to become active and positive citizens in their countries". WAMY aims to introduce Islam to non-Muslims in its "purest form as a comprehensive system and way of life" and "to establish a relationship of dialogue, understanding and appreciation between other faith organizations".

WAMY organizes conferences, symposia, workshops and research circles to address youth and students issues. It also publishes material that introduces Islam to non-Muslims. WAMY organizes exchange visits, Hajj and Umrah trips and provide training and support to Muslim youth organizations.

The website of WAMY's UK branch states its aim is to "build bridges of peace and unity in our multicultural society. ...Through educating the Muslim youth to the common good and promoting understanding among people of different communities".

Both the Muslim World League and WAMY are widely seen to be promoting the strict Wahhabi interpretation of Islam prevalent in Saudi Arabia, due to Saudi funding and influence on it.

== Controversy ==
An affidavit signed by Customs Senior Special Agent David C. Kane stated that a WAMY publication lists people who have attacked Israelis, including a man who killed 14 people by driving a bus off a cliff, as "Heroes from Palestine". Kane writes that a section of that publication, titled "Animosity Toward the Jews", lists reasons for Muslims to hate Jews, including, "The Jews are humanity's enemies: they foment immorality in this world."

In May 2004, 50 FBI, U.S. Immigration and Customs Enforcement, and Joint Terrorism Task Force agents raided WAMY's office in Alexandria, Virginia. WAMY issued a statement saying that all of its computers and hard drives were seized in the raid, and a volunteer board member, Ibrahim Abdullah, was arrested on immigration charges. In a statement, WAMY strongly denied any terrorist ties and said the government had told them the probe is focused only on "immigration issues". The branch was closed by the U.S. government.

The Albanian WAMY branch, founded in 1993, was raided in 1999 and suspected terrorist elements were deported. Saudi support for the new leadership continued after the event. Founded with the aim of constructing mosques and providing humanitarian aid, the branch was active in bringing Salafi and Wahabi ideology to Albania, recruiting and sending Albanians to study Salafi and Wahabi theology in Saudi Arabia.

The Indian government has accused the assistant general secretary of WAMY, Nazir Qureshi, of supporting terrorist groups in Kashmir. The Peshawar branch of WAMY was also raided in a joint operation by the FBI and Pakistani intelligence.
