= Shahidul Alam Talukder =

Bangladeshi politician

Member of Bangladesh Parliament

Personal details
- Party: Bangladesh Nationalist Party

Shahidul Alam Talukder (Bengali: শহিদুল আলম তালুকদার) is a Bangladesh Nationalist Party politician and a former member of parliament for Patuakhali-2.

== Career ==
Talukder was elected to parliament from Patuakhali-2 as a Bangladesh Nationalist Party candidate in 2001. In 2005, cadres led by him assaulted Monjur Morshed, correspondent of Jugantor, for reporting on the theft of hilsa by Bangladesh Nationalist Party men. Most of the journalists in Bauphal Upazila fled to their homes after facing intimidation from Bangladesh Police and Bangladesh Nationalist Party men. In 2006, he beat up a student of Baufal Degree College, a college owned by him, for refusing to pay an extra fee for examination.

Talukder was sentenced to nine years in jail for hiding information in his wealth statement on a case filled by Anti-Corruption Commission.
