= A. S. M. Feroz =

Bangladeshi politician

- আ. স. ম. ফিরোজ
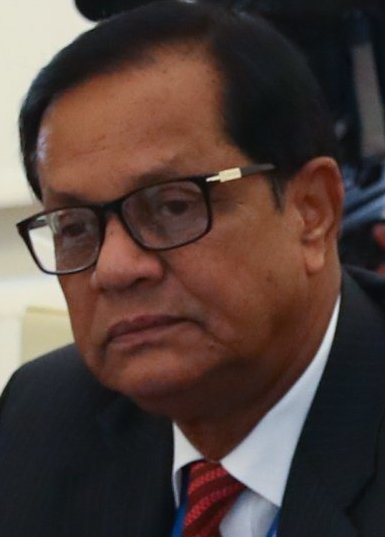
- Feroz in 2017

10th Chief Whip of Parliament
- In office 29 January 2014 – 28 January 2019
- Speaker: Shirin Sharmin Chaudhury
- Preceded by: Md. Abdus Shahid
- Succeeded by: Noor-E-Alam Chowdhury Liton

Member of the Bangladesh Parliament for Patuakhali-2
- In office 25 January 2009 – 6 August 2024
- Preceded by: Shahidul Alam Talukder

Personal details
- Born: 1 February 1952 (age 74)
- Party: Bangladesh Awami League
- Education: Brojomohun College

A. S. M. Feroz is a Bangladesh Awami League politician, and a former Jatiya Sangsad member representing the Patuakhali-2 constituency and former chief whip of the Bangladeshi parliament.

== Early life ==
Feroz was born on 1 February 1952. He has a M.A. degree in history from Brojomohun College. He is a veteran of the Bangladesh Liberation War.

== Career ==
Feroz was first elected to parliament in 1979 during the tenure of president and military chief Ziaur Rahman. He joined the Bangladesh Awami League in 1986. He was elected to parliament in 1986 as an independent candidate. He was elected to parliament from Patuakhali-2 in 1991, 1996, 2008 and 2014 as a candidate of the Bangladesh Awami League. He served in the 9th Jatiya Sangsad as the whip and was appointed the chief whip in the 10th Jatiya Sangsad. He was elected again in 2018 and 2024 general election. In total he has been elected 8 times as a member of Parliament

Feroz owns M/S Patuakhali Jute Mills which has 260 million taka in outstanding loans from Sonali Bank. The bank rescheduled the loan so that he could stand for elections in 2018. He was re-elected from Patuakhali-2 with 185,783 votes while his nearest rival, Salma Alam of Bangladesh Nationalist Party, received 5,660 votes.

In February 2021, 10 people were injured in clashes between supporters of Feroz and Ziaul Haque Jewel, Mayor of Bauphal Municipality.

Feroz was detained from Banani in August 2024 after the fall of the Awami League led government.
