= List of massacres in Bangladesh =

The following is a list of massacres that have occurred in Bangladesh (numbers may be approximate):

Name	Date	Location	Deaths	Notes
Salanga massacre	27 January 1922	Salanga, Ullahpara, Sirajganj District	4,500	
1966 protests	7 June 1966	Dhaka, Narayanganj and Tongi	11	
1971 Bangladesh genocide	starting 25 March 1971 – 16 December 1971	Various places in Bangladesh	300,000–3,000,000	
1971 Dhaka University massacre	25 March 1971	University of Dhaka	310+	
1971 killing of Bengali intellectuals	25 March-14 December 1971		1,111	
1971 Khulna jute mill massacres	25-28 March 1971	Crescent Jute Mills, Khulna	600–1,000	
Shankharipara massacre	26 March 1971	Shankaripara, Dhaka	estimated 8,000	
Ramna massacre	27 March 1971	Ramna Kali Temple, Ramna, Dhaka	250	
Sutrapur massacre	27 March 1971	Sutrapur, Dhaka	15	
Santahar massacre	27 March - 17 April 1971	Santahar, Bogra District	1000+	
Jinjira massacre	1 April 1971	across the Buriganga River from Dhaka	1000+	
Akhira massacre	17 April 1971	Baraihat, Dinajpur	93–125	
Jathibhanga massacre	21 April 1971	Jathibhanga, Thakurgaon	3,000-3,500	
Sree Angan massacre	23 April 1971	Sree Angan, Faridpur	8	Massacre of 8 Bengali Hindu sanyasis of Sri Angan monastery by the occupying Pakistani army
Karai Kadipur massacre	26 April 1971	Karai Kadipur, Joypurhat	370	
Kaliganj massacre	27 April 1971	Kaliganj, Rangpur	400	
Ishangopalpur massacre	2 May 1971	Ishangopalpur, Faridpur	28	
Muzaffarabad massacre	3 May 1971	Patiya, Chittagong	more than 300	
Naria massacre	5 May 1971	Naria, Sylhet	28	
Gopalpur massacre	5 May 1971	Lalpur Upazila, Natore	195	
Demra massacre	13 May 1971	Demra, Pabna District	more than 900	
Satanikhil massacre	14 May 1971	Kewar, Dhaka district	14	
Baria massacre	14 May 1971	Baria, Dhaka district	200	
Ketnar Bil massacre	15 May 1971	Ketnar Bil, Barisal	more than 500	
Char Bhadrasan massacre	May 1971	Char Bhadrasan, Faridpur	50–60	
Hasamdia massacre	16 May 1971	Boalmari, Faridpur	33	
Sendia massacre	20 May 1971	Sendia, Faridpur	127	
Chuknagar massacre	20 May 1971	Khulna	8,000-10,000	
Galimpur massacre	20 May 1971	Galimpur, Sylhet	33	
Dakra massacre	21 May 1971	Dakra, Khulna	more than 2,000	
Madhyapara massacre	22 May 1971	Palong, Faridpur	370	
Bhimnali massacre	22 May 1971	Bhimnali, Barisal	15	
Bakhrabad massacre	24 May 1971	Bakhrabad, Comilla	142	
Burunga massacre	26 May 1971	Burunga, Sylhet	71–94	
Bagbati massacre	27 May 1971	Bagbati, Pabna	more than 200	
Barguna massacre	29–30 May 1971	Barguna sub-divisional jail, Patuakhali	more than 100	
Daldalia massacre	2 June 1971	Daldalia, Rangpur	20	Murder 20 of unarmed Bengali Hindus by the Pakistan Army and Bihari Muslims
Golaghat massacre	13 June 1971	Golaghat, Nilphamari	437	
Adityapur massacre	14 June 1971	Adiyapur, Sylhet	63	
Makalkandi massacre	18 August 1971	Habiganj, Sylhet	more than 100	
Pomara massacre	14 September 1971	Pomara, Chittagong	13	
Krishnapur massacre	18 September 1971	Krishnapur, Sylhet	127	
Suryamani massacre	7 October 1971	Suryamani, Barisal	24	
Shankharikathi massacre	4 November 1971	Shankharikathi, Khulna	42	
1972 Khulna massacres	March 1972	Khulna	1,000–25,000	
1974 Ramna massacre	17 March 1974	Ramna, Dhaka	40–50	Massacre of Jatiya Samajtantrik Dal (JASAD) supporters by members of Jatiya Rakkhi Bahini
15 August 1975 Bangladeshi coup d'état	15 August 1975	Dhaka	47+	Mass murder during the Assassination of Sheikh Mujibur Rahman, the then president
1977 Bangladesh mass executions	9 October – November 1977	Bangladesh	1,143–2,000+	The government of Ziaur Rahman carried out mass executions of military personnel, following a series of attempted coups in Bangladesh.According to official records, 1,143 members of the Bangladesh armed forces were hanged in two months
Bhushanchhara massacre	31 May 1984	Bhushanchhara, Barkal Upazila, Rangamati	400	Massacre of Bengali settlers by the Shanti Bahini, the armed wing of the Parbatya Chattagram Jana Samhati Samiti
1988 Chittagong massacre	24 January 1988	Laal Dighi, Chittagong	370	
Logang massacre	10 April 1992	Logang village, Khagrachari District	Unknown	
1999 Jessore bombings	6 March 1999	Jessore	10	
1999 Khulna mosque bombing	8 October 1999	Khulna	8	
2000 Chittagong massacre	14 July 2000	Chittagong	8	
2001 Ramna Batamul bombings	14 April 2001	Ramna Park in Dhaka	9	
2001 Gopalganj Roman Catholic church bombing	1 June 2001	Roman Catholic church in Gopalganj	10	
Mymensingh cinema bombings	6 December 2002	Mymensingh	27	
2003 Tangail shrine bombing	17 January 2003	Tangail	7	Two bombs exploded in Fair, 20 wounded
Banshkhali carnage	18 November 2003	Sheelpara, Sadhonpur village, Banshkhali Upazila, Chittagong District	11	Some individuals set fire to the house of Tejendra Lal Sheel using gunpowder killing 11 members of family including six children
2004 Dhaka grenade attack	21 August 2004	Bangabandhu Avenue, Dhaka	24	13 grenades were thrown into a crowd at an anti-terrorism rally organized by the Awami League.
2005 November Bangladesh court bombing	29 November 2005	Gazipur and Chittagong	8	Series of simultaneous suicide bombing of courts in Chittagong and Gazipur is carried out by Jamaat-ul-Mujahideen Bangladesh, killed 8 people and injured over 100
2005 Netrokona bombing	8 December 2005	Netrokona	8	A suicide bombing in Netrokona results in the deaths of eight people
2006 Fulbari movement	26 August 2006	Fulbari Upazila	6	Killings of protesters during non-violent movement opposing open pit mining, carried out by Bangladesh Rifles
Bangladesh Rifles revolt	25 February — 2 March 2009	Pilkhana, Dhaka	74	Soldiers of border security force Bangladesh Rifles (BDR) mutiny and take the commanding army officers and their families hostages at the force's headquarters in Pilkhana, Dhaka. 57 army officers are killed along with 17 civilians by the mutineers
Chauddagram bus bombing	3 February 2015	Chauddagram town, Cumilla	7	Anti-government protesters firebomb a bus full of sleeping passengers, leaving seven people dead
Shapla Square massacre	5 – 6 May 2013	Shapla Square, Dhaka	93 (opposition claims); 10-12 (government claims); 50-60 (neutral claims)	Government crackdown on a protest organized by Hefazat-e-Islam Bangladesh with the goal of enacting a blasphemy law.
2016 Dhaka attack	1 June 2016	Holey Artisan Bakery, Gulshan Thana, Dhaka	29	5 gunmen attacked a restaurant popular with foreigners in the wealthy Gulshan Thana area
2017 South Surma Upazila bombings	25 March 2017	South Surma Upazila, Sylhet	11 (including 4 suicide bombers)	A suicide bombing killed four civilians, two police officers and wounded around 40 during a security forces raid on a suspected terrorist hideout in South Surma Upazila. ISIL claimed responsibility. Four militants were also killed
July massacre	16 July – 5 August 2024	Nationwide	1400	Mass killings of protesters during quota protests and non-cooperation movement from July 16 to August 5, 2024, carried out by various law enforcement agencies under Hasina administration and affaialed groups of Bangladesh Awami League such as the Chhatra League
Chankharpul massacre	5 August 2024	Chankharpul, Dhaka	7	Mass killings of protesters during quota protests and non-cooperation movement from July 16 to August 5, 2024, carried out by various law enforcement agencies under Hasina administration and affaialed groups of Bangladesh Awami League such as the Chhatra League
Ashulia immolation killings	5 August 2024	Ashulia, Savar, Dhaka	6	Mass killings of protesters during quota protests and non-cooperation movement from July 16 to August 5, 2024, carried out by various law enforcement agencies under Hasina administration and affaialed groups of Bangladesh Awami League such as the Chhatra League
2025 Gopalganj clashes	16 July 2025	Gopalganj, Bangladesh	5	Killings of protesters opposing a rally of the National Citizen Party in the city, carried out by various law enforcement agencies under Yunus administration

== Perpetrators and impact ==
During the Bangladesh genocide in Bangladesh Liberation War, the Pakistani Military and several militia organizations created by the Pakistani military violated Geneva Conventions of War by participating in numerous massacres of civilians, committed genocide of between 300,000 and 3 million civilians, operated concentration camps, and used rape as weapon of war against Bengali Muslims, Hindus and Buddhists minorities. Active collaborators of Pakistan Military in perpetratuation of genocide and ethnic cleansing in Bangladesh include the Al Badr, Al Sham, East Pakistan Central Peace Committee, Razakars, Muslim League, Jamaat-e-Islami, and the Urdu-speaking Biharis.

The impact is drastic. Since 1951, Hindu population decreased by 15.1% in 71 years, and during the same period Muslim population increased by exactly by the same 15.1% (76% to 91.1%). Percentage of Hindus declined more than two third (over 67% drop) in 71 years, i.e. from 22% of total population of Bangladesh in 1951 to 13.5% in 1974 (8.5% decrease in 20 years), and then drop again to 6.9% in 2022 (further 1.6% decrease).

== See also ==
- Bangladesh genocide (1971)
  - Bangladesh Genocide Remembrance Day
  - Al Badr, perpetrator
  - Al Sham, perpetrator
  - East Pakistan Central Peace Committee, perpetrator
  - Razakars, perpetrator
  - 'Muslim League, perpetrator
  - Jamaat-e-Islami, perpetrator
  - Urdu-speaking Biharis of East Pakistan, perpetrators
- Human rights in Bangladesh
  - Persecution of Biharis in Bangladesh
  - Persecution of Buddhists in Bangladesh
  - Persecution of Hindus in Bangladesh
  - Persecution of Christians in Bangladesh
  - Persecution of atheists and secularists in Bangladesh
