= Bakchar massacre =

Bakchar massacre বকচর গণহত্যা
- Location: Bakchar, Faridpur district, Bangladesh
- Date: 13 May 1971 (UTC+6:00)
- Target: Bengali Hindus
- Weapon: Firearms
- Deaths: 9
- Perpetrators: Razakars, Peace Committee

Bakchar massacre (Bengali: বকচর গণহত্যা) refers to the massacre of nine unarmed Bengali Hindu residents by the Razakars on the instructions of Ali Ahsan Mohammad Mojaheed in the village of Bakchar in Faridpur district on 13 May 1971. On 17 July 2013 the International Crimes Tribunal found Mojaheed responsible for the killings and sentenced him for life. In 2015, a four-judge bench of the Appellate Division of the Supreme Court reduced the death sentence to life imprisonment.

== Background ==
The village of Bakchar fell under Faridpur Kotwali police station in 1971. It is currently a part of Majchar Union of Faridpur Sadar Upazila in Faridpur District. On 21 April 1971, the Pakistan Army arrived in Faridpur. They began killing the Hindu population with the help from local collaborators. The decision to attack Bakchar village was taken at a Peace Committee meeting.

== Killings ==
On 13 May, the Razakar forces attacked the Hindu inhabited portion of the Bakchar village. They arrested nine Hindus namely Birendra Saha, Nripen Saha, Shanu Saha, Jagabandhu Mitra, Jaladhar Mitra, Satya Ranjan Das, Niradbandhu Mitra, Prafulla Mitra and Upen Saha. The latter's wife wanted to free her husband by paying cash and gold to the Razakars but her efforts went in vain. The Razakars massacred all the nine arrested Hindus. The Razakars also raped Jhuma Rani Saha, the daughter of Sunil Kumar Saha and killed her. They forced Anil Saha to leave the country.

== Aftermath ==
Chitta Saha, a resident of Bakchar and witness to the massacre provided testimony at the tribunal during the prosecution of Mojaheed. When the Supreme Court reduced the verdict from death penalty to life imprisonment, the victims and the residents of Bakchar village were unhappy with it.

== See also ==
- Char Bhadrasan massacre
- Hasamdia massacre
- Ishangopalpur massacre
- Sree Angan massacre
