= Jogisho and Palsha massacre =

Massacre of Bengali Hindus

Jogisho and Palsha massacre যুগীশো ও পালশা গণহত্যা
- Part of 1971 Bangladesh genocide
- Location: 24.5984°N 88.5340°E; Jogisho and Palsha villages, Durgapur Upazila, Rajshahi division, Bangladesh
- Date: 16 May 1971
- Target: Bengali Hindus
- Attack type: Burst fire, Mass murder
- Weapons: Machine gun, Bayonets
- Deaths: 42
- Perpetrators: Pakistani Army, Razakars

The Jogisho and Palsha massacre (Bengali: যুগীশো ও পালশা গণহত্যা) was a massacre of 42 Bengali Hindus in the villages of Jogisho and Palsha, Durgapur Upazila of Rajshahi Division in East Pakistan on 16 May 1971 by the occupying Pakistan Army in collaboration with the Razakars during the Bangladesh Liberation War. According to sources, 42 Bengali Hindus were killed by the Pakistani forces and the Razakars.

== Background ==
The villages of Jogisho and Palsha fall under Deluabari Union of Durgapur upazila of Rajshahi District in western Bangladesh. Both the villages had a substantial Bengali Hindu population. In 1962, during the attacks on Hindus in Darusa village under neighbouring Paba police station, five or six Hindu households were also attacked in Jogisho village. Following the attacks, a peace committee including both Hindus and Muslims was formed to prevent attacks on the Hindus.

== Events ==
In the early morning of 16 May 1971, six Pakistan Army vans arrived at Jogisho village, along with Razakars from neighbouring villages. On the arrival of the soldiers, the Hindus of Jogisho took cover in the dense vegetation nearby. Led by a postmaster of the village, Abdul Qader, the Razakars lured out the Hindu villagers of Jogisho and Palsha from their hiding spots. They then brought all the hostages to the Jogisho Primary School, and separated the Hindus from the Muslims.

The soldiers then took the 42 Hindus away to a nearby remote hut and then hit them with their gunstocks, later killing them with their machine guns. Those who survived the bullets and moved a little were stabbed with bayonets. The soldiers and the razakars then took the remains of the bodies and buried them in a nearby pond with soil. On their way out, they also looted their empty houses and took away their valuables.

M. A. Hassan, in his book Yuddha O Nari (literally 'War & Women'), has captured the testimonies of widows of Jogisho village, along with others. Many widows whose names were mentioned in the book had testified about how their husbands, their elder children, etc., were taken away by the Razakars on the pretext of a "peace committee meeting" and then handed them over to the Pakistan Army. Those who could escape from this trap had hidden themselves in nearby jungles till night fell, and then took all their valuables and migrated to India. Today, some of the widows are still alive in the Jogisho and Palsha villages.

== Aftermath ==
In 1996, the Rajshahi Zila Parishad acquired around five decimals of land around the Jogisho mass grave for its maintenance and protection. The area was enclosed with a one-and-a-half-foot-high low brick wall, and a plaque containing the names of the victims was erected. Later, the Rajshahi Zila Parishad erected a memorial inside the enclosure, which displayed the names of the victims. Some of the remains of the victims were recovered in 2006, which yet remains to be identified and handed over to their families for their last rites. According to some reports, the widows have not been receiving their pensions from the government.

The land acquired for the protection of the Jogisho mass grave is adjacent to a piece of land owned by local Awami League leader Rustam Ali. In 2008, after being elected the vice president of Naopara Union Awami League, he forcibly occupied the land and destroyed the commemorative plaque at the mass grave. He erected a khanqah sharif over the mass grave in the memory of Tayyab Ali of Natore and named it Shah Sufi Hazarat Tayyab Ali Khanqah Sharif. At the khanqah sharif, a religious gathering is held every Thursday night where the followers smoke ganja. After the local Bengali Hindus protested the misappropriation of the mass grave, Rustam Ali erected the commemorative plaque on the wall of the khanqah sharif building.

== See also ==
- Bagbati massacre
- Demra massacre
- Karai Kadipur massacre
- Gopalpur massacre
