= Jandi massacre =

1971 killings of Bengali Hindus

Jandi massacre জান্দী গণহত্যা/জানদী গণহত্যা
- Part of 1971 Bangladesh genocide
- Location: 23.4002°N 89.9778°E; Jandi village, Tujarpur Union, Bhanga Upazila, Faridpur district, Dhaka division, Bangladesh
- Date: May 2, 1971
- Target: Bengali Hindus
- Attack type: Burst fire, Mass murder
- Weapons: Machine gun, bayonets
- Deaths: 31
- Perpetrators: Pakistan Army, Razakar (Pakistan)

Jandi massacre (Bengali: জান্দী গণহত্যা, or জানদী গণহত্যা) was a premediated massacre of 31 Bengali Hindus in the Jandi village of Tujarpur Union under Bhanga Upazila of Faridpur District of East Pakistan on May 2, 1971 by the occupying Pakistan Army in collaboration with the Razakars during the Bangladesh Liberation War. According to sources, 31 Bengali Hindus were killed by the Pakistani forces and the Razakars.

== Events ==
After the forces of the Pakistan Army entered Faridpur on April 21 and carried out the Sree Angan massacre, news of this spread all across Faridpur, shocking the Hindus there. Immediately the Hindus left Faridpur town and migrated to safe houses in the Faridpur district for safety. One amongst them was a Hindu businessman Tonic Sen, who left Faridpur along with his family to a relative's home in Jandi village for shelter. Tonic Sen was a sympathiser of the Awami League and has helped the Muktijoddhas through fuel and ammunition during the Bangladesh Liberation War. The Forces and Razakars, in the search for Awami League sympathisers, were trying to trace Tonic Sen.

On May 2, 1971, Pakistan Forces along with the Razakars reached Jandi village and surrounded the village to prevent anyone from escaping. They then rounded up all the Hindus in the village, and then the men were killed with burst fire from machine guns while the women were raped and killed.

== Aftermath ==
Every year, residents of Jandi village along with Ishangopalpur village organise a commemorative function to remember the people who lost their lives in the hands of the forces and Razakars.

== See also ==
- Sree Angan massacre
- Ishangopalpur massacre
