= Naria massacre =

1971 massacre in East Pakistan

Coordinates: 24.48°N 91.67°E

Naria massacre নড়িয়া গণহত্যা
- Part of Bangladesh genocide
- Location: Naria, Sylhet, East Pakistan
- Date: 5 May 1971 (UTC+6:00)
- Target: Bengali Hindus
- Attack type: Massacre
- Weapon: Rifles
- Deaths: 28
- Perpetrators: Pakistani Army, Razakars, Al Badr, Peace Committee

Naria massacre (Bengali: নড়িয়া গণহত্যা) refers to the massacre of 28 Bengali Hindus of Naria village in the district of Sylhet in East Pakistan on 5 May 1971 by the Pakistani occupation army.

== Background ==
The village of Naria is situated in Upper Kagabala Union, in the western end of Maulvibazar Sadar Upazila, 10 km to the west of Maulvibazar, the district headquarters of Maulvibazar District. In 1971, the Maulvibazar District was a sub-division of Sylhet District. The village is surrounded by numerous haors, which makes the village inaccessible during the rains. Country boats remain the sole form of transport to and from the village during the rains. In 1971, the village was inhabited mostly by poor and backward Hindus who made their livelihood through menial labour.

On 26 March, the Pakistani occupation army launched the Operation Searchlight and targeted the Hindus for extermination. Thousands of Hindus were killed in the months of March and April and hundreds of thousands of Hindus had taken refuge in India. During this time the local Razakars led by one Madrichh Ali proposed to the villagers of Naria, that they convert en masse and then marry their girls with Muslim boys. The village would thus be saved from the attack of Pakistani occupation army. When the villagers refused, the Razakars asked them to hand over all their cows, to which the villagers refused again. At that, the Razakars threatened them to teach a lesson.

== Events ==
On 5 May, 12 Pakistani soldiers from the Sherpur camp arrived at the village on foot, via the nearby Sadhuhati village. They were accompanied by the President of the Peace Committee of Maulvibazar. Some of the villagers already taken refuge in the nearby Farchha Beel and the others started running for their life, when the Pakistani soldiers arrived in the village. The local collaborators of the Pakistani occupation army, belonging to the Razakars and the Al Badr prevented the villagers from escaping. More than a hundred men, women and children were caught and then brought to the house of Kamini Kumar Deb, a Hindu resident of the village. The women and children were separated from the men and confined to a room. The men, including Kamini Kumar Deb himself, were made to stand in a line and killed by burst fire. After killing the men, the women were raped by the Pakistani soldiers. The local collaborators belonging to the Razakars and the Al Badr set fire to 19 houses and 6 granaries in the village.

After the massacre, Naria became a deserted village and the dead bodies lay there without cremation. The skeletons of Kamini Kumar Deb and his wife were recovered from their burnt homestead two days later. As the stench from the dead bodies became unbearable, the Razakars threatened the relatives of the dead to bury the bodies or get killed. After the threats, five or six Hindus from nearby Abdalpur, Noagaon and Khagrakandi villages came and buried the dead bodies in the premises of Kamini Kumar Deb's residence.

== Aftermath ==
After the liberation of Bangladesh, the freedom fighters exhumed the skeletons and brought them to Maulvibazar. After counting the bodies, their skeletons were buried in the bed of the Manu river. After the assassination of Mujibur Rahman, a pre-planned dacoity took place in the house of Kamini Kumar Deb. His descendants sold their house and other properties, except the mass killing site. On 24 May 2011, the International Crimes Tribunal completed their investigations related to the massacre.

== See also ==
- Burunga massacre
- Makalkandi massacre
