= Mahanambrata Brahmachari =

Hindu monk (1904–1999)

- Mahanambrata Brahmachari in Chicago, 1937.
- Born: Bankim Dasgupta; 25 December 1904; Barisal District, Khalishakota Gram, Bengal Presidency, British India
- Died: 18 October 1999 (aged 94); Kolkata, West Bengal, India
- Known for: Religious leadership, academic scholarship
- Parent(s): Kalidas Dasgupta (father); Kaminisundari Devi (mother)

Mahanambrata Brahmachari (25 December 1904 – 18 October 1999), born Bankim Dasgupta, was a Hindu monk and the head of Mahanam Sampradaya, active in both India and Bangladesh. A member of the Mahauddharana order, he was also a writer, scholar, and participant in interfaith dialogue.

== Early life ==
Brahmachari was born into a Baidya family in Barisal District, Bengal Presidency, British India. He began primary education in 1909 and reportedly walked long distances to meet religious leader Prabhu Jagadbandhu, the founder of Mahanam Sampradaya.

== Religious training and education ==
He initially sought monastic life at Sri Angan, but was advised by spiritual leader Sripad Mahendraji to complete his education first. After earning a district scholarship in 1923, he resumed his religious path and was initiated into Sanyasa as Mahanambrata Brahmachari. Under Mahendraji’s direction, he pursued formal studies, earning a B.A. in Sanskrit from Government Rajendra College, Faridpur (1928), and an M.A. in Sanskrit from Calcutta University (1931).

== Academic and interfaith work ==
In the early 1930s, he represented the Mahanam Sampradaya at the World Fellowship of Faiths conference in Chicago. During this period, he earned a PhD in Vaishnava Theology from the University of Chicago. While in the United States, he met Thomas Merton, a Trappist monk, and encouraged him to explore his Christian heritage rather than learning Hinduism. Merton later credited Brahmachari with influencing his spiritual development.

== Post-partition activities ==
After the Partition of India in 1947, he remained in East Pakistan (now Bangladesh). Following violence against the Hindu community, he founded the Devasthali Samskara Samiti to support temple restoration and deity reinstallation. He oversaw these efforts in several districts including Dhaka, Narayanganj, and Sylhet. In 1975, he established the India and Bangladesh Sanatan Dharma Mahamandal to promote and protect Hindu religious and cultural interests. He was the head of Mahanam Sampradaya in both India and Bangladesh. He was a well known religious master and all his devotes worship his idol at Mahanam Angan in Kolkata, West Bengal, India.

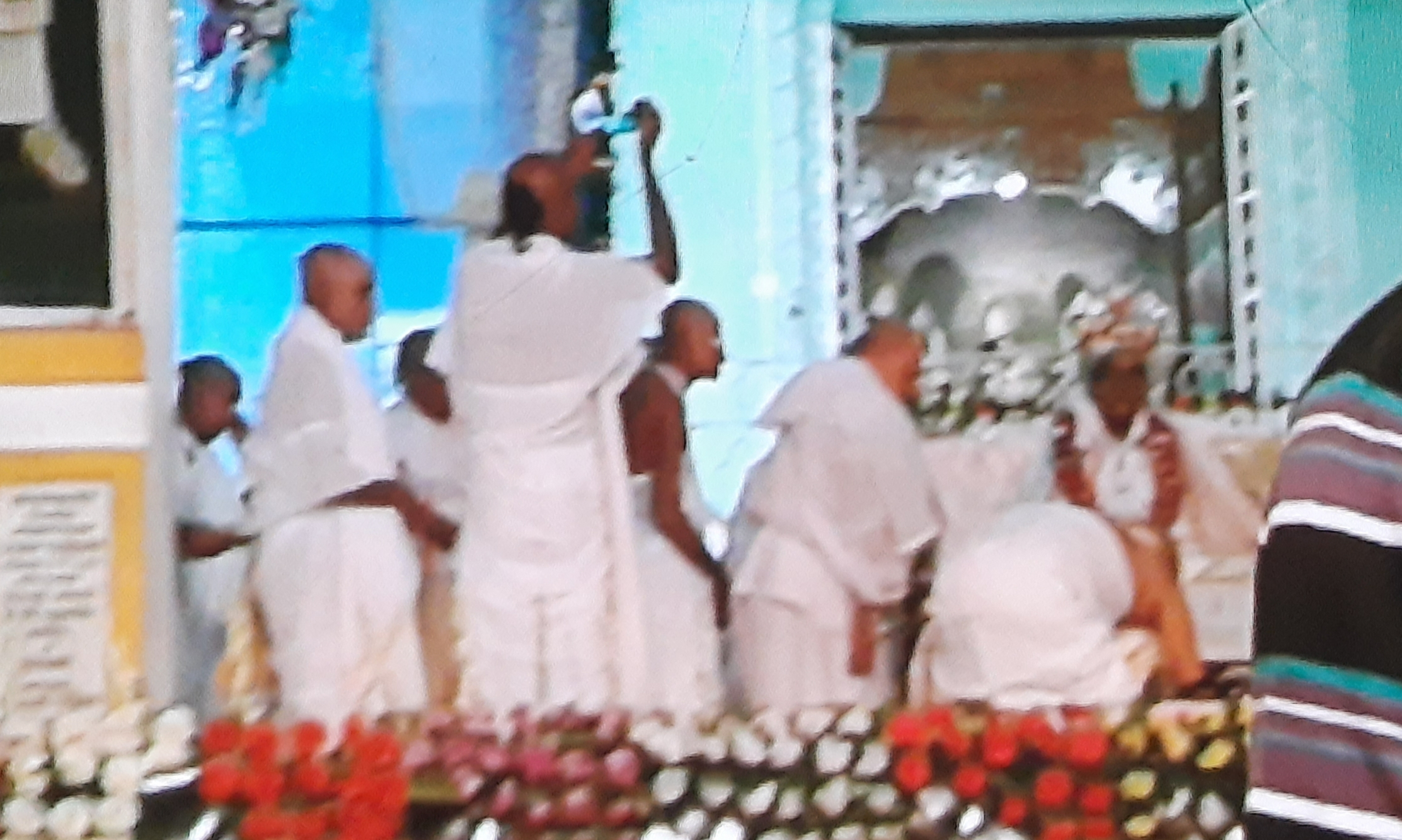
Worship of Mahanambrata Brahmachari's idol at Mahanam Angan, Kolkata on Guru Purnima.
