= Genocide Remembrance Day (Bangladesh) =

National day of remembrance in Bangladesh

Genocide Remembrance Day গণহত্যা স্মরণ দিবস
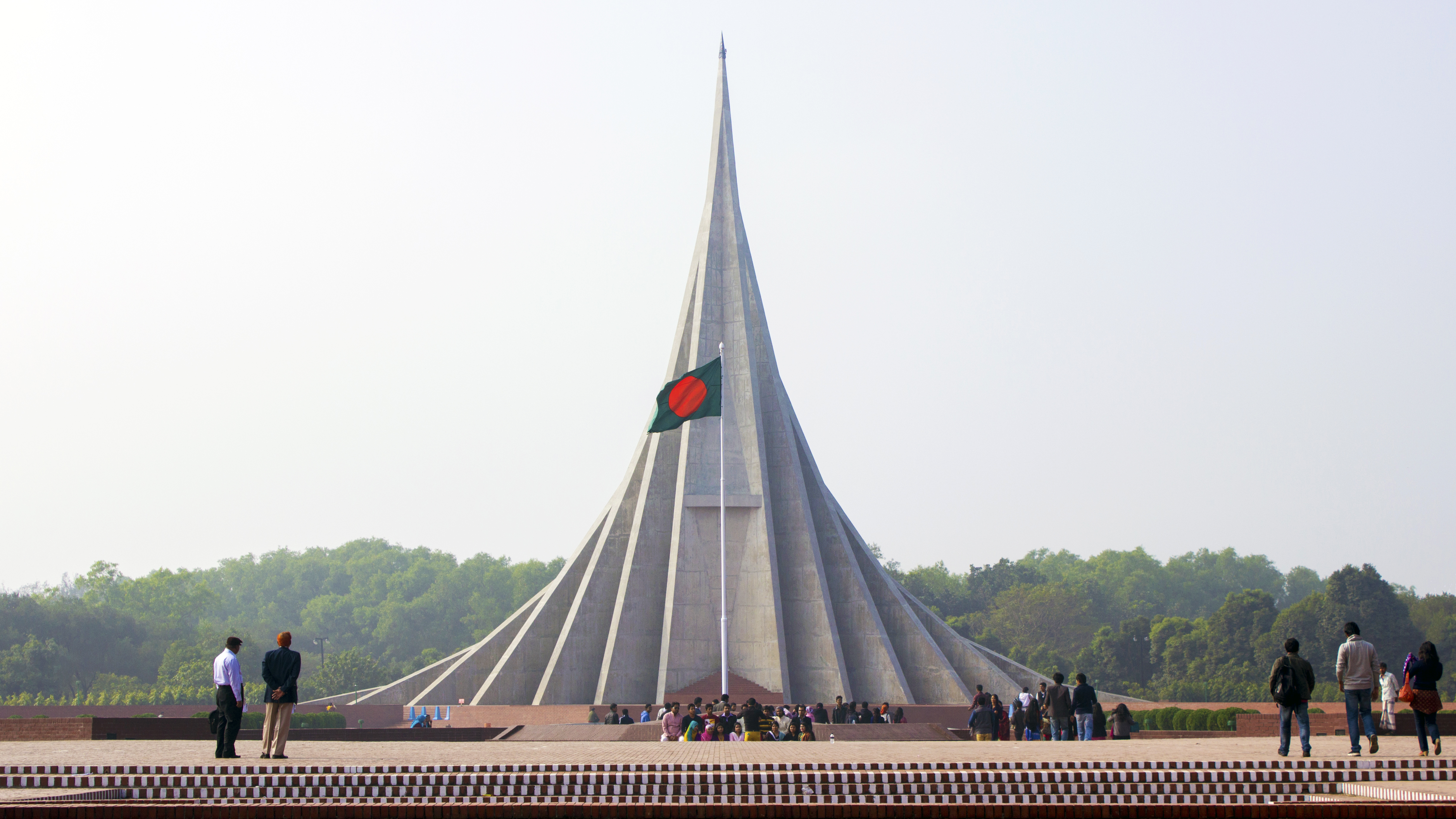
- National Martyrs' Memorial
- Observed by: Bangladesh; Bangladeshi diaspora
- Type: National
- Significance: Commemoration of the Bangladesh genocide
- Date: 25 March
- Frequency: Annual
- First time: 2017

Genocide Remembrance Day (Bengali: গণহত্যা স্মরণ দিবস, romanized: Gôṇôhôtyā Smôrôṇ Dibôs) is a national day of remembrance in Bangladesh observed on 25 March in commemoration of the victims of the Bangladesh genocide during the Bangladesh Liberation War in 1971.

On 11 March 2017, the Jatiya Sangsad unanimously passed a resolution designating 25 March as a Genocide Remembrance Day. The day honours and remembers those who suffered and died as a result of the actions of the Pakistan Army during Operation Searchlight, which initiated the Bangladesh Genocide culminating with the Independence of Bangladesh.

== History ==
The date 25 March commemorates Operation Searchlight, a planned military pacification carried out by the Pakistan Army, started on 25 March to curb the Bengali independence movement by taking control of the major cities on 26 March, and then eliminating all opposition, political or military, within one month. Two days after the beginning of the operation, foreign journalists were systematically deported from East Pakistan.

During this period, the persecution of the Bengali population by the Pakistan army was notable. It is believed this was on account of the contempt Punjabi Pakistanis had for Bengalis. There is evidence that among the Bengalis, the Hindu minority was doubly marked out for persecution. In a post-war enquiry several senior Pakistani officers admitted to systematic targeting of the Hindu community. General A. A. K. Niazi, commander of the Pakistani Eastern Command, denied ordering extermination of the Hindus.

"Bangladesh will reach out to UN seeking recognition of the 1971 Genocide while the government declared March 25 as Genocide Day", according to Liberation War Affairs Minister AKM Mozammel Huq.

== International recognition ==
The government of Bangladesh is working on achieving global recognition of March 25 as "Bangladesh's Genocide Day". Genocide Watch and Lemkin Institute for Genocide Prevention issued statements on the Bangladesh Genocide of 1971 perpetrated against Bangladeshi people by Pakistani Army. These statements will strengthen and accelerate Bangladesh's commitment to achieve global recognition of "Genocide Day". International Association of Genocide Scholars (IASG) on 25 March 2023 adopted a resolution recognizing the genocide committed by the Pakistani military during the Bangladesh Liberation War in 1971.

== Gallery ==
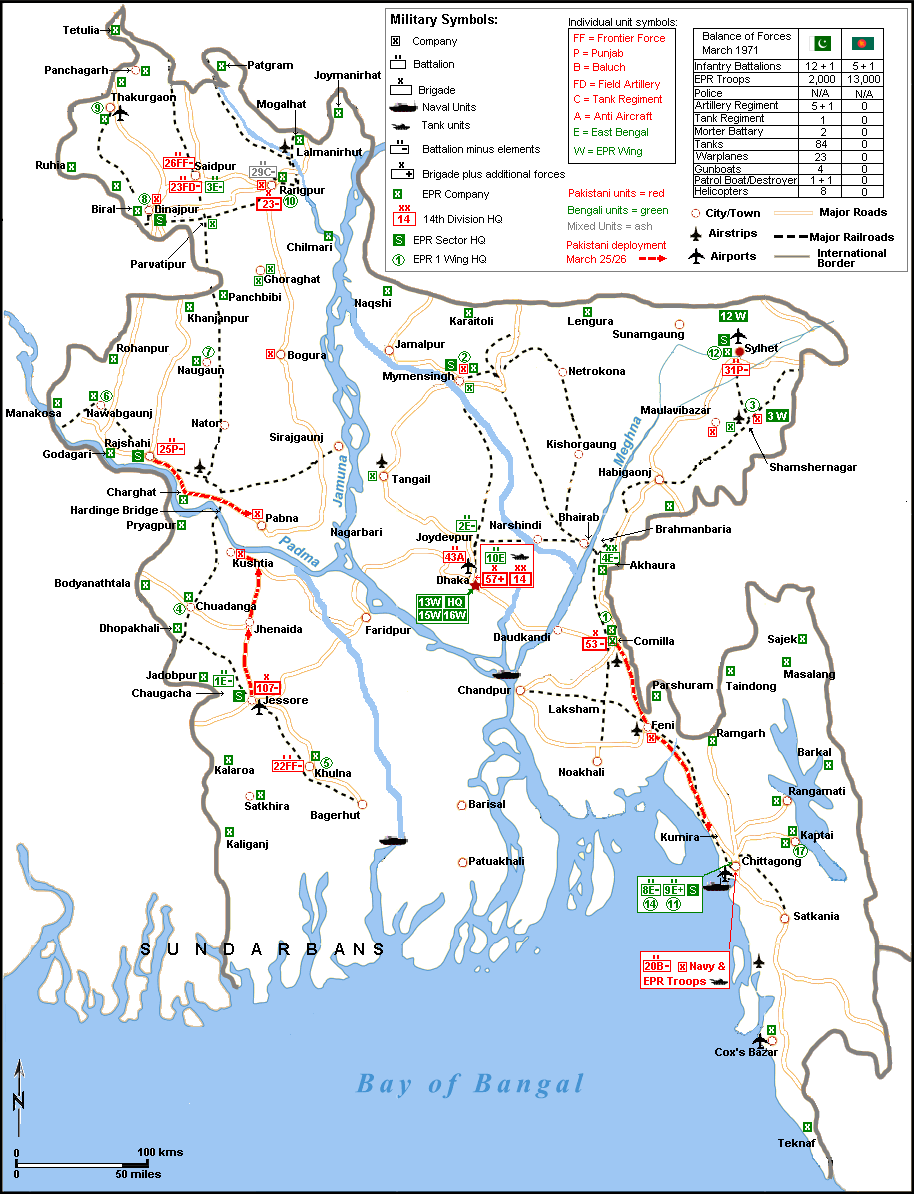
Location of Bengali and Pakistani military units during Operation Searchlight

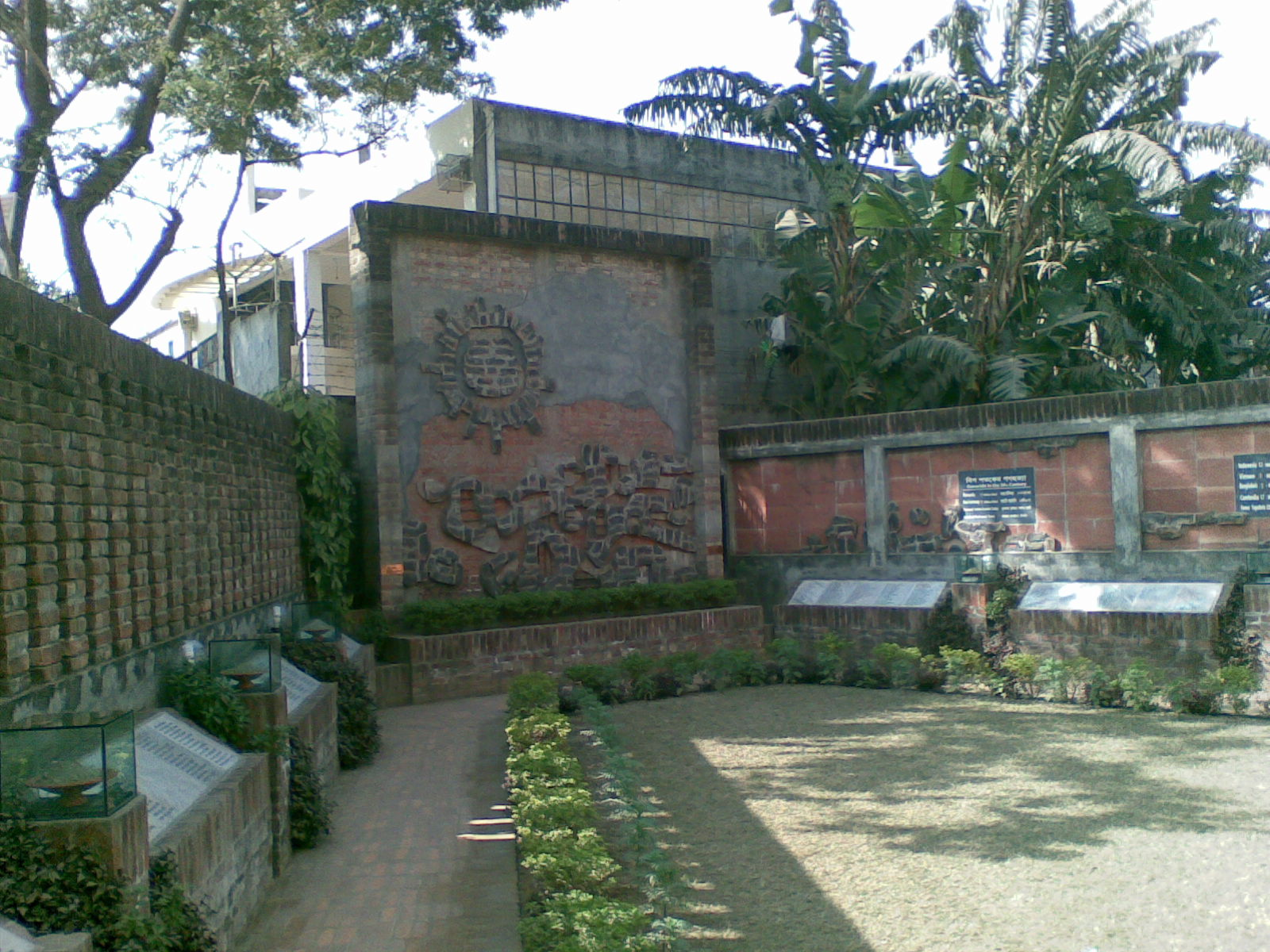
The Jallad Khana Memorial at one of the killing fields in Mirpur

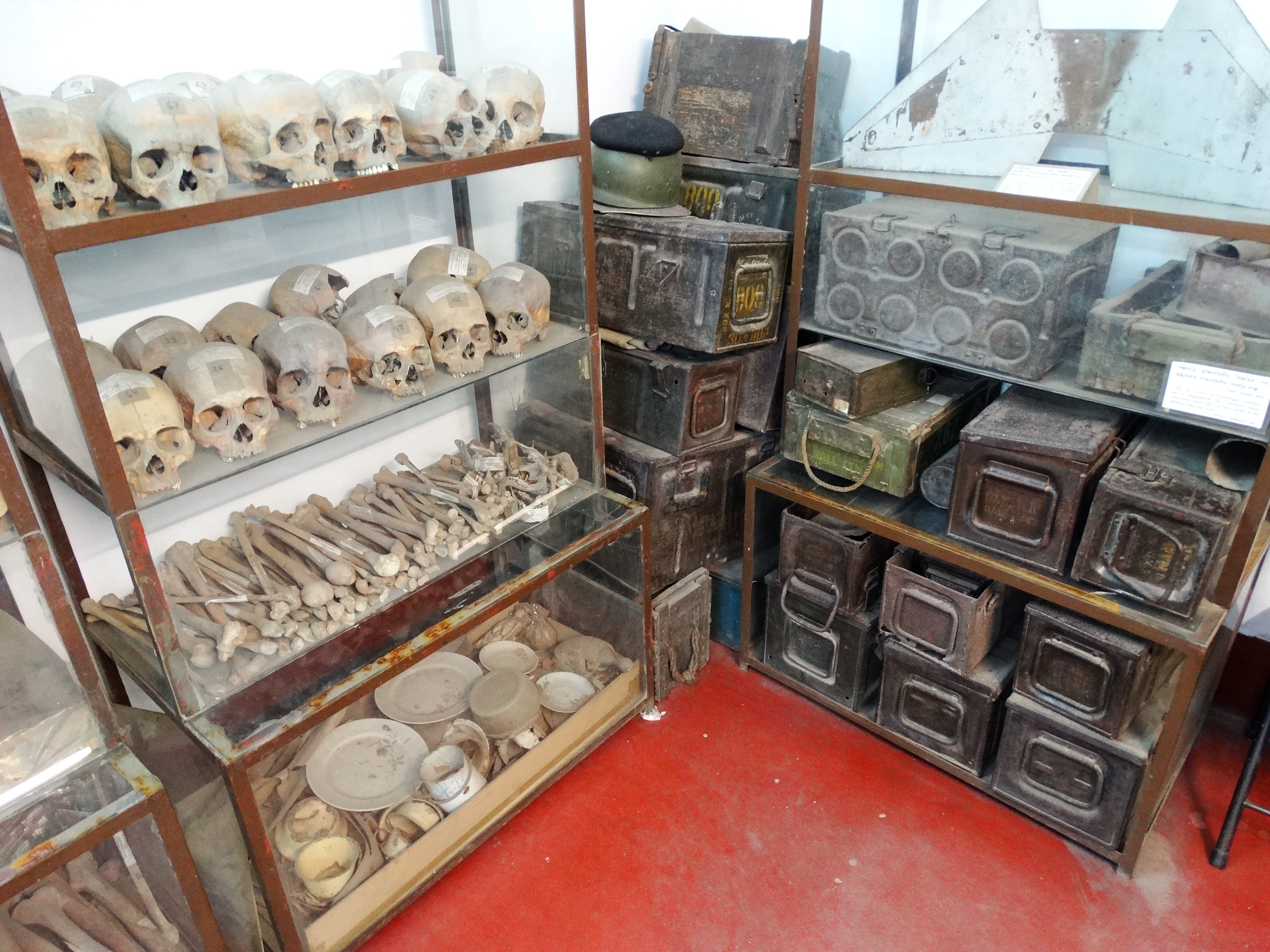
Human remains and war material in Liberation War Museum

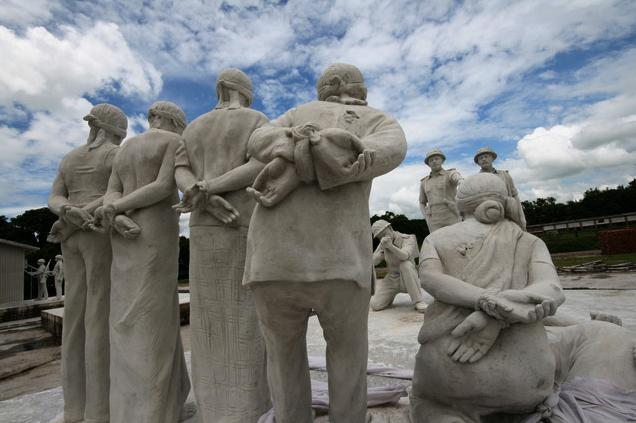
A sculpture in Meherpur showing the execution of Bengali intellectuals by the Pakistan Army

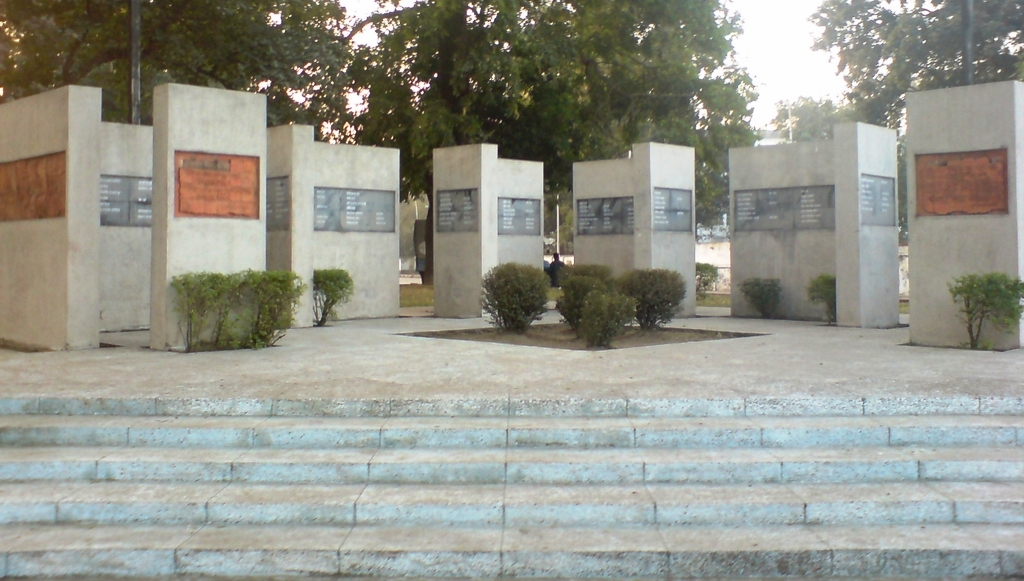
Monument in honor of those killed at Dhaka University

== See also ==
=== Massacres in Bangladesh ===
- Bangladesh genocide (1971)
  - Al Sham, perpetrator
  - East Pakistan Central Peace Committee, perpetrator
  - Razakars, perpetrator
- List of massacres in Bangladesh
  - July massacre

=== Related days ===
- Martyred Intellectuals Day
- Language Movement Day
- Independence and National Day
- Armenian Genocide Remembrance Day
