= Laxman Das =

Laxman Das (Bengali: লক্ষ্মণ দাস) was a wrestler, weight lifter, circus performer and the founder of Royal Pakistan Circus. In the genocide during the Bangladesh Liberation War, he was killed by the Pakistan Army.

== Early life and career ==
Das was born in Uttar Palardi village of greater Barisal district, now in Gaurnadi Upazila of Barisal District. Early in his career Das was a renowned wrestler and weightlifter. He also knew a little bit of magic. He used to perform tricks in schools and college without any payment. A maternal uncle enrolled Das in Lion Circus. At the Lion Circus, Das performed rare feats like cutting iron rods using teeth, bending iron rods using neck, weightlifting, throwing javelins and dagger boards. In 1948, Das formed his own circus known as the Royal Pakistan Circus.

== Death ==
In 1971, during the Bangladesh Liberation War the Pakistan Army set up a military camp at Gaurnadi College, adjacent to the house of Das. The collaborators alleged that Das had been training rebels under the guise of circus. Fearing a military raid, Das fled with his family to Kodaldhowa in present-day Agailjhara Upazila in Barisal District, leaving behind the circus equipment and the trained animals including elephants, tigers, bears and deer. The Pakistan Army looted the equipment and killed all the animals, including the elephant named Madhubala the star performer of Royal Pakistan Circus.

The Das family began to stay in a boat in the Ketnar Bil near Kodaldhowa village. In June, the Pakistan Army raided Kodaldhowa. When the soldiers went after the Das family in a boat, they jumped into the water in order to escape. While the two sons of Das swam to safety, Das and his wife were shot dead by the soldiers. The soldiers looted the gold and jewelry.

== Legacy ==
After the liberation of Bangladesh, Laxman Das' son Arun and Biren came together to form the circus again. The circus was named Laxman Das Circus in the memory of their father.

== See also ==
- Ketnar Bil massacre
