= Bagbati massacre =

1971 mass killing of Bengali civilians by Pakistani soldiers and militias

Coordinates: 24.54°N 89.62°E

Bagbati massacre বাগবাটি গণহত্যা
- Part of Bangladesh genocide
- Location: Bagbati, Pabna, East Pakistan
- Date: 27 May 1971 (UTC+6:00)
- Target: Bengali Hindus
- Attack type: Massacre
- Weapon: Rifles
- Deaths: More than 200
- Perpetrators: Al-Badr, Razakars, Peace Committee, Pakistan Army

Bagbati massacre (Bengali: বাগবাটি গণহত্যা) refers to the killings of more than 200 unarmed Bengali Hindus by the Al Badar, Pakistan Army, Razakars and Peace Committee, in the Bagbati Union of Sirajganj sub-division in the erstwhile district of greater Pabna in May 1971. After the massacre the bodies were buried or dumped in wells.

== Background ==
Bagbati Union was situated 14 km to the north west of Sirajganj sub-divisional headquarters. It is now under Sirajganj Sadar Upazila of Sirajganj District. When the Pakistan Army launched the Operation Searchlight and moved in to Sirajganj, hundreds of Bengali from Sirajganj and the surrounding areas took refuge in the villages of Bagbati, Harinagopal, Pipulberia and Dhaldob under Bagbati Union. A day before the massacre, a meeting was held at Ghorachara School between the Razakars and the Peace Committee. At the meeting it was decided that more than 500 people of Bagbati, Haringopal and Alokdia would be eliminated.

== Killings ==
On the early morning of 27 May, in a joint operation the Pakistani army, Al Badr, Razakars and the Peace Committee, surrounded the villages. The Al-Badr opened fire indiscriminately and killed more than two hundred people, mostly Bengali Hindus. Numerous residences were looted and set on fire by the Al-Badr, Razakars and the Peace Committee. The Pakistan Army raped the womenfolk. Days after the massacre, the survivors dumped the dead bodies in the wells of the deserted houses of the erstwhile landlords of Bagbati and Dhaldob.

== Commemoration ==
The victims of the massacre are remembered through memorial services every year. A few years back a small memorial was constructed in one of the wells where the victims bodies were dumped, in a joint initiative between the Bagbati Union Parishad and the locals. The locals have demanded the restoration of the mass killing site and the mass graves.

== See also ==
- Demra massacre
