= Barguna massacre =

Mass execution of civilians in Bangladesh

Coordinates: 22.1541°N 90.1265°E

Barguna massacre বরগুনা গণহত্যা
- Part of Bangladesh genocide
- Location: Barguna, Patuakhali district, Bangladesh
- Date: 29–30 May 1971 (UTC+6:00)
- Target: Bengalis (Mostly Hindus)
- Weapon: Firearms
- Deaths: More than 100
- Perpetrators: Pakistan Armed Forces, Peace Committee

The Barguna massacre (Bengali: বরগুনা গণহত্যা) was the mass execution of unarmed residents of Barguna in the Barguna sub-divisional jail by the Pakistan Armed Forces on 29 and 30 May 1971. More than 100 people were killed. Seventy-two of them were identified; the majority were Bengali Hindus, the rest Muslims, mostly supporters of the Awami League and sovereign Bangladesh.

In 1992, a memorial was constructed with a marble plaque containing the names of the 72 victims and six other victims killed elsewhere.

== Background ==
In 1969, Patuakhali district was carved out of the erstwhile Bakerganj district. The Patuakhali district consisted of the Patuakhali Sadar and Barguna sub-division. On 25 April 1971, the Pakistan Armed Forces launched Operation Barisal to capture Barisal. On 26 April, they occupied the Patuakhali district town. Major Raja Nadir Pervez Khan of the 6 Punjab Regiment was appointed as the Martial Law Administrator of Patuakhali district.

On 14 May, the Pakistan Armed Forces arrived at Barguna in a gunboat and took control of the town. On 15 May, they detained some residents of Patharghata and brought them to Barguna. Some of the detainees were killed on the banks of Bishkhali. The rest were imprisoned in the Barguna sub-divisional jail. Lakshman Das, a noted Bengali Hindu businessman from Patharghata and his three sons were among the imprisoned. The Pakistan Armed Forces then left for Patuakhali.

After the Pakistan Armed Forces left Barguna, the Peace Committee members announced that the Hindus can come back to town. None of them except the caste Hindus would be killed. After getting the assurance from the Peace Committee, many Bengali Hindus returned to their homes in Barguna. Service holders joined their office, others opened their shops.

== Killings ==
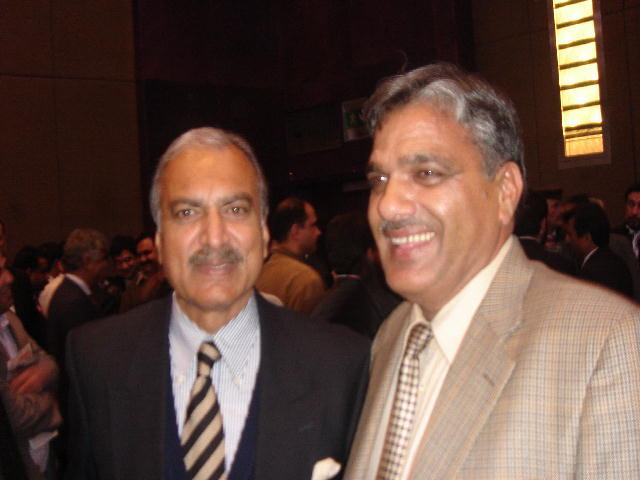
Major Nadir Pervez (left)

On 26 May, a contingent of five soldiers led by Captain Shafayet secretly arrived from Patuakhali in a speedboat. From the morning of 27 May, the Pakistani soldiers and their local collaborators raided the Barguna town. It was raining incessantly from the morning and most of the residents stayed indoors. Being unaware of the raid they did not get a chance to flee the town. The raiders targeted the Hindu localities of Amtala, Karmakarpatti and Nathpatti. By the evening they arrested around 500 – 600 residents, tied them with ropes and took them to the Barguna sub-divisional jail.

The captive men and women were segregated in separate male and female wards. According to eyewitness accounts there were around 150 female captives. The Pakistani soldiers used to pick up women according to their choice. If anybody refused, she was kicked or beaten up with the rifle butts or sometimes shot dead. The women were then taken to an adjacent empty ward, where they were gang-raped by the soldiers throughout the night. Some women were sent to the C & B bungalow where the Pakistan Armed Forces and the Peace Committee members set up their temporary camp. In the morning, the women were returned to the female ward of the prison. Some of the women were draped with red sarees to hide the blood stains resulting from rapes.

On 28 May, Major Nadir Pervez arrived in Barguna. On 29 May, Major Pervez constituted a tribunal within the Barguna sub-divisional jail for the trial of the inmates and left for Patuakhali. The tribunal sentenced the Bengali Hindus and the Muslims who supported the idea of sovereign Bangladesh to death after a brief trial. When the first bell rang in the Barguna Zilla School adjacent to the jail, the Pakistani soldiers fired at their targets. Lakshman Das and his son Arun Das were killed in the massacre. Dr. Krishna Das, a popular doctor of Barguna did not die immediately after being shot. He tried to escape by crawling across the WAPDA road, when his head was smashed by a spade.

After the killings, Peace Committee members buried the dead in the south western region of the jail compound. According to eyewitness accounts many women were denied the right to cremate their husbands. According to Dr. M. A. Hasan, the Convener of War Crimes Facts Finding Committee, 55 persons were killed on the first day and 36 people were killed on the next day. In other accounts the death toll is mentioned in hundreds.

== Aftermath ==
Many of the survivors were taken to Patuakhali and killed. Later on many people were killed in the prison compound during the course of the Bangladesh Liberation War. According to Dr. M.A.Hasan thousands of innocent people were killed by the Pakistan Armed Forces in the Patharghata, Amtali, Betagi and Bamni areas of the sub-division. However, no authentic data is available on the total numbers of deaths in the then Barguna sub-division or present day Barguna District. The victims of the massacre has been officially recognised as martyrs of the Liberation War by the Bangladesh government.

29 May is observed as Barguna Prison Massacre day in Barguna.

== See also ==
- Bhimnali massacre
