= Sree Angan massacre =

1971 mass killing in East Pakistan

Coordinates: 23.59685°N 89.82295°E

Sree Angan massacre শ্রীঅঙ্গন গণহত্যা
- Part of Bangladesh genocide
- Location: Faridpur, East Pakistan
- Date: 21 April 1971 (UTC+6:00)
- Target: Bengali Hindus
- Weapons: Light machine guns, semi-automatic rifles
- Deaths: 8
- Perpetrator: Pakistan Army

Sree Angan massacre (Bengali: শ্রীঅঙ্গন গণহত্যা) refers to the massacre of eight Bengali Hindu sanyasis of Sri Angan monastery by the occupying Pakistani Army in Faridpur, East Pakistan on 21 April 1971.

== Background ==
Sri Angan is a Hindu ashram of Mahanam Sampradaya founded by Prabhu Jagadbandhu order of Hinduism, in the Goalchamat locality of Faridpur town.

== Killings ==
On 21 April 1971, the Pakistan army landed in Faridpur District. From Dhaka they crossed the Padma at Goalundo Ghat and proceeded towards Faridpur District. Around evening as they were entering Faridpur District they were passing through Goalchamat. At this point, their Bihari collaborator stopped them by the Shree Angon ashram. The Pakistan Army surrounded the ashram and with the help of Bihari collaborators entered the compound. At the news of their arrival, some of the resident sannyasis fled the ashram. But nine sannyasis did not leave the ashram. At that time the sannyasis were doing kirtan in the prayer hall of the ashram. The kirtan had chants of "Jaya Jaya Jagadbandhu Hari!! "Jaya Jaya Jagadbandhu Hari!!". It is said that the Pakistani soldiers misheard the chants as "Jai Bangabandhu" and the Bihari collaborators too convinced them that the sanyasis were praying for victory to Sheikh Mujibur Rahman.

The Pakistani soldiers entered the prayer hall and pulled the sannyasis to the open space in front of the temple, beneath the elephant apple tree in the ashram premises. One sanyasi, Nabakumar Brahmachari escaped and locked himself up in the room beneath the staircase. The remaining eight were made to stand in a line in front the Pakistani soldiers who had already taken position. According to eyewitness accounts, twelve shots were fired one by one. The sannyasis chanted "Jaya Jagadbandhu Hari" as they dropped dead.

The soldiers and the Bihari collaborators looted valuables and cash from the ashram. On the next morning, the corpses were taken away by a Faridpur Municipality truck. 5 days later, the Pakistan army destroyed the spire of the temple using dynamite.

== Aftermath ==
The brutal killings on the very first day of Pakistani operations created panic among the Hindu citizens. Many of them left the town for countryside. Two surviving sanyasis Amarbandhu Brahmachari and Haripriya Brahmachari recovered the holy relic of Prabhu Jagadbandhu Sundar and carried it in a casket to India.

According to Rabindranath Trivedi, Captain Jamshed, who commanded the massacre and the subsequent desecration and destruction of the ashram, committed suicide in front of the altar of Prabhu Jagadbandhu Sundar a few days before the surrender of Pakistani Armed Forces on 16 December 1971. He was reportedly found dead within the Shree Angon compound, near the pond of the Shiva temple by the collaborators. According to freedom fighter Prabodh Kumar Sarkar, Captain Jamshed had become a lunatic before his death. The sannyasis returned to the ashram after the liberation of Bangladesh. They restored the holy relic and rebuilt the damaged temple. New sannyasis were gradually initiated in the order.

== Memorial ==
In 1996, a memorial was erected in the compound of Shree Angon by the ashram authority. Eight black plaques were created for the eight deceased sanyasis. The plaques have the shape of truncated pyramid with a square base measuring 40 square centimeters and 95 centimeters in height.

A memorial has also been erected in Sri Sri Mahanam Angan at Kolkata, West Bengal, India. The names of the 8 sanyasis are written in 8 pieces of engraved marbles in the memorial.

== See also ==
- Ishangopalpur massacre
- Char Bhadrasan massacre
- Hasamdia massacre
- Prabhu Jagadbandu
