= Shankharikathi massacre =

Coordinates: 22.65°N 89.88°E

Shakharikathi massacre শাঁখারীকাঠি হত্যাকান্ড
- Part of Bangladesh genocide
- Location of the massacre in Bangladesh
- Location: Shankharikathi, Khulna District, East Pakistan
- Date: 4 November 1971 (UTC+6:00)
- Target: Bengali Hindus
- Attack type: Massacre
- Weapon: Rifles
- Deaths: 42
- Perpetrator: Razakars

Shankharikathi massacre (Bengali: শাঁখারীকাঠি হত্যাকান্ড) refers to the killings of 42 unarmed Hindus by the Razakars in Shankharikathi market, Alukdia village of greater Khulna district in Bangladesh on 4 November 1971.

== Background ==
Shankharikathi market is located in Alukdia village, which now falls under Kachua Upazila in Bagerhat District of Khulna Division. In 1971 it was within the Bagerhat sub-division of erstwhile greater Khulna district. During the Bangladesh Liberation War, Jamaat-e-Islami leader AKM Yusuf Ali formed the Razakar force at Khan Jahan Ali Road in Khulna with 96 Jamaat members. The Razakars had set up camp all over erstwhile greater Khulna, including the Daibagyahati camp in present-day Bagerhat District. In the middle of July a group of Razakars forcibly converted around 200 Hindus to Islam at the Shankharikathi market. The Hindus were given Islamic names and forced to consume beef, an act considered a sacrilege for Hindus.

== Killings ==
On 3 November, the Mukti Bahini had attacked a Razakar camp in Daibagyahati, now in Morrelganj Upazila of Bagerhat District. During the attack, the Razakars captured Mahadev Saha, who happened to be from Alukdia village. On the afternoon of 4 November, a contingent of armed Razakars from the Daibagyahati Razakar camp, led by Commander Mujibur Rahman Mollah, arrived in Alukdia village with Mahadev Saha in captivity.

They encircled the Shankharikathi market from three sides and rounded up around 90 Hindu males of various ages. The Hindus were tied up in pairs and made to stand in a line. With the blow of a whistle, they were shot by the Razakars. 42 died while the rest survived with injuries. The Razakars looted some of the adjacent Hindu villages and set them on fire. On the evening of 6 November, local villagers rescued the wounded from the Shankharikathi market. Later the Razakars forced the villagers to take the corpses of the deceased to the banks of Bishkhali River, where they were buried.

== Commemoration ==
On 4 November 2010, the victims of the massacre were officially commemorated for the first time through a ceremony. Later a plaque with the names of the victims on it were erected at the site of the killings.

== Investigations ==
On 9 January 2013, a nine-member team of the International Crimes Tribunal (Bangladesh) visited Shankharikathi to investigate the war crimes committed by A. K. M. Yusuf. The massacre in Shankharikathi was committed by a unit of the Razakar forced founded by Yusuf. According to investigating officer Mohammad Helal Uddin, Sirajul Islam Master was the platoon commander of the Razakar unit.

== See also ==
- Chuknagar massacre
- Dakra massacre
