= Adityapur massacre =

1971 massacre of Bengali Hindus

Coordinates: 24.61°N 91.73°E

- Part of Bangladesh genocide
- Native name: আদিত্যপুর গণহত্যা
- Location: Adityapur, Balaganj, Sylhet, East Pakistan
- Date: 14 June 1971 (UTC+6:00)
- Target: Bengali Hindus
- Attack type: Massacre
- Weapon: Rifles
- Deaths: 63
- Perpetrators: Pakistani Army, Razakars

Adityapur massacre (Bengali: আদিত্যপুর গণহত্যা) refers to the massacre of 63 Bengali Hindus by the Pakistani army during the Bangladesh Liberation War at Adityapur in East Pakistan. On 14 June 1971, the Pakistani army in collaboration with the Razakars, killed 63 Bengali Hindus in the village of Adityapur in Sylhet district.

== Background ==
The village of Adityapur was under Balaganj Union within the jurisdiction of Balaganj police station in the district of Sylhet. Adityapur was a prosperous Hindu inhabited village on the banks of the Kushiara river. In 1971, when the Pakistani army launched the Operation Searchlight and began widespread massacre of the Hindu population, hundreds of thousands of Hindus began to flee to India. In Balaganj, the Hindus had stayed on instead of taking refuge in India.

== Killings ==
On the early morning of 14 June, almost two hours before the sunrise, a contingent of Pakistani army consisting of 25 to 30 soldiers arrived in the village of Adityapur in four tanks. Within half an hour the Pakistani army encircled the village with the help of local Razakars, even as the village was asleep. Then they announced through loudspeakers that they arrived in the village to constitute a local unit of the Peace Committee and distribute the dandy cards among the minority Hindus. The Hindus were forced out of their houses at gunpoint and made to assemble in front of the Adityapur Government Primary School. Sixty-five men were tied up and made to stand in front of a shooting squad.

The Pakistani army held a discussion with local leader Abdul Ahad Chowdhury. After the discussion the captain ordered to fire. The soldiers fired at the captive Hindus, killed 63 of them instantly. Two of them survived by feigning to be dead. After that, the Razakars looted the village while the Pakistani army went after the women. One woman was taken captive in the house of Abdul Ahad Chowdhury.

== Aftermath ==
On 17 June, when the stench of the bodies became unbearable, the Razakars buried the corpses. However, on 22 June, a group of freedom fighters under the command of M.A.G.Osmani exhumed the corpses and took them to Sylhet. The number of dead were counted and identified in front of national and international media and then brought back to Adityapur again. They were buried in front of the Adityapur Government Primary School.
