= Bakhrabad massacre =

1971 massacre in Bangladesh

Bakhrabad massacre বাখরাবাদ গণহত্যা
- Part of Bangladesh genocide
- Location: 23.717°N 90.883°E; Bakhrabad, Comilla, Bangladesh
- Date: 24 May 1971 (UTC+6:00)
- Target: Bengali Hindus
- Attack type: Burst fire, mass murder, massacre
- Weapon: Light machine guns
- Deaths: 142
- Perpetrators: Pakistani Army, Razakars

The Bakhrabad massacre (Bengali: বাখরাবাদ গণহত্যা) was a massacre of the Hindu population of Bakhrabad village, in the district of the Comilla, on 24 May 1971 by the Pakistani army with the help of Al Badr and Al Shams, during the Bangladesh Liberation War.
