= Madhyapara massacre =

Massacre in the Bangladesh War of Independence

Madhyapara massacre; মধ্যপাড়া হত্যাকান্ড
- Part of Bangladesh genocide
- Location: Palong, Faridpur, Bangladesh
- Date: 22 May 1971 (UTC+6:00)
- Target: Bengali Hindus
- Attack type: Massacre
- Weapon: Rifles
- Deaths: ~370
- Perpetrators: Pakistani Army, Razakars

The Madhyapara Massacre refers to the alleged massacre of unarmed Hindu residents of Madhyapara and other nearby villages under the authority of the Palong police station in the Faridpur district, by the Pakistan army on 22 May 1971. An estimated 370 people were killed in the massacre. In 1971, the villages of Madhyapara, Kashabhog, and Rudrakar were under the authority of the Palong police station of Madaripur sub-division in Faridpur District. They are now under the jurisdiction of the Shariatpur municipality in Shariatpur Sadar Upazila of Shariatpur District. The three villages at the time were largely Hindu-inhabited and Madhyapara was totally Hindu.

== Memorial ==
In 2010, a memorial was erected in Madhyapara Village in memory of the victims. It lists the names of the 73 victims who were identified up to that point.
