= Bhimnali massacre =

1971 Bangladesh genocide

Coordinates: 22.22°N 89.94°E

Bhimnali massacre ভীমনলী হত্যাকান্ড
- Part of Bangladesh genocide
- Location: Bhimnali, Barisal, Bangladesh
- Date: 22 May 1971 (UTC+6:00)
- Target: Bengali Hindus
- Weapon: Firearms
- Deaths: 15
- Perpetrator: Peace Committee

The Bhimnali Massacre was a massacre of 15 Bengali Hindus in Bhimnali, Barisal by Pakistani forces. On 22 May 1971 local collaborators attacked the village of Nali in Barisal District of Bangladesh. The Bengali Hindu villagers resisted with spears and shields. However, they were soon overpowered by the collaborators, who shot dead 15 villagers.

== Background ==
The village of Bhimnali presently falls under Sapleja Union of Mathbaria Upazila in Pirojpur District of Bangladesh. In 1971, Mathabaria police station fell under the Pirojpur sub-division of Bakerganj district. The village of Bhimnali or Nali Bhim or simply Nali is situated by the Nali canal. It is located 18 km from the Mathbaria Upazila headquarters. In 1971, it was a predominantly Bengali Hindu village. There were 80 Bengali Hindu families settled along the WAPDA embankment.

During the Bangladesh Liberation War, the communication to the village was seriously affected. It was practically cut off from the rest of the country, and so it was frequented by the freedom fighters. Many Bengali Hindus from the nearby villages took refuge in Bhimnali. On 16 May, at a public rally, Abdul Jabbar Engineer declared that the freedom fighters, Awami League workers and Hindus were the enemies of Pakistan and should be destroyed. Immediately after the rally, the crowd attacked Kalupara and Nathpara, the Hindu quarters of Tushkhali village.

== Killings ==
On 22 May at around 10 am, a group of around 500 armed collaborators surrounded the village. Sensing danger, the villagers gathered at the homestead of the Barui family. As the collaborators approached the village, around 200 Bengali Hindus armed themselves with sticks, spears and shields and took up position on the WAPDA dam. As the collaborators opened fire on them, they tried to defend themselves with shields. Fifteen were shot dead and the rest retreated. Abdul Jabbar Engineer himself shot dead Sakhanath Kharati on the spot. One collaborator named Lalu Khan was killed. The collaborators dragged the dead bodies of the villagers and threw them into the canal. After the killings, the collaborators looted the 80 Bengali Hindu households and set them on fire.

== Aftermath ==
After the massacre many Bengali Hindus were forced to leave the village. After the liberation of Bangladesh, the families returned to their homes. On 19 April 1972, one of the survivors, named Yajneshwar Barui, filed a lawsuit at the sub-divisional court at Pirojpur. The lawsuit named 259 collaborators, with Abdul Jabbar Engineer as the prime accused. Six months later, Barui was picked up by unidentified miscreants at night and shot dead. Another villager, named Binod Bihari Barui, who had defended the village during the attack, was strangulated to death. Later the lawsuit went missing from the court as well as the police station.
