= Burunga massacre =

1971 mass killing in East Pakistan

Burunga massacre বুরুঙ্গা গণহত্যা
- Part of Bangladesh Liberation War
- Location: 24.673°N 91.746°E; Burunga, Sylhet, East Pakistan
- Date: 26 May 1971; 12 noon (UTC+6:00)
- Target: Bengali Hindu villagers
- Attack type: Burst fire, mass murder, massacre
- Weapon: Light Machine Guns
- Deaths: 71–94
- Perpetrators: Pakistani Army, Razakars

Burunga massacre (Bengali: বুরুঙ্গা গণহত্যা) was a massacre of at least 71 members of the Hindu population of Burunga and nearby villages on the Burunga High School grounds, in the district of Sylhet by the Pakistani army on 26 May 1971.

== Background ==
The village of Burunga is situated near Osmaninagar in Sylhet District of present-day Bangladesh. On the afternoon of 25 May, tension mounted in Burunga and nearby villages over the arrival of Pakistani soldiers. At 4 pm they met local union chairman Injad Ali. After the meeting, it was announced by the beating of drums in Burunga and other nearby villages that on the morning of 26 May, a peace committee would be formed and 'peace cards' would be distributed from the grounds of Burunga High School.

== Killings ==
In spite of fear, the residents of Burunga and nearby villages began to assemble at the Burunga High School grounds from 8 am the next day. More than a thousand people gathered at the school premises. At around 9 am, collaborators Abdul Ahad Chowdhury and Dr. Abdul Khaleque arrived in a jeep at the school ground along with a Pakistani army contingent led by Captain Nur Uddin. They tallied the attendance against a list they had with them and felt satisfied. Meanwhile, another group went from door to door in the village and commanded the males to assemble at the school ground. At around 10 am, they segregated the crowd into Hindus and Muslims. The Hindus were herded into the office room and the Muslims were taken into a class room inside the school building. The latter were made to recite the kalma and the Pakistani national anthem and then most of them were let off. The remaining Muslims were asked to tie the Hindus with ropes in batches of four. Some of the Hindus began to cry out of fear. In the meantime, one of the captive Hindus Srinibas Chakraborty had managed to open one of the windows. Priti Ranjan Chowdhury, the Headmaster of the Burunga High School, who was among the captives, along with Ranu Malakar, a Hindu youth, jumped out of the window. The Pakistani army opened fire on them, but they managed to escape.

At about noon, the Hindus were brought outside to the grounds from the school building and ninety of them were made to stand in three columns. They were burst fired from three light machine guns, under the command of Captain Nur Uddin. The Pakistani army then poured kerosene over the dead bodies and set them on fire. Ram Ranjan Bhattacharya, a prominent and influential lawyer at the Sylhet Judges Court who too was being held by the Pakistani forces, was let go. As soon as he got up from his chair, he was shot from behind. He died instantaneously. After the massacre, a group of eight to ten collaborators led by Abdul Ahad Chowdhury and Dr. Abdul Khaleque looted the village and molested the womenfolk. On the next day, the Pakistani forces arrived again at Burunga. They hired some labourers with the help of chairman Injad Ali and buried the burnt and half burnt remains of the Hindu corpses in a pit beside the Burunga High School. A few Hindus, including Srinibas Chakraborty, Jitendra Baidya and Adhir Malakar, survived the massacre even after receiving multiple bullet wounds.

There is no consensus on the number of the dead, with estimates ranging from 71 to 94. According to survivor Srinibas Chakraborty, 94 persons were killed. However, it is generally accepted that 78 Hindus were killed in the massacre.

== Memorial ==
In 1984, the government of Bangladesh enclosed the mass killing site with a brick wall. Later, a memorial for the victims of the genocide has been raised.

== See also ==
- Makalkandi massacre
- Naria massacre
