= Akhira massacre =

1971 mass killing

Coordinates: 25.80°N 88.88°E

- Part of Bangladesh genocide
- Native name: আখিরা গণহত্যা
- Location: Baraihat, Dinajpur, East Pakistan
- Date: 17 April 1971 (UTC+6:00)
- Target: Bengali Hindus
- Attack type: Burst fire, Mass murder, Massacre, Gang Rape
- Weapon: Machine guns
- Deaths: 93-125
- Perpetrators: Pakistani army, Razakars

Akhira massacre (Bengali: আখিরা গণহত্যা) was a massacre of the emigrating Hindus of the then Dinajpur district near Baraihat on 17 April 1971 by the Pakistani army with collaboration from the local Razakars. Between 93-125 Hindus were massacred.

== Events ==
In April 1971, a member of the Razakar forces, Kenan Uddin Sarkar of Ramchandrapur village under Parbatipur sub-division of Dinajpur district, assured 50 Hindu families of the neighbouring areas of Badarganj, Kholahati, Birampur, Aftabganj, and Sherpur of safe passage to India. He kept the Hindus confined at Baraihat (present-day Phulbari Upazila). The Razakars and the Al-Badr militia looted the money and jewelry from Hindus during their confinement. After that another Razakar, an associate of Kenan Uddin Sarkar informed the Pakistani army.

The Pakistani Army took the hostage Hindus to Akhira, 100 metres from south of Baraihat. It was about 11 A.M. The Hindus were made to stand in a row beside a pond, the men in one line and the women and children in another. They were burst fired from machine guns. A few children and teenagers who survived the burst fire were bayonetted to death. According to eyewitness accounts, after gunning down the men, the Pakistani soldiers turned their attention to the females, and brutally gang raped them at that spot. After the victory in the Liberation War, the local people executed Kenan Uddin Sarkar by the method of Jabiha.
