= Galimpur massacre =

Massacre of Hindus by Pakistani Army

Galimpur massacre গালিমপুর গণহত্যা
- Part of Bangladesh genocide
- 24°39′55″N 91°38′57″E
- Location: Galimpur, Balaganj, Sylhet, East Pakistan
- Date: 20 May 1971 (UTC+6:00)
- Target: Bengali Hindus
- Attack type: Massacre
- Weapon: Rifles
- Deaths: 33
- Perpetrators: Pakistani Army, Razakars

Galimpur massacre (Bengali: গালিমপুর গণহত্যা) was a massacre of the Hindu population of Galimpur in the district of Sylhet by the Pakistani army on 20 May 1971.

== Background ==
The village of Galimpur was located on the northern banks of the Kushiara river in the jurisdiction of Balaganj police station in the district of Sylhet. On 18 May 1971, the villagers of Galimpur had an altercation with the villagers of nearby Ballabhpur regarding the harvesting of crop. The two parties were called to a village court where the matter was settled. On the morning of 19 May, Madrichh Ali of nearby Fazilpur arrived at Galimpur along with his associates. He explained to the villagers that the captain of the Pakistani army camping at Sherpur had come to know of the dispute. The village of Galimpur can only be saved from attack by the army only if they pay enough money. The villagers of Galimpur were extorted of two thousand five hundred rupees in this manner.

== Killings ==
On the afternoon of 20 May, at around 2 P.M., the Pakistani army entered Galimpur through Ballabhpur by the way of Goalabazar. They were led by local Razakar Abdul Ahad Chowdhury and Kala Maulavi, a madrassa teacher from Sherpur. On entering they rounded up six villagers and shot them dead. They were later buried beside the flood control embankment on the Kushiara. When the villagers began running for their lives, the Pakistani soldiers fired indiscriminately killing 26 villagers including four teenagers. then they looted the village of gold, jewellery, cash and other valuables. Finally they set the village on fire. They took hostage two women from the village. More than hundred houses in the village was burnt to ashes within two to three hours.

== Aftermath ==
After the Liberation War, M.A.G. Osmani visited Galimpur. He provided a relief of two thousand rupees and 14 corrugated iron sheets to each affected family. He himself distributed food among the villagers. He also made plans for the permanent rehabilitation of the victims through setting up a hand loom industry. He arranged for two hand looms and a capital of ten thousand rupees to found a co-operative. He also promised to build up a memorial in the memory of the victims. In 2000, the memorial was built with funding from M.P. Shah Azizur Rahman.
