= Suryamani massacre =

Suryamani massacre সূর্যমণি হত্যাকান্ড
- Part of Bangladesh genocide
- Location: Suryamani, Barisal, East Pakistan
- Date: 7 October 1971 (UTC+6:00)
- Target: Bengali Hindus
- Attack type: Massacre
- Weapon: Rifles
- Deaths: 24
- Perpetrator: Razakars

The Suryamani massacre (Bengali: সূর্যমণি হত্যাকান্ড) of 24 Bengali Hindus took place on the early hours of 7 October 1971 in Suryamani village of the then Barisal district in East Pakistan. The Razakars shot dead 24 Bengali Hindus.

== Background ==
The village of Suryamani was located in Pirojpur sub-division of erstwhile Barisal district, now under Mathbaria Upazila of Pirojpur District. The village is two and a half kilometres to the east of Mathbaria Upazila headquarters. Towards the south of the village is a WAPDA embankment.

== Killings ==
On the night of 6 October, a group of 60-65 armed Razakars raided the houses of Haldar and Mitra families in the village of Angulkata now under Sadar Union of Mathbaria Upazila. The Razakars were led by Commander Iskander Ali Mridha, Mukul Ahmed Badshah, Ansar Ali Khalifa and Syed Howladar. They broke open the doors and tied up the men, women and children. After that they raped the women, and took 37 men captive, tied with ropes. The men were taken to Mathbaria police station. Seven of them were released for a huge ransom. They rest 30 were taken to the WAPDA embankment to the south of Suryamani village. They were made to stand in a line and shot by the Razakars. 24 Bengali Hindus died on the spot. Six others survived the bullet wounds.

== Investigation ==
On 8 October 2010, survivor Jnanendra Mitra filed a lawsuit with the Court of Senior Assistant Judge at Mathbaria against eight persons, accusing them of the killings. The lawsuit accused Abdur Jabbar Engineer (Vice Chairman of Jatiya Party and former M.P. from Pirojpur-3 constituency), Iskander Ali Mridha (Charmain of Tikikata Union and leader of Bangladesh Nationalist Party), Mukul Ahmed Badshah (Industrialist and Jatiya Party leader), Mohammad Ansar Ali Khalifa (Jamaat-e-Islami leader), Mohammad Habib Mian Howladar, Ruhul Amin and Mohammad Alam Mridha of the war crimes.

The judge directed the Officer in Charge of Mathbaria police station to lodge an FIR and investigate into the matter. When the police asked for further directive from the court, the judge referred the case to the International Crimes Tribunal. The International Crimes Tribunal have visited the place twice for investigation. The tribunal has so far collected the testimony of 18 witnesses.
