= Mahanam Sampradaya =

Famous Hindu religious tradition of Bengal

- Bengali: মহানাম সম্প্রদায়
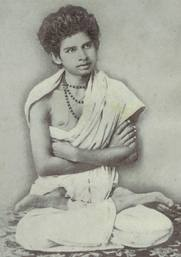
- Prabhu Jagadbandhu considered a deity by Mahanam Sampradaya
- Formation: 1891 as movement
- Founder: Prabhu Jagadbandhu (Inspirator); Sripad Mahendraji (Organisator)
- Founded at: Bengal, British India
- Type: hindu denomination religious organization
- Purpose: Educational, Philanthropic, Religious Studies, Spirituality
- Headquarters: Mahauddharana Math, Maniktala, Kolkata, West Bengal, India; Sri Angan, Faridpur, Bangladesh
- Location: ashrams/temples, dispensary, medical camps, schools
- Region served: India & Bangladesh
- Members: more than 1 million
- Official languages: Bengali
- Previous Head: Mahanambrata Brahmachari, Nabanibandhu Brahmachari
- Current Head: Upasakbandhu Bramachari in India and Kantibandhu Brahmachari in Bangladesh
- Key people: Mahanambrata Brahmachari
- Affiliations: Hinduism

Mahanam Sampradaya (Bengali: মহানাম সম্প্রদায়) is a monastic organisation founded in the last decade of the 19th century within Hinduism in the Bengal Presidency of colonial British India and spiritually inspired by Prabhu Jagadbandhu. As the tradition-sampradaya is also known as a Krishnaite institution and it was formed in the early 20th century by Sripad Mahendraji. Presently followers of Mahanam Sampradaya are centered in both India and Bangladesh. Radha Krishna, Gaur Nitai and Prabhu Jagadbandhu are the chief deities worshiped by the Mahanam Sampradaya.

== History of formation ==
=== Arrival of new incarnation ===
Formation of Mahanam Sampradaya started with the advent of Prabhu Jagadbandhu (1871 – 1921) — a mystic and author of Kirtan songs—who was the focus of a new revival movement within the Bengali Vaishnavas in the last decade 19th century, and whom Mahanam Sampradaya (and many others) believe as an Avatar of Krishna as Chaitanya Mahaprabhu and Nityananda. At the first time, in 1891 Annada Charan Datta—the leader of Hari Sabha, a circle of devotees at Hooghly—was reported to have had a vision that Chaitanya Mahaprabhu was reincarnate in the form of Prabhu Jagadbandhu.

Prabhu Jagadbandu was a great Hindu saint and yogi from Gaudiya Vaishnavism. He said

Show kindness and compassion and do well to all people. Make a free gift of religion to all. Initiation in the hallowed name of Hari is the sure means of attaining salvation (i.e. deliverance from all agonies and sufferings). This is the secret of salvation. This is the secret of eternal good done to others

— Prabhu Jagadbandhu

=== Preaching of Vaishnavism by Prabhu Jagadbandhu and Mahagambhira Lila ===
Prabhu Jagadbandhu preached Krishnaism and Vaishnavism for 30 years. He asked people to chant the holy name of God (Radha Krishna and Gour Nitai), to develop Love for God. He urged everyone to love all people irrespective of caste and creed. This time period is referred to as the 'Maha Gambhira Lila' (in contrast to Chaitanya Mahaprabhu's Gambhira Lila).

=== Leadership of Sripad Mahendraji and formation of Mahanam Sampradaya ===
Sripad Mahendraji renounced the world at an early age of 20 years. He went to Vrindavan in search of Lord Krishna. later, he went to Sri Angan where Prabhu Jagadbandhu was at that time, in the small cottage.

Sripad Mahendraji decided to settle in Sri Angan and lead the life of an ashramite Brahmachari i.e. Living in a Ashram and follow Brahmacarya.

After few years, Prabhu jagadbandhu employed Sripad Mahendraji with a mission. Prabhu Jagadbandu asked Sripad Mahendraji to organise a band of selfless brahmacharies i.e. those who follow Brahmacarya. He asked Sripad Mahendraji to go with the band of brahmacharies from place to place and preach the 'Mahanam Sampradaya'.

Accordingly, a band of about 50 Sannyasins was assembled, who together founded the Mahanam Sampradaya under the leadership of Sripad Mahendraji.

Later Sripad Mahendraji made his disciple Dr. Mahanambrata Brahmachariji, the head of Mahanam Sampradaya.

== Mahanam Sampradaya under Mahanambrata Brahmachari ==
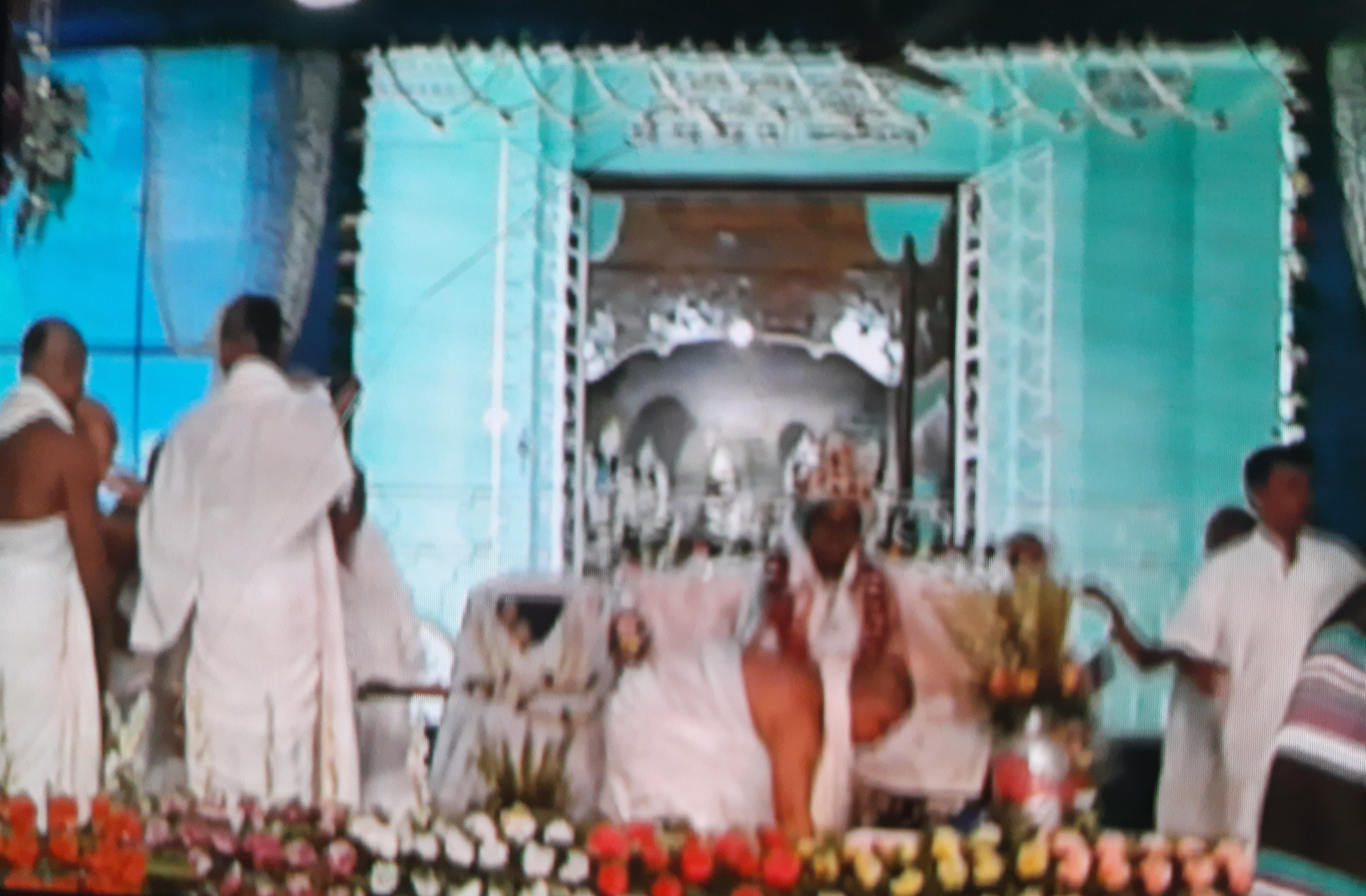
Mahanambrata Brahmachari's holy statue is being worshipped by his disciples at Mahanam Angan, Kolkata on the day of Guru Purnima.

After the formation of Mahanam Sampradaya, Sripad Mahendraji received letter of invitation for the 2nd parliament of world religion (or more commonly the world fellowship of faiths) in the year 1933.

Sripad Mahendraji sent Mahanambrata Brahmachari, a scholarly leader of Mahanam Sampradaya, as a delegate to Chicago, Illinois, U.S.A. to attend the conference.

After returning from Chicago and after the death of Sripad Mahendraji, Mahanambrata Brahmachari was made the head of Mahanam Sampradaya.

Under his guidance Mahanam Sampradaya developed further. Thus, 'Mahanam Sevak Sangha', a subsidiary of Mahanam Sampradaya was established for the non-ashramite followers. 'Mahanambrata Cultural and Welfare Trust', a publication was also initiated by Dr. Mahanambrata Brahmachariji.

== Mahanam Sampradaya in present ==
Mahanambrata Brahmachari the Head of Mahanam Sampradaya in India and the Head of Mahanam Sampradaya in Bangladesh allowed Nabanibandhu Brahmachari, Upasakbandhu Brahmachari, Kantibandhu Brahmachari and many more brahmacharies to carry forward the guru parampara and the spiritual lineage and allowed them to give mantra diksha to initiate as many devotees.

By the time Mahanambrata Brahmachari died in 1999, Bangladesh attained its liberation.

So, in 1999, Nabanibandhu Brahmachari became the Head of Mahanam Sampradaya in India and the Head of Mahanam Sampradaya in Bangladesh.

When Nabanibandhu Brahmachari died, Upasakbandhu Brahmachari became the Head of Mahanam Sampradaya in India and Kantibandhu Brahmachari became the Head of Mahanam Sampradaya in Bangladesh. Therefore, Upasakbandhu Brahmachari and Kantibandhu Brahmachari are the Head of Mahanam Sampradaya in India and Mahanam Sampradaya in Bangladesh respectively.

== Philosophy and Ideology of Mahanam Sampradaya ==
Mahanam Sampradaya is a new Krishnaite Vaishava denomination. It believes in attaining the five principals of Mansatvya or Humanity namely-

1.Achourya [also called Asteya] (Not to steal)

2.Ahimsa (Non-Violence)

3.Satya (to be truthful)

4. Samyama (Self-restraint)

5.shaucha (cleanliness of both inner self and body)

Dr. Mahanambrata Brahmachariji once said the following about Mahanam Sampradaya's philosophy called Manav Dharma -

The perfection of human life is in the attainment of humanity. In order to gain humanity, one has to achieve five Qualities. Ahimsa(Non-Violence), Samyama(Self-restraint), Shaucha(cleanliness), Achourya( non- thiefness), and Satya(truth). Do not envy anyone. Do not steal anyone's goods. Body and mind, Keep them holy. Always be self - restrained in moral character. Don't let untruth touch(influence) your deeds and words . As a human being, we have just one Dharma i.e. Attaining Manushatvya (Humanity). This same thing has been told by Prabhu Jagadbandhu in the form of a Sutra - " Ei Marma Ei Dharma" I advice all to become human beings after attaining Manushatvya (humanity) and also help others to become human. This is the best service to the people.

— Dr. Mahanambrata Brahmachariji

== Mahanam Mahakirtan ==
According to Mahanam Sampradaya, Mahanam Mahakirtan is a key aspect of their religious practice and cult. Mahanam literally means 'Great Name'. It generally refers to the following lines from Prabhu Jagadbandhu's book named 'Chandrapath'

Hari Purusha Jagadbandhu Maha Uddharana

Charihasta Chandraputra Hakitapatana

(Prabhu Prabhu Prabhu Hey) (Anantanantamaya)

— Prabhu Jagadbandhu, 'MAHANAM', Chandrapath

Mahakirtan means 'Great Kirtan and congregation chanting of the holy name of God.'

So, Mahanam Mahakirtan literary means congregation chanting of above mentioned Mahanam. Whereas, Mahanam Mahakirtan more generally refers to the ceaseless congregation chanting of Mahanam around the sandalwood casket placed first in Sri Angan but later moved to Mahendra Bandhu Angan, a prominent temple of Mahanam Sampradaya in Ghurni, Krishnanagar, West Bengal, India. The sandalwood casket called 'Shree Samput' preserves the holy body of Prabhu Jagadbandhu. Sripad Mahendraji and Mahanambrata Brahmachari and Mahanam Sampradaya believes that Prabhu Jagadbandhu will someday come out from the sandalwood casket after hearing the Mahanam Mahakirtan.

Mahanam Mahakirtan was started on 18 October 1921. Mahanam Mahakirtan is also known as Mahanam 'Yajna'.

== Social activities of Mahanam Sampradaya ==
Social activities of Mahanam Sampradaya are carried out by Mahanam Sevak Sangha, a subsidiary of Mahanam Sampradaya.

Since 1981, Mahanam Sampradaya has run a charitable dispensary (free except 1 INR for registration of each patient) named Sri Sri Prabhu Jagatbandhu Sevangan.

Free medical camps are organised every year by Mahanam Sampradaya on the event of Ganga Sagar mela, an annual fair for pilgrims at Southern part of Sagar Island of West Bengal, India. A few ambulances are also operated by Mahanam Sampradaya.

Mahanam Sampradaya also donate free blankets for the poor and needy people in the winter months. Mahanam Sampradaya runs two schools of their own and also provide free books for the needy and meritorious students.

== Temples of Mahanam Sampradaya ==
Mahanam Sampradaya has dozens of temples in India and Bangladesh. Some prominent temples are listed below.

| SL no. | Name of Temple | Location | Google plus code [for Google maps] |
|---|---|---|---|
| 1 | MAHENDRA BANDHU ANGAN | Ghurni, Krishnagar, West Bengal, India | --- |
| 2 | MAHAUDDHARANA MATH | Maniktala, Kolkata, West Bengal, India | H9JM+RH |
| 3 | MAHANAM ANGAN | Raghunathpur I, Kolkata, West Bengal, India | JC9J+9G |
| 4 | SRI SRI BANDHU KUNJ | Vrindavan, Uttar Pradesh, India | HPM3+94 |
| 5 | SRI SRI PRABHU JAGATBANDHU ASHRAM | Puri, Odisha, India | QRV7+7W |
| 6 | HARISABHA MANDIR | Nabadwip, West Bengal, India | C969+C7 |
| 7 | MAHANAM MATH | Nabadwip, West Bengal, India | --- |
| 8 | SRI SRI RADHAMADHAB - PRABHU JAGATBANDHU ASHRAM | Siliguri, West Bengal, India | PC6X+4C |
| 9 | SRI SRI MAHANAM ANGAN | Banamalipur, Agartala, Tripura, India | R8VW+F7 |
| 10 | SRI SRI JAGADBANDHU ASRAM | Subhashgram, West Bengal, India | CCCV+QG |
| 11 | SRI SRI DAHAPARA DHAM | Murshidabad, West Bengal, India | 57V3+5F |
| 12 | Sri Angan | Faridpur, Bangladesh | JP7W+73 |
| 13 | PRABHU JAGADBANDHU ASHRAM | Bakchar, Bangladesh | JP7W+73 |
| 14 | PRABHU JAGADBANDHU ASHRAM | Brahmankanda, Bangladesh | --- |

There are some more temples of Mahanam Sampradaya which are not included in the above list.

== See also ==
- Sri Angan
