= Golahat massacre =

Massacre in 1971

Golahat massacre গোলাহাট গণহত্যা
- Part of Bangladesh genocide
- Location: 25°48′21″N 88°52′58″E; Golahat, Nilphamari, Bangladesh
- Date: 13 June 1971; 10 a.m. (UTC+6:00)
- Target: Marwari Hindus
- Attack type: Mass murder, Massacre
- Weapons: Ram-daos, Bayonets
- Deaths: 437
- Perpetrators: Bihari Muslims, Pakistani Army

The Golahat massacre (Bengali: গোলাহাট গণহত্যা) was a massacre of 437 emigrating Hindu merchants and businessmen of Marwari ethnicity in Saidpur, East Pakistan on June 13, 1971.

== Background ==
Saidpur is a railway town and a commercial hub situated in the Nilphamari District of Rangpur division of Bangladesh. It is situated near Parbatipur, which was an important rail junction in undivided India, connecting the North East to the rest of the country. The Marwaris, attracted by the prospect of trade and commerce had settled in the town of Saidpur, long before the Partition of India. The Marwaris became a part of the local population and contributed to the society. In 1911, Tulsiram Agarwal had founded the Tulsiram Girls High School. Some of them had earned a respected position in the society because of their social work.

After the Partition of India, the Marwaris chose to stay back in East Pakistan rather than migrating to India. Thousands of Urdu-speaking Muslims from Bihar and the United Provinces settled in Saidpur. In 1971, the Urdu-speaking Muslims constituted 75% of the population of the city.

During the Bangladesh War of Independence, On 12 April, the Pakistan army killed prominent Marwari citizens Tulsiram Agarwal, Yamuna Prasad Kedia and Rameshwar Lal Agarwal at Nisbetganj. The killings created a panic in the Marwari community.

== Events ==
On 1 June, the Pakistan army took 185 Marwari men and transported them to Saidpur cantonment. Major Gul of the Pakistan army employed them in renovation of the Saidpur airbase and digging trenches for military purposes. A few days later, Major Gul stated that he would send them to India through the border outpost at Haldibari. Meanwhile, on 5 June, the Pakistan army announced that the Hindus of Saidpur would be provided a safe passage to India through the Chilahati border into the Jalpaiguri district of West Bengal.

On the morning of 13 June, at about 6 a.m., the 185 prisoners were brought to the Saidpur railway station in four military trucks. They were assured a safe passage to India and asked to bring their family and relatives. They rushed to their houses in the joy of freedom and soon returned with their families. The Pakistani soldiers and the Bihari Muslims segregated the crowd into men and women. A special train had arrived at the Saidpur railway station at 8 a.m. They were boarded into separate compartments, two each for the men and the women. The doors and the windows were locked from inside. While boarding, no less 20 married and unmarried women were detained by the Pakistani soldiers and later taken to the Saidpur cantonment.

At about 10 a.m. the special train commenced its journey towards India. Soon after the journey had commenced, the train abruptly came to a halt over a railway culvert in Golahat, a locality in the outskirts of the Saidpur town, two kilometres of the Saidpur railway station. The doors of the compartments were opened and Bihari Muslims, armed with shining ramdaos entered the compartments. The entire area was surrounded by the Pakistani military, armed with automatic weapons. The Bihari Muslims abused the Hindus, calling them malaun and stated that their lives were not even worthy of a bullet. The men, women and children were dragged out one by one. The Pakistani army and their collaborators bayoneted and butchered them to death. The children who were crying out of fear were either smashed on the railway tracks or flung into the air and then caught with bayonets.

There is some confusion regarding the number of people killed in the Golahat massacre. According to the Bangladesh Sangbad Sangstha and Prothom Alo, 437 Hindus were killed in the massacre. However, Sarmila Bose mentioned a figure of 338, quoting from an account of Dwarka Prasad Singhania, Marwari businessman of Saidpur. Only ten from those who boarded the train could escape. They ran towards Dinajpur and finally took shelter in India.

== Memorial ==
In 2010, Prajanma 71 and Saidpur Smaranika Parishad commemorated the martyrdom of the victims through puja and anjali at the mass killing site at Golahat. No memorial has been erected even after 40 years of the Liberation War. The relics of the massacre are being lost. Local land sharks have encroached upon the site of mass killing and started cultivation. Sumit Agarwala, the president of Saidpur Smaranika Parishad demanded a national memorial at the mass killing site.
