= Pomara massacre =

1971 killings in Chittagong District, East Pakistan

Coordinates: 22.47°N 92.01°E

Pomara massacre পোমরা গণহত্যা
- Part of Bangladesh genocide
- Location: Pomara, Chittagong District, East Pakistan
- Date: 14 September 1971 (UTC+6:00)
- Target: Bengali Hindus
- Attack type: Massacre
- Deaths: 13
- Injuries: 5
- Perpetrator: Pakistani Army

Pomara massacre (Bengali: পোমরা গণহত্যা; [pomra ɡɔɳɔɦɔt̪ːa]) refers to the live burial of 13 unarmed Bengali Hindus of Pomara Union, Chittagong District, East Pakistan on 14 September 1971 by the Pakistani Army.

== Background ==
The Pomara Union falls under the Rangunia Upazila of Chittagong District. The mass killing site is about 50 metres from the Gochra Chaumohani railway station and 25 km from Chittagong. It is situated behind the Pomara High School just beside the Pomara reserved forest.

== Killings ==
On 14 September a 50-60 strong contingent of the Pakistani Army attacked Madhuram Talukdarpara and launched an assault on the local Hindu men and women of all ages.

Eighteen (18) villagers were tied with ropes and then beaten and dragged to an army camp near the Pomra reserved forest. Hundreds of villagers accompanied them to the camp to secure their release from the army officers. The eldest five of the captives were released in grave condition. The rest were made to dig a grave, and were buried alive.

A few days later some locals attempted to exhume the corpses but gave up due to heavy stench. Soon the mass grave became covered with shrubs, and the area became a grazing ground for the cattle.

At present, seasonal vegetables are cultivated at the site.
