= Sri Angan =

Hindu temple in Bangladesh

Shree Angon
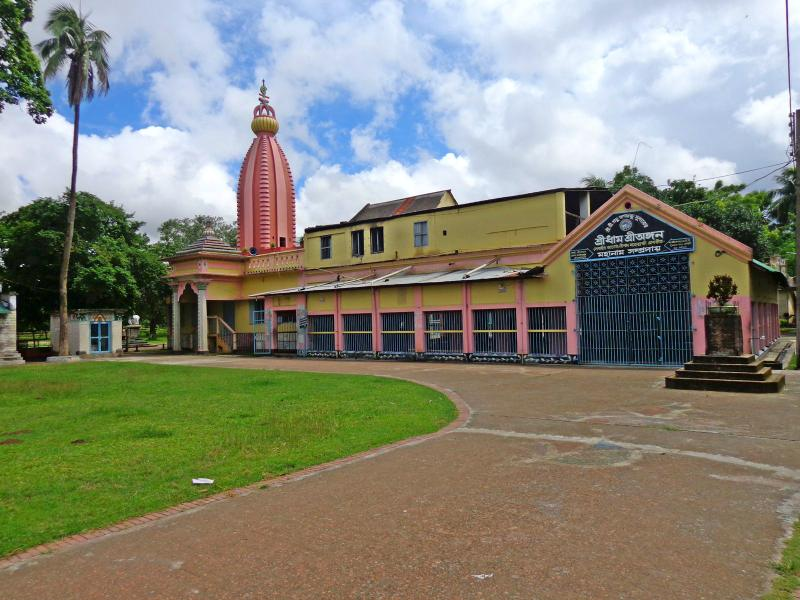
- Formation: 1899; 127 years ago
- Founder: Prabhu Jagadbandhu
- Headquarters: Faridpur, Bangladesh
- Region served: Worldwide

Sri Angan also known as Shree Angon is an Ashram set up by Prabhu Jagadbandhu the founder of Mahanam Sampradaya in Faridpur, Bengal Presidency, British India in 1899 C.E. This ashram is the headquarters of Mahanam Sampradaya in Bangladesh. During the Bangladesh Liberation War of 1971 the Pakistani Army killed 8 monks in the Ashram during the Sree Angan massacre while they were praying and damaged the ashram. Janmastami is celebrated with great religious fervour every year. A procession in honour of the Hindu God Krishna is taken through the town.
