= Sendia massacre =

1971 massacre by the Pakistan Army

Coordinates: 23.20°N 90.00°E

Sendia massacre সেনদিয়া হত্যাকান্ড
- Part of Bangladesh genocide
- Location: Sendia, Faridpur, East Pakistan
- Date: 20 May 1971 (UTC+6:00)
- Target: Bengali Hindus
- Attack type: Massacre
- Weapon: Light machine guns
- Deaths: 127
- Perpetrator: Pakistani army

Sendia massacre (Bengali: সেনদিয়া হত্যাকান্ড) was a massacre of 127 unarmed Bengali Hindus in Sendia village in undivided Faridpur district on 20 May 1971 by the Pakistani Army. 127 Bengali Hindu men, women and children were killed in the massacre. The killers did not spare even the pregnant women, children or the elderly people. 76 out of the dead were women.

== Background ==
At present, the village of Sendia falls under Khalia Union of Rajoir Upazila in Madaripur District under Dhaka Division. Sendia is just 24 kilometres (15 mi) from the Madaripur District headquarters. In 1971, Madaripur District was a sub-division under the undivided Faridpur District. At that time, there were very less motorable roads and hence the waterways constituted the main thoroughfares of the region. Steamers and country boats were the primary modes of transport. The region around Sendia in Rajoir Upazila was the birthplace of eminent Bengali Hindu political leaders of yore like Ambica Charan Mazumdar, Gour Chandra Bala, Phani Bhusan Majumdar among others. Historically, the present Rajoir Upazila had always been a Hindu majority region. During the Operation Searchlight, the Pakistani Army had set up an army camp at Tekerhat steamer station, in Rajoir Upazila.

== Killings ==
The date of the incident in various accounts is given as 5 Jaistha 1378 in the Bengali calendar, which is either 19 May or 20 May 1971 depending on whether it is the traditional Bengali calendar or standardized Bengali calendar. On the day of the incident at around 9 AM, a contingent of the Pakistani Army from the Tekerhat army camp, set out in a launch and got down at Bhennabari, presently under Gopalganj District. They started firing and arson at Char Chamta and proceeded through Kadambari Union under Madaripur District and resorted to a massacre at Ullabari. From there they proceeded towards Sendia, firing indiscriminately and committing arson along the way.

At around 4 PM, the Pakistani Army, along with their collaborators, arrived in Sendia. The Hindus from the nearby villages of Khalia, Palita and Chhatianbari villages took shelter the sugarcane fields in Sendia, after hearing gunshots. When the Pakistani Army entered Sendia, it was almost deserted. The Pakistani soldiers and their local collaborators looted the village and set it on fire. One elderly woman was burnt alive. The remaining villagers were taken captives, blind folded and hands tied, they were tortured to death at six different spots in the village. When the army contingent was about to leave, a goat's cry blew up the villagers cover in the sugarcane fields. The Pakistan Army opened fire from their semi-automatic weapons killing more than a hundred Bengali Hindus on the spot. Six days later five more persons were killed. Later, the survivors buried the dead bodies in six mass graves.

== Aftermath ==
A four-month-old child who survived the massacre while its parents had died was adopted by Father Marino Reagan, from a Christian mission located at Baniarchar, now in Gopalganj District. Reagan later took the child to the United States, where he raised him.

On 28 March 2010, a case was filed against BNP leader Moni Howlader, Mohammed Rafique Howlader, Sarwar Howlader, and a dozen unnamed armed Razakars at the Madaripur District Chief Judicial Magistrate Court. In the case file, the accused has been mentioned for their direct involvement in the Sendia massacre.

== Memorial ==
As of 2012, no initiatives were taken by the government to restore mass graves. Residential buildings have come up above two of the graves. The remaining four are also on the verge of destruction.
