= Syed Khwaja Khairuddin =

Pakistani politician

- Born: 4 July 1921; Dacca, Bengal, British India
- Died: 3 October 1993 (aged 72); Karachi, Sindh, Pakistan
- Education: Dhaka University
- Office: Vice Chairman of Dacca Municipality.
- Political party: Council Muslim League
- Children: Syed Khwaja Alqama
- Parents: Syed Khwaja Alauddin (father); Shahzadi Begum (mother)

Syed Khwaja Khairuddin (Urdu: سيد خواجہ خير الدين, Bengali: সৈয়দ খাজা খায়েরউদ্দিন) was a Pakistani politician. He was the vice mayor of Dhaka and was known for opposing the Independence of Bangladesh. Following Bangladesh's independence, he migrated to live in Pakistan.

== Early life ==
Khairuddin was born in Dhaka on 4 July 1921. His father was Syed Khwaja Alauddin and his mother was Shahzadi Begum. Syed Khwaja Alauddin was a leader of the Khilafat Movement along with his father, Syed Khwaja Wazir Ali. Wazir Ali's father, Syed Khwaja Muhammad Hassan, moved to Dhaka from Patna in the 1800s. Shahzadi Begum was a great-granddaughter of Nawab Khwaja Alimullah of Dhaka and grand-niece of Khwaja Abdul Ghani (second Nawab of Dhaka). Khairuddin had a brother, Khwaja Mohiuddin (Ladla Mia), and a sister, Farhadi Begum. He studied at the Government Muslim High School in Dhaka and graduated from the University of Dhaka in 1943.

== Career ==
He became the President of East Pakistan Council Muslim League. He served as the vice chairman of Dhaka Municipality. He was elected MPA in the years 1962–65 and was also elected MNA in the year 1965. He was a polling agent of Fatima Jinnah in Dhaka for the 1965 Pakistani presidential election which she contested for against President Ayub Khan. He was accused in the National Assembly of Pakistan for political bias in appointing personnel during his tenure as mayor. He was the convenor and chairman of East Pakistan Central Peace Committee. The committee faced accusations of war crimes and one of its founders, Ghulam Azam, was convicted of war crimes. Khairuddin moved to Pakistan after the independence of Bangladesh in 1971. After migrating to Pakistan, he served as Secretary General of the Movement for the Restoration of Democracy (MRD) which was an alliance of eight parties against President Muhammad Zia-ul-Haq. Khairuddin was also a Senior Vice President of the Pakistan Muslim League. He was deported by Zulfikar Ali Bhutto for campaigning against the Unification of Pakistan. He was awarded a Sitara-e-Khidmat by Ayub Khan in 1963 and also awarded a gold medal by Prime Minister Nawaz Sharif for his role during the Pakistan Movement.

== Death ==
Syed Khwaja Khairuddin died in Karachi on 3 October 3, 1993. His wife, Begum Hasina Khairuddin, died in Karachi on 27 April 2010.

== Personal life and legacy ==
Khairuddin was married to Begum Hasina Khairuddin, daughter of his fourth-cousin Khwaja M. Alim (great-great-grandson of Nawab Khwaja Alimullah of Dhaka). Khwaja M. Alim and his father, Khwaja Abdul Karim, were leaders of the Khilafat Movement (similar to Khairuddin's father and grandfather). The couple had three sons: Syed Khwaja Salman, Dr. Syed Khwaja Alqama, Syed Khwaja Maaz, and three daughters: Seema, Fariyal, and Tazeen.

Salman is a senior leader of the Pakistan Muslim Alliance, a political party that represents the Bengali community in Pakistan. Maaz is a banker who worked for many years in the Bank of Credit and Commerce International. He was a favorite of the bank's founder Agha Hasan Abedi and was referred to as the "blue-eyed boy" of Abedi. Maaz was posted in the bank's Dhaka branch out of preference for his home city. Dr. Syed Khwaja Alqama is the former vice-chancellor of Bahauddin Zakariya University. He was nominated to be Pakistan's High Commissioner to Bangladesh, but the Government of Bangladesh (then led by Sheikh Hasina) declined to accept his nomination. He is currently the Dean of the Faculty of Social Sciences and Humanities at Minhaj University Lahore.
