= Dakra massacre =

Hindu temple in South Asia 21 May 1971

Coordinates: 22.546°N 89.698°E

Dakra massacre ডাকরা গণহত্যা
- Part of Bangladesh genocide
- Location: Dakra, Khulna, East Pakistan (now Bangladesh)
- Date: 21 May 1971 (UTC+6:00)
- Target: Bengali Hindus
- Attack type: Massacre
- Weapon: Rifles
- Deaths: 646
- Perpetrators: Peace Committee, Razakars

Dakra massacre (Bengali: ডাকরা গণহত্যা) refers to the massacre of unarmed Hindu refugees at the village of Dakra, in the Bagerhat sub-division of Khulna District on 21 May 1971 by the Peace Committee members and the Razakars. The attackers were led by Rajab Ali Fakir, the chairman of the Bagerhat sub-divisional Peace Committee. It is alleged that 646 men, women and children were killed in the massacre.

== Background ==
The village of Dakra is located in Perikhali Union under Rampal Upazila of Bagerhat District in Khulna Division of Bangladesh. In 1971, Bagerhat District was a sub-division within the Khulna District. Dakra is located on the south bank of the Mongla river, which flows towards the west and falls into the Pasur river near Mongla port. On the north bank of Mongla river, exactly opposite Dakra, lies the Krishnaganj market under Banshtali Union. Dakra was a predominantly Hindu village, having a famous Kali temple. In Dakra lived Badal Chakraborty also known as Noa Thakur, a spiritual person respected by all.

After the launch of Operation Searchlight, Peace Committee and Razakar force was organized in Khulna. In April, the Razakars began to persecute the Hindus and loot their properties. By the middle of May, thousands of Hindus from Pirojpur, Jhalokathi, Barguna and Barisal Sadar sub-divisions of undivided Barisal district and Bagerhat sub-division of undivided Khulna district began to use Dakra as the transit, while fleeing to India. On 21 May, an estimated 10,000 Hindu refugees were stranded in Dakra.

=== Killings ===
In the afternoon, a group of 15-20 Razakars under the leadership of Rajab Ali arrived in Dakra in two boats. The first boat crossed the Kaliganj market and proceeded towards Madartali canal. The second boat proceeded along the Kumarkhali canal and then made a sudden turn towards Dakra along the Madartali canal. The Razakars from the second boat got down and started firing at the crowd. In the meanwhile, the Razakars from the first boat too got down and proceeded to the Kali temple, firing indiscriminately at the crowd. The crowd started running for cover. Many jumped to the river and were shot at. More than 150 persons were shot in the river. The Razakars resorts to loot, arson and rape in the villages.

Survivors including Dayanand Mandal Dutta of Dakra village, who hid in the houses of Bengali Muslims neighbours until he escaped to India.

== Trial ==
The government of Bangladesh brought war crime charges against Jamaat-e-Islami leader AKM Yusuf at the International Crimes Tribunal. Yusuf has been charged with genocide of the Bengali Hindu people and has been held directly responsible for the Dakra massacre.

== Memorial ==
No memorial has been built in Dakra to commemorate the victims. In 2010, Dakra Ganahatya Smriti Sangrakshan Parishad held a program to commemorate the victims of the Dakra massacre.
