= Prabhu Jagadbandhu =

Bengal Vaishnava religious leader

Sri Sri Prabhu Jagadbandhu Sundar
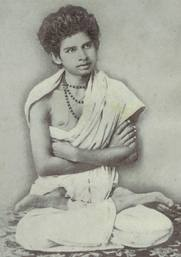

Personal life
- Born: 28 April 1871 Murshidabad, Bengal Presidency, British India
- Died: 17 September 1921 (aged 50) Faridpur, Bengal Presidency, British India
- Notable work(s): Sangkirtan Padamrta and other Kirtan songs

Religious life
- Religion: Hinduism
- Founder of: Mahanam Sampradaya
- Philosophy: Bhakti Yoga

Prabhu Jagadbandhu was a Hindu religious person from Bengal. He spent much of his life meditating and preaching at the Sri Angan ashram in modern India and Bangladesh. His teachings inspired the founding of a Krishnaite Hindu revival movement in the last decade of the 19th century and later on Mahanam Sampradaya, a monastic organisation. His devotees equate him with and also believes that he is Krishna and Chaitanya Mahaprabhu.

== Early life ==
In April 1871 (16th Baishakh, 1278 BS), Prabhu Jagadbandhu was born in the village of Dahapara in the Murshidabad district, within the Bengal Presidency of British India. His father, Dinanauth Chakravarty Nyayratna, was a Brahmin scholar. Dinanauth held the honorific title of ‘Nyayratna’ and made significant contributions to the region's scholarly heritage through his teaching. His mother’s name was Bamadevi.

Prabhu Jagadbandhu spent his childhood in a Vaishnava family in Gobindapur, Faridpur. His formal schooling began at the local Banga Vidyalaya. He subsequently studied up to the third grade at Faridpur High School. Later, after a brief stint at Ranchi H.E. School and finally continuing his studies up to the first grade at Pabna Zilla School, his formal institutional education concluded at the age of approximately sixteen. Under the direct tutelage of his father, he studied Sanskrit grammar, Nyaya Shastra (logic), and major Vaishnava scriptures such as the Bhagavata Purana. When their ancestral homestead was lost to riverbank erosion by the Padma, Prabhu Jagadbandhu, then approximately twelve years old, relocated to Brahmankanda village and subsequently to the Pabna region. During his stay in Pabna, at around the age of sixteen, he used to spend long periods beneath a Keli-Kadamba tree.

== Life and teachings ==
Prabhu Jagadbandhu was born on 28 April 1871 in Murshidabad, Bengal Presidency, British India, to the family of a Sanskrit scholar. His birthday, on Sita Navami, is celebrated as Bandhu Navami. He was devout and always sung Kirtans to Krishna and Chaitanya Mahaprabhu.

Prabhu Jagadbandu summarised his teachings:

Show kindness and compassion and do well to all people. Make a free gift of religion to all. Initiation in the hallowed name of Hari is the sure means of attaining salvation (i.e; deliverance from all agonies and sufferings). This is the secret of salvation. This is the secret of eternal good done to others.

— Prabhu Jagadbandu

Prabhu Jagadbandu composed eight books on the worship of God through kirtan: Shrimatisangkirtan, Shrimansangkirtan, Bibidhasabgit (the first three were printed together under the title of Sangkirtan Padamrta), Shrisangkirtan, Padavali, Shrishriharikatha, Chandrapath, Trikal, and Uddharana.

Prabhu Jagadbandu died on 17 September 1921 in Faridpur, Bengal Presidency, British India near the Sri Angan ashram. His remains are worshipped through the sandalwood casket that preserves his holy body. All of his followers believes that he will someday come out from the sandalwood casket after hearing the Mahanam Mahakirtan.

Prabhu Jagatbandhu College in Howrah, West Bengal, India, is named after him.

== See also ==
- Mahanambrata Brahmachari
