= Kaminisundari Devi =

Bengali writer

Kaminisundari Devi was an Indian playwright and author in Bengali language who wrote Urbashi in 1856.
