= Ketnar Bil massacre =

Coordinates: 22.97°N 90.15°E

Ketnar Bil massacre কেতনার বিল গণহত্যা
- Part of Bangladesh genocide
- Location: Ketnar Bil, Barisal, East Pakistan
- Date: May 15, 1971; 55 years ago (UTC+6:00)
- Target: Bengali Hindus
- Attack type: Massacre
- Weapon: Light machine guns
- Deaths: More than 500
- Perpetrator: Pakistani Army

Ketnar Bil massacre (Bengali: কেতনার বিল গণহত্যা) refers to the massacre of more than 500 unarmed Bengali Hindus in Ketnar Bil region of Barisal District by the Pakistan Army on 15 May 1971.

== Background ==
Ketnar Bil is an open land in Barisal District where paddy and jute are cultivated. In Bengali, a bil is a stagnant water body formed out of river movement, usually a horse shoe lake. Bils accumulate sediments over the years and are gradually converted into arable land. In 1971, Ketnar Bil fell under the Gaurnadi police station of the then Sadar sub-division of the undivided Barisal district. Now the area falls under Agailjhara Upazila of Barisal District.

The "bil" is located to the north of Rangta village under Rajahir Union in between the Hindu inhabited villages of Bakal and Kodaldhowa. The village of Bakal was originally known as Bakai, however due to illegibility of the dot of 'i', the Pakistani Army pronounced and subsequently spelt it as Bakal. On 25 April, the Pakistani Army arrived in Gournadi through the Dhaka - Barisal Highway. In Gournadi, eight Pakistani soldiers were killed by the freedom fighters. The enraged Pakistani Army contingent began to fire indiscriminately. More than 200 villagers were killed. They set fire to the harbour and hundreds of houses adjacent to it. In early May, the Pakistani Army set up a permanent camp at the Gaurnadi College.

Around 250 soldiers and 50 local collaborators began to stay at the camp. They set up bunkers at the bridges in Batajor, Bhurghata, Mahilara, Ashokkathi, and Kasba in Gaurnadi police station area. They established control up to Bhurghata in the north, Shikarpur (Wazirpur police station) in the south, Paisarhat (Agailajhara police station) in the west, and Muladi to the east. The local collaborators and Peace Committee member acted as accomplices to the acts of killing, loot and rape by the Pakistani Army.

== Killings ==
On 14 May, locals under the leadership of one Chitta Ballabh, attacked an army patrol from the front with spears and shields killing four soldiers in Donarkandi. Enraged by this attack, the next day at around 10 am, a contingent of around 100 Pakistani soldiers, proceeded towards the west past Kasba and Chandshi. They fired indiscriminately at everyone they met. As the news of army arrival spread, thousands of villagers from nearby seven to eight villages began to run towards the Ketnar Bil to take shelter behind the paddy and jute fields. When the army contingent arrived at Rangta, they found the villagers running towards the wasteland. The Pakistani Army open machine gun fire at the running crowd. More than five hundred people were killed in the incident. The army then set hundreds of deserted houses on fire, killing cattle and other livestock. A twelve-day-old infant was stamped to death. Another child was bayoneted to death. The local collaborators and Peace Committee member acted at accomplice to the acts of killing.

19 persons of the local Patra family were killed in the massacre. The survivors of the Patra family buried around 150 dead bodies including those of their family members in five or six mass graves within the Patra residence. The rest of the dead bodies decomposed in the Ketnar Bil and were eaten by animals.

== Memorial ==
No memorial has been built in the area in the memory of the victims. In 2011, Deputy Command A. R. Sarniabat of Muktijoddha Sangsad visited Ketnar Bil and designated it as the largest mass killing site in southern Bangladesh.
