= Demra massacre =

Massacre of Bengali Hindus during the Bangladesh Liberation War (13 May 1971)

Demra massacre ডেমরা গণহত্যা
- Part of Bangladesh genocide
- Location: Demra, Pabna, East Pakistan
- Date: 13 May 1971 (UTC+6:00)
- Target: Bengali Hindus
- Attack type: Mass murder, mass rape
- Weapon: Light machine guns
- Deaths: 800–900
- Perpetrators: Pakistani Army; Razakars

Demra massacre (Bengali: ডেমরা গণহত্যা) in Bangladesh was the massacre of unarmed Hindu residents of the villages under Demra Union in present-day Faridpur Upazila in Pabna District by the Pakistan Army aided by local collaborators on 13 May 1971. It is estimated that 800–900 people were killed in a single day. Rape and plunder were also carried out and temples, schools and houses were set on fire.

== Background ==
When the Pakistani army spread out from Dhaka towards the districts as a part of the Operation Searchlight, the people began to flee their homes. The Hindus began to flee Bangladesh and take refuge in neighbouring India. On their way, they had taken shelter in the remote village of Baushgari in Demra union.

== Events ==
The Pakistani army led by the local collaborators entered the area through the Boral river and then cordoned off the Baushgari and Rupsi villages. One collaborator named Asad led the Pakistani troops to the Baushgari village. In the nightfall, the men were dragged out of their houses and made to stand in a line while the women were raped in front of them by the Pakistani troops with the help of the collaborators. After that, both the men and women were shot to death and their houses were set on fire. A few survivors interred the charred remains of the bodies in a mass grave the next morning. Around 350 Hindus were killed in Baushgari village.

== Investigation ==
An 11-member team from the International Crimes Tribunal investigated the Demra massacre in 2010. The team was led by Sayed Rejaur Rahman, one of the prosecutors of the tribunal. The investigators visited the killing spots in Baushgari village and interviewed the witnesses to the war crimes. In their investigation, they found Motiur Rahman Nizami guilty of masterminding the massacre. Nizami was convicted and executed by hanging in 2016.
