= Makalkandi massacre =

Bangladesh 18 August 1971

Makalkandi massacre মাকালকান্দি হত্যাকান্ড
- Part of Bangladesh genocide
- Location: Makalkandi, Habiganj, Sylhet, East Pakistan
- Date: 18 August 1971; 9 a.m. (UTC+6:00)
- Target: Bengali Hindus
- Attack type: Burst fire, mass murder, massacre
- Weapon: Machine guns
- Deaths: More than 100
- Injuries: 40
- Perpetrators: Pakistani Army, Razakars

Makalkandi massacre (Bengali: মাকালকান্দি হত্যাকান্ড) was a massacre of over 40 Bengali Hindus of the Makalkandi village in the Habiganj Sub-division of undivided Sylhet district of East Pakistan by the Pakistani army on 18 August 1971.

== Background ==
Makalkandi village is located in the Baniachang Upazila of Habiganj District of Sylhet Division in present-day Bangladesh. In 1971, Habiganj was a sub-division in the Sylhet district and Baniachang was the largest village in Asia. To the north west of Baniachang is a haor encompassing a landmass 7 miles from north to south and 5 miles in east west, comprising an area of approximately 35 square miles. Within the landmass lay the village of Makalkandi, a Hindu village with a population of around 1,500. Though it had one only primary school, the literacy rate was as high as 35%. There were doctors, engineers and professors from this village. It was an economically prosperous village. There was not a single thatched hut in the village.

During the Liberation War, the residents of Makalkandi felt themselves safe in their village which was surrounded on all the sides by the haor acting as a natural fortification. Therefore, they did not leave for India. Even local M.P.A. Gopal Krishna Maharatna sent his family to Makalkandi for safety. Many Hindus from the neighbouring villages also took refuge in Makalkandi. However, Syed Fazlul Haque of Baniachang village joined the Razakars and collaborated with the Pakistani army. On 17 August a meeting was held between the Pakistani army and the collaborators, where Haque instigated the Pakistani army to attack Makalkandi.

== Events ==
On 18 August, very early in the morning, a contingent of the Pakistani army led by Major Durrani proceeded towards Makalkandi in boats. He was accompanied by police officer Zainal Abedin and local Syed Fazlul Haque. At around 9 a.m. they reached the village of Makalkandi. It was the day of Vishahari Puja. The villagers were making arrangements for the puja. In the century-old Chandi mandap in the western part of the village, the devotees were washing and polishing the brass images. Young children were collecting flowers for worship. Suddenly, the Pakistani soldiers opened fire from the boats. The villagers ran wherever they could. Many of them dived into the Suta river. The Pakistani army alighted from the boats and went towards the Chandi mandapa. They caught hold of twelve villagers and made them stand in a line in front from the Chandi mandap. Eleven were shot to death, while the twelfth Kangsa Mohan Das survived the massacre with four bullet wounds. Subsequently, the Pakistani army combed the entire village and shot dead scores of people. The bodies were disposed of in the Suta river. Around 40 persons managed to escape with injuries. Though they succeeded in reaching India, the majority of them succumbed to their injuries. Women were raped and the entire village was looted by the Razakars. The entire village was doused with petrol and set on fire.

== Memorial ==
In 2008, Nure Alam Siddiqui, the then Upazila Nirbahi Officer of Habiganj Upazila set up a memorial on the 37th anniversary of the massacre. The memorial lists the names of 78 victims who died in the massacre.
