= Karai Kadipur massacre =

Coordinates: 25.088°N 89.062°E

Karai Kadipur massacre কড়ই কাদিপুর গণহত্যা
- Part of Bangladesh genocide
- Location: Karai Kadipur, Joypurhat, East Pakistan
- Date: 26 April 1971 (UTC+6:00)
- Target: Bengali Hindus
- Attack type: Mass murder, Massacre
- Weapon: Light Machine Guns
- Deaths: 370
- Perpetrators: Pakistani Army, Razakars

Karai Kadipur massacre (Bengali: কড়ই কাদিপুর গণহত্যা) was the massacre of unarmed Hindu villagers of Joypurhat on 26 April 1971 by the Pakistani army and the Razakars. 370 Hindus were killed in the massacre in the villages of Karai, Kadipur and other adjoining villages.

== Background ==
In 1971, the twin villages of Karai and Kadipur were under Joypurhat sub-division of Rajshahi district, now under Bambu Union of Joypurhat Sadar Upazila in Joypurhat district bordering India. The two villages were predominantly Hindu inhabited mostly by the people from Kumbhakar caste.

== Events ==
On the night of 24 April, the Pakistani army arrived from Santahar by train and entered the sub-divisional town of Joypurhat. From the morning of 25 April, the Pakistani army began killing of the civilians and engaged in loot and arson. The people of Joypurhat began to flee to the country side. On 26 April, the army aided by the collaborators targeted the Hindu dominated villages of Karai and Kadipur. They encircled the villages and took the Hindu men in their captivity. The men were made to stand in a line and burst fired using light machine guns.

== Memorial ==
No memorial has been built so far in the memory of the victims. The Bangladesh government had acquired three decimals of land to build a memorial in the late nineties, however the memorial is yet to be built.

== List of persons killed ==
No initiative from the government has been taken so far in preparing a comprehensive list of the victims of the massacre. The partial list includes the following names.

- Dr. Krishna Chandra Barman
- Gopinath Pal
- Bhupen Pal
- Kshitish Chandra Pal
- Chhedra Barman
- Mahindra Chandra Barman
- Tarmuja Barman
- Subal Chandra Barman
- Ashwini Chandra Pal
- Jatish Pal
- Kancha Pal
- Mahabharat Pal
- Girish Chandra
- Rajen Chandra
