= Hasamdia massacre =

Coordinates: 23.39°N 89.74°E

Hasamdia massacre হাসামদিয়া গণহত্যা
- Part of Bangladesh genocide
- Location: Boalmari, Faridpur, East Pakistan
- Date: 16 May 1971 (UTC+6:00)
- Target: Bengali Hindus
- Weapons: Light machine guns, semi-automatic rifles
- Deaths: 33
- Perpetrators: Pakistan Army, Razakars

Hasamdia massacre (Bengali: হাসামদিয়া গণহত্যা) was the massacre of 33 unarmed Bengali Hindus in the Hasamdia village and nearby areas of the Faridpur District of East Pakistan on 16 May 1971 by the Pakistan Armed Forces. 33 persons were killed in the massacre. On 21 January 2013, the International Crimes Tribunal adjudged Abul Kalam Azad guilty of genocide for his involvement in the massacre and sentenced to death.

== Background ==
Hasamdia village falls under Chatul Union of Boalmari Upazila in Faridpur District. It is located six kilometers to the east of Boalmari railway station. In 1971, Hasamdia and the nearby villages of Moyendia, Rajapur, Srinagar, Poail and Ramnagar had some Hindu population.

== Killings ==
On 16 May 1971, a contingent of the Pakistan Armed Forces led Major Newaz arrived at the Boalmari railway station from Jessore cantonment. They raided the ancestral residence of Shah Mohammad Abu Zafar. Zafar was the leader of Mujib Bahini and the organizer of liberation struggle in the area, but he was not there at the moment. After failing to get hold of Zafar, the military in collaboration with Abul Kalam Azad raided the Hindu houses in Hasamdia, Rajapur, Ramnagar, Poail, Srinagar and Moyendia villages and rounded up 33 persons including 32 Bengali Hindus. The captives were taken to the Ramnagar village where they were executed. They also set fire to the Hasamdia market.

== Aftermath ==
After the liberation of Bangladesh, the victim's next to kin were compensated with BDT 2,000 each. However, the victims were not officially recognized by the state. In 2013, a memorial has been built in memory of the victims at the Shah Zafar Technical College.
