= Ishangopalpur massacre =

1971 massacre of Bengali Hindus

Coordinates: 23.636°N 89.779°E

Ishangopalpur massacre ঈশানগোপালপুর গণহত্যা
- Part of Bangladesh genocide
- Location: Ishangopalpur, Faridpur, East Pakistan
- Date: 2 May 1971 (UTC+6:00)
- Target: Bengali Hindus
- Weapons: Light machine guns, semi-automatic rifles
- Deaths: 28
- Perpetrators: Pakistani Army, Razakars

Ishangopalpur massacre (Bengali: ঈশানগোপালপুর গণহত্যা) refers to the massacre of Bengali Hindus in Ishangopalpur village, in the outskirts of Faridpur on 2 May 1971. The Pakistani Army shot and bayoneted 28 Bengali Hindus to death.

== Background ==
On 25 March 1971, the Pakistani Army launched Operation Searchlight in East Pakistan. They targeted Hindus as a community for extermination. After a few weeks, they arrived at Faridpur and set up an army base. In the meanwhile, the Hindus of the locality had begun to flee. Around 60 Bengali Hindu families from Faridpur took shelter in Ishangopalpur, a village located six to seven kilometers from the town. The house of former Hindu landlord Ishan Sarkar was located in the village. His grandson Lakshman Sen was staying at the house at that time. After 21 April, NAP leader Chittaranjan Ghosh, his elder brother Jagadish Chandra Ghosh along with a few influential persons from the Bengali Hindu community took shelter in the house. Some began to train themselves to fight the Pakistani Army.

== Killings ==
On 2 May, local people led a contingent of the Pakistani army towards the village. They proceeded to the house of Ishan Sarkar. As the residents attempted to flee, they were caught at gunpoint. 29 inmates of the house were rounded up and led to the banks of a pond nearby. They were kicked, punched and bayoneted. Then the adult males were killed one by one in front of their wives and children. Before leaving, the Pakistani soldiers warned in Urdu that no freedom fighter or Hindus would be spared. One person survived after escaping with a bullet wound. The dead were buried beside the pond.

== Aftermath ==
After the independence of Bangladesh, the mass killing site remained unchanged. In 2010, family members of the victims erected a memorial at the mass killing site. On 2 May 2010, the victims were commemorated and verses from the Gita were recited for the peace of the departed souls.
