= Al-Shams (East Pakistan) =

Paramilitary force

- Bengali: আল-শামস; Urdu: الشمس
- Leader: Fazlul Quader Chowdhury
- Founded: March 1971
- Dissolved: December 16, 1971
- Country: Pakistan
- Allegiance: Jamaat-e-Islami Pakistan: East Pakistan wing; Military junta of Pakistan
- Headquarters: East Pakistan
- Ideology: Anti-Bengali sentiment; Anti-Hindu sentiment; Religious persecution; State terrorism; Democide
- Political position: Far-right
- Status: Inactive
- Wars: Bangladesh War of Independence

The Al-Shams (Bengali: আল-শামস; Urdu: الشمس; lit. 'The sun') was a collaborationist paramilitary wing allied with several Islamist parties in East Pakistan, comprising both local Bengalis and Muhajirs. Alongside the Pakistan Army and Al-Badr, Al-Shams has been accused of participating in widespread atrocities against Bengali nationalists, civilians, and religious and ethnic minorities during the 1971 war. Following the war, the government of Bangladesh officially banned the group.

== Naming and inspirations ==
Al-Shams is an Arabic word meaning 'The Sun' and also the name of a Surah in the Quran, Surat Ash-Shams. Al Shams and Al-Badr were local Bengali and Bihari armed groups formed by the Pakistan Army.

== Background ==
On 25 March 1971, after Operation Searchlight, the exiled leadership of what is now Bangladesh declared independence from Pakistan and armed campaign against the Pakistan Army began. This struggle was spearheaded by elements of Mukti Bahini with strong support from India. As most of the locals were in support of Mukti Bahini and those who were not were killed by Mukti Bahini, the Pakistan Army, composed largely of elements from Punjab, found itself and its cause pretty much alienated from the local populace.

To counter this situation, the Pakistan Army accepted help from political parties, proclaiming Jihad against Indians, to seek unity among the population for the two wings of Pakistan. The PPP played an active role in its formation. It also recruited from the Urdu speaking Bihari population of East-Pakistan. This was between the Pakistan Army and the pro-independence forces and their supporters (Indians and Mukti Bahini). To recruit the local populace into fighting the independence movement, two sister organisations Al Badr (literally meaning The Moon, but also has a reference to the famous Battle of Badr) and Al Shams were formed.

== Genocide ==
The Al-Shams guarded infrastructure and provided logistics and intelligence support to the army. It also arrested suspects and transported them to interrogation centres that used torture. It carried out looting, rape and violence on the civilian population.

According to witnesses before the International Crimes Tribunal, the Al Shams was under the command of Fazlul Quader Chowdhury and led on the ground by his son Salauddin Quader Chowdhury in Chittagong. The other important members were former M.P. Syed Wahidul Alam of Bangladesh Nationalist Party and Saifuddin Quader Chowdhury, the younger brother of Salauddin Quader Chowdhury. They used to patrol the neighbourhoods of Satkania, Rauzan, Boalkhali, Patia and Rangunia in a jeep. They would set fire to Hindu houses and arrest anybody they suspected of being supportive towards the Mukti Bahini. The suspects were taken to Salauddin Quader Chowdhury's residence Goods Hill, which had been converted to a torture cell, where they were tortured and killed. Their bodies were disposed of in the Karnafuli.

On 12 December, the Al Shams and the Al Badr leadership jointly prepared the blueprint for killing the intellectuals. The Al Shams and Al Badar leadership met with Major General Rao Farman Ali and finalised the blueprint.

== Abolition ==
The general surrender of 16 December 1971 resulted in almost all armed resistance from the Pakistan and pro-Pakistan side and the two organisations ceasing to exist.

== See also ==
- List of massacres in Bangladesh
  - Persecution of Biharis in Bangladesh
  - Persecution of Buddhists in Bangladesh
  - Persecution of Hindus in Bangladesh
  - Persecution of Christians in Bangladesh
  - Persecution of atheists and secularists in Bangladesh
