= East Pakistan Central Peace Committee =

East Pakistani committee

East Pakistan Central Peace Committee: Bengali: পূর্ব পাকিস্তান কেন্দ্রীয় শান্তি কমিটি
- Abbreviation: PPKSC (Bengali); EPCPC (English)
- President: Syed Khwaja Khairuddin
- Chairperson: Farid Ahmad
- Founder: 12 people, including Tikka Khan and Ghulam Azam
- Founded: April 10, 1971; 55 years ago
- Dissolved: December 16, 1971; 54 years ago
- Headquarters: Dacca, East Pakistan
- Membership (April 1971): 140
- Ideology: Anti-Bengali sentiment; Anti-Hindu sentiment; State terrorism; Democide
- Political position: Far-right
- National affiliation: Pakistan Armed Forces; Razakars; Jamaat-e-Islami; Al-Badr; Al-Shams

East Pakistan Central Peace Committee (Note: (Bengali: পূর্ব পাকিস্তান কেন্দ্রীয় শান্তি কমিটি, romanized: Purbo Pakistan Kendrio Shanti Committee; Urdu: مشرقی پاکستان مرکزی امن کمیٹی), also known as the Nagorik Shanti Committee (Citizen's Peace Committee), or more commonly Peace Committee or Shanti Committee, founded as the Dhaka Nagorik Committee (Bengali: ঢাকা নাগরিক কমিটি, lit. 'Dhaka Citizens Committee')) was one of several committees formed in East Pakistan in 1971 to aid efforts of Pakistani forces during the Bangladesh War of Independence. Nurul Amin, as a leader of Pakistan Democratic Party, led the formation of the Shanti Committee to thwart the Mukti Bahini, which fought for independence of the region.

== Background ==
On 25 March 1971, the war in East Pakistan began. On 4 April 1971, twelve pro-Pakistan leaders, including Nurul Amin, Ghulam Azam and Khwaja Khairuddin, met General Tikka Khan of the Pakistan Army and assured him of co-operation in opposing the Bengali rebellion. After subsequent meetings, they announced the formation of Citizen Peace Committee, with 140 members. The first recruits included 96 Jamaat-e-Islami members, who started training in an Ansar camp at Khanjahan Ali Road, Khulna. The Shanti Committee also recruited Razakars.

== History ==
The leaders of the East Pakistan Central Peace Committee called on citizens of Pakistan to defend Pakistan from "Indian aggression", as India was accused of supporting the Bangladeshi liberation movement. The Peace Committee organised a rally from Baitul Mukarram to Chawkbazar Mosque on 13 April. The rally was to end with a meeting near New Market, Dhaka. At the end of the rally, riots began in Azimpur, Shantinagar and Shankhari Bazar areas, fire was set to houses of Bengalis and some were killed.

The Peace Committee spread throughout East Pakistan, reaching even rural villages. Compared to the indiscriminate killing of Pakistan Army, the Peace Committee were more specific and guided by lists, they made of opponents. The members of Peace Committee were feared and hated by the population of East Pakistan. Peace committee members were killed during the war.

On 14 April, at a meeting in Dhaka, the Citizen Peace Committee renamed itself as the East Pakistan Central Peace Committee. A working committee was formed consisting of 21 members. They set up an office in Maghbazar. The Peace Committee appointed one or more liaison officers for the different police station areas of Dhaka. On 17 April 1971, the members of the peace committee apprised Governor Tikka Khan of the progress made by them toward restoring normalcy and confidence among the citizens. The central peace committee was being deputed to the district and divisional headquarters throughout east Pakistan. When Pakistani troops arrived in Munshiganj, south of the capital, on 9 May 1971, they were warmly received by the local peace committee and other residents.

According to the historian Azadur Rahman Chandan in his 2011 book about the war, the Peace Committee was the first organisation to be set up by local residents who collaborated with Pakistan. Its members were drawn from the Muslim League, Jamaat-e-Islami, which thought an independent Bangladesh was against Islam; as well as the Urdu-speaking Biharis.

== Tasks ==
- This was a pro-Pakistan local militia formed during the 1971 Bangladesh Liberation War.
- They collaborated with the Pakistan Army to suppress the Bengali nationalist movement.
- Members of this committee were involved in:
  - Targeted killings of Bengali nationalists and intellectuals.
  - Supporting the Pakistan Army in atrocities, including massacres and widespread rape.
  - Instigating violence and terrorizing Bengali civilians.
- They earned a notorious reputation for betrayal and brutality against the Bengali population.

== Abolition ==
On 16 December 1971, after the end of the war, the committee was abolished.

== Former members ==
- Khwaja Khairuddin - President of the East Pakistan Council Muslim League
- Fakhruddin Ahmed - Secretary of thr East Pakistan Convention Muslim League

== See also ==
- Bangladesh genocide (1971)
  - Bangladesh Genocide Remembrance Day
  - Al Badr, perpetrator
  - Al Shams, perpetrator
  - Razakars, perpetrator
  - Mujahid Bahini, perpetrator
- List of massacres in Bangladesh
  - Persecution of Biharis in Bangladesh
  - Persecution of Buddhists in Bangladesh
  - Persecution of Hindus in Bangladesh
  - Persecution of Christians in Bangladesh
  - Persecution of atheists and secularists in Bangladesh
