= Razakars (Pakistan) =

East Pakistani paramilitary force

Razakar
- Active: 1971
- Disbanded: 16 December 1971
- Allegiance: Pakistan
- Type: Gendarmerie; Paramilitary; Auxiliary force
- Role: Internal security; Counter-insurgency; Light infantry
- Size: 50,000
- Garrison/HQ: Khulna, Kushtia, Savar
- Nickname: Razakar Bahini
- Engagements: Bangladesh War of Independence; Indo-Pakistani War of 1971

Commanders
- Notable commanders: Tikka Khan

The Razakars (Urdu: رضا کار Bengali: রাজাকার, lit. 'Volunteer') were a far-right, fascist gendarmerie and paramilitary force in East Pakistan organised by General Tikka Khan in 1971. They were organised as a counter-insurgency force to fight Mukti Bahini members in the Bangladesh War of Independence, and played an infamous role in the 1971 Bangladesh genocide. The Razakars were disbanded following Pakistan's defeat and surrender in the 1971 Indo-Pakistani War.

== Etymology and terminology ==
Razakar is a Persian term meaning volunteer. The Razakars in East Pakistan were formed by the Pakistan Army on the model of the Razakars of Hyderabad, which had been formed after the partition of India by the Nizam of Hyderabad to resist annexation by India.

The former Bangladesh government denoted all collaborators with the Pakistani forces as Razakars. This includes leaders, members of the East Pakistan Central Peace Committee, and even the Chakma King, Maharaja Tridev Roy.

In Bangladesh today, "Razakar" is used as a pejorative term meaning "traitor". During the 2024 Bangladesh quota reform movement to abolish or change the quota system that gave public benefits to descendants of freedom fighters, Prime Minister Sheikh Hasina dismissively asked whether grandchildren of Razakars should get quota benefits. This spurred the protesters to spontaneously self-identify as Razakars to reappropriate the use of the term. This led to several Razakar slogans being used in the July Revolution that toppled the regime of Sheikh Hasina.

== History and organization ==
In June 1971, the Ansar was disbanded and reconstituted as the Razakars. Initially, they were controlled by the Shanti Committee, which was formed by several pro-Pakistani leaders, including Nurul Amin and Khwaja Khairuddin. The first recruits were 96 Jamaat party members, who started training in an Ansar camp at Khan Jahan Ali Road, Khulna.

The East Pakistan Razakars Ordinance was promulgated on 2 August 1971 by the Governor of East Pakistan, Lieutenant General Tikka Khan. The ordinance stipulated the creation of a voluntary force to be trained and equipped by the provincial government. Then, they were reorganized as members of the Pakistan Army through an ordinance of the Ministry of Defence promulgated on 7 September 1971. The Razakar force was placed under the command of Major General Mohammed Jamshed. Organizational command of the Razakar Bahini was given to Abdur Rahim.

The Razakar force was organised into brigades of around 3,000–4,000 volunteers, mainly armed with light infantry weapons provided by the Pakistan Army. Each Razakar brigade was attached as an auxiliary to two Pakistan regular army brigades, and their main function was to arrest and detain pro-independence Bengalis and Bengali nationalists. Suspects were tortured during custody and killed. Razakars were trained by the Pakistan Army. Chakma youth from the Chittagong Hill Tracts actively joined the Razakar militia.

The Razakars were paid by the Pakistan Army and provincial administration. Leading supporters of a united Pakistan urged General Yahya Khan to increase the number of Razakars and give them more arms to extend their activities in East Pakistan. They were advised "to uproot secessionists, antisocialists and Naxalites."

Towards the end of 1971, increasing numbers of Razakars were deserting, as the end of the war approached and East Pakistan moved towards independence.

== Genocide ==
During the Bangladesh genocide of the Bangladesh War of Independence, the Pakistani military and several militia organizations created by the Pakistani military violated the Geneva Conventions of War by participating in numerous massacres of civilians, committed genocide of between 300,000 and 3 million civilians, operated concentration camps, and used rape as a weapon of war. Active collaborators of the Pakistan military in the perpetration of genocide and ethnic cleansing in East Pakistan include Al Badr, Al Shams, the East Pakistan Central Peace Committee, Razakars, the Muslim League, Mujahid Bahini, and Jamaat-e-Islami.

The Razakars violated the Geneva Conventions of War by participating in numerous massacres of civilians.

The Dakra massacre was an instance of one such massacre where 646 Bengali Hindus were killed.

On 5 August 1971, six Hindus were killed by Razakars in Panti village under Kumarkhali sub-division.

== Dissolution ==
Following the surrender of the Pakistani troops on 16 December 1971 and the proclamation of independence of Bangladesh, the Razakar units were dissolved. Jamaat-e-Islami was banned, as it opposed the independence of Bangladesh, and many Razakar commanders fled to Pakistan (previously West Pakistan).

Waves of violence followed the official end of the war, and some lower-ranking Razakars were killed in reprisals by Mukti Bahini militia. The government rounded up and imprisoned an estimated 36,000 men suspected of being Razakars. The government ultimately freed many of those held in jail, both in response to pressure from the United States and China, who backed Pakistan in the war, and to gain co-operation from Pakistan in obtaining the release of 200,000 Bengali-speaking military and civilian personnel who had been stranded or imprisoned in West Pakistan during the war.

== Trials ==
In 2010, the Bangladesh Government set up an International Crimes Tribunal based on the International Crimes Tribunal Act 1973 to prosecute the people who committed war crimes and crimes against humanity during the war in 1971. People of Pakistan who were not aware of their crimes due to censorship by the Yahya regime, openly welcomed their trials and even supported their public execution.

Delwar Hossain Sayeedi, the Nayeb-e-Ameer of Jamaat, was convicted of eight charges of war crimes and alleged to be a member of the Razakars, was sentenced to death for two of them in February 2013. However, the trial process has been termed as "politically motivated" by its critics, while the human rights groups recognised the tribunal as falling short of international standards.

=== Convicted members ===
- AKM Yusuf, the organiser of Razakar forces
- Forkan Mallik, a Razakar commander, convicted of rapes and forceful conversions in Mirzaganj, Patuakhali

On 16 December 2019, the government of Bangladesh published the names of 10,789 Razakars who collaborated with Pakistan's army in carrying out atrocities against the Bengalis during the 1971 War.

== See also ==
- International Crimes Tribunal Timeline
- Timeline of the Bangladesh War
- List of massacres in Bangladesh
  - Persecution of Biharis in Bangladesh
  - Persecution of Buddhists in Bangladesh
  - Persecution of Hindus in Bangladesh
  - Persecution of Christians in Bangladesh
  - Persecution of atheists and secularists in Bangladesh
