= Bangladesh genocide =

1971 genocide of Bengalis in East Pakistan

- Part of the Bangladesh Liberation War
- Corpses of Bengali nationalist intellectuals killed in Dhaka in December 1971, photographed by Rashid Talukdar
- Native name: একাত্তরের গণহত্যা বাঙালি গণহত্যা
- Location: East Pakistan (now Bangladesh)
- Date: 25 March 1971 – 16 December 1971 (8 months, 2 weeks and 6 days)
- Target: Bengalis
- Attack type: Ethnic cleansing through mass killing and genocidal rape
- Deaths: 300,000–3,000,000
- Victims: 200,000–400,000 women raped; 30,000,000 displaced
- Perpetrator: Pakistan
- Assailants: Pakistan Army; Razakars; Al-Badr; Al-Shams; Central Peace Committee; Civil Armed Force; Jamaat-e-Islami Pakistan; Mujahid Bahini
- Motive: Anti-Hindu sentiment, anti-Bengali racism
- Accused: Yahya Khan; Hamid Khan; Tikka Khan; A.A.K. Niazi; Khadim Hussain; Rao Farman Ali

The Bangladesh genocide (Note: Bengali: একাত্তরের গণহত্যা, romanized: Ēkātturēr Gôṇôhôtyā, lit. '71's genocide' or বাঙালি গণহত্যা, Bāṅāli Gôṇôhôtyā, 'Bengali genocide') was the ethnic cleansing of Bengalis residing in East Pakistan (now Bangladesh) during the Bangladesh Liberation War, perpetrated by the Pakistan Army and the Razakars militia. It began on 25 March 1971, as Operation Searchlight was launched by West Pakistan (now Pakistan) to militarily subdue the Bengali population of East Pakistan; the Bengalis comprised the demographic majority and had been calling for independence from the Pakistani state. Seeking to curtail the Bengali self-determination movement, Pakistani president Yahya Khan approved a large-scale military deployment, and in the nine-month-long conflict that ensued, Pakistani soldiers and local pro-Pakistan militias killed between 300,000 and 3,000,000 Bengalis and raped between 200,000 and 400,000 Bengali women in a systematic campaign of mass killing and genocidal sexual violence. Non-Bengali Bihari women were also raped during and after the war.

West Pakistanis in particular were shown by the news that the operation was carried out because of the 'rebellion by the East Pakistanis' and many activities at the time were hidden from them, including rape and ethnic cleansing of East Pakistanis by the Pakistani military. Although the majority of the victims were Bengali Muslims, Hindus were especially targeted. In their investigation of the genocide, the Geneva-based International Commission of Jurists concluded that Pakistan's campaign also involved the attempt to exterminate or forcibly remove a significant portion of the country's Hindu populace. The West Pakistani government, which had implemented discriminatory legislation in East Pakistan, asserted that Hindus were behind the Mukti Bahini (Bengali resistance fighters) revolt and that resolving the local "Hindu problem" would end the conflict—Khan's government and the Pakistani elite thus regarded the crackdown as a strategic policy. Genocidal rhetoric accompanied the campaign: Pakistani men believed that the sacrifice of Hindus was needed to fix the national malaise. In the countryside, Pakistani forces moved through villages and specifically asked for places where Hindus lived before burning them down. Hindus were identified by checking circumcision or by demanding the recitation of Muslim prayers. This also resulted in the migration of around eight million East Pakistani refugees into India, 80–90% of whom were Hindus.

Both Muslim and Hindu women were targeted for rape. West Pakistani forces wanted to cleanse a nation corrupted by the presence of Hindus and believed that the sacrifice of Hindu women was needed; Bengali women were thus viewed as Hindu or Hindu-like.

Pakistan's activities during the Bangladesh Liberation War served as a catalyst for India's military intervention in support of the Mukti Bahini, triggering the Indo-Pakistani War that began on December 3, 1971. The conflict and the genocide formally ended on 16 December 1971, when the joint forces of Bangladesh and India received the Pakistani Instrument of Surrender. As a result of the conflict, approximately 10 million East Bengali refugees fled to Indian territory while up to 30 million people were internally displaced out of the 70 million total population of East Pakistan. There was also ethnic violence between the Bengali majority and the Bihari minority during the conflict; between 1,000 and 150,000 Biharis were killed in reprisal attacks by Bengali militias and mobs, as Bihari collaboration with the West Pakistani campaign had led to further anti-Bihari sentiment. Since Pakistan's defeat and Bangladesh's independence, the title "Stranded Pakistanis in Bangladesh" has commonly been used to refer to the Bihari community, which was denied the right to hold Bangladeshi citizenship until 2008.

Allegations of a genocide in Bangladesh were rejected by most UN member states at the time and rarely appear in textbooks and academic sources on genocide studies.

== Background ==
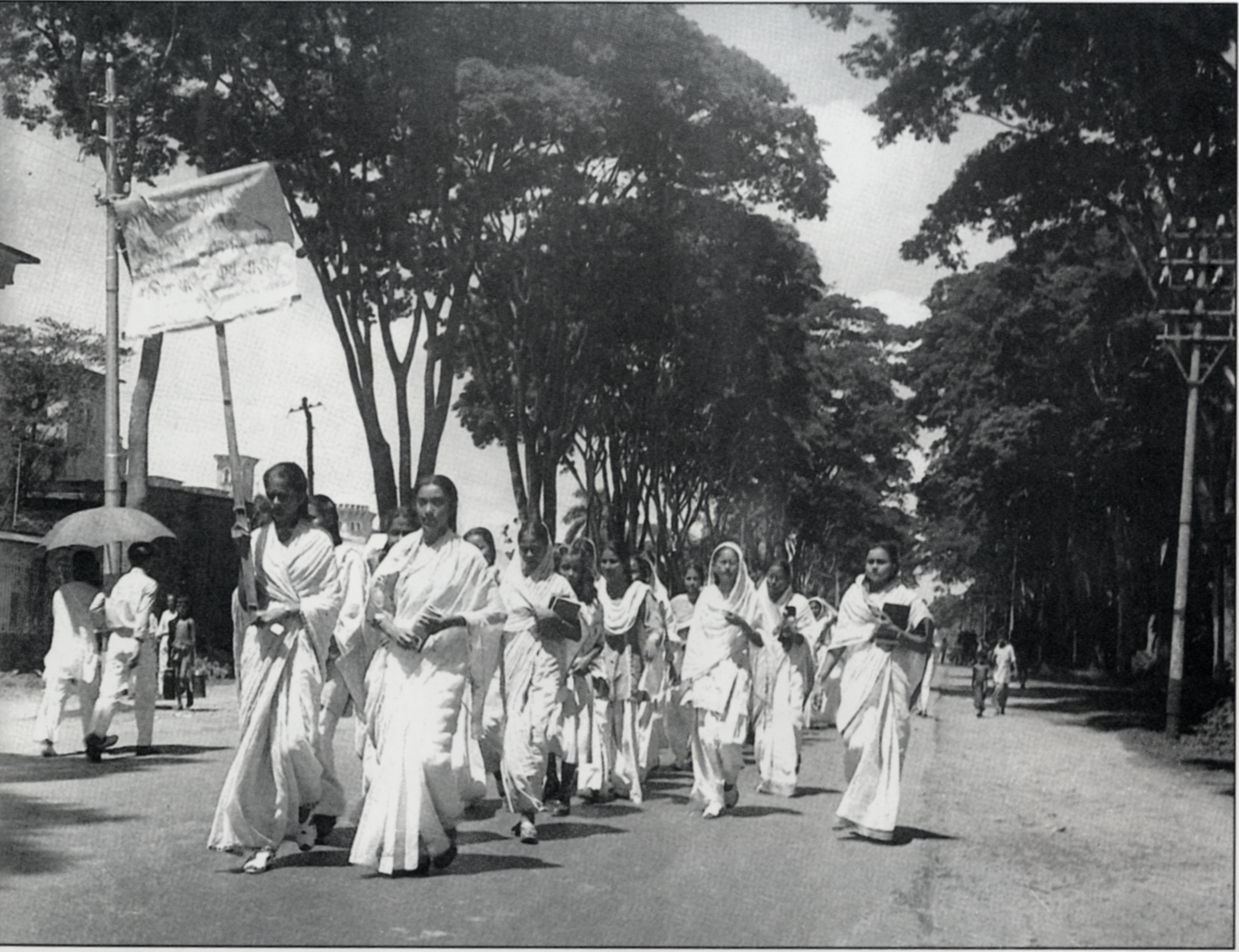
Female students of Dacca university marching on Language Movement Day, 21 February 1953.

=== West Pakistan and East Pakistan ===
Following the Partition of India, the new state of Pakistan represented a geographical anomaly, with two wings separated by 1,600 kilometres (1,000 mi) of Indian territory. The wings were not only separated geographically, but also culturally. The authorities of the West viewed the Bengali Muslims in the East as "too 'Bengali'" and their application of Islam as "inferior and impure", believing this made the Bengalis unreliable "co-religionists". The Pakistani leadership perceived elements of Hindu influence within Bengali language and culture. As a result, they made repeated efforts to mitigate or eradicate these perceived Hindu influences. Politicians in West Pakistan began a strategy to forcibly assimilate the Bengalis culturally and religiously. The ruling class of West Pakistan held political power over and looked down on Bengali Muslims from East Pakistan due to the influence of colonialism a colorist obsession for light skin led to viewing East Pakistanis as darker skinned compared to West Pakistanis.

The Bengali people were the demographic majority in Pakistan, making up an estimated 75 million in East Pakistan, compared with 55 million in the predominantly Punjabi-speaking West Pakistan. The majority in the East were Muslim, with large minorities of Hindus, Buddhists and Christians.

=== Discriminatory policies against Bengalis ===
In 1948, a few months after the creation of Pakistan, Governor-General Muhammad Ali Jinnah declared Urdu as the national language of the newly formed state, although only four per cent of Pakistan's population spoke Urdu at that time. He mentioned that the people of East Bengal could choose what would be its provincial language, and branded those who were against the use of Urdu as the national language of Pakistan as communists, traitors and enemies of the state. The refusal by successive governments to recognise Bengali as the second national language culminated in the Bengali language movement and strengthened support for the newly formed Awami League, which was founded in the East as an alternative to the ruling Muslim League. A 1952 protest in Dacca, the capital of East Pakistan, was forcibly broken up, resulting in the deaths of several protesters. Bengali nationalists viewed those who had died as martyrs for their cause, and the violence led to calls for secession. The Indo-Pakistani War of 1965 caused further grievances, as the military had assigned no extra units to the defence of the East. This was a matter of concern to the Bengalis who saw their nation undefended in case of Indian attack during the conflict of 1965, and that Ayub Khan, the President of Pakistan, was willing to lose the East if it meant gaining Kashmir.

The slow response to the Bhola cyclone which struck on 12 November 1970 is widely seen as a contributing factor in the December 1970 general election. The East Pakistan-based Awami League, headed by Sheikh Mujibur Rahman, won a national majority in the first democratic election since the creation of Pakistan, sweeping East Pakistan. But, the West Pakistani establishment prevented them from forming a government. President Yahya Khan, encouraged by Zulfikar Ali Bhutto, banned the Awami League and declared martial law. The Pakistani Army demolished Ramna Kali Mandir (temple) and killed 85 Hindus. On 22 February 1971, General Yahya Khan is reported to have said "Kill three million of them, and the rest will eat out of our hands."

=== Bengali independence movement ===
Some Bengalis supported a united Pakistan and opposed secession from it. According to Indian academic Sarmila Bose, these pro-Pakistan Bengalis constituted a significant minority, and included the Islamic parties. Moreover, many Awami League voters who hoped to achieve provincial autonomy may not have desired secession. Additionally, some Bengali officers and soldiers remained loyal to the Pakistani Army and were taken as prisoners of war by India along with other West Pakistani soldiers. Thus, according to Sarmila Bose, there were many pro-regime Bengalis who killed and persecuted the pro-liberation fighters. Sydney Schanberg reported the formation of armed civilian units by the Pakistani Army in June 1971. Only a minority of the recruits were Bengali, while most were Biharis and Urdu speakers. The units with local knowledge played an important role in the implementation of the Pakistani Army's genocide. American writer Gary J. Bass believes that the breakup of Pakistan was not inevitable, identifying 25 March 1971 as the point where the idea of a united Pakistan ended for Bengalis with the start of military operations. According to John H. Gill, since there was widespread polarisation between pro-Pakistan Bengalis and pro-liberation Bengalis during the war, those internal battles are still playing out in the domestic politics of modern-day Bangladesh.

== Operation Searchlight ==
Operation Searchlight was a planned military operation carried out by the Pakistani Army to curb elements of the separatist Bengali nationalist movement in East Pakistan in March 1971. The Pakistani state justified commencing Operation Searchlight on the basis of anti-Bihari violence by Bengalis in early March. Ordered by the government in West Pakistan, this was seen as the sequel to Operation Blitz which had been launched in November 1970. On 1 March 1971, East Pakistan governor Vice Admiral S. M. Ahsan was replaced after disagreeing with military action in East Pakistan. His successor Sahibzada Yaqub Khan resigned after refusing to use soldiers to quell a mutiny and disagreement with military action in East Pakistan.

According to Indian academic Sarmila Bose, the postponement of the National Assembly on 1 March led to widespread lawlessness spread by Bengali protesters during the period of 1–25 March, in which the Pakistani government lost control over much of the province. Bose asserts that during this 25-day period of lawlessness, attacks by Bengalis on non-Bengalis were common as well as attacks by Bengalis on Pakistani military personnel who, according to Bose and Anthony Mascarenhas, showed great restraint until 25 March, when Operation Searchlight began. Bose also described the atrocities committed by the Pakistani Army in her book. According to Anthony Mascarenhas, the actions of the Pakistani Army compared to the violence by Bengalis was "altogether worse and on a grander scale."

On the night of 25 March 1971, the Pakistani Army launched Operation Searchlight. Time magazine dubbed General Tikka Khan the "Butcher of Bengal" for his role in Operation Searchlight. Targets of the operation included Jagannath Hall which was a dormitory for non-Muslim students of Dhaka University, Rajarbagh Police Lines, and Pilkhana, which is the headquarters of East Pakistan Rifles. About 34 students were killed in the dormitories of Dhaka University. Neighbourhoods of old Dhaka which had a majority Hindu population were also attacked. Robert Payne, an American journalist, estimated that 7,000 people had been killed and 3,000 arrested in that night. Teachers of Dhaka University were killed in the operation by the Pakistani Army. Sheikh Mujib was arrested by the Pakistani Army on 25 March. Ramna Kali Mandir was demolished by the Pakistani Army in March 1971.

The original plan envisioned taking control of the major cities on 26 March 1971, and then eliminating all opposition, political or military, within one month. The prolonged Bengali resistance was not anticipated by Pakistani planners. The main phase of Operation Searchlight ended with the fall of the last major town in Bengali hands in mid May. The countryside still remained almost evenly contested.

The first report of the Bangladesh genocide was published by West Pakistani journalist Anthony Mascarenhas in The Sunday Times, London on 13 June 1971 titled "Genocide". He wrote: "I saw Hindus, hunted from village to village and door to door, shot off-hand after a cursory 'short-arm inspection' showed they were uncircumcised. I have heard the screams of men bludgeoned to death in the compound of the Circuit House (civil administrative headquarters) in Comilla. I have seen truckloads of other human targets and those who had the humanity to try to help them hauled off 'for disposal' under the cover of darkness and curfew." This article helped turn world opinion against Pakistan and decisively encouraged the Government of India to intervene. On 2 August 1971, Time magazine correspondent sent a dispatch that provided detailed description of the Pakistani army-led destruction in East Pakistan. It wrote that cities have whole sections damaged from shelling and aerial bombardments. The dispatch wrote: "In Dhaka, where soldiers set sections of the Old City ablaze with flamethrowers and then machine-gunned thousands as they tried to escape the cordon of fire, nearly 25 blocks have been bulldozed clear, leaving open areas set incongruously amid jam-packed slums." It quoted a senior US official as saying "It is the most incredible, calculated thing since the days of the Nazis in Poland."

=== The Blood Telegram ===
Archer K. Blood, American diplomat, wrote on 28 March 1971 in the Blood Telegram addressing Richard Nixon administration's disregard for the situation: "with support of the Pak military, non-Bengali Muslims are systematically attacking poor people's quarters and murdering Bengalis and Hindus."

== Estimated death toll ==
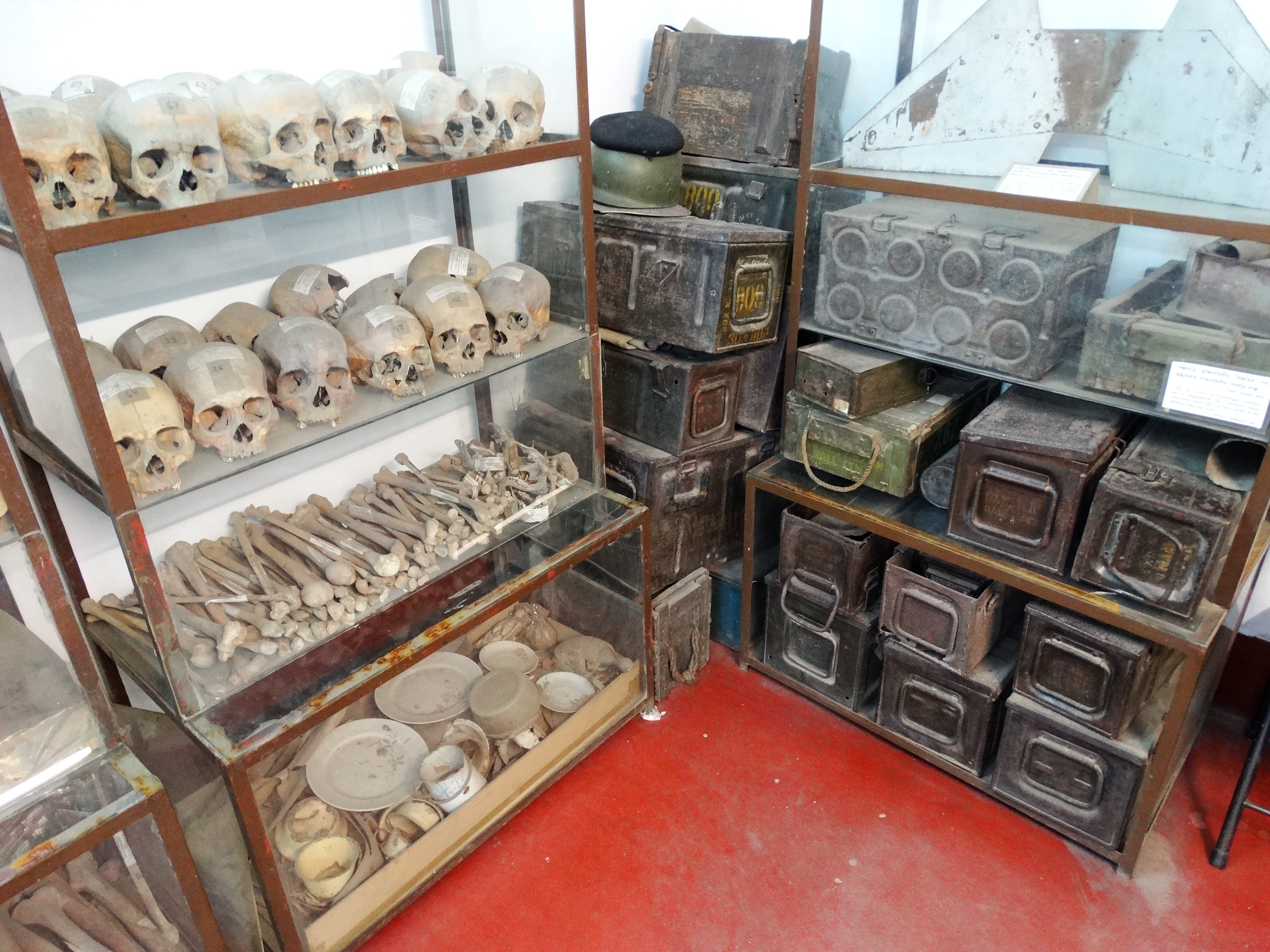
Human remains and war materiel from 1971 genocide in Liberation War Museum

On the high end, Bangladeshi authorities claim that as many as 3 million people were killed; the lowest estimate comes from the controversial Hamoodur Rahman Commission, the official Pakistani government investigation, which claimed the figure was 26,000 civilian casualties. The figure of 3 million has become embedded in Bangladeshi culture and literature. Sayyid A. Karim, Bangladesh's first foreign secretary alleges that the source of the figure was Pravda, the news-arm of the Communist Party of the Soviet Union. Independent researchers have estimated the death toll to be around 300,000 to 500,000 people while others estimate the casualty figure to be 3 million. Midway through the genocide, the CIA and the State Department conservatively estimated that 200,000 people had been killed. The estimate of 3 million has come under strict scrutiny.

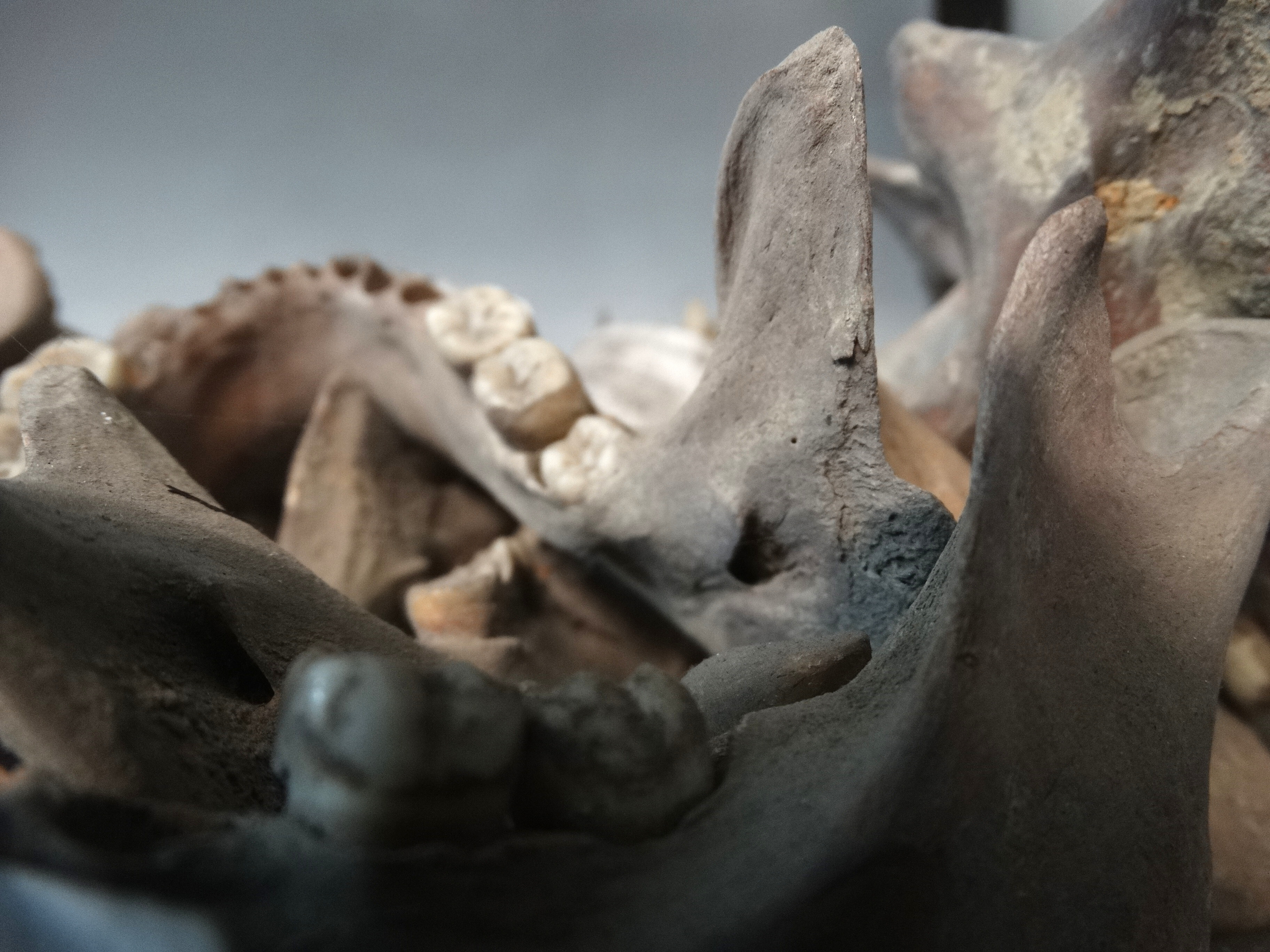
Pile of bones of those killed in the Bangladesh Genocide

According to Sarmila Bose's controversial book Dead Reckoning: Memories of the 1971 Bangladesh War, the number lies somewhere between 50,000 and 100,000. However, her book was the subject of strong criticism by journalists; writer and visual artist Naeem Mohaiemen; Nayanika Mookherjee, an anthropologist at Durham University; and others.

In 1976, the International Centre for Diarrhoeal Disease Research, Bangladesh undertook a comprehensive population survey in Matlab, Noakhali where a total of 868 excess wartime deaths were recorded; this led to an estimated overall excess number of deaths in the whole of Bangladesh of nearly 500,000. Based on this study, the British Medical Journal in 2008, conducted a study by Ziad Obermeyer, Christopher J. L. Murray, and Emmanuela Gakidou which estimated that 125,000–505,000 civilians died as a result of the conflict; the authors note that this is far higher than a previous estimate of 58,000 by Uppsala University and the Peace Research Institute, Oslo. This figure is supported by the statements of Bangladeshi author Ahmed Sharif in 1996, who added that "they kept the truth hidden for getting political advantages." American political scientists Richard Sisson and Leo E. Rose give a low-end estimate of 300,000 dead, killed by all parties, and they deny that a genocide occurred, while American political scientist R. J. Rummel estimated that about 1.5 million people were killed in Bangladesh. Indian journalist Nirmal Sen claims that the total number killed was about 250,000 and among them, about 100,000 were Bengalis and the rest were Biharis.

A 2018 paper by Christian Gerlach concluded that overall deaths due to the war in East Pakistan slightly exceeded half a million and could not have exceeded 1 million, adding that the majority of the dead were rural dwellers who died of "hunger, want, and exhaustion" with many deaths occurring in the year following the conflict. Out of 200,000 members of the Awami League, the paper states that, 17,000 were killed with the leaders of the league experiencing a death ratio of 15 to 20 out of 167. The paper also denies based on statistical evidence that there was a coordinated attempt to exterminate the Bengali intelligentsia stating: "if one accepts the data published by the Bangladesh propaganda ministry, 4.2 per cent of all university professors were killed, along with 1.4 per cent of all college teachers, 0.6 per cent of all secondary and primary school teachers, and 0.6 per cent of all teaching personnel. On the basis of the aforementioned Ministry of Education data, 1.2 per cent of all teaching personnel were killed. This is hardly proof of an extermination campaign."

Many of those killed were the victims of radical religious paramilitary militias formed by the West Pakistani Army, including the Razakars, Al-Shams and Al-Badr forces. There are many mass graves in Bangladesh, and more are continually being discovered (such as one in an old well near a mosque in Dhaka, located in the Mirpur region of the city, which was discovered in August 1999). The first night of war on Bengalis, which is documented in telegrams from the American Consulate in Dhaka to the United States State Department, saw indiscriminate killings of students of Dhaka University and other civilians.

On 16 December 2002, the George Washington University's National Security Archive published a collection of declassified documents, consisting mostly of communications between US embassy officials and USIS centres in Dhaka and India, and officials in Washington, DC. These documents show that US officials working in diplomatic institutions within Bangladesh used the terms selective genocide and genocide (see Blood telegram) to describe events they had knowledge of at the time. The complete chronology of events as reported to the Nixon administration can be found on the Department of State website.

== Pro-Pakistan Islamist militias ==
The Jamaat-e-Islami party as well as some other pro-Pakistani Islamists opposed the Bangladeshi independence struggle and collaborated with the Pakistani state and armed forces out of Islamic solidarity. According to political scientist Peter Tomsen, Pakistan's secret service, in conjunction with the political party Jamaat-e-Islami, formed militias such as Al-Badr ("the moon") and the Al-Shams ("the sun") to conduct operations against the nationalist movement. These militias targeted noncombatants and committed rapes as well as other crimes. Local collaborators known as Razakars also took part in the atrocities. The term has since become a pejorative akin to the western term "Judas".

Members of the Muslim League, Nizam-e-Islam, Jamaat-e-Islami and Jamiat Ulema Pakistan, who had lost the election, collaborated with the military and acted as an intelligence organisation for them. Jamaat-e-Islami members and some of its leaders collaborated with the Pakistani forces in rapes and targeted killings. The atrocities by Al-Badr and the Al-Shams garnered worldwide attention from news agencies; accounts of massacres and rapes were widely reported.

== Killing of Bengali intellectuals ==
During the war, the Pakistani Army and its local collaborators, mainly Jamaat e Islami carried out a systematic execution of the leading Bengali intellectuals. A number of professors from Dhaka University were killed during the first few days of the war. However, the most extreme cases of targeted killing of intellectuals took place during the last few days of the war. Professors, journalists, doctors, artists, engineers and writers were rounded up by the Pakistani Army and the Razakar militia in Dhaka, blindfolded, taken to torture cells in Mirpur, Mohammadpur, Nakhalpara, Rajarbagh and other locations in different sections of the city to be executed en masse, most notably at Rayerbazar and Mirpur. Allegedly, the Pakistani Army and its paramilitary arm, the Al-Badr and Al-Shams forces created a list of doctors, teachers, poets, and scholars.

During the nine-month duration of the war the Pakistani Army, with the assistance of local collaborators, systematically executed an estimated 991 teachers, 13 journalists, 49 physicians, 42 lawyers, and 16 writers, artists and engineers. Even after the official ending of the war on 16 December there were reports of killings being committed by either the armed Pakistani soldiers or by their collaborators. In one such incident, notable filmmaker Jahir Raihan was killed on 30 January 1972 in Mirpur, allegedly by armed Beharis. In memory of the people who were killed, 14 December is observed in Bangladesh as Shaheed Buddhijibi Dibosh ("Day of the Martyred Intellectuals").

Notable intellectuals who were killed from the time period of 25 March to 16 December 1971 in different parts of the country include Dhaka University professors Dr. Govinda Chandra Dev (philosophy), Dr. Munier Chowdhury (Bengali literature), Dr. Mufazzal Haider Chaudhury (Bengali Literature), Dr. Anwar Pasha (Bengali Literature), Dr M Abul Khair (history), Dr. Jyotirmoy Guhathakurta (English literature), Humayun Kabir (English literature), Rashidul Hasan (English literature), Ghyasuddin Ahmed, Sirajul Haque Khan, Faizul Mahi, Dr Santosh Chandra Bhattacharyya and Saidul Hassan (physics), Rajshahi University professors Dr. Hobibur Rahman (mathematics), Prof Sukhranjan Somaddar (Sanskrit), Prof Mir Abdul Quaiyum (psychology) as well as Dr. Mohammed Fazle Rabbee (cardiologist), Dr. AFM Alim Chowdhury (ophthalmologist), Shahidullah Kaiser (journalist), Nizamuddin Ahmed (journalist), Selina Parvin (journalist), Altaf Mahmud (lyricist and musician), Dhirendranath Datta (politician), Jahir Raihan (novelist, journalist, film director) and Ranadaprasad Saha (philanthropist).

== Violence ==
=== Rape of Bengali women ===
The generally accepted figure for the mass rapes during the nine-month long conflict is between 200,000 and 400,000. Both Muslim and Hindu women were targeted for rape. West Pakistani men wanted to cleanse a nation corrupted by the presence of Hindus and believed that the sacrifice of Hindu women was needed; Bengali women were thus viewed as Hindu or Hindu-like. Imams, mullahs, and a fatwa from West Pakistan declared that Bengali women could be handled as gonimoter maal ("war booty" or "public property").

Bangladeshi sources cite a figure of 200,000 women raped, giving birth to thousands of war-babies. The soldiers of the Pakistan Army and razakars also kept Bengali women as sex-slaves inside the Pakistani Army's camps, and many became pregnant. The perpetrators also included Mukti Bahini and the Indian Army, which targeted noncombatants and committed rapes, as well as other crimes. Among other sources, Susan Brownmiller refers to an estimated 200,000 to 400,000 women raped. Pakistani sources claim the number is much lower, though they have not denied that rape incidents occurred. Brownmiller writes:

Khadiga, thirteen years old, was interviewed by a photojournalist in Dacca. She was walking to school with four other girls when they were kidnapped by a gang of Pakistani soldiers. All five were put in a military brothel in Mohammedpur and held captive for six months until the end of the war.

In a New York Times report named 'Horrors of East Pakistan Turning Hope into Despair', Malcolm W. Browne wrote:

One tale that is widely believed and seems to come from many different sources is that 563 women picked up by the army in March and April and held in military brothels are not being released because they are pregnant beyond the point at which abortions are possible.

The licentious attitude of the soldiers, although generally supported by their superiors, alarmed the regional high command of the Pakistani Army. On 15 April 1971, in a secret memorandum to the divisional commanders, Niazi complained,

Since my arrival, I have heard numerous reports of troops indulging in loot and arson, killing people at random and without reasons in areas cleared of the anti state elements; of late there have been reports of rape and even the West Pakistanis are not being spared; on 12 April two West Pakistani women were raped, and an attempt was made on two others.

Anthony Mascarenhas published a newspaper article titled 'Genocide in June 1971' in which he also wrote about violence perpetrated by Bengalis against Biharis.

First it was the massacre of the non-Bengalis in a savage outburst of Bengali hatred. Now it was massacre deliberately carried out by the West Pakistan army ... The West Pakistani soldiers are not the only ones who have been killing in East Bengal, of course. On the night of 25 March... the Bengali troops and paramilitary units stationed in East Pakistan mutinied and attacked non-Bengalis with atrocious savagery. Thousands of families of unfortunate Muslims, many of them refugees from Bihar who chose Pakistan at the time of the partition riots in 1947, were mercilessly wiped out. Women were raped, or had their breasts torn out with specially-fashioned knives. Children did not escape the horror; the lucky ones were killed with their parents...

Pakistani Major General Khadim Hussain Raja wrote in his book that Niazi, in presence of Bengali officers would say 'Main iss haramzadi qom ki nasal badal doonga (I will change the race of the Bengalis)'. A witness statement to the commission read "The troops used to say that when the Commander (Lt Gen Niazi) was himself a raper (sic), how could they be stopped?"

Another work that has included direct experiences from the women raped is Ami Birangona Bolchhi ("I, the heroine, speak") by Nilima Ibrahim. The work includes in its name from the word Birangona (Heroine), given by Sheikh Mujibur Rahman after the war, to the raped and tortured women during the war. This was a conscious effort to alleviate any social stigma the women might face in the society.

There are eyewitness reports of the "rape camps" established by the Pakistani Army. The US based Women Under Siege Project of the Women's Media Center have reported the girls as young as 8 and women as old as 75 were detained in Pakistan military barracks, and where they were victims of mass rape which sometimes culminated in mass murder. The report was based on interview with survivors. Australian Doctor Geoffrey Davis was brought to Bangladesh by the United Nation and International Planned Parenthood Federation to carry out late term abortions on rape victims. He was of the opinion that the 200,000 to 400,000 rape victims were an underestimation. On the actions of Pakistan army he said "They'd keep the infantry back and put artillery ahead and they would shell the hospitals and schools. And that caused absolute chaos in the town. And then the infantry would go in and begin to segregate the women. Apart from little children, all those were (sic) sexually matured would be segregated..And then the women would be put in the compound under guard and made available to the troops ... Some of the stories they told were appalling. Being raped again and again and again. A lot of them died in those [rape] camps. There was an air of disbelief about the whole thing. Nobody could credit that it really happened! But the evidence clearly showed that it did happen."

In October 2005, Sarmila Bose published a paper suggesting that the casualties and rape allegations in the war have been greatly exaggerated for political purposes. Whilst she received praise from many quarters, a number of researchers have shown inaccuracies in Bose's work, including flawed methodology of statistical analysis, misrepresentation of referenced sources, and disproportionate weight to Pakistani Army testimonies.

Historian Christian Gerlach states that "a systematic collection of statistical data was aborted, possibly because the tentative data did not substantiate the claim that three million had died and at least 200,000 women had been raped."

=== Mass murder of Hindus ===
An article in Time magazine, dated 2 August 1971, stated "The Hindus, who account for three-fourths of the refugees and a majority of the dead, have borne the brunt of the Muslim military hatred." Pakistan army eastern command headquarters officials in Dhaka made clear the government's policy on East Bengal. After the elimination or exile of Hindus, their property was going to be shared among middle class Muslims. According to Colonel Naim, Hindus "undermined the Muslim masses." He said Bengali culture to a great extent was Hindu culture, and "We have to sort them out to restore the land to the people." In April 1971 at Comilla, Major Rathore said to Anthony Mascarenhas, regarding Hindus: "Now under the cover of fighting we have an excellent opportunity of finishing them off. [...] Of course [...], we are only killing the Hindu men. We are soldiers, not cowards like the rebels."

Hindus were alleged to have corrupted the Awami League. Pakistani soldiers repeatedly boasted to US Consul Archer Blood that they came "to kill Hindus." A witness heard an officer shouting to soldiers: "Why you have killed Muslims [sic]. We ordered you to kill only Hindus." US government cables noted that the minorities of Bangladesh, especially the Hindus, were specific targets of the Pakistani Army. US consulates reported methodical slaughter of Hindu men in cities starting in the first 24 hours of the crackdown. Army units entered villages asking where Hindus live; it was "common pattern" to kill Hindu males. Hindus were identified because they were not circumcised. There were barely any areas where no Hindu was killed. Sometimes the military also massacred Hindu women. There was widespread killing of Hindu males, and rapes of women. Documented incidents in which Hindus were massacred in large numbers include the Jathibhanga massacre, the Chuknagar massacre, and the Shankharipara massacre.

Senator Edward Kennedy wrote in a report that was part of United States Senate Committee on Foreign Relations testimony, dated 1 November 1971, "Hardest hit have been members of the Hindu community who have been robbed of their lands and shops, systematically slaughtered, and in some places, painted with yellow patches marked "H". All of this has been officially sanctioned, ordered and implemented under martial law from Islamabad." More than 60% of the Bengali refugees who fled to India were Hindus. It has been alleged that this widespread violence against Hindus was motivated by a policy to purge East Pakistan of what was seen as Hindu and Indian influences. Buddhist temples and Buddhist monks were also attacked throughout the course of the year. Lt. Colonel Aziz Ahmed Khan reported that in May 1971 there was a written order to kill Hindus, and that General Niazi would ask troops how many Hindus they had killed.

The genocide and gendercidal atrocities were also perpetrated by lower-ranking officers and ordinary soldiers. These "willing executioners" were fueled by an abiding anti-Bengali racism, especially against the Hindu minority. According to R. J. Rummel, professor of political science at the University of Hawaii,

Bengalis were often compared with monkeys and chickens. Said Pakistan General Niazi, "It was a low lying land of low lying people." The Hindus among the Bengalis were as Jews to the Nazis: scum and vermin that [should] best be exterminated. As to the Moslem Bengalis, they were to live only on the sufferance of the soldiers: any infraction, any suspicion cast on them, any need for reprisal, could mean their death. And the soldiers were free to kill at will. The journalist Dan Coggin quoted one Punjabi [Pakistani] captain as telling him, "We can kill anyone for anything. We are accountable to no one." This is the arrogance of Power.

The Pulitzer Prize–winning journalist Sydney Schanberg covered the start of the war and wrote extensively on the suffering of the East Bengalis, including the Hindus both during and after the conflict. In a syndicated column "The Pakistani Slaughter That Nixon Ignored", he wrote about his return to liberated Bangladesh in 1972. "Other reminders were the yellow "H"s the Pakistanis had painted on the homes of Hindus, particular targets of the Muslim army" (by "Muslim army", meaning the Pakistan Army, which had targeted Bengali Muslims as well). Missionaries in Bangladesh reported to Schanberg that massacres occurred on a nearly daily basis. One reported the slaughter of over a thousand Hindus in the southern district of Barisal in a single day. According to another, a Peace Committee in northeastern Sylhet district called residents together. Troops arrived and from the gathered crowd selected 300 Hindus and shot them dead.

== Bengali attacks on Biharis ==
In 1947, at the time of partition and the establishment of the state of Pakistan, Bihari Muslims, many of whom were fleeing the violence that took place during partition, migrated from India to the newly independent East Pakistan. These Urdu-speaking people were averse to the Bengali language movement and the subsequent nationalist movements because they maintained allegiance toward West Pakistani rulers, causing anti-Bihari sentiments among local nationalist Bengalis. After the convening of the National Assembly was postponed by Yahya Khan on 1 March 1971, the dissidents in East Pakistan began targeting the ethnic Bihari community which had supported West Pakistan.

In early March 1971, 300 Biharis were slaughtered in rioting by Bengali mobs in Chittagong alone. The Government of Pakistan used the 'Bihari massacre' to justify its deployment of the military in East Pakistan on 25 March, when it initiated its infamous Operation Searchlight. When the war broke out in 1971, the Biharis sided with the Pakistani Army. Some of them joined Razakar and Al-Shams militia groups and participated in the persecution and genocide of their Bengali countrymen, in retaliation for atrocities committed against them by Bengalis, including the widespread looting of Bengali properties and abetting other criminal activities. When the war finished Biharis faced severe retaliation, resulting in a counter-genocide and the displacement of over a million non-Bengalis.

According to the Minorities at Risk project, the number of Biharis killed by Bengalis was reportedly about 1,000. Rudolph Rummel gives an estimate of 150,000 killed. International estimates vary, while some have put the deaths as several thousands; Biharis faced reprisals from the Mukti Bahini and militias, and from 1,000 to 150,000 were killed. Bihari representatives claim a figure of 500,000 Biharis killed.

After the war the government of Bangladesh confiscated the properties of the Bihari population. There are many reports of attacks on Biharis and alleged collaborators that took place in the period following the surrender of the Pakistani Army on 16 December 1971. In an incident on 18 December 1971, captured on camera and attended by members of the foreign press, Abdul Kader Siddiqui, together with Kaderia Bahini guerrillas under his command and named after him, bayoneted and shot to death a group of prisoners of war who were accused of belonging to the Razakar paramilitary forces.

== International reactions ==
Time reported a high US official as saying of the slaughter of the East Pakistanis by their West Pakistani enemies, "It is the most incredible, calculated thing since the days of the Nazis in Poland". Genocide is the term that is used to describe the event in almost every major publication and newspaper in Bangladesh; the term is defined as "the deliberate and systematic destruction, in whole or in part, of an ethnic, racial, religious, or national group"

=== International Commission of Jurists ===
A 1972 report by the International Commission of Jurists (ICJ) noted that both sides in the conflict accused each other of perpetrating genocide. The report observed that it may be difficult to substantiate claims that the "whole of the military action and repressive measures taken by the Pakistani Army and their auxiliary forces constituted genocide' that was intended to destroy the Bengali people in whole or in part, and that 'preventing a nation from attaining political autonomy does not constitute genocide: the intention must be to destroy in whole or in part the people as such." The difficulty of proving intent was considered to be further complicated by the fact that three specific sections of the Bengali people were targeted in killings committed by the Pakistani Army and their collaborators: members of the Awami League, students, and East Pakistani citizens of the Hindu religion. The report observed, however, that there is a strong prima facie case that particular acts of genocide were committed, especially towards the end of the war, when Bengalis were targeted indiscriminately. Similarly, it was felt that there is a strong prima facie case that crimes of genocide were committed against the Hindu population of East Pakistan.

As regards the massacres of non-Bengalis by Bengalis during and after the Liberation War, the ICJ report argued that it is improbable that "spontaneous and frenzied mob violence against a particular section of the community from whom the mob senses danger and hostility is to be regarded as possessing the necessary element of conscious intent to constitute the crime of genocide," but that, if the dolus specialis were to be proved in particular cases, these would have constituted acts of genocide against non-Bengalis.

After the minimum 20 countries became parties to the Genocide Convention, it came into force as international law on 12 January 1951. At that time however, only two of the five permanent members of the UN Security Council were parties to the treaty, and it was not until after the last of the five permanent members ratified the treaty in 1988, and the Cold War came to an end, that the international law on the crime of genocide began to be enforced. As such, the allegation that genocide took place during the Bangladesh Liberation War of 1971 was never investigated by an international tribunal set up under the auspices of the United Nations.

Rudolph Rummel wrote, "In 1971, the self-appointed president of Pakistan and commander-in-chief of the army General Agha Mohammed Yahya Khan and his top generals prepared a careful and systematic military, economic, and political operation against East Pakistan (now Bangladesh). They planned to murder that country's Bengali intellectual, cultural, and political elite. They planned to indiscriminately murder hundreds of thousands of its Hindus and drive the rest into India. And they planned to destroy its economic base to insure that it would be subordinate to West Pakistan for at least a generation to come. This despicable and cutthroat plan was outright genocide."

The genocide is also mentioned in some publications outside the subcontinent; for example, The Guinness Book of Records lists the atrocities as one of the largest five genocides in the twentieth century.

=== U.S. complicity ===
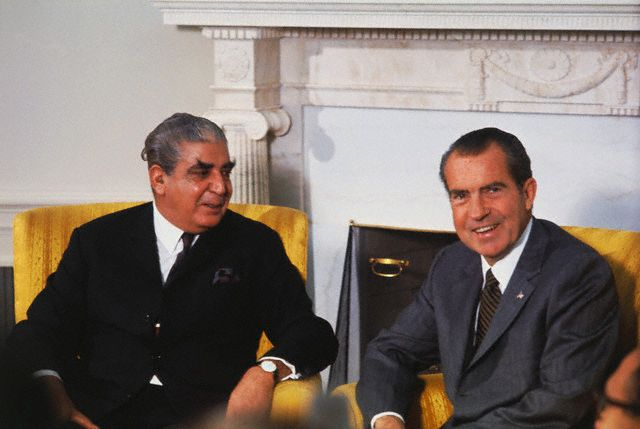
President of Pakistan Yahya Khan with United States President Richard Nixon, 1970.

President Richard Nixon viewed Pakistan as a Cold War ally and refused to condemn its actions. From the White House tapes: "The President seems to be making sure that the distrusted State Department would not, on its own, condemn Yahya for killing Bengalis." Nixon and China tried to suppress reports of genocide emanating from East Pakistan. Nixon also relied on Americans not paying close attention to events in Asia, comparing it to reactions over the atrocities in Biafra during the Nigerian Civil War: "Biafra stirred up a few Catholics. But you know, I think Biafra stirred people up more than Pakistan, because Pakistan they're just a bunch of brown goddamn Moslems."

The US government secretly encouraged the shipment of weapons from Iran, Turkey, and Jordan to Pakistan, and reimbursed those countries for them despite Congressional objections.

A collection of declassified US government documents, mostly consisting of communications between US officials in Washington, DC, and in embassies and USIS centers in Dhaka and in India, show that US officials knew about these mass killings at the time and, in fact, used the terms "genocide" and "selective genocide", for example, in the "Blood Telegram". They also show that President Nixon, advised by Henry Kissinger, decided to downplay this secret internal advice, because he wanted to protect the interests of Pakistan as he was apprehensive of India's friendship with the USSR, and he was seeking a closer relationship with China, which supported Pakistan.

In his book The Trial of Henry Kissinger, Christopher Hitchens elaborates on what he saw as the efforts of Kissinger to subvert the aspirations of independence on the part of the Bengalis. Hitchens not only claims that the term genocide is appropriate to describe the results of the struggle, but also points to the efforts of Henry Kissinger in undermining others who condemned the then-ongoing atrocities as being a genocide. Hitchens concluded, "Kissinger was responsible for the killing of thousands of people, including Sheikh Mujibur Rahman".

Some American politicians did speak out. Senator Ted Kennedy charged Pakistan with committing genocide, and called for a complete cut-off of American military and economic aid to Pakistan.

== Attempted trials for Pakistani war crimes ==
As early as 22 December 1971, the Indian Army was conducting investigations of senior Pakistani Army officers connected to the massacre of intellectuals in Dhaka, with the aim of collecting sufficient evidence to have them tried as war criminals. They produced a list of officers who were in positions of command at the time, or were connected to the Inter-Services Screening Committee.

=== 1972–1975 ===
On 24 December 1971, Home minister of Bangladesh A. H. M. Qamaruzzaman said, "war criminals will not survive from the hands of law. Pakistani military personnel who were involved with killing and raping have to face tribunal." In a joint statement after a meeting between Sheikh Mujib and Indira Gandhi, the Indian government assured that it would give all necessary assistance for bringing war criminals into justice. In February 1972, the government of Bangladesh announced plans to put 100 senior Pakistani officers and officials on trial for crimes of genocide. The list included General A. K. Niazi and four other generals.

After the war, the Indian Army held 92,000 Pakistani prisoners of war, 195 of whom were suspected of committing war crimes. All 195 were released in April 1974 following the tripartite Delhi Agreement between Bangladesh, Pakistan and India, and repatriated to Pakistan, in return for Pakistan's recognition of Bangladesh. Pakistan expressed interest in performing a trial against those 195 officials. Fearing for the fate of 400,000 Bengalis trapped in Pakistan, Bangladesh agreed to hand them over to Pakistani authorities.

The Bangladeshi Collaborators (Special Tribunals) Order of 1972 was promulgated to bring to trial those Bangladeshis who collaborated with and aided the Pakistani Armed forces during the Liberation War of 1971. There are conflicting accounts of the number of persons brought to trial under the 1972 Collaborators Order, ranging between 10,000 and 40,000. At the time, the trials were considered problematic by local and external observers, because they appear to have been used for carrying out political vendettas. R. MacLennan, a British MP who was an observer at the trials stated that 'In the dock, the defendants are scarcely more pitiable than the succession of confused prosecution witnesses driven (by the 88-year-old defence counsel) to admit that they, too, served the Pakistani government but are now ready to swear blindly that their real loyalty was to the government of Bangladesh in exile.' In May 1973, the Pakistani government detained Bengali civil servants stranded in Pakistan, as well as their family members, in response to Bangladesh's attempt to try POWs for genocide. Pakistan unsuccessfully pleaded five times to the International Court of Justice to contest Bangladesh's application of the term "genocide".

The government of Bangladesh issued a general amnesty on 30 November 1973, applying it to all persons except those who were punished or accused of rape, murder, attempted murder or arson. The Collaborators Order of 1972 was revoked in 1975.

The International Crimes (Tribunals) Act of 1973 was promulgated to prosecute any persons, irrespective of nationality, who were accused of committing crimes against peace, crimes against humanity, war crimes, "violations of any humanitarian rules applicable in armed conflicts laid out in the Geneva Conventions of 1949" and "any other crimes under international law". Detainees held under the 1972 Collaborators Order who were not released by the general amnesty of 1973 were going to be tried under this Act. However, no trials were held, and all activities related to the Act ceased after the assassination of Sheikh Mujibur Rahman in 1975.

There are no known instances of criminal investigations or trials outside Bangladesh of alleged perpetrators of war crimes during the 1971 war. Initial steps were taken by the Metropolitan Police to investigate individuals resident in the United Kingdom who were alleged to have committed war crimes according to a Channel 4 documentary film aired in 1995. To date, no charges have been brought against these individuals.

=== 1991–2006 ===
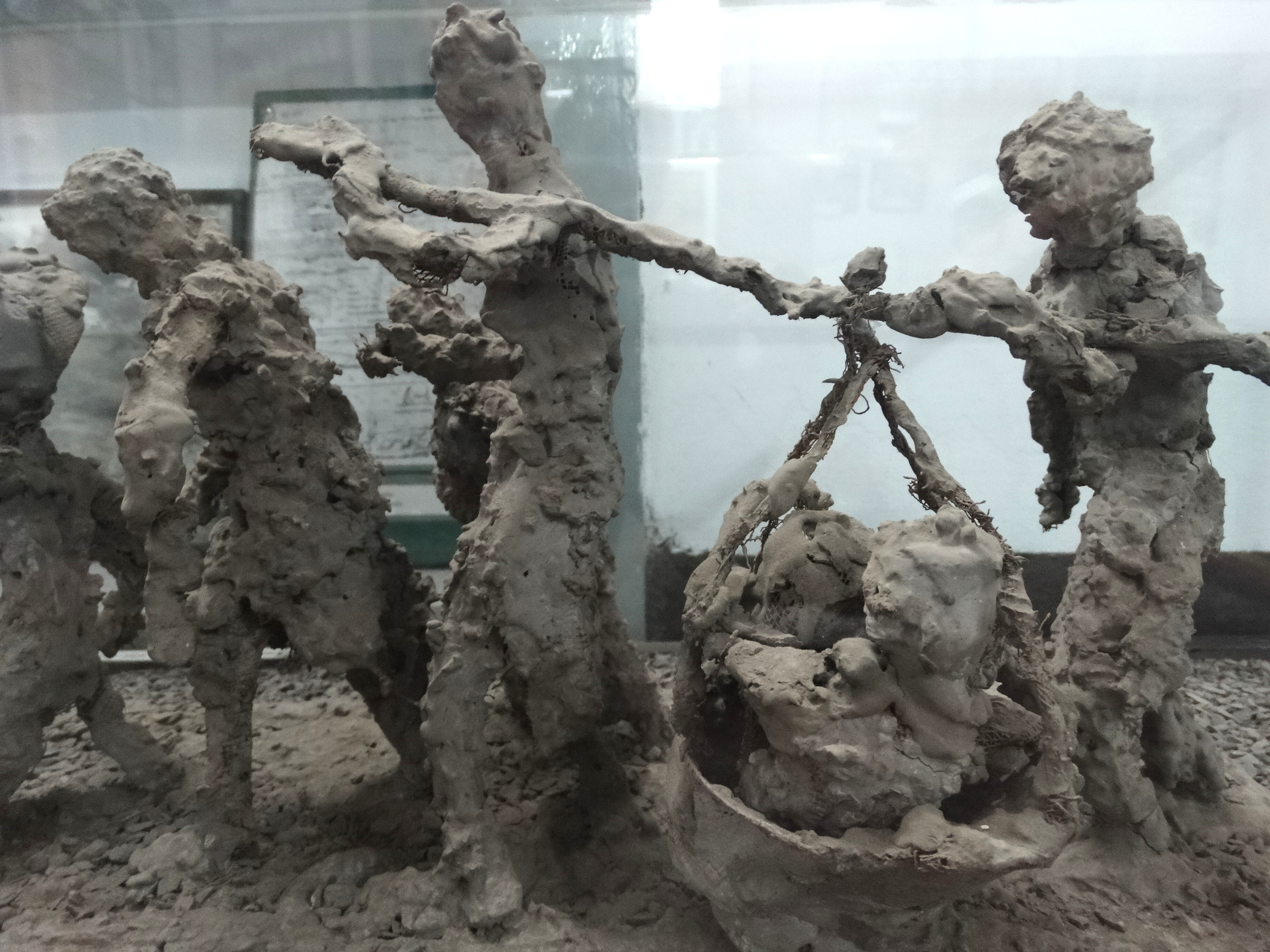
Memorial of clay commemorating refugees from the Bangladesh genocide.

On 29 December 1991, Ghulam Azam, who was accused of being a collaborator with Pakistan in the war of 1971, became the chairman or Ameer of the political party Jamaat-e-Islami of Bangladesh, which caused controversy. This incident prompted the creation of a 'National Committee for Resisting the Killers and Collaborators of 1971', in the footsteps of a proposal by writer and political activist Jahanara Imam. A mock people's court was formed, which on 26 March 1992 found Ghulam Azam guilty in a widely criticised trial, which sentenced him to death; he ultimately died in prison in 2014.

A case was filed in the Federal Court of Australia on 20 September 2006 for alleged crimes of genocide, war crimes and crimes against humanity during 1971 by the Pakistani Armed Forces and its collaborators. Raymond Solaiman & Associates, acting for the plaintiff Mr. Solaiman, released a press statement which among other things said:

We are glad to announce that a case has been filed in the Federal Magistrate's Court of Australia today under the Genocide Conventions Act 1949 and War Crimes Act. This is the first time in history that someone is attending a court proceeding in relation to the [alleged] crimes of Genocide, war crimes and crimes against humanity during 1971 by the Pakistani Armed Forces and its collaborators. The Proceeding number is SYG 2672 of 2006. On 25 October 2006, a direction hearing will take place in the Federal Magistrates Court of Australia, Sydney registry before Federal Magistrate His Honor Nicholls.

On 21 May 2007, at the request of the applicant leave was granted to the applicant to discontinue his application filed on 20 September 2006.

=== 2007–present ===
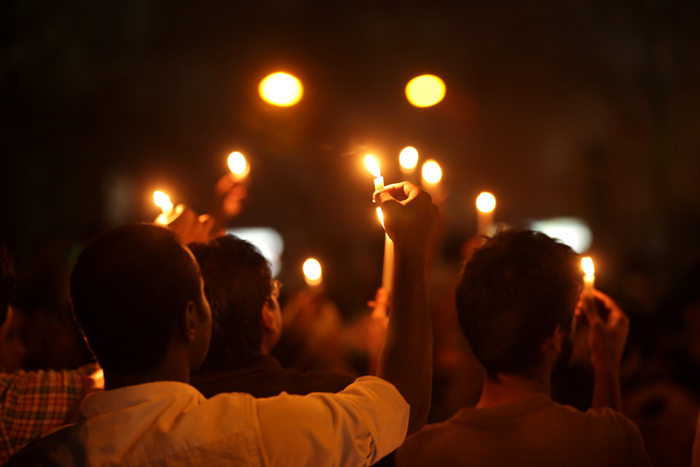
Demonstrators hold a candles for a commemoration of the Bangladesh genocide

On 30 July 2009, the Minister of Law, Justice and Parliamentary Affairs of Bangladesh stated that no Pakistanis would be tried under the International Crimes (Tribunals) Act of 1973. This decision has drawn criticism from international jurists, because it effectively gives immunity to the commanders of the Pakistani Army who are generally considered to be ultimately responsible for the majority of the crimes that were committed in 1971.

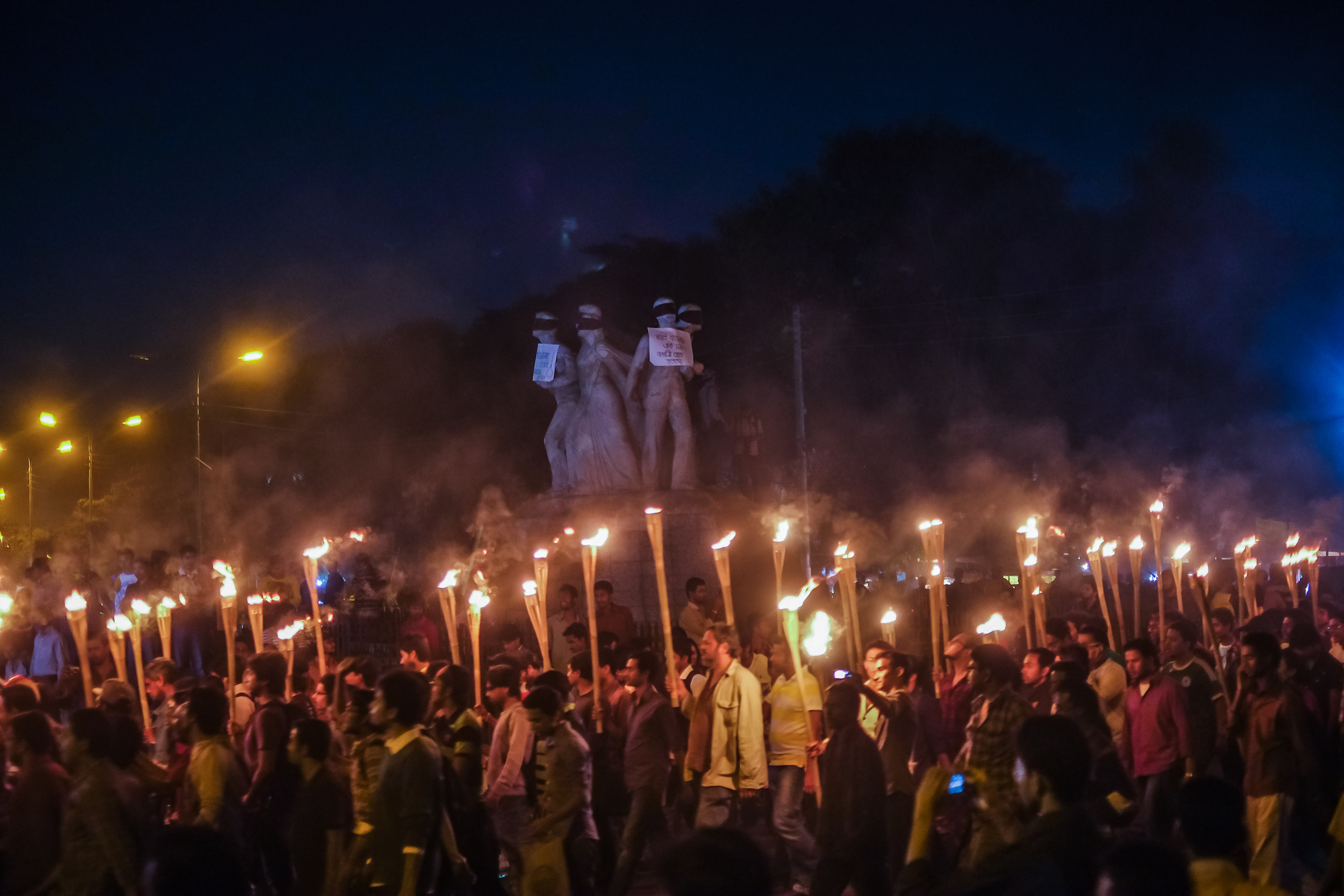
Demonstrators hold torches for a commemoration of the Bangladesh genocide

The International Crimes Tribunal (ICT) is a war crimes tribunal in Bangladesh set up in 2009 to investigate and prosecute suspects for the genocide committed in 1971 by the Pakistan Army and their local collaborators, Razakars, Al-Badr and Al-Shams during the Bangladesh Liberation War. During the 2008 general election, the Awami League (AL) pledged to try war criminals.

The government set up the tribunal after the Awami League won the general election in December 2008 with more than two-thirds majority in parliament. The War Crimes Fact Finding Committee, tasked to investigate and find evidence, completed its report in 2008, identifying 1600 suspects. Prior to the formation of the ICT, the United Nations Development Programme offered assistance in 2009 on the tribunal's formation. In 2009 the parliament amended the 1973 act that authorised such a tribunal to update it.

Throughout the years, tens of thousands of mostly young demonstrators, including women, have called for the death penalty for those convicted of war crimes. Non-violent protests supporting this position have occurred in other cities as the country closely follows the trials. The first indictments were issued in 2010.

By 2012, nine leaders of Jamaat-e-Islami, the largest Islamist party in the nation, and two of the Bangladesh National Party, had been indicted as suspects in war crimes. Three leaders of Jamaat were the first tried; each were convicted of several charges of war crimes. The first person convicted was Abul Kalam Azad, who was tried in absentia as he had left the country; he was sentenced to death in January 2013.

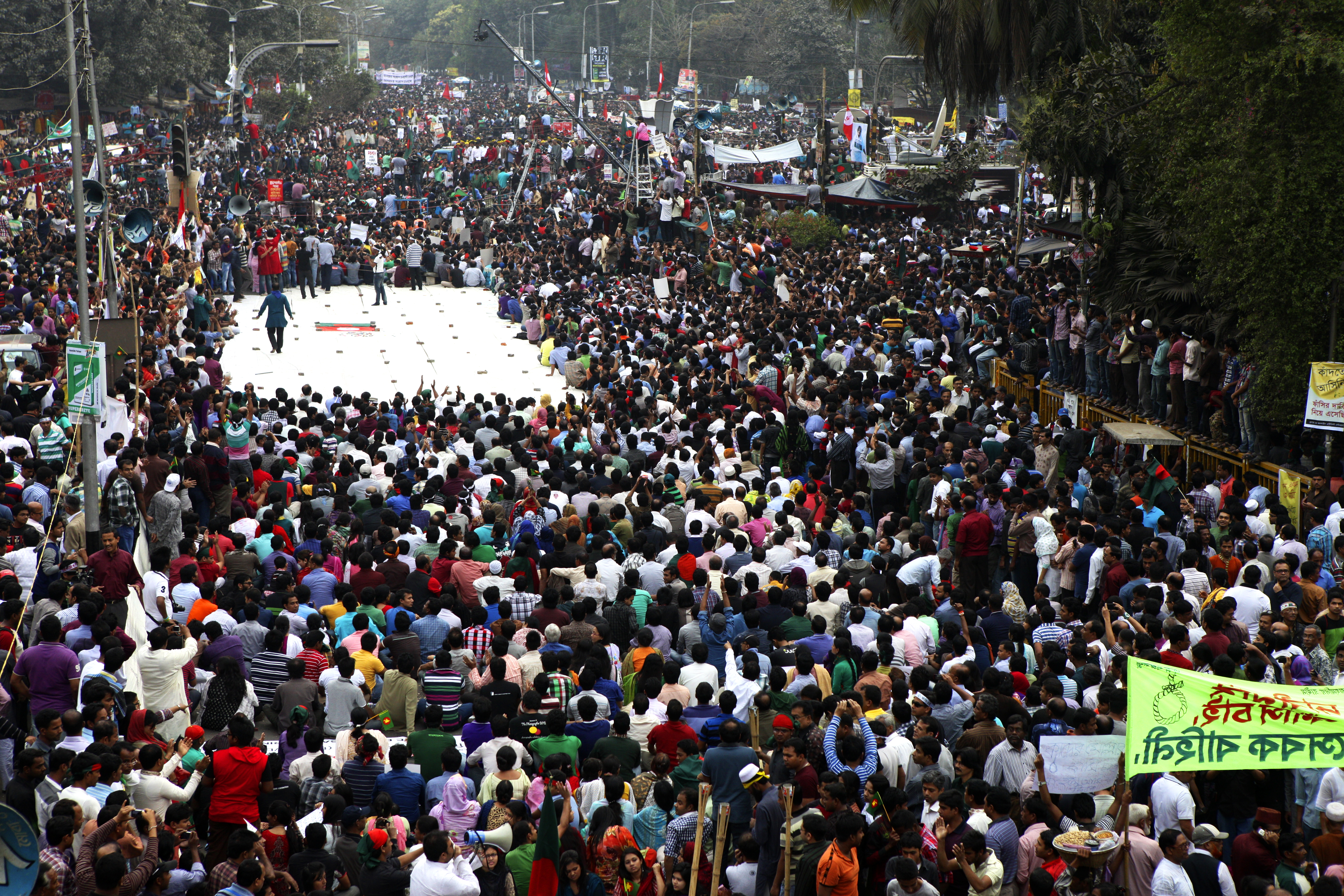
2013 Shahbag protests demanding the death penalty for the war criminals of the 1971 war

While human rights groups and various political entities initially supported the establishment of the tribunal, they have since criticised it on issues of fairness and transparency, as well as reported harassment of lawyers and witnesses representing the accused. Jamaat-e-Islami supporters and their student wing, Islami Chhatra Shibir, called a general strike nationwide on 4 December 2012 in protest against the tribunals. The protest leaders demanded that the tribunal be scrapped permanently and their leaders released immediately.

One of the most high profile verdicts was of Abdul Quader Mollah, assistant secretary general of Jamaat, who was convicted in February 2013 and sentenced to life imprisonment, which culminated in the massive Shahbag protests. The government, although initially reluctant, eventually appealed the verdict in the Supreme Court, which then sentenced Mollah to death. Abdul Quader Mollah was subsequently executed on Thursday 12 December 2013, amidst controversies on the legitimacy of the war tribunal hearings, drawing wide criticisms from countries such as the US, UK and Turkey, as well as from the UN. A period of unrest ensued. The majority of the population, however, was found to be in favour of the execution.

Delwar Hossain Sayeedi was convicted of war crimes due to his involvement in mass killings, rape, arson, looting and forced conversion of Hindus to Islam. He was sentenced to death by hanging; his sentence, however, was later commuted to life imprisonment.

Motiur Rahman Nizami was hanged on 11 May 2015 for 16 charges of genocide, rape and torture.

Salahuddin Quader Chowdhury and Ali Ahsan Mohammad Mujahid, both of whom had been convicted of genocide and rape, were hanged in Dhaka Central Jail shortly after midnight on 22 November 2015.

On 3 December 2016, business tycoon Mir Quasem Ali, convicted of crimes against humanity for torturing and killing suspected Bangladeshi liberationists, was hanged at Kashimpur Prison.

In 2016, a draft of the Digital Security Act was finalized and placed for cabinet approval. The law proposed to declare any propaganda against the War of Liberation as cognizable and non-bailable.

== Views in Pakistan ==
=== Atrocities ===
The Hamoodur Rahman Commission set up by the Pakistani government following the war noted various atrocities committed by the Pakistani military, including: Widespread arson and killings in the countryside; killing of intellectuals and professionals; killing of Bengali military officers and soldiers on the pretence of mutiny; killing Bengali civilian officials, businessmen and industrialists; raping numerous Bengali women as a deliberate act of revenge, retaliation and torture; deliberate killing of members of the Bengali Hindu minority; and the creation of mass graves. The Hamoodur Rahman Commission wrote: "[I]ndiscriminate killing and looting could only serve the cause of the enemies of Pakistan. In the harshness, we lost the support of the silent majority of the people of East Pakistan.... The Comilla Cantonment massacre (on 27th/28th of March, 1971) under the orders of CO 53 Field Regiment, Lt. Gen. Yakub Malik, in which 17 Bengali Officers and 915 men were just slain by a flick of one Officer's fingers should suffice as an example". The commission's report and findings were suppressed by the Pakistani government for more than 30 years, but were leaked to the Indian and Pakistani media in 2000. However, the commission's lowly death toll of 26,000 was criticised as an attempt to whitewash the war.

Several former West Pakistani Army officers who served in Bangladesh during the 1971 war have admitted to large-scale atrocities by their forces.

=== Denial ===
The government of Pakistan continues to deny that the 1971 Bangladesh genocide took place under Pakistan's rule of Bangladesh (East Pakistan) during the Bangladesh Liberation War of 1971. They typically accuse Pakistani reporters (such as Anthony Mascarenhas) who reported on the genocide of being "enemy agents". According to Donald W. Beachler, professor of political science at Ithaca College:

The government of Pakistan explicitly denied that there was genocide. By their refusal to characterise the mass-killings as genocide or to condemn and restrain the Pakistani government, the US and Chinese governments implied that they did not consider it so.

Similarly, in the wake of the 2013 Shahbag protests against war criminals who were complicit in the genocide, English journalist Philip Hensher wrote:

The genocide is still too little known about in the West. It is, moreover, the subject of shocking degrees of denial among partisan polemicists and manipulative historians.

In the 1974 Delhi Agreement, Bangladesh called on Pakistan to prosecute 195 military officers for war crimes, crimes against humanity, and genocide under relevant provisions of international law. Pakistan responded that it "deeply regretted any crimes that may have been committed". It failed to bring the perpetrators to account on its own soil, as requested by Bangladesh. The position taken by Pakistan was reiterated by Zulfikar Ali Bhutto in 1974, when he simply expressed "regret" for 1971, and former Pakistani President Pervez Musharraf in 2002, when he expressed regret for the "excesses" committed in 1971.

The International Crimes Tribunal set up by Bangladesh in 2009 to prosecute surviving collaborators of the pro-Pakistani militias in 1971 has been the subject of strong criticism in Pakistani political and military circles. On 30 November 2015, the government of Prime Minister Nawaz Sharif retreated from earlier positions and said that it denies any role by Pakistan in atrocities in Bangladesh. A statement of the Pakistani Foreign Ministry, after summoning the Acting Bangladeshi High Commissioner, said that "Pakistan also rejected insinuation of complicity in committing crimes or war atrocities. Nothing could be further from the truth". The statement marked a growing trend of genocide denial in Pakistan, which picked up pace after controversial Indian academic Sarmila Bose accused the Mukti Bahini of war crimes. Bose asserts that there is greater denial in Bangladesh of war crimes which were committed by Bengalis against Biharis.

Many in Pakistan's civil society have called for an unconditional apology to Bangladesh and an acknowledgement of the genocide, including former Pakistan Air Force chief Asghar Khan, former Prime Minister Imran Khan, noted journalist Hamid Mir, former Pakistani ambassador to the United States Husain Haqqani, human rights activist Asma Jahangir, cultural activist Salima Hashmi, and defence analyst Muhammad Ali Ehsan. Asma Jahangir has called for an independent United Nations inquiry to investigate the atrocities. Jahangir also described Pakistan's reluctance to acknowledge the genocide a result of the Pakistani Army's dominant influence on foreign policy. She spoke of the need for closure on the 1971 genocide. Pakistani historian Yaqoob Khan Bangash described the actions of the Pakistani Army during the Bangladesh Liberation war as a "rampage".

== Documentaries and films ==
- Stop Genocide (1971)—documentary film
- Major Khaled's war (1971)—documentary film
- Nine Months to Freedom: The Story of Bangladesh (1972)—documentary film
- Children of War (2014)—a film portraying the atrocities in the 1971 Bangladesh genocide
- Merciless Mayhem: The Bangladesh Genocide Through Pakistani Eyes (2018)—TV movie

== See also ==
- 1971 Dhaka University massacre
- Akhira massacre
- Bakhrabad massacre
- Bangladesh Liberation War Library and Research Centre, a digital library, working to "preserve and publicly distribute" the historical documents regarding the Liberation War of Bangladesh and genocide
- Bangladesh Liberation War
- Burunga massacre
- Chuknagar massacre
- The Concert for Bangladesh, the first major benefit concert
- Genocide Remembrance Day
- Jinjira massacre
- Movement demanding trial of war criminals in Bangladesh
