= Krishnapur massacre =

Coordinates: 24.2403°N 91.2148°E

Krishnapur massacre কৃষ্ণপুর গণহত্যা
- Part of Bangladesh genocide
- Location: Krishnapur, Sylhet, East Pakistan
- Date: 18 September 1971 (UTC+6:00)
- Target: Bengali Hindus
- Attack type: Massacre
- Weapon: Rifles
- Deaths: 127
- Perpetrators: Pakistani army, Razakars

Krishnapur massacre (Bengali: কৃষ্ণপুর গণহত্যা) took place on 18 September 1971 in Krishnapur and neighbouring villages in the district of Sylhet in Bangladesh. In Krishnapur, the Pakistani army shot 127 Bengali Hindus to death. In the neighbouring villages more than a 100 Hindus were killed.

== Background ==
Krishnapur was a remote village in the district of Sylhet located in swamp alongside the Balabhadra river. At present the village falls under the Lakhai Upazila, in the south western extremity Habiganj District. Krishnapur is five kilometres to the south of Lakhai police station. To the south of the village runs the Balabhadra river that separates the districts of Habiganj and Brahmanbaria. Krishnapur and the neighbouring Chandipur were Hindu majority villages.

== Killings ==
During the first six months of the Liberation War, the people of Krishnapur had led normal lives. Krishnapur, being a remote area, many Hindus took shelter in the village hoping that it would not be attacked by the Pakistani army. Although the Pakistani Army had taken control of Habiganj and arrived as far as Lakhai, they hadn't proceeded towards Krishnapur. In August, 1971, the Pakistani army committed several war crimes including massacres of the Hindu population in area constituted by present-day Habiganj District. However, after September, the atrocities of the Pakistani Army subsided. However, on 16 September a group of villagers from Krishnapur who had gone to Lakhai were spotted by some boats from Astagram.

On 17 September, the Razakars arrived at the dead of the night in country boats and encircled the entire village. In the early morning hours of 18 September, between 4 AM and 5 AM, a group of Pakistani soldiers arrived at Krishnapur from Astagram camp in Kishoreganj. The Pakistani contingent arrived in two speedboats in two groups. One group of soldiers alighted from the boat and started firing indiscriminately as they entered the village. The other group patrolled around the village the speedboat. At this time, the Razakars too began to fire as they entered the village and started looting. They went from door to door and robbed the villagers of their cash and jewellery at gunpoint. The Pakistani soldiers, incited by the Razakars, set fire to all the houses of the village. Then they rounded up 130 men in front of the Kamalamayee High School. The men were made to stand in a line and burst fired. Pramod Ray, Nabadwip Ray and Haridas Ray survived with bullet wounds after being shot. They were handicapped for the rest of their lives. In the Chandipur locality, there were only 16 families, all of whom were made to stand in a line and burst fired. 45 Hindus were killed. Only two persons survived the massacre. In Lalchanpur locality, 40 Hindus were rounded up in the residence of Madhu Namashudra. After being robbed, they were made to stand in a line and shot to death. Hindus were similarly shot dead in Gokulnagar.

== Investigation ==
On 4 March 2010, survivor named Haridas Ray filed a lawsuit against Liakat Ali and other Razakars at the Habiganj District Magistrate Court. Liakat Ali is from Morakari village, Lakhai Upazila, Habiganj District and the President of Lakhai Upazila Awami League. Soon after filing the lawsuit, Ray began to receive death threats from the Razakars. On 7 June 2010, he filed a general diary in the police station. On 12 August 2010, the Krishnapur massacre was taken up as the first case of crime against humanity by the International Crimes Tribunal from the Sylhet Division.
