= Rape during the Bangladesh Liberation War =

Pakistani atrocities during the 1971 Bangladesh genocide

During the Bangladesh Liberation War in 1971, members of the Pakistani military and Razakar paramilitary force raped between 200,000 and 400,000 Bengali women and girls in a systematic campaign of genocidal rape. Some of these women died in captivity or committed suicide, while others moved from East Pakistan (now Bangladesh) to India.

Both Bengali Muslim and Bengali Hindu women were targeted for rape. West Pakistani men wanted to cleanse a nation corrupted by the presence of Hindus and believed that the sacrifice of Hindu women was needed. Given that Bengali culture itself was seen as inherently oversaturated with Hindu influence, Bengali women, Hindu and Muslim, were viewed as being either outright Hindus or Muslims in name yet Hindus in essence, respectively. These rapes caused thousands of pregnancies, births of war babies, abortions, infanticide, suicide, and ostracism of the victims, in what has been often asserted to be one of the most severe occurrences of wartime sexual violence in modern history. The atrocities ended after the December 1971 surrender of the Pakistani military and supporting Razakar militias.

During the war, Bengali nationalists also raped ethnic Bihari Muslim women, since the Bihari Muslim community was accused of being supportive of Pakistan. Bengali Muslim men were targets of rape by West Pakistani soldiers as well.

In 2009, almost 40 years after the events of 1971, a report published by the War Crimes Fact Finding Committee of Bangladesh accused 1,597 people of war crimes, including rape. Since 2010, the International Crimes Tribunal (ICT) has indicted, tried, and sentenced several people to life imprisonment or death for their actions during the conflict. The stories of the rape victims have been told in movies and literature, and depicted in art. The term Birangana was first introduced in 1971 by Sheikh Mujibur Rahman to refer to victims of rape during the Bangladesh Liberation War, in an attempt to prevent them from being outcast by the society. Since 1972, victims of rape during the war have been recognised as Birangona, or "war heroines", by the government of Bangladesh.

== Background ==
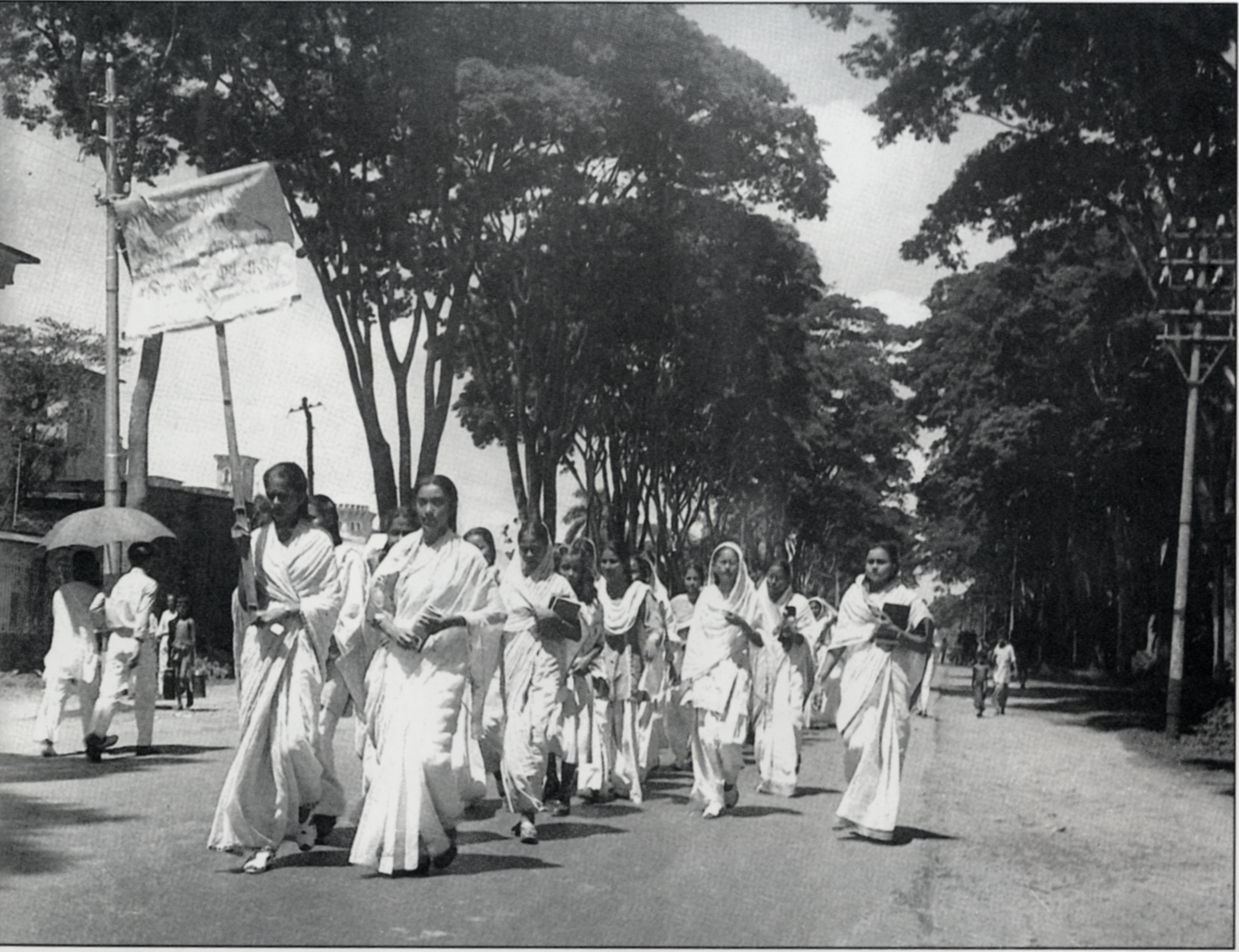
Female students of Dacca University marching on Language Movement Day, 21 February 1953

Following the partition of India and the creation of Pakistan, the East and West wings were separated not only geographically but also culturally. The authorities of the west viewed the Bengali Muslims in the East as "too Bengali" and their application of Islam as "inferior and impure", and this made them unreliable. To this extent, the West began a strategy to forcibly assimilate the Bengalis culturally. The Bengalis of East Pakistan were chiefly Muslim, but their numbers were interspersed with a significant Hindu minority. Very few spoke Urdu, which in 1948 had been declared the national language of Pakistan. To express their opposition, activists in East Pakistan founded the Bengali language movement. Earlier in 1949, other activists had founded the Awami League as an alternative to the ruling Muslim League in West Pakistan. In the next decade and a half, Bengalis became gradually disenchanted with the balance of power in Pakistan, which was under military rule during much of this time; eventually some began to call for secession. By the late 1960s, a perception had emerged that the people of East Pakistan were second-class citizens. It did not help that General A. A. K. Niazi, head of Pakistani Forces in East Pakistan, called East Pakistan a "low-lying land of low, lying people".

There had been opposition to military rule in West Pakistan as well. Eventually the military relented, and in December 1970 elections were held. To the surprise of many, East Pakistan's Awami League, headed by Sheikh Mujibur Rahman, won a clear majority. The West Pakistani establishment was displeased with the results. In Dacca, following the election, a general said, "Don't worry, we will not allow these black bastards to rule over us". Soon President Yahya Khan banned the Awami League and declared martial law in East Pakistan.

With the goal of putting down Bengali nationalism, the Pakistan Army launched Operation Searchlight on 25 March 1971. The Pakistani forces targeted both Bengali Muslims and Hindus. In the ensuing 1971 Bangladesh genocide, the army caused the deaths of up to 3 million people, created up to 10 million refugees who fled to India, and displaced a further 30 million within East Pakistan.

Rounaq Jahan alleges elements of racism in the Pakistan army, who he says considered the Bengalis "racially inferior—a non-martial and physically weak race", and has accused the army of using organised rape as a weapon of war. This notion of the Pakistan army found its origin in the martial race classifications of British colonial rule, wherein ethnicities such as Punjabis and Pashtuns were categorized during the Raj as "martial races" and Bengalis as non-martial. According to the political scientist R. J. Rummel, the Pakistani army looked upon the Bengalis as "subhuman" and viewed the Hindus "as Jews to the Nazis: scum and vermin that best be exterminated". This racism was then expressed in that the Bengalis, being inferior, must have their gene pool "fixed" through forcible impregnation. Belén Martín Lucas has described the rapes as "ethnically motivated".

== Pakistani Army actions ==
The attacks were led by General Tikka Khan, who was the architect of Operation Searchlight and was given the name the "butcher of Bengal" by the Bengalis for his actions. Khan said—when reminded on 27 March 1971 that he was in charge of a majority province—"I will reduce this majority to a minority". Bina D'Costa believes an anecdote used by Khan is significant, in that it provides proof of the mass rapes being a deliberate strategy. In Jessore, while speaking with a group of journalists, Khan was reported to have said, "Pehle inko Mussalman karo" (lit. 'First, make them Muslims'). D'Costa argues that this shows that in the highest echelons of the armed forces, the Bengalis were perceived as being disloyal Muslims and unpatriotic Pakistanis.

Both Muslim and Hindu women were targeted for rape. West Pakistani men wanted to cleanse a nation corrupted by the presence of Hindus and believed that the sacrifice of Hindu women was needed; Bengali women were thus viewed as Hindu or Hindu-like. Imams, mullahs, and a fatwa from West Pakistan declared that Bengali women could be handled as gonimoter maal ("war booty" or "public property"). Susan Brownmiller wrote that 80 percent of raped women were Muslims, matching the demographics of Bangladesh, although Christian Gerlach stated that this "has no clear basis". According to D'Costa, Bengali women were indiscriminately raped by the army, though Muslim women were forcibly impregnated while Hindu women were often killed after being raped. Salil Tripathi wrote that almost all of the rape victims he interviewed were Muslim, contrary to claims that Hindu women were especially targeted. Lisa Sharlach wrote that rape victims were primarily Bengali women "of all castes and religions", but that girls may have been spared if they could recite Muslim prayers. M. Rafiqul Islam described Hindu women and girls as the main targets for rape and sexual violence.

The perpetrators conducted nighttime raids, assaulting women in their villages, often in front of their families, as part of the terror campaign. Victims were also kidnapped and held in special camps where they were repeatedly assaulted. Many of those held in the camps were murdered or committed suicide, with some taking their own lives by using their hair to hang themselves; the soldiers responded to these suicides by cutting the women's hair off. Time magazine reported on 563 girls who had been kidnapped and held by the military; all of them were between three and five months pregnant when the military began to release them. Some women were forcibly used as prostitutes. While the Pakistani government estimated the number of rapes in the hundreds, other estimates range between 200,000 and 400,000.

In what has been described by Jenneke Arens as a deliberate attempt to destroy an ethnic group, many of those assaulted were raped, murdered, and then bayoneted in the genitalia. Adam Jones, a political scientist, has said that one of the reasons for the mass rapes was to undermine Bengali society through the "dishonoring" of Bengali women and that some women were raped until they died or were killed following repeated attacks. The International Commission of Jurists concluded that the atrocities carried out by the Pakistani armed forces "were part of a deliberate policy by a disciplined force". The writer Mulk Raj Anand said the rapes were too widespread and systematic to be anything but conscious military policy, "planned by the West Pakistanis in a deliberate effort to create a new race" or to undermine Bengali separatism. Amita Malik, reporting from Bangladesh following the Pakistan armed forces surrender, wrote that one West Pakistani soldier said, "We are going. But we are leaving our seed behind".

Not all Pakistani military personnel supported the violence: General Sahabzada Yaqub Khan and Mitty Masud, who advised the president against military action, and Major Ikram Sehgal, had all resigned in protest. Former Air Marshal Asghar Khan, a Pashtun politician and leader of the Tehreek-e-Istiqlal; Ghaus Bakhsh Bizenjo, a Balochi politician; and Khan Abdul Wali Khan, leader of the National Awami Party, protested over the actions of the armed forces. Those imprisoned for their dissenting views on the violence included Sabihuddin Ghausi and I. A. Rahman, who were both journalists; the Sindhi leader G. M. Syed; the poet Ahmad Salim; Anwar Pirzado, who was a member of the air force; Professor M. R. Hassan; Tahera Mazhar; and Imtiaz Ahmed. Malik Ghulam Jilani, who was also arrested, had openly opposed the armed action in the East; a letter he had written to Yahya Khan was widely publicised. Altaf Hussain Gauhar, the editor of the Dawn newspaper, was also imprisoned. In 2013 Jilani and Faiz Ahmad Faiz, a poet, were honoured by the Bangladeshi government for their actions.

=== Militias ===
According to Peter Tomsen, a political scientist, Pakistan's secret service, the Directorate for Inter-Services Intelligence, in conjunction with the political party Jamaat-e-Islami, formed militias such as Al-Badr ("the moon") and the Al-Shams ("the sun") to conduct operations against the nationalist movement. These militias targeted non-combatants and committed rapes as well as other crimes. Local collaborators known as Razakars also took part in the atrocities. The term has since become a pejorative akin to the Western term "Judas".

Members of the Muslim League, such as Nizam-e-Islam, Jamaat-e-Islami, and Jamiat Ulema Pakistan, who had lost the election, collaborated with the military and acted as an intelligence organisation for them. Members of Jamaat-e-Islami and some of its leaders collaborated with the Pakistani forces in rapes and targeted killings. The atrocities by Al-Badr and the Al-Shams garnered worldwide attention from news agencies; accounts of massacres and rapes were widely reported.

== International reaction ==
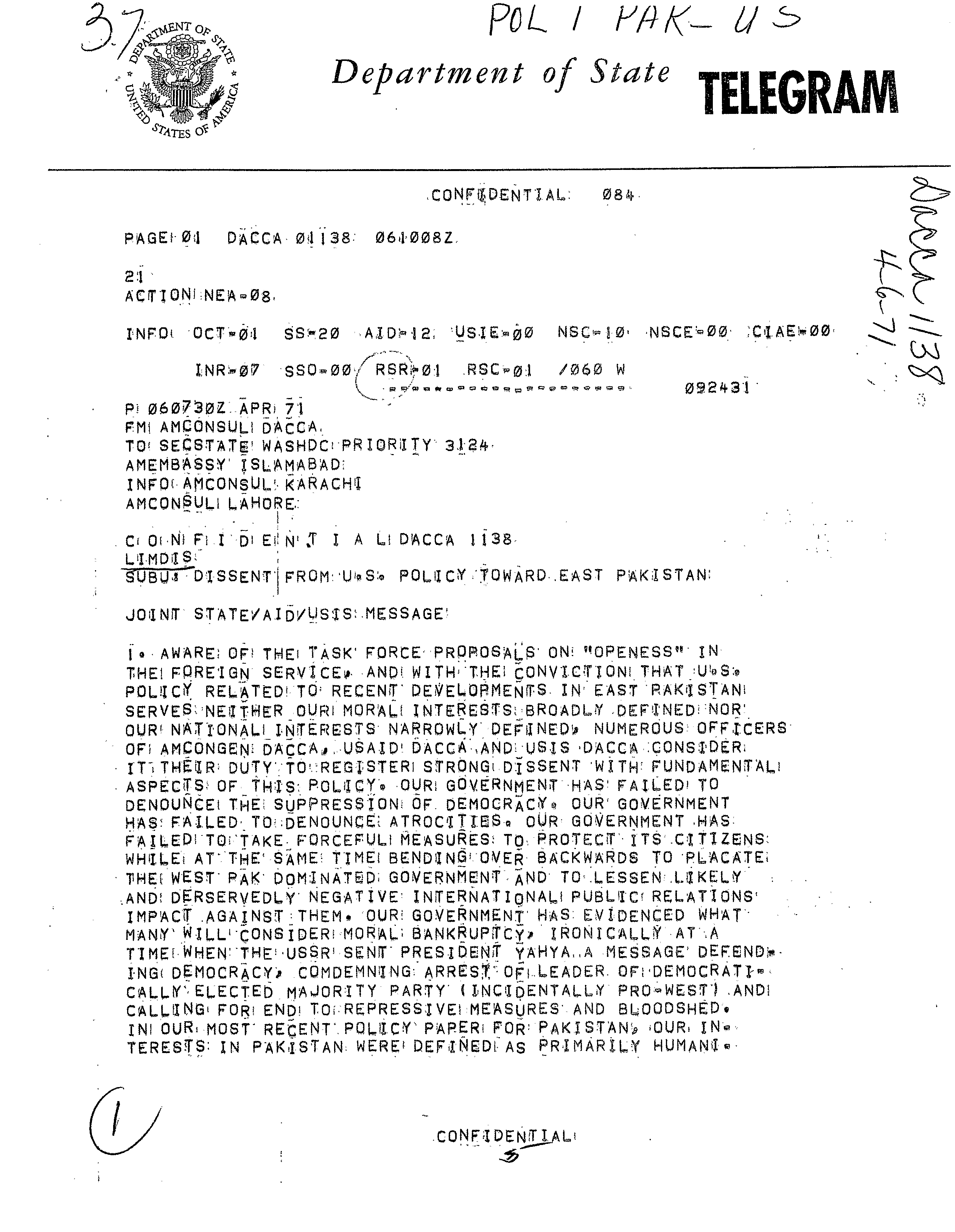
The Blood telegram, sent on 6 April 1971

There is an academic consensus that the events of the nine-month conflict were a genocide. The atrocities in East Pakistan were the first instances of war rape to attract international media attention, and Sally J. Scholz has written that this was the first genocide to capture the interest of the mass media. The women's human rights organisation Bangladesh Mahila Parishat took part in the war by publicising the atrocities being carried out by the Pakistani army.

Owing to the scale of the atrocities, US embassy staff had sent telegrams indicating that a genocide was occurring. One, which became known as the Blood telegram, was sent by Archer Blood, the US Consul General in Dhaka, and was signed by him as well as US officials from USAID and USIS who at the time were serving in Dhaka. In it, the signatories denounced American "complicity in Genocide". In an interview in 1972, Indira Gandhi, the Indian prime minister, justified the use of military intervention, saying, "Shall we sit and watch their women get raped?" The events were discussed extensively in the British House of Commons. John Stonehouse proposed a motion supported by a further 200 members of parliament condemning the atrocities being carried out by the Pakistani armed forces. Although this motion was presented twice before parliament, the government did not find time to debate it.

Before the end of the war, the international community had begun to provide aid in large quantities to the refugees living in India. Although humanitarian aid was given, there was little support for the war crimes trials that Bangladesh proposed at the end of the war. Critics of the United Nations have used the atrocities of 1971 to argue that military intervention was the only thing to stop the mass murder. Writing to The New York Times, a group of women said in response to women being shunned by family and husbands, "It is unthinkable that innocent wives whose lives were virtually destroyed by war are now being totally destroyed by their own husbands". International aid was also forthcoming owing to the issue of war rape.

== Aftermath ==
In the immediate aftermath of the war, one pressing problem was the very high number of unwanted pregnancies of rape victims. Estimates of the number of pregnancies resulting in births range from 25,000 to the Bangladeshi government's figure of 70,000, while one publication by the Centre for Reproductive Law and Policy gave a total of 250,000. A government-mandated victim relief programme was set up with the support of the World Health Organization and the International Planned Parenthood Federation, among whose goals it was to organise abortion facilities to help rape victims terminate unwanted pregnancies. A doctor at a rehabilitation centre in Dhaka reported 170,000 abortions of pregnancies caused by the rapes, and the births of 30,000 war babies during the first three months of 1972. Dr. Geoffrey Davis, an Australian doctor and abortion specialist who worked for the programme, estimated that there had been about 5,000 cases of self-induced abortions. He also said that during his work he heard of numerous infanticides and suicides by victims. His estimate of the total number of rape victims was 400,000, twice as high as the official estimate of 200,000 cited by the Bangladeshi government. Most of the victims also contracted sexual infections. Many suffered from feelings of intense shame and humiliation, and a number were ostracised by their families and communities or committed suicide.

The feminist writer Cynthia Enloe has written that some pregnancies were intended by the soldiers and perhaps their officers as well. A report from the International Commission of Jurists said, "Whatever the precise numbers, the teams of American and British surgeons carrying out abortions and the widespread government efforts to persuade people to accept these girls into the community, testify to the scale on which raping occurred". The commission also said that Pakistani officers not only allowed their men to rape, but enslaved women themselves.

Following the conflict, the rape victims were seen as a symbol of "social pollution" and shame. Few were able to return to families or old homes because of this. Sheikh Mujibur Rahman called the victims birangona ("heroine"), but this served as a reminder that these women were now deemed socially unacceptable as they were "dishonored", (Note: "Rape can be especially effective as a tactic of genocide when used against females of communities that cast shame upon the rape victim rather than the rapist. In such communities, the rape forever damages the social standing of the survivor. Bengali girls and women who endured the genocidal rape had to cope not only with their physical injuries and trauma, but with a society hostile to violated women. The blame for loss of honour falls not upon the rapist, but upon the raped.".) and the term became associated with barangona ("prostitute"). The official strategy of marrying the women off and encouraging them to be seen as war heroines failed as few men came forward, and those who did expected the state to provide a large dowry. Those women who did marry were usually mistreated, and the majority of men, once having received a dowry, abandoned their wives.

On 18 February 1972, the state formed the Bangladesh Women's Rehabilitation Board, which was tasked with helping the victims of rape and helping with the adoption programme. Several international agencies took part in the adoption programme, such as Mother Teresa's Sisters of Charity. The majority of the war babies were adopted in the Netherlands and Canada, as the state wished to remove the reminders of Pakistan from the newly formed nation. However, not all women wanted their child taken, and some were forcibly removed and sent for adoption, a practice that was encouraged by Rahman, who said, "I do not want those polluted blood [sic] in this country". While many women were glad for the abortion programme, as they did not have to bear a child conceived of rape, others had to go full term, filled with hatred towards the child they carried. Others, who had their children adopted out so as to return to "mainstream life", would not look at their newborn as it was taken from them. In the 1990s, many of these children returned to Bangladesh to search for their birth mothers. In 2008, D'Costa attempted to find those who had been adopted, however very few responded. One who did said, "I hated being a kid, and I am angry at Bangladesh for not taking care of me when I needed it most. I don't have any roots and that makes me cry. So that is why I am trying to learn more about where I was born."

Forty years after the war, two sisters who had been raped were interviewed by Deutsche Welle. Aleya stated she had been taken by the Pakistani army when she was thirteen, and was gang raped repeatedly for seven months. She states she was tortured and was five months pregnant when she returned to her home. Her sister, Laily, says she was pregnant when she was taken by the armed forces, and lost the child. Later she fought alongside the Mukti Bahini. Both say that the state has failed the birangona, and that all they received was "humiliation, insults, hatred, and ostracism."

=== Pakistani government reaction ===
After the conflict, the Pakistani government decided on a policy of silence regarding the rapes. They set up the Hamoodur Rahman Commission, a judicial commission to prepare an account of the circumstances surrounding Pakistan's loss of the 1971 war. The commission was highly critical of the army. The chiefs of staff of the army and the Pakistan Air Force were removed from their positions for attempting to interfere with the commission. The commission based its reports on interviews with politicians, officers, and senior commanders. The final reports were submitted in July 1972, but all were subsequently destroyed except for one held by Zulfikar Ali Bhutto, the Pakistani president. The findings were never made public.

In 1974, the commission was reopened and issued a supplementary report, which remained classified for 25 years until published by the magazine India Today. The report said that 26,000 people were killed, rapes numbered in the hundreds, and the Mukti Bahini rebels engaged in widespread rape and other human rights abuses. Sumit Ganguly, a political scientist, believes that the Pakistani establishment has yet to come to terms with the atrocities carried out, saying that, in a visit to Bangladesh in 2002, Pervez Musharraf expressed regret for the atrocities rather than accepting responsibility.

=== War Crimes prosecutions ===
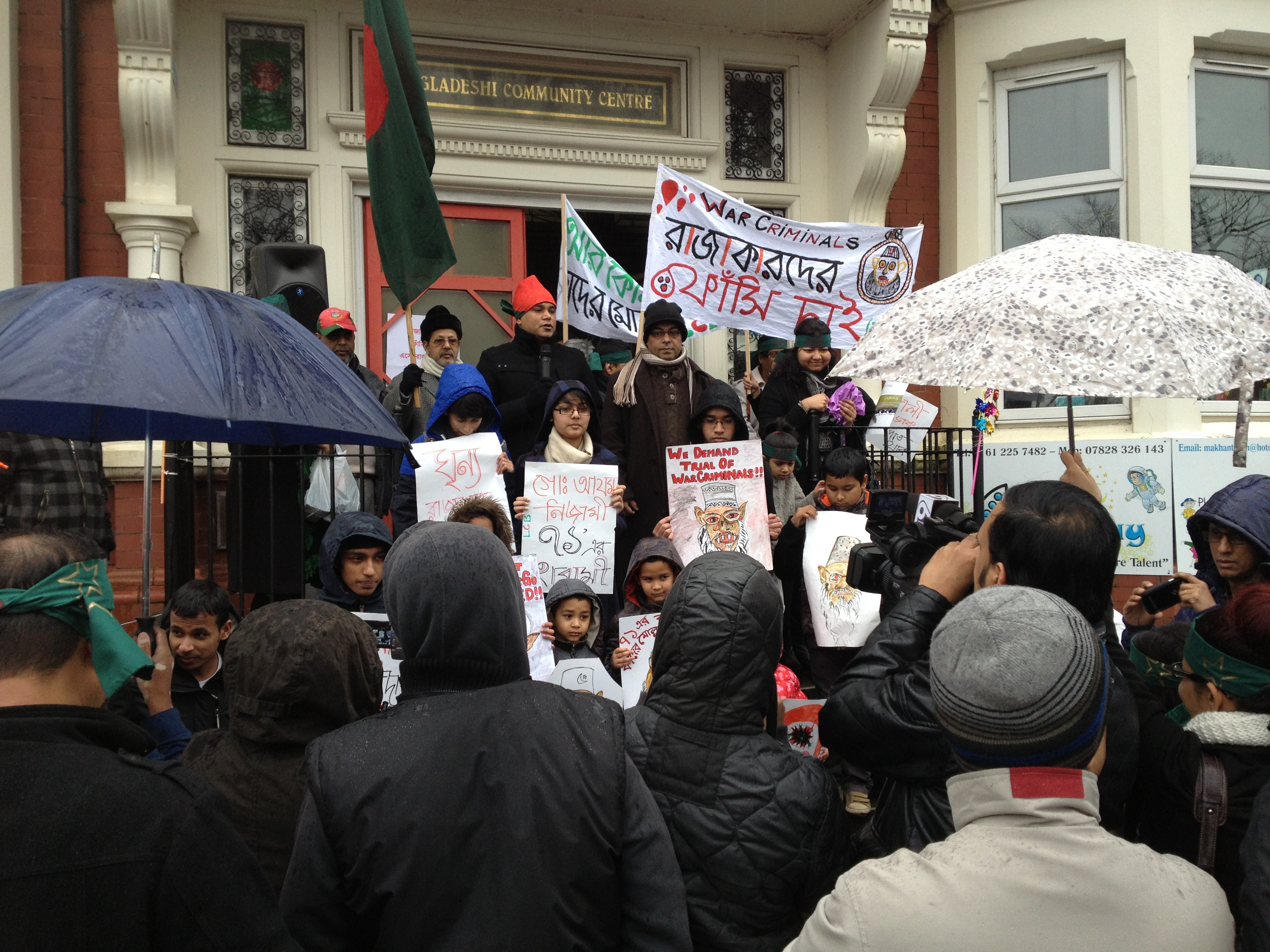
Bangladeshis in Manchester, in the United Kingdom, expressing solidarity with the 2013 Shahbagh Protest, which is demanding more rigorous punishment for those convicted of war crimes in 1971.

In 2008, after a 17-year investigation, the War Crimes Fact Finding Committee released documentation identifying 1,597 people who had taken part in the atrocities. The list included members of the Jamaat-e-Islami and the Bangladesh Nationalist Party, a political group founded in 1978. In 2010, the government of Bangladesh set up the International Crimes Tribunal (ICT) to investigate the atrocities of that era. While Human Rights Watch has been supportive of the tribunal, it has also been critical of reported harassment of lawyers representing the accused. Brad Adams, director of the Asia branch of Human Rights Watch, has said that those accused must be given the full protection of the law to avoid the risk of the trials not being taken seriously, and Irene Khan, a human rights activist, has expressed doubt about whether the mass rapes and killings of women will be addressed. Khan has said of her government's reaction:

A conservative Muslim society has preferred to throw a veil of negligence and denial on the issue, allowed those who committed or colluded with gender violence to thrive, and left the women victims to struggle in anonymity and shame and without much state or community support.

The deputy leader of Jamaat-e-Islami, Delwar Hossain Sayeedi, the first person to face charges related to the conflict, was indicted by the ICT on twenty counts of war crimes, which included murder, rape, and arson. He denied all charges. On 28 February 2013, Sayeedi was found guilty of genocide, rape, and religious persecution, and was sentenced to death by hanging. Four other members of Jamaat-e-Islami Bangladesh, including Motiur Rahman Nizami, have also been indicted for war crimes. Abul Kalam Azad, a member of the Razakars, was the first person to be sentenced for crimes during the war. He was found guilty of murder and rape in absentia, and was sentenced to death. Muhammad Kamaruzzaman, senior assistant secretary general of Bangladesh Jamaat-e-Islami, faced seven charges of war crimes, including planning and advising on the rape of women in the village of Shohaghpur on 25 July 1971. The ICT sentenced him to death by hanging on 9 May 2013. In July 2013, Ghulam Azam was given a ninety-year sentence for rape and mass murder during the conflict. Abdul Quader Molla, a member of the Razakar militia during the war, was charged with abetting the Pakistani army and actively participating in the 1971 Bangladesh atrocities: rape (including the rape of minors) and mass murder of Bangladeshis in the Mirpur area of Dhaka during the Bangladesh Liberation War. After the government had amended the war crimes law to allow a sentence to be appealed based on leniency of punishment, prosecutors appealed to the Supreme Court of Bangladesh and asked for it to upgrade Molla's sentence from life in prison to death. On 17 September 2013, the Supreme Court accepted the appeal and sentenced Molla to death. Finally he was hanged in Dhaka Central Jail on 12 December 2013 at 22:01.

== In literature and media ==
A photograph taken during the conflict of a woman who had been assaulted featured in an exhibition in London. Titled Shamed Woman, but also called Brave Woman, the image was taken by a Bangladeshi photographer, Naib Uddin Ahmed. The image is considered by John Tulloch to be as "classical a pose as any Madonna and Child". One of the more emotive photographs at the exhibition, the woman has her hands clenched, her face completely covered by her hair. Tulloch describes the image as having the "Capability to reveal or suggest what is unsayable".

Orunodoyer Ognishakhi (Pledge to a New Dawn), the first film about the war, was screened in 1972 on the first Bangladeshi Independence Day celebration. It draws on the experiences of an actor called Altaf. While trying to reach safe haven in Calcutta, he encounters women who have been raped. The images of these birangona, stripped and vacant-eyed from the trauma, are used as testimony to the assault. Other victims Altaf meets are shown committing suicide or having lost their minds.

In 1995 Gita Sahgal produced the documentary War Crimes File, which was screened on Channel 4. In 2011 the film Meherjaan was shown at the Guwahati International Film Festival. It explores the war from two perspectives: that of a woman who loved a Pakistani soldier and that of a person born from rape.

In 1994, the book Ami Birangana Bolchi (The Voices of War Heroines) by Nilima Ibrahim was released. It is a collection of eyewitness testimony from seven rape victims, which Ibrahim documented while working in rehabilitation centres. The narratives of the survivors in this work are heavily critical of post-war Bangladeshi society's failure to support the victims of rape.

Published in 2012, the book Rising from the Ashes: Women's Narratives of 1971 includes oral testimonies of women affected by the Liberation War. As well as an account from Taramon Bibi, who fought and was awarded the Bir Protik (Symbol of Valour) for her actions, there are nine interviews with women who were raped. The book's publication in English at the time of the fortieth anniversary of the war was noted in The New York Times as an "important oral history".

The 2014 film Children of War portrays sexual violence during the war. The film by Mrityunjay Devvrat, starring Farooq Sheikh, Victor Banerjee, Raima Sen, among others, is meant to "send shivers down the viewers' spine. We want to make it so repulsive that no one even entertains the thought of pardoning rapists, let alone commit the crime. The shoot took its toll on all of us."

== Bibliography ==
- Adams, Brad (18 May 2011). "Letter to the Bangladesh Prime Minister regarding the International Crimes (Tribunals) Act". Human Rights Watch.
- Adams, Brad (2 November 2011). "Bangladesh: Stop Harassment of Defense at War Tribunal". Thomson Reuters Foundation. Archived from the original on 11 March 2016.
- Ahmed, Tanim; Haq, Quazi Shahreen; Niloy, Suliman; Dhrubo, Golam Muztaba (9 May 2013). "Kamaruzzaman to hang". BD News 24.
- Alffram, Henrik (2009). Ignoring Executions and Torture: Impunity for Bangladesh's Security Forces. Human Rights Watch. ISBN 978-1-56432-483-2.
- Arens, Jenneke (2010). "Genocide in the Chittagong Hill Tracts, Bangladesh". In Samuel Totten; Robert K. Hitchcock (eds.). Genocide of Indigenous Peoples. Transaction. pp. 117–142. ISBN 978-1-4128-1495-9.
- Ball, Howard (2011). Genocide: A Reference Handbook. ABC Clio. ISBN 978-1-59884-488-7.
- "Bangla movie Meherjan to be screened today". Assam Tribune. 10 February 2011. Archived from the original on 1 April 2019.
- "Bangladesh Jamaat leader sentenced to death". Al Jazeera. 28 February 2013. Archived from the original on 6 July 2017.
- Bartrop, Paul R.; Jacobs, Steven Leonard (2014). Modern Genocide: The Definitive Resource and Document Collection. ABC-CLIO. pp. 1866–. ISBN 978-1-61069-364-6.
- Biswas, Rajiv (2012). Future Asia: The New Gold Rush in the East. Palgrave Macmillan. ISBN 978-1-137-02721-4.
- Brownmiller, Susan (2007). "Against our will". In William F. Schulz (ed.). The Phenomenon of Torture: Readings and Commentary. University of Pennsylvania Press. pp. 88–94. ISBN 978-0-8122-1982-1.
- Brownmiller, Susan (1975). Against Our Will: Men, Women and Rape. Ballantine. ISBN 978-0-449-90820-4.
- Chalk, Frank; Jonassohn, Kurt (1990). The History and Sociology of Genocide: Analyses and Case Studies (3rd ed.). Yale University Press. ISBN 978-0-300-04446-1.
- Coggin, Dan (25 October 1971). "East Pakistan: Even the Skies Weep". Time. Vol. 98. p. 157.
- Das, Bijoyeta (28 June 2011). "Rape victims or war heroes: war women in Bangladesh". Deutsche Welle.
- D'Costa, Bina (2010). Nationbuilding, Gender and War Crimes in South Asia. Routledge. ISBN 978-0-415-56566-0.
- D'Costa, Bina (December 2008). "Victory's silence". Himal Magazine. Archived from the original on 19 October 2013.
- D'Costa, Bina (2011). Nationbuilding, Gender and War Crimes in South Asia. Routledge. ISBN 978-0-415-56566-0.
- D'Costa, Bina (15 December 2010). "1971: Rape and its Consequences". bdnews24.com (Opinion). Archived from the original on 2 August 2019.
- Debnath, Angela (2009). "The Bangladesh genocide: The plight of women". In Samuel Totten (ed.). Plight and Fate of Women During and Following Genocide. Transaction. pp. 47–66. ISBN 978-1-4128-0827-9.
- "BD award for Faiz, Malik Jilani". Dawn. Pakistan. 9 March 2013.
- Enloe, Cynthia H. (2000). Maneuvers: The International Politics of Militarizing Women's Lives. University of California Press. ISBN 978-0-520-22071-3.
- Friend, Theodore (2011). Woman, Man, and God in Modern Islam. Wm. B. Eerdmans. ISBN 978-0-8028-6673-8.
- Ganguly, Sumit (2010). "Pakistan: Neither state nor nation". In Jacques Bertrand; André Laliberté (eds.). Multination States in Asia: Accommodation or Resistance. Cambridge University Press. ISBN 978-0-521-14363-9.
- Gerlach, Christian (2010). Extremely Violent Societies: Mass Violence in the Twentieth-Century World. Cambridge University Press. ISBN 978-0-521-70681-0.
- Ghadbian, Najib (2002). "Political Islam: Inclusion or violence?". In Kent Worcester; Sally A. Bermanzohn; Mark Ungar (eds.). Violence and Politics: Globalization's Paradox. Routledge. ISBN 978-0-415-93111-3.
- Gotam, Nachiketa (1971). The Traitors of Pakistan. Press & Publication Agency. OCLC 657534665.
- Hagerty, Devin T.; Ganguly, Šumit (2005). Fearful Symmetry: India-Pakistan Crises in the Shadow of Nuclear Weapons. University of Washington Press. ISBN 978-0-295-98635-7.
- "Business of the House". Hansard. 819. House of Commons. 17 June 1971.
- Ḥaqqānī, Ḥusain (2005). Pakistan: Between Mosque and Military. Carnegie. ISBN 978-0-87003-214-1.
- Heinze, Eric (2009). Waging Humanitarian War. SUNY. pp. 350–358. ISBN 978-0-7914-7695-6.
- Hossain, Tania; Tollefson, James W. (2006). "Language policy in education in Bangladesh". In Amy Tsui; James W. Tollefson (eds.). Language Policy, Culture, and Identity in Asian Contexts. Routledge. ISBN 978-0-8058-5693-4.
- Huq, M. Zahurul (2011). "Case against Delwar Hossain Sayeedi". In Michael N. Schmitt; Louise Arimatsu; T. McCormack (eds.). Yearbook of International Humanitarian Law – 2010: 13. Springer. pp. 462 f. ISBN 978-90-6704-810-1.
- International Commission of Jurists (1972). The Events in East Pakistan, 1971: A Legal Study. Secretariat of the International Commission of Jurists Geneva. OCLC 842410.
- Islam, M. Rafiqul (2019). National Trials of International Crimes in Bangladesh: Transitional Justice as Reflected in Judgments. BRILL. ISBN 978-90-04-38938-0.
- Jahan, Rounaq (2004). "The Bangladesh Genocide". In Samuel Totten (ed.). Teaching About Genocide: Issues, Approaches, and Resources. Information Age. ISBN 978-1-59311-074-1.
- Jahan, Rounaq (2008). "Genocide in Bangladesh". In Samuel Totten; William S. Parsons (eds.). Century of Genocide: Critical Essays and Eyewitness Accounts (3rd ed.). Routledge. ISBN 978-0-415-99084-4.
- Jones, Adam (2010). Genocide: A Comprehensive Introduction. Taylor & Francis. ISBN 978-0-415-48618-7.
- Jones, Owen Bennett (2003). Pakistan: Eye of the Storm (2nd revised ed.). Yale University Press. ISBN 978-0-300-10147-8.
- Kabia, John M. (2008). Humanitarian Intervention and Conflict Resolution in West Africa: From ECOMOG to ECOMIL. Ashgate. ISBN 978-0-7546-7444-3.
- "Kamaruzzaman: The Charges". BD News 24. 9 May 2013.
- Khondker, Habibul Haque (2006). "US imperialism and Bengali nationalism". In Hadiz, Vedi R. (ed.). Empire And Neoliberalism in Asia. Routledge. ISBN 978-0-415-39080-4.
- Lee, Steven P. (2011). Ethics and War: An Introduction. Cambridge University Press. ISBN 978-0-521-72757-0.
- Linton, Suzannah (2010). "Completing the Circle: Accountability for the Crimes of the 1971 Bangladesh War of Liberation". Criminal Law Forum. 21 (2): 191–311. doi:10.1007/s10609-010-9119-8. hdl:10722/124770. S2CID 143939929.
- Malik, Anas (2010). Political Survival in Pakistan: Beyond Ideology. Routledge. ISBN 978-0-415-77924-1.
- Martin-Lucas, Belen (2010). "Mum is the Word". In Sorcha Gunne; Zoë Brigley (eds.). Feminism, Literature and Rape Narratives: Violence and Violation. Routledge. ISBN 978-0-415-80608-4.
- Midlarsky, Manus I. (2011). Origins of Political Extremism: Mass Violence in the Twentieth Century and Beyond. Cambridge University Press. ISBN 978-0-521-87708-4.
- Minegar, Benjamin (21 January 2013). "Bangladesh war crimes tribunal sentences Jamaat-e-Islami member to death". Jurist.
- Mookherjee, Nayanika (2006). "Muktir Gaan, the raped woman and migrant identities of the Bangladesh war". In Navnita Chadha Behera (ed.). Gender, Conflict and Migration. Sage. ISBN 978-0-7619-3455-4.
- Mookherjee, Nayanika (2007). "Available Motherhood: Legal technologies, 'state of exception' and the dekinning of 'war-babies' in Bangladesh". Childhood. 14 (339): 339–355. doi:10.1177/0907568207079213. S2CID 144568760.
- Mookherjee, Nayanika (2009). "Denunciatory Practices and the Constitutive Role of Collaboration in the Bangladesh War". In Sharika Thiranagama; Tobias Kelly (eds.). Traitors: Suspicion, Intimacy, and the Ethics of State-Building. University of Pennsylvania Press. ISBN 978-0-8122-4213-3.
- Mohaiemen, Naeem (2011). "Flying Blind: Waiting for a Real Reckoning on 1971". Economic & Political Weekly. XLVI (36): 40–52.
- Mohsin, Amena (2005). "Gendered nation, gendered peace: A study of Bangladesh". In Samir Kumar Das (ed.). Peace Processes and Peace Accords. Sage. ISBN 978-0-7619-3391-5.
- Molla, Gyasuddin (2004). "The Awami League: From Charismatic Leadership to Political Party". In Mike Enskat; Subrata K. Mitra, Clemens Spiess (eds.). Political Parties in South Asia. Praeger. ISBN 978-0-275-96832-8.
- Mookherjee, Nayanika (2009a). "Denunciatory practices and the constitutive role of collaboration in the Bangladesh War". In Sharika Thiranagama; Tobias Kelly (eds.). Traitors: Suspicion, Intimacy, and the Ethics of State-Building. University of Pennsylvania Press. ISBN 978-0-8122-4213-3.
- Mookherjee, Nayanika (2009b). "Friendships and Encounters on the Political Left in Bangladesh". In Heidi Armbruster; Anna Laerke (eds.). Taking Sides: Ethics, Politics, and Fieldwork in Anthropology. Berghahn. ISBN 978-1-84545-701-3.
- Mookherjee, Nayanika (2012). "Mass rape and the inscription of gendered and racial domination during the Bangladesh War of 1971". In Raphaelle Branche; Fabrice Virgili (eds.). Rape in Wartime. Palgrave Macmillan. ISBN 978-0-230-36399-1.
- Mookherjee, Nayanika (2 November 2021). "Historicising the Birangona : Interrogating the Politics of Commemorating the Wartime Rape of 1971 in the Context of the 50 th Anniversary of Bangladesh". Strategic Analysis. 45 (6): 588–597. doi:10.1080/09700161.2021.2009663. ISSN 0970-0161. S2CID 246760529.
- Murphy, Eamon (2012). The Making of Terrorism in Pakistan: Historical and social roots of extremism. Routledge. ISBN 978-0-415-56526-4.
- Mustafa, Sabir (21 January 2013). "Bangladesh's watershed war crimes moment". BBC News.
- Narine, Shaun (2009). "International Human Rights". In Joseph Masciulli; Mikhail A. Molchanov; W. Andy Knight (eds.). The Ashgate Research Companion to Political Leadership. Ashgate. pp. 335–357. ISBN 978-0-7546-7182-4.
- Newberg, Paula R. (2002). Judging the State: Courts and Constitutional Politics in Pakistan. Cambridge University Press. ISBN 978-0-521-89440-1.
- Payaslian, Simon (2012). "20th Century Genocides". Oxford Bibliographies. doi:10.1093/OBO/9780199743292-0105. ISBN 9780199743292. "A consensus has formed among scholars that genocides in the 20th century encompassed (although were not limited to) the following cases: Herero in 1904–1907, the Armenian genocide in the Ottoman Empire in 1915–1923, the Holodomor in the former Soviet Ukraine in 1932–1933, the Jewish Holocaust in 1938–1945, Bangladesh in 1971, Cambodia in 1975–1979, East Timor in 1975–1999, Bosnia in 1991–1995, and Rwanda in 1994."
- Rahman, Hamoodur (2007). Hamoodur Rahman Commission of Inquiry into the 1971 India-Pakistan War, Supplementary Report. Arc Manor. ISBN 978-1-60450-020-2.
- Rahman, Syedur; Baxter, Craig (2002). Historical Dictionary of Bangladesh. Scarecrow. ISBN 978-81-7094-588-8.
- Riedel, Bruce O. (2011). Deadly Embrace: Pakistan, America, and the Future of the Global Jihad. Brookings Institution. ISBN 978-0-8157-0557-4.
- Roy, Nilanjana S. (24 August 2010). "Bangladesh War's Toll on Women Still Undiscussed". The New York Times.
- Roy, Rituparna (2010b). South Asian Partition Fiction in English: From Khushwant Singh to Amitav Ghosh (1st ed.). Amsterdam University Press. ISBN 978-90-8964-245-5.
- Roy, Srila (2010c). "Wounds and Cures in South Asian Gender and Memory Politics". In Hannah Bradby; Gillian Lewando Hundt (eds.). Global Perspectives on War, Gender and Health. Ashgate. ISBN 978-0-7546-7523-5.
- Rummel, R.J. (1997). Death by Government: Genocide and Mass Murder Since 1900. Transaction. ISBN 978-1-56000-927-6.
- Sadique, Mahfuz (15 July 2013). "Bangladesh Islamist Ghulam Azam found guilty of war crimes". BBC News.
- Sahgal, Gita (18 December 2011). "Dead Reckoning: Disappearing stories and evidence". The Daily Star.
- Shafqat, Sahar (2007). "Pakistan (1971)". In DeRouen, Karl Jr.; Heo, Uk (eds.). Civil Wars of the World: Major Conflicts since World War II. Vol. II. ABC-CLIO. pp. 584–599. ISBN 978-1-85109-919-1.
- Saikia, Yasmin (2011a). Women, War, and the Making of Bangladesh: Remembering 1971. Duke University Press. ISBN 978-0-8223-5038-5.
- Saikia, Yasmin (2011b). "War as history, humanity in violence: Women, men and memories of 1971, East Pakistan/Bangladesh". In Elizabeth D. Heineman (ed.). Sexual Violence in Conflict Zones: From the Ancient World to the Era of Human Rights. University of Pennsylvania Press. pp. 152–170. ISBN 978-0-8122-4318-5.
- Sajjad, Tazreena (2012) [First published 2009]. "The Post-Genocidal Period and its Impact on Women". In Samuel Totten (ed.). Plight and Fate of Women During and Following Genocide. Transaction Publishers. pp. 219–248. ISBN 978-1-4128-4759-9.
- Schmid, Alex, ed. (2011). The Routledge Handbook of Terrorism Research. Routledge. ISBN 978-0-415-41157-8.
- Scholz, Sally J. (2006). "War rape's challenge to just war theory". In Steven Lee (ed.). Intervention, Terrorism, and Torture: Contemporary Challenges to Just War Theory. Springer. ISBN 978-1-4020-4677-3.
- Scholz, Sally J. (2011). "Genocide". In Deen K. Chatterjee (ed.). Encyclopedia of Global Justice. Springer. ISBN 978-1-4020-9159-9.
- Sharlach, Lisa (2000). "Rape as Genocide: Bangladesh, the Former Yugoslavia, and Rwanda". New Political Science. 22 (1): 89–102. doi:10.1080/713687893. S2CID 144966485.
- Shehabuddin, Elora (2010). "Bangladeshi civil society and Islamist politics". In Riaz, Ali; Fair, C. Christine (eds.). Political Islam and Governance in Bangladesh. Routledge. ISBN 978-0-415-57673-4.
- Siddiqi, Dina M. (1998). "Taslima Nasreen and Others: The Contest over Gender in Bangladesh". In Herbert L. Bodman; Nayereh Esfahlani Tohidi (eds.). Women in Muslim Societies: Diversity Within Unity. Lynne Rienner. ISBN 978-1-55587-578-7.
- Siddiqi, Dina M. (2008). Bonnie G. Smith (ed.). Oxford Encyclopedia of Women in World History. Vol. 1. Oxford University Press. pp. 201 f. ISBN 978-0-19-514890-9.
- Simms, Brendan (2011). "Towards a history of humanitarian intervention". In Brendan Simms; D. J. B. Trim (eds.). Humanitarian Intervention: A History. Cambridge University Press. ISBN 978-0-521-19027-5.
- Sisson, Richard; Rose, Leo E. (1992). War and Secession: Pakistan, India, and the Creation of Bangladesh. University of California Press. ISBN 978-0-520-07665-5.
- Smith, Karen E. (2010). Genocide and the Europeans. Cambridge University Press. ISBN 978-0-521-13329-6.
- Southwick, Katherine (2011). "The Urdu-speakers of Bangladesh: an unfinished story of enforcing citizenship rights". In Brad K. Blitz; Maureen Jessica Lynch (eds.). Statelessness and Citizenship: A Comparative Study on the Benefits of Nationality. Edward Elgar Publishing. pp. 115–141. ISBN 978-1-78195-215-3.
- Thomas, Dorothy Q.; Ralph, Regan E. (1994). "Rape in War: Challenging the Tradition of Impunity". SAIS Review. 14 (1): 82–99. doi:10.1353/sais.1994.0019. S2CID 154604295.
- Thomas, Dorothy Q.; Ralph, Reagan E. (1998). "Rape in War: The case of Bosnia". In Sabrina P. Ramet (ed.). Gender Politics in the Western Balkans: Women and Society in Yugoslavia and the Yugoslav Successor States. Pennsylvania State University. ISBN 978-0-271-01802-7.
- Thompson, Hanne-Ruth (2007). "Bangladesh". In Andrew Simpson (ed.). Language and National Identity in Asia. Oxford University Press. ISBN 978-0-19-926748-4.
- Tomsen, Peter (2011). The Wars of Afghanistan: Messianic Terrorism, Tribal Conflicts, and the Failures of Great Powers. Public Affairs. ISBN 978-1-58648-763-8.
- Totten, Samuel; Bartrop, Paul Robert; Jacobs, Steven L. (1998). Dictionary of Genocide: A-L. Vol. 1. Greenwood. ISBN 978-0-313-32967-8.
- Tripathi, Salil (2016). The Colonel Who Would Not Repent: The Bangladesh War and Its Unquiet Legacy. Yale University Press. ISBN 978-0-300-21818-3.
- Tulloch, John; Blood, Richard Warwick (2010). "Iconic photojournalism and absent images: Democratization and memories of terror". In Stuart Allan (ed.). The Routledge Companion to News and Journalism. Routledge. pp. 507–519. ISBN 978-0-415-66953-5.
- Tulloch, John; Blood, Richard Warwick (2012). Icons of War and Terror: Media Images in an Age of International Risk. Routledge. ISBN 978-0-415-69804-7.
- Weiss, Thomas George (2005). Military-Civilian Interactions: Humanitarian Crises and the Responsibility to Protect. Rowman & Littlefield. ISBN 978-0-8476-8746-6.
- Wheeler, Nicholas J. (2000). Saving Strangers: Humanitarian Intervention in International Society. Oxford University Press. ISBN 978-0-19-829621-8.
- Wynbrandt, James (2009). A Brief History of Pakistan (1st ed.). Facts on File. ISBN 978-0-8160-6184-6.
