= Lakhai Upazila =

Lakhai লাখাই
- Upazila
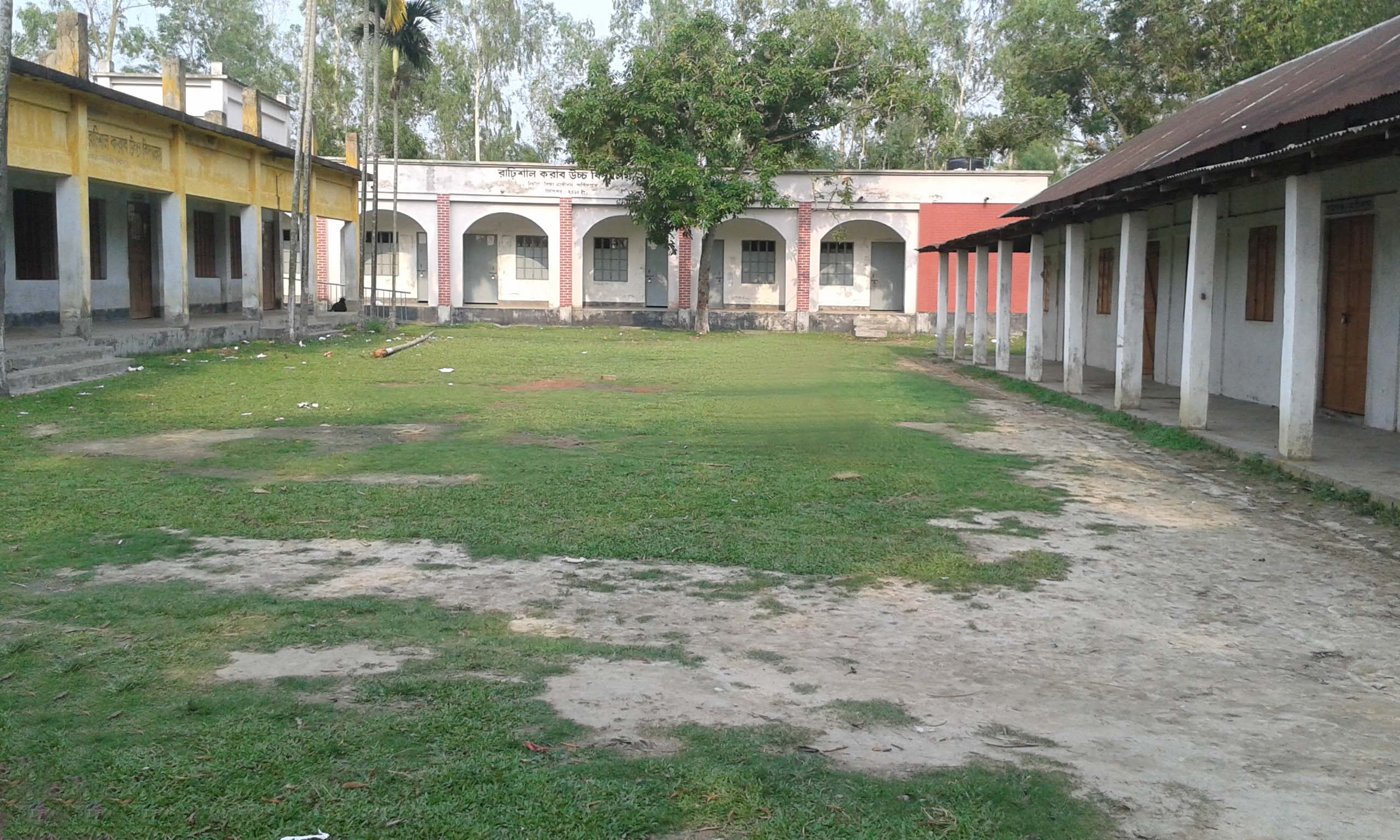
- Rarishal Karab High School

- Coordinates: 24°17.3′N 91°13′E
- Country: Bangladesh
- Division: Sylhet
- District: Habiganj

Government
  - Upazila Chairman: Mushfiqul Alam Azad Korabi

Area
  - Total: 196.54 km^{2} (75.88 sq mi)

Population (2022)
  - Total: 158,717
  - Density: 807.56/km^{2} (2,091.6/sq mi)
- Time zone: UTC+6 (BST)
- Postal code: 3341
- Website: lakhai.habiganj.gov.bd

Lakhai Upazila mauza geocode map

Lakhai (Bengali: লাখাই), is an upazila of Habiganj District in the Division of Sylhet, Bangladesh.

== History ==
Following the 1303 Conquest of Sylhet, Bayazid Shah, a companion of Shah Jalal, took refuge in Bulla and propagated Islam there. Bayazid remains buried in a mazar (mausoleum) in Bulla bazaar.

Lakhai was previously under the sub-registry of Charabhanga in modern-day Madhabpur Upazila. On 10 January 1922, the Lakhai thana was established as per Assam Province's gazette notification 176GK.

During the Bangladesh Liberation War of 1971, a massacre was conducted in the village of Krishnapur on 18 September. The Pakistani Army also attacked the villages of Murakari and Bhabanipur. In the village of Madna, the army set fire to the house of Dewan Ali. On 29 October, the Pakistani forces took shelter in the houses of some brokers at night in Muriyauk. Early in the morning, they wanted to go to the house of Shahjahan Chishti, a freedom fighter in Muriyauk. Unable to find Chishti at his house, the forces captured his sixty-year-old father, Abdul Jabbar, and set the house on fire. In the same village, the forces also captured 65-year old Idris Ali, father of Bengali freedom fighter Ilias Kamal. They then proceeded to kidnap the two old men to Lakhai Union. According to some sources, the next day the forces took a speed boat to Bhairab and the old men were shot dead on the way and were never found.

In 1983, Lakhai was promoted to a designated police station through the efforts of many people. On 15 April 1983, the foundation was laid for a police station at Kalauk in Bhadikara Mouza, Bamai Union. In 1984, there was a circle officer development outpost in modern-day Swajangram in Lakhai Union.

== Geography ==
Lakhai is located at 24.2889°N 91.2167°E. It has 27,759 households and total area of 196.54 km^{2}. Lakhai is the connecting point of 3 administrative divisions Sylhet, Dhaka & Chittagong of Bangladesh. It is surrounded by Habiganj Sadar Upazila, Baniachang Upazila, Madhabpur Upazila of Habiganj, Nasirnagar Upazila of Brahmanbaria and Austagram Upazila of Kishoreganj where Lakhai Upazila is the centre Point. Main rivers are: Meghna, Sutang, Monikhai, Balabhadra rivers

== Demographics ==
Historical population
Year	Pop. (000)	±%
1981	93	—
1991	110	+18.3%
2001	121	+10.0%
2011	149	+23.1%
2022	159	+6.7%
Source: Bangladesh Bureau of Statistics

Religions in Lakhai Upazila (2022)
Religion	Percent
Islam	86.03%
Hinduism	13.96%
Other or not stated	0.01%

According to the 2022 Bangladeshi census, Lakhai Upazila had 32,940 households and a population of 158,717. 12.88% of the population were under 5 years of age. Lakhai had a literacy rate (age 7 and over) of 63.95%: 63.53% for males and 64.29% for females, and a sex ratio of 85.55 males for every 100 females. 39,889 (25.13%) lived in urban areas.

According to the 2011 Census of Bangladesh, Lakhai Upazila had 27,759 households and a population of 148,811. 49,273 (33.11%) were under 10 years of age. Lakhai had a literacy rate (age 7 and over) of 33.73%, compared to the national average of 51.8%, and a sex ratio of 1104 females per 1000 males. 17,235 (11.58%) lived in urban areas.

== Economy ==
Lakhai consists of both plain lands and haor areas, not only self-sufficient in food and fish but also exports, is famous for paddy, jute and winter corps.

== Points of interest ==
Kalauk, Bhadikara, Bamai, Katihara, Lakhai, Amanullahpur (Borbari) Morakori, Muriauk, Karab, Bulla, Madna, Sinhagram, Begunai, Teghoria, Shibpur, Krishnapur, Dharmapur, Moshadia, Fulbaria, Satauk, Sajangram, Rarishal, Marugach, Noagaon, Sontoshpur, Zirunda Manpur, Kamrapur, Montoil, Shuneswar, Moubari, Gonipoor, Kataia, Foridpur, Bali, Chondipur, Morshidpur.Nokhlak, Bamoi

== Administration ==
Lakhai Upazila is divided into six union parishads: Bamai, Bulla, Karab, Lakhai, Murakari, and Muriauk. The union parishads are subdivided into 70 mauzas and 65 villages.

== Transport ==
Lakhai is connected through Habiganj, Ashuganj, Fandauk, Chatiain by road; Bhairab by launch and Shayestaganj, Shahjibazar, Nayapara by rail communications. Regional highway runs through Sarail, Nasirnagar, Lakhai, Habiganj route is important for road communications in this region. Lakhai–Dhaka and Lakhai–Sylhet direct bus services are available.

Lakhai was river based upazila in the past. But nowadays it has developed immediately.

== Education and culture ==
At the 2001 census the average literacy rate of Lakhai Upazila was 28.7% (7+ years), where national average is 46.2%.

Lakhai is known for pithas and hospitality, featuring cultural influences from greater Sylhet, Dhaka, and Chittagong, as well as foreign connections.

There is a non-governmental orphanage in Battala called Nurul Huda Orphanage. Notable eidgahs are Mashadiya and Kataiya Eidgah and well-known mosques are Teghoriya Mosque, Singhgram Masjid and Bhadikara Mosque.

Educational institutes include

- Karab Nuria Islamia Madrasah.
- Hazrat Aisha Siddika (R.) Women's Madrasah, Karab.
- Fulbaria Mujibia Islamia Hafizia Madrasa
- Lakhai Muktijoddha Degree College
- Kalauk High School, (Upazila Sadar)
- Zirunda Manpur Tofailia Senior Madrasa
- Muriauk High School
- Dharmapur Baage Modina Gausia Dakhil Madrasa
- Bamai Model High School (founded 1961)
- Rarhishal Korab High School
- Amanullahpur Shafikia Hafizia Madrasah, (Borbari)
- Lakhai Darul Hoda Madrasah & Yeateem Khana
- Bhabanipur High School
- Kataia Darussalam Islamia Madrasa
- Katihara Hafizia Madrasah
- Teghoria Darul Ulom Madrasah
- Morakori High School (founded 1962)
- Bulla Singhgram Girls High School
- Teghoria SEDF Model High School
- Krishnapur High School
- Korab Rahmania Dakhil Madrasa
- Fulbaria Ebtedaee Madrasa

== Notable residents ==
- Mostafa Ali, former parliamentarian
- Mukhlesur Rahman Chowdhury, journalist, editor, and adviser in the caretaker government of President Iajuddin Ahmed, attended Lakhai A.C.R.C. Pilot High School.

== See also ==
- Upazilas of Bangladesh
- Districts of Bangladesh
- Divisions of Bangladesh
