= Mostafa Ali =

Bangladeshi politician (1921–1975)

Advocate Mostafa Ali

Governor of Habiganj Subdivision
- In office 17 July 1975 – 26 July 1975
- President: Sheikh Mujibur Rahman

Member of 1st Jatiya Sangsad
- In office 7 March 1973 – 6 November 1976
- Succeeded by: Junab Ali
- Constituency: Sylhet-19

Member of the Constituent Assembly of Bangladesh
- In office 1971 – 6 November 1973

Personal details
- Born: 1921 Lakhai, Habiganj, Sylhet district
- Died: 26 June 1975 (aged 53–54) Bangladesh
- Party: Awami League
- Other political affiliations: BAKSAL
- Education: St. Xavier's College; University of Calcutta

Mostafa Ali (Bengali: মোস্তফা আলী; 1921–26 July 1975) was a Bangladeshi politician and advocate. He was a member of parliament for Sylhet-19 as an Awami League representative.

== Early life and education ==
Ali was born in 1921, to a Bengali Muslim family in the village of Muriauk in Lakhai, Habiganj (then under Sylhet district) in the Assam Province of the British Raj. He passed his matriculation from Habiganj Government High School in 1937, and enrolled at the St. Xavier's College in Calcutta from where he earned his Bachelor of Arts in 1942. He also graduated with a Bachelor of Law from the University of Calcutta in 1941.

== Career ==
Ali began his career as a lawyer, and later became the president of the Habiganj Bar Association.He joined the All Pakistan Awami Muslim League in 1952 and participated in the Bengali language movement. In 1954, Ali became the secretary of the Awami League's Habiganj subdivisional branch and was elected as its president in 1958. He represented the Awami League in the 1970 Pakistani general election and was successfully elected to the NE-120 (Sylhet-I) constituency. However, the assembly was not formed and later led to the Bangladesh Liberation War. During the war, Ali served as the convener of the Habiganj Subdivision Sangram Council and was a member of the Constituent Assembly of Bangladesh. In Mujibnagar, he served as sub-regional administrator for the Provisional Government of Bangladesh.

During the first set of elections in the newly-established country, Ali preserved his seat in the Jatiya Sangsad as a Bangladesh Awami League candidate from Sylhet-19. On 17 July 1975, he was appointed as the Governor of Habiganj Subdivision under the BAKSAL regime. He was also the chairman of the Habiganj Red Cross and served as the chairman of Habiganj Central Co-operative Bank from 1970 to 1972.

Ali was elected to parliament from Sylhet-19 as an Awami League candidate in 1973.

== Death ==
Ali died on 26 July 1975 in Bangladesh.
