= Muktijuddho e-Archive =

Bangladeshi archive organization

- মুক্তিযুদ্ধ ই-আর্কাইভ
- Founded: 2007
- Type: Non-profit (Library, Archive & Research)
- Location: Dhaka, Bangladesh
- Key people: Sabbir Hossain & Shanta Anower
- Employees: 12
- Website: liberationwarbangladesh.org

Muktijuddho e-Archive (Bengali: মুক্তিযুদ্ধ ই-আর্কাইভ), also known as Bangladesh Liberation War e-Archive, is a 'Library, Archive & Research' organization, founded in 2007, working with collection, preservation & distribution of historical documents & research on the Liberation War of Bangladesh and Genocide of Innocent Bengali People in 1971. It was previously known as 'Bangladesh Liberation War Library & Research Centre', later in March 2016, it was registered under existing Trust Law of Bangladesh as 'Muktijuddho e-Archive Trust'. On 14 November 2016, it was officially inaugurated.

Bangladesh earned her freedom from Pakistan through a bloody war in 1971 after more than two decades of ethnic oppression & humiliation. More than three million Bengalis were killed and half a million Bengali women were raped by Pakistan Military Forces, Biharis, Jamat-I-Islami, Islami Chatra Shangha (Now Islam-I-Chatra Shibir), Muslim League, Nezam-I-Islami Party, Razakars, Al-Shams, Al-Badr, Shanti Committee, Muzahid Bahini during the nine months long Liberation War of Bangladesh in 1971.

== Projects ==
=== Liberation War e-Archive ===
Liberation War e-Archive (Muktijuddho e-Archive) is a digital library & archive, started on 4 May 2014, working to 'preserve and publicly distribute' the historical documents in digitized format, such as- ebooks, documents, documentaries, movies, video footage & audios, regarding the Liberation War of Bangladesh and Genocide of Innocent Bengali People in 1971. This is the largest digital library on this subject. All contents are public & free for all readers and researchers. The Exeter South Asia Centre of the College of Humanities of the University of Exeter listed ‘Muktijuddho e-Archive’ as a source for Research materials.

=== Liberation War Academy ===
"Liberation War Academy" is a mass education program on liberation war & 1971 genocide of Bangladesh. It has two photographic museum on the topic in Chittagong & Narayanganj.

=== Research and publications ===
This wing of the organisation is related with research & publication.

== Photo archive ==
Muktijuddho e-Archive has released some 5,000 photos of the liberation war & genocide of Bangladesh taken by photographers from local & across the world. The photos testify to the genocide and atrocities carried out by the then Pakistani occupation forces, plights of the refugees, training and operations of the freedom fighters, and the celebration on victory. The archive also has a bulk collection of photos of Bangabandhu and the erstwhile political movements. Mostly in black and white format, the photos were collected from personal albums and the stock photography archives.

== Awards ==
On 3 January 2015, Muktijuddho e-Archive was honoured by Bangladesh Student League in an official celebration of 67th foundation day of the organisation.
