= Junab Ali =

Bangladeshi politician

Member of parliament from Sylhet-19 seat.
- In office 18 February 1979 – 12 February 1982
- Preceded by: Mostafa Ali
- Succeeded by: defunct seat

Personal details
- Born: Mohammad Junab Ali; 1 May 1937 Habiganj
- Died: 15 May 1985 (aged 48) Habiganj
- Party: Bangladesh Nationalist Party
- Education: Brindaban Government College

Junab Ali (1 May 1937 – 15 May 1985) was a politician of Bangladesh Nationalist Party. He was elected member of parliament from ex Sylhet-19 seat.

== Early life ==
Junab Ali was born on 1 May 1937 in Dakshin Jatrapasha mahalla of Baniachang in Habiganj subdivision of Sylhet district in Assam, then British India. In 1953, he passed matriculation from LR High School in Baniachang. He passed IA from Brindaban College, Habiganj in 1955 and BA from the same college in 1957. After that he passed LLB from Dhaka Central Law College.

== Political life ==
Junab elected member of parliament in second Bangladesh parliamentary election of 1979 as a candidate of Bangladesh Nationalist Party from ex Sylhet-19 seat.

== Death ==
Junab Ali died on 15 May 1985.
