= Short-arm inspection =

Euphemism for a medical inspection

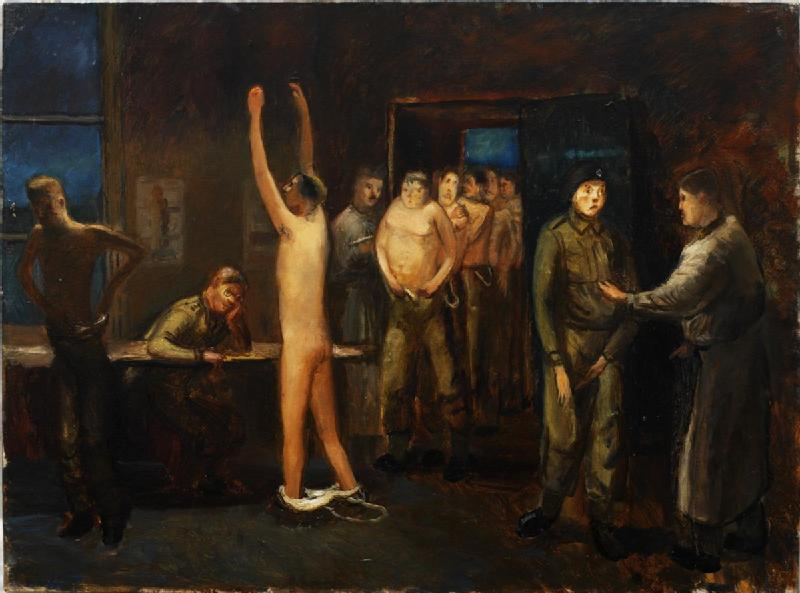
Painting by Carel Weight of British Army recruits undergoing medical inspection, 1942 (Imperial War Museum art collection)

The term "short-arm inspection" is a military euphemism referring to the routine medical inspection of male soldiers' penises ("short arms") for signs of sexually-transmitted diseases and other medical problems.

The precise origin of the term is uncertain; however, American and Australian troops are known to have used the term during the First World War.

== Examples ==
The practice within the Imperial Japanese Army during World War II was described by an anonymous American soldier, who had been forced to work as a truck driver while held as a prisoner of war, and who came into daily close contact with Japanese soldiers.

When a Jap G.I. turns in with a venereal disease, he gets a good beating and loses what few privileges have been allowed to him. For this reason, they go to civilian doctors or to drug stores, and try to doctor themselves. Many of them are infected. Short-arm inspection is held only on rare occasions. In fact, there was only one such inspection during the time I was a prisoner.

— American, former prisoner of war (1945)

== In literature ==
The practice of short-arm inspection was described in Earle Birney's novel Turvey, a comic account of Canadian soldiers during World War II.

After the ordained blanket line-ups and personnel quickies, the new arrivals were given a short-arm inspection. Although this was already Turvey's fourth since enlistment, it was the first since hospitalization and he awaited his turn with some apprehension. The twenty silent soldiers were paraded by a silent corporal into a small room smelling of lysol. They shuffled in a single line past the RAP [Regimental Aid Post] Sergeant ... The sergeant had the reputation of being the fastest and merriest short-arm inspector in the Canadian Army.
