= Comilla Cantonment massacre =

1971 massacre in East Pakistan

The Comilla Cantonment massacre (Bengali: কুমিল্লা সেনানিবাস হত্যাকাণ্ড) was carried out by the Pakistan Army in East Pakistan (present-day Bangladesh) in March 1971. Lt. Colonel Mansoorul Huq claimed that 17 Bengali army officers and 953 soldiers were executed in Comilla Cantonment on the night of 27–28 March 1971. His claim was considered "concrete" by the Hamoodur Rahman commission. According to other sources, the victims were 17 Bengali officers and 915 men (all Muslims), killed during their disarming on the orders of Lt. Gen. Yakub Malik.
