= War Crimes Fact Finding Committee =

Bangladeshl committee

The War Crimes Fact Finding Committee was a group set up in Bangladesh to investigate the Human rights abuses carried out during the Bangladesh Liberation War.

The organisation investigates war crimes and pressures the government of Bangladesh to prosecute war criminals.
