= Trial of Sheikh Hasina =

2025 war crimes case in Bangladesh

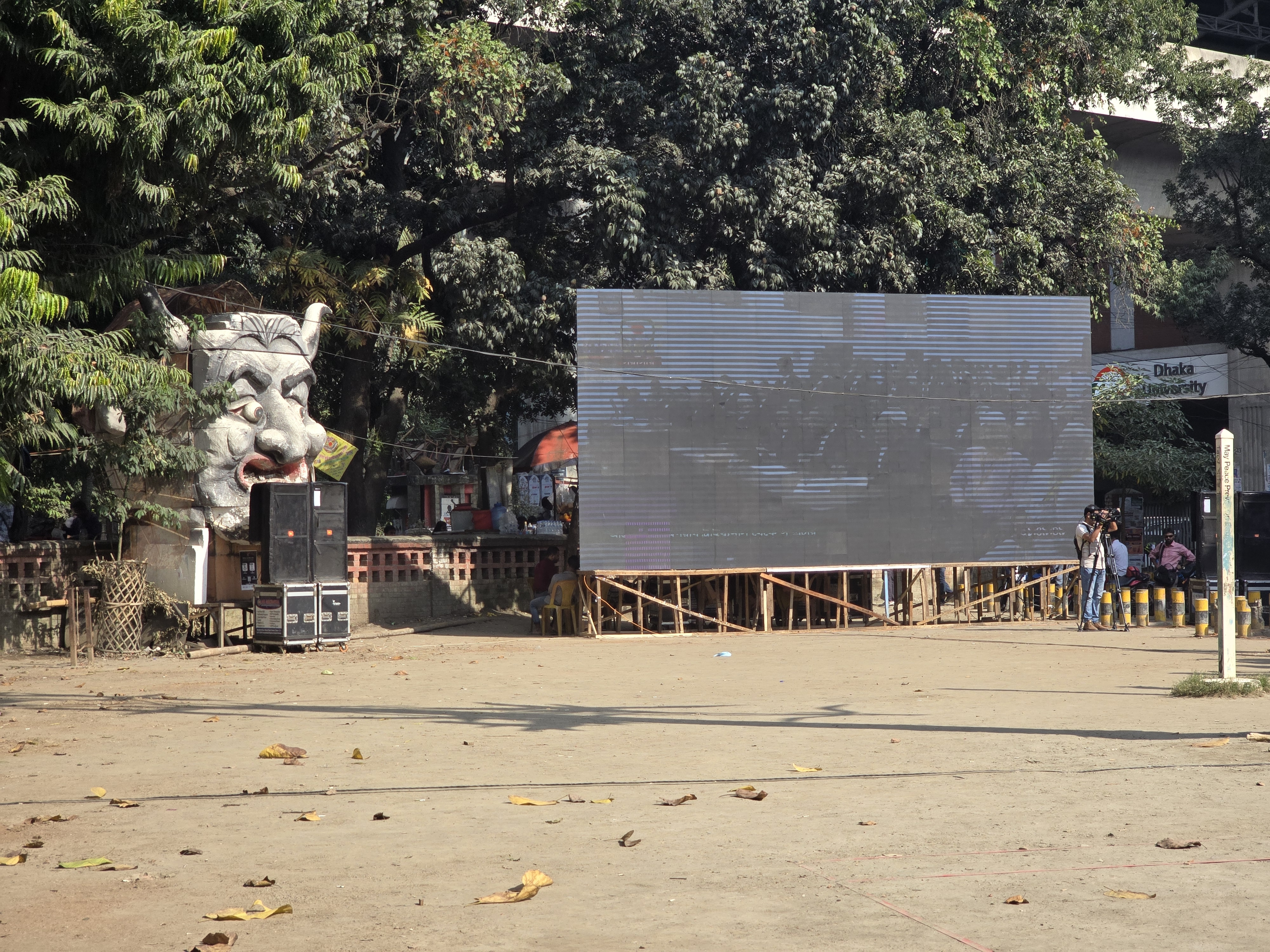
- Verdict of the trial being telecast live at the Teacher-Student Centre, University of Dhaka.
- Court: International Crimes Tribunal-1 (Bangladesh)
- Full case name: Chief Prosecutor vs. Sheikh Hasina & Others
- Submitted: 1 June 2025
- Decided: 17 November 2025
- Verdict: Sheikh Hasina, Asaduzzaman Khan Kamal and Chowdhury Abdullah Al-Mamun guilty of crimes against humanity.: Hasina and Kamal sentenced to death.; Mamun sentenced to five years in prison.
- Charge: Abetment; Incitement; Complicity; Facilitation; Conspiracy and failure to prevent mass murder
- Prosecution: Mohammad Tajul Islam (on behalf of the state)
- Defense: Md Amir Hossain (on behalf of Sheikh Hasina and Asaduzzaman Khan Kamal, in absentia): Jaiad Bin Amjad (on behalf of Chowdhury Abdullah Al-Mamun)
- Citation: ICT BD Case No. 02 of 2025
- Legislation cited: International Crimes (Tribunals) Act, 1973

Case history
- Subsequent action: Separate contempt of court conviction (2 July 2025): 6 months in prison.

Court membership
- Chairman: Golam Mortuza Mozumder
- Members: Mohitul Haque Md Enam Chowdhury; Md. Shofiul Alam Mahmood

The Chief Prosecutor vs. Sheikh Hasina & Others was a case before the International Crimes Tribunal-I, Bangladesh, charging former Prime Minister Sheikh Hasina, former Home Minister Asaduzzaman Khan Kamal, and former Inspector General of Bangladesh Police Chowdhury Abdullah Al-Mamun with crimes against humanity related to the government's violent suppression of protests in July and August 2024. Hasina and Kamal, who were tried in absentia, were convicted on 17 November 2025 and sentenced to death. Mamun, who had been in police custody since September 2024, was also found guilty but received a five-year prison term after cooperating with investigators and serving as a state witness.

The charges were formally submitted in June 2025 by the prosecution, led by Mohammad Tajul Islam, while court-appointed attorney Amir Hossain represented the defendants tried in absentia. The proceedings were adjudicated by a three-judge panel of the tribunal. The charges stemmed from the state's response to the 2024 protests, which international observers and human rights organisations described as among the deadliest civilian crackdowns in Bangladesh since independence.

== Background ==
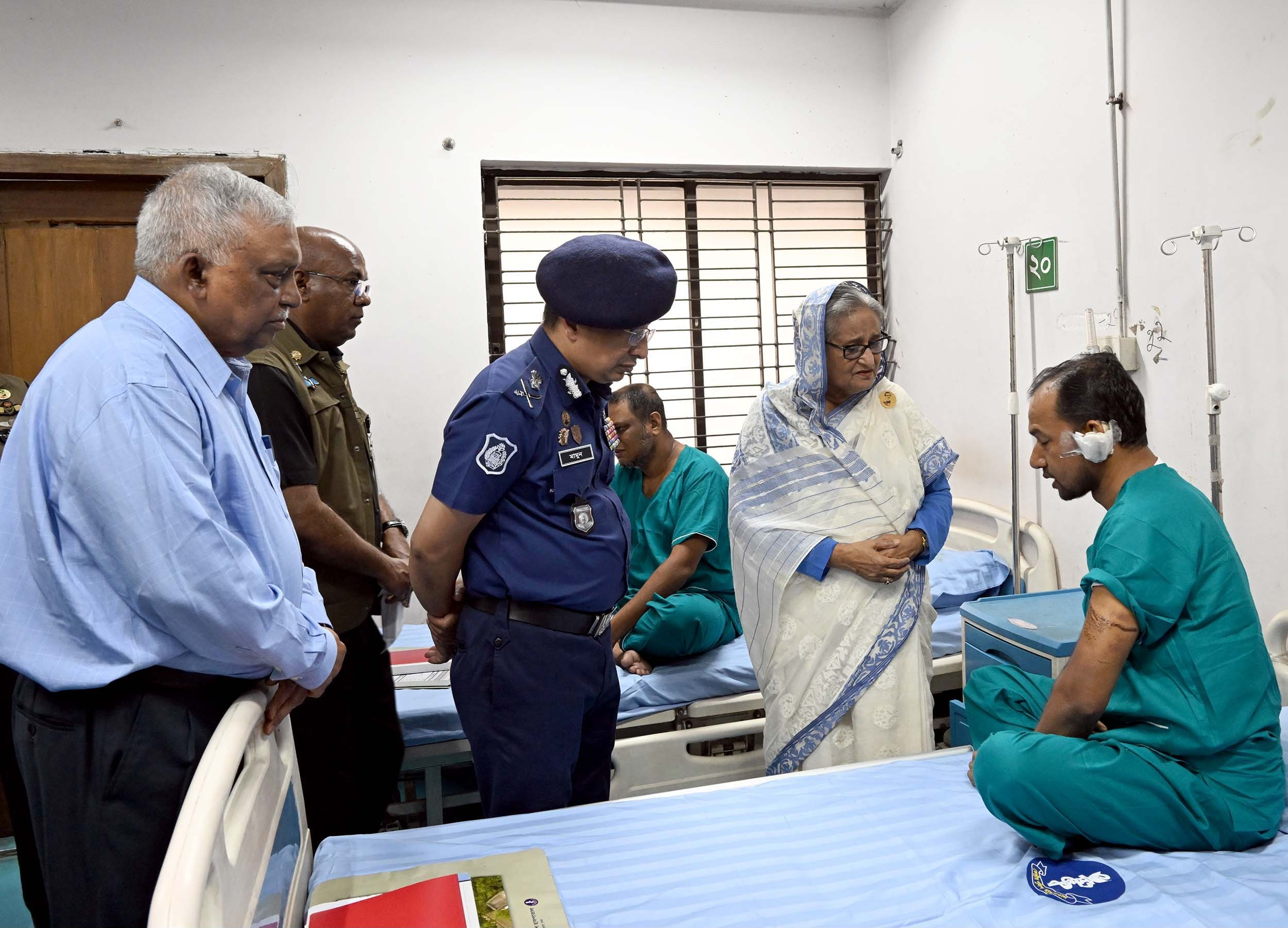
Sheikh Hasina, Asaduzzaman Khan, and Chowdhury Abdullah Al-Mamun visiting injured police officers at Rajarbag Police Hospital on 28 July 2024, following the violent suppression of protesters of the July Revolution. All three were later named in criminal cases related to the July massacre.

In mid‑2024, mass demonstrations led by university students demanding an end to the perceived discriminatory quota in public jobs took place across Bangladesh. The protests intensified across Dhaka and other major cities, and by late July, state security forces launched a violent crackdown under directives linked to Sheikh Hasina. According to UN investigators, up to 1,400 civilians died during the crackdown, an action that the tribunal alleges Sheikh Hasina orchestrated as the "mastermind".

On 5 August 2024, Sheikh Hasina was ousted from power and fled to India, triggering formal trial preparations. An interim government led by Muhammad Yunus was formed on 8 August 2024. On 14 October 2024, the interim government reconstituted the International Crimes Tribunal–1, appointing two judges of the High Court Division—Additional Judge Golam Mortuza Mozumder as the chairman and Justice Md. Shofiul Alam Mahmood, as a member, alongside retired district judge Mohitul Haque Enam Chowdhury.

The Crimes Tribunal issued arrest warrants in early 2025 targeting Hasina and key former officials for crimes against humanity. On 1 June 2025, the prosecution formally filed charges against Hasina, naming her as the principal accused in the tribunal.

== Opening of the trial ==
The trial officially began on 1 June 2025, when the International Crimes Tribunal (ICT) accepted the prosecution's framing of the case as a matter of "coordinated and systematic violence" against unarmed civilians. The trial marked the first time a former Bangladeshi prime minister was brought before the tribunal on charges of crimes against humanity. Proceedings were televised nationwide, a first in the country's legal history. The prosecution alleged that the Hasina government deployed conventional police and military units, as well as drones, helicopters, and incendiary weapons against demonstrators.

The tribunal ruled that the trial would proceed in absentia for Sheikh Hasina and Asaduzzaman Khan Kamal, both of whom had refused to return to Bangladesh despite formal summons and public notices. On 19 June 2025, the tribunal appointed AY Moshiuzzaman, a senior jurist of the Supreme Court of Bangladesh, as amicus curiae in the case. Former IGP of Bangladesh, Chowdhury Abdullah Al-Mamun, who was taken into custody in May 2025, pleaded guilty and agreed to testify as a state witness. He defending attorney was Jaiad Bin Amjad.

=== Charges ===
On 10 July 2025, the ICT formally indicted Sheikh Hasina on five counts of crimes against humanity. The charges include orchestrating mass killings of protesters in Dhaka, the use of helicopters and drones to fire on civilian crowds, the Killing of Abu Sayed, the incineration of bodies in Ashulia to destroy evidence and the coordinated killing of demonstrators in Chankharpul. The prosecution presented surveillance footage, drone logs, hospital records, and leaked government communications as part of its preliminary evidence. The tribunal concluded that the evidence supported a finding of a state-orchestrated attack on a civilian population with the intent to intimidate, suppress dissent, and obstruct democratic mobilization. A total of 203 individuals, alongside Sheikh Hasina and several former government and police officials, have been indicted by the Tribunal, with 73 currently in custody.

=== Contempt conviction ===
Separate from the main trial, Hasina was convicted of contempt of court on 2 July 2025 following the release of an audio recording in which she was allegedly heard stating that she had a "licence to kill" due to having faced 227 legal cases in the past.

The tribunal found the statement to be a direct affront to the integrity of the court and sentenced her to six months' imprisonment in absentia. ICT maintained that the contempt conviction was procedurally independent from the war crimes charges.

== Proceedings and timeline ==
After the 10 July indictment, the tribunal scheduled opening statements for 3 August 2025, with witness testimony to begin the following day. The prosecution indicated that it would call around 84 witnesses, including medical personnel, journalists, survivors, and former security officials. The court appointed public defenders to represent the absent defendants under tribunal rules.

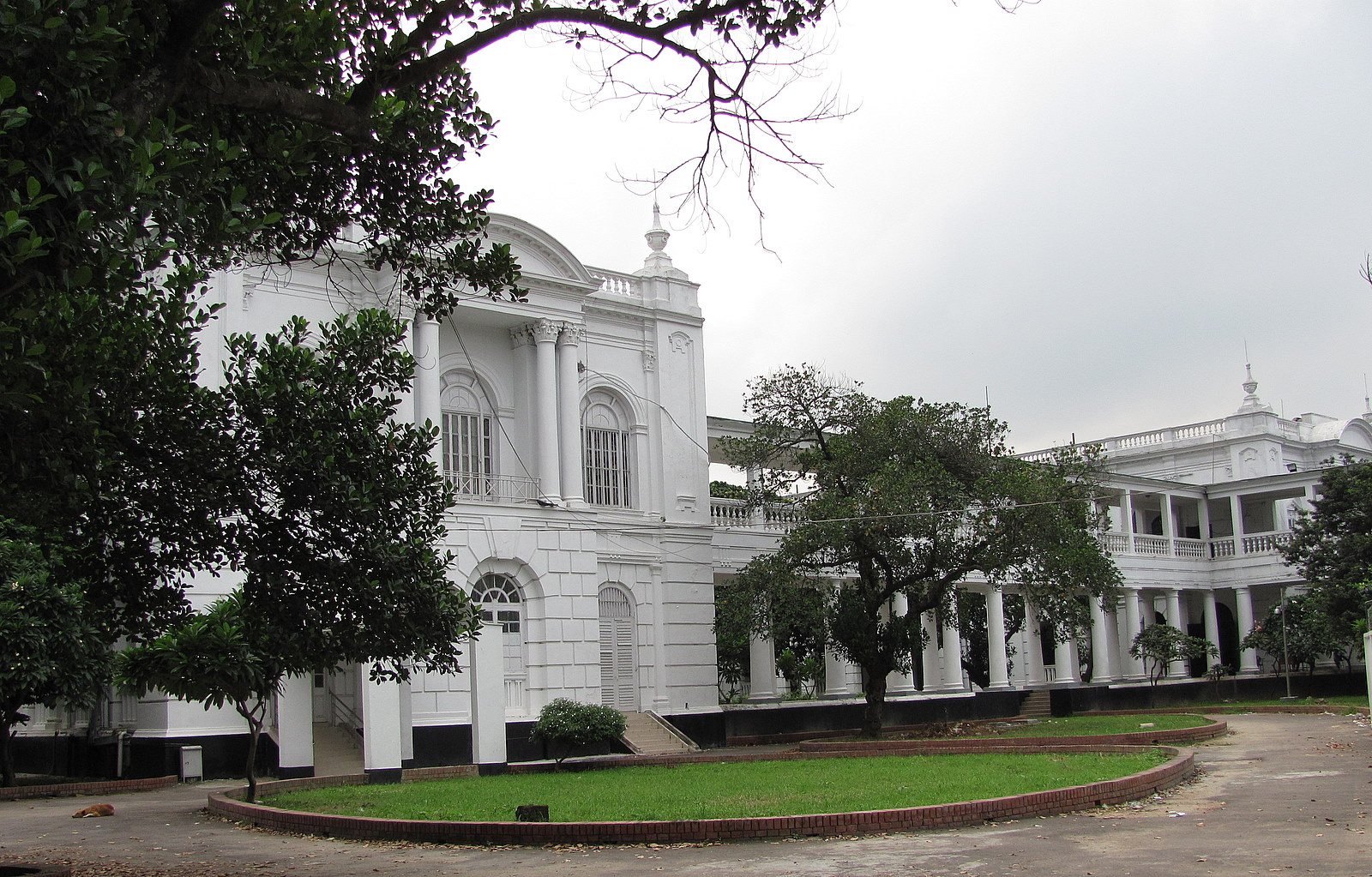
The Old High Court Building, Dhaka, where the proceedings of the Tribunal-1 took place.

On 3 August 2025, the prosecution presented its opening statement before a three‑judge panel headed by Justice Golam Mortuza Mozumder. The statement outlined five charges and referenced 11 emblematic incidents of alleged crimes, including extrajudicial killings, enforced disappearances, torture, and obstruction of justice.

On 4 August 2025, the tribunal heard the first witness testimony from Khokon Chandra Barmon, a protest survivor shot in the face in the Jatrabari crackdown. He identified senior officials as responsible, including Sheikh Hasina, and demanded maximum punishment. Another witness, Abdullah Al Imran, testified that he heard Hasina ordering hospital authorities "no release, no treatment" for injured protesters. He was denied treatment at the National Institute of Traumatology and Orthopedic Rehabilitation.

The proceedings were broadcast live on state television. The defendant Chowdhury Abdullah Al Mamun, who was in custody at the time and had pleaded guilty, was present in court and represented by counsel. Defendants Sheikh Hasina and Asaduzzaman Khan Kamal were both tried in absentia and were represented by court‑appointed attorney Amir Hossain.

=== Verdict ===
On 17 November, 2025, the ICT found her guilty on three of the five charges of preventing justice, ordering killings and failing to take measures to stop punitive killings. The verdict, as read by Justice Golam Mortuza Mozumder noted:

Accused prime minister Sheikh Hasina committed crimes against humanity by her incitement order and also failure to take preventive and punitive measures under charge 1. Accused Sheikh Hasina committed one count of crimes against humanity by her order to use drones, helicopters and lethal weapons under charge number 2.

Hasina and Kamal were sentenced to capital punishment as well as seizure of all assets belonging to them. The confiscation covers the properties declared in their affidavits submitted for the 12th National Parliament Election.

Though Mamun was found guilty, he avoided the death penalty as he turned into a state witness and sentenced to five years in prison. He also apologized to the court and the country. Hasina's conviction was premised on her having ordered the deployment of drones, helicopters and lethal weapons, as well as "by virtue of her order" the killings of 12 protesters in the areas of Chankarpul in Dhaka and Ashulia in Savar. She was further sentenced to imprisonment, until the death penalty was carried out, on three other counts. The court further ordered compensation to the families of the victims.

=== Further charges ===
Following the death sentence, on 27 November, three cases brought by the Anti-Corruption Commission (ACC) over property purchases in the Purbachal New Town project. resulted in a further 7-year sentence for each charge by Judge Mohammad Abdullah Al Mamun of Dhaka Special Judge Court-5. His judgement ruled:

[Hasina's conduct] demonstrates a persistent corruption mindset rooted in entitlement, unchecked power, and a greedy eye for public property. Treating public land as a private asset, she directed her greedy eye toward state resources and manipulated official procedures to benefit herself and her close relatives.

Her son, Sajeeb Wazed, and daughter, Saima Wazed, were also sentenced to five years in prison in one of the cases. Public Prosecutor Khan Moinul Hasan south to appeal the verdict seeking the maximum sentence.

== Reactions ==
=== Pre-verdict ===
The Awami League, now banned from electoral politics, condemned the tribunal as a "kangaroo court" and accused the interim government of weaponising the judiciary to suppress dissent. Party general secretary Obaidul Quader called the trial a "farce" designed for political vendetta by "anti-liberation" forces. Hasina's son and advisor Sajeeb Wazed Joy, predicted that his mother would be sentenced to death, but they would not appeal the verdict to the Supreme Court of Bangladesh unless an elected government took office with the Awami League as well as threatening again to disrupt the 2026 general election. He also said that she would be safe because India is providing her with security. He further threatened to block the 2026 Bangladeshi general election following their party's ban.

Former information minister Mohammad Ali Arafat dismissed the trial and against Hasina as a “scripted” and “sham” process, alleging it was controlled by the interim government of Muhammad Yunus. He further claimed that Bangladesh is under the influence of “jihadists” and accused Jamaat-e-Islami of infiltrating and capturing the administration.

International observers, including the United Nations Human Rights Office, expressed cautious support for judicial accountability while warning of serious rights concerns and urging impartiality.

British journalist David Bergman expressed concern that the Tribunal-appointed lawyer representing both Sheikh Hasina and her co-accused, Asaduzzaman Khan, poses a conflict of interest, as their legal defenses could differ significantly and each should have separate representation.

Prior to the announcement of the verdict, Hasina released an audio message in which she asserted that the allegations and charges against her were "false" and that she was still alive.

=== Post-verdict ===
==== Domestic ====
University students and the public react at TSC to the trial of Sheikh Hasina.

The verdict was broadly welcomed by most Bangladeshi political parties as well as the general public. Family members of the victims in court applauded the verdict. In preparation for the verdict, police had issued shoot-at-sight orders against violent actors. Later the army and police used batons and sound grenades against students from Dhaka College near Dhanmondi 32, who had gathered with excavators to demolish the remnants of Hasina's father's house. Demonstrators outside the International Crimes Tribunal staged a symbolic protest by broadcasting a mock "missing notice" for Hasina and her family, mimicking public announcements typically made for missing persons. Students at the University of Dhaka (DU) gathered at the Teacher–Student Centre (TSC) to watch the verdict on a large screen set up by Dhaka University Central Students' Union (DUCSU), with many celebrating and distributing sweets.

Chief Prosecutor Mohammad Tajul Islam, who led the case, reacted to the verdict by saying that "all international norms and standards" and that the "evidence presented here would stand in any court in the world." He concluded by saying: "This verdict proves that no one is above the law, no matter how powerful." Attorney General Mohammed Asaduzzaman reacted by saying: "This verdict will remain "a milestone for justice and the rule of law in Bangladesh."

Hasina criticized the interim government of Muhammed Yunus by saying Hindus were allegedly being attacked, as well as criticizing alleged judicial impartiality. She issued a statement that read: "They are biased and politically motivated. In their distasteful call for the death penalty, they reveal the brazen and murderous intent of extremist figures within the interim government to remove Bangladesh's last elected prime minister, and to nullify the Awami League as a political force." Her Awami League called for a countrywide shutdown that day.

Hasina’s spokesperson, former minister Mohammad Ali Arafat, criticized the verdict issued by the International Crimes Tribunal, stating that “the death sentence handed down by this kangaroo court is legally void.”

Bangladesh Nationalist Party (BNP) leader Salahuddin Ahmed spoke from DU and said that the punishment was "less than the gravity of the crimes" and that the "judgment proves that no matter how powerful a fascist or autocrat becomes, they will one day have to stand in the dock," while calling for other related cases to also result in such judgments." BNP youth leader and Mir Mugdho's brother, Mir Snigdho, said of the verdict against Mamun that "we will appeal...[the] five-year sentence, or at the very least, we want life imprisonment." Jamaat-e-Islami leader Mia Golam Parwar hailed the verdict as "an important day for Bangladesh." The Foreign Ministry of Bangladesh called on India to extradite Hasina. The statement read: "Providing refuge to these individuals, who have been convicted of crimes against humanity, by any other country would be a highly unfriendly act and a disregard for justice."

==== International ====
UN High Commissioner for Human Rights Volker Türk wanted Bangladesh to "move forward with a comprehensive process of truth-telling, reparation and justice as the pathway to national reconciliation and healing." He added: "The Office stands ready to support the Government and people of Bangladesh in these endeavours." Human Rights Spokeswoman Ravina Shamdasani released a press statement stating that the "Hasina verdict is an important moment for victims." She added, though, that they oppose death penalties in all circumstances.

India's Ministry of External Affairs released a statement a few hours after the verdict that read they are aware of the decision and that "as a neighbour, India remains committed to the best interests of the people of Bangladesh." It added: "We will always engage constructively with all stakeholders to that end."

NGOs

Amnesty International and Human Rights Watch expressed concerns over the fairness and speed of the trial process and absence of the convicted persona in the trial, while asserting the significance of the trial for the families of the victims. They also maintained their position against capital punishment.

== Analysis ==
According to Al Jazeera, Sheikh Hasina's extradition from India is unlikely, due to close ties with her party and strained relations with the interim government of Bangladesh. Sanjay Bharadwaj, a professor of the Jawaharlal Nehru University, said that the incumbent government of Bangladesh is viewed as "anti-India forces" by the Indian government, and Hasina's return would mean "legitimizing" them. Michael Kugelman, senior fellow with the Asia Pacific Foundation of Canada, expressed concerns of violent actions from the Awami League in reaction to the verdict ahead of 2026 general election. Sabir Mustafa, former head of BBC Bangla, considered the trial to be "seriously flawed," and that a death penalty for a case held in absentia was "unjust."

Indian pro-government news channels such as Republic Bangla, News 18, Swadesh News and Asia Net News broadcast or used a still image of a video that shows a major torchlight procession, which they claimed to be a demonstration of the post-verdict "shutdown" programme of the Awami League in Bangladesh. However, Prothom Alo found that the procession was organised by a BNP faction days before the trial over the local electoral nomination-related problems.

== See also ==
- 2025 Awami League ban protests
- Capital punishment in Bangladesh
- Operation Devil Hunt
