= Md. Shofiul Alam Mahmood =

Bangladeshi judge

Justice of the High Court Division of Bangladesh

Personal details
- Profession: Judge

Md. Shofiul Alam Mahmood is a judge of the High Court Division of Bangladesh Supreme Court.

== Career ==
Mahmood, along with 22 others, were appointed Judges of the High Court Division on 9 October 2024 following the fall of the Sheikh Hasina led Awami League government. He was appointed to the International Crimes Tribunal for the trial of Sheikh Hasina and other members of her government on charges of genocide. He along with Justice Md Golam Mortuza Majumder and judge Md Mohitul Haque Enam Chowdhury were appointed to the tribunal by the Muhammad Yunus led interim government.
