= Stephen Kaye (disambiguation) =

Stephen Kaye is a judge of the Supreme Court of Victoria.

Stephen Kaye may also refer to:

- Stephen Kaye of the Kaye baronets
- Steve Kaye, musician
- Stephen Kaye, chairman of Hay Group

== See also ==
- Stephen Kay, American actor, director and film writer
- Stephen Kay (architect), American golf course architect
- Steven Kay, model
