= Abul Kalam Azad (politician, born 1947) =

Bangladeshi war criminal (born 1947)

- আবুল কালাম আজাদ
- Born: 5 March 1947 (age 79); Faridpur, Bengal Province, British Raj
- Other name: Bacchu Razakar
- Occupations: Politician, televangelist
- Organization: Kharadia Military
- Known for: Collaboration
- Political party: Bangladesh Jamaat-e-Islami
- Status: Evading execution
- Allegiance: Al-Badr; Kharadia Military
- Penalty: Death by hanging (in absentia)
- Wanted by: Government of Bangladesh
- Wanted since: 2013

Details
- Killed: 14

Abul Kalam Azad (born 5 March 1947), also known by the nickname Bacchu Razakar, is a former Bangladeshi politician of Bangladesh Jamaat-e-Islami, televangelist and convicted war criminal of the Bangladeshi War of Independence. He was also the leader and founder of Kharadia Military.

He was the first of nine prominent Jamaat-e-Islami members accused of war crimes by the International Crimes Tribunal-2 of Bangladesh to be convicted for crimes against humanity, including murder and rape. On 21 January 2013, Azad was sentenced to death by hanging for his crimes.

== Early life ==
Abul Kalam Azad was born on 5 March 1947, the son of an impoverished farmer, Abdus Salam Mia, of Barakhardia village under Saltha Police Station of Faridpur District. After attending a Qawmi madrasa, he was a student at Rajendra College in Faridpur.

== Career ==
=== Social activism ===
In the 1980s, Azad became a regular speaker at a major mosque in Dhaka. He also led an Islamic charity. In 1999, he founded the MACCA, a social charity. Reflecting on its activities, he said "We strongly believe that religion and development should work together to help people. We believe development work is only sustainable through religion; otherwise sustainable development is impossible". As part of his social activism, he involved MACCA in an awareness campaign against AIDS.

=== Televangelism ===
He anchored a TV show called Apnar Jiggasa (আপনার জিজ্ঞাসা), or Your Questions in Bangladesh, NTV for several years before the trial.

== Controversy ==
=== Bangladesh War of 1971 ===
The investigations alleged that during the Bangladesh War of 1971, he then known as "Bacchu", aged 24, was a close associate of Ali Ahsan Mohammad Mojaheed, then president of the East Pakistan Islami Chhatra Sangha, the student wing of East Pakistan Jamaat-e-Islami. The prosecution alleged that before the formation of Razakar paramilitary force, Azad actively aided the Pakistani army in committing criminal acts.

The prosecution alleged that Azad had assisted the Pakistani military as the chief of the Al-Badr force in Faridpur; the members of the force were young men mostly drawn from colleges. He was able to speak Urdu well because he had studied in a madrasa. As a close associate of the Pakistani army, he participated in committing atrocities on civilians, including the Hindu community and pro-independence Bengalis. His defence counsel calls these allegations false.

==== In absentia trial ====
In 2010, the government of Bangladesh established the International Crimes Tribunal under a 1973 act of Parliament. It has indicted nine suspects who are prominent leaders of the Jamaat-e-Islami, and two who are leaders of the Bangladesh Nationalist Party (BNP). The government was responding to popular support to have the trials and settle longstanding accusations dating to the liberation war of 1971.

The trial was held in absentia because Azad went into hiding hours before Tribunal-2 issued an arrest warrant against him on 3 April 2012. He is believed to have fled to India or Pakistan. The court appointed a defence attorney for him, Supreme Court lawyer Abdus Sukur Khan.

Azad was indicted on eight counts for murder, rape and genocide. Investigators alleged that they had identified 14 people murdered by Bachchu: three were women he had raped and nine were other abducted civilians. Testimony was offered by 22 prosecution witnesses, including friends and families of the victims. The prosecution said that Bacchu had burnt down at least five houses, looted 15, and forced at least nine Hindus to convert to Islam.

In January 2013, his trial was the first to be completed; he was convicted of war crimes, on six of eight counts, including murder of unarmed civilians and rape committed during the war. On 21 January 2013, Azad was sentenced to death in absentia.

== Current status ==
Azad is currently believed to have fled to India or Pakistan. MACCA, the organisation founded by him, has disavowed him.
