= Toby Cadman =

British international lawyer

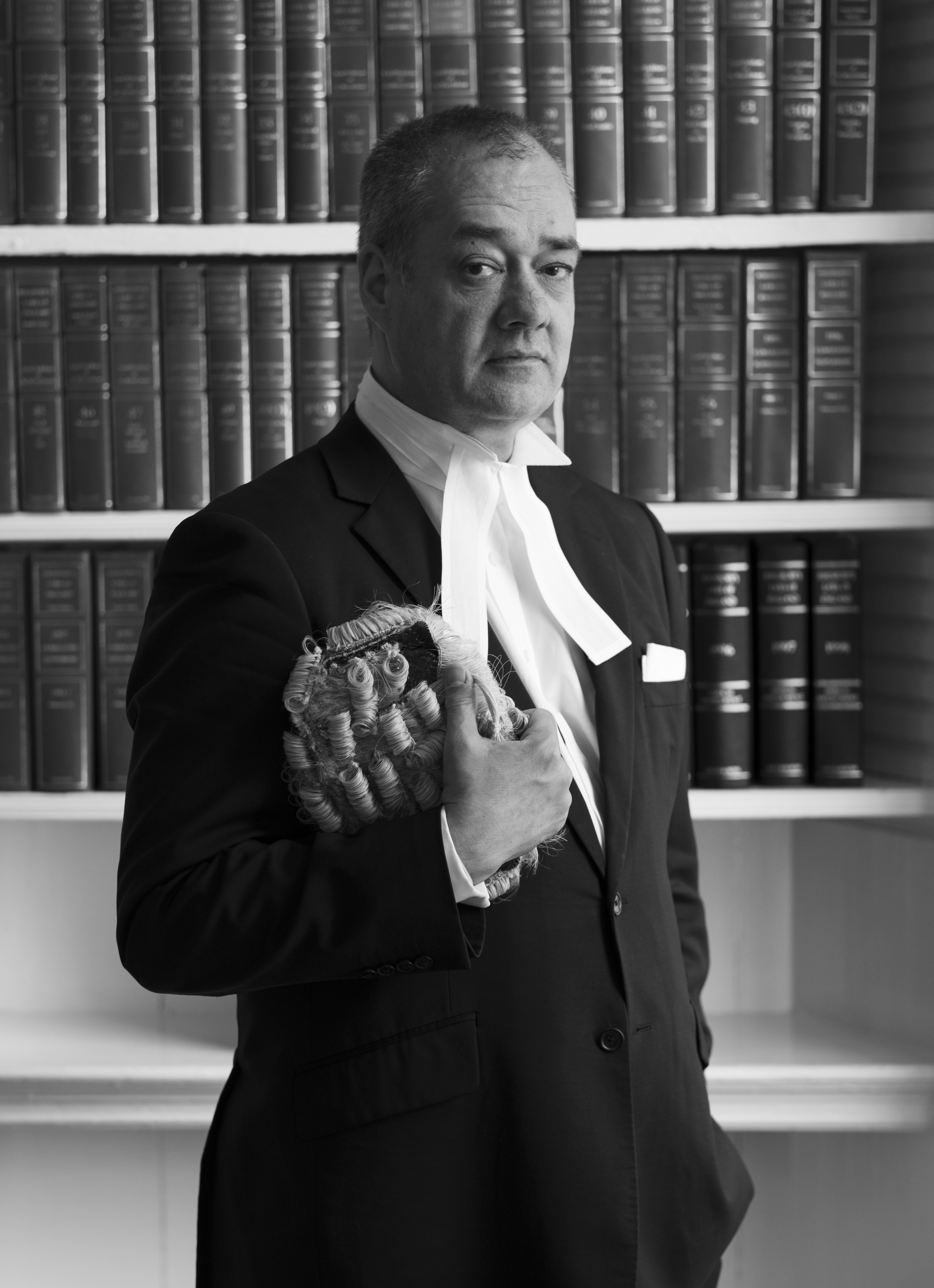
- Cadman in 2019
- Born: February , 1971; United Kingdom
- Education: University of Northampton
- Occupation: Barrister
- Years active: 2001–present

Special Advisor to the Chief Prosecutor of International Crimes Tribunal
- Incumbent
- Assumed office 2024

Toby Cadman is a British international human rights lawyer, co-founder, and joint head of Guernica 37 Chambers, a London-based set of chambers specializing in international criminal and humanitarian law. He has experience in representing individuals in high-profile international legal matters, including war crimes, genocide, terrorism, and corruption.

== Early life and education ==
Toby Cadman was born in February 1971 in the United Kingdom. He attended University of Northampton, where he earned his Bachelor of Laws (LLB) degree and later attended for a Master's in Public International Law.

Cadman later pursued further professional training and education, which included completing the Bar Vocational Course at the BPP Law School, which allowed him to specialize in areas of law that would serve his international human rights and criminal law practice.

== Career ==
Cadman started his legal career in the United Kingdom, where he first practiced as a barrister. He later co-founded G37 Chambers in London, specialising in international criminal law, human rights law, and extradition.

Cadman has worked on several high-profile cases, including representing in the defense of Nasim Haradinaj and Haxhi Shala at the Kosovo Specialist Chambers, which investigates crimes committed during and after the Kosovo War.

Cadman has also been involved in investigations into crimes related to the Saudi-led coalition's actions in Yemen, war crimes and crimes against humanity committed by the Assad Regime in the context of the Syrian Revolution and represented individuals in extradition proceedings and anti-corruption cases.

He is currently the Special Advisor to the Chief Prosecutor of the International Crimes Tribunal of Bangladesh, where he previously acted for the defense of senior members of the former government accused of crimes against humanity during the Bangladesh Liberation War.

== Cases ==
Cadman has been involved in several international humanitarian cases as an international human rights lawyer:

- Kosovo Specialist Chambers; The Prosecutor v. Haxhi Shala: Cadman served as lead counsel for Haxhi Shala, who faced accusations related to obstructing justice during the Kosovo War. This involved investigating war crimes committed by various actors during the conflict.
- International Crimes Tribunal, Bangladesh: Cadman is currently the Special Advisor to the Chief Prosecutor in the International Crimes Tribunal, which initially prosecuted war crimes and genocide committed during the Bangladesh Liberation War. He is now involved in the legal proceedings of charges against Sheikh Hasina, relating to crimes against humanity and massacres committed during the Student-People's Uprising and throughout her authoritarian regime.
- ICC investigation into the Saudi-led coalition's actions in Yemen: Cadman led efforts to investigate violations of international law during the Yemen Civil War, particularly regarding the actions of the Saudi-led coalition. This included filing an Article 15 Communication with the International Criminal Court (ICC) to open an investigation into war crimes.
- Extradition of Andrei Lugovoi: Cadman represented the Russian former Federal Security Service officer Andrei Lugovoi, who was accused in the 2006 Alexander Litvinenko poisoning case in London. Cadman advised on extradition procedures related to the case.
- Universal jurisdiction actions against Bashar al-Assad for crimes against humanity: Cadman has also worked on multiple investigations targeting the Syrian government under Bashar al-Assad for its role in alleged war crimes and crimes against humanity during the Syrian Civil War.
- Rohingya genocide case: Cadman has been involved in the Rohingya genocide legal proceedings, contributing to international efforts to hold Myanmar accountable for crimes committed against the Rohingya Muslim minority. This includes the International Court of Justice (ICJ) case The Gambia v. Myanmar, which was filed by The Gambia.
- Bosnian war crimes cases: Cadman worked on numerous cases relating to war crimes, rape and ethnic cleansing committed during the Bosnian War (1992–1995). He served as Senior International Lawyer at the Human Rights Chamber for Bosnia and Herzegovina in Sarajevo, assisting in the legal efforts.
- Prosecutor v. Laurent Gbagbo (ICC): Cadman has worked on matters before the International Criminal Court (ICC), specifically on the case against Laurent Gbagbo, the former President of Côte d'Ivoire, accused of crimes against humanity during post-election violence in 2010-2011.

== Academic contributions ==
Toby Cadman has made several academic contributions to the fields of international criminal law, human rights law, and transitional justice. His work includes published articles, lectures, and participation in academic and professional forums. Below are some notable highlights of his academic contributions:

- "PDF TRAINING MANUAL Accountability Mechanisms for Crimes Committed in Syria". Toby Cadman & Natacha Barcq. International Bar Association. 3 November 2018.
- Toby Cadman. "Accountability for War Crimes in Yemen". Guernica 37 International Justice Chambers Blog. United Kingdom: Guernica 37 - Yemen Accountability.
- Cadman, Toby (27 June 2023). The Role of International Tribunals in Post-Conflict Justice (Speech). King's College London. kcl.ac.uk. London, UK: Centro Guernica.

== Recognition ==
Cadman had been recognized and listed as a leading barrister in Public International Law in The Legal 500 as well as getting ranked among top barristers in International Criminal Law from Chambers and Partners. He was also awarded the Global Human Rights Defender Award by Guernica 37 International Justice Chambers and the UK Bar Council Certificate of Merit, which recognised him for his contribution to the international criminal law. He has been also interviewed by various news channels, including BBC, Aljazeera, Middle East Eye, The Guardian and The New York Times.

== Personal life ==
Cadman is an enthusiast of martial arts, particularly Shaolin Kung Fu.
