= Cayol =

Cayol is a French surname. People with the surname include:

- Bartolomé Cayol (c. 1800–1877), French engineer and businessman
- Lucien Cayol (1893–1960), French World War I flying ace
- Pierre Cayol (born 14 August 1939), French contemporary painter
- Raymond Cayol (1917–1997), French politician
