= Rajshahi Advocate Bar Association =

- Formation: 1868
- Headquarters: Dhaka, Bangladesh
- Region served: Bangladesh
- Official language: Bengali
- Website: raba.com.bd//

Rajshahi Advocate Bar Association is the bar association for lawyers of Rajshahi District. Abul Kashem is the President of the Rajshahi Advocate Bar Association.

== History ==
Rajshahi Advocate Bar Association was established in 1868 during the British rule of India.

Following the November 2005 Bangladesh court bombing by Jamaat-ul-Mujahideen, targeting judges for enforcing the secular legal system of Bangladesh, the Rajshahi Advocate Bar Association brought out protests in Rajshahi with black flags. It also protested the 2005 Jhalakathi bombing targeting judges.

In February 2019, the Rajshahi Advocate Bar Association punished 16 lawyers aligned with the Bangladesh Nationalist Party for embezzling 12.8 million BDT from the benevolent fund of the Association.

== Notable members ==
- Ghulam Arieff Tipoo, Chief Prosecutor, International Crimes Tribunal
