= Ghulam Arieff Tipoo =

Bangladeshi jurist and language movement activist (1931–2024)

- গোলাম আরিফ টিপু

Chief Prosecutor of International Crimes Tribunal
- In office 25 March 2010 – 15 March 2024
- Succeeded by: Mohammad Tajul Islam

Personal details
- Born: 28 August 1931 Chapainawabganj, Rajshahi Division, Bengal Presidency, British India
- Died: 15 March 2024 (aged 92) Dhaka, Bangladesh
- Education: Rajshahi College; Dhaka University
- Occupation: Jurist
- Awards: Ekushey Padak (2019)

Ghulam Arieff Tipoo (Bengali: গোলাম আরিফ টিপু; 28 August 1931 – 15 March 2024) was a Bangladeshi jurist, independence activist, and language movement activist. He was the Chief Prosecutor of the International Crimes Tribunal, a domestic war crimes tribunal in Bangladesh set up to investigate and prosecute suspects for the genocide committed during the Bangladesh Liberation War.

== Early life ==
Tipoo was born on 28 August 1931 at Kamalakantapur village of Shibganj Upazila in Chapainawabganj of the then British India (now Bangladesh). He was the second son among the nine children of his parents. He completed his Secondary School Certificate from Kaliachar school in 1948 and Higher Secondary School Certificate from Rajshahi College in 1950. He graduated from the same college in 1952. He earned his post-graduate degree from Dhaka University. He was the General Secretary of the Bangladesh Students Union from 1954 to 1956.

== Career ==
Tipoo started his career as a lawyer in 1958. He served as the President of Rajshahi Advocate Bar Association. He was one of the senate and syndicate members of Rajshahi University. He was also on the committee of Bangladesh Bar Council.

Tipoo fought in the Bangladesh Liberation War.

The 1952 Language Movement in the Rajshahi area was organized mainly under his leadership. He was the joint convener of Rastrabhasa Sangram Parishad in that area. In recognition of his contribution to the Bengali language movement, the government of Bangladesh awarded him the country's second highest civilian award, the Ekushey Padak in 2019.

Tipoo was appointed the Chief Prosecutor of the International Crimes Tribunal in 2010.

== Personal life ==
Tipoo was married to Jahan Ara Chowdhury Lui; the couple had three daughters and one son.

== Death ==
Tipoo died on 15 March 2024, at the age of 92.
