= Char Bhadrasan massacre =

Coordinates: 23.57°N 90.00°E

Char Bhadrasan massacre চরভদ্রাসন গণহত্যা
- Part of Bangladesh genocide
- Location: Char Bhadrasan, Faridpur, East Pakistan
- Date: May 1971 (UTC+6:00)
- Target: Bengali Hindus
- Attack type: Mass murder, Massacre
- Weapon: Rifles
- Deaths: 50–60
- Perpetrators: Pakistani Army, Razakars

Char Bhadrasan massacre (Bengali: চরভদ্রাসন গণহত্যা) refers to the massacre of around 60 unarmed Bengali Hindu residents in Char Bhadrasan in Faridpur district of East Pakistan by the Pakistani occupation army and the Razakars in the middle of May 1971. Ali Ahsan Mohammad Mojaheed, the leader of Jamaat-e-Islami led a team of Razakars and Pakistani army to the Hindu-dominated villages of Baidyadangi, Majhidangi and Baladangi where they massacred 50–60 unarmed Bengali Hindus. The attackers set fire to 300–350 Hindu households forcing them to flee the country.

== Background ==
Char Bhadrasan is located on the southern bank of the Padma. The area is dominated by sandbanks along the river, which are known for changing their course over time, submerging existing sandbanks and creating new sandbanks in the process. The word Char literally means a sandbank. The villages of Baidyadangi, Majhidangi and Baladangi, located on these sandbanks were Hindu villages inhabited by the peasant and fishermen castes.

On the evening of 25 March, the Pakistani occupation army launched the Operation Searchlight. As the army took control of Dhaka and began to proceed towards the districts, the local collaborators began to organize pro-Pakistani paramilitary organizations like the Al Badr and Al Shams to resist the freedom fighters.

== Events ==
In the middle of May, Ali Ahsan Mohammad Mojaheed, the secretary of East Pakistan Islami Chhatra Sangha and a commander of Al Badr along with one Hammad Maulana, led a group of eight to ten non-Bengali Muslims along with a contingent of the Pakistani occupation army in an attack in the Hindu-dominated villages in Char Bhadrasan. In one morning in the middle of May, at around 6 a.m. the attackers surrounded the three villages of Baidyadangi, Majhidangi and Baladangi from three sides. They looted and set fire to 300-350 Hindu households and around 50 to 60 unarmed Hindu men and raped women, while the rest fled.

The majority of the Hindus fled to India after the massacre. Their properties were usurped by the Razakars and their supporters. Gradually the Hindus became a minority in the area. Later on the village of Baidyadangi was lost due to river erosion.

== See also ==
- Ali Ahsan Mohammad Mojaheed
