= Chankharpul massacre =

July massacre in Chankharpul, Dhaka, Bangladesh

- Part of the July massacre
- Top to bottom: Police stand ready as protesters advance. Officers firing tear gas down the road. APBN Constable Sujon Hossain shooting at protesters from afar.
- Location: Chankharpul, Dhaka, Bangladesh
- Date: August 5, 2024; 2 years ago
- Attack type: Massacre
- Weapons: Tear gas; Grenade launcher; Type 56 assault rifle; SKS; Shotgun; Sound grenade
- Deaths: 7
- Injuries: 4+
- Victims: Student protesters; Political opposition; Civilians
- Perpetrators: Bangladesh Police; Armed Police Battalion; Dhaka Metropolitan Police
- Assailant: Government of Bangladesh

The Chankharpul massacre (Bengali: চানখারপুল গণহত্যা) occurred on August 5, 2024, during a mass protest in the Chankharpul area of Dhaka, Bangladesh. This protest was part of the broader Long March to Dhaka, which emerged as a part of the larger July Uprising. The demonstrators were primarily students and activists, and they intended to march from the Shahbagh area to Ganabhaban, the official residence of the Prime Minister, Sheikh Hasina, demanding her resignation.

The protest was organized by the Students Against Discrimination and was a reaction to issues related to systemic inequalities and the government's handling of political dissent. The protesters called for substantial political reforms, including changes in government policy and a review of administrative practices they viewed as discriminatory.

On the morning of August 5, 2024, units from the Dhaka Metropolitan Police and the Armed Police Battalion (APBN) were deployed to the Chankharpul area to prevent protesters from advancing through Shahbagh towards the Ganabhaban. Initially, law enforcement used tear gas, sound grenades, and rubber bullets to disperse the crowd. But some officers, including Constable Md. Sujon Hossain of the Armed Police Battalion, fired live ammunition indiscriminately at the protesters, leading to the deaths of seven and injuries to several others.

Among the seven fatalities was Shahriar Khan Anas, a tenth-grade student at Adarsha Academy in Gendaria, Old Dhaka. Before participating in the protest, Anas wrote his parents a letter expressing his commitment to the cause. He was fatally shot three times by the police in the Chankharpul area. His body was recovered from Dhaka Mitford Hospital and laid to rest at Jurain Cemetery. After his death, Deen Nath Sen Road in Gendaria was renamed Shahid Anas Road (lit. 'Martyr Anas Road') in his honour. On September 12, over a month after the incident, Constable Sujon Hossain was arrested for his involvement in the massacre.

The Chankharpul massacre was part of a series of violent incidents during the July Revolution. By early August, the unrest had resulted in a significant death toll, with reports of at least 1,000. On January 12, 2025, the International Crimes Tribunal jailed Constable Sujon Hossain after he was arrested for the killings of seven people during the confrontation in the Chankharpul area.
