= Mohammad Tajul Islam =

Bangladeshi lawyer

- মোহাম্মদ তাজুল ইসলাম
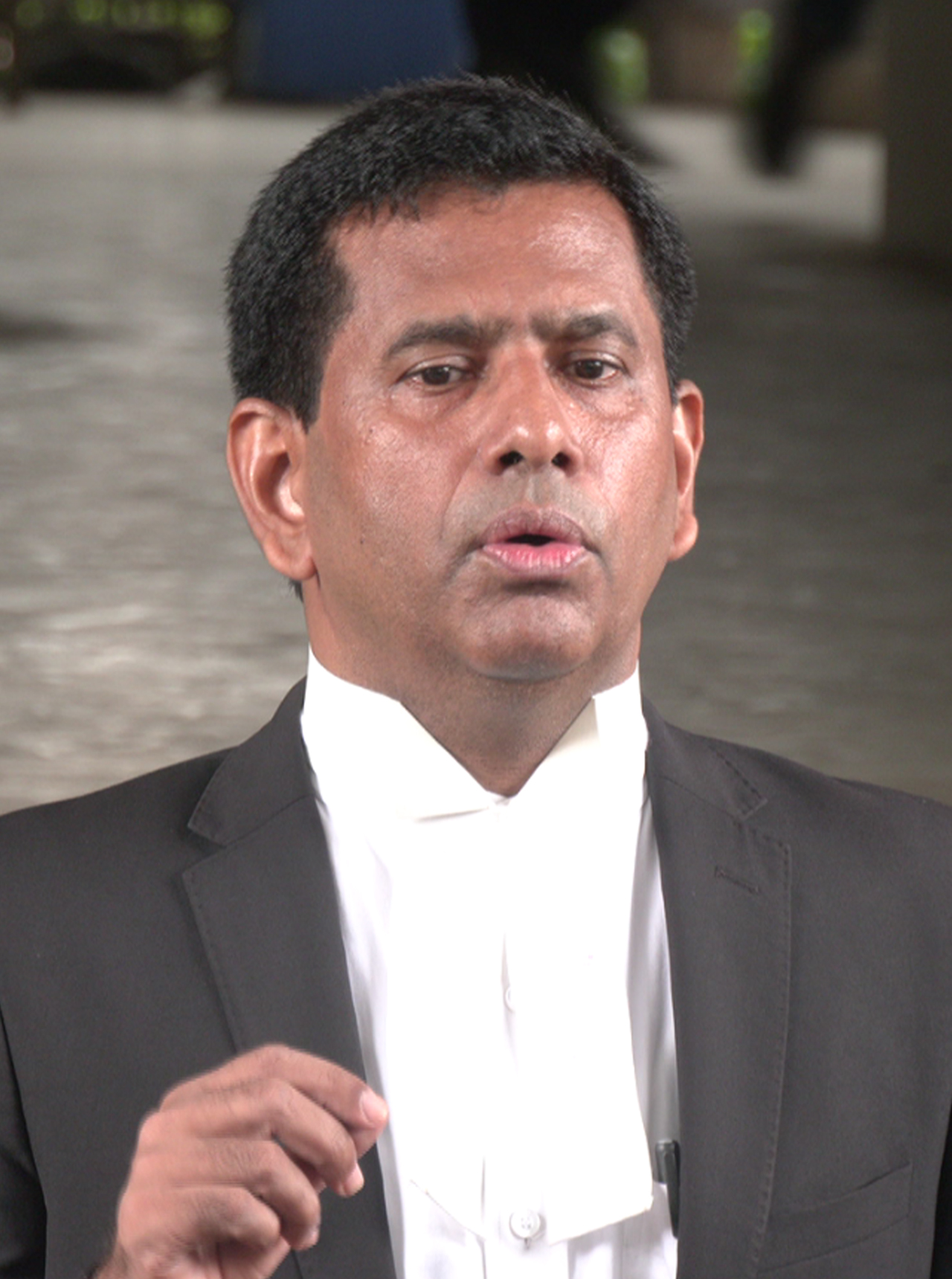
- Islam in 2024

Chief Prosecutor of the International Crimes Tribunal
- In office 7 September 2024 – 23 February 2026
- President: Mohammed Shahabuddin
- Chief Adviser: Muhammad Yunus
- Preceded by: Ghulam Arieff Tipoo

Personal details
- Born: March 25, 1973 (age 53) Jamalpur, Bangladesh
- Education: L.L.B (Hons), L.L.M, University of Rajshahi

Mohammad Tajul Islam (Bengali: মোহাম্মদ তাজুল ইসলাম) is a Bangladeshi lawyer at the Bangladesh Supreme Court who was the Chief Prosecutor of the International Crimes Tribunal.

He was appointed to the position on 7 September 2024 by the newly formed interim government of Bangladesh, following the resignation of Sheikh Hasina as the Prime Minister of the country. Prior to his appointment, he served as a defence lawyer at the tribunal.

== Early life and education ==
Islam was born on 25 March 1973 in Jamalpur District. He completed his Secondary School Certificate from Jamalpur Zilla School and Higher Secondary Certificate from Government Ashek Mahmud College, Jamalpur. He earned an LL.B. (Hons) in 1995 and an LL.M. in 1996 from the University of Rajshahi.

== Career ==
He began his legal career in 1998 after registering with the Bangladesh Bar Council and was enrolled as an advocate of the Bangladesh Supreme Court on 30 January 1999. He was appointed as the Chief Prosecutor of the International Crimes Tribunal on 7 September 2024 with the status of Attorney General.

Tajul Islam was a defense lawyer of leaders of Bangladesh Jamaat-e-Islami charged with war crimes at the International Crimes Tribunal, and had worked with Barrister Abdur Razzaq. He defended Jamat's Leader Abdul Quader Molla at the International Crimes Tribunal in 2013, who was sentenced to death. He was the defense lawyer of Ali Ahsan Mohammad Mujaheed, secretary general of Bangladesh Jamaat-e-Islami, and charged with committing war crimes during the Bangladesh Liberation War.

In March 2015, Islam was briefly detained by Bangladesh Police.

Islam, a Supreme Court lawyer, was appointed as the Chief Prosecutor of the International Crimes Tribunal by the government on 7 September 2024. His appointment was formalized through a gazette notification issued by the law ministry, granting him the status of the Attorney General. He resigned from the post of joint convener of Amar Bangladesh Party before taking charge. Tajul Islam has previously represented several Jamaat-e-Islami leaders in cases before the ICT.

Following his appointment, Tajul Islam highlighted the challenges ahead, including handling cases involving high-profile political figures. He emphasized the complexities involved in gathering, compiling, and presenting evidence and expressed the need for restructuring the tribunal's team by appointing new judges and investigators.

== See also ==
- International Crimes Tribunal (Bangladesh)
