= Trinquier =

Trinquier is a surname. Notable people with the surname include:

- Angélique Trinquier (born 1991), Monégasque swimmer
- Michel Trinquier (born 1931), French painter
- Roger Trinquier (1908–1986), French Army officer and counter-insurgency theorist
