= Charbhadrasan Upazila =

Charbhadrasan চরভদ্রাসন
- Upazila
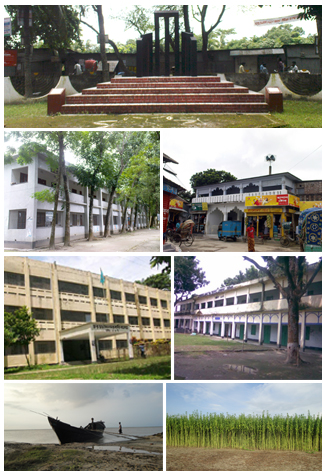
- (clockwise from top):Central Shaheed Minar, Charbhadrasan Central Masque, Charbhadrasan Pilot High School, Jute Field, Gopalpur Ghat of Padma, Charbhadrasan Govt. College, Upazila Nirbahi Officer’s Office.

- Coordinates: 23°33.5′N 90°5′E
- Country: Bangladesh
- Division: Dhaka
- District: Faridpur
- Establishment: 1914 CE

Area
  - Total: 154.65 km^{2} (59.71 sq mi)
- Elevation: 8 m (26 ft)

Population (2022)
  - Total: 70,923
  - Density: 458.60/km^{2} (1,187.8/sq mi)
- Time zone: UTC+6 (BST)
- Postal code: 7810
- National calling code: +880
- Calling code: 06315
- Website: charbhadrasan.faridpur.gov.bd

Charbhadrasan or Char Bhadrasan (Bengali: চরভদ্রাসন) is an upazila of Faridpur District in Dhaka Division, Bangladesh.

== Geography ==
Charbhadrasan is located at 23.5583°N 90.0833°E. It has 14,277 households and total area 154.65 km^{2}. Char Bhadrasan is bordered by Manikganj district to the north, Dhaka district to the east across the Padma, Sadarpur upazila to the south, and Nagarkanda and Faridpur Sadar upazilas to the west.

== Demographics ==
Religions in Charbhadrasan Upazila (2022)
Religion	Percent
Islam	94.25%
Hinduism	5.75%

According to the 2022 Bangladeshi census, Char Bhadrasan Upazila had 17,285 households and a population of 70,923. 9.72% of the population were under 5 years of age. Char Bhadrasan had a literacy rate (age 7 and over) of 66.82%: 66.94% for males and 66.71% for females, and a sex ratio of 89.30 males for every 100 females. 28,978 (40.86%) lived in urban areas.

As of the 2011 Census of Bangladesh, Charbhadrasan upazila had 14,277 households and a population of 63,477. 15,498 (24.42%) were under 10 years of age. Charbhadrasan had an average literacy rate of 40.52%, compared to the national average of 51.8%, and a sex ratio of 1091 females per 1000 males. 22,882 (36.05%) of the population lived in urban areas.

As of the 1991 Bangladesh census, Charbhadrasan has a population of 69,876. Males constitute 51.36% of the population, and females 48.64%. This Upazila's eighteen up population is 34758. Charbhadrasan has an average literacy rate of 20.5% (7+ years), and the national average of 32.4% literate.

== Administration ==
Charbhadrasan thana was established in 1914 at Charsalehpur. It was turned into an upazila in 1983.

Charbhadrasan Upazila is divided into four union parishads: Charbhadrasan, Char Harirampur, Char Jahukanda, and Gazirtek. The union parishads are subdivided into 24 mauzas and 80 villages.

== Education ==
The pass level Charbhadrasan Government College, founded in 1969, is the only college.

According to Banglapedia, Char Bhadrasan Pilot High School, founded in 1946, and Char Hajiganj High School (1964) are notable secondary schools.

== See also ==
- Upazilas of Bangladesh
- Districts of Bangladesh
- Divisions of Bangladesh
- Char Bhadrasan massacre, 1971 massacre of Hindu residents by the Pakistan army
- Administrative geography of Bangladesh
