= Steven Kay =

British international criminal lawyer

Steven Walton Kay, KC (born 4 August 1954) is a British international criminal lawyer.

Educated at Epsom College and the University of Leeds, he was called to the bar at the Inner Temple in 1977. He became a Queen's Counsel (QC) in 1997. He was appointed to defend Slobodan Milosevic at his war crimes trial.

He has acted as counsel for Delawar Hossain Sayedee, deputy of Jamaat-e-Islami and accused of war crimes in 1971 by the International Crimes Tribunal (ICT) in Bangladesh. Kay has criticised the tribunal and the amendments to its authorizing act, stating, "The current system of war crimes trial and its law in Bangladesh does not include international concerns, required to ensure a fair, impartial and transparent trial." Sayeedi was convicted in February 2013 and sentenced to death for his crimes.
