= Michel Trinquier =

French painter (born 1931)

- Born: 12 October 1931 (age 94); Avignon, France
- Education: Beaux-Arts d'Avignon
- Known for: Painting
- Movement: Groupe de l'Atelier
- Awards: Grand Prix du Festival d'Avignon, 1961

Michel Trinquier (born 12 October 1931, in Avignon) is a French painter.

== Biography ==
He starts painting in studying after school at "collège Saint Jean-Baptiste de La Salle in Avignon and becomes member of the "Groupe de l'Atelier". He is also found of paleontology.

In the 1960s he discovers Belle-Ile, an island in the Atlantic ocean and he starts to work through "collages" including sand, ropes or shellfish in his paintings.

In 1961 he receives the "Grand prix de peinture du festival d'art dramatique d'Avignon" for a painting now in musée Calvet in Avignon.

== Main exhibitions ==
- 1973 : Galerie Barbizon, rue des Saint-Pères in Paris
- 1973 : Galerie Transposition, boulevard Raspail in Paris
- 1987 : Salon international d'art contemporain in Toulouse
- 1992 : Galerie Bonias in L'Isle-sur-Sorgue
- 1993 : fondation Vasarely in château de Gordes
- 1995 : Galerie Vincente Beneat in Barcelona
- 2017 : Palais des évêques de Bourg-Saint-Andéol
- 2021 : Atelier-galerie Valérie Gautier, Sauzon

== Books ==
Michel Trinquier has illustrated a poetry book together with Eugène Baboulène, Pierre Cayol, Hervé Di Rosa and Pierre François , les 81 poèmes de Claude Garcia-Forner, Rayon Bleu
