= Golam Mortuza Mozumder =

Bangladeshi judge (born 1960)

The Honourable Golam Mortuza Mozumder

Justice of the High Court Division of the Supreme Court of Bangladesh
- Incumbent
- Assumed office 8 October 2024

Chairman of the International Crimes Tribunal-1
- Incumbent
- Assumed office 14 October 2024
- Preceded by: Md. Abu Ahmed Jamadar

Personal details
- Born: 15 January 1960 (age 66)
- Education: University of Dhaka
- Profession: Judge

Golam Mortuza Mozumder (Bengali: গোলাম মর্তুজা মজুমদার; born 15 January 1960) is a Justice of the High Court Division of the Supreme Court of Bangladesh and the Chairman of the International Crimes Tribunal.

== Early life ==
Golam Mortuza was born on 15 January 1960. He completed his LLB and LLM from the University of Dhaka.

== Career ==
Mortuza passed the BCS (Judicial Cadre) in 1982 and joined the service as an Assistant Judge on 20 April 1983. He retired as a District and Sessions Judge on 14 January 2019. In 2008, he served as a special judge in the MiG-29 corruption case involving Sheikh Hasina. After his retirement from judicial service, Mortuza taught law at ASA University Bangladesh.

On 8 October 2024, Mortuza was appointed as an additional judge in the High Court Division of the Bangladesh Supreme Court. Later on 14 October, he was appointed as the Chairman of the International Crimes Tribunal. On November 17, 2025, the International Crimes Tribunal-1, led by Golam Mortuja Majumder, sentenced Bangladesh's former Prime Minister Sheikh Hasina to death.
