= Ali Ahsan Mohammad Mojaheed =

Bangladeshi politician convicted of war crimes (1948–2015)

- আলী আহসান মুহাম্মদ মুজাহিদ
- Mojaheed in 2010

Minister of Social Welfare
- In office 2001–2006
- Prime Minister: Begum Khaleda Zia
- Preceded by: Rokeya Afzal Rahman
- Succeeded by: Yasmeen Murshed

Personal details
- Born: 23 June 1948
- Died: 22 November 2015 (aged 67) Dhaka Central Jail, Dhaka, Bangladesh
- Resting place: Khabaspur, Faridpur
- Party: Bangladesh Jamaat-e-Islami
- Education: University of Dhaka
- Occupation: Politician

Ali Ahsan Mohammad Mojaheed (Note: Bengali: আলী আহসান মুহাম্মদ মুজাহিদ) (23 June 1948 – 22 November 2015) was a Bangladeshi politician and convicted war criminal who served as a Member of Parliament and as the Minister of Social Welfare from 2001 to 2006.

He was found to have been second in command of the Al-Badr paramilitary force in 1971, which committed war crimes during the Bangladesh Liberation War. On 17 July 2013, he was found guilty of genocide, conspiracy in the mass killings of Bengali intellectuals, and abduction by the International Crimes Tribunal-2 and sentenced to death for two of the seven charges brought against him.

The High Court rejected his review petition on 18 November 2015. He was hanged on 22 November 2015. Until his death, he was the Secretary General of far-right Islamist party, Bangladesh Jamaat-e-Islami.

== Early life ==
Mojaheed was born in 1948 in Faridpur District. His father, Mohammad Ali, an Islamic scholar, was a member of the East Pakistan Central Peace Committee during the Liberation War with involvement in crimes against humanity. After the independence of Bangladesh, he was acquitted by Sheikh Mujibur Rahman from trials on request of local Awami League leaders. After completing schooling from Faridpur, Mojaheed took admission to the Dhaka University in 1970.

== Political career ==
=== During the 1971 War ===
In 1968, Mojaheed became the Faridpur district president of East Pakistan Islami Chhatra Sangha. In 1970, he took admission at the Dhaka University. After moving to Dhaka, he became the Dhaka district president of Islami Chhatra Sangha. Around August–September 1970, Mojaheed became the Secretary of the East Pakistan Islami Chhatra Sangha, the provincial wing of the Nikhil Pakistan Islami Chhatra Sangha.

In October 1971, he was elected as the president of East Pakistan Islami Chhatra Sangha. On 17 October, Mojaheed addressed an Islami Chhatra Sangha meeting at Rangpur, where he directed the students to join Al-Badr.

Prosecutors at the International Crimes Tribunal in their formal charge stated that Mojaheed had taken over as the supreme commander of the Al Badr forces from Motiur Rahman Nizami in October 1971. He was accused by the prosecution of having led a group that looted around 300–350 Hindu houses and killed around 50–60 Hindus in May 1971. On the occasion, Mojaheed put forward a four-point declaration, which included a refusal to recognise Hindustan (India) as a sovereign state; a vow that the Al-Badr would not rest until Hindustan was erased from the map of the world, and a boycott on selling, publicising, or keeping books either written by or in favour of Hindus.

=== Post war ===
Mojaheed contested the parliamentary elections in 1986, 1991, 1996, 2001 and 2008. Except for 2001, he lost all the elections in which he ran. Between 2001 and 2006, he was the Minister of Social Welfare.

== War crimes trial ==
=== Prosecution ===
Mojaheed's trial at the International Crimes Tribunal of Bangladesh (ICT) began on 19 July 2012. On 11 December 2011, the prosecution charged him with 34 offences. The tribunal indicted Mojaheed on two counts of genocide against the Bengali Hindus and five counts of crimes against humanity for killing, forced deportation, abduction, torture and arson. Among the victims listed in the charges was Serajuddin Hossain, who was the executive editor of The Daily Ittefaq in 1971.

Opposition parties and human rights groups alleged political interference in the trial, given that all of the accused were leading opposition politicians. The ICT delivered its verdict on 17 July 2013, two days after ICT-1 sentenced war criminal Ghulam Azam to 90 years in prison.

=== Skype controversy ===
In late 2012, the ICT was the centre of a controversy after Skype conversations and e-mails between the head judge, Nizamul Huq and Ahmed Ziauddin, a Brussels-based lawyer were leaked. According to The Economist, the recordings and emails suggested that the Bangladesh Government pressured and attempted to intervene in the International Crimes Tribunal to speed proceedings up. The neutrality and independence of Huq was also called into question, as Ziauddin appeared to help him to prepare documents for the tribunal and make detailed recommendations for Huq, and informed Huq about how the prosecutors may develop their case while in contact with the prosecution. Nizamul Huq later resigned from the post of head judge of the tribunal.

=== Conviction ===
On 17 July 2013, Mojaheed was found guilty of war crimes including genocide, conspiracy in killing intellectuals, torture and abduction during the 1971 war and was sentenced to death for two of the five charges brought against him. He was convicted on the charge related to the killing of Rumi, Badi, Jewel, Azad and Altaf Mahmud at the army camp set up in Nakhalpara, Dhaka, during the war. Defence lawyer Abdur Razzaq claimed that this verdict was unfair.

On 14 October 2015, Mojaheed filed a review petition with the Supreme Court of Bangladesh against the sentence. On 18 November 2015, the High Court of Bangladesh upheld the death sentence of Ali Ahsan, rejecting his pleas for reviewing death penalties. According to jail officials and the Minister for Justice, Mojaheed asked for mercy in a petition to the President of Bangladesh, but his appeal was rejected. His family denied that he had made any such petition.

== Death ==
On 22 November 2015, 12:45 AM, GMT+6, Mojaheed was hanged at Dhaka Central Jail. The execution was reported by the Minister for Justice, Anisul Huq. At the same time and place, another Bangladeshi politician, Salahuddin Quader Chowdhury, was hanged for war crime charges. Ahsan was buried at his hometown Faridpur after his namaz-e-janaza had held on Adarsha Academy's Ideal Madrasa ground at West Khabaspur of the town.

=== Reactions ===
==== Domestic reactions ====
Ahsan's party, Bangladesh Jamaat-e-Islami, offered funeral prayers in absentia on 22 November morning, and called for a strike across the country on 23 November 2015. Thirteen treasury bench of the Jatiyo Sangsad praised and congratulated the then Prime Minister Sheikh Hasina for executing the two top accused of war crimes during the Bangladesh war.

==== International reactions ====
Pakistan - In a statement from Pakistan Foreign Ministry said after the execution, "We have noted with deep concern and anguish the unfortunate executions of the Bangladesh National Party Leader, Mr Salauddin Quadir Chowdhury, and Mr Ali Ahsan Mojaheed. Pakistan is deeply disturbed at this development."

== See also ==
- Char Bhadrasan massacre
- List of Bangladeshi criminals
