= Pierre Cayol =

French contemporary painter

Pierre Cayol (born August 14, 1939) is a French contemporary painter.

== Biography ==
Cayol was born in Salon-de-Provence, Bouches-du-Rhône. He studied art in Grenoble and Paris at the Academy Jullian. He has lived in Tavel (Gard) since 1968.

== Career ==
=== Influences ===
His encounter in 1956 with Marcel Féguide in Eygalières had a decisive influence on his career. His friendship with Baboulène since 1975 has given him the certainty that this is a course to be pursued, Michel Rodde has encouraged him too.

Very interested in the Native American peoples, he has travelled there several times in the Southwest and particularly in New Mexico and Arizona. His interest led to him organising an exhibition in Avignon at the town library. He showed artifacts, arts and crafts; and contemporary paintings by an Apache artist living in San-Carlos Apache Reservation.

=== Exhibitions ===
- "Bilan de l'art contemporain" in Québec, Dallas, New York City.
- With the French artist salon, be exhibited in Peking and Canton.
- The cities of Avignon, Tavel, Saint-Laurent-des-Arbres, Valréas have bought paintings
- The museums of Bagnols-sur-Cèze, Sedan, Uzès, Toulon, Salon-de-Provence, Châteauneuf-le-Rouge.
- There was a show of his works at Château de Lascours, during the days of Poetry in May 1989.

Since 1965, he has had over twenty personal exhibitions: Arles, Bollène, Montélimar, Bagnols-sur-Cèze, Toulon, Villefranchesur-Saône, Castillon du Gard, Nîmes, Uzès, Apt, Aix-en-Provence, Gallery Drouant in Paris, Avignon, Marseille, Béziers (France), Toronto (Canada), Solothurn and Charmney (Switzerland), Seoul (South Korea), Sarasota (Florida - USA).

=== Affiliations ===
A member of the association "Contacts" in the seventies, he is a founding member of "QUICHUA" which organised thematic exhibitions. He participated in the festival of Avignon and Toulon. He has been a full member of Autumn Salon of Paris since 1984.

=== Literature ===
Pierre Cayol illustrated poems by Marc Alyn, Jeannine Baude, Yves Berger, Jehan Despert, Micheline Dupray, Pierre Estellon, Jules Laforgue, Pierre Louys, Jean-Louis Meunier, Frank Ricci, Arthur Rimbaud, Jean Rousselot.

=== Awards ===
Cayol was prize winner in 1985 of the "Contemporary Painting" Ito-Ham in Paris.
