= International Crimes Tribunal (Bangladesh) =

Domestic war crimes tribunal

- আন্তর্জাতিক অপরাধ ট্রাইব্যুনাল (বাংলাদেশ)

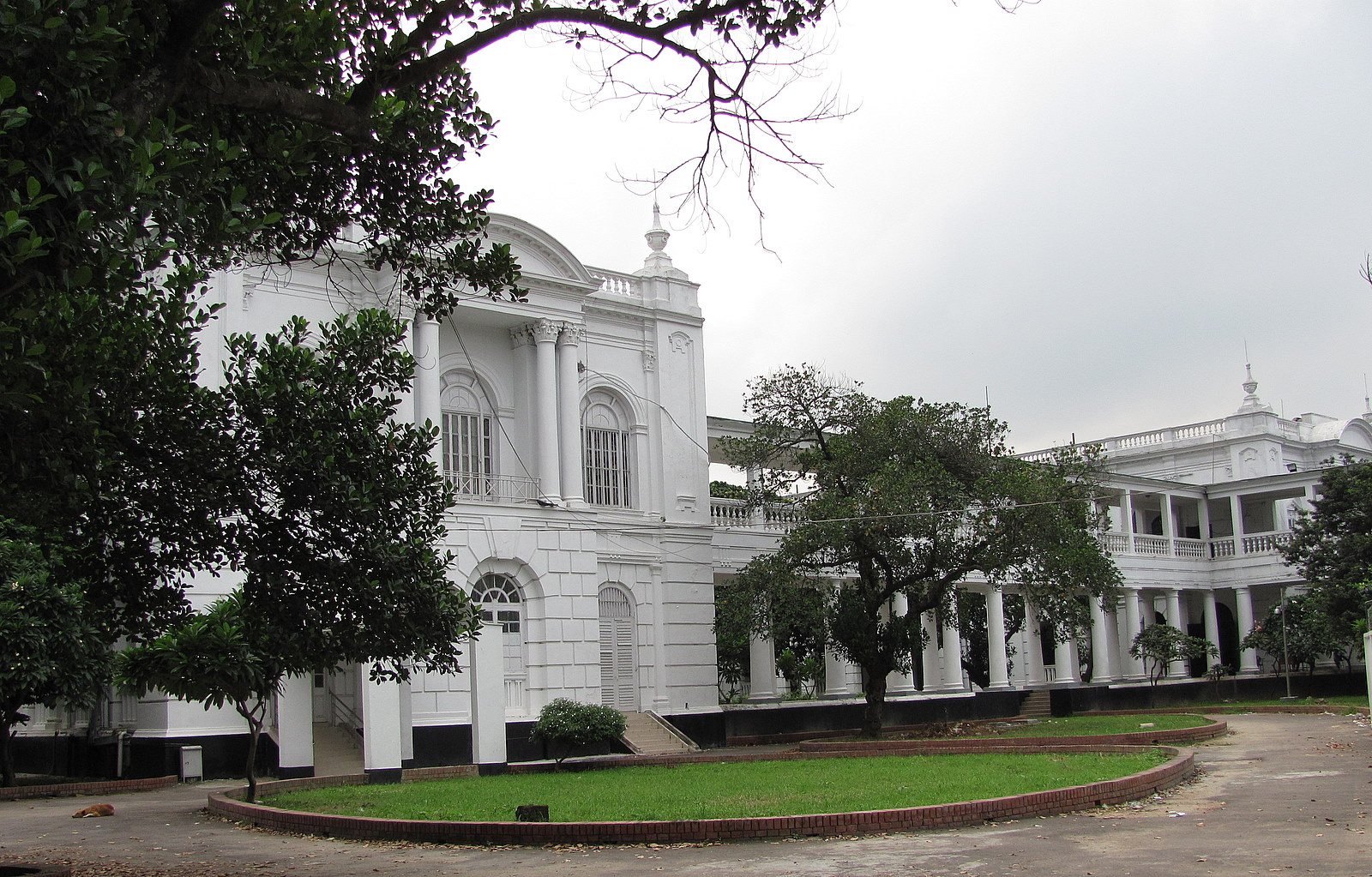
- Old High Court Building in Dhaka where the tribunal takes place
- Interactive map of International Crimes Tribunal (Bangladesh)
- 23.7293°N 90.4023°E
- Established: Tribunal-1: 25 March 2010 (functioning); Tribunal-2: 22 March 2012 (functioning)
- Jurisdiction: Bangladesh
- Location: Old High Court Building, Dhaka, Bangladesh
- Coordinates: 23.7293°N 90.4023°E
- Composition method: Domestic tribunal for crimes against humanity
- Authorised by: International Crimes (Tribunals) Act, 1973
- Appeals to: Appellate Division, Supreme Court of Bangladesh
- Number of positions: 3 (Tribunal-1); 3 (Tribunal-2)
- Annual budget: Confidential
- Language: Bengali and English
- Type of tribunal: Ad hoc criminal tribunal

Chairman
- Currently: Golam Mortuza Mozumder (Tribunal-1); Nazrul Islam Chowdhury (Tribunal-2)

Chief Prosecutor
- Currently: Md Aminul Islam

The International Crimes Tribunal (Bangladesh), abbreviated as ICT (Bangladesh), is a domestic war crimes tribunal in Bangladesh set up in 2009 to investigate and prosecute suspects for the genocide committed in 1971 by the Pakistan Army and their local collaborators the Razakars, Al-Badr and Al-Shams during the Bangladesh Liberation War. During the 2008 general election, the Awami League (AL) pledged to try war criminals. The government set up the tribunal after the Awami League won the general election in December 2008 with a more than two-thirds majority in parliament.

The War Crimes Fact Finding Committee, tasked to investigate and find evidence, completed its report in 2008, identifying 1,600 suspects. Prior to the formation of the ICT, the United Nations Development Programme offered assistance in 2009 on the tribunal's formation. In 2009, the parliament amended the 1973 act that authorised such a tribunal to update it. The first indictments were issued in 2010. However, the main perpetrators of the war crimes, the Pakistan soldiers, remained out of the reach of the courts.

By 2012, nine leaders of Jamaat-e-Islami, the largest Islamist party in the nation, and two of the Bangladesh Nationalist Party, had been indicted as suspects in war crimes. Three leaders of Jamaat were the first tried; each were convicted of several charges of war crimes. The first person convicted was Abul Kalam Azad, tried in absentia as he had left the country; he was sentenced to death in January 2013.

The ICT initially received some offers of international assistance. In 2009, the UN offered its expertise, expressing an interest in helping Bangladesh avoid the problems other countries faced in similar trials. The European Union has passed three resolutions supporting the trials and Jean Lambert has said "she expected that the trial would conform to the highest standard possible."

However, since the beginning of the trials, several human rights organisations and international legal figures have raised objections to the court proceedings. Human Rights Watch, which initially supported the establishment of the tribunal, have criticised it for issues of fairness and transparency, as well as reported harassment of lawyers and witnesses representing the accused. Bianca Karim and Tirza Theunissen have written that the international community have voiced concerns that the trial will not be transparent or impartial.

Jamaat-e-Islami supporters and their student wing, Bangladesh Islami Chhatra Shibir, called a general strike nationwide on 4 December 2012, which erupted in violence. The group demanded the tribunal be scrapped permanently and their leaders be released immediately.

Annual public opinion polls regularly rank the war-crimes trials ranked among the top three "positive steps that the government has taken", though the issue is not considered among the top ten most pressing issues facing the country. Polling in 2013 by AC Nielsen found that more than two-thirds of Bangladeshis characterise the ICT as "unfair" or "very unfair", though 86% support its implementation.

In February 2013, Abdul Quader Molla, Assistant Secretary General of Jamaat, was the first person sentenced to death by the ICT who was not convicted in absentia. Initially, Molla was sentenced to life imprisonment, but demonstrations, including the 2013 Shahbag protests in Dhaka, led to a new punishment. Following Sheikh Hasina's resignation as Prime Minister, the newly formed interim government of Bangladesh reconstituted the tribunal in 2024, appointing six judges to Tribunal-1 and Tribunal-2 to prosecute those identified as masterminds of the July massacre.

The tribunal subsequently faced criticism over alleged human rights violations and concerns of politicisation.

== Background ==
The events of the nine-month conflict of the Bangladesh Liberation War are widely viewed as genocide; the Pakistan Army and collaborators targeted masses of people, intellectuals and members of the political opposition for attacks. Historians have estimated that, during the conflict, between two hundred thousand and four hundred thousand women and children were raped leading to an estimated 25,000 war babies being born. Estimates of persons killed during the conflict range to three million. An estimated ten million refugees entered India, a situation which contributed to its government's decision to intervene militarily in the civil war. Thirty million people were displaced.

In 2009 Shafique Ahmed, the Minister of Law, Justice and Parliamentary Affairs, announced that the trials would be organised under the International Crimes (Tribunal) Act 1973. This act authorises prosecution only of persons living within Bangladesh who were members of the armed forces, including paramilitary groups. The act was amended in 2009 to update it, and the International Crimes Tribunal Rules of Procedure and Evidence were put in place by 2010. Some critics maintain that further amendments are needed to bring the act up to the standards of international law.

== Formation of the tribunal ==
Seeing the broad support for war crimes trials, the Awami League-led fourteen-party alliance included this in their election platform. The Four-Party Alliance, including the BNP and Jamaat-e-Islami, had several alleged war criminals among their top-ranking politicians.

The former freedom fighters and sector commanders of the liberation war pleaded with citizens against voting for the alleged war criminals. The fourteen-party alliance won the election on 29 December 2008, with an overwhelming majority, a "historic landslide". This was thought to be due to their commitment to prosecute war crimes. On 29 January 2009, Mahmud-us-Samad Chowdhury, a member of the parliament (MP) from the Awami League (AL), proposed taking action to establish a tribunal to prosecute war crimes during a session of the Jatiyo Sangshad. A resolution was passed unanimously calling on the government to proceed as promised in the election.

In 1973 the newly independent government of Bangladesh passed a law, the International Crimes (Tribunals) Act (ICT Act 1973), to authorise the investigation and prosecution of the persons responsible for genocide, crimes against humanity, war crimes and other crimes under international law committed in 1971. The act was "a complete law in itself".

On 25 March 2009 the government voted to try the war criminals according to the ICT Act of 1973 but planned amendments to bring the law up to date and in keeping with international standards for similar trials. As a part of the amendment procedure, the government sent the act to the Law Commission, where it was scrutinised by specialist lawyers, judges and professors of the universities. On 9 July 2009, Parliament amended the act as recommended by the commission.

The amendments provided that a political party that had worked against the liberation of Bangladesh could be tried on the same charges as individuals. They also authorised the government to file appeals with the Appellate Division if the tribunal ruled for acquittal for a suspect. The International Bar Association has stated that the "1973 Legislation, together with the 2009 amending text, provides a system which is broadly compatible with current international standards."

On 25 March 2010, the government announced the formation of the following: a three-member judges' tribunal, a seven-member investigation agency, and a twelve-member prosecution team to hold the trials according to the ICT Act of 1973. This landmark announcement was made on the 39th anniversary of the Operation Searchlight massacre by the Pakistan Army on 25 March 1971.

The three judges appointed were Mohammed Nizamul Huq as chairman, with A.T.M. Fazle Kabir and A.K.M. Zahir Ahmed.

Persons appointed to the investigative agency to assist state prosecutors were Abdul Matin, Abdur Rahim, Kutubur Rahman, ASM Shamsul Arefin, Mir Shahidul Islam, Nurul Islam and M. Abdur Razzak Khan.

Golam Arif Tipu was named as Chief Prosecutor. The others are A.K.M. Saiful Islam, Syed Rezaur Rahman, Golam Hasnayen, Rana Das Gupta, Zahirul Huq, Nurul Islam Sujan, Syed Haider Ali, Khandaker Abdul Mannan, Mosharraf Hossain Kajal, Zead Al-Malum, Sanjida Khanom, and Sultan Mahmud Semon.

== Indictments ==
The first nearly dozen men indicted include nine leaders of Jamaat-e-Islami, the largest Islamist party in the nation, which was opposed to independence in 1971: Ghulam Azam, in 1971 chief of the erstwhile East Pakistan unit of the party; incumbent chief Matiur Rahman Nizami; deputy Delwar Hossain Sayeedi; secretary general Ali Ahsan Mohammad Mojahid; assistant secretaries general Muhammad Kamaruzzaman and Abdul Quader Molla; media doyen Mir Kashem Ali, who heads the pro-Jamaat Diganta Media Corporation; Miah Golam Parwar; and Abul Kalam Azad, an Islamic cleric formerly associated with the party.

Two leaders of the opposition Bangladesh Nationalist Party were also indicted: former government ministers Salahuddin Quader Chowdhury and Abdul Alim.

== Accused and verdicts ==
=== Abul Kalam Azad ===
Abul Kalam Azad, a nationally known Islamic cleric and former member of Jamaat, was charged with genocide, rape, abduction, confinement and torture. He was tried in absentia after having fled the country; the police believe he is in Pakistan. In January 2013 Azad was the first suspect to be convicted in the trials; he was found guilty of seven of eight charges and sentenced to death by hanging. Azad's defence lawyer, a prominent Supreme Court lawyer appointed by the state, did not have any witnesses in the case; he said Azad's family failed to co-operate in helping locate witnesses and refused to testify.

United Nations human rights experts expressed concern that the trial did not meet all the criteria of a fair trial and due process. Speaking for the British government, Sayeeda Warsi said of the verdict, "The British government supports the efforts of Bangladesh to bring to justice those responsible for committing atrocities during the 1971 War, although we remain strongly opposed to the application of the death penalty in all circumstances." The French Ambassador to Bangladesh, Michel Trinquier, and the German Ambassador Albrecht Conze each said that individual nations must find their own ways to deal with past events. The US state department has said, "The United States supports bringing to justice those who commit such crimes. However, we believe that any such trials must be free, fair, and transparent, and in accordance with domestic standards and international standards Bangladesh has agreed to uphold through its ratification of international agreements, including the International Covenant on Civil and Political Rights."

=== Abdul Quader Mollah ===
On 5 February 2013, the ICT sentenced Abdul Quader Mollah, assistant secretary of Jamaat, to life imprisonment. Mollah was convicted on five of six counts of crimes against humanity and war crimes. He was accused of shooting 344 people and the rape of an 11-year-old girl. In protest of the trials which it said were politically motivated, Jamaat members called a general strike in Dhaka that erupted in violence.

Following the verdict, large-scale, non-violent protests started on 5 February 2013 in Dhaka, with demonstrators calling for the death penalty for Mollah and any others convicted of war crimes. Tens of thousands of people filled the Shahbag intersection, with more coming in the days following. The protest spread to other parts of the country, with sit-ins and demonstrations taking place in Chittagong, Sylhet, Barisal, Mymensingh, Khulna, Rajbari, Rajshahi, Rangpur, Sunamganj, Noakhali and Narsingdi. Following these mass protests, in September 2013 the Supreme Court overturned his life sentence and imposed the death penalty.

Quader Molla was executed on 12 December 2013 at 22:01 in a Dhaka jail, the first person to be put to death for events in 1971. The JEI called it a "political killing." He was later buried in his village of Faridpur.

=== Delwar Hossain Sayeedi ===
On 28 February 2013, Delwar Hossain Sayeedi, the deputy of Jamaat, was found guilty of genocide, rape and religious persecution. He was sentenced to death by hanging. His defence lawyer had earlier complained that a witness who was supposed to testify for him was abducted from the gates of the courthouse on 5 November 2012, reportedly by police, and has not been heard from since. The government did not seem to take the issue seriously after the prosecution denied there was a problem. By afternoon on the day of the protest, violence had erupted across Bangladesh between Islamic activists and police forces. By the end of 3 March 2013, almost 80 people were dead, including many police officers. An estimated 2000 people were injured countrywide. On 17 September 2014, the Appellate Division of the Bangladesh Supreme Court reduced sentence of Delwar Hossain Sayedee revising the death sentence to 'imprisonment till death' for crimes against humanity in 1971. He died in his cell due to heart failure on 14 August 2023.

=== Muhammad Kamaruzzaman ===
Muhammad Kamaruzzaman was indicted on 7 June 2012 on 7 counts of crimes against humanity. On 9 May 2013 he was convicted and given the death penalty on five counts of mass killings, rape, torture and kidnapping. He was hanged on 11 April 2015.

=== Chowdhury Mueen-Uddin ===
On 3 November 2013, the International Crimes Tribunal sentenced Chowdhury Mueen-Uddin to death after the tribunal found him guilty of torture and murder of 18 intellectuals during 1971 Liberation war of Bangladesh.

=== Ghulam Azam ===
Ghulam Azam was found guilty by the ICT on five counts. Incitement, conspiracy, planning, abetment and failure to prevent murder. He was sentenced on 15 July 2013 to 90 years imprisonment. The tribunal spared Azam from execution due to his old age. He died of a stroke on 23 October 2014 at BSMMU.

=== Ali Ahsan Mojaheed ===
Ali Ahsan Mohammad Mojaheed was sentenced to death by hanging on 17 July 2013 and hanged on 22 November 2015.

=== Salahuddin Quader Chowdhury ===
Salahuddin Quader Chowdhury was sentenced to death by hanging on 1 October 2013 and hanged on 22 November 2015.

=== AKM Yusuf ===
On 2 February 2014, Jamaat-e-Islami leader AKM Yusuf, who was also on trial for crimes against humanity, died in prison. Yusuf was alleged to be the founder of infamous Peace Committees and Razakar force in the greater Khulna region. He was indicted on 13 charges of genocide and crimes against humanity during the Liberation War in 1971.

=== Motiur Rahman Nizami ===
On 29 October 2014, Motiur Rahman Nizami was sentenced to death for war crimes committed during the 1971 independence war against Pakistan. He was executed by hanging from the gallows in Old Dhaka Central Jail on 11 May 2016.

=== Mir Quasem Ali ===
On 2 November 2014, Jamaat-e-Islami politician Mir Quasem Ali was sentenced to death for crimes against humanity committed during the Liberation War of Bangladesh in 1971. He was hanged on 3 September 2016.

=== Sheikh Hasina ===
In July 2025, former Prime Minister of Bangladesh Sheikh Hasina was charged by the International Crimes Tribunal of Bangladesh for crimes against humanity during mass protests in July and August 2024, which has estimates of thousands of deaths. A trial occurred in her absence and in November 2025, she was found guilty and sentenced to death.

== Criticism and controversies ==
=== Concerns for human rights ===
The tribunal has been criticised by observers in Bangladesh and overseas as being biased and problematic, and "lacking basic standards." Brad Adams, director of the Asia branch of Human Rights Watch, said in November 2012: "The trials against the alleged war criminals are deeply problematic, riddled with questions about the independence and impartiality of the judges and fairness of the process. In its November 2012 report, Human Rights Watch found that "glaring violations of fair trial standards" became apparent during 2012 but noted that changes were made in June 2012 which improved the process. Adams said, "If the Bangladeshi government wants these trials to be taken seriously it must ensure that the rights of the accused are fully respected. That means making sure that lawyers and witnesses don't face threats or coercion. Toby Cadman, an international law expert who is an advisor to the Jamaat leaders has been highly critical of the ICT, saying of the international community, "Expressing concern will not be enough. The international community should take quick action to stop the injustice being committed against Jamaat leaders,"

In January 2013, Brad Adams of Human Rights Watch (HRW) noted concern about Shukho Ranjan Bali, who had first appeared as a witness for the prosecution in the Delwar Hossain Sayeedi case. The defence said he was due to give additional evidence in their favour on 5 November 2012. That day Bali was stopped before entering the courthouse by several police officers; witnesses said he was taken away in a white police van. HRW criticised the Bangladeshi government for not working to find him and for its lack of adequate response to allegations criticising the tribunal. The attorney general rejected the abduction claim as a fabrication by the defence to bring the tribunal into disrepute. In May 2013, Bali was found in an Indian prison, and he alleged state abduction and that officials told him that both he and Sayeedi would be killed.

In March 2013, The Economist criticised the tribunal, mentioning government interference, restrictions on public discussion, not enough time allocated for the defence, the kidnapping of a defence witness and the judge resigning due to controversy over his neutrality.

=== 2012 Skype controversy ===
In December 2012, The Economist published contents of leaked communications between the chief justice of the tribunal, Mohammed Nizamul Huq, and Ahmed Ziauddin, a Bangladeshi attorney in Brussels who specialises in international law and is director of the Bangladesh Centre for Genocide Studies. Huq issued an order for The Economist bureau chief and Asia specialist to appear before the tribunal to explain how they got the materials. The Economist said in response, "We did not solicit the material, nor pay for it, nor commit ourselves to publish it". After the leaked communication was published in a local daily, Huq resigned from the tribunal. He had been revealed to have had "prohibited contact" with the "prosecution, government officials, and an external adviser."

According to The Wall Street Journal (WSJ), the e-mails and Skype calls showed that Ziauddin was playing an important part in the proceedings, although he had no legal standing. The WSJ also said that the communications suggested that the Bangladeshi government was trying to secure a quick verdict, as Huq referred to pressure from a government official.

Human Rights Watch and defence lawyers acting for the suspects, Ghulam Azam and Delawar Hossain Sayeedi, requested retrials for the two because of the controversy during their trials. Mahbubey Alam, the Attorney General, suggested that the hacking was an attempt to disrupt the trial. Sheikh Hasina, the Prime Minister of Bangladesh, said the trials would continue regardless of this incident and Huq's resignation. Fazle Kabir was appointed as chair of the ICT. Brad Adams of Human Rights Watch expressed concern that, because of changes among all the judges in the course of the trial, none of the three judges in Sayeedi's case would have heard the entirety of the testimony before reaching a verdict.

=== Allegations by the government ===
Shafique Ahmed, the Minister of Law and Justice, referring to Ziauddin, said that Huq "sought help on procedural matters from an expert. That's not illegal or uncommon." Amnesty International criticised the arrest of Mahmudur Rahman, who had published the hacked files in the daily Amar Desh. The government obtained a court order that accused Rahman of sedition; but Amnesty said that his newspaper stopped publishing the story once the government ban came into effect on 13 December.

Shafique Ahmed alleged that Jamaat-e-Islami has paid US$25 million to lobbyists in the USA and the UK to influence public opinion against the trials. Mizanur Rahman, chair of the National Human Rights Commission, complained about the lobbying efforts, saying there was misinformation being spread among western nations about the war crimes tribunal.

=== Shibir protests ===
Shibir, the student wing of Jamaat, led huge protests against the trials - beginning with a general strike on 4 December 2012; they were attacked by police wherever they wanted to come down to the streets to protest. In one incident in Satkhira, police opened fire on protestors, which resulted in three Shibir workers being injured. In reaction to this, numerous vehicles, including one of the US embassy in Dhaka, were torched and vandalised. In another incident, police fired tear gas and rubber bullets at the activists. One Jamaat-e-Islami activist was killed and scores were injured when police used live ammunition against the protesters during clashes in December 2012. The activists were demanding the release of Miah Golam Parwar, Delawar Hossain Sayedee and other party members being tried.

=== Reactions ===
The UN Human Rights Council expressed deep concern over the death sentence handed down by the Bangladesh International Crimes Tribunal against two opposition leaders in Bangladesh, including Motiur Rahman Nizami, noting the court's practices have not met international standards of fair trial and due process.

Turkey also withdrew its ambassador from Dhaka in protest of the execution of Matiur Rahman Nizami, and Turkish President Recep Tayyip Erdoğan strongly condemned the execution. A top Turkish diplomat called the execution a "huge mistake" by Bangladesh.

Amnesty International has strongly criticized the International Crimes Tribunal of Bangladesh. And said that the tribunal is not fully following international standards. Amnesty International also says there have been many flaws in the trial from the beginning, some of which have been corrected, but many problems remain, To ensure international standards, as well as the victims those who are being tried must also consider human rights and justice.

Human Rights Watch initially supported the establishment of the tribunal and recommended amendments to the 1973 law. The government already had planned to update the law, and proceeded in consultation with experts, as noted above.

When the tribunal was being planned, Stephen Rapp, the United States Ambassador-at-Large for War Crimes Issues, said that the "US government will help Bangladesh hold an open and transparent war crimes trial with the rights of defense for the accused." Kristine A. Huskey, writing for the NGO Crimes of War, said Rapp gave a ten-page letter to the prosecution which included recommendations and various concerns.

A leaked diplomatic cable in November 2010 from the US State Department said, "There is little doubt that hard-line elements within the ruling party Awami League believe that the time is right to crush Bangladesh Jamaat-e-Islami and other Islamic parties."

Bangladeshi opposition political parties have demanded the release of those held, claiming the arrests are politically motivated. Shafique Ahmed, the Minister of Law and Justice, disagrees, saying, "No one is being arrested or tried on religious or political grounds."

Steven Kay, a British Queen's Counsel and criminal attorney, has been part of the defence team for Delwar Hossain Sayeedi. He had earlier criticised the authorising legislation and 2009 amendments, saying: "The current system of war crimes trial and its law in Bangladesh does not include international concerns, required to ensure a fair, impartial and transparent trial." The ICT accused him of violating the British bar's code of conduct.

The Turkish president Abdullah Gül sent a letter to the tribunal asking that clemency be shown to those accused of war crimes. The European Parliament has passed three resolutions supporting the trials, though in at least one, it expressed its "strong opposition against the use of the death penalty in all cases and under any circumstances and its call on the Bangladesh authorities to commute all death sentences and introduce a moratorium on executions as a first step towards abolition of capital punishment." Jean Lambert welcomed the trials and said she expected them to adhere to international standards. Mizanur Rahman, chair of the National Human Rights Commission, has said the trials do adhere to international law as the "national standards are in compliance with international standards". Sam Zarifi of the International Commission of Jurists expressed concern that the flawed nature of trials conducted at the ICT could deepen the divisions in Bangladeshi society which resulted from the war of 1971, rather than heal them.

The United Nations Working Group on Arbitrary Detention has said that the arbitrary detention of the suspects and refusal by the government to grant bail to them violates Article 9 of the Universal Declaration of Human Rights and Article 9 of the International Covenant on Civil and Political Rights. Shafique Ahmed has responded, "It is not right to think that the accused are being detained without any reason. There are no violations of human rights in the ongoing trial of crimes against humanity, and questions of human rights violation are being raised simply to create confusion."

Some human rights advocates are concerned that the mass rapes and killings of women may not be fully addressed in the prosecutions. Irene Khan, a Bangladeshi human rights activist, has described the government's response to abuses against women in the liberation war as the following:

A conservative Muslim society has preferred to throw a veil of negligence and denial on the issue, allowed those who committed or colluded with gender violence to thrive, and left the women victims to struggle in anonymity and shame and without much state or community support.

The Bangladeshi government has dismissed criticisms of the legal provisions and fairness of the tribunal. Shafique Ahmed, the Minister of Law and Justice, said:

There is no scope for questioning the fairness and standard of the ongoing trial for war crimes during the Liberation War in 1971.

== Chief Prosecutors ==
Flag of the Chief Prosecutor of ICT.

No.	Portrait	Officeholder	Term in office		
No.	Portrait	Officeholder	Assumed office	Left office	Time in office
1		Ghulam Arieff Tipoo (1931-2024)	25 March 2010	15 March 2024	13 years, 356 days
2		Mohammad Tajul Islam (b. 1973)	7 September 2024	23 February 2026	2 years, 72 days
3		Md Aminul Islam	23 February 2026	Incumbent	268 days
