= Bangladesh Liberation War =

1971 Bangladesh–Pakistan armed conflict

- Part of the independence of Bangladesh, the Indo-Pakistani conflicts, and the Cold War
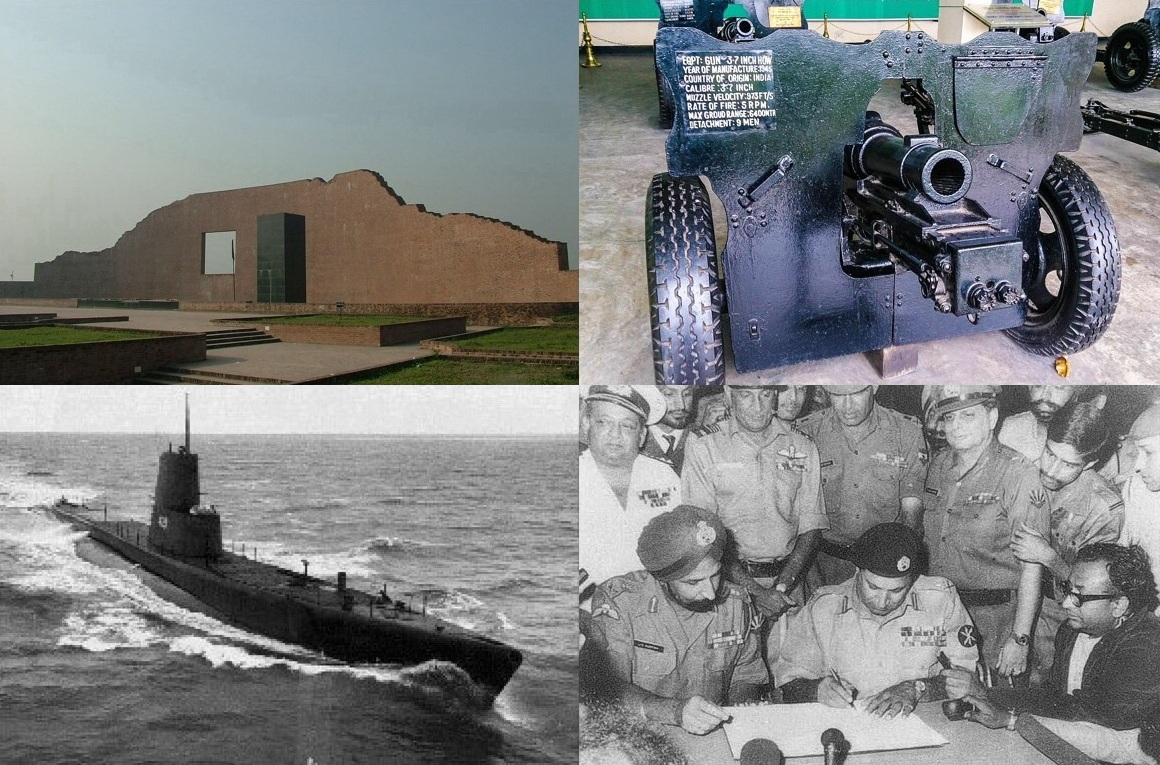
- Clockwise from top left: Martyred Intellectuals Memorial; Bangladesh Forces howitzer; A. A. K. Niazi signs the Pakistani Instrument of Surrender to the joint forces in the presence of Jagjit Singh Aurora; and the PNS Ghazi
Date	26 March – 16 December 1971; (8 months, 2 weeks and 6 days)
Location	East Pakistan (present-day Bangladesh) Spillovers: Eastern Front: India–East Pakistan border; India–East Pakistan enclaves; parts of East and Northeast India; Bay of Bengal; Western Front: India–West Pakistan border; Line of Control (Kashmir); Zero Point; Arabian Sea
Result	Bangladeshi-Indian victory: Surrender of Pakistani forces; Independence of Bangladesh; Military Officer's Revolt in Pakistan
Territorial changes	East Pakistan secedes from Pakistan as the People's Republic of Bangladesh

Belligerents
Bangladesh; India (after 3 Dec)	Pakistan

Commanders and leaders
Political: (Provisional Government of Bangladesh) Sheikh Mujibur Rahman; (Provisional Government of Bangladesh) Syed Nazrul Islam; (Provisional Government of Bangladesh) Tajuddin Ahmad; (India) Indira Gandhi; Military: (Provisional Government of Bangladesh) M. A. G. Osmani; (Provisional Government of Bangladesh) M. A. Rab; (Provisional Government of Bangladesh) A. K. Khandker; (Provisional Government of Bangladesh) Ziaur Rahman; (Provisional Government of Bangladesh) K. M. Shafiullah; (Provisional Government of Bangladesh) Khaled Mosharraf; Sam Manekshaw; (India) Jagjit Singh Aurora	Political: Yahya Khan; Tikka Khan; Nurul Amin; Abdul Motaleb Malik; Tridev Roy; Military: Abdul Hamid Khan; A. A. K. Niazi; Rao Farman Ali; Khadim Hussain Raja; Militias: Ghulam Azam; Syed Khwaja Khairuddin; Motiur Rahman Nizami (executed); Fazlul Chaudhry (POW)

Units involved
Mukti Bahini; Indian Armed Forces	Pakistan Armed Forces Paramilitary and militias: Jamaat-e-Islami Pakistan; East Pakistan Central Peace Committee; East Pakistan Civil Armed Force; Razakars; Al-Badr; Al-Shams; Mujahid Bahini; Pakistan Democratic Party; Proxies: Mizo Rebels

Strength
(Provisional Government of Bangladesh) 175,000; (India) 250,000	(Pakistan) c. 91,000 regular troops (Note: Cooper and Ali's figures of 365,000 Pakistan Army and 280,000 paramilitary are for the entire Pakistan force, on the west and east fronts combined, when the Indo-Pakistani War of 1971 broke out. Cloughley clarifies that only a quarter of the 365,000 Pakistan Army, roughly 91,000, was in East Pakistan.); 280,000 paramilitary forces; c. 25,000 militiamen

Casualties and losses
(Provisional Government of Bangladesh) c. 30,000 killed; (India) 1,426–1,525 killed; 3,611–4,061 wounded	(Pakistan) 5,866 killed; c. 10,000 wounded; 90,000–93,000 captured (including 79,676 troops and 10,324–12,192 local militiamen)
- Civilian deaths: Estimates range between 300,000 and 3,000,000.

The Bangladesh Liberation War (Note: This war is known as the Liberation War or the War of Independence in Bangladesh. This war is also called the Civil War in Pakistan.) (Bengali: মুক্তিযুদ্ধ, pronounced [mukt̪iɟud̪d̪ʱo]), also known as the Bangladesh War of Independence, was an armed conflict sparked by the rise of the Bengali nationalist and self-determination movement in East Pakistan, which resulted in the independence of Bangladesh with the help of India. The war began when the Pakistani military junta based in West Pakistan—under the orders of Yahya Khan—launched Operation Searchlight against East Pakistanis on the night of 25 March 1971, initiating the Bangladesh genocide.

In response to the violence, members of the Mukti Bahini—a guerrilla resistance movement formed by Bengali military, paramilitary and civilians—launched a mass guerrilla war against the Pakistani military, liberating numerous towns and cities in the war's initial months. At first, the Pakistan Army regained momentum during the monsoon, but Bengali guerrillas counterattacked by carrying out widespread sabotage, including through Operation Jackpot against the Pakistan Navy, while the nascent Bangladesh Air Force flew sorties against Pakistani military bases. India joined the war on 3 December 1971 in support of the Mukti Bahini, after Pakistan launched preemptive air strikes on northern India and massive flight of some 10 million East Pakistani Bengals to the Indian state of West Bengal, following waves of emigration since Partition in 1947. The subsequent Indo-Pakistani War involved fighting on two fronts; with air supremacy achieved in the eastern theater and the rapid advance of the Allied Forces of Mukti Bahini and the Indian military, Pakistan surrendered in Dhaka on 16 December 1971, in what remains to date the largest surrender of armed personnel since the Second World War.

Rural and urban areas across East Pakistan saw extensive military operations and air strikes to suppress the tide of civil disobedience that formed after the 1970 election stalemate. The Pakistan Army, backed by Islamists, created radical religious militias—the Razakars, Al-Badr and Al-Shams—to assist it during raids on the local populace. Members of the Pakistani military and supporting militias engaged in mass murder, deportation and genocidal rape, pursuing a systematic campaign of annihilation against nationalist Bengali civilians, students, intelligentsia, religious minorities and armed personnel. The capital, Dhaka, was the scene of numerous massacres, including the Dhaka University massacre. Sectarian violence also broke out between Bengalis and Urdu-speaking Biharis. An estimated 10 million Bengali refugees fled to neighboring India, while 30 million were internally displaced.

The war changed the geopolitical landscape of South Asia, with the emergence of Bangladesh as the world's seventh-most populous country. Due to complex regional alliances, the war was a major episode in Cold War tensions involving the United States, the Soviet Union and China. The majority of member states in the United Nations recognized Bangladesh as a sovereign nation in 1972.

== Background ==
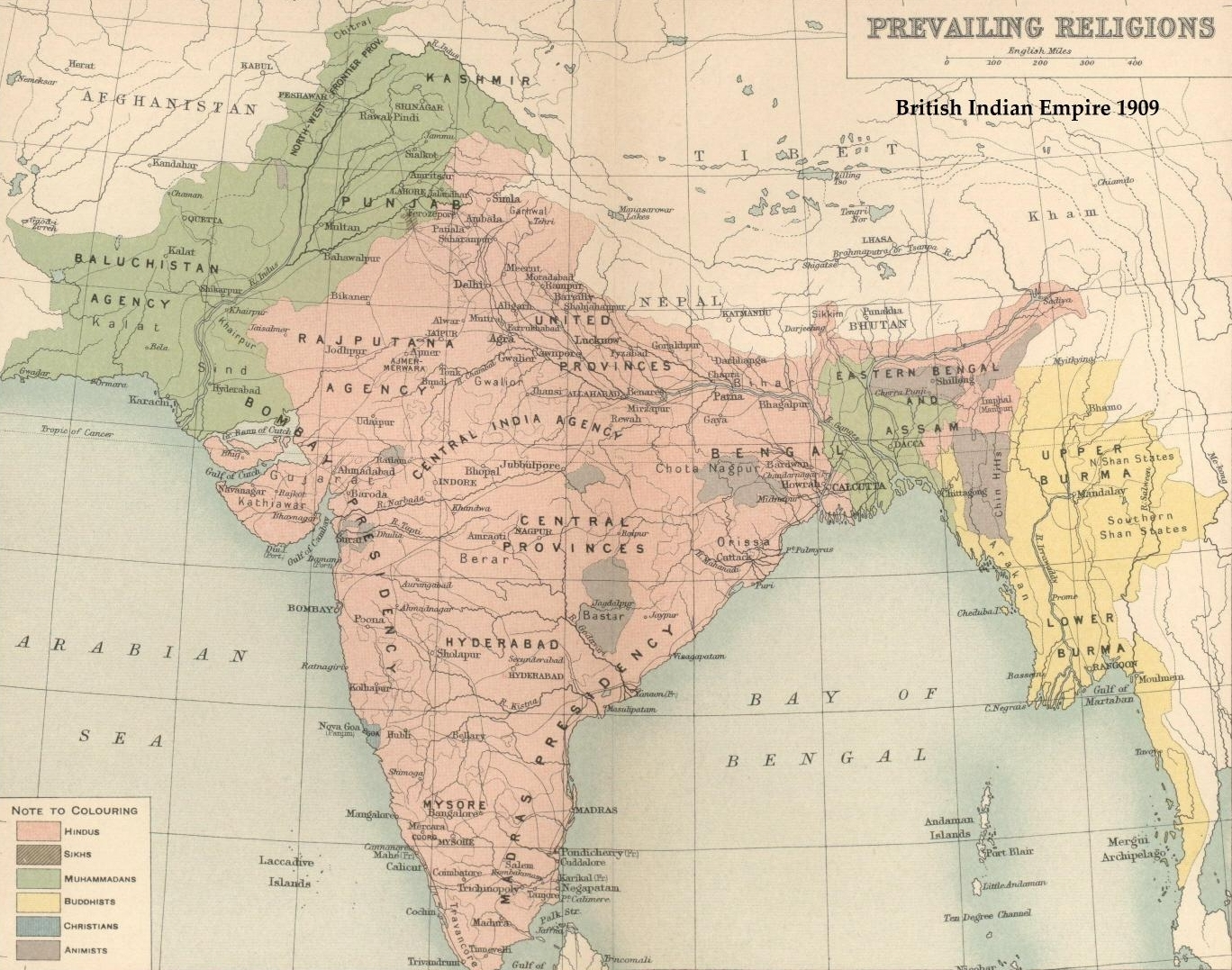
A map of the British Raj in 1909 showing Muslim majority areas in green, including modern-day Bangladesh in the east and Pakistan in the west

Before the Partition of British India, the Lahore Resolution initially envisaged separate Muslim-majority states in British India's eastern and northwestern zones. A proposal for an independent United Bengal was mooted by Prime Minister Huseyn Shaheed Suhrawardy in 1946 but opposed by the colonial authorities. The East Pakistan Renaissance Society advocated the creation of a sovereign state in eastern British India.

Political negotiations led, in August 1947, to the official birth of two states, Pakistan and India, giving presumably permanent homes for Muslims and Hindus, respectively, after the British departed. The Dominion of Pakistan comprised two geographically and culturally separate areas to the east and the west, with India in between.

The western zone was popularly (and, for a period, also officially) termed West Pakistan and the eastern zone (modern-day Bangladesh) was initially termed East Bengal and later East Pakistan. Although the two zones' population was close to equal, political power was concentrated in West Pakistan, and it was widely perceived that East Pakistan was being exploited economically, leading to many grievances. Administration of two non-contiguous territories was also seen as a challenge.

On 25 March 1971, after an election won by an East Pakistani political party (the Awami League) was ignored by the ruling (West Pakistani) establishment, rising political discontent and cultural nationalism in East Pakistan was met by brutal and suppressive force from the ruling elite of the West Pakistan establishment, in what came to be termed Operation Searchlight. The Pakistan Army's violent crackdown led Awami League leader Sheikh Mujibur Rahman to declare independence of East Pakistan as the sovereign state of Bangladesh on 26 March 1971. Most Bengalis supported this move, although some Islamists and Biharis opposed it and sided with the Pakistan Army instead.

Pakistani president Agha Muhammad Yahya Khan ordered the Pakistani military to restore the Pakistani government's authority, beginning the civil war. The war led a substantial number of refugees (estimated at the time to be about 10 million) to flood India's eastern provinces. Facing a mounting humanitarian and economic crisis, India actively aided and organized the Bangladeshi resistance army, the Mukti Bahini.

=== Language controversy ===
In 1948, Governor-General Muhammad Ali Jinnah declared that "Urdu, and only Urdu" would be Pakistan's federal language. But Urdu was historically prevalent only in the north, central, and western subcontinent; in East Bengal, the native language was Bengali, one of the two most easterly branches of the Indo-European languages. Bengali speakers constituted over 56% of Pakistan's population.

The government stand was widely viewed as an attempt to suppress the culture of the eastern wing. The people of East Bengal demanded that their language be given federal status alongside Urdu and English. The Language Movement began in 1948, as civil society protested the removal of Bengali script from currency and stamps, which were in place since the British Raj.

The movement reached its climax in 1952, when on 21 February, the police fired on protesting students and civilians, causing several deaths. The day is revered in Bangladesh as the Language Movement Day. In memory of the deaths, UNESCO declared 21 February International Mother Language Day in November 1999.

=== Disparities ===
Although East Pakistan had the larger population, West Pakistan dominated the divided country politically and received more money from the common budget.

Year	Spending on West Pakistan (in millions of Pakistani rupees)	Spending on East Pakistan (in millions of Pakistani rupees)	Amount spent on East as percentage of West
1950–55	11,290	5,240	46.4
1955–60	16,550	5,240	31.7
1960–65	33,550	14,040	41.8
1965–70	51,950	21,410	41.2
Total	113,340	45,930	40.5
Source: Reports of the Advisory Panels for the Fourth Five Year Plan 1970–75, Vol. I, published by the planning commission of Pakistan.

East Pakistan was already economically disadvantaged at the time of Pakistan's creation yet this economic disparity only increased under Pakistani rule. Factors included not only the deliberate state discrimination in developmental policies but also the fact that the presence of the country's capital and more immigrant businessmen in the Western Wing directed greater government allocations there. Due to low numbers of native businessmen in East Pakistan, substantial labor unrest and a tense political environment, there were also much lower foreign investments in the eastern wing. The Pakistani state's economic outlook was geared towards urban industry, which was not compatible with East Pakistan's mainly agrarian economy.

Also, Bengalis were underrepresented in the Pakistani military. Officers of Bengali origin in the different wings of the armed forces made up just 5% of the overall force by 1965; of these, only a few were in command positions, with the majority in technical or administrative posts. West Pakistanis believed that Bengalis were not "martially inclined", unlike Pashtuns and Punjabis; Bengalis dismissed the "martial races" notion as ridiculous and humiliating.

Moreover, despite huge defense spending, East Pakistan received none of the benefits, such as contracts, purchasing and military support jobs. The Indo-Pakistani War of 1965 over Kashmir also highlighted the sense of military insecurity among Bengalis, as only an under-strength infantry division and 15 combat aircraft without tank support were in East Pakistan to repulse any Indian retaliations during the conflict.

=== Ideological and cultural differences ===
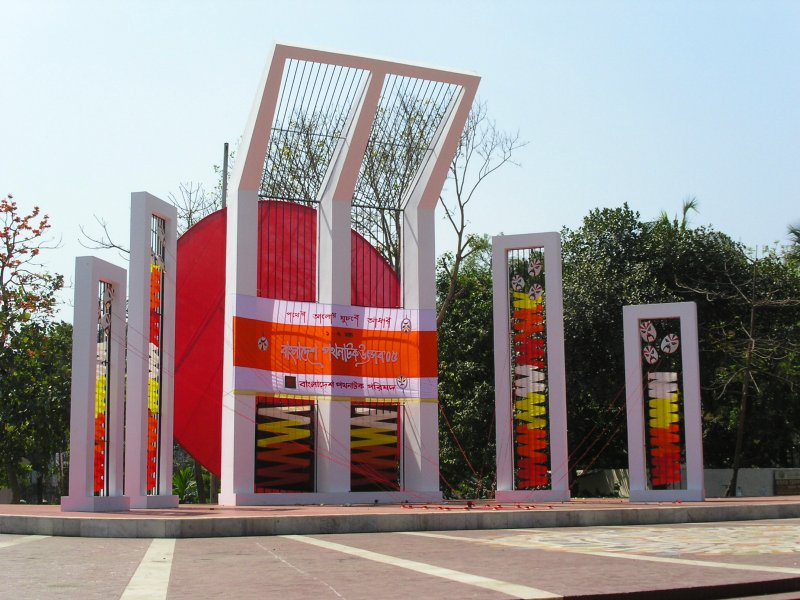
Language movement memorial

In 1947, the Bengali Muslims had identified themselves with Pakistan's Islamic project, but by the 1970s, the people of East Pakistan had given priority to their Bengali ethnicity over their religious identity, desiring a society in accordance with Western principles such as secularism, democracy and socialism. Many Bengali Muslims strongly objected to the Islamist paradigm the Pakistani state imposed.

Most members of West Pakistan's ruling elite shared a vision of a liberal society, but nevertheless viewed a common faith as an essential mobilizing factor behind Pakistan's creation and the subsuming of Pakistan's multiple regional identities into one national identity. West Pakistanis were substantially more supportive than East Pakistanis of an Islamic state, a tendency that persisted after 1971.

Cultural and linguistic differences between the two wings gradually outweighed any sense of religious unity. The Bengalis took great pride in their culture and language which, with its Bengali script and vocabulary, was unacceptable to the West Pakistani elite, who believed that it had assimilated considerable Hindu cultural influences. West Pakistanis, in an attempt to "Islamise" the East, wanted the Bengalis to adopt Urdu. The activities of the language movement nurtured a sentiment among Bengalis in favor of discarding Pakistan's communalism in favor of secular politics. The Awami League began propagating its secular message through its newspaper to the Bengali readership.

The Awami League's emphasis on secularism differentiated it from the Muslim League. In 1971, the Bangladeshi liberation struggle against Pakistan was led by secular leaders and secularists hailed the Bangladeshi victory as the triumph of secular Bengali nationalism over religion-centred Pakistani nationalism. While Pakistan's government strives for an Islamic state, Bangladesh was established secular. After the liberation victory, the Awami League attempted to build a secular order and the pro-Pakistan Islamist parties were barred from political participation. The majority of East Pakistani ulama had either remained neutral or supported the Pakistani state, since they felt that the breakup of Pakistan would be detrimental for Islam.

=== Political differences ===
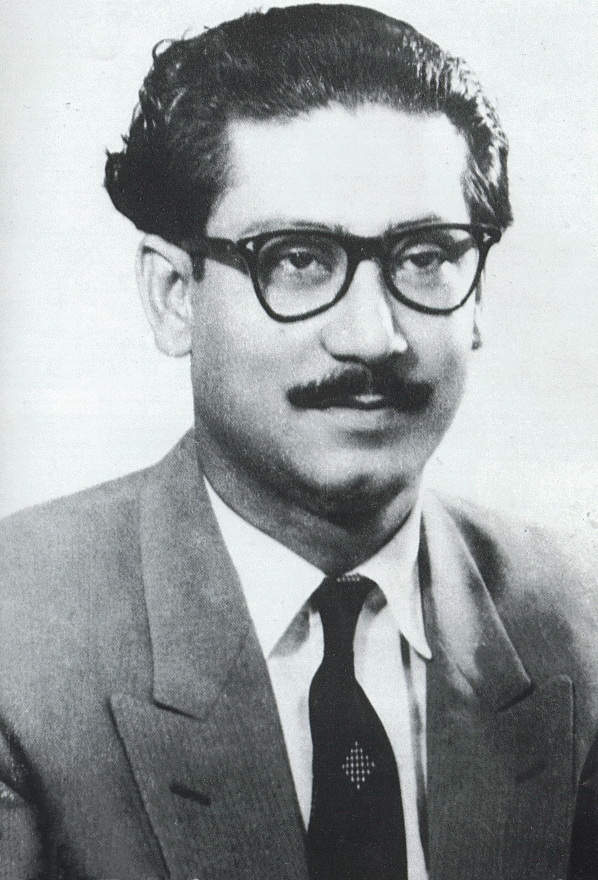
Sheikh Mujibur Rahman, the leader of East Pakistan, and later Bangladesh

Although East Pakistan accounted for a slight majority of the country's population, political power remained in the hands of West Pakistanis. Since a straightforward system of representation based on population would have concentrated political power in East Pakistan, the West Pakistani establishment came up with the "One Unit" scheme, whereby all of West Pakistan was considered one province. This was solely to counterbalance the East wing's votes.

After the 1951 assassination of Liaquat Ali Khan, Pakistan's first prime minister, political power began to devolve to the new position of President of Pakistan, which replaced the office of Governor General when Pakistan became a republic, and, eventually, the military. The nominal elected chief executive, the Prime Minister, was frequently sacked by the establishment, acting through the President.

The East Pakistanis observed that the West Pakistani establishment swiftly deposed any East Pakistanis elected leader of Pakistan, such as Khawaja Nazimuddin, Mohammad Ali Bogra, Huseyn Shaheed Suhrawardy, and Iskander Mirza. Their suspicions were further aggravated by the military dictatorships of Ayub Khan (27 October 1958 – 25 March 1969) and Yahya Khan (25 March 1969 – 20 December 1971), both West Pakistanis. The situation reached a climax in 1970, when the Bangladesh Awami League, the largest East Pakistani political party, led by Sheikh Mujibur Rahman, won a landslide victory in the national elections. The party won 167 of the 169 seats allotted to East Pakistan, and thus a majority of the 313 seats in the National Assembly. This gave the Awami League the constitutional right to form a government. However, Zulfikar Ali Bhutto (a former foreign minister), the leader of the Pakistan People's Party, refused to allow Rahman to become the prime minister of Pakistan.

Instead, he proposed the idea of having two prime ministers, one for each wing. The proposal elicited outrage in the east wing, already chafing under the other constitutional innovation, the "One Unit scheme". Bhutto also refused to accept Rahman's Six Points. On 3 March 1971, the two leaders of the two wings along with the president general Yahya Khan met in Dacca to decide the fate of the country.

After their discussions yielded no satisfactory results, Sheikh Mujibur Rahman called for a nationwide strike. Bhutto feared a civil war, therefore, he sent his trusted companion, Mubashir Hassan. A message was conveyed, and Rahman decided to meet Bhutto. Upon his arrival, Rahman met with Bhutto and both agreed to form a coalition government with Rahman as premier and Bhutto as president, but Sheikh Mujib later ruled out such a possibility. Meanwhile, the military was unaware of these developments, and Bhutto increased his pressure on Rahman to reach a decision.

Between 10 and 13 March, Pakistan International Airlines canceled all its international routes to urgently fly "government passengers" to Dacca. These "government passengers" were almost all Pakistani soldiers in civilian dress. MV Swat, a ship of the Pakistan Navy carrying ammunition and soldiers, was harbored in Chittagong Port, but the Bengali workers and sailors at the port refused to unload the ship. A unit of East Pakistan Rifles refused to obey commands to fire on the Bengali demonstrators, beginning a mutiny among the Bengali soldiers.

=== Response to the 1970 cyclone and Bhashani's role ===
The 1970 Bhola cyclone made landfall on the East Pakistan coastline during the evening of 12 November, around the same time as a local high tide, killing an estimated 300,000 people. A 2017 World Meteorological Organization panel considers it the deadliest tropical cyclone since at least 1873. A week after the landfall, President Khan conceded that his government had made "slips" and "mistakes" in its handling of the relief efforts due to a lack of understanding of the magnitude of the disaster.

A statement released by eleven political leaders in East Pakistan ten days after the cyclone hit charged the government with "gross neglect, callous and utter indifference". They also accused the president of playing down the magnitude of the problem in news coverage. On 19 November, students held a march in Dacca protesting the slowness of the government's response.

Abdul Hamid Khan Bhashani, a prominent politician who previously led multiple rebellions against the British Raj, addressed a rally of 50,000 people on 23 November 1970, where he accused the president of inefficiency and demanded his resignation. He was the first ever Bengali to declare independence of East Pakistan during this rally but it was not officially recognized.

As the conflict between East and West Pakistan developed in March, the Dacca offices of the two government organizations directly involved in relief efforts were closed for at least two weeks, first by a general strike and then by a ban on government work in East Pakistan by the Awami League. With this increase in tension, foreign personnel were evacuated over fears of violence. Relief work continued in the field, but long-term planning was curtailed. This conflict widened into the Bangladesh Liberation War in December and concluded with the creation of Bangladesh.

=== Operation Searchlight ===
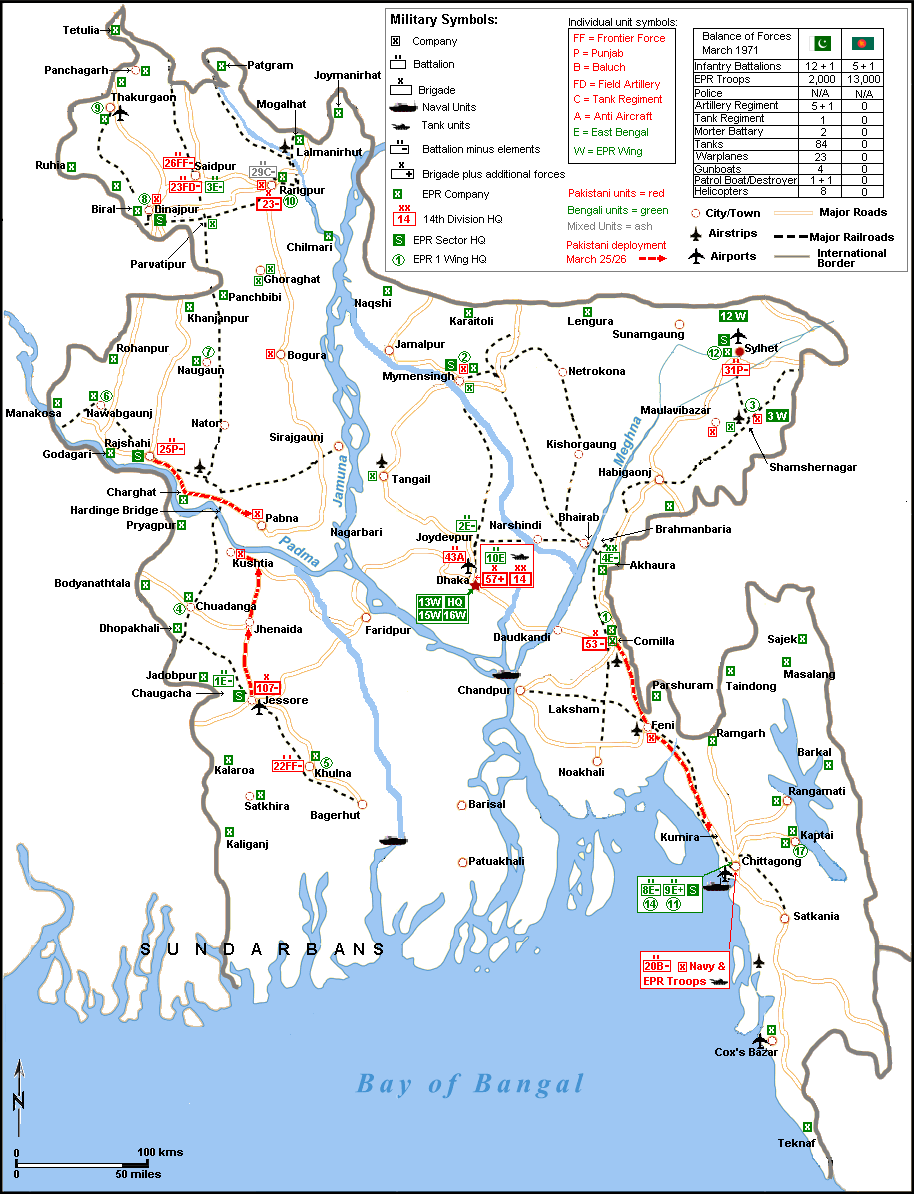
The location of Bengali and Pakistani military units during Operation Searchlight, March 1971

A planned military pacification carried out by the Pakistan Army—codenamed Operation Searchlight—started on 25 March 1971 to curb the Bengali independence movement by taking control of the major cities on 26 March, and then eliminating all opposition, political or military, within one month. The Pakistani state used anti-Bihari violence by Bengalis in early March to justify Operation Searchlight.

Before the beginning of the operation, all foreign journalists were systematically deported from East Pakistan.

The main phase of Operation Searchlight ended with the fall of the last major town in Bengali hands in mid-May. The operation also began the Bangladesh genocide. These systematic killings served only to enrage the Bengalis, resulting in East Pakistan's secession later that year. Bangladeshi media and reference books in English have published casualty figures that vary greatly, from 5,000 to 35,000 in Dacca, and 300,000 to 3,000,000 for Bangladesh as a whole. Independent researchers, including the British Medical Journal, have put forward figures ranging from 125,000 to 505,000. American political scientist Rudolph Rummel puts total deaths at 1.5 million. The atrocities have been called acts of genocide.

According to the Asia Times:

At a meeting of the military top brass, Yahya Khan declared: "Kill 3 million of them and the rest will eat out of our hands". Accordingly, on the night of 25 March, the Pakistani Army launched Operation Searchlight to "crush" Bengali resistance in which Bengali members of military services were disarmed and killed, students and the intelligentsia systematically liquidated and able-bodied Bengali males just picked up and gunned down.

Although the violence focused on the provincial capital, Dacca, it also affected all parts of East Pakistan. Residential halls of the University of Dacca were particularly targeted. The only Hindu residential hall—Jagannath Hall—was destroyed by the Pakistani armed forces, and an estimated 600 to 700 of its residents were murdered. The Pakistani army denied any cold-blooded killings at the university, but the Hamoodur Rahman Commission in Pakistan concluded that overwhelming force was used. This fact, and the massacre at Jagannath Hall and nearby student dormitories of Dacca University, are corroborated by a videotape secretly filmed by Professor Nurul Ula of the East Pakistan University of Engineering and Technology, whose residence was directly opposite the student dormitories.

The scale of the atrocities was first made clear in the West, when Anthony Mascarenhas, a Pakistani journalist who had been sent to the province by the military authorities to write a story favorable to Pakistan, instead fled to the United Kingdom and, on 13 June 1971, published an article in The Sunday Times describing the systematic killings by the military. The BBC wrote: "There is little doubt that Mascarenhas' reportage played its part in ending the war. It helped turn world opinion against Pakistan and encouraged India to play a decisive role", with Indian prime minister Indira Gandhi saying that Mascarenhas' article led her "to prepare the ground for India's armed intervention".

Sheikh Mujibur Rahman was arrested by the Pakistani Army. Yahya Khan appointed Brigadier (later General) Rahimuddin Khan to preside over a special tribunal prosecuting Rahman with multiple charges. The tribunal's sentence was never made public, but Yahya caused the verdict to be held in abeyance in any case. Other Awami League leaders were arrested as well, while a few fled Dacca to avoid arrest. The Awami League was banned by General Yahya Khan.

=== Declaration of independence ===
The violence unleashed by the Pakistani forces on 25 March 1971 proved the last straw to the efforts to negotiate a settlement. Furthermore the Pakistany army arrested Sheikh Mujibur Rahman.

A news of Sheikh Mujibur Rahman's arrest reached the radio station in Chittagong. Major Ziaur Rahman begun rebelling with his forces was requested to provide security for the radio station and also read the Declaration of independence on 26 March 1971. He broadcast the announcement of the declaration of independence on behalf of Sheikh Mujibur Rahman:

This is Swadhin Bangla Betar Kendra. I, Major Ziaur Rahman, at the direction of Bangobondhu Sheikh Mujibur Rahman, hereby declare that Independent People's Republic of Bangladesh has been established. At his direction, I have taken the command as the temporary Head of the Republic. In the name of Sheikh Mujibur Rahman, I call upon all Bengalees to rise against the attack by the West Pakistani Army. We shall fight to the last to free our motherland. Victory is, by the Grace of Allah, ours. Joy Bangla.

The Kalurghat Radio Station's transmission capability was limited, but the message was picked up by a Japanese ship in the Bay of Bengal. It was then re-transmitted by Radio Australia and later by the BBC.

26 March 1971 is considered the official Independence Day of Bangladesh, and the name Bangladesh was in effect henceforth. In July 1971, Indian prime minister Indira Gandhi openly referred to the former East Pakistan as Bangladesh.

== Liberation War ==
=== March–June ===
At first, resistance was spontaneous and disorganized, and was not expected to be prolonged. But when the Pakistani Army cracked down upon the population, resistance grew. The Mukti Bahini became increasingly active. The Pakistani military sought to quell them, but increasingly many Bengali soldiers defected to this underground "Bangladesh army". These Bengali units slowly merged into the Mukti Bahini and bolstered their weaponry with supplies from India. Pakistan responded by airlifting in two infantry divisions and reorganizing their forces. They also raised paramilitary forces of Razakars, Al-Badrs and Al-Shams (mostly members of the Muslim League and other Islamist groups), as well as other Bengalis who opposed independence, and Bihari Muslims who had settled during the time of partition.

On 17 April 1971, a provisional government was formed in Meherpur District in western Bangladesh bordering India with Sheikh Mujibur Rahman, who was in prison in Pakistan, as president, Syed Nazrul Islam as acting president, Tajuddin Ahmad as prime minister, and General Muhammad Ataul Ghani Osmani as commander-in-chief, Bangladesh Forces. As fighting grew between the occupation army and the Bengali Mukti Bahini, an estimated 10 million Bengalis sought refuge in the Indian states of Assam and West Bengal.

=== June–September ===
The eleven sectors during the Bangladesh Liberation War

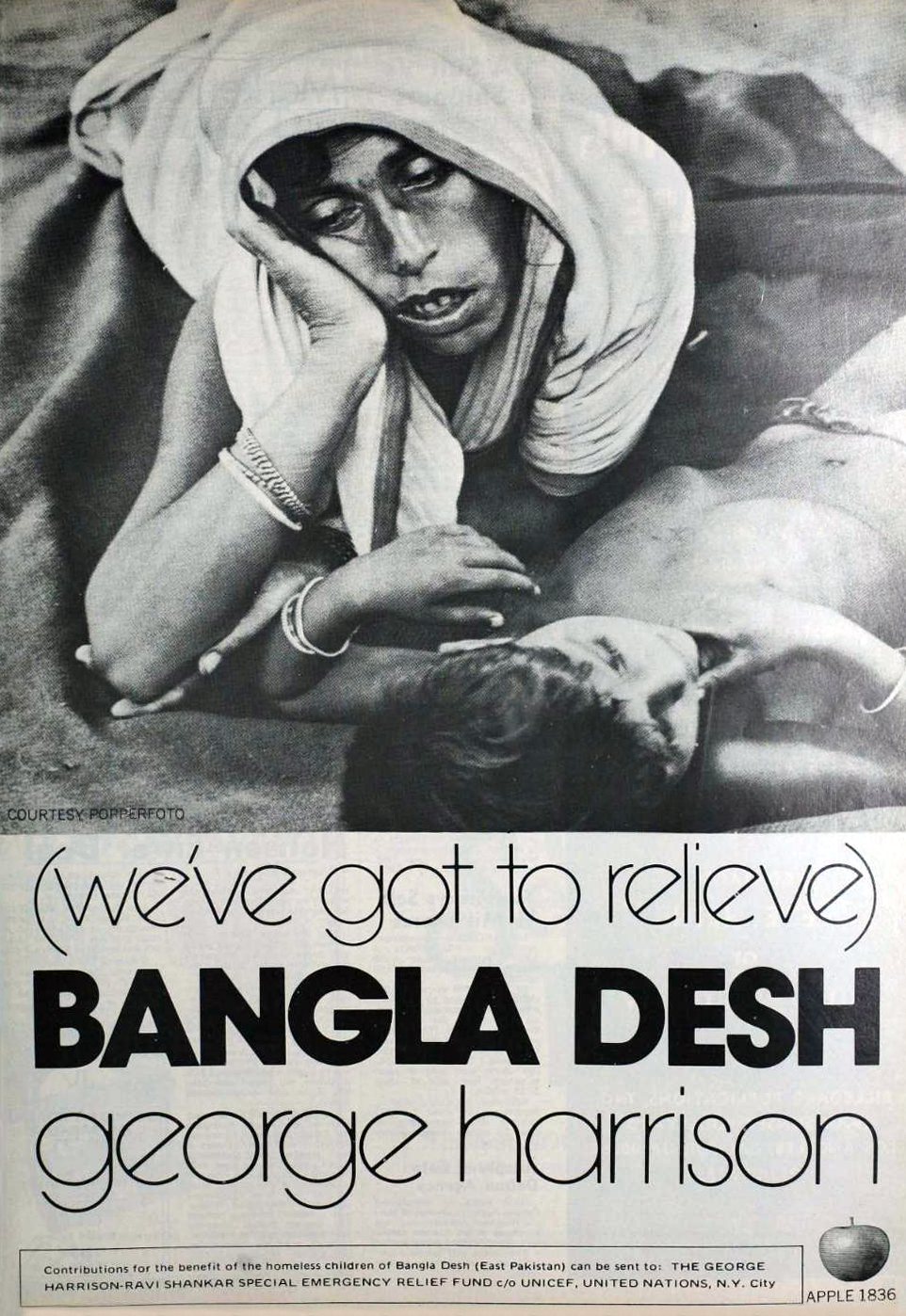
An advertisement for former Beatle George Harrison's "Bangla Desh" single, released in July 1971 to raise international awareness and funds for the millions of Bangladeshi refugees

Bangladesh forces command was set up on 11 July, with Col. M. A. G. Osmani as commander-in-chief (C-in-C) with the status of Cabinet Minister, Lt. Col. Abdur Rabb as chief of Staff (COS), Group Captain A. K. Khandker as Deputy Chief of Staff (DCOS) and Major A. R. Chowdhury as Assistant Chief of Staff (ACOS).

Osmani had differences of opinion with the Indian leadership about the role of the Mukti Bahini in the conflict. Indian leadership initially envisioned a well trained force of 8,000 guerrillas, operating in small cells around Bangladesh to facilitate eventual conventional combat. With the Bangladesh government in exile, Osmani favored a different strategy:

- Bengali conventional forces would occupy lodgments inside Bangladesh and the Bangladesh government would request international diplomatic recognition and intervention. Initially Mymensingh was picked for this operation, but Osmani later settled on Sylhet.
- Sending the maximum number of guerrillas into Bangladesh as soon as possible with the following objectives:
  - Increasing Pakistani casualties through raids and ambush.
  - Cripple economic activity by hitting power stations, railway lines, storage depots and communication networks.
  - Destroy Pakistan Army mobility by blowing up bridges/culverts, fuel depots, trains and river crafts.
  - The strategic objective was to make the Pakistanis spread their forces inside the province, so attacks could be made on isolated Pakistani detachments.

Bangladesh was divided into eleven sectors in July, each with a commander chosen from defected officers of the Pakistani army who joined the Mukti Bahini to lead guerrilla operations. The Mukti Bahini forces were given two to five weeks of training by the Indian army on guerrilla warfare. Most of their training camps were near the border area and operated with assistance from India. The 10th Sector was placed under Osmani's command and included the Naval Commandos and C-in-C's special force. Three brigades (eventually 8 battalions) were raised for conventional warfare; a large guerrilla force (estimated at 100,000) was trained.

Five infantry battalions were reformed and positioned along the northern and eastern borders of Bangladesh. Three more battalions were raised, and artillery batteries were formed. During June and July, Mukti Bahini regrouped across the border with Indian aid through Operation Jackpot and began sending 2,000–5,000 guerrillas across the border, the so-called Monsoon Offensive, which for various reasons (lack of proper training, supply shortage, lack of a proper support network inside Bangladesh) failed to achieve its objectives. Bengali regular forces also attacked border outposts in Mymensingh, Comilla and Sylhet, but the results were mixed. Pakistani authorities concluded that they had successfully contained the Monsoon Offensive, which proved a near-accurate observation.

Guerrilla operations, which slackened during the training phase, picked up after August. Economic and military targets in Dacca were attacked. The major success story was Operation Jackpot, in which naval commandos mined and blew up berthed ships in Chittagong, Mongla, Narayanganj and Chandpur on 15 August 1971.

=== October–December ===
Major battles

- Battle of Boyra
- Battle of Garibpur
- Battle of Dhalai
- Battle of Hilli
- Battle of Kushtia

Bangladeshi conventional forces attacked border outposts. Kamalpur, Belonia and the Battle of Boyra are a few examples. 90 out of 370 border outposts fell to Bengali forces. Guerrilla attacks intensified, as did Pakistani and Razakar reprisals on civilian populations. Pakistani forces were reinforced by eight battalions from West Pakistan. The Bangladeshi independence fighters even managed to temporarily capture airstrips at Lalmonirhat and Shalutikar. Both of these were used for flying in supplies and arms from India. Pakistan sent another five battalions from West Pakistan as reinforcements.

== Indian involvement ==
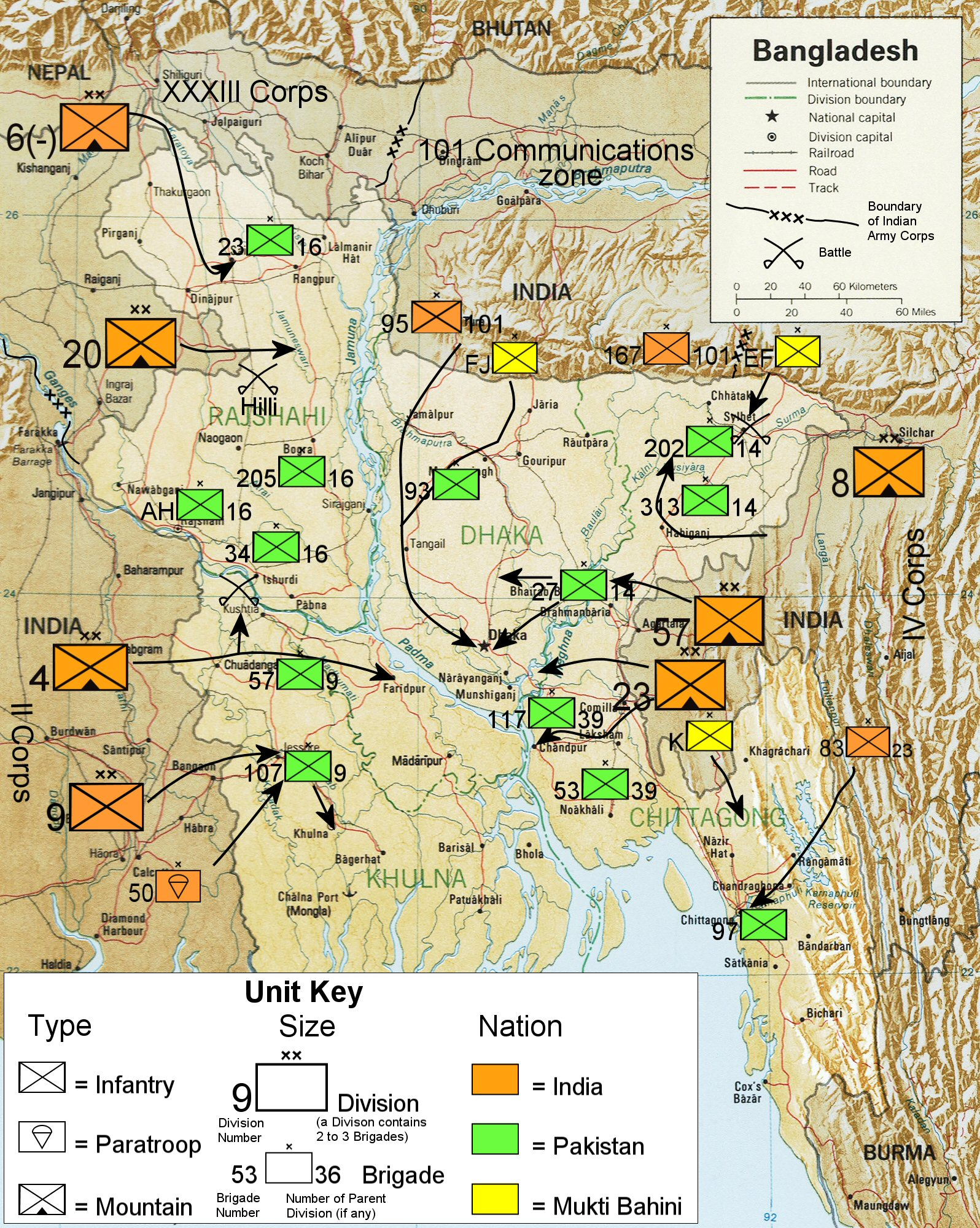
Illustration showing military units and troop movements during the war

All unprejudiced persons objectively surveying the grim events in Bangladesh since March 25 have recognised the revolt of 75 million people, a people who were forced to the conclusion that neither their life, nor their liberty, to say nothing of the possibility of the pursuit of happiness, was available to them.

— Indira Gandhi, Letter to Richard Nixon, 15 December 1971

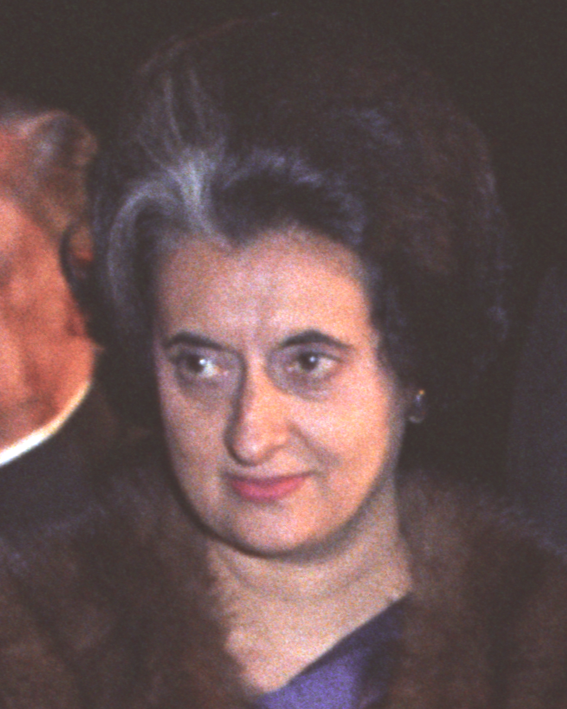
Indira Gandhi

Indian prime minister Indira Gandhi concluded that instead of taking in millions of refugees, India would be economically better off going to war against Pakistan. As early as 28 April 1971, the Indian Cabinet had asked General Manekshaw (Chairman of the Chiefs of Staff Committee) to "Go into East Pakistan". Hostile relations in the past between India and Pakistan added to India's decision to intervene in Pakistan's civil war. Major General J. F. R. Jacob, Chief of Staff of India's Eastern Command, devised and executed the brilliant capture of Dhaka, bypassing other towns on the way there which brought about the surrender of the Pakistani commander of its Eastern Forces, A.A.K. Niazi in that city.

As a result, the Indian government decided to support the creation of a separate state for ethnic Bengalis by supporting the Mukti Bahini. RAW helped to organize, train and arm these insurgents. Consequently, the Mukti Bahini succeeded in harassing Pakistani military in East Pakistan, creating conditions conducive to a full-scale Indian military intervention in early December.

The Pakistan Air Force (PAF) launched a preemptive strike on Indian Air Force bases on 3 December 1971. The attack was modeled on the Israeli Air Force's Operation Focus during the Six-Day War and intended to neutralize the Indian Air Force planes on the ground. India saw the strike as an open act of unprovoked aggression, which marked the official start of the Indo-Pakistani War. In response to the attack, both India and Pakistan formally acknowledged the "existence of a state of war between the two countries" even though neither government had formally issued a declaration of war.

Allied Indian T-55 tanks on their way to Dacca

Three Indian corps were involved in the liberation of East Pakistan. They were supported by nearly three brigades of Mukti Bahini fighting alongside them, and many more who were fighting irregularly. That was far superior to the Pakistani army of three divisions. The Indians quickly overran the country, selectively engaging or bypassing heavily defended strongholds. Pakistani forces were unable to effectively counter the Indian attack, as they had been deployed in small units around the border to counter the guerrilla attacks by the Mukti Bahini. Unable to defend Dacca, the Pakistanis surrendered on 16 December 1971.

=== Air and naval war ===
The Indian Air Force carried out several sorties against Pakistan, and within a week, IAF aircraft dominated the skies of East Pakistan. It achieved near-total air supremacy by the end of the first week, as the entire Pakistani air contingent in the east, PAF No.14 Squadron, was grounded because of Indian and Bangladeshi airstrikes at Tejgaon, Kurmitola, Lalmonirhat and Shamsher Nagar. Sea Hawks from the carrier INS Vikrant also struck Chittagong, Barisal and Cox's Bazar, destroying the eastern wing of the Pakistan Navy and effectively blockading the East Pakistan ports, cutting off any escape routes for the stranded Pakistani soldiers. The nascent Bangladesh Navy (comprising officers and sailors who defected from the Pakistani Navy) aided the Indians in the marine warfare, carrying out attacks, most notably Operation Jackpot.

== Surrender and aftermath ==
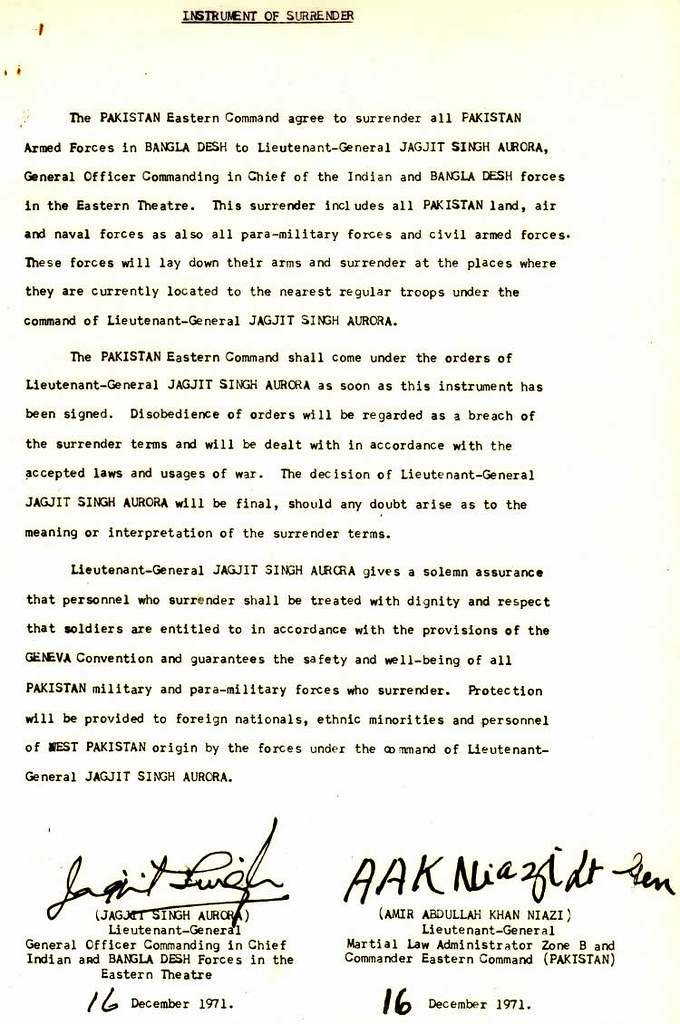
Pakistani Instrument of Surrender

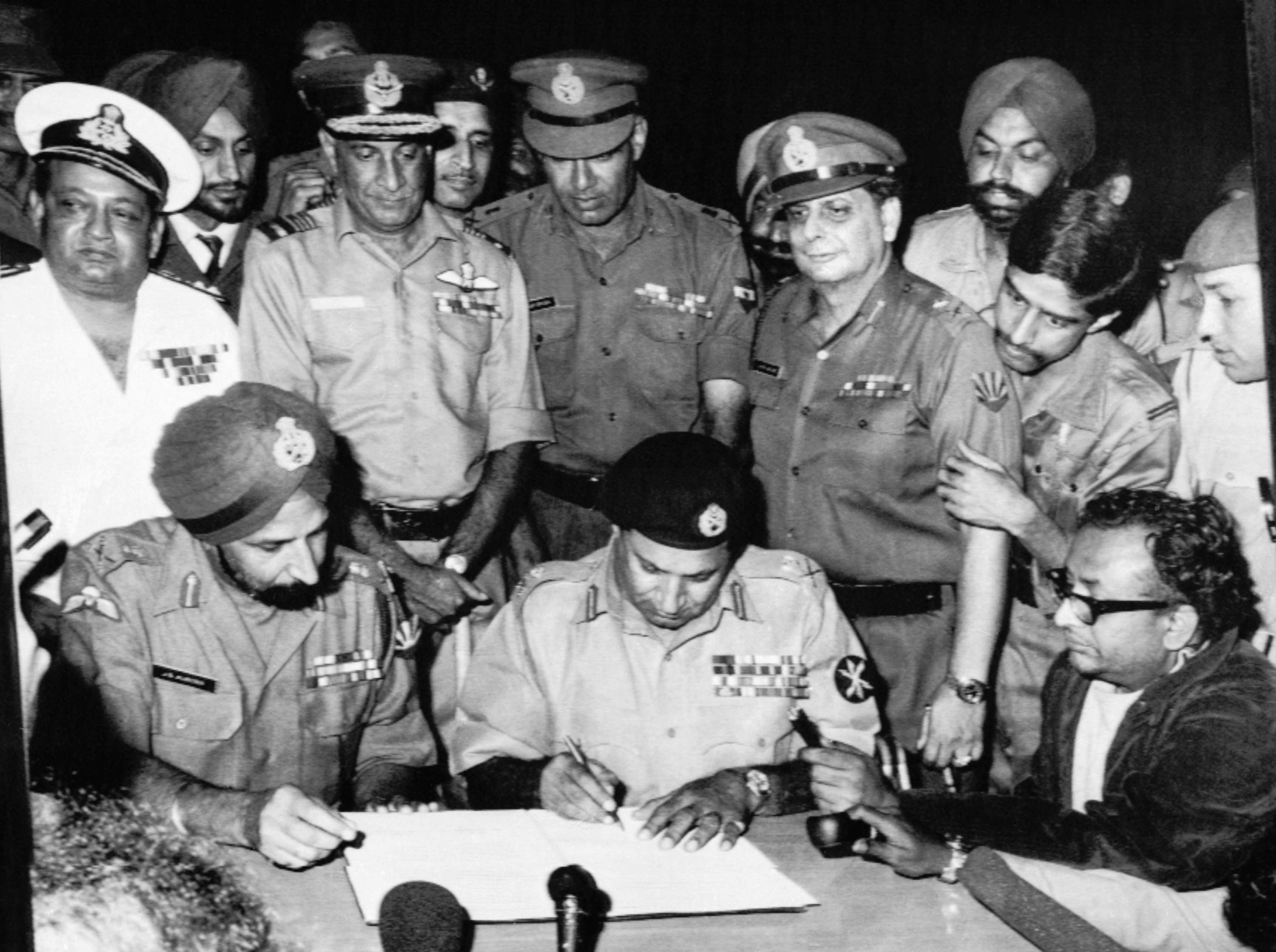
Signing of Pakistani Instrument of Surrender by Pakistan's Lt.Gen. A. A. K. Niazi and Jagjit Singh Aurora on behalf of Indian and Bangladesh Forces in Dhaka on 16 Dec. 1971

On 16 December 1971, Lt. Gen Amir Abdullah Khan Niazi, Chief Martial Law Administrator of East Pakistan and commander of Pakistan Army forces in East Pakistan signed the Instrument of Surrender. At the time of surrender only a few countries had provided diplomatic recognition to the new nation. Over 93,000 Pakistani troops surrendered to the Indian forces and Bangladesh Liberation forces, making it the largest surrender since World War II.

Bangladesh sought admission to the UN with most voting in its favor. China vetoed this as Pakistan was its key ally. The United States, also a key ally of Pakistan, was one of the last nations to accord Bangladesh recognition. To ensure a smooth transition, in 1972 the Simla Agreement was signed between India and Pakistan. The treaty ensured that Pakistan recognized the independence of Bangladesh in exchange for the return of the Pakistani PoWs.

India treated all the PoWs in strict accordance with the Geneva Convention, rule 1925. It released more than 93,000 Pakistani PoWs in five months. Further, as a gesture of goodwill, nearly 200 soldiers who were sought for war crimes by Bengalis were pardoned by India. The accord also gave back 13,000 km^{2} (5,019 sq mi) of land that Indian troops had seized in West Pakistan during the war, though India retained a few strategic areas, most notably Kargil (which was in turn the focal point of a war between the two nations in 1999). This was done as a measure of promoting "lasting peace" and acknowledged by many observers as a sign of maturity by India. But some in India felt the treaty had been too lenient to Bhutto, who had pleaded for leniency, arguing that the fragile democracy in Pakistan would crumble if Pakistanis perceived the accord as overly harsh.

=== Reaction in West Pakistan to the war ===
Reaction to the defeat and dismemberment of half the nation was a shocking loss to top military and civilians alike. Few had expected that they would lose the formal war in under a fortnight, and there was also unsettlement over what was perceived as a meek surrender of the army in East Pakistan. Yahya Khan's dictatorship collapsed and gave way to Bhutto, who took the opportunity to rise to power.

General Niazi, who surrendered along with 93,000 troops, was viewed with suspicion and contempt upon his return to Pakistan. He was shunned and branded a traitor. The war also exposed the shortcomings of Pakistan's declared strategic doctrine that the "defence of East Pakistan lay in West Pakistan".

== Atrocities ==
Rayerbazar killing field photographed immediately after the war, showing dead bodies of intellectuals (image courtesy: Rashid Talukder, 1971)

During the war, there were widespread killings and other atrocities—including the displacement of civilians in Bangladesh (East Pakistan at the time) and widespread violations of human rights beginning with Operation Searchlight on 25 March 1971. Members of the Pakistani military and supporting paramilitary forces killed an estimated 300,000 to 3,000,000 people and raped between 200,000 and 400,000 Bangladeshi women in a systematic campaign of genocidal rape. Pakistan's religious leaders openly supported the crime by labeling Bengali freedom fighters "Hindus" and Bengali women "the booty of war". In fact, more than 80 percent of the Bengali people were Muslims at that time.

A large section of the intellectual community of Bangladesh were murdered, mostly by the Al-Shams and Al-Badr forces, at the instruction of the Pakistani Army. Just two days before the surrender, on 14 December 1971, Pakistan Army and the Razakar militia (local collaborators) picked up at least 100 physicians, professors, writers and engineers in Dacca, and murdered them, leaving the dead bodies in a mass grave.

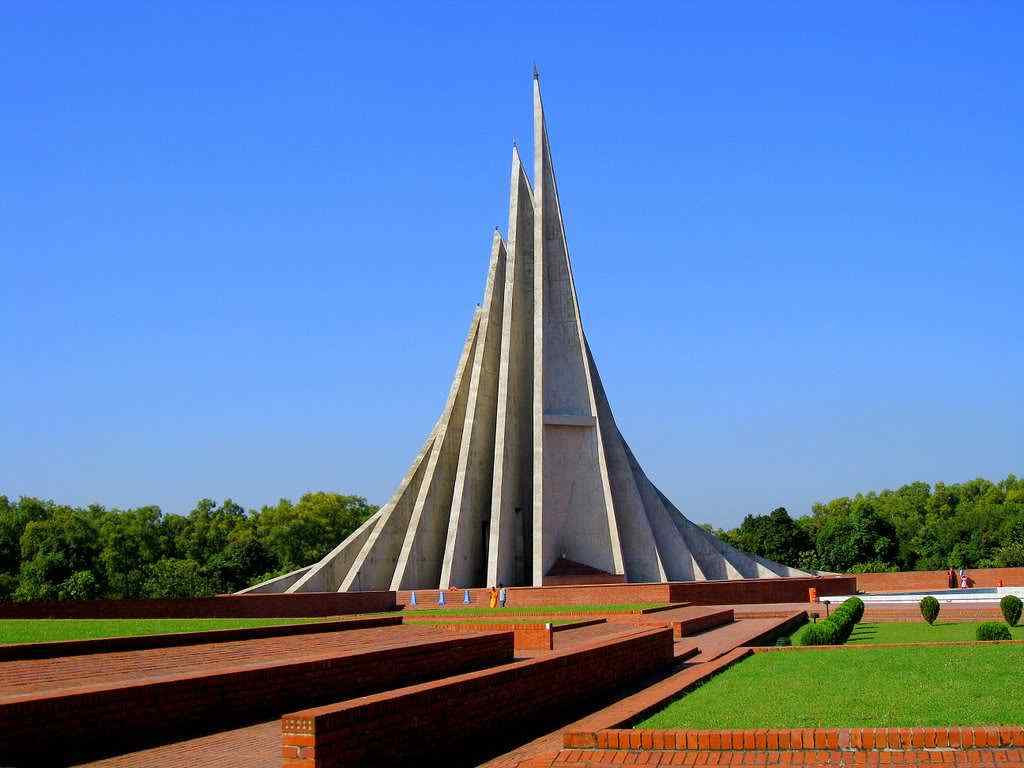
Memorial for freedom fighters

Many mass graves have been discovered in Bangladesh. The first night of war on Bengalis, which is documented in telegrams from the American consulate in Dacca to the U.S. State Department, saw indiscriminate killings of students of Dacca University and other civilians. Numerous women were tortured, raped, and killed during the war; the exact numbers are not known and are debated. The widespread rape of Bangladeshi women led to birth of thousands of war babies.

The Pakistan Army also kept numerous Bengali women as sex slaves inside the Dacca Cantonment. Most were captured from Dacca University and private homes. There was significant sectarian violence not only perpetrated and encouraged by the Pakistani army, but also by Bengali nationalists against non-Bengali minorities, especially Biharis. In June 1971, Bihari representatives said that 500,000 Biharis were killed by Bengalis. R. J. Rummel gives a prudent estimate of 150,000 killed.

On 16 December 2002, the George Washington University's National Security Archive published a collection of declassified documents, consisting mostly of communications between U.S. embassy officials and United States Information Service centers in Dacca and India, and officials in Washington, D.C. These documents show that U.S. officials working in diplomatic institutions within Bangladesh used the terms "selective genocide" and "genocide" (see The Blood Telegram) for information on events they had knowledge of at the time. Genocide is the term still used to describe the event in almost every major publication and newspaper in Bangladesh, although in Pakistan, the accusations against Pakistani forces continue to be disputed.

== International reactions ==
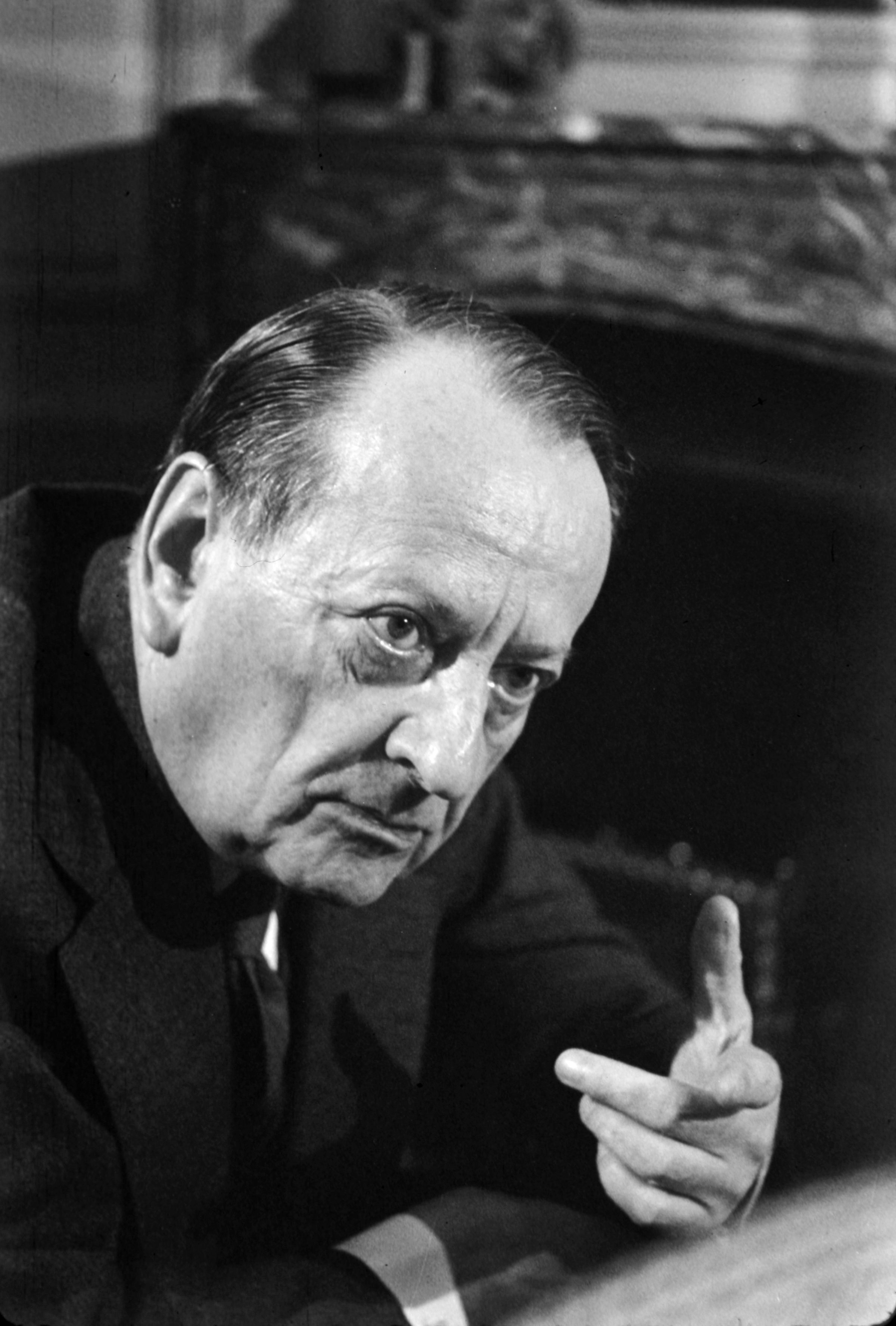
Former French minister André Malraux vowed to fight alongside the Mukti Bahini in the Liberation War.

Following Sheikh Mujibur Rahman's declaration of independence in March 1971, a worldwide campaign was undertaken by the Provisional Government of Bangladesh to drum up political support for the independence of East Pakistan as well as humanitarian support for the Bengali people.

Indian prime minister Indira Gandhi provided extensive diplomatic and political support to the Bangladesh movement. She toured many countries in a bid to create awareness of the Pakistani atrocities against Bengalis. This effort was to prove vital later during the war, in framing the world's context of the war and to justify military action by India. Also, following Pakistan's defeat, it ensured prompt recognition of the newly independent state of Bangladesh.

=== United Nations ===
Though the United Nations condemned the human rights violations during and following Operation Searchlight, it failed to defuse the situation politically before the start of the war.

After India entered the war, Pakistan, fearing certain defeat, made urgent appeals to the United Nations to intervene and force India to agree to a ceasefire. The UN Security Council assembled on 4 December 1971 to discuss the hostilities in South Asia. After lengthy discussions on 7 December, the United States made a resolution for "immediate cease-fire and withdrawal of troops". While supported by the majority, the USSR vetoed the resolution twice. In light of the Pakistani atrocities against Bengalis, the United Kingdom and France abstained on the resolution.

On 12 December, with Pakistan facing imminent defeat, the United States requested that the Security Council be reconvened. Pakistan's deputy prime minister and foreign minister, Zulfikar Ali Bhutto, was rushed to New York City to make the case for a resolution on the ceasefire. The council continued deliberations for four days. By the time proposals were finalized, Pakistan's forces in the East had surrendered and the war had ended, making the measures merely academic. Bhutto, frustrated by the failure of the resolution and the inaction of the United Nations, ripped up his speech and left the council.

Most UN member nations were quick to recognize Bangladesh within months of its independence.

=== Bhutan ===
As the Bangladesh Liberation War approached the defeat of the Pakistan Army, the Himalayan kingdom of Bhutan became the first state in the world to recognize the newly independent country on 6 December 1971. Sheikh Mujibur Rahman, the first president of Bangladesh, visited Bhutan to attend the coronation of Jigme Singye Wangchuck, the fourth King of Bhutan in June 1974.

=== US and USSR ===
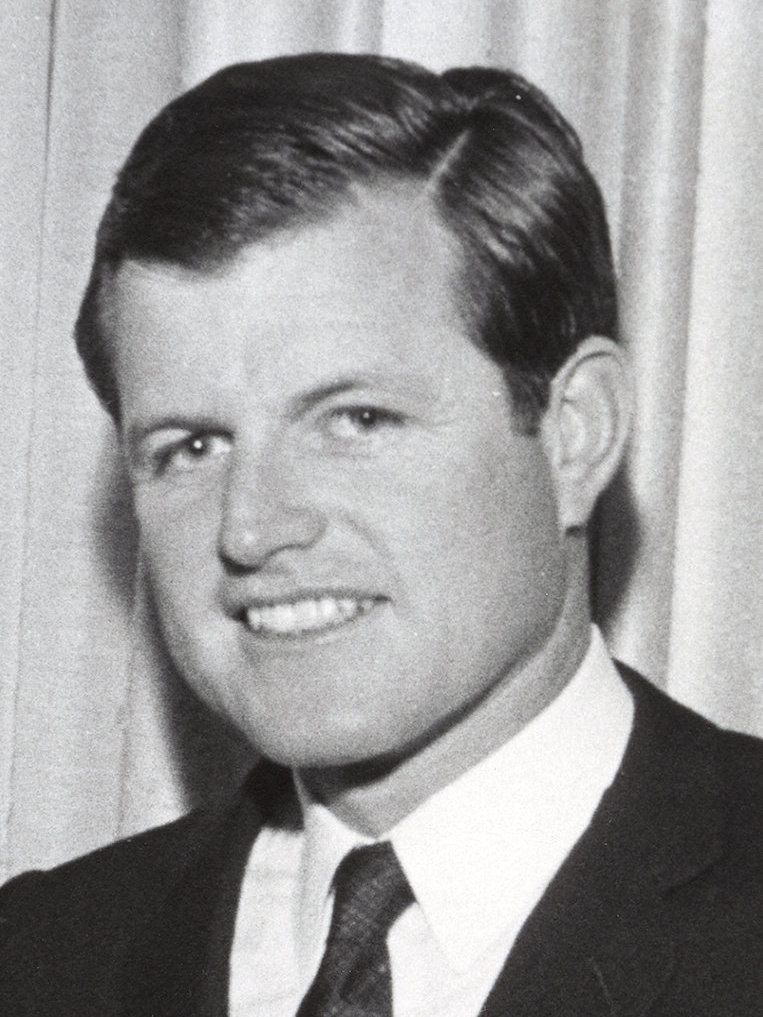
Senator Ted Kennedy led US congressional support for Bangladeshi independence.

The US government stood by its old ally Pakistan in terms of diplomacy and military threats. US president Richard Nixon and his National Security Advisor Henry Kissinger feared Soviet expansion into South and Southeast Asia. Pakistan was a close ally of the People's Republic of China, with which Nixon had been negotiating a rapprochement and which he intended to visit in February 1972. Nixon feared that an Indian invasion of West Pakistan would mean total Soviet domination of the region, and that it would seriously undermine the global position of the United States and the regional position of United States new tacit ally, China.

To demonstrate to China the bona fides of the United States as an ally, and in direct violation of the US Congress-imposed sanctions on Pakistan, Nixon sent military supplies to Pakistan and routed them through Jordan and Iran, while also encouraging China to increase its arms supplies to Pakistan. The Nixon administration also ignored reports it received of the genocidal activities of the Pakistani Army in East Pakistan, most notably the Blood telegram.

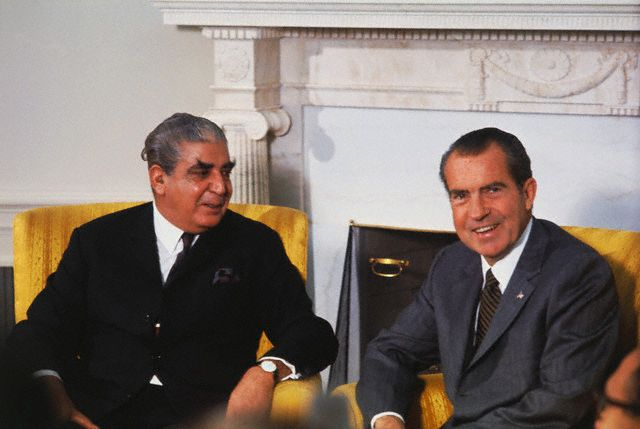
The Nixon administration was widely criticized for its close ties with the military junta led by General Yahya Khan. American diplomats in East Pakistan expressed profound dissent in the Blood Telegram.

Nixon denied getting involved in the situation, saying that it was an internal matter of Pakistan, but when Pakistan's defeat seemed certain, he sent the aircraft carrier USS Enterprise to the Bay of Bengal, a move the Indians deemed a nuclear threat. Enterprise arrived on station on 11 December 1971. On 6 and 13 December, the Soviet Navy dispatched two groups of ships, armed with nuclear missiles, from Vladivostok; they trailed US Task Force 74 in the Indian Ocean from 18 December until 7 January 1972.

The Soviet Union supported Bangladesh and Indian armies, as well as the Mukti Bahini during the war, recognising that the independence of Bangladesh would weaken the position of its rivals—the United States and the People's Republic of China. It gave assurances to India that if a confrontation with the U.S. or China developed, the USSR would take countermeasures. This was enshrined in the Indo-Soviet friendship treaty signed in August 1971. The Soviets also sent a nuclear submarine to ward off the threat posed by USS Enterprise in the Indian Ocean.

At the end of the war, the Warsaw Pact countries were among the first to recognize Bangladesh. The Soviet Union accorded recognition to Bangladesh on 25 January 1972. The United States delayed recognition for some months, before according it on 8 April 1972.

=== China ===
As a long-standing ally of Pakistan, the People's Republic of China reacted with alarm to the evolving situation in East Pakistan and the prospect of India invading West Pakistan and Pakistani-controlled Kashmir. On 10 December 1971, Nixon instructed Kissinger to ask the Chinese to move some forces toward the frontier with India. Nixon said, "Threaten to move forces or move them, Henry, that's what they must do now". Kissinger met with Huang Hua, China's permanent representative to the United Nations, later that evening.

The Chinese did not respond to this encouragement, because unlike the 1962 Sino-Indian War, when India was caught entirely unaware, this time the Indian Army was prepared and had deployed eight mountain divisions to the Sino-Indian border to guard against such an eventuality. China instead threw its weight behind demands for an immediate ceasefire.

When Bangladesh applied for membership to the United Nations in 1972, China vetoed its application because two U.N. resolutions about the repatriation of Pakistani prisoners of war and civilians had not yet been implemented. China was also among the last countries to recognize independent Bangladesh, refusing to do so until 31 August 1975.

=== Sri Lanka ===
Sri Lanka (then called Ceylon) saw the partition of Pakistan as an example for itself and feared India might use its enhanced power against it in the future. Despite the left-wing government of Sirimavo Bandaranaike following a neutral non-aligned foreign policy, Sri Lanka decided to help Pakistan in the war. As Pakistani aircraft could not fly over Indian territory, they would have to take a longer route around India and so they stopped at Bandaranaike Airport in Sri Lanka where they were refueled before flying to East Pakistan.

=== Arab world ===
As many Arab countries were allied with both the United States and Pakistan, it was easy for Kissinger to encourage them to participate. He sent letters to both, the king of Jordan and the king of Saudi Arabia. Nixon gave permission for Jordan to send ten F-104s and promised to provide replacements. According to author Martin Bowman, "Libyan F-5s were reportedly deployed to Sargodha AFB, perhaps as a potential training unit to prepare Pakistani pilots for an influx of more F-5s from Saudi Arabia."

Libyan dictator Gaddafi also personally directed a strongly worded letter to Indian prime minister Indira Gandhi accusing her of aggression against Pakistan, which endeared him to all Pakistanis.

== See also ==
- Awards and decorations of the Bangladesh Liberation War
- Liberation War Museum
- Movement demanding trial of war criminals (Bangladesh)
- NAP-Communist Party-Students Union Special Guerrilla Forces
- Kader Bahini
- Irregular military
