= East Pakistan Civil Armed Force =

Paramilitary force in East Pakistan

- পূর্ব পাকিস্তান বেসামরিক সশস্ত্র বাহিনী
- Leader: Maj Gen. Jamshed Khan
- Dates active: April 1971 — December 1971
- Allegiance: Pakistan
- Active regions: East Pakistan
- Size: 15,000 — 18,000 (April 1971); 25,000 (May 1971)

East Pakistan Civil Armed Force (Note: Bengali: পূর্ব পাকিস্তান বেসামরিক সশস্ত্র বাহিনী, romanized: Pūrba pākistāna bēsāmarika saśastra bāhinī) (EPCAF) was a paramilitary force that operated in East Pakistan. It replaced the East Pakistan Rifles and was being used to guard Dacca and Pakistani strongholds, It evolved from East Pakistan Rifles.

== History ==
While Pakistan Army with its collaborators, Razakars and Mujahid Bahini was focused on stopping Mukti Bahini-led resistance, EPCAF was given the duty to establish internal security and to guard strongholds of Pakistani forces. EPCAF was raised in April 1971, EPCAF effectively replaced East Pakistan Rifles due to decisions made by A. A. K. Niazi and Major Gen. Jamshed Khan became the Director General (DG) of EPCAF under his order. East Pakistan Civil Armed Force particularly evolved from the East Pakistan Rifles, East Pakistan Civil Armed Force was composed of Bihari Muslims, non-Bengalis of East Pakistan, retired personnel, pro-Pakistan Bengalis and West Pakistani personnel. Initially, EPCAF had about 15 thousand to 18 thousand troops, On May 1971, the amount of total personnel grew to 25,000, EPCAF was divided into at least 17 wings.

On 1 September 1971, East Pakistan Civil Armed Force launched raids on Basti Nasirabad, three miles east of Dacca, and killed 9 Indian agents linked to the Indian Armed Forces and captured one after a clash between EPCAF and Indian forces, at least 9 rifles, 3 stenguns, 5 shotguns, 39 grenades, several hundred cartridges and 43 mines and high amounts of bombs and explosives were captured.

On 2 September 1971, Mukti Bahini freedom fighters attacked Gazaria Thana targeting nearby EPCAF and Razakar positions which resulted in the death of 3 EPCAF troops, 2 Razakars and capture of 11 Razakars and also capture of 15 rifles and 350 rounds of ammunition.

On 12 September 1971, East Pakistan Civil Armed Force and East Pakistan Police launched a raid in Purana Paltan, Dacca and captured 4 rifles, 3 stenguns, 12 grenades and ammunition and clashed with Indian troops in Narayanganj, Dacca, resulting in 1 EPCAF troop being injured and 13 Indian troops being killed in a joint operation.

In December 1971, India's Border Security Force (BSF) attacked and pounded EPCAF positions in Rajshahi and Chapainawabganj.

On 9 December 1971, Indian forces launched an attack on Ashuganj and attacked EPCAF troops.

On 13 December 1971, Indian troops clashed with Pakistani forces and EPCAF in Sylhet, at least 19 EPCAF troops were killed and 10 were captured in the Battle of Sylhet.

== Deployments ==
- Dacca Sector (Dacca)
  - 13 Wing
  - 16 Wing
- Jessore Sector (Jessore)
  - 15 Wing (Jessore-Chaugachha)
- 4 Wing (Chuadanga)
- 5 Wing (Khulna-Bagerhat-Barisal)
- 17 Wing
- Rajshahi Sector (Rajshahi)
  - 6 Wing (Rajshahi-Chapainawabganj-Rohanpur)
  - 7 Wing (Naogaon-Panitala)
  - 9 Wing (Bogra-Sirajganj)
- Rangpur Sector (Rangpur)
  - 8 Wing (Dinajpur)
  - 9 Wing (Thakurgaon-Panchagarh)
  - 10 Wing (Rangpur-Lalmonirhat)
- Comilla Sector (Comilla)
  - 1 Wing (Comilla)
  - 3 Wing (Brahmanbaria)
  - 12 Wing (Comilla)
- Chittagong Sector
  - 2 Wing (Feni)
  - 11 Wing (Chittagong)
  - 14 Wing (Chittagong-Cox's Bazar)

== Aftermath ==
After Pakistani forces were defeated by the Mukti Bahini and Indian Army and surrendered on 16 December 1971 and the Bangladesh War of Independence came to an end, Families of members and leaders of East Pakistan Civil Armed Force were promised rewards and benefits by Pakistani authorities.

Despite being a paramilitary force which operated in East Pakistan under the jurisdiction of the Pakistan Army, unlike the Razakars and Mujahid Bahini, EPCAF was not involved in war crimes or the Bangladesh genocide and was more focused on repelling Mukti Bahini offensives and guarding Pakistani strongholds and EPCAF was dismantled after December 1971.
