= Mujahid Bahini (East Pakistan) =

Paramilitary force in East Pakistan

- Dates active: 1971
- Status: Disbanded

Mujahid Bahini (Note: Bengali: মুজাহিদ বাহিনী, Urdu: مجاہد باہنی) was an East Pakistani paramilitary force during the Bangladesh Liberation War, that fought against the Mukti Bahini and aided the Pakistan Army.

== Formation ==
On July 29, 1971, Tikka Khan called for formation of the Mujahid Bahini to fight against the Mukti Bahini. In June 1971, East Pakistani Islamic scholars demanded for the establishment of Mujahid Bahini. In August–September, the Mujahid Bahini in East Pakistan was established and the group's recruits were reportedly dacoits. Postmaster Mr Hoque said:

They had no manners and no education, and the army gave them only the leftover weapons and almost no ammunition.

== Actions ==
On 30 October 1971, Mujahid Bahini caught some Indian agents, Indian robbers and Mujahid Bahini then opened fire, killing 3 and other robbers surrendered. Mujahid Bahini also captured 21 rifles, 252 bombs, 320 land mines and 850 rounds of ammunition in different locations across East Pakistan.

On 8 or 9 December 1971, Pakistani forces reportedly decided to leave Madaripur to enter Faridpur, Pakistan Army and its local collaborators and supporters, Razakar, Al Badr, Al Shams and Mujahid Bahini crossed the Ghatakchar Bridge where Mukti Bahini guerillas ambushed them. Madaripur was liberated in the following days and Mukti Bahini captured Madaripur and Ghatail.

== Leaders ==
The leaders of Mujahid Bahini were Zahid Hossain Khokon's brother, Zafor, Mawlana Abul Kalam and Mawlana Mohammad Ali, Zafor was eventually shot dead by Bengali fighters on May 29, 1971 during a battle with Bengali fighters and Pakistan Army at Chandhat.

== Human rights violations ==
Mujahid Bahini reportedly committed killings, rape, torture, abduction, deportation, confinement against Bengali civilians.

== See also ==
- Razakars (Pakistan)
- Al-Badr (East Pakistan)
- Al-Shams (East Pakistan)
- East Pakistan Civil Armed Force
- East Pakistan Central Peace Committee
- Collaborators Act 1972
